= Eisner Award for Best Publication for Kids =

American comic book award

- Awarded for: Best Best Publication for Kids
- Country: United States
- First award: 2008
- Most recent winner: "The Cartoonists Club" by Raina Telgemeier and Scott McCloud
- Website: www.comic-con.org/awards/eisner-awards-current-info

The Eisner Award for Best Publication for Kids is an award for "creative achievement" in American comic books.

== History and name change ==
The award was launched in 2008 as Best Publication for Kids. In 2012 the name was changed to Best Publication for Kids (ages 8–12). In 2016 the name was changed to Best Publication for Kids (ages 9–12). In 2020 the name was changed back to Best Publication for Kids.

== Winners and nominees ==
Year	Title	Authors	Ref.
2000s
2008	Mouse Guard: Fall 1152 and Mouse Guard: Winter 1152 (Archaia Entertainment)	David Petersen	
2008	Amelia Rules! and Amelia Rules! Funny Stories (Renaissance Press)	Jimmy Gownley	
2008	Star Wars: Clone Wars Adventures (Dark Horse Comics)	edited by Jeremy Barlow	
2008	The Wall: Growing Up Behind the Iron Curtain (Frances Foster Books/Farrar, Straus and Giroux)	Peter Sís	
2008	Yotsuba&! (ADV Manga)	Kiyohiko Azuma	
2009	Tiny Titans (DC Comics)	Art Baltazar and Franco Aureliani	
2009	Amulet Book 1: The Stonekeeper (Scholastic Graphix)	Kazu Kibuishi	
2009	Cowa! (Viz Media)	Akira Toriyama	
2009	Princess at Midnight (Image Comics)	Andi Watson	
2009	Stinky (RAW Junior)	Eleanor Davis	
2010s
2010	The Wonderful Wizard of Oz (Marvel Comics)	L. Frank Baum, adapted by Eric Shanower, and Skottie Young	
2010	Lunch Lady and the Cyborg Substitute (Alfred A. Knopf)	Jarrett J. Krosoczka	
2010	The Secret Science Alliance and the Copycat Crook (Bloomsbury Publishing)	Eleanor Davis	
2010	Tiny Tyrant, vol. 1: The Ethelbertosaurus (First Second Books)	Lewis Trondheim and Fabrice Parme	
2010	The TOON Treasury of Classic Children’s Comics (Abrams ComicArts/Toon Books)	edited by Art Spiegelman and Françoise Mouly	
2011	Tiny Titans (DC Comics)	Art Baltazar and Franco Aureliani	
2011	Amelia Earhart: This Broad Ocean (Center for Cartoon Studies/Disney Press/Hyperion Books for Children)	Sara Stewart Taylor and Ben Towle	
2011	Amelia Rules!: True Things (Adults Don’t Want Kids to Know) (Atheneum Books/Simon & Schuster)	Jimmy Gownley	
2011	Binky to the Rescue (Kids Can Press)	Ashley Spires	
2011	Scratch9 (Ape Entertainment)	Rob M. Worley and Jason T. Kruse	
2011	The Unsinkable Walker Bean (First Second Books)	Aaron Renier	
2012	Snarked! (KaBOOM!)	Roger Langridge	
2012	The All-New Batman: The Brave and the Bold (DC Comics)	Sholly Fisch, Rick Burchett, and Dan Davis	
2012	Amelia Rules: The Meaning of Life ... And Other Stuff (Atheneum Books)	Jimmy Gownley	
2012	The Ferret's a Foot (Graphic Universe/Lerner Books)	Colleen AF Venable and Stephanie Yue	
2012	Princeless (Action Lab Comics)	Jeremy Whitley and Mia Goodwin	
2012	Zita the Spacegirl (First Second Books)	Ben Hatke	
2013	Adventure Time (KaBOOM!)	Ryan North, Shelli Paroline, and Braden Lamb	
2013	Amulet Book 5: Prince of the Elves (Scholastic Graphix)	Kazu Kibuishi	
2013	Cow Boy: A Boy and His Horse (Archaia Entertainment)	Nate Cosby and Chris Eliopoulos	
2013	Crogan's Loyalty (Oni Press)	Chris Schweizer	
2013	Hilda and the Midnight Giant (Nobrow Press)	Luke Pearson	
2013	The Road to Oz (Marvel Comics)	L. Frank Baum, adapted by Eric Shanower and Skottie Young	
2014	The Adventures of Superhero Girl (Dark Horse Comics)	Faith Erin Hicks	
2014	Hilda and the Bird Parade (Nobrow Press)	Luke Pearson	
2014	Jane, the Fox and Me (Groundwood Books)	Fanny Britt and Isabelle Arsenault, translated by Susan Ouriou and Christelle Morelli	
2014	The Lost Boy (Scholastic Graphix)	Greg Ruth	
2014	Mouse Guard: Legends of the Guard vol. 2 edited (Archaia Entertainment/Boom! Studios)	David Petersen, Paul Morrissey, and Rebecca Taylor	
2014	Star Wars: Jedi Academy (Scholastic Kids)	Jeffrey Brown	
2015	El Deafo (Amulet Books/Abrams Books)	Cece Bell	
2015	Batman Li'l Gotham, vol. 2 (DC Comics)	Derek Fridolfs and Dustin Nguyen	
2015	I Was the Cat (Oni Press)	Paul Tobin and Benjamin Dewey	
2015	Little Nemo: Return to Slumberland (IDW Publishing)	Eric Shanower and Gabriel Rodriguez	
2015	Tiny Titans: Return to the Treehouse (DC Comics)	Art Baltazar and Franco Aureliani	
2016	Over the Garden Wall (Boom! Studios/KaBOOM!)	Pat McHale, Amalia Levari, and Jim Campbell	
2016	Baba Yaga's Assistant (Candlewick Press)	Marika McCoola and Emily Carroll	
2016	Child Soldier: When Boys and Girls Are Used in War (Kids Can Press)	Jessica Dee Humphreys, Michel Chikwanine, and Claudia Dávila	
2016	Nathan Hale’s Hazardous Tales: The Underground Abductor (Abrams Books/Amulet Books)	Nathan Hale	
2016	Roller Girl (Dial Press)	Victoria Jamieson	
2016	Sunny Side Up (Scholastic Graphix)	Jennifer L. Holm and Matthew Holm	
2017	Ghosts (Scholastic Graphix)	Raina Telgemeier	
2017	The Drawing Lesson (Ten Speed Press)	Mark Crilley	
2017	Hilda and the Stone Forest (Flying Eye Books)	Luke Pearson	
2017	Rikki (Karate Petshop)	Rudyard Kipling, adapted by Norm Harper and Matthew Foltz-Gray	
2017	Science Comics: Dinosaurs (First Second Books)	MK Reed and Joe Flood	
2018	The Tea Dragon Society (Oni Press)	Kay O'Neill	
2018	Bolivar (Archaia Entertainment)	Sean Rubin	
2018	Home Time, Book One: Under the River (Top Shelf Productions)	Campbell Whyte	
2018	Nightlights (Nobrow Press)	Lorena Alvarez	
2018	Wallace the Brave (Andrews McMeel Publishing)	Will Henry	
2019	The Nameless City: The Divided Earth (First Second Books)	Faith Erin Hicks	
2019	Aquicorn Cove (Oni Press)	Kay O'Neill	
2019	Be Prepared (First Second Books)	Vera Brosgol	
2019	The Cardboard Kingdom (Alfred A. Knopf/Random House Children’s Books)	Chad Sell	
2019	Crush (JY/Yen Press)	Svetlana Chmakova	
2020s
2020	Guts (Scholastic Graphix)	Raina Telgemeier	
2020	Akissi: More Tales of Mischief (Flying Eye Books/Nobrow Press)	Marguerite Abouet and Mathieu Sapin	
2020	Dog Man: For Whom the Ball Rolls (Scholastic Graphix)	Dav Pilkey	
2020	New Kid (Quill Tree Books/HarperCollins)	Jerry Craft	
2020	This Was Our Pact (First Second Books/Macmillan Publishers)	Ryan Andrews	
2020	The Wolf in Underpants (Graphic Universe/Lerner Publishing Group)	Wilfrid Lupano, Mayana Itoïz, and Paul Cauuet	
2021	Superman Smashes the Klan (DC Comics)	Gene Luen Yang and Gurihiru	
2021	Doodleville (Knopf Books for Young Readers/Random House Children's Books)	Chad Sell	
2021	Go with the Flow (First Second Books/Macmillan Publishers)	Lily Williams and Karen Schneemann	
2021	Mister Invincible: Local Hero (Magnetic Press)	Pascal Jousselin	
2021	Snapdragon (First Second Books/Macmillan Publishers)	Kat Leyh	
2021	Twins (Scholastic Graphix)	Varian Johnson and Shannon Wright	
2022	Salt Magic (Margaret Ferguson Books/Holiday House)	Hope Larson and Rebecca Monk	
2022	Allergic (Scholastic)	Megan Wagner Lloyd and Michelle Mee Nutter	
2022	Four Fisted Tales: Animals in Combat (Dead Reckoning)	Ben Towle	
2022	Rainbow Bridge (Aftershock Comics)	Steve Orlando, Steve Foxe, and Valentina Brancati	
2022	Saving Sorya: Chang and the Sun Bear (Dial Books for Young Readers)	Trang Nguyen and Jeet Zdung	
2022	The Science of Surfing: A Surfside Girls Guide to the Ocean (Top Shelf)	Kim Dwinell	
2023	Frizzy (First Second Books/Macmillan Publishers)	Claribel A. Ortega and Rose Bousamra	
2023	Adventuregame Comics: Leviathan (Amulet/Abrams)	Jason Shiga	
2023	Isla to Island (Atheneum/Simon & Schuster)	Alexis Castellanos	
2023	Little Monarchs (Margaret Ferguson Books/Holiday House)	Jonathan Case	
2023	Swim Team (HarperAlley)	Johnnie Christmas	
2024	Mexikid: A Graphic Memoir (Dial Books for Young Readers)	Pedro Martín	
2024	Buzzing (Little, Brown Ink)	Samuel Sattin and Rye Hickman	
2024	Missing You (Oni Press)	Phellip Willian, Melissa Garabeli, and Fabio Ramos	
2024	Mabuhay! (Scholastic Graphix)	Zachary Sterling	
2024	Saving Sunshine (First Second Books/Macmillan Publishers)	Saadia Faruqi and Shazleen Khan	
2025	Plain Jane and the Mermaid (First Second Books/Macmillan Publishers)	Vera Brosgol	
2025	How It All Ends (Greenwillow/HarperCollins Early Readers)	Emma Hunsinger	
2025	Next Stop (Random House Graphic)	Debbie Fong	
2025	Weirdo (First Second Books/Macmillan Publishers)	Tony Weaver Jr. and Jes & Cin Wibowo	
2025	Young Hag and the Witches' Quest	Isabel Greenberg	
2026	The Cartoonists Club (Scholastic Graphix)	Raina Telgemeier, Scott McCloud	
2026	Chickenpox (Henry Hold Books for Young Readers)	Remy Lai	
2026	Creature Clinic (First Second)	Gavin Aung Than	
2026	Night Chef: An Epic Tale of Friendship with a Side of Deliciousness! (Random House Graphics)	Mika Song	
2026	Oasis (Godwin Books/Henry Hold Books for Young Readers)	Guojing	
2026	A Song for You and I (Random House Graphic)	K. O'Neill	
