= Harvey Award for Best Children's Book =

American comic book award

Best Children's Book
- Country: United States
- First award: 2024

The Harvey Award for Best Children's Book is an annual American award for comics and graphic novels. Per the Harvey Awards website, the award honors the "best long-form original graphic novel or collection presented for younger audiences."

The award was originally established in 2018 as the Harvey Award for Best Children's or Young Adult Book, but in 2024, the award was split into the awards for Best Children's Book and Best Young Adult Book.

In 2018, the Harvey Awards were revamped into six categories, recognizing works as opposed to individual creators as in previous years.

== Winners and nominees ==
Best Children's Book nominees, 2024–present
Year	Title	Author	Publisher	Ref.
2024	Mexikid	Pedro Martín	Penguin Random House	
2024	Lightfall: The Dark Times	Tim Probert	HarperAlley	
2024	Lunar Boy	Jes Wibowo and Cin Wibowo	HarperAlley	
2024	Dungeons & Dragons Club: Time to Party	Lee Knox Ostertag and Xanthe Bouma	HarperAlley	
2024	Ant Story	Jay Hosler	HarperAlley	
2024	Dog Man: The Scarlet Shredder	Dav Pilkey	Scholastic	
2024	Saving Sunshine	Saadia Faruqi and Shazleen Khan	First Second	
2024	Timid	Jonathon Todd	Scholastic	
2024	Amulet Vol. 9	Kazu Kibuishi	Graphix	
2025	The Cartoonists Club	Raina Telgemeier and Scott McCloud	Graphix	
2025	Chickenpox	Remy Lai	Allen & Unwin	
2025	Free Piano (Not Haunted)	Whitney Gardner	Simon & Schuster Books for Young Readers	
2025	Mixed-Up	Kami Garcia and Brittney Williams	First Second	
2025	Song for You and I	Kay O'Neill	RH Graphic	
2025	Weirdo	Tony Weaver Jr., Jess Wibowo, and Cin Wibowo	First Second	
2026	Inbetweens	Faith Erin Hicks	First Second	
2026	A Fishboy Named . . . Sashimi	Dan Santat	Roaring Brook Press	
2026	The New Girl: First Crush	Cassandra Calin	Scholastic	
2026	Night Chef	Mika Song	Random House Graphic	
2026	Young Shadow & the Watchdogs	Ben Sears	Fantagraphics	
