= Dwayne McDuffie Award for Kids' Comics =

American comic book award

- Awarded for: Excellence in comic books for school-aged children
- Location: Ann Arbor Comic Arts Festival
- Country: United States
- First award: 2015

The Dwayne McDuffie Award for Kids' Comics is given to a comic book aimed at younger readers that fulfills the criteria of quality, timelessness, originality, diversity, and inclusion. It is named in honour of Dwayne McDuffie, a creator known for his work creating comics and animation.

The award was created after consultation with McDuffie's widow Charlotte Fullerton.

Kids Read Comics administers the award. It is presented each year at the Ann Arbor Comic Arts Festival at Ann Arbor District Library. Anyone can nominate a title for the award, but the shortlist and winner are chosen by a panel of judges including reviewers, librarians, teachers, and comic industry professionals.

== Criticism ==
In 2017 the award was criticized for creating a shortlist of comics created almost entirely by white people. Raina Telgemeier won the award that year and in her acceptance speech highlighted ten recent graphic novels by diverse creators and gave away ten copies of each to members of the audience.

In response to the criticism the award began to allow anyone to nominate titles.

== Award winners and nominees ==
=== 2015 ===
- Hilda and the Black Hound by Luke Pearson (Flying Eye Books)
- Bird and Squirrel on Ice by James Burks (Graphix)
- Cat Dad, King of the Goblins by Britt Wilson (Koyama Press)
- Cleopatra in Space by Mike Maihack (Graphix)
- Costume Quest: Invasion of the Candy Snatchers by Zac Gorman (Oni Press)
- El Deafo by Cece Bell (Harry N. Abrams)
- Hidden: A Child's Story of the Holocaust by Loïc Dauvillier, Marc Lizano, and Greg Salsedo (First Second)
- Lowriders in Space by Cathy Camper and Raúl the Third (Chronicle Books)
- Jim Henson's The Musical Monsters of Turkey Hollow (Note: Misnamed "The Magical Monsters of Turkey Hollow" in press release.) by Jim Henson and Jerry Juhl, adapted and illustrated by Roger Langridge (Archaia)
- Sisters by Raina Telgemeier (Graphix)

=== 2016 ===
- Awkward by Svetlana Chmakova (Yen Press)
- Chi's Sweet Home, Vol. 12 by Konami Kanata (Vertical)
- Courtney Crumrin, Vol. 7: Tales of a Warlock by Ted Naifeh (Oni Press)
- Flop to the Top! by Eleanor Davis and Drew Weing (Toon Books)
- The Flying Beaver Brothers and the Crazy Critter Race by Maxwell Eaton III (Random House)
- Human Body Theater by Maris Wicks (First Second)
- Lumberjanes, Vol. 1: Beware the Kitten Holy by ND Stevenson, Grace Ellis, Shannon Watters, and Gus Allen (BOOM! Box)
- Nathan Hale's Hazardous Tales: The Underground Abductor by Nathan Hale (Abrams)
- Ultraman by Tomohiro Shimoguchi and Eiichi Shimizu (Viz)
- The Unbeatable Squirrel Girl, Vol. 1: Squirrel Power by Ryan North and Erica Henderson (Marvel)

=== 2017 ===
- Ghosts by Raina Telgemeier (Graphix)
- Bad Machinery, Vol. 6: The Case of the Unwelcome Visitor by John Allison (Oni Press)
- Blip! by Barnaby Richards (TOON Books)
- The Cloud by K.I. Zachopoulos and Vincenzo Balzano (Archaia)
- The Creepy Case Files of Margo Maloo by Drew Weing (First Second)
- Goldie Vance by Hope Larson, Britney Williams, and Sarah Stern (BOOM! Box)
- Hilda and the Stone Forest by Luke Pearson (Flying Eye Books)
- Moon Girl and Devil Dinosaur, Vol. 1: BFF by Amy Reeder, Brandon Montclare, and Natacha Bustos (Marvel)
- Patsy Walker, A.K.A. Hellcat!, Vol. 1: Hooked On A Feline by Kate Leth, Brittney Williams, and Natasha Allegri (Marvel)
- Princess Princess Ever After by Katie O'Neill (Oni Press)

=== 2018 ===
- The Tea Dragon Society by Katie O'Neill (Oni Press)
- As the Crow Flies by Melanie Gillman (Iron Circus Comics)
- The Backstagers, Vol. 1: Rebels without Applause by James Tynion IV and Rian Sygh (BOOM! Box)
- Garbage Night by Jen Lee (Nobrow)
- I am Alfonso Jones by Tony Medina, Stacey Robinson, and John Jennings (Lee & Low Books)
- It's Treason, by George! by Steve Hockensmith, Chris Kientz, and Lee Nielsen (Smithsonian Books)
- Nightlights by Lorena Alvarez Gomez (Nobrow Press;)
- Space Battle Lunchtime, Vol. 2: A Recipe for Disaster by Natalie Riess (Oni Press)
- Where's Halmoni? by Julie Kim (Little Bigfoot)
- Witch Boy by Lee Knox Ostertag (Graphix)

=== 2019 ===
- The Cardboard Kingdom by Chad Sell (Knopf Books for Young Readers)
- Be Prepared by Vera Brosgol (First Second)
- Hidden Witch by Lee Knox Ostertag (Graphix)
- Last Pick by Jason Walz (First Second)
- Lumberjanes: The Infernal Compass by Lilah Sturges and polterink (BOOM! Box)
- My Beijing: Four Stories of Everyday Wonder by Nie Jun (Graphic Universe)
- Onibi: Diary of a Yokai Ghost Hunter by Atelier Sento (Tuttle Publishing)
- Peter & Ernesto: A Tale of Two Sloths by Graham Annable (First Second)
- The Prince and the Dressmaker by Jen Wang (First Second)
- Sanity & Tallulah by Molly Brooks (Disney-Hyperion)
