= Drama (graphic novel) =

Book by Raina Telgemeier

- Author: Raina Telgemeier
- Language: English
- Genre: Graphic novel
- Published: September 1, 2012
- Publisher: Scholastic/Graphix
- Pages: 240
- ISBN: 9780545326995
- Website: goraina.com/drama

Drama is a graphic novel written by American cartoonist Raina Telgemeier which centers on the story of Callie, a middle school student and theater-lover who works in her school's drama production crew. While navigating seventh grade, Callie deals with tween hardship, including confusing crushes, budding friendships, and middle school drama. It is a coming-of-age story that explores themes of friendship, teamwork, inclusion, and determination through Callie and her relationship with the people around her.

Although the novel has received much praise for the normalization of the LGBTQ community and consequently winning multiple awards, it has also been the source of much controversy. Drama has appeared in the American Library Association's list of top ten most challenged books for its inclusion of LGBTQ characters and ultimately became the seventh-most banned book between 2010 and 2019.

== Background ==
In an interview with School Library Journal, author Raina Telgemeier responds to a question about her inspiration for the graphic novel by saying she wrote from her life experiences, such as what she felt, saw and knew. Although Drama is a work of fiction, she draws from her personal experiences to create content. In high school, Telgemeier was in the choir and sang in the ensemble for many school plays, which ultimately drew her inspiration for writing Drama. Several characters in the graphic novel are based on real people in Telgemeier's own personal life. The twin brothers, Jesse and Justin, resemble two of Telgemeier's actual friends, and their in-book personalities mirror their real-life personalities. Although Telgemeier originally intended the characters to be high schoolers, Scholastic believed the setting was more appropriate for middle school.

The graphic novel itself combines both manga and comic forms, which the author frequently read while growing up. Telgemeier has since continued to write graphic novels with a similar growing up theme for her four other novels of Sisters, Smile, Guts, and Ghosts.

== Summary ==
Callie is a member of the stage crew at Eucalyptus Middle School. While walking home with her friends Greg and Matt, the former reveals he has broken up with his girlfriend Bonnie, prompting Callie to kiss him. The next day, the stage crew have a meeting where teacher Mr. Madera and student stage manager Loren announce the spring musical to be the Civil War-era romance Moon Over Mississippi. While Callie is ecstatic to lead set design for the production, Matt reveals to her later in the day that Bonnie has reached out, demonstrating little interest in a relationship with Callie.

As the stage crew prepares for auditions, Callie pitches ambitious plans for the set including a prop cannon that can fire and a magnolia to shake leaves from during the romantic climax; though skeptical of its feasibility, Mr. Madera and Loren approve her proposal. Callie later posts notices for auditions when she meets twin brothers Justin and Jesse Mendocino. The extroverted Justin looks forward to auditioning, but introverted Jesse is too nervous. Callie meets up with best friend Liz, who is in charge of costuming for the musical, to works on their respective ideas.

The next day, Callie goes to the mall with Justin and Jesse after school, where she shows the latter her favourite book: a detailed catalogue of broadway set designs from the 1910s and 1920s. As they wait for the twins' father to arrive, Justin begins singing the male lead's part he has prepared for the audition; Jesse surprises Callie by joining with the female lead's section. Though Jesse again refuses to audition, Callie convinces him to join the stage crew. The next day, a rude remark from Matt angers Callie; she decides not to eat lunch with the stage crew like she normally does as Matt is a member and instead eats with Justin. Justin reveals he is gay; though surprised, Callie is strongly supportive and hugs him as they are found by Matt and Liz.

Callie and Jesse watch the auditions for Moon Over Mississippi, being impressed by the auditions of Justin, Bonnie and a third student, West. When the cast is announced, West and Bonnie are given the lead roles of Bailey and Maybelle; Justin is cast as Colonel Scrimshaw, the comic relief. Jesse officially joins the stage crew as the production gets underway; this allows Callie to spend more time with Jesse. Callie uses the time to try to test whether Jesse has feelings for her; around the same time, West and Bonnie reveal they are dating. Callie confesses her crush on Jesse to Liz, who suggests that Callie invite him to the upcoming school dance. Too nervous to take that course of action, Callie instead invites Jesse back to the bookstore; instead, Jesse gets his father to drive him, Callie and Justin to a bookstore specialising in theatre. The car trip inadvertently reveals that Mr. Mendocino does not know Justin is gay.

With one week before the shows begin, Loren reveals the production is significantly behind on ticket sales. In response, Callie organises to demonstrate the prop cannon to the student body with great success. The first two nights of the musical are a success, with the only problem being a fall by West, injuring his knee. Bonnie's self-centred reaction to the injury in addition to Justin revealing that Bonnie asked him to help her cheat on a test prompts West to break up with her just prior to the third and final show. During intermission, Bonnie locks herself in a supply closet and refuses to continue; with her understudy unavailable, Jesse plays the role for the second act. Though the crew and audience are shocked, his performance received raucous applause. After the play, Jesse asks Callie to the dance.

Though the two are enjoying themselves at the dance, Jesse excuses himself to go to the bathroom. After venting to Liz and looking for over two hours, Callie finds Jesse talking to West outside; it is strongly implied both are gay. Though Callie is understanding, a thoughtless comment from Justin causes her to storm off. She runs into Greg, who apologises for how he treated her and asks her to be his girlfriend. Callie rejects him, walking home by herself.

Jesse and Callie make up, while Matt also admits feelings for Callie and apologises for his rudeness to her. At the final stage crew meeting, the graduating Loren reveals to the crew that he will recommend Callie take over as stage manager the following year.

== Genre and style ==
Drama can be classified as a graphic novel because of the integration of text and comic style art.

This particular genre of Drama has received praise from visual literacy and critical reading professor Meryl Jaffe. Jaffe believes that Telgemeier's illustrations a "sense of place, touch, and feel" which allow readers to further connect with the characters and events in the book, as compared to a regular novel. Jaffe suggests that the depiction of a diverse student body helps to normalize the process of coming out. The diversity featured in the illustrations convey that everyone, regardless of appearance or background, experience similar challenges with self-identity. She argues that Telgemeier's creative decisions, such as using facial expressions to reveal emotion and color to express mood, allow readers to better comprehend the complexities of the situations that the characters experience. Through her illustrations, Telgemeier is able to successfully address difficult subjects, specifically the LGBTQ relationships depicted in Drama.

The graphic novel genre of Drama is also praised by college librarian Eti Berland, who contends that the use of the graphic novel style allows readers to imagine themselves in the book. By having a visual representation of the challenges the characters face, readers not only develop a more personal understanding of LGBTQ experiences, but also gain a better sense of empathy for others in similar situations outside of the novel. For readers who identify as LGBTQ, Berland argues that Telgemeier's positive depiction of LGBTQ characters in Drama serves to validate their experiences, and make them feel more included in modern literature.

Professor of literature Michelle Ann Abate emphasizes certain issues with Telgemeier's graphics. She claims that the illustrations and creative choices in the novel carry white supremacist and racist overtones. For example, Abate points out that West Redding, who bears a striking resemblance to Ashley Wilkes from the movie Gone with the Wind, is the only character in the book whose eye color is depicted. With his blue eyes, blond hair, and role as the male lead for the play Moon Over Mississippi, West seems to symbolize "white racial purity." Another aspect Abate finds troubling is the similarity between Justin performing a dance routine in the school play and the caricature of Jim Crow performing a minstrel dance. This is especially emphasized because Justin plays a comedic role in the performance, similar to the role Jim Crow. Abate argues that the uncanny resemblance between Telgemeier's illustrations and racially charged images presents a tension that complicates the issue of race in Drama, and renders the novel much less progressive than most critics believe.

== Analysis ==
=== Presentation of questioning identity and coming out ===
College librarian Eti Berland credits Raina Telgemeier for using Justin's coming out to show that sharing one's sexual identity is an important aspect of adolescent life. Justin casually reveals his sexual orientation to Callie, conveying the message that coming out has become increasingly normalized in young people's lives.

Berland states that Jesse's case is more complex as he learns to come to terms with his sexual identity. His process of coming out is slow and closely related to his fear of being judged. Performing in the play is a major catalyst to the development of his identity as he comes to terms with his sexuality. Despite the initially worrisome situation Jesse finds himself in after ditching Callie in the school play, his coming out story is "challenging but affirming" where he finds an accepting and supportive community.

West's process of coming out is still burgeoning. He displays signs of perpetually self-questioning tweens who "recognize the fluidity of identity." He represents the idea that the "gay-straight divide" is slowly fading by continuously doubting his sexuality without selecting a label, "still doesn't know if he's really gay, or whatever the character its self is probably pan or bi." Due to this, West is able choose what he wants to self-identify as.

=== Portrayal of hegemonic masculinity ===
Berland states that Raina Telgemeier portrays hegemonic masculinity or, in other words, toxic masculinity in Drama through the experiences of Matt and Jesse, who struggle in adhering to institutional and "social structures" such as dating and sports. In Matt's case, the pressure of society to conform to the ideals of "real men" is more pronounced. Matt says, "Their stuff's way too cutesy for me," in an attempt to assert masculine authority over Callie. Another instance of this is when he displays his "craving for dominance" by telling Callie to focus less on the performers with the "intention of becoming the object of her affections." In the end, Matt expresses remorse for his actions and resists hegemonic masculinity.

Jesse's fight against masculine norms is subtler than Matt's. His hidden desire to perform on stage is held back by his fear of being judged for what he enjoys. He also encounters expectations of masculinity from his father, when asked if Callie was his girlfriend. Once Jesse resists hegemonic masculinity by playing the role of Miss Maybelle, this aids in his ability to realize his identity and come out.

=== Race ===
Literary scholar Michelle Ann Abate presents a more critical view of Drama by arguing that the novel's romanticization of the antebellum South and lack of meaningful discussion of race limits its purpose as a celebration of diversity. For example, Abate contends that the title of the school play, Moon Over Mississippi, which serves as a backdrop for the events in the novel, represents a whitewashing and idealization of Southern plantation life, and ignores the realities of life during that era, including slavery. Although Raina Telgemeier's multicultural cast of characters in the novel is an attempt to promote diversity, the characters' failure to engage in dialogue about race, and power undermines her efforts. Abate observes that the absence of discussion about race among students at Eucalyptus Middle School reflects the situation of many American millennials, in which they reject racism and embrace tolerance and diversity, but are also uncomfortable with actually addressing issues of race. She claims that Drama's troubling treatment of both past and contemporary racial tensions ultimately compromises its status as a progressive novel that realistically portrays LGBTQ characters.

== Reception ==
Between 2012 and 2013, Drama received many positive remarks from various sources. Publishers Weekly stated that Drama "sweetly captur[es]" the challenges that are associated with a middle school production. Booklist Review claimed that "Telgemeier is prodigiously talented at telling cheerful stories with realistic portrayals of middle-school characters." Ada Calhoun of the NY Times Book Review commented, "Telgemeier's use of color, created with design team Gurihiru, is eloquent."

There is also high praise from The Gazette to Telgemeier for using the graphic novel style to present a more mature theme. According to The Gazette: "Telgemeier does a wonderful job of being able to convey a theme usually meant for young adult readers, making it more accessible to the middle school audience the novel was written for." From the School Library Journal: "there is discussion about how this graphic novel promotes a more positive view point when compared to other novels; however, this is not to say that Drama is without its prejudices." The article by Abate suggests that, in attempting to make her novel more inclusive, Telgemeier inadvertently fits her characters into stereotypes. This works directly against the perceived climax of her novel when Jesse fills in for Bonnie and kisses West on stage.

There is, however, some push back amongst libraries under the guise of not wanting to include graphic novels. Charles Brownstein, the director of the Comic Book Legal Defense Fund, does not agree with this genre losing legitimacy due to the inclusion of illustrations. Additionally, Brownstein continues to say, that Drama and other novels, "are clearly a vital aspect of current culture", and that controversy amongst graphic novels with relevant topics of discussion is expected.

Drama has been challenged by some parents and critics for being "sexually explicit", for having "subject matter too advanced for elementary students." and for "promoting the homosexual agenda". Drama has almost consistently received a spot on the American Library Association's Top Ten 10 of Banned Books from 2014 to 2019, and ultimately became the seventh-most banned book between 2010 and 2019. In Texas, Drama was banned three years consecutively between 2014 and 2018. In 2014, a ban in Chapel Hill Elementary School in Mount Pleasant, Texas, put Drama on the American Library Association list of top 10 banned books. However, the details regarding the Chapel Hill Elementary School ban are limited since "there has been no news coverage... so details are thin on the ground." Its use was also restricted in Seele Elementary School in New Braunfels, Texas in 2014. At Kirbyville Junior High in Kirbyville, Texas, the book was also banned for being "politically, racially, or socially offensive" in 2016. During the 2016–17 school year, Drama was banned in the Franklin Independent School District in Franklin, Texas "most likely... due to the storyline involving a crush between two friends of main character Callie." That year, Drama was the only novel noted on the Texas ACLU list of banned books.

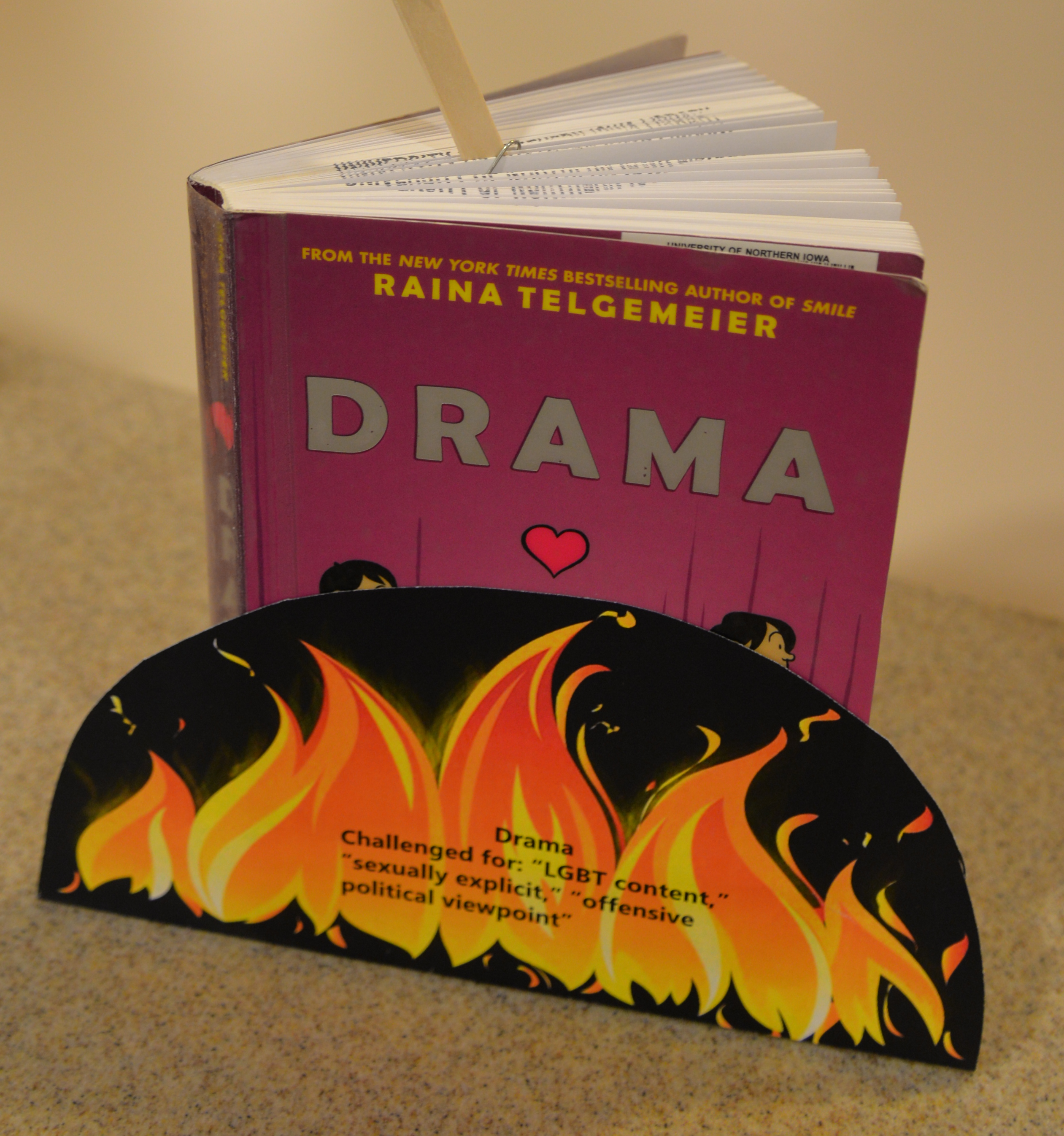
Image of book Drama with an image of fire over the cover art to protest book bans.

Common Sense Media, a company that rates media by age-appropriateness, has marked Drama as suitable for readers over 10 years of age. Common Sense Media acknowledges that "some readers may be uncomfortable with the graphic novel's depiction of homosexual crushes between young teens." Since this is a common point of contention, many schools will include novels with this type of young romance in order to normalize it and promote more equality. It is a popular opinion that in normalizing this type of relationship between homosexual individuals, there will be a positive impact on today's youth.

Michelle Abate, an associate professor of Literature for Children and Young Adults at The Ohio State University, argues that, "...the graphic novel demonstrates the limitations of LGBTQ youth advocacy that does not remain cognizant of intersectionality, while it also highlights the problem with millennial forms of multiculturalism that omit critical discussions about race." In her opinion, "the musical production in Drama of Moon over Mississippi, a play about the Civil War that mimics Gone with the Wind, romanticizes the Antebellum South, thus limiting how progressive the novel can be." According to Abate, the production itself serves as a way of promoting the ideology of white supremacy from that era and therefore negatively impacts the novel's ability to serve as an effective advocate for the LGBTQ community.

In response to backlash for portraying gay characters in a children's book, Telgemeier replied by saying she is "grateful Scholastic has been willing to stand behind me on Drama." She also believes that "sexuality is a part of your identity that doesn't necessarily apply to what you are doing with other people when you are eight or nine years old," and that she doesn't attempt to force her viewpoints on anyone. She explained that her "agenda is love and friendship. People will make of it what they will and I can't let that sway the things I believe and the things I write about." Telgemeier continues to say "If a chaste heterosexual kiss had happened in Drama, no one would have batted an eye", meaning to discuss the double standard of the objections to this novel. This idea is consistent with other sources and praises for Drama such as The Gazette and Brownstein, that fully support the normalization of homosexual relationships, and also support her deliverance in the form of a graphic novel for this subjectively more mature theme.

== Awards ==
In 2012, Drama was declared a Notable Children's Books and a Teen Top Ten by the Association of Library Services to Children (ALSC) and the Young Adult Library Services Association (YALSA), which are all as part of the American Library Association.

Both Publishers Weekly and the Washington Post list Drama as one of the Best Books of 2012.

Also in 2012, NPR noted Drama as a novel that went under-recognized. In the NPR book review, Glen Weldon explained how, "If somebody handed this book to [him] in the seventh grade, [he] still would have been the same self-conscious jerk [he is], but it would have helped. It would have helped so much."

NPR also named Drama a "5 Great Summer Reads for Teens" in 2013. Petra Mayer, on NPR, described the artwork in the novel as "...simple but animated, and delightfully expressive."

Drama also won a 2013 Stonewall Book Award in Children's and Young Adult Literature, an award given by the American Library Association that serves to recognize authors who tackle LGBTQ related topics.

Drama was nominated for a Harvey Award in 2013 by a group of comic-book professionals for excellence in comics. The Harvey Award is one of the most prestigious and oldest accomplishments within the comic industry.

Also in 2013, the American Library Association deemed Drama as a Top 10 Great Graphic Novels for Teens.

Drama was placed on the Rainbow List in 2013, which is an annual list of books that are reviewed by the Committee of the Gay, Lesbian, Bisexual, and Transgender Round Table of the American Library Association.
