= Yaroslava Strikha =

Ukrainian translator

- Ярослава Стріха
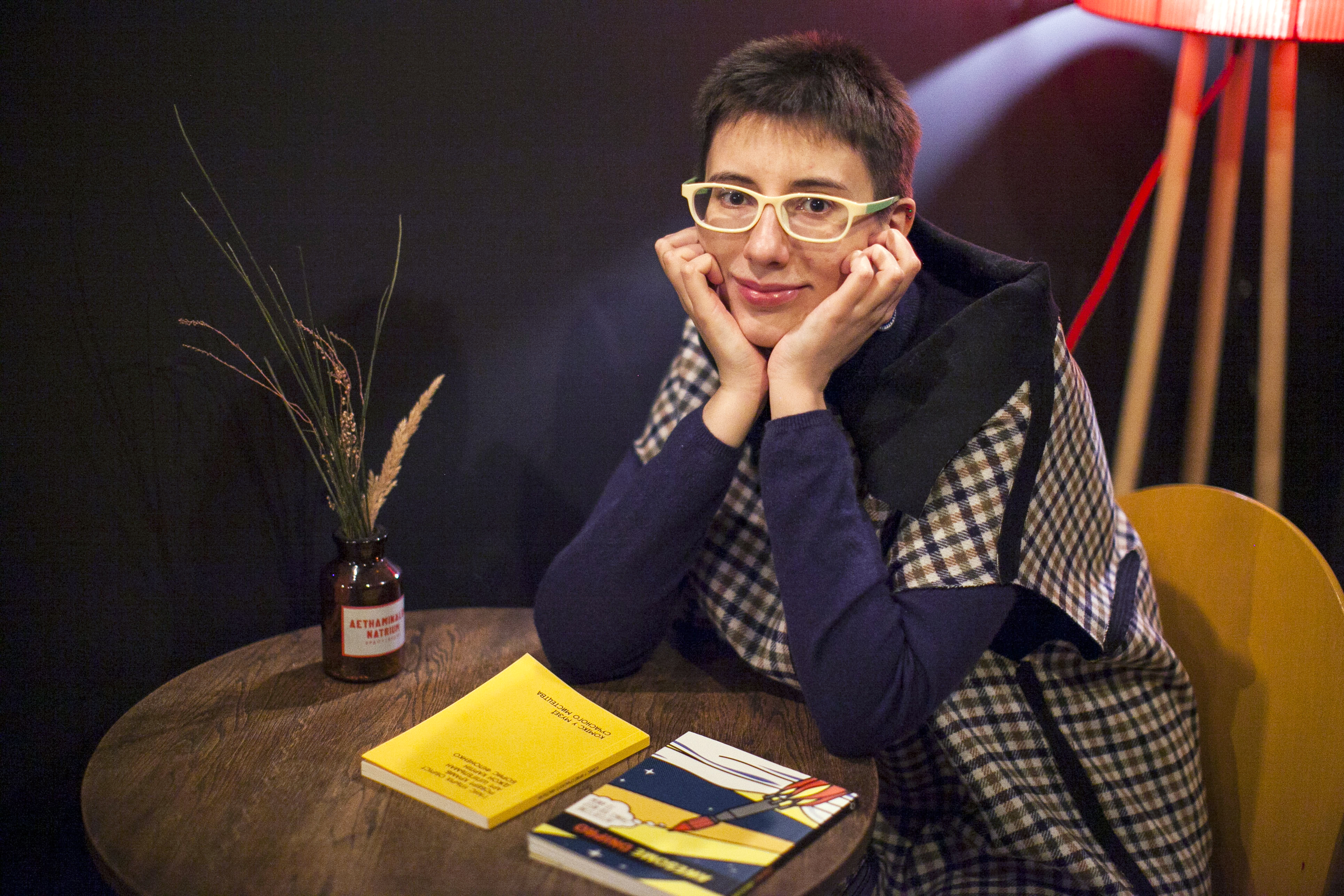
- Strikha in 2019
- Born: 27 August 1988 (age 38); Kyiv, Ukrainian SSR, Soviet Union
- Education: National University of Kyiv-Mohyla Academy * Harvard University
- Occupations: Literary translator * Literary critic

Yaroslava Maksymivna Strikha (Ukrainian: Ярослава Максимівна Стріха; born 27 August 1988) is a Ukrainian literary translator and critic, and a Doctor of Philosophy in Slavic languages and literatures from Harvard University.

== Early life and education ==
Yaroslava Strikha was born in 1988 in Kyiv into a family of academics and writers. Her father, Maksym Strikha, is a Ukrainian physicist, translator and public figure, while her mother, Nataliia Starchenko, is a historian at the Institute of History of Ukraine of the National Academy of Sciences.

She studied at the Ukrainian Humanities Lyceum in Kyiv and later graduated from the National University of Kyiv ‑ Mohyla Academy. Strikha went on to pursue graduate studies in Slavic languages and literatures at the Harvard Graduate School of Arts and Sciences, where she received her PhD in 2017 with a dissertation on autobiographical writing in modern Ukrainian literature.

== Career ==
Strikha works primarily as a literary translator from English and other languages into Ukrainian and as a literary critic. She has translated prose, non‑fiction, comics and graphic novels, including works by Kate Atkinson, Alan Moore, Art Spiegelman, Walter Isaacson, Julian Barnes and others.

In interviews Strikha has described translation as a way of understanding how texts are constructed and as a form of critical reading. She has also spoken publicly about comics and graphic narrative, the status of translation in Ukraine and the role of public intellectuals in contemporary culture.

In The Ukrainians she was characterized as an “omnivorous reader and storyteller”.

== Selected translations ==
Strikha’s translated works include, among others:

- A. S. Byatt – The Children’s Book (Ukrainian: Книга для дітей), co‑translated with Maksym Strikha (Tempora, 2024).
- Julian Barnes – The Only Story (Одним одна історія) and The Man in the Red Coat (Чоловік у червоному халаті) (Tempora, 2019–2022).
- Paul Auster – The New York Trilogy (Нью-йоркська трилогія) (Vydavnytstvo Staroho Leva, 2020).
- Henry David Thoreau – Walden; or, Life in the Woods (Волден, або Життя в лісах) (Tempora, 2020).
- Art Spiegelman – Maus (Ukrainian two‑volume edition, Vydavnytstvo, 2020–2023).
- Alan Moore and Dave Gibbons – Watchmen (Вартові) (Ridna Mova, 2018).
- Scott McCloud – Understanding Comics (Зрозуміти комікси. Невидиме мистецтво) (Ridna Mova, 2019).
- Kay O’Neill – The Tea Dragon Society and Princess Princess Ever After (Товариство чайних драконів; Принцеса + принцеса. Довго і щасливо) (Ridna Mova, 2019).
- Walter Isaacson – Leonardo da Vinci (Nash Format, 2019).
- Shaun Bythell – The Diary of a Bookseller (Щоденник книгаря) (Nash Format, 2019).
- Amos Oz and Fania Oz‑Salzberger – Jews and Words (Євреї і слова) (Dukh i Litera, 2017).

== Public engagement ==
Strikha frequently appears at Ukrainian literary festivals and translation‑focused events, including the Translatorium festival and Lviv BookForum, where she has taken part in discussions on translation, world literature and comics.

== Personal life ==
Strikha lives and works in Kyiv.
