= Ghosts (graphic novel) =

Graphic novel by Raina Telgemeier

- Ghosts cover
- Author: Raina Telgemeier
- Genre: Graphic novel; Fiction
- Publisher: Scholastic/Graphix
- Publication date: September 2016
- Media type: Print (Hardcover and Paperback)
- Pages: 256
- Awards: Eisner for Best Publication for Kids, 2017
- ISBN: 978-0-545-54067-4
- Dewey Decimal: 741.5/973
- LC Class: PZ7.7.T45 Gh 2016
- Website: goraina.com/ghosts

Ghosts is a fictional graphic novel written by Raina Telgemeier which tells the story of a young girl named Catrina and her family, who have recently moved to Bahía de la Luna (a fictional town incorporating aspects of Half Moon Bay, Pacifica, and Santa Cruz) in northern California. The move was intended to help the health of Catrina's little sister, Maya, who has cystic fibrosis.

== Plot ==
The novel opens as Catrina, her younger sister Maya, and their parents are ordering at the drive-through of a fictional Double-Back Burger (the colors and logos of which are based on In-N-Out Burger) before leaving southern California for Bahía de la Luna. Energetic Maya is excited to move, but Cat misses her friends back home. As the sisters are exploring their new neighborhood, they are surprised by a boy named Carlos Calaveras, who turns out to be one of their new neighbors, and who explains the town's fascination with Dia de los Muertos and ghosts, which disturbs Cat and enthralls Maya.

Carlos takes the sisters on a ghost tour, where they do come across actual ghosts. The ghosts befriend Maya, but when Maya abruptly drops a drink, they become frantic and try to suck her breath out of her lungs. Maya, who has cystic fibrosis, falls into a coughing fit and is hospitalized, though she refuses to fear the ghosts. Cat makes friends with her classmates Ry and Seoyoung, but is antagonistic towards Carlos as she blames him for Maya's accident. When Maya returns home, the girls' mother explains that she regrets turning her back on her Mexican heritage, and Cat learns she was named after La Catrina, a Day of the Dead folk icon, and goes to town with Ry and Seoyoung on Halloween Night to trick or treat, where she meets several friendly ghosts and reconnects with Carlos, developing feelings for him.

Maya, who due to her condition was not allowed to trick or treat, befriends Carlos's uncle José (who is in fact the ghost of a child who died young) once Cat and Carlos return to their home, and she and Cat accept their Mexican heritage and the presence of the ghosts, finding that homemade Mexican foods have appeared next to the ofrenda of their grandmother.

== Development ==
The magical realism of Ghosts marks a sharp change from Telgemeier's earlier works, which have been autobiographical (Smile [2010]; Sisters [2014]) or realistic fiction (Drama [2012]). Instead, Telgemeier depicts the titular ghosts as real but benevolent presences to help Catrina understand death and deal with Maya's terminal illness.

Telgemeier stated she was inspired to write Ghosts in part by the death of her young cousin Sabina, who died from cancer at the age of 13. The scenes from the Day of the Dead celebration were left blank in the initial manuscript submitted to Scholastic. Telgemeier waited until she had attended a Day of the Dead celebration in San Francisco to accurately express her experience in the story, which she later called "one of the most moving nights of my life."

Aspects of the town of Bahía de la Luna are inspired by Half Moon Bay, Moss Beach, Monterey, Morro Bay, and Santa Cruz.

The panels were colored by Braden Lamb.

== Reception, awards, and recognition ==
The book received positive reviews. Dan Kois, reviewing for The New York Times called it "a typically empathetic and complex work from a gifted comics creator". Kirkus Reviews said Telgemeier showed "superior visual storytelling" in keeping readers "emotinally [sic] engaged and unable to put down this compelling tale". According to School Library Journal, it is a "can't miss-addition to middle grade graphic novel shelves".

In 2017, Ghosts won an Eisner Award for Best Publication for Kids (ages 9–12) and the Dwayne McDuffie Award for Kids' Comics.

As of 2017 the paperback version had spent several weeks on The New York Times Best Sellers list under the category "Paperback Graphic Books."

=== Appropriation charges ===
After the novel was published, several readers pointed out the cultural appropriation of Dia de los Muertos as well as the problematic sanitized portrayal of the history of Spanish missions in California. Telgemeier responded by posting a short essay acknowledging the critical viewpoints on her website.
