= Heidy Juárez Calle =

Peruvian lawyer and politician

Heidy Juárez
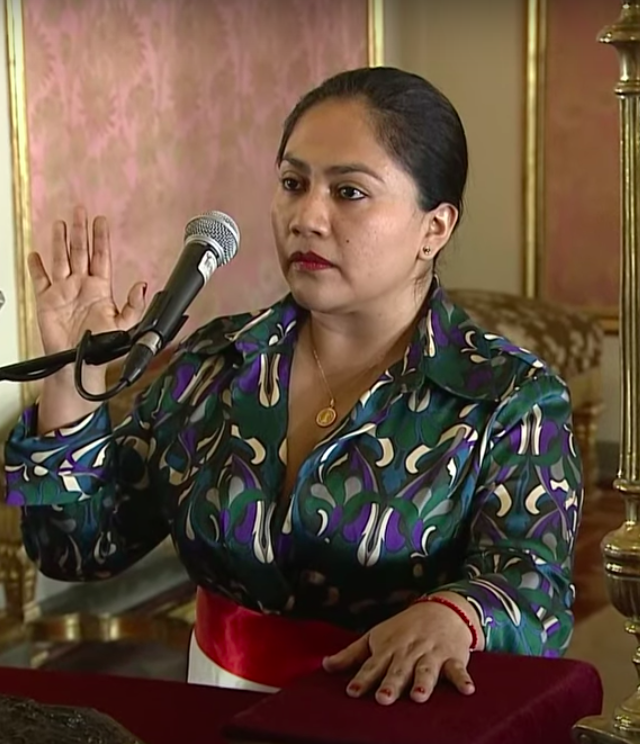
- Juárez in 2022

Member of Congress
- In office 27 July 2021 – 26 July 2026
- Constituency: Piura

Minister of Women and Vulnerable Populations
- In office 25 November – 7 December 2022
- President: Pedro Castillo
- Prime Minister: Betssy Chávez
- Preceded by: Claudia Dávila
- Succeeded by: Grecia Rojas

Personal details
- Born: Heidy Lisbeth Juárez Calle; 16 February 1984 (age 42) San Martín, Peru
- Party: Podemos Perú (2022; since 2023); Independent (2022–23); APP (2016–2022)
- Education: Antenor Orrego University

Heidy Lisbeth Juárez Calle (born February 16, 1984) is a Peruvian lawyer and politician. She served as Minister of Women and Vulnerable Populations in the administration of Pedro Castillo between November and December 2022, replacing Claudia Dávila; she is also currently a member of the Congress of the Republic of Peru representing a district in the Piura Region. Juárez is a native of Rioja, and studied at the Antenor Orrego Private University. She was replaced as minister by Grecia Rojas Ortiz.
