= Laura Shovan =

American author and poet

Laura Shovan is an American author and poet.

Since 2002, Shovan has participated in the Artist in Education program for the Maryland State Arts Council. Shovan was the 24th writer-in-residence for the Howard County Poetry and Literature Society in Maryland, and she visited and taught at local schools as part of the program.

Her poetry chapbook, Mountain, Log, Salt, and Stone won the inaugural Clarinda Harriss Poetry Prize and was published by CityLit Press in 2010. Her debut novel for children was the middle grade verse book, The Last Fifth Grade of Emerson Elementary. In 2016, the book won the Children's and Young Adult Bloggers' Literary Award (Cybils Award) for poetry. Shovan's book, Takedown, was published in 2018. The book was selected for the American Library Association's Amelia Bloomer List, a feminist book project. It was a Junior Library Guild Gold Standard selection.

Along with Saadia Faruqi, Shovan co-wrote the book A Place at the Table, which was published in 2020. The book is about two 11-year-olds—Pakistani-American Sara and Jewish Elizabeth—who develop a friendship after becoming cooking partners in class. It was named a Sydney Taylor Notable book by the American Library Association.

Since 2022, Laura Shovan has taught for the Vermont College of Fine Arts' Master of Fine Arts program in Writing for Children and Young Adults.

== Works ==
- Mountain, Log, Salt, and Stone (2010, CityLit Press)
- The Last Fifth Grade of Emerson Elementary (2016, Random House Children's Books)
- Takedown (2018, Random House Children's Books)
- A Place at the Table (2020, Clarion Books), co-written by Saadia Faruqi
- Welcome to Monsterville (2023, Apprentice House Press)
