= Weirdo (graphic novel) =

2024 graphic novel

- Date: September 17, 2024
- Page count: 320 pages
- Publisher: First Second

Creative team
- Writer: Tony Weaver Jr.
- Artists: Jes and Cin Wibowo
- ISBN: 9781250772879

Weirdo is a 2024 graphic novel memoir written by Tony Weaver Jr. and illustrated by Jes and Cin Wibowo. It received widely positive reception, including being nominated for the 2025 Eisner Award for Best Publication for Kids.

== Plot ==
The book covers Weaver's experiences as a 11-year-old boy. After severe bullying from his peers, Weaver attempts suicide. The book follows Weaver's recovery, finding a community, and embracing being himself.

== Background ==
In interviews, Weaver discussed a desire to raise awareness about mental health issues and to bring positive representation of Black children and other people of color into graphic novels as inspirations for the work.

== Reception ==
The book was given starred reviews by Kirkus Reviews, Publishers Weekly, and School Library Journal. Publishers Weekly noted the shift from full color to black and white to back to color to symbolize Weaver's struggles and eventual recovery, and said the book "culminates in a touching story of belonging, in which Weaver realistically depicts the many small steps required to becoming one’s own hero."

The Stanford Daily also positively reviewed the book.

=== Accolades ===
Year	Award/Honor	Result	Ref.
2026	Great Graphic Novels for Teens	Included	
2025	Eisner Award for Best Publication for Kids	Shortlisted	
2025	Harvey Award for Best Children's Book	Shortlisted	
2025	Libby Book Award Middle Grade Book	2nd place	
2024	Publishers Weekly Best Middle Grade Books of the Year	Included	
2024	School Library Journal Best Graphic Novels	Included	
2024	New York Public Library Best Books for Kids	Included	
2024	Graphic Novels & Comics Round Table Best Graphic Novels for Children	Included	

== Sequel ==
A sequel is planned to release in Spring 2027, with a focus on the effects of standardized testing.

== See also ==
- Lunar Boy - graphic novel by Jes and Cin Wibowo.
