= Lunar Boy =

2024 graphic novel by Cin and Jes Wibowo

- Date: May 14, 2024
- Page count: 240 pages
- Publisher: HarperAlley

Creative team
- Writers: Cin Wibowo, Jes Wibowo
- Artists: Cin Wibowo, Jes Wibowo
- ISBN: 9780063057609

Lunar Boy is a science fiction graphic novel by Cin and Jes Wibowo. It follows a young boy who was found on a moon as a child and longs to return there after difficult changes in his life, only to question his wish after he makes new friends. It was published on May 14, 2024 by HarperAlley.

== Plot ==
Indu, a trans boy who was discovered alone on a moon as a child, has spent his life with his adoptive mom on a spaceship. When his mom marries, he struggles to acclimate to his new stepfamily and home on the Indonesia-based New Earth. After his penpal and crush Noah stops writing back, Indu begs the moon to take him back and it answers, giving him until New Year's Eve. As the year goes on, Indu finds new community, and starts to question his decision.

== Reception ==
The book was given starred reviews by Kirkus Reviews, School Library Journal, and Publishers Weekly. Kirkus Reviews stated "this luminously illustrated graphic novel offers readers a lovely story of change, understanding, identity, and belonging."

=== Accolades ===
Year	Award/Honor	Result	Ref.
2025	Stonewall Book Award - Children's Category	Won	
2025	GLAAD Media Award for Outstanding Graphic Novel/Anthology	Shortlisted	
2025	Ignyte Award for Outstanding Comics Team	Won	
2024	Harvey Award for Best Children's Book	Shortlisted	
2024	American Library Association Rainbow Book List - Fiction	Top Ten	

== See also ==
- Weirdo - graphic novel also illustrated by Cin and Jes Wibowo
