= Leave Me Alone! =

2016 picture book

- Author: Vera Brosgol
- Publisher: Roaring Book Press
- Publication date: September 13, 2016
- Pages: unpaged
- Awards: Caldecott Honor
- ISBN: 978-1-62672-441-9

Leave Me Alone! is a 2016 picture book by Vera Brosgol about a grandmother who wishes to be left alone to finish her knitting. The book was a recipient of a 2017 Caldecott Honor for its illustrations.

== Plot ==
As winter approaches, an old woman decides to knit sweaters for her many grandchildren. However, due to noise in her home, she is unable to concentrate, so she decides to sit outside by the stars to knit in peace. However, on her way there, she encounters bears, goats, and even aliens who she all tells to leave her alone. Eventually, she is finally able to get her peace and knit the sweaters.
