= The Cartoonists Club =

2025 graphic novel

- Date: April 1, 2025
- Page count: 288 pages
- Publisher: Graphix/Scholastic

Creative team
- Writer: Scott McCloud and Raina Telgemeier
- Artist: Scott McCloud and Raina Telgemeier
- Inker: Ray Baehr
- Letterer: Jessica Post
- Colorist: Beniam C. Hollman
- ISBN: 978-1338777215

The Cartoonists Club is a 2025 children's graphic novel by Scott McCloud and Raina Telgemeier. It follows four kids and a librarian who start a club for cartooning at their school and explores and explains various concepts related to the field.

== Plot ==
While at algebra class at Craft Middle School, a boy named Howard passes a girl named Makayla a sketch mocking their teacher Mr. Rugget, making her laugh. When they leave class Howard's drawings to fall out of his bag, impressing Makayla, who is a passionate storyteller. Makayla and Howard form a plan to create a comic with Makayla as writer and Howard as artist, and with encouragement from the school librarian Ms. Fatima, the two decide to take it further and establish the Cartoonists Club. The next day, they are joined by Art, a non-binary student, and Lynda, a quiet girl who is nervous about sharing her drawings but agrees to join after the other kids compliment them. Ms. Fatima has the kids play a game called quanto comics, where each person comes up with a title and the person next to them creates a short comic with the title.

When Art's father tells the kids about zines and minicomics, the club members create their own minicomics the next day. Makayla creates a fantasy comic called Hikaru and the Cat and sells a copy to another student, while Howard gives out copies of his comic, Mr. Nugget Vs. Tofu Pup, during algebra, interrupting class. To his surprise, Mr. Rugget actually enjoys his comic, but says he will have to contact Howard's father if his disruptive behavior continues, concerning Howard as his father dislikes comics.

Later, Lynda reveals to Ms. Fatima she has created an autobiographical comic, but is afraid to share it as she feels it is too personal. Ms. Fatima tells Lynda about genres and explains that her comic is a memoir, and that it is okay to keep it to herself is she does not want to share. Afterwards, Ms. Fatima teaches the whole club about expressions, body language, and posing. That night, Howard confronts his father about his desire to be a cartoonist.

Sometime later, the Cartoonists Club apply for an upcoming comics convention. As they prepare, Ms. Fatima teaches the club about paneling and how it can be used to influence the reader's perception, breaking the fourth wall to do so. Lynda shows the others her autobiographical comic, Papi's Dancing Shoes, which is about her father who used to dance with her before becoming ill and dying.

At the convention, the kids meet famous webcomic creator Jackie, who turns out to be friends with Ms. Fatima. Howard's father, having come to realize how important comics are to his son, helps the kids set up their table. At first, the kids' table gets no visitors, disappointing Makayla. She takes a break and runs into Jackie, who tells her about her own experience at her first comics convention. When Makayla gets back, kids from school cosplaying as Makayla's Hikaru and the Cat characters show up, and a crowd of people appear behind them, having been recommended to go there by Jackie. At the end of the convention, a girl approaches the Cartoonists Club's table and asks Lynda if she ever had doubts about sharing her comics, and Lynda invites her into the club.

== Reception ==
The Cartoonists Club received starred reviews from Kirkus Reviews, Publishers Weekly, School Library Journal, and Booklist, with Booklist also listing it as a 2025 Booklist Editors' Choice title. Kirkus Reviews said that "readers learn the process of creating and sharing comics right alongside the characters", and gave particular attention to the "bold" coloring. They concluded that the book was "highly imaginative and cleverly conceived". Publishers Weekly described the book as an "energizing and informative collaboration", saying the book "seamlessly integrates heartfelt narrative with approachable how-to guides". Similarly, AJ Frost of Comics Beat positively commented on the balancing of the storyline and the book's educational elements, stating "the narrative never feels didactic, despite being packed with insights".

=== Accolades ===
Year	Award/honor	Result	Reference
2026	Eisner Award for Best Publication for Kids	Won	
2025	Harvey Award for Best Children's Book	Won	
2025	Graphic Novels & Comics Round Table Best Graphic Novels for Children	Top Ten	
