= Plain Jane and the Mermaid =

2024 graphic novel by Vera Brosgol

- Date: May 7, 2024
- Page count: 368 pages
- Publisher: First Second

Creative team
- Writer: Vera Brosgol
- Artist: Vera Brosgol
- ISBN: 9781250314864

Plain Jane and the Mermaid is a 2024 fantasy graphic novel by Vera Brosgol. It follows Jane, who must venture into a dangerous underwater world with the help of a selkie when her fiancé is kidnapped by a mermaid. It won the 2025 Eisner Award for Best Publication for Kids.

== Plot ==
After the sudden death of her parents, Jane, a young woman who has been bullied over her appearance her whole life, must find a husband or lose her home to her hostile cousin. She tries proposing to Peter, a vain fisherman. He initially agrees, but Jane inadvertently offends him by implying he can use her money to do nothing all day and he storms off. Peter ends up by the shore of a lake, where he gets lured in and then dragged underwater by a beautiful mermaid as Jane watches.

Jane rushes to town and tries to tell townsfolk, but no one believes, except for one old woman named Doris who brings Jane to her house, where she lives with her husband Reg. She gives Jane a potion that will allow her to breathe and speak underwater, a cape to protect her from the cold water, and a magic rock that will let her walk on the lake floor so long as she touches it; however, if she does not resurface in three days, she will drown. Meanwhile, Peter, who can breathe due the mermaid's magic, is brought to the mermaid's village, where the mermaid Loreley lives with two other mermaids, Mesuline and Cleodora. Loreley tells Peter that she is in love with him and plans to marry him.

Underwater, Jane soon finds a house with a chained up seal in the yard. In the house, she is attacked by a miniature water demon named Vodnik, who believes she has been sacrificed to be his bride. To escape, she tells Vodnik that she is hungry, andhe begrudgingly brings her to where he gets lobsters to eat, taking them from lobster traps sent from the surface, though binding hands and feet to keep her from running away. Jane tricks him into entering one of the traps, and he is eaten by the lobsters, who in their gratitude break Jane's binds. Jane then frees the seal by breaking his bonds with a rock, and he reveals he can talk and reluctantly agrees to help her find the mermaid's village in exchange for his freedom. The seal refuses to tell his name, so Jane calls him Mr. Whiskers, after her cat.

On their way to the village, Jane and Mr. Whiskers find a shipwreck with skeletons with seaweed growing out of them. Jane finds a diary, which reveals the ship sank after its captain fell in love with a mermaid, who sank the ship when the crew tried to restrain him. Mr. Whiskers reveals to Jane's horror that the mermaids eat young men to restore her own youth. The skeletons suddenly awaken and attack, believing Jane is the mermaid. They manage to restrain Mr. Whiskers while Jane grabs an anchor and ends up falling into the deep

At the mermaid village, Peter tries to escape after Loreley gets mad at Mesuline and Cleodora and throws a trident at them. Loreley catches him, and reveals her true plan and locks him in a cage. Mesuline and Cleodora are apologetic, considering him nicer than their other victims, but refuse to free him.

Alone, Jane runs into a giant anglerfish-like monster, and ends up stuck in a caved-in tunnel. In a flashback, it is revealed Jane had an infant brother named Jamie. One day at the beach Jamie went missing and was presumed to have drowned. In the present Jane escapes the tunnel using the rock and her cape, which she unknits to form a rope, but soon passes out from the cold. Jane later awakens in a hut, with a seal pelt wrapped around her and a man watching over. The man reveals that he is Mr. Whiskers and is actually a selkie. Jane also discovers Jamie survived and has been raised by the selfies, but behaves ferally and does not recognize her.

Jane, wearing Mr. Whiskers' pelt to keep from freezing, and Mr. Whiskers travel to the mermaid's village, where the feast of Peter is laid out. While Mr. Whiskers and the freed Peter take on Mesuline and Cleodora, Loreley drags Jane into a room of mirrors and forces her to confront her reflection and tries to convince her she is worthless, but Jane refuses, realizing how much Mr. Whiskers cared for her, and turns it on Loreley, exposing how desperate she is to stay beautiful. Loreley tries to burn Jane alive in the thermal vents surrounding the village, but Jane shoves her stone in Loreley's mouth, causing her to sink and burn while Jane rises.

Cleodora and Mesuline, having being tied up by Mr. Whiskers and Peter, reveal that Doris was their sister and that she fell in love with one of the men brought down by Loreley. She went to be with him on the surface, however, emerging from the water immediately turned her into an elderly human woman, and according to Loreley Reg rejected her upon her transformation and she died shortly afterwards. Jane tells them that Doris is alive and still with her husband, and the two decide to abandon their mermaid lives to be with Doris even if it means becoming old.

Afterwards, Jane returns to the house with Jamie, and with Jamie acting as the male heir, is allowed to keep it. As she goes around town, she meets with Peter, Doris, and the now elderly and human Mesuline and Cleodora. The book ends with her drinking another water-breathing potion and heading back into the ocean.

== Reception ==
The book received largely positive reception, including starred reviews from the Horn Book, School Library Journal, and Publishers Weekly. Publishers Weekly closed their review by saying "this rollicking tale of an insecure girl finding her strength and breaking from tradition is another triumph for Brosgol."

Kirkus Reviews described the book as an "explicit response to society's valuing of beauty and contempt for its absence, especially when it comes to girls and women."

Samantha Puc of The Beat stated that the novel was complex, concluding that the book was a "brilliant fairytale that dismantles several toxic tropes, but leans into others."

=== Accolades ===
Year	Award/Honor	Result	Ref.
2025	Eisner Award for Best Publication for Kids	Won	
2025	American Library Association's Great Graphic Novels for Teens	Top Ten	
2025	Rise: A Feminist Book Project	Top Ten	
2024	Graphic Novels & Comics Round Table's Best Graphic Novels for Children	Top Ten	
