= Go with the Flow (graphic novel) =

2020 comic by Lily Williams and Karen Schneemann

- Page count: 336 pages
- Publisher: First Second/Macmillan

Creative team
- Writer: Lily Williams and Karen Schneemann
- Artist: Lily Williams

Original publication
- Date of publication: 2020
- Language: English
- ISBN: 978-1250143174

Go with the Flow is a graphic novel by Lily Williams and Karen Schneemann. It was published on January 14, 2020 by First Second and Macmillan, and was followed by a sequel titled Look on the Bright Side in 2023.

== Plot ==
After new girl Sasha bleeds through her pants, three existing friends—Abby, Brit, Christine—come to her aid. The four sophomores are frustrated when their school fails to restock pads and tampons. After being dismissed by the male principal, the friends protest the administration's refusal to acknowledge menstruation. However, their friendship is tested when Abby takes the protest too far.

Look on the Bright Side continues following the characters from the first novel, including a subplot with Christine coming to terms with her same-sex attraction and her crush on Abby.

== Development ==
The book is based on The Mean Magenta, a webcomic previously released by the authors.

== Reception ==
Go with the Flow received positive reception from Kirkus Reviews, The Horn Book and School Library Journal, with Kirkus Reviews also positively reviewing Look on the Bright Side. Reviews remarked on the diverse cast, with Tanya Auger of The Horn Book noting that the main characters "differ in race, sexual orientation, family structure, body type, and period pain".

In 2022, the book was subject to a book ban in Keller, Texas.

=== Accolades ===
Year	Award/Honor	Result	Ref.
2020	Los Angeles Times Book Prize - Young Adult Literature	Shortlisted	
2021	Eisner Award for Best Publication for Kids (ages 9-12)	Shortlisted	
2021	American Library Association's Great Graphic Novels for Teens	Top Ten	
