= Tony Weaver Jr. =

American cartoonist and voice actor

- Born: Atlanta, Georgia
- Education: Elon University
- Known for: Weird Enough Productions
- Notable work: Weirdo

Instagram information
- Page: TonyWeaverJr
- Years active: October 2013 - present
- Followers: 554,000

TikTok information
- Page: TonyWeaverJr
- Years active: 26 August 2020 - present
- Followers: 1,000,000

X information
- Handle: @TonyWeaverJr
- Display name: Tony Weaver Jr.
- Years active: January 2013 - present
- Followers: 9,730

YouTube information
- Channel: Tony Weaver, Jr
- Years active: 17 June 2022 - present
- Subscribers: 83,600
- Views: 18,311,262
- Last updated: August 2026
- Website: www.tonyweaverjr.com

Tony Weaver Jr. is an American cartoonist, nonprofit executive, voice actor, and YouTuber who is best known for his graphic novel Weirdo. He also played Saito in the English dub of The Ghost In The Shell. He is the founder of nonprofit Nerds for Literacy and heads his own company, Weird Enough Productions.

== Early life ==
Weaver is from Atlanta, Georgia. During his youth, he wrote and performed poems at the Tupac Amaru Shakur Center for the Arts. He has a Bachelor of Fine Arts from Elon University in Elon, North Carolina, where he double-majoring in acting and communications. As a child, he struggled with mental health and attempted suicide. He watched anime to cope with his mental struggles.

== Graphic novels ==
Weaver Jr. is the CEO of his own company, Weird Enough Productions, focused on media starring Black protagonists. He founded it in college off of a grant he received: his official title was Weirdo-in-Chief. He served as manager. Through the company, he produced manga The UnCommons and graphic novel Dream Frontier. They also created a web series, Weird Enough to Work. He has stated his reason for creating the media came from the microaggressions he received during school, including from teachers, and what he viewed as negative media images of Michael Brown after he was killed. Much of his work is inspired by Shōnen manga.

In 2024, Weaver Jr. released his graphic novel memoir Weirdo. The book was inspired by his childhood experiences, and was made to help black children going through similar experiences he did. For the book, he visited his parents and locked himself in his childhood bedroom in an attempt to "visit [himself as a] kid again". He was trying to go from "[a] fully actualized adult to [a] scared, vulnerable and lonely child". The book utilities different color palettes to represent Weaver's emotional states, and at one point fully moves into black and white. It also heavily utilizes references to popular media. The book was removed from a Minnesota school after an administrator objected to the LGBTQ themes.

In January 2025, he visited several schools across the United States to debut Weirdo and to promote messages of self-acceptance and self empowerment.

== Acting ==
He appeared in a Coca-Cola ad in 2020. He voiced Nishimura in the English dub of Snowball Earth and Saito in the English dub of The Ghost in the Shell, both in 2026. He stated this was a fulfillment of his long dream.

== Nonprofit ==
Nerds for Literacy logo

He created nonprofit Nerds for Literacy, focused on getting kids to read books that interest them and reducing literacy challenges. It was inspired by observing peers he viewed as very intelligent and their struggles with reading.

== Views ==
Weaver is an vocal advocate against book censorship, believing that politics should not be kept out of online discussions on books (such as on BookTok), and that politics and access to literature are deeply linked. He has posted rebuttals against book censorship on TikTok, and compares the practice to historical laws that kept Black Americans illiterate. He has also called for "embracing your nerdiness".

== Filmography ==
Year	Title	Role	Notes
2026	The Gotta Catch 'Em All Gameshow	Contestant	
2026	Snowball Earth	Nishimura (voice)	English dub
2026	The Ghost in the Shell	Saito (voice)	English dub

== Bibliography ==
- Weaver Jr., Tony (17 September 2024). Weirdo. Illustrated by Jes Wibowo and Cin Wibowo. First Second Books. ISBN 9781250772879.
- Weaver Jr., Tony (3 August 2027). Weirdo: Pass or Fail. Illustrated by Miriam Serafin. First Second Books. ISBN 1250772893.

== Honors and accolades ==
Weaver was named a NBC Black Male Achievement Fellow in 2016. He was also included in Forbes's 2018 30 Under 30, making him the first comic writer to be named on it. In 2021, he was included in the Harvey B. Gantt Center's Visual Vanguard exhibit, which focused on Black people in the Carolinas. He was honorary chair of the American Library Association's Banned Books Week in 2026.

Year	Award/Honor	Work	Result	Ref.
2026	Great Graphic Novels for Teens	Weirdo	Included	
2025	Eisner Award for Best Publication for Kids	Weirdo	Finalist	
2025	Harvey Award for Best Children's Book	Weirdo	Finalist	
2024	Publishers Weekly Best Middle Grade Books of the Year	Weirdo	Included	
