= Raina Telgemeier =

American cartoonist, illustrator, and writer (born 1977)

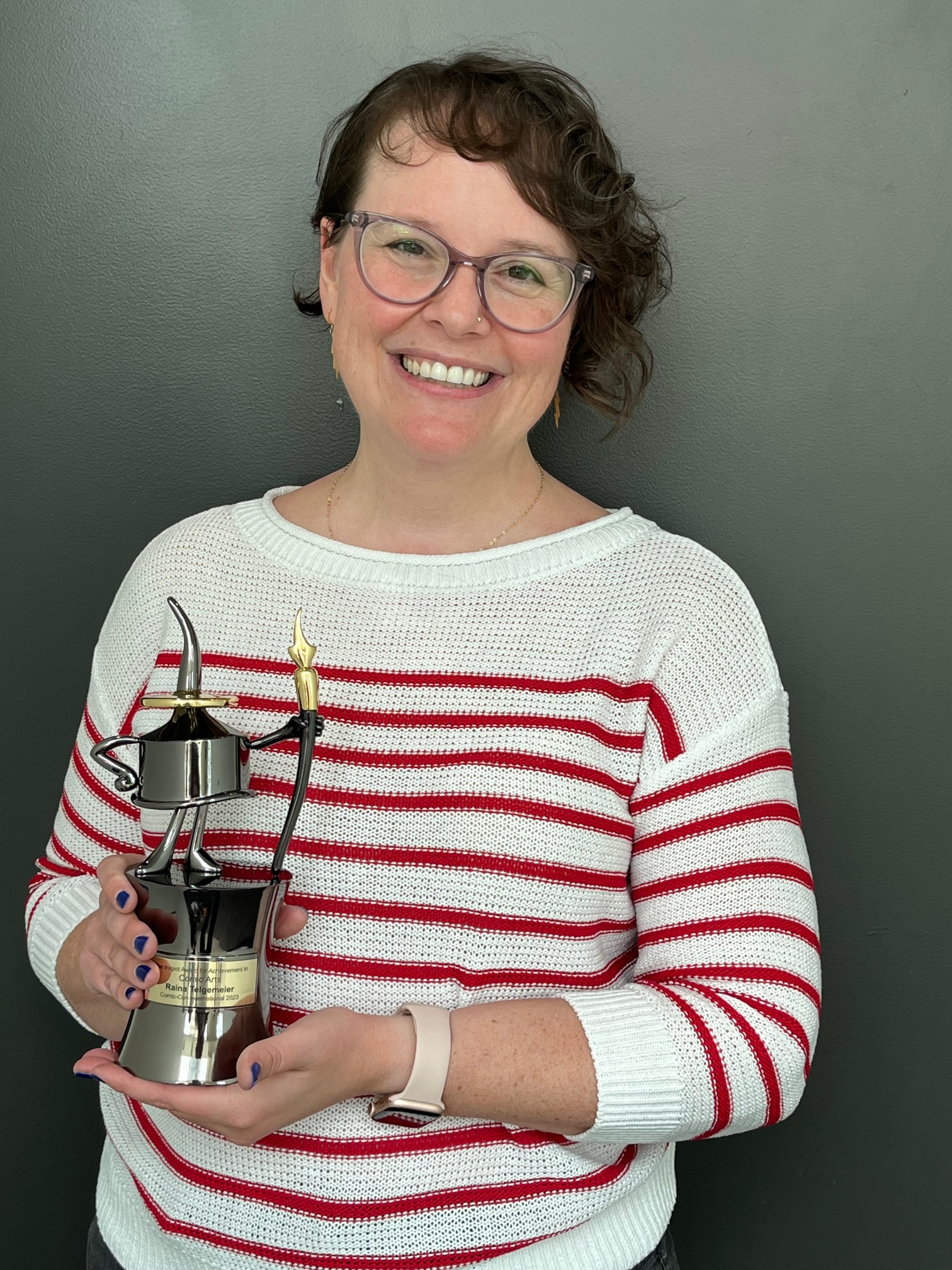
- Telgemeier receiving an Inkpot Award in 2023
- Born: Raina Diane Telgemeier; May 26, 1977 (age 49) San Francisco, California, U.S.
- Notable works: Smile (2010); Drama (2012); Sisters (2014); Ghosts (2016); Guts (2019)
- Awards: Eisner: 2011 (Smile), 2015 (Sisters), 2017 (Ghosts), Dwayne McDuffie Award for Kids' Comics: 2017 (Ghosts), Inkpot Award: 2023
- Spouse: Dave Roman (m. 2006; div. 2015)

Raina Telgemeier (/ˈtɛlɡəˌmaɪər/; born May 26, 1977) is an American cartoonist. Her works include the autobiographical webcomic Smile, which was published as a full-color middle grade graphic novel in February 2010, and the follow-up Sisters and the fiction graphic novel Drama, all of which have been on The New York Times Best Seller lists. She has also written and illustrated the graphic novels Ghosts and Guts as well as four graphic novels adapted from The Baby-Sitters Club stories by Ann M. Martin.

== Early life ==
Raina Diane Telgemeier was born on May 26, 1977, in San Francisco, California, and grew up there. She has two younger siblings, Amara and Will. According to her memoir Smile, she knocked out two front teeth while in sixth grade and needed braces and multiple surgeries as a result. She attended Aptos Middle School and Lowell High School, both in San Francisco.

Telgemeier studied illustration at New York's School of Visual Arts; she graduated in 2002.

== Career ==
After graduating from the School of Visual Arts, Telgemeier began attending small-press festivals such as the MoCCA Festival, selling self-published autobiographical stories and vignettes from her life. She produced seven mini-comics issues in the Take-Out series between 2002 and 2005. Each was a twelve-page black-and-white comic. Other early works include a short story in Bizarro World for DC Comics and a short story in Volume 4 of the Flight anthology.

In 2004, Telgemeier joined Girlamatic, a subscription-based webcomics site dedicated to female writers. Telgemeier has said that the disciplined structure and schedule of publishing a weekly webcomic encouraged her to develop the autobiographical story Smile.

Her main breakthrough into published comics came from creating graphic novel adaptations of Baby-Sitters Club novels. In a piece for Cosmopolitan, Telgemeier said that she met an editor from Scholastic at an art gallery party in 2004 who mentioned that Scholastic was thinking of setting up a graphic novel imprint. At that year's San Diego Comic-Con, Telgemeier met that editor's boss, who invited her to pitch an idea for Scholastic. After Telgemeier mentioned she had been a fan of Ann M. Martin's The Baby-Sitters Club series, they asked her to work up a graphic novel adaptation. Scholastic, through its imprint Graphix, went on to publish four graphic novels in the series: Kristy's Great Idea, The Truth About Stacey, Mary Anne Saves the Day, and Claudia and Mean Janine. According to Telgemeier, the advances for the adaptations allowed Telgemeier to quit her full-time job and concentrate on her art, and she completed the fourth Baby-Sitters Club novel in 2008.

In 2009, Del Rey Manga released the graphic novel X-Men: Misfits, which Telgemeier co-wrote with her then-husband, Dave Roman. It spent at least five weeks on the New York Times bestseller list for Paperback Graphic Books.

In February 2010, Telgemeier released a print graphic novel version of her webcomic Smile. Smile first featured on a New York Times bestseller list in 2011 and as of October 2020 it is still on the New York Times Bestseller List for Graphic Books and Manga.

Telgemeier followed Smile with several original graphic novels, all of which have made a New York Times Bestseller List:

- Drama, released in 2012, about a middle school stage crew and performers, was released. Although the novel was fictional, it drew on experiences from Telgemeier's experience in middle school and high school theater.
- Sisters, released in 2014, about her life growing up with her younger sister.
- Ghosts, released in 2016, about a girl who can see ghosts, and adventures in a new town during Day of the Dead.
- Guts, released in 2019, about Telgemeier's stomach problems and her adventures in food, school, and changing friendships.

Telgemeier addresses a crowd during a book tour with Cece Bell, November 2025.

Telgemeier has continued to contribute to anthologies, including Nursery Rhyme Comics (2011, First Second), Fairy Tale Comics (2013, First Second); the Explorer graphic novel series (2012, 2013, Abrams/Amulet); and Comics Squad: Recess! (2014, Random House).

Of her work, Telgemeier said, "I'm more aware than ever of what I want to say to kids through my books [...] it's going to be O.K. That everybody, with just a little bit of talking and a little bit of empathy, can find out that they have a lot in common."

In 2021, Salt & Straw partnered with Scholastic Inc. and made a line of comics-themed ice creams. Telgemeier's ice cream flavor was called "Smile: Words & Pictures" which Salt & Straw said was "A pencil-inspired yellow and pink almond-infused sponge cake and Stracciatella ''pencil shavings'' are strewn about a notebook paper-esque canvas, in this case trusty vanilla ice cream."

In 2023, Telgemeier announced she had finished pencilling her next, untitled graphic novel, though would not be inking the pages as with previous books. Scholastic later announced the title, The Cartoonists Club, co-written with Scott McCloud, with a publication date of April 1, 2025.

== Reception ==
As of 2019, Telgemeier's books collectively have more than 18 million copies in print. According to David Saylor, publisher at Graphix, "Raina single-handedly created the market for middle-grade graphic memoir". Telgemeier's work has won several awards and nominations, including five Eisner Awards, and has been included on many lists of recommended books.

=== Awards ===
In 2023, Telgemeier was a recipient of the Inkpot Award at the annual San Diego Comic Con.

| Year | Nominated work | Category | Result | Refs. |
|---|---|---|---|---|
| 2003 | Take-Out | Lulu Awards – Kimberly Yale Award for Best New Talent | Won | |
| 2003 | Take-Out | Ignatz Awards – Promising New Talent | Nominated | |
| 2003 | Take-Out | Ignatz Awards – Outstanding Minicomic | Nominated | |
| 2005 | Smile (webcomic version) | Eisner Award – Talent Deserving of Wider Recognition | Nominated | |
| | Smile (webcomic version) | Web Cartoonists' Choice Award – Outstanding Slice-of-Life Webcomic | Nominated | |
| | Smile (webcomic version) | Web Cartoonists' Choice Award – Outstanding Slice-of-Life Webcomic | Nominated | |
| 2010 | Smile | Boston Globe-Horn Book Award – Nonfiction | Nominated | |
| 2011 | Smile | Eisner Award – Best Publication for Teens | Won | |
| 2011 | Smile | Children's Choice Book Awards – Fifth Grade to Sixth Grade Book of the Year | Nominated | |
| 2013 | Drama | Stonewall Book Award – Honor Books in Children's and Young Adult Literature | Won | |
| 2014 | Smile | Young Hoosier Book Award – Intermediate | Won | |
| 2015 | Sisters | Eisner Award – Best Writer/Artist | Won | |
| 2017 | Ghosts | Eisner Award – Best Publication for Kids (ages 9–12) | Won | |
| 2017 | Sisters | Young Hoosier Book Award – Intermediate | Won | |
| 2020 | Guts | Eisner Award – Best Publication for Kids | Won | |
| 2020 | Guts | Eisner Award – Best Writer/Artist | Won | |
| 2023 | | Inkpot Award | Won | |
| 2026 | The Cartoonist's Club (with Scott McCloud) | Eisner Award for Best Publication for Kids | Won | |

=== Recommendation lists and bestseller lists ===
| Year | Work | Organization | List | Notes |
|---|---|---|---|---|
| 2014 | Sisters | New York Times | Editor's Choice | |
| 2011 | Smile | Young Adult Library Services Association | 2011 Top Ten Great Graphic Novels for Teens | |
| 2011 | Smile | Association for Library Service to Children | 2011 Notable Children's Books (Middle Readers) | |
| 2010 | Smile | Kirkus Reviews | Best of 2010 for Teens | |
| 2007 | Baby Sitter's Club: Kristy's Great Idea | Young Adult Library Services Association | 2007 Great Graphic Novels for Teens | |

All five of her original graphic novels have made a The New York Times Best Seller list, as has at least one of her Baby-Sitters Club adaptations and X-Men: Misfits. On May 10, 2015, the top four books on The New York Times Best Seller list for paperback graphic books were all by Telgemeier: Drama, Smile, Sisters, and Kristy's Great Idea. Smile first featured on a New York Times bestseller list in 2011 and as of October 2020 it is still on the New York Times Bestseller List for Graphic Books and Manga.

In 2017, Telgemeier was named the "Most Important Comics Creator" by Comics Worth Reading, which cited her BookScan numbers, copies sold, and influence on the modern comics market as reasons why.

=== Challenges and bans ===
According to the ALA, Drama was among the top ten most challenged book in libraries and schools in 2014, 2016, 2017, 2018, and 2019. Reasons given for challenges and bans have included having LGBTQIA+ content and characters, sexually explicit content, an "offensive political viewpoint", being "confusing", and for concerns that it goes against "family values/morals".

According to the Wyoming State Library, one such challenge occurred in Laramie, Wyoming, famously the site of the homophobia-motivated killing of Matthew Shepard, in 2020, by a man who didn't like that his child had selected it in class. The 75 attendees at the public hearing largely spoke in favor of the book, and the challenge was dismissed by universal decision of the committee.

== Personal life ==
Telgemeier was married to fellow cartoonist Dave Roman; they married in 2006 but they filed for divorce in 2015.

She currently lives in San Francisco, California. She has lived in Astoria, New York.

== Published works ==
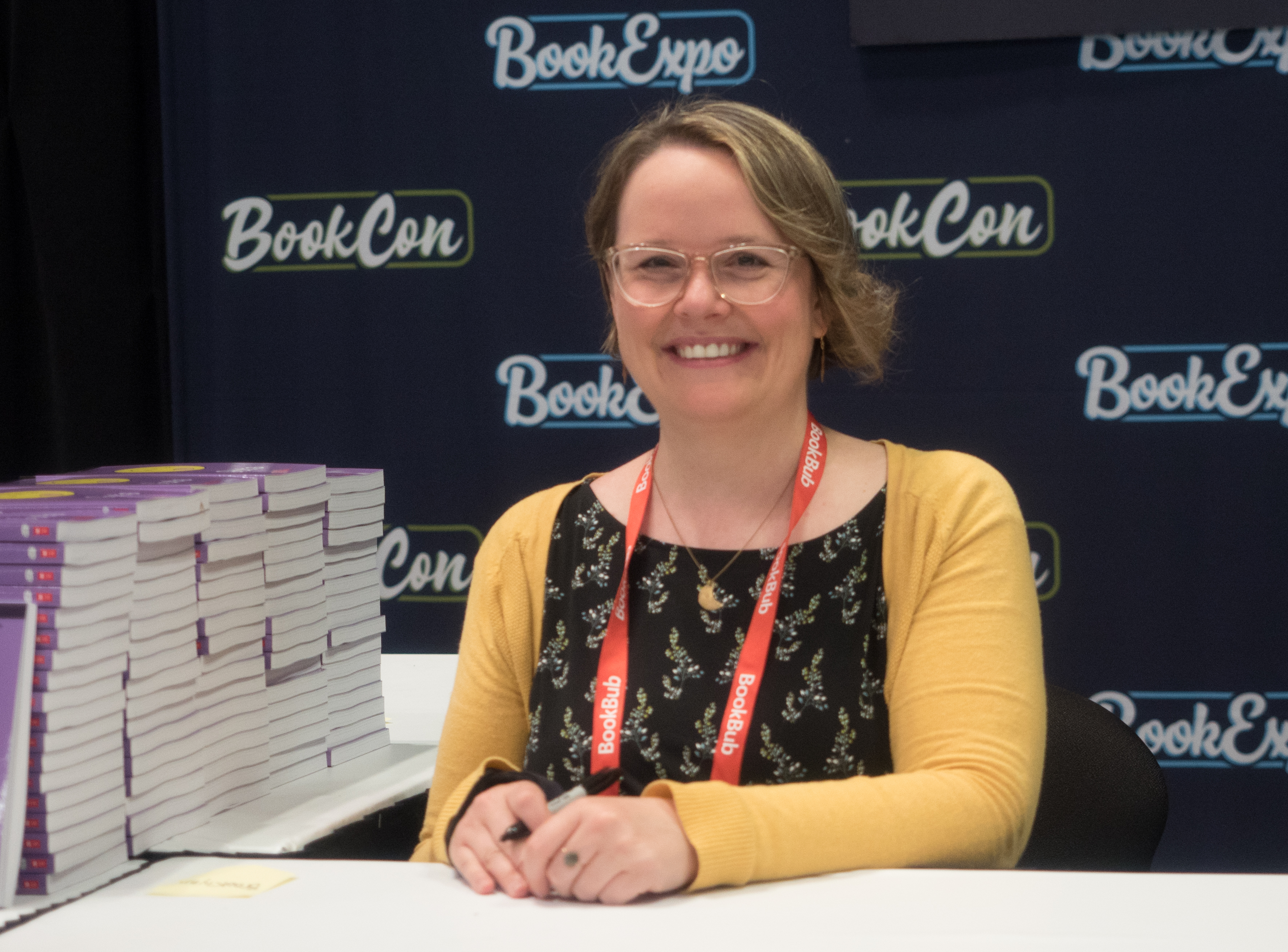
Raina Telgemeier at BookExpo at the Javits Center in New York City, May 2019

=== Author and illustrator ===
- Take-Out (self-published, 2002–2005)
- Smile (Scholastic/Graphix, 2010)
- Drama (Scholastic/Graphix, 2012)
- Sisters (Scholastic/Graphix, 2014)
- Ghosts (Scholastic/Graphix, 2016)
- Guts (Scholastic/Graphix, 2019)
- The Cartoonists Club (co-written with Scott McCloud) (Scholastic/Graphix, 2025)
- Facing Feelings: Inside the World of Raina Telgemeier (Scholastic/Graphix, 2025)

=== Illustrator ===
==== Babysitters Club graphic novels ====
- Kristy's Great Idea (2006)
- The Truth About Stacey (2006)
- Mary Anne Saves the Day (2007)
- Claudia and Mean Janine (2008)
- Baby-sitters on Board! (Note: In collaboration with Gale Galligan) (2026)

=== Author ===
- X-Men: Misfits (2009), co-authored with Dave Roman

=== Contributions to anthologies ===
- Bizarro World HC (DC Comics, 2005)
- Flight, Vol. 4 (2007)
- Nursery Rhyme Comics (First Second, 2011)
- Fairy Tale Comics (First Second, 2013)
- The Explorer graphic novel series (Abrams/Amulet, 2012, 2013)
- Comics Squad: Recess! (Random House, 2014)
