= Pedro Martín (author) =

Mexican American graphic artist and children's book author

- Education: San Jose State University
- Occupations: Graphic artist; Writer
- Writing career
- Notable work: Mexikid: A Graphic Memoir
- Website: pedromartinbooks.com www.pedromartinart-design.com

Pedro "Peter" Martín is a Mexican-American graphic artist, children's book author, and former-Hallmark artist.

The seventh of nine children, Martín was raised by Mexican parents in the Monterey Bay area. He graduated from San Jose State University, where he studied graphic design. After college, Martín worked as an illustrator at Hallmark, where he designed holiday cards; it was here that he later created the character Asteroid Andy, a young boy who meets various aliens after an alien elementary school lands near his house.

Martín is most well known for his graphic novel Mexikid: A Graphic Memoir, inspired by a childhood journey to Jalisco, Mexico in an RV with his parents and 8 siblings when he was 13. He developed the story into a webcomic first and then a graphic novel. The novel was well received by critics and received multiple awards. The sequel, Mexikid Dreams is scheduled for publication in September 2026.

== Awards and honors ==
Mexikid was regularly included on lists of the year's best books. In 2027, The New York Times and the Center for the Study of Multicultural Children's Literature named it one of the year's best children's books, while Brightly, Kirkus Reviews, and Publishers Weekly named it one of the year's best middle grade books. The Guardian named it one of the year's five best young adult books. Booklist, the New York Public Library, and School Library Journal named it among the year's best graphic novels. Chicago Public Library named it one of the Best Informational Books for Older Readers, and The Horn Book named it one of the year's best nonfiction children's books. NPR included it on their annual list of "Books We Love". The following year, Bank Street College of Education named Mexikid a book of "outstanding merit" for children ages 9-12. Booklist included the graphic novel on their lists of the top 10 graphic novels for teens, biographies and memoirs for youth, and middle-grade graphic novels. The Association for Library Service to Children named the book among their list of Notable Children's Books and the audiobook among their list tof Notable Children's Recordings.

Awards for Martín's work
Title	Year	Award	Result	Ref.
Mexikid	2024	Américas Award	Winner	
Mexikid	2024	Cybils Award for Elementary/Middle Grade Graphic Novel	Finalist	
Mexikid	2024	Eisner Award for Best Publication for Kids	Winner	
Mexikid	2024	Harvey Award for Best Children's Book	Winner	
Mexikid	2024	Heartland Booksellers Award for YA/Middle Grade	Winner	
Mexikid	2024	Newbery Medal	Honor	
Mexikid	2024	Odyssey Award	Honor	
Mexikid	2024	Pura Belpré Author Award	Winner	
Mexikid	2024	Pura Belpré Youth Illustrator Award	Winner	
Mexikid	2024	Tomás Rivera Award	Winner	

== Publications ==
=== As author ===
- MexiKid: A Graphic Memoir. Dial Books. 2023. ISBN 978-0-593-46228-7.
  - Mexikid: En Español. Vintage Español. 2023. ISBN 978-1-644-73935-8.
- Mexkid Dreams: A Graphic Memoir. Dial Books. 2026. ISBN 979-8217-00248-1.

=== As illustrator ===
- Davis, Kenneth C. (2002). Don't Know Much about the Presidents. HarperCollins. ISBN 978-0-06-028615-6.
- Levine, Deborah A. (2002). Parker Picks. Simon & Schuster. ISBN 978-0-689-83456-1.
