= Guts (graphic novel) =

2019 graphic novel by Raina Telgemeier

- Guts cover
- Author: Raina Telgemeier
- Language: English
- Series: Smile
- Release number: 3
- Genre: Autobiography, Graphic novel, Nonfiction
- Publisher: Scholastic
- Publication date: September 10, 2019
- Publication place: United States
- Pages: 224
- ISBN: 978-0545852500
- Preceded by: Sisters

Guts is a 2019 American graphic novel written and illustrated by Raina Telgemeier and colored by Braden Lamb. The book received positive reviews from critics, who praised Telgemeier's normalization of mental health problems. The book also received two Eisner Awards.

== Background ==
As with the 2 other books in the Smile series, Guts is an autobiographical novel detailing events of Telgemeier's life. In an interview with Reading Rockets, Telgemeier explains that originally, she did not want to write about her belly problems as she thought it would be too "gross" and "disgusting". However, she later realized that the more open she was, "the better". Guts was written and illustrated in about 2 years.

== Reception ==
Guts received positive reception. Scott Stossel from The New York Times said "'Guts' is dedicated to 'anyone who feels afraid.' For anyone that includes, this book’s warmth, humanity and humor provides a balm more soul-soothing than any pill." Karen Jensen from Teen Librarian Toolbox said "Far too many of our young people are wrestling with mental health issues and we need to do better for them. Guts is just one of the ways that we can help. And that’s the power of story." Kirkus Reviews said: "With young readers diagnosed with anxiety in ever increasing numbers, this book offers a necessary mirror to many."

=== Awards ===
Year	Awards	Category	Result	Recipient	Notes
2020	Eisner Award	Best Publication for Kids	Won	Guts	
2020	Eisner Award	Best Writer/Artist	Won	Raina Telgemeier, Guts	
2020	Ringo Award	Best Kids Comic or Graphic Novel	Won	Guts	
