= Vera Brosgol =

Canadian cartoonist

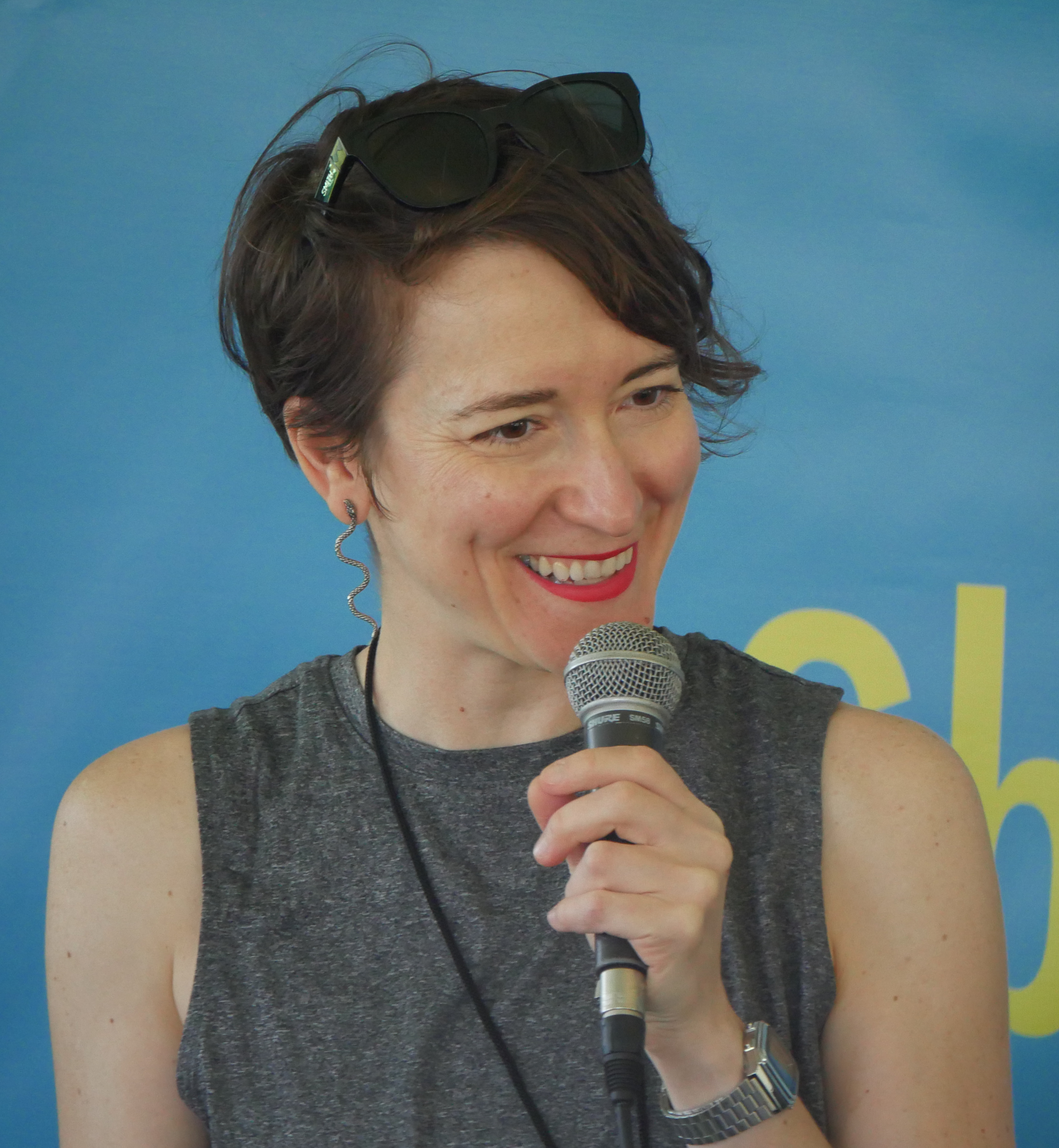
- Born: August 2, 1984 (age 42); Moscow, Russian SFSR, Soviet Union
- Citizenship: United States; Canada
- Education: Sheridan College
- Occupations: Cartoonist, storyboard artist, comics writer
- Writing career
- Pen name: Verabee
- Period: 2010–present

Vera Brosgol (Russian: Вера Бросгол; born August 2, 1984), also known by her pseudonym Verabee, is an American and Canadian cartoonist and storyboard artist.

== Life and career ==
Brosgol was born in Moscow but moved to the United States when she was five, and was raised in upstate New York and Canada. She graduated with a diploma in Classical Animation from Sheridan College, then worked at Laika Entertainment in Portland, where she did storyboards and concept art for their animation productions, including Coraline, ParaNorman, The Boxtrolls, Missing Link, and Kubo and the Two Strings. She was Head of Story for Guillermo del Toro's Pinocchio (2022), and also was storyboard artist and writer for one episode of both Bee and Puppy Cat, and We Bare Bears. Brosgol collaborated with Shaenon Garrity on L'il Mell and Sergio for Girlamatic and has drawn several guest comics for John Allison's Scary Go Round. She currently lives in Portland, Oregon, and has transitioned to writing books full-time, having published her first graphic novel, Anya's Ghost in 2011, and her first picture book, Leave Me Alone in 2016.

== Personal life ==
Brosgol enjoys hiking, riding her bike, and baking.

== Art style ==
Brosgol uses brush and ink and prefers simple drawings for effective communication She has been majorly influenced by Rumiko Takahashi, especially Ranma 1/2, and liked the "dirty and funny and energetic" vibe after getting into manga in her teen years, in addition to Calvin & Hobbes, which she "inhaled" as a kid.

== Awards ==
- 2005 Kimberly Yale Award for Best New Talent for her work on Flight and Hopeless Savages B-Sides
- 2005 Nelvana "Best Film" Prize for Snow-Bo
- 2006 Best Animated Film by a NW Filmmaker for Snow-Bo (Film Society of Portland)
- 2007 Darkly Award for Snow-Bo (Channel Frederator Podcast)
- 2012 Eisner Award for Best Publication for Young Adults (ages 12–17) for Anya's Ghost
- 2012 Harvey Award for Best Original Graphic Publication for Younger Readers for Anya's Ghost
- 2016 Caldecott Honor for Leave Me Alone!
- 2025 Eisner Award for Best Publication for Kids for Plain Jane and the Mermaid

== Bibliography ==
- 2002: "Babeland" (part of Mostly Acquisitions)
- 2003: Wary Tales Anthology
- 2002–2004: Return to Sender (discontinued)
- 2004: "I Wish..." (part of Flight Volume One)
- 2005: "Salmoning" (part of Flight Volume Two)
- 2005: Hopeless Savages: B-sides: The Origin of the Dusted Bunnies (as co-illustrator)
- 2007: "Little Trouble at the Big Top" (part of Flight Volume Four)
- 2011: Anya's Ghost
- 2015: "Olive's Story" (part of Gotham Academy: Endgame special)
- 2016: Leave Me Alone!
- 2018: Be Prepared
- 2019: The Little Guys
- 2021: Memory Jars
- 2022: A Spoonful of Frogs
- 2024: Plain Jane and the Mermaid

== Filmography ==
- 2005: Snow-Bo (animation)
- 2005: Someone Is Going to Die (animation)
- 2009: Coraline (storyboard artist)
- 2012: ParaNorman (story artist)
- 2014: The Boxtrolls (additional writing)
- 2015: We Bare Bears (writer/storyboard artist: "Pet Shop")
- 2016: Bee and PuppyCat (storyboard artist)
- 2022: Guillermo del Toro's Pinocchio (head of story)
