= Mexikid: A Graphic Memoir =

2023 graphic novel by Pedro Martín

- Author: Pedro Martín
- Audio read by: Oscar Emmanuel Fabela and others
- Illustrator: Pedro Martín
- Language: English / Spanish
- Genre: Children's literature / graphic novel
- Publisher: Dial Books
- Publication date: August 1, 2023
- Publication place: United States
- ISBN: 978-0-593-46228-7
- Followed by: Mexikid Dreams

Mexikid: A Graphic Memoir is a 2023 children's graphic novel written and illustrated by Mexican American author and graphic artist Pedro Martín. It is a fictionalized account of Pedro and his family's journey to Mexico to bring their grandfather back to live with them in California.

The Mexikid audiobook is narrated by Oscar Emmanuel Fabela, Omar Leyva, Cynthia Farrell, Kevin Orduño, Elena Rey, Avi Roque, Christophe Landa, Daisy Guevara, Alejandro Vargas-Lugo, and Fernando Monroy.

== Plot summary ==
Pedro and his family, father Apá and mother Amá, brothers Salvador, León, Noé, Hugo, Alejandro, Adán, and sisters Liduina and Ruth, live in Watsonville, California, where they work as farmworkers after the family emigrated from Mexico. Pedro's parents have finally convinced Pedro's elderly grandfather, Abuelito, whom he has never met, to live with them in the United States. Pedro's father explains that his grandfather ran supplies between the opposing sides of the Mexican Revolution; Pedro begins to imagine his grandfather as something approaching the superheroes in his comics.

Pedro, Hugo, Adán, and Alejandro travel with their parents in an RV while the oldest children, Sal, Lila, León, Noé, and Ruth, travel in Apá's pickup behind them. In Los Angeles, the family stops for the night at Adán's godparents, and the children play store with the toys and clothes Adán's godparents have collected to donate in Mexico, drawing price tags on everything.

The next morning, Apá loads the RV with the donations, and the family departs for the border. Border federales notice the children's drawn-on prices and search the RV for contraband. The federales try to extort the family for $200, but Apá convinces the guards to take the clothes, toys, and $20 to let them pass. The older children pass through customs without incident.

In Apá and Amá's hometown of Pegueros, one of their cousins brings the children to the local barber, who tells the children about Abeulito's history in the Cristero War, running a mule train between Pegueros and Tepatitlán.

The family leaves the next morning for Abuelito's ranch. The younger children are impressed by the old man's strength while lifting sheafs into the back of the truck. To impress them further, León tells the story of Abuelito being robbed by bandits: while on a supply run from Tepatitlán, Abuelito was attacked by two men; after a fistfight, the two robbers tried to steal Abuelito's mule and flee; Abuelito used a slingshot to rip a bag of flour carried by the mule, disorienting the men and giving him time to hide; suspicious of Abuelito's sudden disappearance, the men fled.

The older children ask if they can return to California, take the pickup truck, and leave. Apá drives the younger children into Tepatitlán, where they collect a child-sized coffin. He tells them a river has started flowing into the graveyard where his mother is buried, and they need to move her body before Abuelito comes with them.

Visiting the graveyard, the caretaker leads them to the grave, explaining their abuelita's grave is likely below two others; Apá, Abuelito, and the caretaker start digging. They reach her coffin and begin removing her remains from the grave. After collecting her scapular, Amá says a prayer over the remains, and they are transferred to the coffin and finally laid to rest in a mausoleum.

Pedro's aunt throws a party for Abuelito, and the whole family heads back to Pegueros. They stop at the abuelita's mausoleum to pay one last respect, and Abuelito sells his ranch animals to the cemetery caretaker. The family begins their journey back to the U.S., with Apá deciding to travel north through Baja.

Pedro and Abuelito start to bond on the drive home after Pedro asks him about his experiences driving a mule train, and the two take turns drawing in Pedro's sketchbook. In Puerto Vallarte, Pedro is scammed out of all his money after another child sells him dud fireworks, so he tries to get Abuelito to beat the boy up; Abuelito tells him money is not worth dying for. That night, the boys sleep on the roof of the RV and see a fireworks show from the beach.

They cross the Sea of Cortez by ferry to Cabo San Lucas; Apá tries to teach Pedro to drive in the sparse desert landscape, hitting every bump in the road. During a traffic jam, Pedro asks Abuelito if he was ever in a gunfight; Abuelito instead draws Apá with a slingshot in Pedro's sketchbook, and Pedro is enamored, asking Apá if he can buy a slingshot himself.

The family passes through the border without incident and stops again at Adán's godparents' house. Nearing home, they witness a deer get hit by a car. Apá rushes out and has the children and Abuelito help him carry the deer back to the RV, shoving it in the shower, thinking it is dead. The deer regains consciousness, and Pedro tries to put it out of its misery but finds himself unable to do so; the deer dies on its own soon after.

Using meat from the deer, Pedro and his family have a birria party to welcome Abeulito to his new home. Abeulito tells the story of Pedro and the deer, and toasts Pedro.

== Characters ==
- Pedro: A 13-year-old boy whose life revolves around Star Wars, comic books, and superheroes
- Apá: Pedro's father
- Amá: Pedro's mother; speaks entirely in Spanish
- Salvador "Chava": Pedro's eldest brother
- Liduina "Lila": Pedro's eldest sister and closest friend in the family
- León: Pedro's brother; best friends with Noé
- Noé: Pedro's brother; best friends with León
- Ruth: Pedro's youngest sister
- Hugo: Pedro's brother
- Adán: Pedro's brother
- Alejandro: Pedro's youngest brother
- Alejandro "Abeulito": Pedro's grandfather

== Reception ==
Both the English and Spanish editions of Mexikid are Junior Library Guild books. The novel was well received by critics, including starred reviews from Booklist, The Horn Book Magazine, Kirkus Reviews, Publishers Weekly, and School Library Journal. The Horn Book Magazine said the memoir was "a heartfelt exploration of culture and identity".

The book was regularly included on lists of the year's best books. In 2023, The New York Times and the Center for the Study of Multicultural Children's Literature named it one of the year's best children's books, while Brightly, Kirkus Reviews, and Publishers Weekly named it one of the year's best middle grade books. The Guardian named it one of the year's five best young adult books. Booklist, the New York Public Library, and School Library Journal named it among the year's best graphic novels. Chicago Public Library named it one of the Best Informational Books for Older Readers, and The Horn Book named it one of the year's best nonfiction children's books. NPR included it on their annual list of "Books We Love". The following year, Bank Street College of Education named Mexikid a book of "outstanding merit" for children ages 9-12. Booklist included the graphic novel on their lists of the top 10 graphic novels for teens, biographies and memoirs for youth, and middle-grade graphic novels. The Association for Library Service to Children named the book among their list of Notable Children's Books and the audiobook among their list tof Notable Children's Recordings.

Awards for Mexikid
Year	Award	Result	Ref.
2024	Américas Award	Winner	
2024	Cybils Award for Elementary/Middle Grade Graphic Novel	Finalist	
2024	Eisner Award for Best Publication for Kids	Winner	
2024	Harvey Award for Best Children’s Book	Winner	
2024	Heartland Booksellers Award for YA/Middle Grade	Winner	
2024	Newbery Medal	Honor	
2024	Odyssey Award	Honor	
2024	Pura Belpré Author Award	Winner	
2024	Pura Belpré Youth Illustrator Award	Winner	
2024	Tomás Rivera Award	Winner	

== Sequel ==
Mexikid Dreams was published in September 2026.
