= Grecia Rojas Ortiz =

Peruvian lawyer and politician

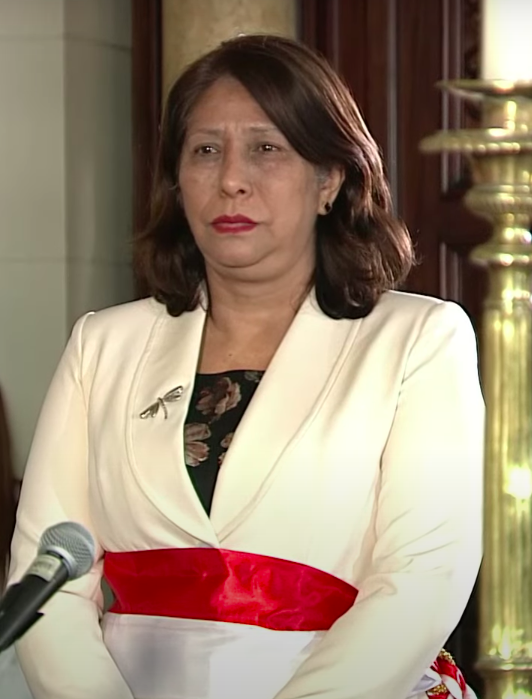
Grecia Rojas in 2022

Grecia Elena Rojas Ortiz is a Peruvian lawyer and politician. She served as Minister of Women and Vulnerable Populations in the government of Dina Boluarte December 2022 to January 2023. She is a graduate of the University of San Martín de Porres.
