= Vincenzo Balzano =

Italian magistrate

Vincenzo Eugenio Balzano (Castel di Sangro, 18 July 1866 – Rome, 29 November 1951) was an Italian magistrate, an art historian and a scholar of the history of Abruzzo and Molise.

== Biography ==
Graduated in Law in Bologna, in 1922 he joined the Supreme Military Tribunal, with the rank of major general and in 1926 he was appointed to the Tribunale speciale per la difesa dello Stato (1926-1943). For having carried out this function, at the fall of fascism he was arrested and put on trial. After serving 22 months in prison, he was freed, along with other former attorneys of the Tribunale speciale per la difesa dello Stato, following the Togliatti amnesty declared on 22 June 1946.

Balzano dedicated himself very much to study of the history of Abruzzo and Molise. Together with Antonio De Nino, he was among the promoters of a museum that collected all the archaeological finds found in the territory of the ancient city of Aufidena.

== Works ==
In 1954, Balzano's books, manuscripts and correspondence were donated by his family to the municipal library of Castel di Sangro, named after him, where they are still preserved today.

Many works are devoted to the history of Abruzzo and Molise

- La storia di Castel di Sangro raccontata a scuola, Bologna, Tip. Mareggiani, 1889;
- I legisti ed artisti abruzzesi lettori nello studio di Bologna, con lettera-prefazione del prof. Enrico Casti, Castel di Sangro, tip. O. Putaturo, 1892;
- Dove fu Aufidena, Castel di Sangro, Tip. Ed. Oriente Putaturo, 1899;
- Relazione del congresso storico abruzzese adunato in Chieti in settembre 1905 pel segretario Avv. Vincenzo Balzano, Aquila, Tipografia Aternina, 1905, estratto dal Giornale Abruzzese di Chieti, a. 1., n. 24, 21 sett. 1905;
- Appunti intorno alla scuola d'oreficeria aquilana, Teramo, Rivista Abruzzese, 1906, estratto dalla Rivista Abruzzese di Scienze, Lettere ed Arti, Anno 21.-Fasc. 12;
- Antonio De Nino, Teramo, Rivista Abruzzese, 1907, estratto dalla Rivista Abruzzese di scienze, lettere ed arti, anno 22. fasc. 4;
- Concezio Rosa e le sue opere, Teramo, G. Fabbri, 1909;
- Scultori e sculture abruzzesi del sec. XV, Roma, Tipografia dell'Unione Editrice, 1909, estratto da: L'Arte di Adolfo Venturi, anno 12., fasc. 3;
- Concezio Rosa, Studi di preistoria e di storia. Raccolta completa curata dall'avv. Vincenzo Balzano, con prefazione e note del medesimo, Teramo, G. Fabbri, 1909-1912;
- L'arte abruzzese, Bergamo, Istituto Italiano d'arti grafiche, 1910;
- Per il programma della Rassegna, (lettere), a cura di Ignazio Carlo Gavini e Vincenzo Balzano, Roma, Tipografia nazionale di G. Bertero & C., 1913, estratto da: "Rassegna d'Arte degli Abruzzi e del Molise", anno 2., marzo 1913;
- Elenco degli edifici monumentali, XLIV. Provincia di teramo (Ministero della pubblica istruzione), Roma, Tip. Unione Ed., 1916;
- Aufidena Caracenorum, ai confini settentrionali del Sannio, memorie storiche intorno all'antichita di Castel di Sangro, Roma, Arti graf. e fotomeccaniche P.Sansaini, 1923
- Abruzzo e Molise, Torino, UTET, 1927;
- La vita di un comune del reame, Castel di Sangro, Roma, tip. Arte della Stampa, 1942

== Sources ==
- Mario Balzano, Vincenzo Balzano, l'unico gentiluomo del tribunale speciale, Castel di Sangro, Biblioteca Comunale Vincenzo Balzano, 1989.
- Ezio Mattiocco, Antonio De Nino e Vincenzo Balzano, protagonisti della ricerca archeologica nel Sannio settentrionale, Lanciano, Itinerari, stampa 2001.
- Ezio Mattiocco, Vincenzo Balzano e i suoi scritti, L'Aquila, Libreria Colacchi, 2001.
- Ezio Mattiocco, Balzano Vincenzo, in Gente d'Abruzzo. Dizionario biografico, a cura di Enrico Di Carlo, Castelli, Andromeda editrice, 2006, vol. I, pp. 239–242.
- Ezio Mattiocco, Il Museo Aufidenate nel Convento della Maddalena in Castel di Sangro, 2005, Synapsi edizioni.
