= Claudia Dávila =

Peruvian lawyer and politician

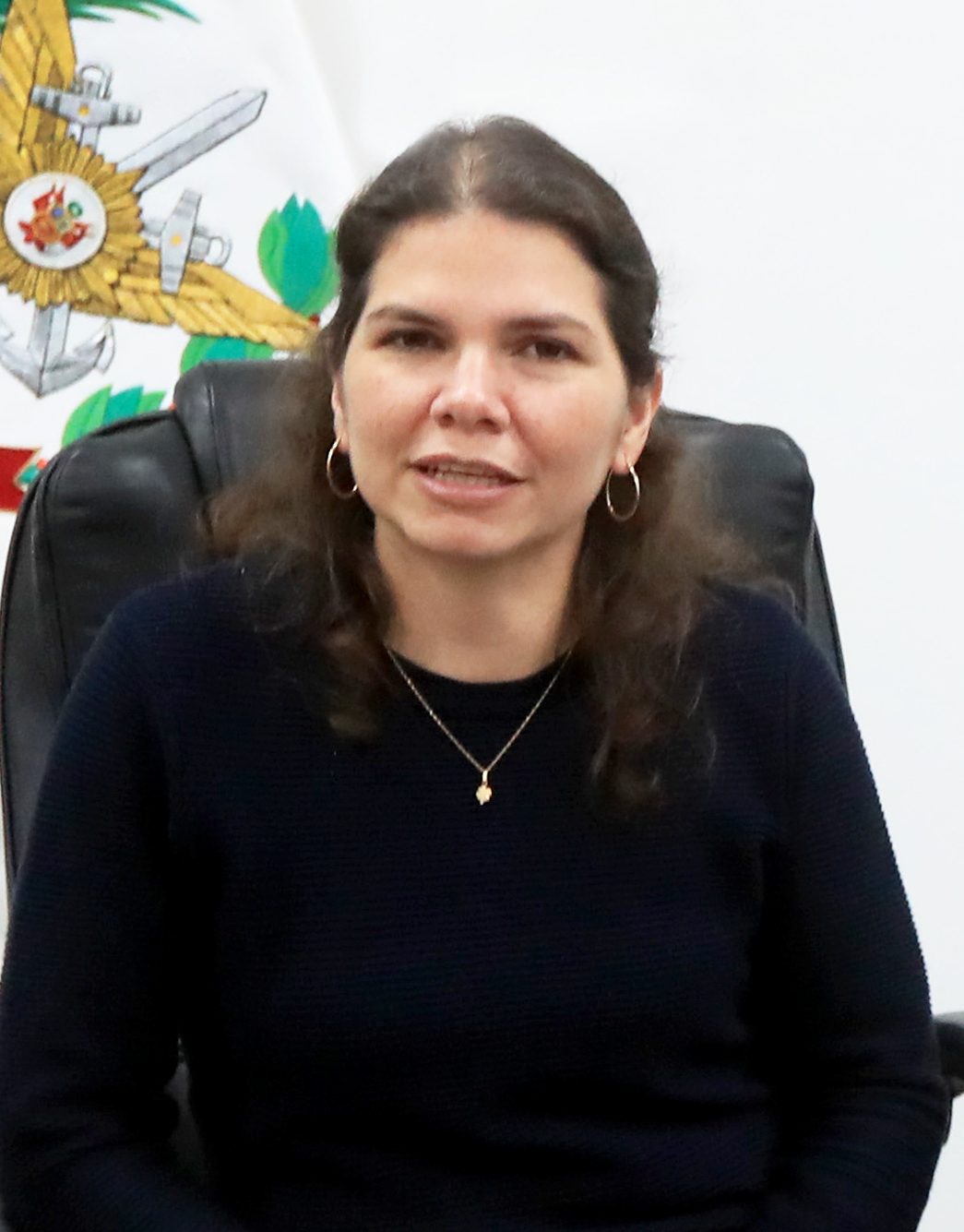
- Dávila in November 2022
- Occupations: Lawyer and politician

Claudia Dávila Moscoso is a Peruvian lawyer and politician. She was Minister of Women and Vulnerable Populations in the administration of Pedro Castillo from August until November 2022, succeeding Diana Miloslavich. She was replaced by Heidy Juárez Calle.
