= Smile (comic book) =

Graphic novel written by Raina Telgemeier

- Smile cover
- Author: Raina Telgemeier
- Genre: Autobiography; Graphic novel; nonfiction
- Publisher: Scholastic/Graphix
- Publication date: February 1, 2010
- Media type: Print (Hardcover and Paperback)
- Pages: 213
- Awards: Eisner Award, 2011
- ISBN: 0-545-13206-1
- OCLC: 289095899
- LC Class: RK55.Y68 T45 2010
- Followed by: Sisters
- Website: goraina.com/smile

Smile is an autobiographical graphic novel written by Raina Telgemeier. It was published in February 2010 by Graphix, an imprint of Scholastic Inc. The novel provides an account of the author's life, characterized by dental procedures and struggles with fitting in, from sixth grade to high school. The book originated as a webcomic, which was serialized on Girlamatic. It is most appropriate for readers between fourth and sixth grade. Smile has had a pedagogical impact, and reviews have been written on this novel.

== Background ==
Smile was initially published as a webcomic on Girlamatic, an online magazine website. One strip of Telgemeier’s comic was published online each week. Telgemeier created this comic to tell the story of her adolescence, though she did not initially write these strips for Girlamatic with children in mind as her intended audience.

Smile was published as a graphic novel with eight chapters by the Graphix imprint of Scholastic Inc. in 2010. Stephanie Yue did the color for the novel version of Smile.

== Summary ==
=== Character list ===
- Raina - A young teenager (11 at the beginning, 15 at the end) who has an accident that leaves her with dental trauma. Raina is the character based on author Raina Telgemeier’s teen self.
- Dr. Dragoni - Raina’s orthodontist.
- Mom (Sue) - Raina, Amara, and Will's levelheaded mother, wife of Denis.
- Amara - A six-year-old (a 10-year-old at the end). She teased Raina for her braces and is her younger sister, the middle Telgemeier child
- Will - Raina and Amara’s younger brother (3 at the beginning, 7 at the end)
- Kelli - The friend that was with Raina when she injured her teeth.
- Dad (Denis) - Raina, Will, and Amara's father, Sue's husband.
- Dr. Golden - Raina’s dentist.
- Melissa, Emily, Kaylah, Jenny - Four of Raina’s friends from middle school.
- Nicole and Karin - Two of Raina’s friends from middle school who later harassed her.
- Sammy - The boy in Raina’s band class that Raina has a crush on as she begins seventh grade.
- Sean - The boy in Raina’s art class that Raina has a crush on for most of middle school.
- Theresa - The first new friend Raina makes after breaking up with Nicole and Karin.

== Genre and style ==
Smile is a graphic novel based on Telgemeier's experience. This novel is recommended for children who are in fourth grade or above.

This graphic novel has a cartoon-like style that is typical of and unique to author Raina Telgemeier. Professor Michelle Ann Abate notes that, as can be seen in the text of many graphic novels, Smile utilizes nonstandard capitalization and mixed-case lettering. Telgemeier’s style also involves altering the size and shape of the panels of her graphic novel to create dramatic effects.

Although the graphic novel form may provide more opportunities for levity than the traditional novel structure, Smile shows that this literary style can be used to convey serious and emotional events in a compelling manner.

== Analysis ==
The use of Smile in pedagogical settings has been debated.

=== Pedagogical advantages of using Smile ===
Scholars hold that graphic novels, and Smile in particular, can pique the interests of students who do not enjoy reading traditional literature. Writer Jess Bradley cites Smile as a graphic novel that contributed to the increasing popularity of graphic novels around 2010 and a book that continues to attract a large number of readers. A study conducted by Professor William Boerman-Cornell in 2016 upholds the pedagogical value of Smile, as it includes this novel in a list of recommended graphic fiction for middle grade readers. Educational researcher Elizabeth Friese holds that Smile is a graphic novel that provides children with an example of a nontraditional way to share one's life story. Additionally, Friese notes that Telgemeier’s inner voice comes through sharply in this novel in a way that may help students understand their own experiences of consciousness. Professor Laura Jiménez and her colleagues argue that graphic novels like Smile help children learn to integrate source types and engage in the process of meaning-making while reading texts of all forms.

Elementary school teacher Caryn Wilkinson provides an example of a way that Smile can be used as a scaffolding text in classroom settings. After engaging with one section of Telgemeier’s text, Wilkinson's students were able to make detailed observations about the text when they were not looking at the page and demonstrate their understanding of the scene in a more coherent way than Wilkinson had seen them explain scenes from traditional pedagogical literature.

=== Pedagogical disadvantages of using Smile ===
While scholars considering the way literature is taught may believe that graphic novels like Smile provide unique opportunities for children who do not love to read to explore a new type of storytelling, Professor Michelle Ann Abate holds that graphic novels like Smile often include typographic features such as irregular capitalization that are more difficult for children who struggle with literacy to process. Additionally, Professors Wendy Smith-D’Arezzo and Janine Holc note that Smile fails to represent people with marginalized identities in roles that are central to the plot of the novel. They criticize Smile for centering a white, middle-class family that interacts mostly with people who share their background.

== Reception ==
The book received positive reviews. The New York Times described it as "a story to comfort readers traversing the years between childhood and adulthood," and named it an "Editors' Choice." Kirkus Reviews called it "irresistible, funny and touching" with "strong writing and emotionally expressive characters", later designating it one of the best 2010 nonfiction books for teens. According to School Library Journal, it is an "excellent addition to middle school literature." It was included as one of four "Great Graphic Novels for Family Entertainment" in a 2010 article in The Christian Science Monitor. Smile is included on the list of 2011 Books for Young Adolescents published by Voices from the Middle that focuses on novels featuring authentic youthful voices written for middle grade children.

In a 2010 interview with librarian Snow Wildsmith of Good Comics for Kids, Telgemeier said that the first print run of the book sold out in four months. Telgemeier also noted that she believes children are attracted to the cover of Smile, then are pleased to find out it is a “comic book”. Telgemeier said that she hears that “kids are insane for it”.

As of February 25, 2017 the paperback version of this novel had spent 240 weeks on The New York Times Best Sellers list under the category "Paperback Graphic Books." Smile was last featured on The New York Times Bestseller list for Graphic Books and Manga in February 2021.

The impact of Smile can be seen in the way that it has been incorporated into other works. In 2014, Mark Tatulli wrote Smile into his daily comic strip Heart of the City, as heroine Heart Lamarr discovers the graphic novel on a trip to the library with her mother.

=== Awards ===
Smile won the 2010 Boston Globe - Horn Book Honor for Nonfiction. In 2011, the novel won the Eisner Award for Best Publication for Teens. It was also one of Young Adult Library Services Association's 2011 Top Ten Great Graphic Novels for Teens and a 2011 Association for Library Service to Children Notable Children's Book for Middle Readers. In 2013, it won the Intermediate Young Reader's Choice Award from Washington and the 2013 Rebecca Caudill Young Reader's Book Award from Illinois. Smile also won the 2014 Nevada Young Reader Award.
