= Saadia Faruqi =

American author

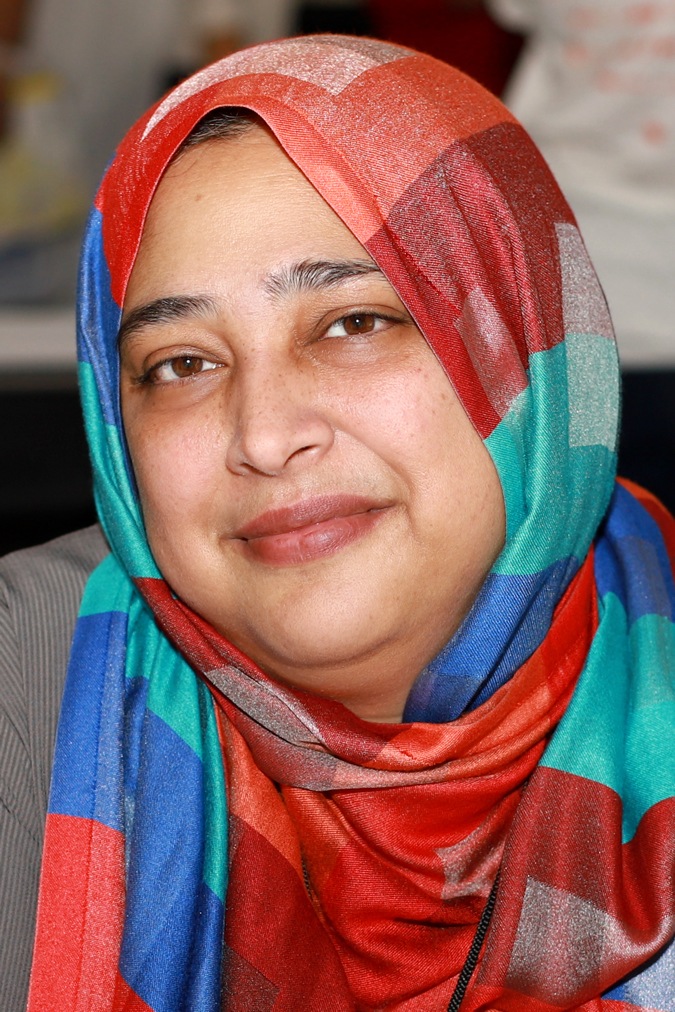
- Faruqi at the 2022 Texas Book Festival.
- Education: University of Central Florida; Baker University
- Occupation: Author
- Website: saadiafaruqi.com

Saadia Faruqi is a Pakistani-American author.

== Biography ==
Originally from Karachi, Pakistan, Faruqi moved to the United States in 1998. She completed her bachelor's degree in business administration from the University of Central Florida and her master's degree in liberal arts from Baker University in Kansas. After 9/11 and while she still worked as a grant writer, Faruqi began writing about Islam for a local newspaper in Houston, Texas as a way to combat Muslim stereotypes. After this work, she led educational discussions and training sessions about Islam at different institutions, including churches, synagogues, schools and police departments.

Several years after 9/11, frustrated by the lack of understanding and acceptance she saw in the west regarding Muslims, Faruqi began her fiction career. Her debut book was a collection of short stories about life in Pakistan, titled Brick Walls: Tales of Hope & Courage From Pakistan. The book was released in 2015. Her first children's book, Meet Yasmin! was released in 2018 and focuses on the adventures of a seven-year-old Pakistani-American girl. The book is part of a series of books with the character Yasmin, illustrated by Hatem Aly. At the end of each book, a glossary of Urdu words, facts about Pakistan, and related activities are included. The Yasmin series has won numerous accolades, including Parents Magazine's Best Summer Reading Books for Kids 2019 and NPR's Best Children's Books of 2020.

On August 11, 2020, the middle grade novel A Place at the Table was published, co-written by Faruqi and Laura Shovan. The book is about two 11-year-olds—Pakistani-American Sara and Elizabeth, who is Jewish—who develop a friendship after becoming cooking partners in class. Faruqi and Shovan embarked on this project as a way to address the dichotomy that arises in immigrant families between parents and grandparents born in the home country versus first generation children born in the adopted country. Food is an important theme in this novel, as a way to connect cultures, traditions and families. In 2021, A Place at the Table won the South Asia Book award highly commended title.

On October 6, 2020, Faruqi published her first solo middle grade novel A Thousand Questions about eleven-year-old Pakistani American girl Mimi who visits Pakistan during summer vacation to meet her grandparents. There, she meets servant girl Sakina, and they form an unlikely friendship across class lines. A Thousand Questions won honor at the 2021 South Asia Book Awards and was a Washington Post KidsPost book club pick for summer 2021. Further, it was a Best Children's Books of 2021 by Bank Street College of Education, and A Mighty Girl 2020 Book of the Year.

On September 7, 2021, Faruqi released Yusuf Azeem Is Not A Hero, a middle grade novel highlighting the attacks of 9/11. This book focuses solely on the experiences of the Muslim American community during and after 9/11, a perspective she felt was missing from other children's books about the attacks. This book highlights Islamophobia, racism, white supremacy and a host of other themes through the eyes of twelve-year-old Yusuf, whose small Texas town is commemorating the twentieth anniversary of the attacks. Included in the novel are journal entries by Yusuf's uncle Rahman, who was a young boy in 2001. Yusuf Azeem was one of School Library Journal's Best Middle Grade Novels in 2021.

Faruqi has also written nonfiction books for young readers, aimed at removing stereotypes of Muslims and presenting accurate information about their achievements. Included are Eid-al-Fitr Mad Libs, and The Wonders We Seek: Thirty Incredible Muslims Who Helped Shape The World, co-written with her mother Aneesa Mumtaz.

== Publications ==
=== Standalone books ===
- Brick Walls: Tales of Hope & Courage from Pakistan (2015, ISBN 978-0-9903-8766-4)
- A Place at the Table (2020, Clarion Books, ISBN 978-0-3581-1668-4)
- A Thousand Questions (2020, Quill Tree Books, ISBN 978-0-0629-4320-0)
- Yusuf Azeem Is Not a Hero (2021, Quill Tree Books, ISBN 978-0-0629-4325-5)
- The Wonders We Seek: Thirty Incredible Muslims Who Helped Shape the World with Aneesa Mumtaz, illustrated by Saffa Khan (2022, Quill Tree Books, ISBN 978-0-0629-7344-3)
- Rani's Remarkable Day, illustrated by Anoosha Syed (2023, Clarion Books, ISBN 978-0-3585-3677-2)
- Saving Sunshine, illustrated by Shazleen Khan (2023, First Second Books)

=== Ali the Great series ===
The Ali the Great series is illustrated by Debby Rahmalia.

- Ali the Great and the Paper Airplane Flop (2023, Picture Window Books, ISBN 978-1-4846-8131-2)
- Ali the Great and the Market Mishap (2023, Picture Window Books, ISBN 978-1-4846-8113-8)
- Ali the Great and the Eid Surprise Party (2023, Picture Window Books, ISBN 978-1-6663-9389-7)
- Ali the Great and the Dinosaur Mistake (2023, Picture Window Books, ISBN 978-1-6663-9388-0)

=== Marya Khan series ===
The Marya Khan series is a chapter book series about a spunky eight year old Marya and her Pakistani American family. Other prominent characters include her arch-enemy Alexa, her best friend Hanna, and her third grade teacher Ms. Piccolo. This series is perfect for grades 3-4. It is illustrated by Ani Bushry.

1. Marya Khan and the Incredible Henna Party (2022, Harry N. Abrams, ISBN 978-1-4197-6116-4)
2. Marya Khan and the Fabulous Jasmine Garden (2023, Amulet Books, ISBN 978-1-4197-6118-8)
3. Marya Khan and the Spectacular Fall Festival (2023, Amulet Books, ISBN 978-1-4197-6120-1)
4. Marya Khan and the Awesome Adventure Park (2023, Amulet Books, ISBN to come)

=== Must Love Pets series ===
The Must Love Pets series is a lower middle grade series about a Pakistani American girl named Imaan who starts a petsitting business with her friends London and Olivia in order to convince her mother to let her keep a dog of her own. Each book in the series is about a different pet sitting client. Perfect for grades 3-5.

1. Friends Fur-Ever (2022, Scholastic Paperbacks, ISBN 978-1-3387-8342-1)
2. Kitten Chaos (2022, Scholastic Paperbacks, ISBN 978-1-3387-8345-2)
3. Bunny Bonanza (2023, Scholastic Paperbacks, ISBN 978-1-3387-8348-3)
4. Dog's Best Friend (2023, Scholastic Paperbacks, ISBN 978-1-3387-8351-3)

=== Yasmin series ===
The Yasmin series is Faruqi's most popular and best selling series. It features a seven year old Muslim girl named Yasmin, and her family, which includes her parents and grandparents. This is an early reader series for grades 1-2, and is illustrated by Hatem Aly. Some titles are also published in Spanish and French Canadian.

1. Yasmin the Builder (2018, ISBN 978-1-5158-2727-6)
2. Yasmin the Explorer (2018, ISBN 978-1-5158-2729-0)
3. Yasmin the Fashionista (2018, ISBN 978-1-5158-3103-7)
4. Yasmin the Painter (2018, ISBN 978-1-5158-2728-3)
5. Yasmin the Chef (2019, ISBN 978-1-5158-3784-8)
6. Yasmin the Superhero (2019, ISBN 978-1-5158-3783-1)
7. Yasmin the Teacher (2019, ISBN 978-1-5158-3782-4)
8. Yasmin the Zookeeper (2019, ISBN 978-1-5158-4581-2)
9. Yasmin the Friend (2020, ISBN 978-1-5158-4644-4)
10. Yasmin the Gardener (2020, ISBN 978-1-5158-4641-3)
11. Yasmin the Soccer Star (2020, ISBN 978-1-5158-5886-7)
12. Yasmin the Writer (2020, ISBN 978-1-5158-4643-7)
13. Yasmin the Librarian (2021, ISBN 978-1-5158-8372-2)
14. Yasmin the Recycler (2021, ISBN 978-1-5158-8374-6)
15. Yasmin the Scientist (2021, ISBN 978-1-5158-8373-9)
16. Yasmin the Singer (2021, ISBN 978-1-5158-8375-3)
17. Yasmin the Detective (2022, ISBN 978-1-6639-5929-4)
18. Yasmin the Doctor (2022, ISBN 978-1-6639-5930-0)
19. Yasmin the Farmer (2022, ISBN 978-1-6663-3140-0)
20. Yasmin the Ice Skater (2022, ISBN 978-1-6663-3147-9)
