= Kay O'Neill =

New Zealand comic artist

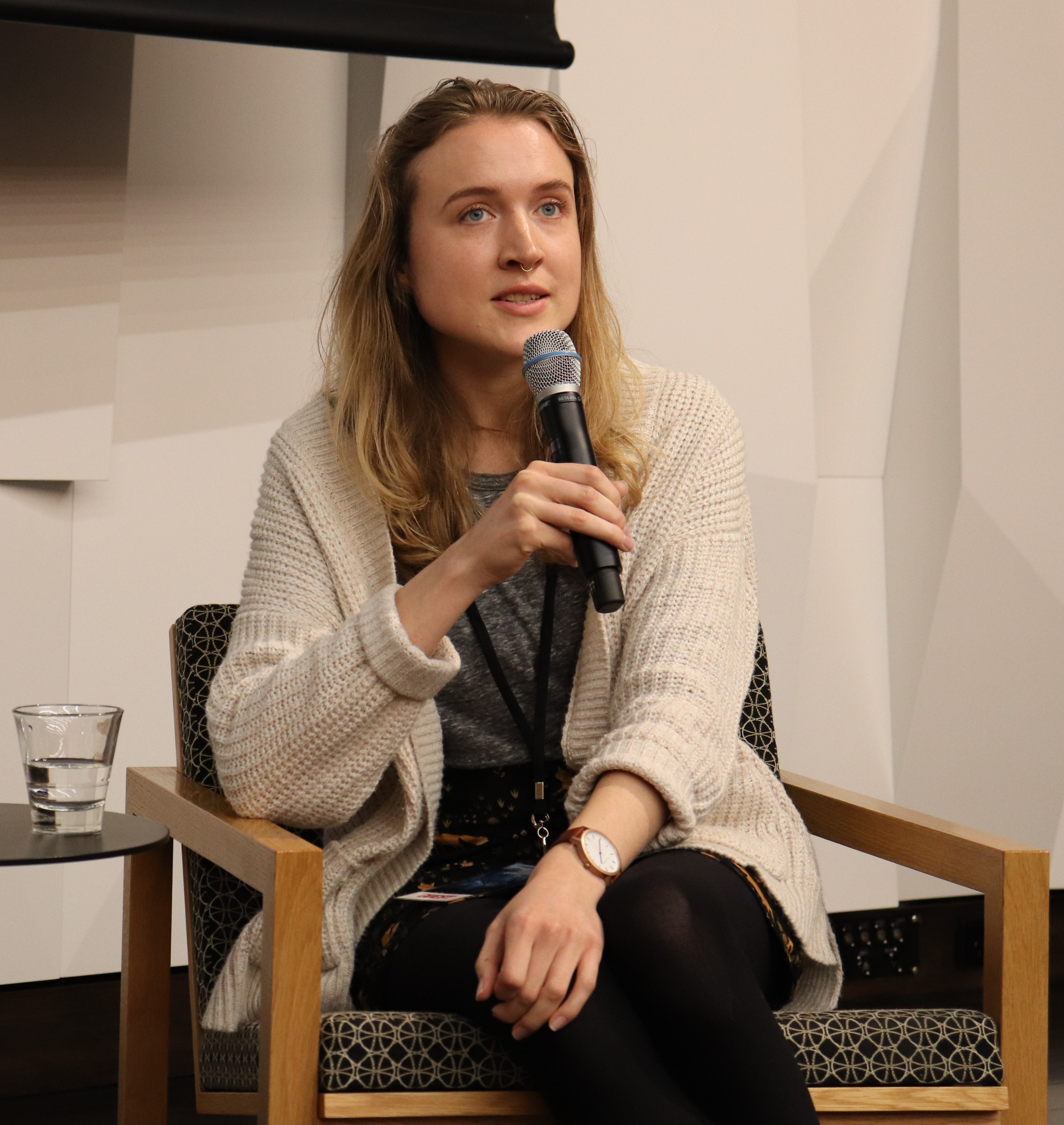
- O'Neill in 2019
- Occupations: Illustrator and writer
- Writing career
- Notable awards: Eisner Award (2018); Harvey Award (2018)

Kay O'Neill (also known as K. O'Neill, and who has published under the name Katie O'Neill) is an illustrator and writer from New Zealand.

== Biography ==
O'Neill is a self-taught artist who has produced several comics and graphic novels. They initially built a fan base by publishing comics on their Tumblr page, such as Princess Princess, which was later published as a book by Oni Press as Princess Princess Ever After. O'Neill notes "a different kind of accessibility and visibility that comes with a book, particularly one that is in easy reach of kids’ hands in school and public libraries".

Their graphic novels cover fantasy, slice-of-life stories which are intended for all ages. These have won multiple awards, with The Tea Dragon Society in particular winning two Eisner Awards, a Harvey Award, and a Dwayne McDuffie Award for Kids' Comics. The Tea Dragon Society also led to a card game and plushies, and two subsequent Tea Dragon books were published in 2019 and 2021. When not working on a book, O'Neill is a fulltime freelance illustrator.

O'Neil's work often includes LGBT+ characters and positive messages; they consider inclusiveness to be important, and believe that media "should reflect the diversity of the world around us." To this end they portray different identities in their stories. The Tea Dragon Society was included in the American Library Association's Rainbow Book List for 2018. Princess Princess Ever After was also on the Rainbow Book List in 2017, making its top ten, and was awarded Autostraddle's Favourite Graphic Novel/Book in 2014. Autostraddle writer Mey said that Princess Princess Ever After "has characters of different races and body types. It has two princesses who are their own heroes and don’t need to change who they are to save themselves and the day. It has a really cute queer couple. And all of this is in an all-ages comic." O'Neill has said that "with consciousness of a new generation I would like to try to make books that inspire kindness, self-acceptance and social responsibility."

In a Twitter post of 18 December 2020, O'Neill said that they prefer to be known as Kay and use they/them pronouns.

=== Awards ===
Year	Nominated work	Category	Result	Notes
2019	Aquicorn Cove	Eisner Award: Best Publication for Kids (ages 9–12)	Nominated	
2018	The Tea Dragon Society	Eisner Award: Best Publication for Kids (ages 9–12)	Won	
2018	The Tea Dragon Society	Eisner Award: Best Webcomic	Won	
2018	The Tea Dragon Society	Dwayne McDuffie Award for Kids' Comics	Won	
2018	The Tea Dragon Society	Harvey Award: Best Children or Young Adult Book	Won	Co-winner with The Prince and the Dressmaker
2014	Princess Princess Ever After	Cybils Award	Nominated	
2014	Princess Princess Ever After	Autostraddle: Favorite Graphic Novel/Book	Won	

=== Works ===
- Counting Stars (2012), webcomic
- Song of the Wheel (2012), webcomic
- The Girl from Hell City (2013), webcomic
- The Girl With Eyes Like a Cat (2013), webcomic
- Don't Let Go (2013), webcomic
- Below the Waves (2014), webcomic>
- Mushrooms (2014), webcomic
- Princess Princess Ever After (2016), published by Oni Press (first version published as a 2014 webcomic titled Princess Princess)
- The Tea Dragon Society (2017), published by Oni Press
- Aquicorn Cove (2018), published by Oni Press
- The Tea Dragon Festival (2019), published by Oni Press
- Dewdrop (2020), published by Oni Press
- How to Date Your Dragon (2020) webcomic
- The Tea Dragon Tapestry (2021) by Oni Press
- The Moth Keeper (2023) by Random House Graphic
- A Song for You and I (2025) by Random House Graphic
