= Sisters (graphic novel) =

2014 graphic novel

- Sisters cover
- Author: Raina Telgemeier
- Genre: Autobiography; graphic novel; nonfiction
- Publisher: Scholastic/Graphix
- Publication date: September 2014
- Media type: Print (hardcover and paperback)
- Pages: 197
- Awards: Eisner for Best Writer/Artist, 2015
- ISBN: 978-0-545-54066-7
- OCLC: 880900848
- Dewey Decimal: 306.8753
- LC Class: HQ759.96.T46 2014
- Preceded by: Smile
- Followed by: Guts
- Website: goraina.com/sisters

Sisters is an autobiographical graphic novel written by Raina Telgemeier as a follow-up to her earlier graphic memoir Smile. It details a long summer road trip taken from San Francisco to Colorado Springs by her family and explores the relationship between Raina and her younger sister, Amara.

== Technical ==
Raina Telgemeier submitted a storyboard/thumbnail draft to her sister three years before the novel's publication, seeking Amara's permission to tell her side of their story. Amara provided insights on some of the vignettes and helped Raina develop a second draft.

The panels were colored by Braden Lamb.

== Reception ==
The book received positive reviews. Maya Van Wagenen, reviewing for The New York Times described the story as "[one] we have all lived [...] uncomfortable yet transcendent" and added it was "a quick read as well as a fun one." Kirkus Reviews called it "a winner," "laugh-out-loud funny [...] and quietly serious all at once"; later, Kirkus designated it one of the best books for children in 2014. According to School Library Journal, "[r]eaders will be very satisfied". Horn Book Magazine gave it a starred review in 2014.

In 2015, Telgemeier won an Eisner Award for Best Writer/Artist, citing Sisters. It was also named to the Young Adult Library Services Association's 2015 shortlist of Great Graphic Novels for Teens, and a 2015 Association for Library Service to Children Notable Children's Book for Middle Readers.

As of 2017 the paperback version had spent 117 weeks on The New York Times Best Sellers list under the category "Paperback Graphic Books."
