= The Tea Dragon Society =

2016 webcomic by Kay O'Neill

- Author: Kay O'Neill
- Illustrator: Kay O'Neill
- Language: English
- Genre: Fantasy
- Publisher: Oni Press (hardcover)
- Publication date: 2016 (webcomic); October 31, 2017 (hardcover)
- Publication place: New Zealand
- Pages: 72
- Awards: Eisner Award; Harvey Award
- ISBN: 978-1-62010-441-5
- Website: Official site

The Tea Dragon Society is a webcomic and graphic novel written and illustrated by Kay O'Neill which debuted late 2016. The story focuses on Greta, an apprentice blacksmith who becomes fascinated by "tea dragons" after rescuing one.

Published as a webcomic, it was later published in physical format by Oni Press. It was well received by critics, who praised O'Neill's art and the comic's story, as well as the diverse cast of characters. The Tea Dragon Society received two Eisner Awards and a Harvey Award in 2018, and was turned into a series after two more books were released.

== Plot ==
The webcomic begins with Greta's mother showing her how to forge a sword in their blacksmith's shop, a skill slowly being abandoned, as those kinds of weapons are no longer needed. While returning from some errands, Greta finds a small creature cornered by hungry animals. She feeds them and rescues the creature, which her father explains is called a tea dragon, and says he knows its owner, Hesekiel. Greta then goes to the tea shop where Hesekiel thanks her for returning the dragon and explains what they are.

A month later, Greta accepts Hesekiel's invitation to help tend to tea dragons and begins visiting the shop, where she becomes acquainted with Minette, a girl with memory loss issues who has been living there for a couple of months, and Erik, Hesekiel's significant other. Greta and Minette become fast friends, with the latter talking about her past as a prophetess. After some time helping around the shop, Hesekiel and Erik talk about the origin of the Tea Dragon Society, with the two as their last remaining members. They also explain that drinking the tea made from the leaves of these creatures allows one to see their memories, and Greta learns about the couple's past as adventurers before an injury forces Erik to retire.

In the last chapter and the epilogue, Minette shares her memory with Greta, of the year she spent living with Hesekiel and Erik. Greta then creates an iron teapot in her blacksmithy as a gift. Afterward, she is given the opportunity to take care of a tea dragon whose owner had died, which she accepts. Hesekiel and Erik then decide to invite her and Minette to be a part of the Tea Dragon Society.

== Background ==
According to an interview for The Mary Sue, the concept for the webcomic first began with the creation of the tea dragons, which was done by mixing two things the author loved. The dragons, which must be tended to produce tea, allowed the author to introduce the importance of keeping "traditions and crafts" alive into the plot. O'Neill also mentioned the Little Golden Books as influences when creating The Tea Dragon Society.

== Publication history ==
Kay O'Neill was first approached by Oni Press' editor Ari Yarwood, who was looking for comics with LGBT stories and themes, and picked up O'Neill's webcomic Princess Princess to publish. In September 2016, they announced their next webcomic, The Tea Dragon Society, which would also be published in book format in late 2017 by Oni Press.

While it was initially conceived as a standalone story, O'Neill later created new characters and plots for the comic while working on Aquicorn Cove. The second book in the "Tea Dragon" series, The Tea Dragon Festival, was released in september 2019, and the third, The Tea Dragon Tapestry, in June 2021.

== Reception ==
Publishers Weekly commented on the color pallette used by O'Neill in the webcomic, saying the panels drawn by them "hum with a subtle romantic energy", and concluded the review by calling The Tea Dragon Society a "quiet, charming story of nurturing friendships and traditions." The School Library Journal, which listed the comic in its "Top 10 Graphic Novels" of 2017, praised its inclusiveness and called it a "more innocent version of Brian K. Vaughan and Fiona Staples's 'Saga'", mainly due to the design of its characters, which are mostly horned. The reviewer also praised the art, specially the background, which they said "are an integral and memorable part of the story".

A reviewer writing for GeekDad praised the diversity present in the story, noting this was the aspect that most called their attention. According to GeekDad, "the story [...] never feels the need to call attention to the fact that diverse people exist within its pages, or to congratulate itself for including them", an aspect that differentiates the diversity of The Tea Dragon Society from most other media. They concluded the review by calling it "delightful".

Autostraddle called the comic's art "a delight to behold", which assisted in highlighting the cast "with soft voices, soft hearts, and strong character". They also wrote about the "comforting and relaxing" atmosphere found in O'Neill's work and called the tea dragons "one of the freshest ideas I’ve seen in western-based fantasy in a long time." Kirkus Reviews called the comic "[u]ndeniably whimsical and extremely cute" and commented on the diversity in "skin colors, orientations, and abilities" found among the characters. The Booklist said "[r]eaders will be drawn in equally by the inventive story and gorgeous artwork" and compared O'Neill's art style to that of manga, with the difference that they use "lovely colors and lack of harsh outlines."

=== Accolades ===
The Tea Dragon Society was the recipient of two Eisner Awards in 2018, in the "Best Publication for Kids" and "Best Webcomic" categories. The comic also received the Harvey Award for "Best Children or Young Adult Book", an award shared with The Prince and the Dressmaker.

== Adaptation ==
In October 2017, it was announced that Oni Press' gaming division, Oni Games, and Renegade Game Studios had been working together with Steve Ellis and Tyler Tinsley to create a card game based on The Tea Dragon Society. Released in 2018, the game received an Origins Award for "best family game".

A new tabletop game, called Autumn Harvest: A Tea Dragon Society Card Game, was announced in July 2020. It was based on O'Neill's second book in the series, The Tea Dragon Festival, and can be played either standalone or alongside the first game.
