= Cybils Awards for Graphic Novel =

Annual literary awards

The Cybils Awards for Nonfiction are annual literary awards for children's graphic novels. The awards consist of two categories, both established in 2006: elementary and middle grade and young adult. The award was last presented in 2024, with the organization taking a hiatus in 2025.

== Recipients ==
=== Elementary and middle grade (2006–) ===
Year	Contributors	Title	Result	Ref.
2006	Jimmy Gownley	Amelia Rules! Vol. 3: Superheroes	Winner	
2006	Alex De Campi, illus. by Federica Manfredi	Kat and Mouse	Finalists	
2006	Jennifer Holm and Matt Holm	Babymouse: Beach Babe	Finalists	
2006	Ann Martin and Raina Telgemeier, ilus. by Jimmy Gownley	The Baby-Sitters Club: Kristy's Great Idea	Finalists	
2006	Siena Siegel, illus. by Mark Siegl	To Dance: A Ballerina's Graphic Novel	Finalists	
2007	Eoin Colfer and Andrew Donkin, illus. by Giovanni Rigano and Paolo Lamanna	Artemis Fowl: The Graphic Novel	Winner	
2007	Jennifer L. Holm and Matthew Holm	Camp Babymouse	Finalists	
2007	Rod Espinosa	The Courageous Princess	Finalists	
2007	Sara Varon	Robot Dreams	Finalists	
2007	Kiyohiko Azuma, trans. by Amy Forsyth	Yotsuba&! Vol. 4	Finalists	
2008	Shannon Hale and Dean Hale, illus. by Nathan Hale	Rapunzel's Revenge	Winner	
2008	Hope Larson	Chiggers	Finalists	
2008	Don Wood	Into the Volcano	Finalists	
2008	Kean Soo	Jellaby, Vol. 1	Finalists	
2008	David Almond, illus. by Dave McKean	The Savage	Finalists	
2008	Zoe Alley, illus. by R. W. Alley	There's a Wolf at the Door	Finalists	
2009	Eleanor Davis	The Secret Science Alliance and the Copycat Crook	Winner	
2009	James Sturm, Andrew Arnold, and Alexis Frederick-Frost	Adventures in Cartooning	Finalist	
2009	Aaron Reynolds, illus. by Neil Numberman	Creepy Crawly Crime	Finalist	
2009	Eric Wight	Frankie Pickle and the Closet of Doom	Finalist	
2009	Kazu Kibuishi	The Stonekeeper's Curse	Finalist	
2010	Jason Shiga	Meanwhile: Pick Any Path. 3856 Story Possibilities	Winner	
2010	George O'Connor	Athena: Grey-Eyed Goddess	Finalist	
2010	Colleen A. F. Venable, illus. by Stephanie Yue	Guinea Pig, Pet Shop Private Eye 1: Hamster and Cheese	Finalist	
2010	Raina Telgemeier	Smile	Finalist	
2010	Aaron Renier	The Unsinkable Walker Bean	Finalist	
2011	Ben Hatke	Zita the Spacegirl	Winner	
2011	Barry Deutsch	Hereville: How Mirka Got Her Sword	Finalist	
2011	Chris Duffy (ed.)	Nursery Rhyme Comics	Finalist	
2011	Dan Santat	Sidekicks	Finalist	
2011	Brian Selznick	Wonderstruck	Finalist	
2012	Jorge Aguirre, illus. by Rafael Rosado with John Novak and Matthew Schenk	Giants Beware!	Winner	
2012	Joseph Lambert	Annie Sullivan and the Trials of Helen Keller	Finalist	
2012	Colleen A. F. Venable	Hilda and the Midnight Giant	Finalist	
2012	Na Liu, illus. by Andrés Vera Martínez	Little White Duck: A Childhood in China	Finalist	
2012	Nathan Hale	Nathan Hale's Hazardous Tales: Big Bad Ironclad!	Finalist	
2013	Barry Deutsch	Hereville: How Mirka Met a Meteorite	Winner	
2013	Matt Phelan	Bluffton: My Summers with Buster Keaton	Finalist	
2013	John Lewis with Andrew Aydin, illus. by Nate Powell	March Book 1	Finalist	
2013	Rob Harrell	Monster on the Hill	Finalist	
2013	Nathan Hale	Donner Dinner Party	Finalist	
2013	Jennifer L. Holm and Matthew Holm	Squish: Game On!	Finalist	
2013	Greg Ruth	The Lost Boy	Finalist	
2014	Cece Bell, colored by David Lasky	El Deafo	Winner	
2014	John Allison	Bad Machinery: The Case of the Good Boy	Finalist	
2014	Blexbolex, trans. by Claudia Zoe Bedrick	Ballad	Finalist	
2014	James Burks	Bird & Squirrel on Ice	Finalist	
2014	Matt Faulkner	Gaijin: American Prisoner of War	Finalist	
2014	Loic Dauvillier, illus. by Marc Lizano, inked by Greg Salsedo, and trans. by Alexis Siegel	Hidden: A Child's Story of the Holocaust	Finalist	
2014	Jimmy Gownley	The Dumbest Idea Ever!	Finalist	
2015	Victoria Jamieson	Roller Girl	Winner	
2015	Marika McCoola, illus. by Emily Carroll	Baba Yaga's Assistant	Finalist	
2015	Ted Naifeh	Tales of a Warlock	Finalist	
2015	Jorge Aguirre, illus. by Rafael Rosado, colored by John Novak	Dragons Beware!	Finalist	
2015	Gene Luen Yang and Mike Holmes	Secret Coders	Finalist	
2015	Jennifer L. Holm, illus. by Matthew Holm, colored by Lark Pien	Sunny Side Up	Finalist	
2015	Brian Selznick	The Marvels	Finalist	
2016	Cathy Camper, illus. by Raúl the Third	Lowriders to the Center of the Earth	Winner	
2016	Eric Orchard	Bera the One-Headed Troll	Finalist	
2016	Hope Larson, illus. by Rebecca Mock	Compass South	Finalist	
2016	Ben Hatke	Mighty Jack	Finalist	
2016	Kay O'Neill	Princess Princess Ever After	Finalist	
2016	Faith Erin Hicks, color by Jordie Bellaire	The Nameless City	Finalist	
2016	William Grill	The Wolves of Currumpaw	Finalist	
2017	Julie Kim	Where's Halmoni?	Winner	
2017	Nidhi Chanani	Pashmina	Finalist	
2017	Shannon Hale, illus. by LeUyen Pham, and colored by Jane Poole	Real Friends	Finalist	
2017	Ginger Ly, illus. by Molly Park	Suee and the Shadow	Finalist	
2017	Benjamin Renner	The Big Bad Fox	Finalist	
2017	Robert Kondo and Dice Tsutsumi	The Dam Keeper	Finalist	
2018	Lee Knox Ostertag	The Witch Boy	Winner	
2018	Mariah Marsden, illus. by Brenna Thummler	Anne of Green Gables	Finalist	
2018	Vera Brosgol	Be Prepared	Finalist	
2018	Samya Kullab, illus. by Jackie Roche	Escape from Syria	Finalist	
2018	Aron Nels Steinke	Mr. Wolf's Class	Finalist	
2018	Chad Sell	The Cardboard Kingdom	Finalist	
2018	Katie O'Neill	The Tea Dragon Society	Finalist	
2019	Jerry Craft	New Kid	Winner	
2019	Svetlana Chmakova	Crush	Finalist	
2019	Rey Terciero	Meg, Jo, Beth, and Amy	Finalist	
2019	Kyo Maclear	Operatic	Finalist	
2019	Lee Knox Ostertag	The Hidden Witch	Finalist	
2019	Katie O'Neill	The Tea Dragon Festival	Finalist	
2019	Emily Tetri	Tiger vs. Nightmare	Finalist	
2020	Victoria Jamieson and Omar Mohamed, illus. by Victoria Jamieson and	When Stars Are Scattered	Winner	
2020	James Otis Smith	Black Heroes of the Wild West	Finalists	
2020	Jerry Craft, illus. by Jerry Craft	Class Act	Finalists	
2020	Mika Song	Donut Feed the Squirrels	Finalists	
2020	Lily Williams and Karen Schneemann	Go with the Flow	Finalists	
2020	Kat Leyh	Snapdragon	Finalists	
2020	Johan Troïanowski	The Runaway Princess	Finalists	
2021	Lily LaMotte, illus. by Ann Xu	Measuring Up	Winner	
2021	Thomas King, illus. by Natasha Donovan	Borders	Finalist	
2021	Yehudi Mercado	Chunky	Finalist	
2021	Katherine Battersby	Cranky Chicken	Finalist	
2021	Nidhi Chanani	Jukebox	Finalist	
2021	Hope Larson, illus. by Rebecca Mock	Salt Magic	Finalist	
2021	Shing Yin Khor	The Legend of Auntie Po	Finalist	
2022	Christina Diaz Gonzalez, illus. by Gabriela Epstein	Invisible: A Graphic Novel	Winner	
2022	Jonathan Case	Little Monarchs	Finalist	
2022	Nadia Shammas and Sara Alfageeh	Squire	Finalist	
2022	Johnnie Christmas	Swim Team	Finalist	
2022	Guojing	The Flamingo	Finalist	
2022	Kate Ashwin, Kel McDonald, and Alina Pete (eds.)	The Woman in the Woods	Finalist	
2022	Marjorie Liu, illus. by Teny Assakhanian	Wingbearer	Finalist	
2023	Dan Santat	A First Time for Everything	Winner	
2023	Lee Knox Ostertag, illustrated by Xanthe Bouma	Dungeons & Dragons: Dungeon Club: Roll Call	Finalist	
2023	Claribel A. Ortega, illustrated by Rose Bousamra	Frizzy	Finalist	
2023	Wendy Mass, illustrated by Gabi Mendez	Lo and Behold	Finalist	
2023	Pedro Martín	Mexikid	Finalist	
2023	Amparo Ortiz, illustrated by Ronnie Vazquez	Saving Chupie	Finalist	
2023	Ben Hatke	Things in the Basement	Finalist	
2024	Sherri L. Smith, illustrated by Christine Norrie	Pearl: A Graphic Novel	Winner	
2024	Mai K. Nguyen	Anzu and the Realm of Darkness	Finalist	
2024	Kathy MacLeod	Continental Drifter	Finalist	
2024	Maple Lam	Monkey King and the World of Myths: The Monster and the Maze	Finalist	
2024	Pan Cooke	Puzzled: A Memoir about Growing Up with OCD	Finalist	
2024	Ruth Chan	Uprooted: A Memoir About What Happens When Your Family Moves Back	Finalist	
2024	Hena Khan, illustrated by Safiya Zerrougui	We Are Big Time	Finalist	

=== Young adult (2006–) ===
Year	Contributor(s)	Title	Result	Ref.
2006	Gene Luen Yang	American Born Chinese	Winner	
2006	Linda Medley	Castle Waiting	Finalists	
2006	Svetlana Chmakova	Dramacon, Vol. 2	Finalists	
2006	Kazu Kibuishi	Flight, Vol. 3	Finalists	
2006	Jessica Abel	La Perdida	Finalists	
2007	Joann Sfar, illus. by Emmanuel Guibert	The Professor's Daughter	Winner	
2007	Shaun Tan	The Arrival	Finalists	
2007	Kazu Kibuishi (ed.)	Flight Vol. 4	Finalists	
2007	Nick Abadzis	Laika	Finalists	
2007	Cecil Castellucci, illus. by Jim Rugg	The Plain Janes	Finalists	
2008	Mariko Tamaki, illus. by Steve Rolston	Emiko Superstar	Winner	
2008	Holly Black, illus. by Ted Naifeh	Kin	Finalists	
2008	Jessica Abel and Gabe Soria, illus. by Warren Pleece	Life Sucks	Finalists	
2008	Mariko Tamaki, illus. by Jillian Tamaki	Skim	Finalists	
2008	Cyril Pedrosa, trans. by Edward Gauvin	Three Shadows	Finalists	
2009	Tom Siddell	Gunnerkrigg Court: Orientation	Winner	
2009	Chris Schweizer	Crogan's Vengeance	Finalist	
2009	Edgar Allan Poe, illus. by Gris Grimly	Edgar Allan Poe's Tales of Death and Dementia	Finalist	
2009	Tony Lee, illus. by Sam Hart and Artur Fujita	Outlaw: The Legend of Robin Hood	Finalist	
2009	Lora Innes	The Dreamer: The Consequence of Nathan Hale, Part 1	Finalist	
2010	G. Neri, illus. by Randy DuBurke	Yummy: the Last Days of a Southside Shorty	Winner	
2010	Doug TenNapel	Ghostopolis	Finalist	
2010	Hope Larson	Mercury	Finalist	
2010	Peter and Bobby Timony	Night Owls Vol. 1	Finalist	
2010	Kou Yaginuma, trans. by Maya Rosewood	Twin Spica, Vol. 1	Finalist	
2011	Vera Brosgol	Anya's Ghost	Winner	
2011	Doug TenNapel	Bad Island	Finalist	
2011	Jim Ottaviani, illus. by Leland Myrick	Feynman	Finalist	
2011	Gene Luen Yang, art by Thien Pham	Level Up	Finalist	
2011	Laura Lee Gulledge	Page by Paige	Finalist	
2012	Faith Erin Hicks	Friends With Boys	Winner	
2012	Lila Quintero Weaver	Darkroom: A Memoir in Black and White	Finalist	
2012	Raina Telgemeier	Drama	Finalist	
2012	Ryan Inzana	Ichiro	Finalist	
2012	Boaz Yakin, illus. by Joe Infurnari	Marathon	Finalist	
2013	Jordan Mechner, illus. by LeUyen Pham and Alex Puvilland	Templar	Winner	
2013	John Allison	Bad Machinery	Finalist	
2013	Gene Luen Yang	Boxers & Saints	Finalist	
2013	Kelly Sue Deconnick with Dexter Soy, illus. by Emma Ríos	Captain Marvel, Vol. 1: In Pursuit of Flight	Finalist	
2013	Tony Cliff	Delilah Dirk and the Turkish Lieutenant	Finalist	
2013	Junji Ito	Uzumaki	Finalist	
2013	Sharon McKay, illus. by Daniel LaFrance	War Brothers	Finalist	
2014	Cory Doctorow, illus. by Jen Wang	In Real Life	Winner	
2014	Joel Christian Gill	Strange Fruit, Vol. I: Uncelebrated Narratives from Black History	Finalist	
2014	Max Brooks, illus. by Caanan White	The Harlem Hellfighters	Finalist	
2014	Gene Luen Yang and Sonny Liew	The Shadow Hero	Finalist	
2014	Emily Carroll	Through the Woods	Finalist	
2014	Shane Koyczan	To This Day: For the Bullied and Beautiful	Finalist	
2015	ND Stevenson	Nimona	Winner	
2015	Maggie Thrash	Honor Girl	Finalist	
2015	Christos Gage, Ruth Gage, and Jackie Lewis	Lion of Rora	Finalist	
2015	John Lewis with Andrew Aydin, illus. by Nate Powell	March: Book Two	Finalist	
2015	G. Willow Wilson. art by Adrian Alphona	Ms. Marvel	Finalist	
2015	Ben Towle	Oyster War	Finalist	
2015	Henrik Rehr	Terrorist: Gavrilo Princip, the Assassin Who Ignited World War I	Finalist	
2016	John Lewis with Andrew Aydin, illus. by Nate Powell	March: Book Three	Winner	
2016	Özge Samancı	Dare to Disappoint: Growing Up in Turkey	Finalist	
2016	Jody Houser, art by Francis Portela and Marguerite Sauvage	Faith Vol. 1: Hollywood and Vine	Finalist	
2016	Ananth Hirsh and Yuko Ota	Lucky Penny	Finalist	
2016	Marjorie Liu, illus. by Sana Takeda	Monstress Vol. 1: Awakening	Finalist	
2016	G. Willow Wilson. art by Adrian Alphona	Ms. Marvel Vol. 5: Super Famous	Finalist	
2016	Derf Backderf	Trashed	Finalist	
2017	Scott Westerfeld, illus. by Alex Puvilland	Spill Zone	Winner	
2017	Kieron Moore, illus. by Rajesh Nagulakonda	Buddha: An Enlightened Life	Finalist	
2017	Gene Luen Yang	New Super-Man Vol. 1: Made in China (Rebirth)	Finalist	
2017	Cecil Castellucci, illus. by José Pimienta	Soupy Leaves Home	Finalist	
2017	Tillie Walden	Spinning	Finalist	
2017	Tyson Hesse	Diesel: Ignition	Finalist	
2018	Jarrett J. Krosoczka	Hey, Kiddo	Winner	
2018	Anne Frank, adapted by Ari Folman	Anne Frank's Diary	Finalist	
2018	Melanie Gillman	As the Crow Flies	Finalist	
2018	G. Neri, illus. by Corban Wilkin	Grand Theft Horse	Finalist	
2018	Tillie Walden	On a Sunbeam	Finalist	
2018	Sebastian Kadlecik (creator), Kit Steinkellner (writer), Emma Steinkellner (illus.), and Valeria Tranier (trans.)	Quince	Finalist	
2018	Jen Wang	The Prince and the Dressmaker	Finalist	
2019	David A. Robertson, Jen Storm, Katherena Vermette, Niigaanwewidam James Sinclair, Rachel Qitsualik-Tinsley, Richard Van Camp, Sean Qitsualik-Tinsley, and Sonny Assu	This Place: 150 Years Retold	Winner	
2019	Vera Greentea and Yana Bogatch	Grimoire Noir	Finalist	
2019	Colleen A. F. Venable, illus. by Ellen T. Crenshaw	Kiss Number 8	Finalist	
2019	Suzanne Walker, art by Wendy Xu	Mooncakes	Finalist	
2019	Tasha Spillett	Surviving the City	Finalist	
2019	George Takei	They Called Us Enemy	Finalist	
2020	Gene Luen Yang, illus. by Gurihiru	Superman Smashes the Klan	Winner	
2020	Robin Ha, illus. by Robin Ha	Almost American Girl	Finalist	
2020	Tyler Feder	Dancing at the Pity Party	Finalist	
2020	Kiku Hughes	Displacement	Finalist	
2020	Mike Curato, illus. by Mike Curato	Flamer	Finalist	
2020	Huda Fahmy	That Can Be Arranged	Finalist	
2020	Alex Sanchez, illus. by Jul Maroh	You Brought Me the Ocean	Finalist	
2021	Crystal Frasier, illus. by Val Wise and Oscar O. Jupiter (letterer)	Cheer Up: Love and Pompoms	Winner	
2021	Alverne Ball, illus. by Stacey Robinson, Reynaldo Anderson, and Colette Yellow Robe	Across the Tracks: Remembering Greenwood, Black Wall Street, and the Tulsa Race Massacre	Finalist	
2021	Don Brown	In the Shadow of the Fallen Towers: The Seconds, Minutes, Hours, Days, Weeks, Months, and Years after the 9/11 Attacks	Finalist	
2021	Marie-Noëlle Hébert, trans. by Shelley Tanaka	My Body in Pieces	Finalist	
2021	Mark Crilley	My Last Summer with Cass	Finalist	
2021	L. L. McKinney, illus. by Robyn Smith	Nubia: Real One	Finalist	
2021	Lee Knox Ostertag	The Girl from the Sea	Finalist	
2022	Laura Gao	Messy Roots: A Graphic Memoir of a Wuhanese American	Winner	
2022	Blue Delliquanti	Across a Field of Starlight	Finalist	
2022	Huda Fahmy	Huda F Are You?	Finalist	
2022	Talia Dutton	M Is for Monster	Finalist	
2022	Kindra Neely	Numb to This: Memoir of a Mass Shooting	Finalist	
2022	Sarah Winifred Searle	The Greatest Thing	Finalist	
2022	Tommie Smith, Derrick Barnes, and Dawud Anyabwile	Victory. Stand!: Raising My Fist for Justice	Finalist	
2023	Deb JJ Lee	In Limbo	Winner	
2023	Jasmine Walls, illustrated by Teo DuVall	Brooms	Finalist	
2023	Mark Crilley	Lost in Taiwan	Finalist	
2023	Kerilynn Wilson	The Faint of Heart	Finalist	
2023	Antonio Iturbe, illustrated by Loreto Aroca, adapted by Salva Rubi, and translated by Lilit Thwaites	The Librarian of Auschwitz: The Graphic Novel	Finalist	
2023	Deya Muniz	The Princess and the Grilled Cheese Sandwich	Finalist	
2023	Tracy White	Unaccompanied: Stories of Brave Teenagers Seeking Asylum	Finalist	
2024	Samuel Teer, illustrated by Julia Mar	Brownstone	Winner	
2024	Rosena Fung	Age 16	Finalist	
2024	Jen Wang	Ash's Cabin	Finalist	
2024	Theo Parish	Homebody	Finalist	
2024	Ernesto Saade	Just Another Story: A Graphic Migration Account	Finalist	
2024	Kim Hyun Sook and Ryan Estrada	No Rules Tonight	Finalist	
2024	G. Neri, illustrated by David Brame	Safe Passage	Finalist	

== See also ==
- Cybils Awards for Nonfiction
- Cybils Awards for Fiction
- Cybils Awards for Speculative Fiction
