= Eisner Award for Best Digital Comic =

American comic book award

- Awarded for: Best Digital Comic
- Country: United States
- First award: 2005
- Most recent winner: Practical Defense Against Piracy, by Tony Cliff
- Website: www.comic-con.org/awards/eisner-awards-current-info

The Eisner Award for Best Digital Comic is an award for "creative achievement" in American comic books for material originally published digitally.

== History and name change ==
Webcomics were eligible for the award when it was created in 2005. In 2014, the award was renamed Best Digital/Webcomic. In 2017, it was split into Best Digital Comic and Best Webcomic.

== Winners and nominees ==
Year	Title	Authors	Publisher	Website	Ref.
2000s
2005	Mom's Cancer	Brian Fies		www.momscancer.com	
2005	Athena Voltaire	Steve Bryant			
2005	Copper	Kazu Kibuishi		www.boltcityproductions.com/copper	
2005	Jonny Crossbones	Les McClaine		www.jonnycrossbones.com	
2005	ojingogo	Matthew Forsythe			
2006	PvP	Scott Kurtz		www.pvponline.com	
2006	Copper	Kazu Kibuishi		www.boltcityproductions.com/copper	
2006	Jellaby	Kean Soo		keaner.net/comics/jellaby/	
2006	ojingogo	Matthew Forsythe			
2007	Sam & Max	Steve Purcell			
2007	Bee, in "Motel Art Improvement Service"	Jason Little			
2007	Girl Genius	Phil Foglio and Kaja Foglio		www.girlgeniusonline.com	
2007	Minus	Ryan Armand			
2007	Phables	Brad Guigar			
2007	Shooting War	Anthony Lappé and Dan Goldman			
2008	Sugarshock!	Joss Whedon and Fábio Moon			
2008	The Abominable Charles Christopher	Karl Kerschl		www.karlkerschl.com/abominable	
2008	Billy Dogma — Immortal	Dean Haspiel		Act-i-vate	
2008	The Process	Joe Infurnari			
2008	PX!	Manny Trembley and Eric A. Anderson		www.pxcomic.com	
2009	Finder	Carla Speed McNeil			
2009	BodyWorld	Dash Shaw			
2009	The Lady's Murder	Eliza Frye			
2009	Speak No Evil: Melancholy of a Space Mexican	Elan Trinidad			
2009	Vs.	Alexis Sottile and Joe Infurnari			
2010s
2010	Sin Titulo	Cameron Stewart			
2010	The Abominable Charles Christopher	Karl Kerschl		www.karlkerschl.com/abominable	
2010	Bayou	Jeremy Love			
2010	The Guns of Shadow Valley	Dave Wachter and James Andrew Clark		www.gunsofshadowvalley.com	
2010	Power Out	Nathan Schreiber			
2011	The Abominable Charles Christopher	Karl Kerschl		www.karlkerschl.com/abominable	
2011	The Bean	Travis Hanson		www.beanleafpress.com/comics-bean	
2011	Lackadaisy	Tracy J. Butler		www.lackadaisycats.com	
2011	Max Overacts	Caanan Grall		www.occasionalcomics.com	
2011	Zahra's Paradise	Amir Soltani and Khalil Bendib			
2012	Battlepug	Mike Norton		www.battlepug.com	
2012	Bahrain: Lines in Ink, Lines in the Sand	Josh Neufeld			
2012	Delilah Dirk and the Turkish Lieutenant	Tony Cliff		www.delilahdirk.com	
2012	Outfoxed	Dylan Meconis		www.dylanmeconis.com/outfoxed	
2012	Sarah and the Seed	Ryan Andrews		www.ryan-a.com/comics/sarahandtheseed01.htm	
2013	Bandette	Paul Tobin and Colleen Coover			
2013	Ant Comic	Michael DeForge			
2013	It Will All Hurt	Farel Dalrymple			
2013	Our Bloodstained Roof	Ryan Andrews		www.ryan-a.com/comics/roof.htm	
2013	Oyster War	Ben Towle			
2014	The Oatmeal	Matthew Inman		theoatmeal.com	
2014	As the Crow Flies	Melanie Gillman		www.melaniegillman.com	
2014	Failing Sky	Dax Tran-Caffee		www.failingsky.com	
2014	High Crimes	Christopher Sebela and Ibrahim Moustafa			
2014	The Last Mechanical Monster	Brian Fies			
2015	The Private Eye	Brian K. Vaughan and Marcos Martín	Panel Syndicate		
2015	Bandette	Paul Tobin and Colleen Coover	MonkeyBrain Books/comiXology		
2015	Failing Sky	Dax Tran-Caffee		www.failingsky.com	
2015	The Last Mechanical Monster	Brian Fies			
2015	Nimona	ND Stevenson			
2016	Bandette	Paul Tobin and Colleen Coover	MonkeyBrain Books/comiXology		
2016	Fresh Romance	Janelle Asselin (editor)	Rosy Press		
2016	The Legend of Wonder Woman	Renae De Liz	DC Comics		
2016	Lighten Up	Ronald Wimberly	The Nib	thenib.com/lighten-up-4f7f96ca8a7e	
2016	These Memories Won't Last	Stu Campbell		www.thesememorieswontlast.com	
2017	Bandette	Paul Tobin and Colleen Coover	MonkeyBrain Books/comiXology		
2017	Edison Rex	Chris Roberson and Dennis Culver	MonkeyBrain Books/comiXology	www.edisonrex.net	
2017	Helm	Jehanzeb Hasan and Mauricio Caballero			
2017	On a Sunbeam	Tillie Walden		www.onasunbeam.com	
2017	Universe!	Albert Monteys	Panel Syndicate		
2018	Harvey Kurtzman's Marley's Ghost	Harvey Kurtzman, Josh O'Neill, Shannon Wheeler, and Gideon Kendall	comiXology Originals/Kitchen, Lind & Associates		
2018	Bandette	Paul Tobin and Colleen Coover	MonkeyBrain Books/comiXology		
2018	Barrier	Brian K. Vaughan and Marcos Martín	Panel Syndicate		
2018	The Carpet Merchant of Konstantiniyya	Reimena Yee		www.reimenayee.com/the-carpet-merchant-of-konstantiniyya#readonline	
2018	Contact High	James F. Wright and Josh Eckert			
2018	Quince	Sebastian Kadlecik, Kit Steinkellner, and Emma Steinkellner (trans. Valeria Tranier)	Fanbase Press/comiXology		
2019	Umami	Ken Niimura	Panel Syndicate		
2019	Aztec Empire	Paul Guinan, Anina Bennett, and David Hahn		www.bigredhair.com/books/aztec-empire/about	
2019	The Führer and the Tramp	Sean McArdle, Jon Judy, and Dexter Wee			
2019	The Journey	Pablo Leon	Rewire News Group	www.rewirenewsgroup.com/article/2018/01/08/rewire-exclusive-comic-journey	
2019	The Stone King	Kel McDonald and Tyler Crook	comiXology Originals		
2020	Afterlift	Chip Zdarsky and Jason Loo	comiXology Originals		
2020	Black Water Lilies	Michel Bussi, Frédéric Duval, Didier Cassegrain (trans. Edward Gauvin)	Europe Comics		
2020	Colored: The Unsung Life of Claudette Colvin	Tania de Montaigne, adapted by Emilie Plateau (trans. Montana Kane)	Europe Comics		
2020	Elma, A Bear's Life, vol. 1	Ingrid Chabbert and Léa Mazé (trans. Jenny Aufiery)	Europe Comics		
2020	Mare Internum	Der-shing Helmer	comiXology		
2020	Tales from Behind the Window	Edanur Kuntman (trans. Cem Ulgen)	Europe Comics		
2021	Friday	Ed Brubaker and Marcos Martín	Panel Syndicate		
2021	Genius Animals?	Vali Chandrasekaran and Jun-Pierre Shiozawa		www.geniusanimals.net	
2021	Gentlemind	Juan Díaz Canales, Teresa Valero, Antonio Lapone (trans. Jeremy Melloul)	Europe Comics		
2021	Promethee 13:13	Andy Diggle and Shawn Martinbrough	comiXology Originals/Delcourt		
2021	Olive	Véro Cazot and Lucy Mazel (trans. Jessie Aufiery)	Europe Comics		
2021	Soon	Thomas Cadène and Benjamin Adam (trans. Margaret Besser)	Europe Comics		
2022	Snow Angels	Jeff Lemire and Jock	comiXology Originals		
2022	Days of Sand	Aimée de Jongh (trans. Christopher Bradley)	Europe Comics		
2022	Everyone Is Tulip	Dave Baker and Nicole Goux		www.everyoneistulip.com	
2022	It's Jeff!	Kelly Thompson and Gurihiru	Marvel Comics		
2022	Love After World Domination Vol. 1–3	Hiroshi Noda and Takahiro Wakamatsu (trans. Steven LeCroy)	Kodansha USA		
2023	Barnstormers	Scott Snyder and Tula Lotay	comiXology Originals		
2023	All Princesses Die Before Dawn	Quentin Zuttion (trans. M. B. Valente)			
2023	Behind the Curtain	Sara del Giudice (trans. M. B. Valente)			
2023	Ripple Effects	Jordan Hart, Bruno Chiroleu, Justin Harder, Shane Kadlecik			
2023	Sixty Years in Winter	Ingrid Chabbert and Aimée de Jongh (trans. Matt Madden)	Europe Comics		
2024	Friday, vols. 7–8	Ed Brubaker and Marcos Martín	Panel Syndicate		
2024	Blacksad, Vol. 7: They All Fall Down, Part 2	Juan Díaz Canales and Juanjo Guarnido (trans. Diana Schutz and Brandon Kander)	Europe Comics		
2024	Parliament of Rooks	Abigail Jill Harding			
2024	Delilah Dirk: Practical Defence Against Piracy	Tony Cliff		www.delilahdirk.com	
2024	A Witch's Guide to Burning	Aminder Dhaliwal			
2025	My Journey to Her	Yuna Hirasawa	Kodansha		
2025	The Beauty Salon	Quentin Zuttion, based on the novella by Mario Bellatin (trans. M. B. Valente)			
2025	Beyond the Sea	Anaïs Flogny (trans. Dan Christensen)			
2025	Gonzo: Fear and Loathing in America	Morgan Navarro (trans. Tom Imber)			
2025	The Spider and the Ivy	Grégoire Carle (trans. M. B. Valente)			
2026	Practical Defense Against Piracy	Tony Cliff		Winner	
2026	DeadAss	hakei	Viz Media	Nominee	
2026	In the Real Dark Knight	Jimmy Gownley	G-Ville Comics	Nominee	
2026	The Lycan	Mike Carey, Thomas Jane, David James Kelly, Diego Yapur	Comixology	Nominee	
2026	Overwatch 2: Against the Tide	Brandon Chen, Velinxi	Blizzard Entertainment	Nominee	
2026	The World of Lublu	Charbak Dipta		Nominee	
