= Wolfgang J. Fuchs =

German author (1945–2020)

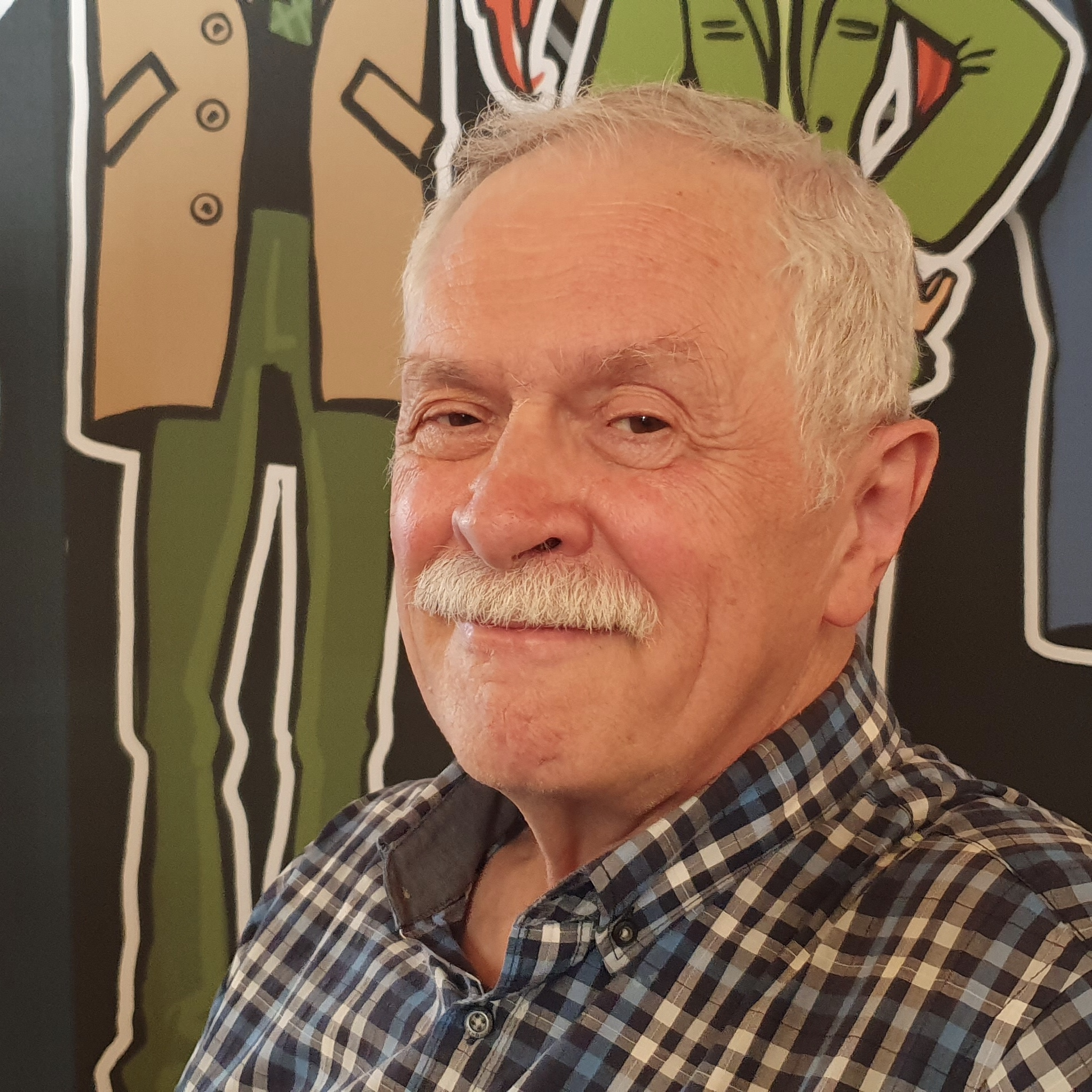
- Wolfgang J. Fuchs at the Comicfestival München in 2019
- Born: 16 September 1945; Unsleben, Lower Franconia, Germany
- Died: 20 January 2020 (aged 74); Munich, Bavaria, Germany
- Occupations: Nonfiction author; Journalist; Comics scholar; Comics artist; Comics translator; Film expert
- Known for: Comics. Anatomie eines Massenmediums
- Awards: Deutscher Jugendliteraturpreis

Wolfgang J. Fuchs (16 September 1945 – 20 January 2020) was a German nonfiction author, journalist, comics scholar, comics author, comics translator and film expert. He co-wrote the first standard work in German on comics as an art form, published in 1971. He translated comics such as Prince Valiant, Garfield, and Mom's Cancer by Brian Fies. The translated book Mutter hat Krebs was awarded the 2007 Deutscher Jugendliteraturpreis.

== Life ==
Wolfgang J. Fuchs was born in Unsleben, Lower Franconia. He studied civil engineering for one semester and then switched to studying Zeitungswissenschaft (print media) with secondary topics American studies and English studies.

Fuchs was among the first German authors who took comics seriously. With Reinhold Reitberger, with whom he grew up and studied, he wrote standards such as Comics. Anatomie eines Massenmediums (Comics, anatomy of a mass medium, 1971) and Comics-Handbuch (Comics handbook, 1978). The 1971 book was the first standard work in German on comics as an art form. It was translated to several languages, and appeared in the United States. Fuchs participated in Maurice Horn's The World Encyclopedia of Comics, the Who's Who of American Comic Books, published by Jerry Bales/Hames Ware, in four volumes between 1973 and 1976. He worked for the Filmnotizbuch 1978/79, belonged to the staff of the Peanuts magazine in 1974/75, and wrote articles for radio and magazines.

Fuchs translated Prince Valiant (in German: Prinz Eisenherz) and Garfield, among others. He was involved in the Disneys Heimliche Helden series (2005–2009), and the Disney's Hall of Fame series (2004–2011), including volumes four and 13. He translated the autobiographical story Mom's Cancer by Brian Fies, which first appeared as a web comic. The translated book, Mutter hat Krebs, was awarded the 2007 Deutscher Jugendliteraturpreis.

Fuchs created comics, such as Berry der Plantagenbär, again with Reitberger, an advertisement for Kaba, which was added to packages of the instant cocoa drink from 1985 to 1990. He wrote the texts of Quark, with artist Günter Mayrhofer, which began in the fall of 1987 in print and television. Fuchs also wrote nonfiction books about German-American topics and about films, such as books about Humphrey Bogart, James Dean and Woody Allen. In 2015, he directed the Comicfestival München together with Heiner Lünstedt.

Fuchs lived in Munich until his death on 20 January 2020.

== Work ==
Publications by Fuchs are held by the German National Library, including:

- with Reinhold C. Reitberger: Panel 1, München: Heinz Moos, (1971)
- with Reinhold C. Reitberger: Comics. Anatomie eines Massenmediums, Gräfelfing near Munich 1971 (with record), ISBN 3-7879-0054-3; and further editions, also entitled Das große Buch der Comics. Anatomie eines Massenmediums
- Comics – harmlose Bildergeschichten (1974)
- as editor: Comics im Medienmarkt – in der Analyse – im Unterricht (VS Verlag für Sozialwissenschaften, 1977), ISBN 978-3-8100-0170-2
- with Reinhold C. Reitberger: Comics-Handbuch, Reinbek bei Hamburg 1978 ISBN 3-499-16215-6
- Die vielen Gesichter des Woody Allen, Taschen, 1988, ISBN 978-3-8228-0028-7
- James Dean. Spuren eines Giganten, Taschen, 1988, ISBN 978-3-8228-0034-8
- Humphrey Bogart. Kult- Star, Taschen, 1988, ISBN 978-3-8228-0032-4
- Micky Maus – Das ist mein Leben, Unipart-Vlg., Remseck (Januar 1991), ISBN 978-3-8122-3086-5
- with Peter Reichelt, Harald Havas and an introduction by Ina Brockmann: Gezeichnet Walt Disney? : Donald, Micky und ihre Väter Carl Barks, Floyd Gottfredson, Al Taliaferro und Walt Disney; der Katalog zur Ausstellung "Donald, Micky und Ihre Väter", Reichelt und Brockmann, Mannheim 2013, ISBN 978-3-923801-58-9
