= Copper (comic) =

Webcomic by Kazu Kibuishi

- Author: Kazu Kibuishi
- Website: https://www.boltcityproductions.com/copper
- Current status/schedule: Hiatus
- Launch date: April 2002

Copper is a 2002 webcomic by Kazu Kibuishi. Consisting of a series of short stories, Copper has a very irregular schedule, with a long hiatus that lasted from 2009 to 2016. Kibuishi's webcomic was nominated for an Eisner Award for Best Digital Comic, and the work was compiled into a print volume in 2010.

== Development ==
Copper began in April 2002. The pages of Kibuishi's webcomic make use of a large, square format, rather than using traditional comic book dimensions. Aside from the first page, all of the Copper pages are presented in color. The schedule of Copper is slow, new updates appearing once a month. Each page of Copper tells a self-contained story, though there are a few recurring characters.

In May 2005 all of the 25 web strips that had been published to date were published as a series of 13" square archival prints by Nucleus, together with some other prints of Kibuishi's artwork. In July 2006, Kibuishi put the webcomic on hiatus again due to work on his graphic novel Amulet, among other projects, and it returned in September 2007. A single page was posted in mid-2009, after which Copper saw no further updates until December 2016, a period of nearly seven years.

== Short stories ==
In each self-contained story the boy Copper and his talking dog Fred journey through a detailed but economically drawn landscape - sometimes beautiful, sometimes bleak, sometimes surreal. Fred usually has some concise and forcefully expressive comment to make on their circumstances, while Copper is generally more cheerfully optimistic. The first three strips suggest that their adventures are dreams. After that the question is usually left open.

In three of the strips, Copper is haunted by a mysterious girl: a redhead who appears to be trapped inside a purple bubble that always floats just out of Copper's reach; a dark-haired girl with amber sunglasses who taunts him from a distance, and a blond girl wearing a red shirt with a P on it. Fred also suffers girl trouble when, to his horror, he falls in love with a female dog owned by another girl.

The first volume of Kibuishi's comic anthology Flight (2004) contains two short Copper stories: the 18-page "Maiden Voyage", and the 4-page "Picnic". A further story, "Mushroom Crossing", appeared in Flight Explorer Volume One. All of these stories have also appeared on the website, but since they were designed for book publication they use traditional print-comic dimensions.

"Maiden Voyage" sees Copper building an airplane from parts purchased at the local Plane*Mart supermarket, while Fred constantly frets that the plane might crash. In the end his fears turn out to be justified. In "Picnic" Copper and Fred take an aerial picnic in an airship, which Fred manages to sleep through. In "Mushroom Crossing" Copper and Fred cross a canyon, but Fred ends up falling into the canyon and finding himself with talking mushrooms, who let him back out of the canyon after yelling at him.

== Print compilation ==
January 2010 saw the publication of Copper in book form, containing all of the existing pages as well Kibuishi's short stories for Flight and a step-by-step examination of Kibuishi's creation process.

== Reception ==
Copper was named one of the best webcomics of 2004 by The Webcomics Examiner, Joe Zabel describing it as "one of the most impressive achievements in webcomics" despite its low number of pages. The webcomic was nominated for an Eisner Award for Best Digital Comic 2006. Rating Copper a 9 out of 10, Jiffy Burke of Sequential Tart stated that "each of the full-page, full-color vignettes revealed in Copper are stand-alone wonders of imagination." Burke compared its art to that of Jhonen Vasquez and Bill Watterson, and said that Copper's art is "consistently amazing and has unique personality".
