= Salamander Dream =

Hope Larson's first graphic novel

- Cover
- Author(s): Hope Larson
- Website: Secret Friend Society (archived)
- Current status/schedule: Concluded
- Launch date: February 2, 2005
- End date: July 28, 2005

Salamander Dream (ISBN 0-9721794-9-6) is an original graphic novel by Hope Larson, her first, released by AdHouse Books in 2005. The story about a young girl and a magical salamander was inspired by Larson's youth playing in nature, and it was originally released as a webcomic.

== Synopsis ==
The book covers the relationship between Hailey, a young girl, and Salamander, a magical forest-dwelling being. The character Hailey lives on the edge of a small city, frequently walking with her magical friend through the forest next to her house, listening to his stories. As Hailey grows older, her interests slowly shifts away and she eventually ceases to visit the woods. Years later, Hailey visits the woods one last time and meets Salamander again. The girl shares a story with him, before bidding farewell and moving away.

== Development ==
Larson spent a lot of time playing around a creek as a child, imagining a "king of the salamanders" living in an underground palace with quartz walls. The original working title of Salamander Dream was "Salamander King", and Larson paid close attention to detail in how she presented nature in the comic, spotlighting specific species of plants, insects, and birds that she had encountered throughout her life.

Larson came into contact with Kean Soo in 2004 after she moved to Toronto. Soo was just planning to create Jellaby, and the two realized that their two story concepts were very similar. Larson and Soo launched the website Secret Friend Society at the start of 2005, with the goal of attracting attention from publishers. Here, Soo began posting Jellaby and Larson began posting Salamander Dream as webcomics, though Larson got contacted by Chris Pitzer of AdHouse Books quickly. Salamander Dream was published in print by AdHouse Books on September 14, 2005, as Larson's first full-length graphic novel.

== Reception ==
Jonathan H. Liu of Wired recommended the book, in particular for children at elementary age up through the American middle grades.

Salamander Dream was named as one of the best webcomics of 2005 by both Publishers Weekly and The Webcomics Examiner. The latter praised Salamander Dream in particular for how it "captures the energy and loneliness of growing up ... while presenting a hopeful picture of a grown-up world as full of magic as any child's imagination," all with minimal usage of dialog.
