= The Cloud Searchers =

2010 fantasy graphic novel by Kazu Kibuishi

- Cover art by Kazu Kibuishi
- Author: Kazu Kibuishi
- Cover artist: Kazu Kibuishi
- Language: English
- Series: Amulet
- Genre: Young adult Graphic Novel; Fantasy; Adventure
- Publisher: Graphix
- Publication date: September 1, 2010
- Publication place: United States
- Pages: 203
- ISBN: 0-545-20885-8
- Preceded by: The Stonekeeper's Curse
- Followed by: The Last Council

The Cloud Searchers is a fantasy graphic novel which was written in 2010. It is the third volume in the Amulet series. It was written and drawn by author Kazu Kibuishi.

== Plot ==
The Elf King, believing that Emily is too dangerous to be left alone, sends Gabilan, an assassin to hunt her down. At the same time, elf soldiers continue to hunt down Trellis, who is continuing his quest to recruit Emily.

Meanwhile, Trellis finds Luger in a cave, who has become weak and crippled due to using the amulet too much in The Stonekeeper's Curse. Trellis, instead of getting revenge and finishing him off instead takes pity on him and they begin to travel together. Trellis notices that Luger is surprisingly gentle and polite compared to how he was in Book 2.

As Trellis and Luger continue to travel, Emily, her mother and Navin look for leaves to help the robot Cogsley to cover up their robotic house. Emily, who noticed that the humanoid fox Leon was missing, finds him in her great grandfather Silas's study. He explains to her that they are heading to Cielis, despite the fact that it was destroyed by elves long ago. Cielis was a city where stonekeepers would be trained to control and use their amulet's power. These stonekeepers would be part of the Guardian Council, a group of leaders that would rule Alledia. But ever since The Elf King took over, he has been ruling Alledia with unfair rules, and so Leon and his crew's plan would be to seek help from the Guardian Council. Leon mentions that some people have claimed to have seen Cielis among the clouds in the sky.

The crew goes to a nearby city, and arrives at a bar to hire an airship crew so they can look for Cielis. They find two humanoid cats, Enzo and Rico, who claim to have seen Cielis in the sky, but elves enter the bar searching for their wanted prisoners. The crew believes they are after Emily and try to hide her, but they find out the prisoners are Trellis and Luger, whom elves from outside of the bar have already found. Emily, remembering how Trellis wanted her to join him to kill the Elf King, decides to save him, and attacks the other elves with her amulet.

They head to where Enzo and Rico's airship is docked with the elves in pursuit, and are able to escape in it. Navin offers to fly the ship due to his experience with the robotic house, but Enzo rejects the offer, thinking him to be too young, yet later on in the book he flies it through a storm while the automatic pilot robot is knocked out.

As the ship continues to fly, Leon begins teaching Emily how to defend with the Amulet rather than attack. When Trellis uses his amulet to wrap energy around Emily's mother, Emily, thinking that he was trying to attack her, shoots a blast of energy at him, but finds out that he was really protecting her from a wyvern (A type of bird in the Amulet series). The wyvern damages the ship's wings, but Cogsley and Miskit fix it, but are swept off the ship in doing so, much to Emily's depression.

Later, Emily asks Trellis why he wants to kill his father (The Elf King). He explains that when he was growing up, he was raised by his uncle. Once he decided to spy on what happened in his father's room, and saw his father wearing a mask to hide the fact that he is dead. In that very moment, he found out that his father was being possessed by someone or something.

The crew arrives at an island floating in the sky, where they have to solve a pattern of stones which are being held in midair due to the power of an amulet's energy. After doing so, the elf sent by The Elf King attacks them, but Emily and Trellis work together to defeat him. Three mysterious people appear, one of them a teen stonekeeper named Max Griffin. The book ends with Max telling Emily that she will be tested by the Guardian Council to see if she will be worthy enough to be part of them, and are brought to the cloud-surrounded floating city of Cielis.

== Title ==
The Cloud Searchers was the name for volume 3, as referring to the crew on Enzo and Rico's ship.
