= Paul Hornschemeier =

American artist, author and director (born 1977)

- Born: October 27, 1977 (age 48); Cincinnati, Ohio
- Education: Ohio State University
- Occupations: Director and Cartoonist
- Relatives: Ann Hornschemeier, sister
- Writing career
- Genre: Comics
- Subjects: Philosophy, Psychology, Family
- Notable works: Mother, Come Home; The Three Paradoxes; Life with Mr. Dangerous
- Website: forlornfunnies.com

Paul Hornschemeier (born October 27, 1977) is an artist, author, and director.

== Biography ==
Hornschemeier was born in Cincinnati, Ohio, in 1977 and raised in nearby rural Georgetown, Ohio. As a child he liked to draw, and after discovering his first Steve Ditko Spider-Man comic, he began creating his own comic books.

== Bibliography ==
Year	Title	Publisher
2004	Mother, Come Home	Dark Horse Comics
2004	The Collected Sequential	AdHouse Books
2004	Return of The Elephant	AdHouse Books
2006	Let Us Be Perfectly Clear	Fantagraphics Books
2007	The Three Paradoxes	Fantagraphics Books
2009	All and Sundry	Fantagraphics Books
2011	Life with Mr. Dangerous	Villard
2013	Bygone no.1	Margo Mitchell Media
2013	Author, Artists, Thinkers, Directors	Fantagraphics Books

== Filmography ==
Year	Title	Role	Notes
2009	Comedy Bang! Bang! title sequence	Concept Artist	Seasons 1-4
2012	“Walking to Work,” Comedy Bang! Bang!	Concept Artist, Title Sequence Director	Sketch
2014	Daniel in the Factory	Writer, Director	Short Film
2014	Forlorn TV (12 episodes)	Director, Animator	Youtube Series
2016	The Brutalist	Writer, Director	Short Film
2017	The Burden	Writer, Director	Short Film
2019	Twelve Forever	Art Director	Season 1
2023	Captain Fall	Art Director	Season 1
(in production)	Giant Sloth	Writer, Director	Short Film

== Awards and nominations ==
- 2004 (nomination) Eisner Award for Best Limited Series, Best Writer/Artist, and Best Coloring (Forlorn Funnies)
- 2007 Romics Awards – Best American graphic novel (Mother, Come Home)
