= Darkroom: A Memoir in Black and White =

Autobiographical comic by Lila Quintero Weaver

- Page count: 254 pages
- Publisher: University of Alabama Press

Original publication
- Published in: 03/01/2012
- Issues: 1
- Language: English
- ISBN: 9780817357146

Darkroom: A Memoir in Black and White is an autobiographical comic set during the civil rights movement written by American author Lila Quintero Weaver published on March 31, 2012. The graphic novel explores issues of immigrant identity through the author's childhood experiences during the time of desegregation.

== Overview ==
Weaver was inspired to title her memoir Darkroom from her childhood memories of watching her photographer father work.

In 1961, Weaver immigrates with her family from Buenos Aires to live in Marion, Alabama. The comic book describes her experience growing up as a Latina immigrant during the integration period immediately following the outlawing of Jim Crow laws in the Southern United States. She describes her feelings about growing up in a town with strong racial tension in which she didn't know where exactly she belonged and about her personal fight against the racial discrimination surrounding her. She also recounts her personal account of the night of the Jimmie Lee Jackson murder, which took place near her home. The graphic novel analyzes the connections between race, identity, immigration, and growing up in the United States.

== Themes ==
=== Racial Identity ===
Weaver’s migration to America, was profoundly affected by the Civil Rights movement and its relationship to her own racial identity. As an Argentinean immigrant, Weaver's social position as a Latina within the rigid dynamics of the racial landscape of the South was ambiguous; while she was not Black, and as such was not subject to Jim Crow laws, she was never really seen as completely "White", even though she could often times socially pass, due to her Latina heritage and Spanish speaking family and still experienced racism, albeit differently than Black community members. These interactions and the fluidity of the perception of her identity, and the struggle of community acceptance and self identity is the core of the graphic novel. Through personal experiences, she highlights the ways in which race intersects with other aspects of identity, such as class, nationality, and language.

== Reception ==
This graphic novel has been the center of much academic discussion, some scholars reference a belief that Darkroom is a metaphor for how some are socially blind.Weaver was nominated for the 2012 Ignatz Award for Promising New Talent for Darkroom.

== See also ==
- Civil rights movement in popular culture
- American Born Chinese
- The Four Immigrants Manga
- The Arab of the Future
