= Ann Hornschemeier =

American astronomer

Ann Hornschemeier is an American astronomer specializing in X-ray emission from X-ray binary populations. She is the Chief Scientist for the Physics of the Cosmos program at NASA.

== Career and research ==
She chairs the NuSTAR Starburst and Local Group science working group, which observes seven nearby galaxies and uses high-energy X-rays to search for and take pictures of the densest, hottest and most energetic regions in the universe. At NASA, Hornschemeier researches high energy astrophysics and cosmology. She is involved in future research missions, including the ESA Athena mission due to launch in 2028. Hornschemeier is also an adjunct faculty member at Johns Hopkins University.

Hornschemeier specializes in studies of x-ray emission from x-ray binary populations, both in the local universe and at cosmologically interesting distances (z > 0.1). This work is carried out using surveys by space-based x-ray, UV and infrared observatories, alongside ground-based telescopes. She is also the Chief Scientist for the Physics of the Cosmos (PCOS) programme, NASA's high energy astrophysics and cosmology programme, and is also heavily involved in future missions as a research scientist at NASA, including co-chairing a science panel for the ESA Athena mission due for launch in 2028.

Hornschemeier is heavily involved in future missions, serving as the NASA Deputy Study Scientist for the Laser Interferometer Space Antenna (LISA) mission, a space-based gravitational wave mission led by the European Space Agency. She works with the Study Scientist and NASA HQ on NASA's scientific and technical contributions to LISA.

== Education ==
Hornschemeier gained a Ph.D. in Astronomy and Astrophysics in 2002 from Pennsylvania State University; she has a Master of Science in astronomy in Astrophysics also from Pennsylvania State University. She graduated from her Bachelor of Science in physics and mathematics magna cum laude, from Drake University (Des Moines, Iowa).

== Awards and honors ==
In 2007, she won the American Astronomical Society's Annie Jump Cannon Award, which recognizes women for their outstanding research in astronomy, for her X-ray investigations of distant galaxies. NASA awarded her the Early Career Achievement Medal in 2012, recognising outstanding early career achievement in science, leadership and service. In 2016, she was elected Fellow of the American Physical Society.

== Family ==
Hornschemeier's brother is the artist, author, and director Paul Hornschemeier.
