= Delilah Dirk =

Graphic novel series

- Cover of the second graphic novel, Delilah Dirk and the King's Shilling.
- Author: Tony Cliff
- Website: http://www.delilahdirk.com/

Delilah Dirk is a series of action-adventure graphic novels by writer and illustrator Tony Cliff. Set in the early 19th century, the series follows Delilah Dirk, an adventurous and skilled sword fighter who travels widely and becomes involved in various conflicts. She is often accompanied by Erdemoglu Selim, a Turkish lieutenant who favors peaceful solutions and has a fondness for tea. Each volume has also been released online in webcomic form, with the fourth currently in progress. The series' digital and webcomic editions have received five Eisner Award nominations, winning the Best Digital Comic award in 2026 for Practical Defence Against Piracy. The series comprises three published graphic novels, a fourth in progress, and several shorter stories.

== Background ==
Writer and illustrator Tony Cliff is a Canadian cartoonist and animator also known for his contributions to the Flight anthology series. He started working on Delilah Dirk as a 30-page comic inspired by the Napoleonic Wars, Indiana Jones, and James Bond. Cliff combined this initial comic with a short story from the Flight anthology with another hundred pages to create the first complete published story, Delilah Dirk and the Turkish Lieutenant.

Cliff has also cited Horatio Hornblower and the Sharpe series, as well as the histories of the Elgin Marbles and the Venus de Milo as inspirations. He describes himself as "enthusiastic for historical elements" but adds that "if I feel like some historical accuracy is putting a speed bump in an otherwise smooth story, I'd like to think I'd favor the story over the accuracy". He has also stated that part of the inspiration for the series was to contrast with the humorless depiction of women in late '90s superhero comics.

== Works ==
=== Graphic novels ===
Delilah Dirk and the Turkish Lieutenant (2013) The first graphic novel follows Delilah Dirk and Turkish lieutenant Selim, who form a comradely partnership after her imprisonment in 1807 Istanbul. Selim recording her story and later joining her out of loyalty and survival, with their bond cemented through shared danger, battle, and tea. Elements of earlier short stories were expanded into this volume.

Delilah Dirk and the King's Shilling (2016) Dirk and Selim are drawn into British political intrigue when they are wrongly accused of espionage and must clear their names. The book was originally tentatively titled Delilah Dirk and the Blades of England.

Delilah Dirk and the Pillars of Hercules (2018) Set in central Asia, this installment follows Dirk and Selim as they investigate claims relating to a supposed remnant of the mythic Pillars of Hercules.

=== Practical Defence Against Piracy ===
The fourth Delilah Dirk story is being serialized online chapter by chapter and remains in progress. Cliff has described it as a story "in which pirates force young Delilah to celebrate her birthday away from home, among many other wretched crimes", and has summarized it as set on a fictional Mediterranean island in the late 18th century. The webcomic won the 2026 Eisner Award for Best Digital Comic and was nominated in each of the three preceding years.

=== Shorter works ===
Several shorter Delilah Dirk stories were published prior to and between the graphic novels:

- Delilah Dirk and the Treasure of Constantinople (2007) – A 28-page story later expanded into the opening chapter of The Turkish Lieutenant.
- Delilah Dirk and the Aqueduct (2008) – Published in Flight Volume 5; later incorporated into The Turkish Lieutenant.
- Delilah Dirk and the Seeds of Good Fortune (2012) – A 36-page black-and-white story set between the first and second graphic novels.
- Delilah Dirk and the Easy Mark (2013) – An 11-page short comic originally published online at Tor.com, featuring a parody in which Delilah Dirk is depicted as a cat.

== Publication history ==
Delilah Dirk and the Turkish Lieutenant was first published online, starting on May 28, 2011. By December 2011 it was in its fourth chapter and it was fully published online by February 2012. Tony Cliff stated that had always intended The Turkish Lieutenant to become a printed graphic novel, and he serialized the book online to gauge public interest. Delilah Dirk first appeared in print in French, published by Éditions Akileos in 2011. An English print book, which added around a dozen pages to the web version and edited some of its text, was published by First Second Books in 2013. First Second Books has published the subsequent books as well.

The second book in the series, Delilah Dirk and the King's Shilling, was partially published online before the release of the book. The first 90 of the 160 pages were published online serially and for free before the book's release. Delilah Dirk and the Pillars of Hercules similarly had about 100 pages released online prior to the print publication of the entire story.

== Reception ==
The Turkish Lieutenant received broadly positive reviews. Writers for ComicsAlliance praised its "classic Disney" sensibility and maturity, noting that Tony Cliff's storytelling "keeps the action constantly moving" and that his depiction of body language and character expression is "excellent."

A reviewer for CBR.com called the book "a charming story," highlighting the convincing friendship between Delilah Dirk and Selim as well as Cliff's blend of humor and insight. Additional positive commentary came from Boing Boing, io9, and Wired.

== Accolades ==
Delilah Dirk and the Turkish Lieutenant appeared on the New York Times bestseller list in 2013 and was included on several year-end lists, including Publishers Weekly Best Children's Books and Kirkus Reviews Best Teen Books of the year.

== Awards and nominations ==
The series and its webcomic installments have received multiple award nominations, including recognition from the Eisner, Shuster, and Harvey Awards. In 2026, Practical Defence Against Piracy won the Eisner Award for Best Digital Comic.

Year	Work	Award	Category	Result	Ref
2012	Delilah Dirk and the Turkish Lieutenant	Eisner Award	Best Digital Comic	Nominated	
2012	Delilah Dirk and the Turkish Lieutenant	Joe Shuster Award	Outstanding Webcomics Creator	Nominated	
2012	Delilah Dirk and the Turkish Lieutenant	Harvey Award	Best Online Comics Work	Nominated	
2023	Practical Defence Against Piracy	Eisner Award	Best Webcomic	Nominated	
2024	Practical Defence Against Piracy	Eisner Award	Best Digital Comic	Nominated	
2025	Practical Defence Against Piracy	Eisner Award	Best Webcomic	Nominated	
2026	Practical Defence Against Piracy	Eisner Award	Best Digital Comic	Won	

== Adaptations ==
In 2016, Walt Disney Pictures announced a live-action adaptation of Delilah Dirk and the Turkish Lieutenant, with Roy Lee attached as a producer.

In September 2025, CBR reported that Daisy Ridley was rumored to be in early talks to star as Delilah Dirk in the long-inactive project. The report noted that Disney had not issued any official confirmation, and no production timeline has been announced.
