= Goldie Vance =

Comic book series

- Cover of Goldie Vance: Volume One

Publication information
- Publisher: Boom! Studios (comics); Little, Brown Books (novels)
- Format: Ongoing series
- Genre: Young Adult, Mystery
- Publication date: April 2016 – May 2017 (ongoing); April 2018 – present (OGNs); March 2020 (novels)
- No. of issues: 12

Creative team
- Created by: Hope Larson; Brittney Williams
- Written by: Hope Larson; Jackie Ball; Lilliam Rivera (novels)
- Artist(s): Brittney Williams; Noah Hayes; Elle Power
- Colorist: Sarah Stern

Collected editions
- Vol. 1 (#1–4): ISBN 9781608868988
- Vol. 2 (#5–8): ISBN 9781608869749
- Vol. 3 (#9–12): ISBN 9781684150533
- Vol. 4 (OGN): ISBN 9781684151400
- The Hotel Whodunit: ISBN 9780316456647

Goldie Vance is a comic book series created by Eisner Award-winning writer Hope Larson and artist Brittney Williams. It was a monthly ongoing series from 2016 to 2017, then switched to a series of original graphic novels in 2018. In 2019, the comic's publisher, Boom! Studios, partnered with Little, Brown Books to continue Goldie Vance as a series of novels for young readers. The story follows Marigold "Goldie" Vance, a sixteen-year-old girl who dreams of becoming the in-house detective at the Miami resort where her father works as manager.

== Plot ==
=== Volume One ===
The first volume centers around Goldie searching a necklace reported missing by guest Dieter Lugwig, uncovering a plot to escape Russian agents and sell NASA a brand new formula for rocket fuel.

=== Volume Two ===
In the second volume, Goldie and Cheryl encounter a woman in an astronaut suit washed up on a beach. Cheryl and the woman vanish shortly thereafter, and Goldie tracks their trail leading to a mysterious rogue astronaut training program.

=== Volume Three ===
Sugar Maple, Goldie's longtime rival, recruits her to find out who is sabotaging her prize race car before the big race she'll be competing in.

=== Volume Four ===
Bands are missing and need to be found before the town's big music festival.

== Characters ==
- Marigold "Goldie" Vance: The sixteen-year-old protagonist of the series. Goldie is a car valet at the Crossed Palms Resort who volunteers her services as its detective. She is skilled in discovering clues, driving and repairing cars, disguises, making friends, and breaking rules.
- Cheryl Lebeaux: Goldie's best friend, who works at the front desk of the hotel. She is a bookworm and studying to become an astronaut.
- Walter Tooey: The hired detective at Crossed Palms. He is frequently exasperated by Goldie's hijacking of his job but grudgingly tolerates her for the results she gets.
- Arthur Vance: Goldie's father, and the manager of Crossed Palms. He is professional and seeks to keep the staff constantly busy.
- Sylvia Bell: A mermaid swimmer at the local club. She and Mr. Vance are divorced. It is unclear if she has kept her married name or returned to her maiden name after her divorce from Goldie's father.
- Rob: Another valet at the hotel. He is frequently nervous and desperate and has shown to have a crush on Cheryl.
- Diane: A record seller at Wax Lips Records & Goldie's girlfriend after helping her on the necklace case.
- Sugar Maple: The daughter of Mr. Maple, the owner of Crossed Palms. She is rich, a competitive racer, and very hot-tempered. She and Goldie have been bitter rivals ever since they were children. But they were friends once before Goldie won a race and Sugar Maple decided she did not want to be friends with Goldie

== Collected Editions ==
Title	Release date	Format	Story	Art	Colors	Cover	ISBN
Goldie Vance: Volume One	October 5, 2016	Comic trade paperback COLLECTS: Goldie Vance #1–4	Hope Larson	Brittney Williams	Sarah Stern	Brittney Williams	9781608868988
Goldie Vance: Volume Two	May 3, 2017	Comic trade paperback COLLECTS: Goldie Vance #5–8	Hope Larson	Brittney Williams	Sarah Stern	Brittney Williams	9781608869749
Goldie Vance: Volume Three	November 15, 2017	Comic trade paperback COLLECTS: Goldie Vance #9–12	Hope Larson; Jackie Ball	Noah Hayes	Sarah Stern	Brittney Williams	9781684150533
Goldie Vance: Volume Four	May 1, 2018	Paperback graphic novel	Hope Larson; Jackie Ball	Elle Power	Sarah Stern	Brittney Williams	9781684151400
Goldie Vance: Larceny in La La Land	August 4, 2020	Paperback graphic novel	Jackie Ball	Mollie Rose	Natalia Nesterenko	Brittney Williams	9781684155446
Goldie Vance: The Hotel Whodunit	March 17, 2020	Illustrated prose novel	Lilliam Rivera	Elle Power	TBD	Brittney Williams	9780316456647
Goldie Vance: The Hocus-Pocus Hoax	January 5, 2021	Illustrated prose novel	Lilliam Rivera		TBD		9780316427593

== Film ==
Simpson Street for 20th Century Studios will produce a movie based on the comic. Rashida Jones will write and direct the movie, while Kerry Washington will produce it.
