= Homebody (graphic novel) =

2024 graphic memoir by Theo Parish

- Date: April 23, 2024
- Publisher: HarperAlley

Creative team
- Creator: Theo Parish
- ISBN: 978-0063319585

Homebody is a 2024 graphic memoir by Theo Parish. It focuses on Parish's journey to realizing and embracing their identity as a non-binary person.

== Synopsis ==
The book is largely told through vignettes about Parish's life, focusing on the various experiences that lead them to learn about what being non-binary was and eventually come out as such. The book frequently uses the theme of a home to symbolize Parish's relationship to their body, with Parish being symbolically shown with a house in the place of their torso to represent them feeling at home with themself and their gender expression.

== Reception ==
Publishers Weekly gave Homebody a starred review, describing it as a "deeply relatable exploration of finding oneself and of giving oneself grace when the journey takes longer." Of the art, they stated "cleanly lined illustrations in a muted color palette reinforce Parish’s remembrances by giving the novel a hazy quality." Kirkus Reviews called the book "an accessible, affirming story that models how anyone—cis or trans—can take steps toward self-knowledge and gender freedom." Publishers Weekly and Kirkus Reviews both compared the book to Gender Queer by Maia Kobabe, another graphic memoir centering on the author’s non-binary identity.

Homebody was also positively received by Emily Yates of School Library Journal, who said "the portrayal of gender identity as a journey with no set destination is affirming and reassuring, and this hopeful tone will appeal to teens," Meg Cornell of The Bulletin of the Center for Children's Books, and Emily Koch of BookPage, who compared the book's tone and artwork to the webcomic Heartstopper, while stating the book was "exceptional in its own way as a nonfiction offering."

=== Accolades ===
| Year | Award/honor | Result | Reference |
|---|---|---|---|
| 2024 | Cybils Award for Graphic Novel | Shortlisted | |
| 2024 | Harvey Award for Best Young Adult Book | Shortlisted | |
| 2025 | Audie Award for Young Adult Title | Shortlisted | |
| 2025 | Carnegie Medal for Illustration | Shortlisted | |
| 2025 | Shadowers' Choice Award for Illustration | Won | |
| 2025 | Quick Picks for Reluctant Young Adult Readers | Top Ten | |
| 2025 | YALSA Award for Excellence in Nonfiction | Shortlisted | |
