= AdHouse Books =

American independent comic book publisher

- Founded: 2002
- Founder: Chris Pitzer
- Country of origin: United States
- Headquarters location: Richmond, Virginia
- Distribution: Diamond Book Distributors (books)
- Publication types: Graphic novels, comic books
- Official website: www.adhousebooks.com

AdHouse Books was an independent comic book publisher in the United States. Based in Richmond, Virginia, it was founded in 2002 by graphic designer Chris Pitzer.

AdHouse was known primarily as a publisher of graphic novels, beginning with 2002's Pulpatoon: Pilgrimage, traditional comic book series, and art books, including James Jean's Process Recess;

The company announced on July 14, 2021, that it would cease publications after its 101st book. The company would then take 2022 to visit as many shows, conventions, festivals, etc., as they could. Among the reasons, Pitzer mentioned his older age, as well as "low sales on recent releases, uneasiness about the crowdfunding model, and the lack of conventions due to the COVID-19 pandemic."

== Graphic novels and single issue comics ==
- Superior Showcase (2005 - 2008) anthology, by Dean Trippe, Nick Bertozzi, Mike Dawson, and Hope Larson (4 issues)
- Zig Zag (2005–2007) by J. Chris Campbell (2 issues)
- Project: Romantic (2006) Anthology, edited by Chris Pitzer
- Bumperboy and the Loud, Loud Mountain (2006) by Debbie Huey
- Noble Boy (2006) by Scott Morse, published by Red Window and distributed by AdHouse Books
- The Preposterous Adventures of IronHide Tom (2006) by Joel Priddy
- Project: Superior (2005) Anthology, edited by Chris Pitzer, Dean Haspiel and Scott Morse
- Mort Grim (2005) by Doug Fraser
- Bumperboy Loses His Marbles (2005) by Debbie Huey, distributed by AdHouse Books
- Salamander Dream (2005) by Hope Larson
- The Secret Voice (2005) by Zack Soto (1 issue)
- The Collected Sequential (2004) by Paul Hornschemeier
- Return of the Elephant (2004) by Paul Hornschemeier
- One Step After Another (2004) by Fermin Solis
- FREE Comic Book Day Comic Book 2004 (2004) by Scott Morse, Joel Priddy, and Chris Pitzer
- Southpaw (2004) by Scott Morse
- Monkey & Spoon (2004) by Simone Lia
- Project: Telstar (2004) Anthology, edited by Chris Pitzer
- Skyscrapers of the Midwest (2004) by Joshua W. Cotter (4 issues)
- My Own Little Empire (2003) by Scott Mills
- Pulpatoon Pilgrimage (2002) by Joel Priddy

== Art books ==
- Blue Collar / White Collar by Sterling Hundley
- Pink, Vol. 1: GRRR! (2004) by Scott Morse
- Process Recess (2005) by James Jean
- Process Recess 2: Portfolio (2007) by James Jean
- Process Recess 3 (2009) by James Jean

== Awards ==
In 2004, AdHouse's Project: Telstar received Domtar Paper's Kudos Award for Excellence. The anthology was also nominated for several other awards, including Best Anthology and Special Award for Excellence in Presentation by the Harvey Awards, and Best Anthology and Best Publication Design by the Eisner Awards.

AdHouse's first publication, Pulpatoon Pilgrimage, won the 2002 Small Press Expo Ignatz Award for Outstanding Debut and the 2002 Ninth Art Lighthouse Award for Debut Book, and was nominated for a 2003 Eisner Award for Best Graphic Novel.
