= The Stonekeeper =

2008 graphic novel by Kazu Kibuishi

- Cover art by Kazu Kibuishi
- Author: Kazu Kibuishi
- Cover artist: Kazu Kibuishi
- Language: English
- Series: Amulet
- Genre: Young adult Graphic novel Science fiction Horror
- Publisher: Graphix
- Publication date: Jan. 1 2008
- Publication place: United States
- Media type: Print (paperback)
- Pages: 192
- ISBN: 0-439-84681-1
- Followed by: The Stonekeeper's Curse

Amulet: The Stonekeeper is a 2008 children's graphic novel written and illustrated by Kazu Kibuishi. The book concerns the adventures of Emily Hayes, who must try to rescue her kidnapped mother with the assistance of her younger brother Navin and helper robots such as Miskit. It is the first book in the Amulet graphic novel series.

== Plot ==
Two years after a car accident that killed her husband, Karen has difficulties as a single mother. She and her children, Emily and Navin, move to the old house of Karen's grandfather Silas near San Francisco. Karen says Silas was a "puzzle maker" who disappeared after locking himself in the house. While exploring Silas's library, Emily finds a stone amulet that had been hidden in a table, and Navin helps tie it around her neck. The amulet begins speaking to Emily in her thoughts, giving suggestions beginning that night.

The amulet tells Emily that her family is in danger. A noise from the basement awakens the family from where they have sleeping on the floor of the house until it can further be renovated, and as they enter to investigate, Karen is kidnapped by a large beetle-like monster with tentacles. The children go downstairs to look, but when they reach the bottom of the stairs they are trapped in a different world and are confronted by the monster that swallowed their mother. The monster grabs the two children and swallows Navin, but with the amulet's assistance Emily is able to break free, and Karen is able to push Navin out of a hole in the creature's side.

As the children hide from the monster, the amulet tells Emily that to save their mother they must find the house where Silas lives. It gives her clear directions but as they try to follow them, the monster runs after the children. The amulet then helps them escape.

Now deep underground, the children see a house on a column of rock surrounded by water, at the bottom of an enormous hole overhead leading to the surface. An elf with an amulet like Emily's tries to attack them, but a large humanoid uses a ray gun to stun the elf and then rows the children across the water to Silas's house. They discover their rescuer is Silas's assistant, and is a small rabbit-like robot named Miskit who had been controlling a large humanoid robot. The children find Silas on his deathbed. Silas says to Emily the amulet has great power and can allow her to rule the land of Alledia, and even has the power to turn back time, making Emily think of when her dad was alive and the possibility that she can use the Amulet to bring her dad back. Lastly, Silas tells Emily she must either accept or reject the amulet's power. He then passes away.

After Silas dies, the lights turn off and the amulet glows and tells Emily to become the new stonekeeper and accept its power, which she does against Navin's wishes. The robots place Silas in a "sleep chamber" and locate Karen with a computer that shows them where the monster, an Arachnopod, currently is.

The children and Miskit board a flying vehicle to reach Karen. They struggle to pass through a tunnel with walls lined with tentacled monsters and then see several Arachnopods. One in the pack of Arachnopods is the one carrying their mother. The heroes are unable to rescue her before their vehicle crash lands.

As Emily goes after the beast, the elf they saw earlier uses his amulet to destroy the Arachnopod and holds Emily's mother captive. The elf then captures Emily with his power, demanding that she help kill his father the Elf King. With her amulet, Emily repels the elf. Then her own amulet tells her to kill the elf, but Emily refuses, instead telling the elf to never come near her family again. The elf leaves; Navin and Miskit catch up with Emily and they take Karen back to Silas's house.

Silas's old helper robots determine that Karen was poisoned by the Arachnopod and needs an antidote, but the nearest city is 300 miles away. To take her to the city as soon as possible, the robots cause the entire house to be transformed into a giant robot. The giant robot, with everyone inside, walks through the water surrounding Silas's house, climbs out of the hole to the surface and starts walking across the landscape to the city, leading them to the antidote.

== Reception ==
The book received mostly positive reviews. Upon the book's release, Booklist stated that the "action-packed adventure sequences move at an exciting clip," but that there were "dark elements in the tale." Kirkus Reviews found the author "a dab hand at portraying freaky monsters." In 2013, a reviewer for The Guardian "couldn't stop reading it."

On the other hand, one reviewer for School Library Journal felt a "sense of déjà vu in some scenes" and concluded that the book was "serviceable, but not extraordinary." Another School Library Journal review of the first three books in the Amulet series opined that the storyline was "a little too drawn out and chaotic."

Among other recognition, a 2008 article in Book Links listed it as one of 26 "high-quality graphic novels … [for] elementary-school students." The Young Adult Library Services Association named it one of its "2009 Best Books for Young Adults." In 2010 it won a Rhode Island Children's Book Award and was included in a Library Journal list of 33 "Graphic Novels for Reluctant Readers." In 2011 it received a Young Reader's Choice Award in the Junior Division from the Pacific Northwest Library Association and an Oregon Reader's Choice Award in the Junior Division from the Oregon Library Association. As of 2013, it ranked fourth on a list of "Best Graphic Novels for Children" on Goodreads.
