= The Stonekeeper's Curse =

Fantasy comic by Kazu Kibuishi

- Cover art by Kazu Kibuishi
- Author: Kazu Kibuishi
- Cover artist: Kazu Kibuishi
- Language: English
- Series: Amulet
- Genre: Graphic novel Science fiction
- Publisher: Graphix
- Publication date: Sep. 1 2009
- Publication place: United States
- Media type: Print (paperback)
- Pages: 224
- ISBN: 0-439-84683-8
- Preceded by: The Stonekeeper
- Followed by: The Cloud Searchers

The Stonekeeper's Curse is the second volume in the Amulet series. The fantasy comic is written by Kazu Kibuishi, and is a successful bestseller. It was written in 2009.

== Summary ==
Emily, her brother, and their crew of robots continue to travel in the underground world to the city of Kanalis to find an antidote for her mother. At the same time, the elf Trellis continues to hunt Emily down, due to her denial of agreeing to join him to fight his evil father, the Elf King. However, because his son did not bring Emily to him, the Elf King states that Trellis has failed him again. He forces Trellis to be accompanied by the Elf Luger, who like Trellis and Emily, is also a stonekeeper. While Emily mourns for her mother, the robot Cogsley is currently teaching Navin how to control the robotic house.

When the crew arrives at Kanalis, they find everyone in the city are humanoid animals. As they seek the town's doctor, elves begin to tighten their grip on Kanalis which puts the city under depression. At the city, they meet the humanoid fox Leon Redbeard who teaches Emily about the danger of her amulet. Additionally, he says how she must not let the amulet take control of her which is not so easy as its influence over her is strong. Leon also offers to be Emily's bodyguard but is rejected by the robot Miskit, despite Emily thinking it's a good idea.

When the elves shoot a cannon on the hospital the crew is in, everyone in the building is evacuated to a train, except for Emily, Leon, and Miskit, who begins to dislike Leon. Leon leads them underground towards Demon Mountain, as a doctor claimed that magical fruit which could cure Emily's mother grows on top of the mountain. Many people, including elves, who have attempted this quest have never come back.

Soon they are encountered once again by elves. Leon is able to protect Emily for a bit but almost dies in doing so. Emily saves him with her magical amulet, astonishing Leon, the elves and Miskit.

At the same time, elves invade the robotic house, and the robots have no choice but to shut themselves down so the elves don't collect data from them. Meanwhile, the humanoid bull Balin shows Navin a future-telling talking tree, and he rushes to Demon Mountain due to one of the tree's visions of Emily falling to her death. Meanwhile, while climbing the mountain, Leon shows Emily how to focus her amulet's power with a walking stick. He begins by showing her how to pick up a nut with her amulet without burning it. After mastering this, she moves a bunch of explosives that were in their way. At the same time, the sinister voice of her amulet is growing stronger and almost makes her injure Leon and leave Miskit.

Navin, with the help of Balin and a crew called the Resistance, are able to turn on the robots again, who begin to travel to Demon Mountain in the robotic house. Emily asks Leon what happens to a stonekeeper when the voice completely takes over their body. He explains that years before, four stonekeepers lost control of their powers. They grew into giants and would have destroyed them all had they not been defeated by other stonekeepers, her great-grandfather among them. They were able to kill all but one of the rogue stonekeepers. That one was an elf and was sent to jail, separated from his amulet in an attempt to break his curse. The elf kept begging them to kill him, and warned that dark days would come. One day, the elf's amulet returned to him so he could break out of prison, and he caused an explosion which killed many, including a prison guard that was Leon's father. That elf grew up to be The Elf King. Eventually, Emily, Leon and Miskit reach the top of the mountain, where they find future-telling talking trees, the trees that grow the fruit they are looking for. The trees explain that whoever came to the mountain would die because they chose the wrong fruit to eat. Using the amulet's power, she finds the fruit that isn't deadly and heads down the mountain.

While the elves travel through Demon Mountain, Luger injures Trellis, believing that he would stand to get in their way and seeing him as useless. After burning down the future-telling trees, the elves fight Leon and Emily. Trellis, who woke from his coma, tries to stop Luger from killing Emily, but with the power of his amulet, Luger grows into a giant, knocking Trellis out, and knocks Emily and Leon into a chasm, but they are saved by the robotic house. Navin tries to use the house to fight Luger, who almost destroys the house, but Emily gives the house extreme power while Navin controls the house to punch Luger two times. The second punch is strong enough to send Luger into the chasm, Emily's mother is cured and Trellis follows the house, still planning to recruit Emily as the crew continues to try and stop The Elf King.

== Themes ==
Themes of The Stonekeeper's Curse includes resisting a greedy temptation, as shown when the Amulet almost gets full control over Emily.

== Title ==
The book was named The Stonekeeper's Curse because of the scene when Leon was explaining to Emily about what would happen if the Voice took full control.
