= Minus (webcomic) =

2006–2008 webcomic by Ryan Armand

minus
- Panel from minus #15
- Author: Ryan Armand
- Website: https://kiwisbybeat.com/minus.html (archived)
- Current status/schedule: Ended
- Launch date: February 9, 2006
- End date: July 3, 2008
- Genre: Fantasy humour

minus is a webcomic created by Ryan Armand that ran from February 2006 to July 2008. It was a member of Koala Wallop, a webcomic collective that also included Dresden Codak and Rice Boy. It was nominated for an Eisner Award in 2007 in the category of Best Digital Comic. New strips were usually released weekly on Thursdays. Many of the strips are standalone stories, though several follow a longer story or theme over the course of several weeks.

The original website that hosted the webcomic went offline in 2016. It is currently a spam advertising website.

A fan-run archival project to restore the webcomic is now on this URL: https://kiwisbybeat.net/

== Conception ==
minus is a large-format colour strip, drawn and painted on 15x20" illustration boards. On the strip's Web page, Armand states that he imagined minus as "a comic strip for a newspaper in the early 20th century", in reference to both the art style and amount of space given (far greater than the usual three or four panel layout of most newspaper strips). He has cited the works of Shigeru Mizuki and Winsor McCay's Little Nemo as stylistic influences, referring to the latter as "a playground for bizarre ideas which are ends in themselves"; a similar approach to storytelling is used in the minus comic strips. He also cites John Steinbeck's Cannery Row and the films of Takeshi Kitano as other examples of stories that eschew straightforward plot development and conflict and focus just on characters and the small events that happen to them.

Other webcomics Armand has created include Ribald Youth, Great, Modern Fried Snake, Socks, and The Mildly Inconvenient Journey of Pelen Purul.

== Content ==
The comic follows the adventures of minus (always uncapitalized), a young girl supernaturally able to change her environment, from time-travel to her own form. minus is otherwise a typical child: fairly amiable, excitable, impulsive, and only vaguely aware that other people feel pain. Consequently, the comic ranges from flights of fancy to moments of surreal horror. In various strips minus has climbed into paintings and chalk drawings, brought inanimate objects to life, talked to ghosts, killed out of spite, turned a library into a pirate ship, become the ruler of a colony of ants, swum with mermaids in her bathtub and pulled the plug when she was done, and caused various other fantastical situations. minus's parents are never seen, but they are sometimes overheard issuing disciplinary commands toward her from off-panel, seemingly the only force that minus cannot fully defy.

Between capers minus is a quiet child, or at least lonely. Her only conventionally real friend is a green-haired girl from school. minus speaks when spoken to but is content to doodle or wander by herself, often up or down vertical inclines. The webcomic itself wanders into and out of short plotlines as minus gets ideas or loses interest.

== Reception ==
Dan Head of Paperback Reader listed minus as a "comic you should be reading," praising the webcomic for being "beautiful and simple," and saying that it "successfully captures the spirit of innocence that is the special property of children everywhere." minus was nominated for an Eisner Award in the "Best Digital Comic" category in 2007. The jury of the Japan Media Arts Festival recommended the webcomic "for extra recognition" in 2007 as well.
