= Brittney Williams =

Character designer and cartoonist

- Born: Brittney LaDawn Williams
- Area: Artist
- Notable works: Patsy Walker; Goldie Vance

Brittney LaDawn Williams is an American character designer and comic artist. She has worked on comics such as Patsy Walker, A.K.A. Hellcat! with Kate Leth and Goldie Vance with Hope Larson. She has also done character design for DC Super Hero Girls.

== Biography ==
Brittney Williams graduated from South Carolina State University with a degree in Graphic Design.

== Bibliography ==
=== Archie Comics ===
- Betty & Veronica: The Bond of Friendship (artist)

=== Boom! Studios ===
- Goldie Vance (artist)
- Garfield (artist)
- Rugrats: R is for Reptar 2018 Special (artist)

=== DC Comics ===
- Shade, the Changing Girl (artist)
- Lois Lane and the Friendship Challenge (artist)

=== Dynamite Entertainment ===
- Rainbow Brite (artist)

=== Graphic India ===
- Stan Lee's Chakra The Invincible (artist)

=== IDW ===
- Samurai Jack (artist)
- Cartoon Network: Super Secret Crisis War!: Foster's Home for Imaginary Friends (artist)

=== Marvel Comics ===
- Patsy Walker, A.K.A. Hellcat! (artist)
- Secret Wars, Too (2015) #1 (artist)

== See also ==
- List of women in comics
