= Amulet (comics) =

Cartoon novel series

- Amulet boxed set of books 1–3
- The Stonekeeper (2008); The Stonekeeper's Curse (2009); The Cloud Searchers (2010); The Last Council (2011); Prince of the Elves (2012); Escape from Lucien (2014); Firelight (2016); Supernova (2018); Waverider (2024)
- Author: Kazu Kibuishi
- Original title: The Stonekeeper
- Illustrator: Kazu Kibuishi; Jason Caffoe
- Cover artist: Kazu Kibuishi
- Country: United States
- Language: English
- Genre: Adventure, Dark fantasy, Science fiction
- Publisher: Graphix
- Published: January 1, 2008 - February 6, 2024
- Media type: Graphic novel
- No. of books: 9

Amulet is a children's fantasy, adventure, graphic novel series written and illustrated by Kazu Kibuishi and published by Scholastic Corporation. Beginning in 2008 with The Stonekeeper, the series was published by Scholastic under their Graphix imprint. The nine-volume series has received critical acclaim for its storytelling and visuals, appealing to both young and older audiences, and has been featured on the New York Times bestseller list. A Netflix adaptation is in development.

== Premise ==
After moving into their great-grandfather's house, Emily and Navin Hayes discover a magical amulet. Emily learns she must use the amulet's power to protect the world of Alledia from the Elf King. As her powers grow, Emily faces difficult moral choices and the challenges of her new responsibilities.

== Book synopses ==
=== Book 1: The Stonekeeper ===
Following their father’s death, Emily, Navin, and their mother Karen moved into their great-grandfather's mysterious house. Emily discovers a powerful amulet. When Karen is attacked by a creature, Emily and Navin follow her into the world of Alledia. Aided by robots built by their great-grandfather, Emily embraces the amulet's power to rescue her mother. They encounter the elf Trellis, who attempts to control Emily but is driven back. The group seeks a cure for Karen's injuries.

=== Book 2: The Stonekeeper's Curse ===
Searching for a cure for Karen, the group travels to Kanalis, a city whose inhabitants are slowly transforming into animals. They meet Leon Redbeard, who guides them. Emily, Miskit, and Leon seek a cure on Demon's Head Mountain, while Navin joins the Resistance, a group fighting the Elf King. Emily confronts the elf Luger, and Navin arrives with reinforcements, defeating gigantic Luger. Karen is cured.

=== Book 3: The Cloud Searchers ===
Seeking the Council of Stonekeepers, the group hires pilots Enzo and Rico. They are joined by Trellis and Luger, who are now fugitives. They face attacks and challenges, eventually reaching a hidden temple. Gabilan, a memory-stealing assassin elf, attacks, revealing Trellis and Luger's sibling relationship. Emily defeats him, and a guide named Max leads them to Cielis.

=== Book 4: The Last Council ===
Emily is warned by the amulet's voice to avoid a certain hallway in Cielis. She and other young Stonekeepers undergo trials for a place on the Council. During a dangerous game, Emily discovers the Mother Stone, the source of all amulets' power. Max is revealed to be working with the Elf King and steals the stone.

=== Book 5: Prince of the Elves ===
Max's past is revealed, explaining his allegiance to the Elf King. He frees the buglike giant Chronos. Navin and the Resistance prepare for war against the elves. Trellis enters the void to change the past. Emily joins him, and they encounter Max. The Voice heals Max and compels him to continue his destructive path.

=== Book 6: Escape from Lucien ===
Max attacks the Resistance fleet, forcing Navin and others to flee to Lucien. They face shadows and are rescued by Riva. Navin joins the Resistance fighters underground. They escape to Frontera to plan an attack on Valcor. The Stonekeepers confront the Voice in the void, and Max sacrifices himself.

=== Book 7: Firelight ===
The Stonekeepers search for Algos Island. Gabilan helps Emily and Trellis enter a memory where they witness Trellis's past. Emily follows a vision of her father and falls under the Voice's control, transforming into a firebird. The Resistance evacuates Frontera.

=== Book 8: Supernova ===
Emily, controlled by the Voice, struggles with her destructive actions. Trellis and Vigo realize she retains some control. Navin and Alyson continue the fight against the shadows. Emily breaks free from the Voice and confronts the Elf King, suddenly revealing him as a puppet of the Voice who has his name revealed to be Ikol.

=== Book 9: Waverider ===
Emily travels to Typhon, freeing other Stonekeepers. Gabilan returns and is instead named King of Valcor while Trellis becomes an Elder Stonekeeper. Navin and Alyson face a Shadow-controlled General Ivus. Emily frees them, confronts Ikol, and lifts the Shadows' curse. Emily, Navin, and Karen return to their dimension. After this, Cielis is also lifted down to the land, with the Guardian Council and Resistance then forming an alliance. In these series of events, the cursed people also came back to their original forms.

== Character biographies ==
=== Main characters ===
==== Emily Hayes ====
Emily is a young Stonekeeper who discovers a powerful amulet. She is brave and determined, protecting Alledia from the Elf King and eventually the Voice. Emily grapples with her responsibilities and the loss of her father. Emily's main goal in the series is to restore her family's youth and to help the world she has been sent to.

==== Navin Hayes ====
Emily's younger brother, Navin, is skilled with robots and becomes the commander of the Resistance. He matures throughout the series, playing a key role in the fight against the Elf King.

==== Trellis ====
The Elf King's son and Luger's brother, Trellis is at first the antagonist but eventually joins Emily's side. He seeks to free his people from the Elves' influence and eventually becomes King of Valcor.

==== Vigo Light ====
A Stonekeeper, Vigo helps Emily and her friends. He mentors Trellis and plays a crucial role in the fight against Ikol.

==== Leon Redbeard ====
A human turned fox, Leon guides Emily and her friends in Kanalis and teaches Emily to use the amulet's power.

==== Max Griffin ====
A Stonekeeper manipulated by the Voice, Max initially appears helpful but steals the Mother Stone. His past reveals his motivation for revenge because of the death of his former friend Layra as ikol is manuliplated him but dies peacefully in number 6 where he tells Emily a key part to help her beat ikol

==== The Elf King ====
The former ruler of Alledia, the Elf King's corpse was controlled by Ikol and he served as a major antagonist.

=== Ikol ===
The main antagonist of the series. He is the voice of the amulets, and the main cause of the conflict.

=== Supporting characters ===
==== Karen Hayes ====
Emily and Navin's mother, Karen is kidnapped early in the series but later rejoins her children.

==== Alyson Hunter ====
Navin's friend and a member of the Resistance, Alyson fights alongside him against the Elf King and the Shadows.

==== Riva Ash ====
The mayor of Lucien, Riva aids Navin and the Resistance and becomes an important ally.

== Volumes ==
Volume #	Title	Release date	ISBN
1	The Stonekeeper	January 1, 2008	9780439846806 (HC) 9780439846813 (TPB)
2	The Stonekeeper's Curse	September 1, 2009	9780439846820 (HC) 9780439846837 (TPB)
3	The Cloud Searchers	September 1, 2010	9780545208840 (HC) 9780545208857 (TPB)
4	The Last Council	September 1, 2011	9780545208864 (HC) 9780545208871 (TPB)
5	Prince of the Elves	September 1, 2012	9780545208888 (HC) 9780545208895 (TPB)
6	Escape from Lucien	August 26, 2014	9780545848992 (HC) 9780545433150 (TPB)
7	Firelight	February 23, 2016	9780545839662 (HC) 9780545433167 (TPB)
8	Supernova	September 25, 2018	9780545850025 (HC) 9780545828604 (TPB)
9	Waverider	February 6, 2024	9780545850032 (HC) 9780545828659 (TPB)

On October 3, 2014, Kibuishi confirmed on Twitter that the series would have nine volumes. The final volume, Waverider, was released on February 6, 2024.

== Film adaptations ==
A planned film adaptation by 20th Century Fox was cancelled. In October 2024, Netflix acquired the rights, with Jason Fuchs co-writing with Kibuishi.
