= Brian Fies =

American cartoonist

- Born: 1960 (age 65–66)
- Area: Cartoonist
- Notable works: Mom's Cancer; The Last Mechanical Monster; A Fire Story
- Awards: Eisner Award (2005); Harvey Award (Best New Talent); Lulu Blooker Prize (Comics category); Deutscher Jugendliteraturpreis (German Youth Literature Prize, Non-Fiction category); Inkpot Award (2018)

Brian Fies (pronounced "feez" /ˈfiːz/) is an American cartoonist.

== Early life and influences ==
Fies "grew up on newspaper comics and superhero comic books"; his influences include Charles M. Schulz, Walt Kelly, Milton Caniff, Alex Raymond, Winsor McCay, Cliff Sterrett, Jack Kirby, John Buscema, Neal Adams, and Alex Toth.

His first job out of college was as a reporter for a small local newspaper.

== Career ==
Fies is the creator of Mom's Cancer, which was the first webcomic to receive an Eisner Award. Fies won the Eisner in 2005 under the newly created category "Best Digital Comic". Mom's Cancer also won Fies a Harvey Award, in the Best New Talent category, as well as the Lulu Blooker Prize in its Comics category. The German edition of the graphic novel received the Deutscher Jugendliteraturpreis (German Youth Literature Prize) in the Non-Fiction category. Mom's Cancer was also nominated for a Quill Award and two further Eisner Awards.

Fies is also the creator of The Last Mechanical Monster, which was also nominated for an Eisner Award in 2014. Other works by Fies include Whatever Happened to the World of Tomorrow? and the 18-page webcomic A Fire Story (later expanded to a 154-page book), which recounts the devastation caused by California wildfires in 2017 which destroyed his home.

Fies was given an Inkpot Award in 2018.

== Published works ==
- Mom's Cancer (webcomic, 2004–; Harry N. Abrams, 2006) ISBN 978-0810971073
- Whatever Happened to the World of Tomorrow? (Harry N. Abrams, 2012) ISBN 978-1419704413
- The Last Mechanical Monster (webcomic, 2013–; Harry N. Abrams, 2022) ISBN 978-1419756122
- A Fire Story (webcomic, 2017; Abrams ComicArts, 2019) ISBN 978-1419735851
