= Pan Cooke =

Irish illustrator and street artist

- Born: Dublin, Ireland
- Website: www.pancooke.com

Pan Cooke is an Irish illustrator and street artist from Dublin, Ireland.

== Career ==
In 2014, Cooke, a portrait painter, put up several temporary street art tributes to American actor Robin Williams around Dublin after his death. He gradually lost interest in portrait painting, and decided to focus on illustration during the COVID-19 pandemic in the Republic of Ireland. After the Murder of George Floyd and the subsequent protests, Cooke started researching police brutality. While researching, he learned about the killing of Eric Garner and he started to illustrate cartoons depicting Garner's life, and the lives of others killed by police brutality, sharing the comics on Instagram.

Cooke has also created comics on; Atatiana Jefferson, John Crawford III, Amir Locke, Daunte Wright, Eugene Goodman, Ahmaud Arbery, Breonna Taylor, and a satirical comic on Enoch Burke.

In 2024, he released his debut graphic novel memoir, Puzzled, which focuses on his childhood with obsessive–compulsive disorder (OCD). It was included on the Child Mind Institute's The Best Kids' Books About Mental Health of 2024 list.

== Bibliography ==
- Pan, Cooke (2024). Puzzled: A Memoir of Growing Up with OCD. Rocky Pond Books. ISBN 9780593615621.
- Cooke, Pan. Tales from Reddit - Issue 1.
- Cooke, Pan; Ufot, Nsé (2027). Say Their Names: Remembering the Past to Change the Future. Rocky Pond Books. ISBN 9780593857793.
