= Mom's Cancer =

Webcomic and graphic novel by Brian Fies

- Cover of the printed graphic novel
- Author: Brian Fies
- Current status/schedule: Completed
- Launch date: 2004
- Publisher: Harry N. Abrams (2006)
- Genre: Autobiographical

Mom's Cancer is an autobiographical graphic medicine webcomic by Brian Fies which describes his mother's fight against metastatic lung cancer, as well as his family's reactions to it. Mom's Cancer was the first webcomic to win an Eisner Award, winning in 2005. Its print collection, published in 2006, won a Harvey Award and a Deutscher Jugendliteraturpreis.

== Characters and story ==
There are four main characters in the story, all of which are part of the family. None of the characters are ever referred by name, and the author uses his relationships to identify them.

- Mom: the author's mother; she is in her 60s, and suffers from stage IV metastatic lung cancer.
- Me: The author, a "self-employed writer" in his 40s, and the eldest child.
- Nurse Sis: One of the author's sisters; slightly younger than him, and a registered nurse.
- Kid Sis: The author's youngest sister; an actress and writer who lives with her mother.

Aside from the main characters, there are several secondary characters who appear several times, most notably the author's stepfather and his mother's head doctor.

A reviewer described the story as...

not a discussion about the science of cancer, [and] not a guidebook to the troubles one may face with this disease.... Through this graphic novel, Fies simply tries to make sense of and document the reality of the course of his mother's illness and how it affected his family.... He simply tells the reader how it is, how he felt, and how it happened.... Mixed messages from different doctors contradict and confound one another. As Fies' mother struggles (and to an extent, fails) to understand her illness she is made to feel less than by providers who belittle her concerns or simply put on a big smile. The pain, fear, and anguish that patients face once they leave the hospital is brought to the forefront throughout the book."

== Format ==
The story is divided into chapters, each one containing several multipanel pages. Although the webcomic is mostly presented in black and white, several chapters are done in full or partial color, primarily for effect or when color helps the understanding of the ideas that are presented. In total, there are thirty-three chapters, including an epilogue.

The comic was originally published Mom's Cancer on its own website. The comic is no longer hosted there, but later appeared in full on GoComics. The webcomic was published as a graphic novel by Harry N. Abrams in March 2006.

== Reception ==
=== Awards ===
Mom's Cancer was the first webcomic to receive an Eisner Award. Fies won in 2005 under the newly-created category "Best Digital Comic". Fies also won a Harvey Award, in the Best New Talent category, for Mom's Cancer, as well as the Lulu Blooker Prize in its Comics category. The German edition of the graphic novel received the Deutscher Jugendliteraturpreis (German Youth Literature Prize) in the Non-Fiction category. Mom's Cancer was also nominated for a Quill Award and two further Eisner Awards.

=== Reviews ===
Medical student Samantha Estevez, writing for the blog Graphic Medicine, encouraged anyone in medicine to read the work, saying "No matter what field of medicine you are in, you are sure to encounter cancer and Fies' perspective may help you not only be a better physician for your patients but a better friend to them as well." Several scientific papers have cited Mom's Cancer when examining medical humanities such as doctor-patient interactions and narratives around illness.
