= Nathan Hale (author) =

American author and illustrator

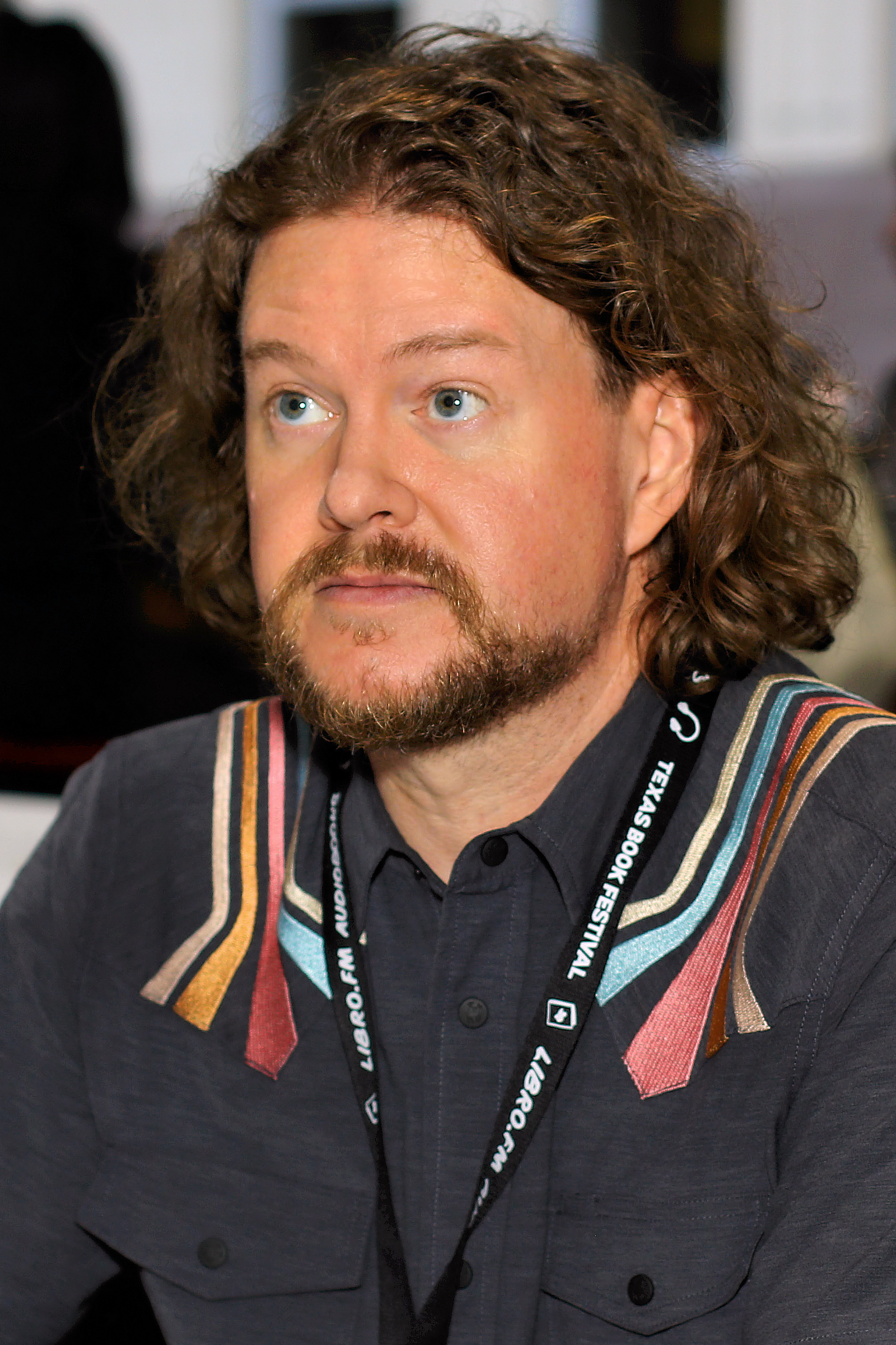
- Hale at the 2025 Texas Book Festival
- Born: 1976 (age 49–50); Sundance, Utah
- Occupations: Author and illustrator
- Known for: Nathan Hale's Hazardous Tales series
- Children: 2

Nathan Hale is an American author and illustrator of children's books, most notably the Nathan Hale's Hazardous Tales series. He is also the illustrator of the graphic novels Rapunzel's Revenge, its sequel, Calamity Jack, Frankenstein: A Monstrous Parody, The Dinosaurs’ Night Before Christmas, and many others. His work has been nominated for four Eisner Awards.

He currently lives in Provo, Utah.

== Biography ==
Nathan grew up in Sundance, Utah, the child of ski instructors. His family didn't have any entertainment except for some fantasy stories, which his father would read out loud to him and his siblings.

Nathan went to Cornish College in Seattle. He first worked at a natural history museum, painting displays.

In 2011, Nathan was asked to illustrate Rapunzel's Revenge, and then asked to illustrate Calamity Jack. He was then inspired to create his own graphic novel series. The next year, he wrote and illustrated One Dead Spy, which was about the life of Nathan Hale, a soldier and spy for the Continental Army during the American Revolutionary War. The next books explained the American Revolutionary War, the Alamo, exploration of the Grand Canyon, the Underground Railroad, World War I, World War II, and the Haitian Revolution in hilarious ways.

He now lives in Utah and is an avid collector of Lego sets.

== Awards and honors ==
Many of Hale's books from the Nathan Hale's Hazardous Tales series have landed on The New York Times Best Seller list. The Underground Abductor and Alamo All Stars held the number one position.

Eight of the books Hale has authored, as well as two books he has solely illustrated, are Junior Library Guild selections: Rapunzel’s Revenge (2008), Calamity Jack (2010), Alamo All-Stars (2016), One Trick Pony (2017), Raid of No Return (2017), Lafayette! (2018), Major Impossible (2020), Blades of Freedom (2021), Cold War Correspondent (2022), and Above the Trenches (2023)

In 2011, Bank Street College of Education marked Calamity Jack as being of "outstanding merit" in its list of the best books of the year.

In 2017, One Trick Pony was named one of the best books of the year by VOYA, Chicago Public Library, and the New York Public Library.

Awards and honors for Hale's writing and illustrations
| Year | Title | Award | Result | Ref. |
|---|---|---|---|---|
| 2008 | Rapunzel's Revenge | Cybil Award for Elementary and Middle Grade Graphic Novel | Winner | |
| 2009 | Rapunzel's Revenge | Leah Adezio Award for Best Kid-Friendly Work | Winner | |
| 2009 | Rapunzel's Revenge | ALSC Notable Children's Books | Selection | |
| 2009 | Rapunzel's Revenge | Great Graphic Novels for Teens | Selection | |
| 2010 | Rapunzel's Revenge | Amelia Bloomer List | Selection | |
| 2011 | Calamity Jack | Great Graphic Novels for Teens | Selection | |
| 2012 | Big Bad Ironclad! | Cybil Award for Elementary and Middle Grade Graphic Novel | Finalist | |
| 2013 | Donner Dinner Party | Cybil Award for Elementary and Middle Grade Graphic Novel | Finalist | |
| 2013 | One Dead Spy | Great Graphic Novels for Teens | Selection | |
| 2014 | Donner Dinner Party | Great Graphic Novels for Teens | Selection | |
| 2014 | Donner Dinner Party | Spur Award for Best Western Juvenile Nonfiction | Nominee | |
| 2015 | Treaties, Trenches, Mud, and Blood | Great Graphic Novels for Teens | Selection | |
| 2015 | Treaties, Trenches, Mud, and Blood | Will Eisner Award for Best Reality-Based Work | Nominee | |
| 2016 | The Underground Abductor | Will Eisner Award for Best Publication for Kids (ages 9–12) | Finalist | |
| 2016 | The Underground Abductor | Will Eisner Award for Best Writer/Artist | Finalist | |
| 2018 | One Trick Pony | Great Graphic Novels for Teens | Selection | |
| 2019 | Lafayette! | Excellence in Graphic Literature Award for Nonfiction | Finalist | |
| 2020 | Major Impossible | Excellence in Graphic Literature Award for Nonfiction | Finalist | |
| 2022 | Cold War Correspondent | Excellence in Graphic Literature Award for Nonfiction | Finalist | |

== Publications ==
=== As author ===
==== Standalone books ====
- The Devil You Know (2005)
- The Twelve Bots of Christmas (2005)
- Yellowbelly and Plum Go to School (2007)
- One Trick Pony (2017)
- Apocalypse Taco (2019)

==== Nathan Hale's Hazardous Tales series ====
- One Dead Spy (2012)
- Big Bad Ironclad! (2012)
- Donner Dinner Party (2013)
- Treaties, Trenches, Mud, and Blood (2014)
- The Underground Abductor (2015)
- Alamo All-Stars (2016)
- Raid of No Return (2017)
- Lafayette! (2018)
- Major Impossible (2019)
- Blades of Freedom (2020)
- Cold War Correspondent: A Korean War Tale (2021)
- Let's Make History! Create Your Own Comics (2022)
- Above the Trenches (2023)
- Bones and Berserkers (2025)
- The Web of War (2026)

=== As illustrator ===
- Balloon on the Moon, written by Dan McCann (2008)
- The Dinosaurs' Night Before Christmas, written by Anne Muecke (2008)
- Rapunzel's Revenge, written by Shannon Hale and Dean Hale (2008)
- Calamity Jack, written by Shannon Hale and Dean Hale (2010)

=== The Mighty Bite Series ===
- The Mighty Bite (2023)
- The Mighty Bite #2: Walrus Brawl at the Mall (2024)
- The Mighty Bite #3: Hog-Rocket Ruckus (2025)
