= Hope Larson =

American cartoonist (born 1982)

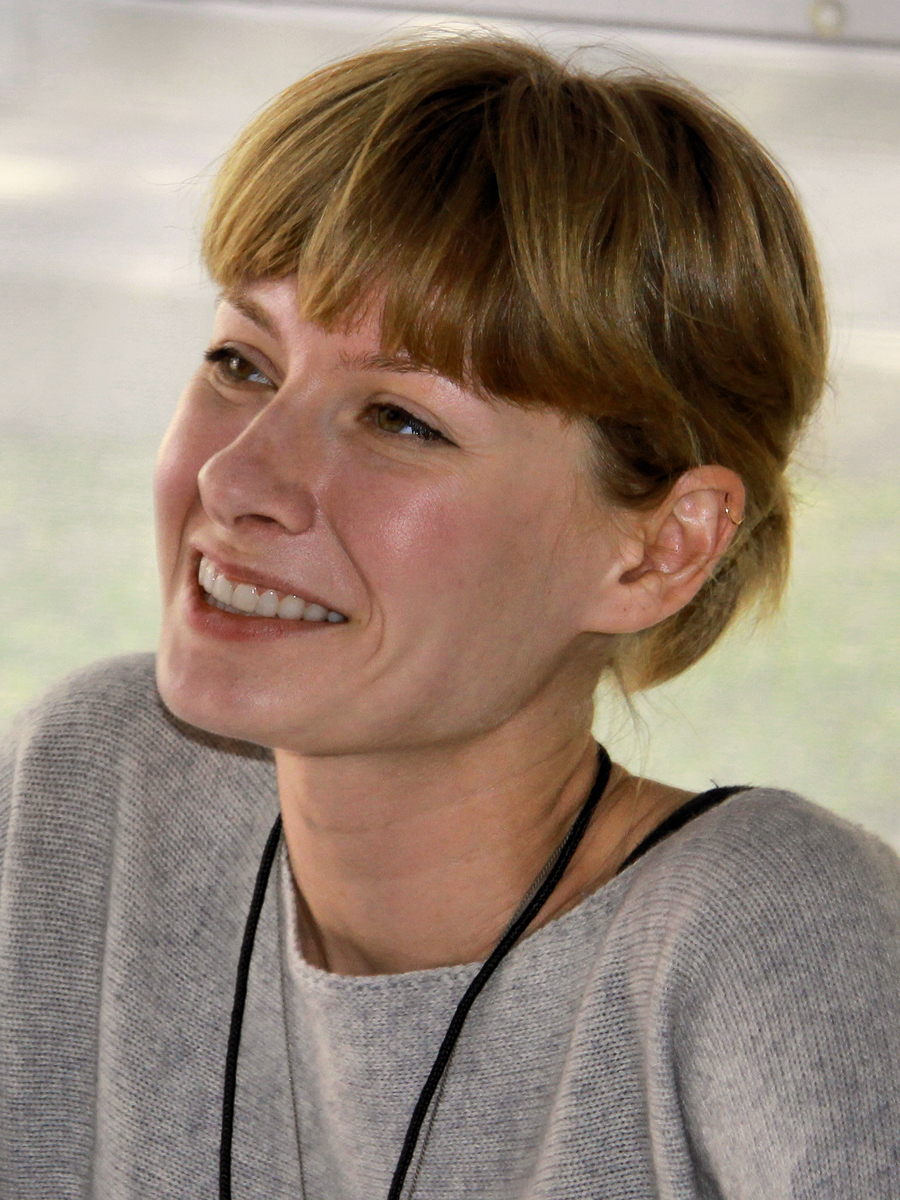
- Hope Larson at the 2012 Texas Book Festival.
- Born: September 17, 1982 (age 44) Chapel Hill, North Carolina, U.S.
- Areas: Cartoonist, illustrator, writer
- Notable works: Salamander Dream; Chiggers; A Wrinkle in Time: the Graphic Novel
- Awards: Ignatz Award (2006); Eisner Award (2007, 2013)
- Spouse: Bryan Lee O'Malley (m. 2004; div. 2014)

Hope Raue Larson (b. September 17, 1982, in Chapel Hill, North Carolina) is an American illustrator and cartoonist. Her main field is comic books.

== Early life ==
Larson grew up in Asheville, North Carolina, and attended Carolina Day School. Upon graduation from high school, she matriculated at Rochester Institute of Technology and then transferred to the School of the Art Institute of Chicago, where she graduated with a Bachelor of Fine Arts in 2004.

== Career ==
While Larson was in college, Scott McCloud took an interest in her illustrations, encouraging her to create comics. Soon after, she was invited to the webcomics anthology site Girlamatic and produced her first professional comic, a web serial entitled I Was There & Just Returned. Afterwards, Larson concentrated on a number of small, hand-made minicomics, combining her interests in comics, screenprinting, and bookmaking.

She contributed to comics anthologies Flight, True Porn 2, and You Ain't No Dancer, while working on a web-serialized graphic novel, Salamander Dream. This eventually became her first full-length book, published by AdHouse Books in September 2005; she moved to Oni Press for her second graphic novel, Gray Horses (released March 2006).

In 2006, Larson signed a two-book contract with New York publishing house Simon & Schuster. The first book under this deal, Chiggers (released June 18, 2008, under the Atheneum Books Ginee Seo imprint), is a graphic novel about "nerdy teenaged girls" who meet at summer camp. Chiggers is intended for a 9- to 12-year-old audience.

In 2012, Larson adapted Madeleine L'Engle's work as A Wrinkle in Time: The Graphic Novel, published by Margaret Ferguson Books (a Farrar Straus Giroux imprint). The book was given the 2013 Eisner Award for Best Publication for Teens.

In 2016, Larson became the new writer for DC Comics Batgirl, a run that saw the character go on back-packing trip through Asia on a voyage of self-discovery.

In addition to comics, Larson has worked as a freelance illustrator for various clients, including the New York Times.

She has worked as a letterer on such books as Brian Wood and Ryan Kelly's Local.

Larson's book All Summer Long was released by Farrar Straus Giroux in the spring of 2018.

=== Publishing ===
In 2006, Larson launched her own publishing imprint, Tulip Tree Press. She released several minicomics and prints through the Tulip Tree website; the only book released under the Tulip Tree name was House of Sugar, an award-winning collection of Rebecca Kraatz's comic strip, released 15 November 2006. Tulip Tree Press shut down in 2008.

=== Acclaim ===
Larson was nominated for the 2006 Kimberly Yale Award for Best New Female Talent, and won the 2006 Ignatz Award in the category Promising New Talent. In 2007, Larson won the Eisner Award for Special Recognition (formerly known as "Talent Deserving of Wider Recognition"). She won the Eisner Award again in 2013 for her A Wrinkle in Time adaptation.

Rebecca Kraatz's House of Sugar, Larson's first publishing venture, won the 2007 Doug Wright Award for Best Emerging Talent.

All Summer Long was a Kirkus Reviews Best Book of 2018.

== Personal life ==
In 2004, Larson moved to Toronto with her husband, Canadian cartoonist Bryan Lee O'Malley. In 2005, they moved to Halifax, Nova Scotia. From 2008 until 2010, Larson and O'Malley lived in Asheville, North Carolina, later moving to Los Angeles, California. She and O'Malley divorced in 2014.

== Works ==
=== Mainstream comic book work ===
- Batgirl, DC Comics, 2016–2018 (writer, with artist Rafael Albuquerque)

=== Graphic novels ===
- Salamander Dream. AdHouse Books, 2005
- Gray Horses. Oni Press, 2006
- Chiggers. Atheneum Books, 2008
- Mercury. Atheneum Books, 2010
- A Wrinkle in Time: The Graphic Novel. Farrar, Straus and Giroux, 2012
- Who is AC (writer, with artist Tintin Pantoja). Atheneum Books, 2013
- Four Points series (writer, with artist Rebecca Mock)
  - Compass South, Farrar, Straus and Giroux, 2016
  - Knife's Edge, Farrar, Straus and Giroux, 2017
- Salt Magic (writer, with artist Rebecca Mock), Holiday House (Margaret Ferguson Books), 2021
- Be That Way, Holiday House (Margaret Ferguson Books), 2023
- Very Bad at Math, HarperAlley, 2025
- Goldie Vance (writer, with artist Brittney Williams). Boom! Studios, 2016
- Eagle Rock series
  - All Summer Long, Farrar, Straus and Giroux, 2018
  - All Together Now, Farrar, Straus and Giroux, 2020
  - All My Friends, Farrar, Straus and Giroux, 2021

=== Selected short stories and minicomics ===
- "Sex Rainbow," March 2004 (originally printed as a deck of cards)
- "Compound Eye," April 2004
- "Weather Vain," August 2004 (originally printed in Flight Vol. 2)
- "Mud," February 2005 (originally printed in You Ain't No Dancer #1)
- "Little House in the Big Woods," August 2006 (originally printed in the New York Times)
- "When I Was A Slut," March 2006 (published in Project: Romantic)
- "Henry and Elizabeth," July 2007 (printed in the New York Times, and later expanded to a minicomic)
- "Cosplay," February 2018 (published by Dark Horse Books in Secret Loves of Geeks)

== See also ==
- Women in comics
