= Immigration of Latinas to the United States =

The term Latino/a, derived from the Spanish latinoamericano, has been traced by some scholars to the Colombian writer José María Torres Caicedo, who used it in the mid-nineteenth century. In the United States, the term later developed a distinct meaning as a way to refer to people of Latin American origin or descent. During the twentieth century, terms such as "Latin", "Spanish", "Hispanic" and "Latino" were used in different contexts to classify populations of Mexican, Puerto Rican, Caribbean, Central American, and South American origin.

In contemporary usage, Latino/a generally refers to people in the United States whose cultural, national or ancestral origins an in Latin America, including Mexico, Central America, South America and the Spanish-speaking Caribbean. Unlike "Hispanic", which has often been associated with official government classification, "Latino/a" has also been used as a form of cultural and political self-identification. However, both terms can marginalize and exclude differences in national origin, race, class, migratory history and geographic among Latin American-origin populations.

== History of Latina migration ==
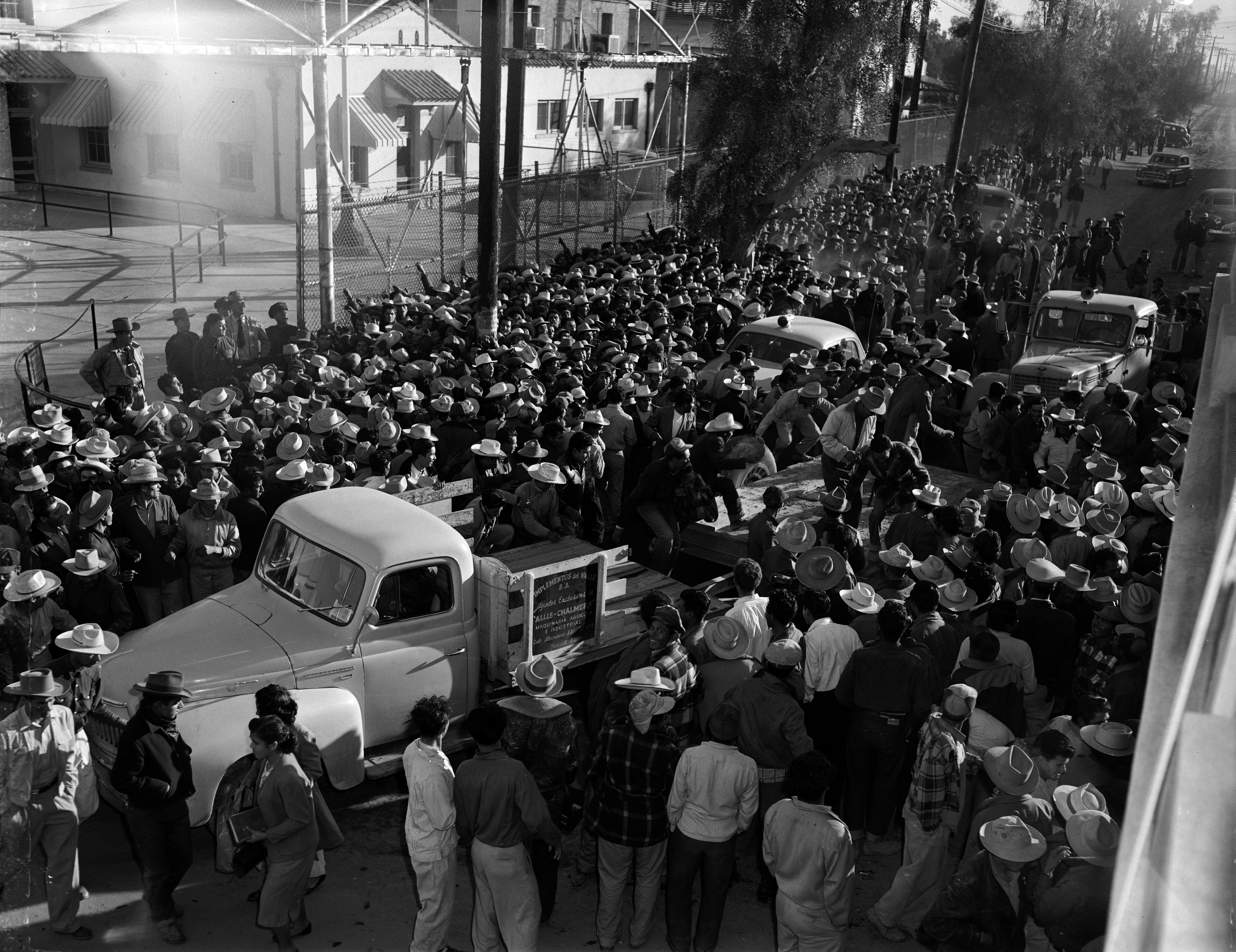
A group of men entered in the Bracero Program

Latina migration to the U.S. is incorporated into the web of social relations that structure migration patterns according to gender differences The expansion of global capitalism has led to the growing incorporation of women into the labor market and, in parallel to the feminization of labor and international migration simultaneously. This process responds to profound transformations, such as the decline of the "male breadwinner" model to the generalization of households with multiple earners, the rise of the service sector, and the consolidation of feminized jobs in countries of the Global North, characterized by precariousness.

Feminist political economy scholars have linked neoliberal policies to the weakening of social protection systems and privatization of social reproduction. This process has been described as a catalyst of the "care crisis", in which domestic and care responsibilities are increasingly transferred to migrant women from the Global South. In countries of the Global North, the demand of reproductive labor has encouraged the migration of Latin American women to economies such as the United States. This has contributed to the formation of global care chain and transnational gender inequalities. Within this context, globalization has expanded opportunities for mobility while also reconfiguring social hierarchies and gender norms. Migrant women's participation in paid labor usually coexists with their concentration in unstable jobs in services and care sectors.

=== 1970–present ===
The 1970s marked the first decade in which a gender shift occurred in Mexican migration. During this time, more single women and more families began to migrate along with the working males who had already been migrating for several decades. This difference in gender migration is largely attributed to the difference in Latino and Latina work opportunities in the United States. Prior to the 1970s, the majority of the Latino migratory work was agriculturally based. However, with the end of the Bracero program, the United States policy on migration within the hemisphere shifted from encouraging primarily working males to migrate. Beginning with the Watershed amendment of 1965, the United States shifted their policy to encourage the migration of whole families by issuing less visas to unskilled single men and more visas to families. This marked the beginning of a large increase in Latina migration. While men typically migrate at a young age concentration of 18–25, females migrate at generally consistent rates at all age groups. This signals a difference in motives for female migration. While Latinos almost always migrate to the United States in search of work, Latina migration follows a pattern heavily tied to family life.

Likewise, the early waves of the Cuban migration were primarily families. After they Bay of Pigs failure, many middle class Cuban families sought escape from the newly communist Cuba in the United States. 1961 and 1962 were marked by full family Cuban immigration. Thus, many Cuban women found themselves in the United States as a result of their family. After the Cuban Missile Crisis, the ability for Cubans to immigrate with their families became limited as a result of strained US-Cuba relations. This led to Cubans use of flotillas in order to make it to the southern coast of Florida.

== Latina migration from a gender perspective ==
Women's participation withing migratory flows is connected to the roles they play in the global economy and the social organization of care. This phenomenon is often described as "feminization of migration"; nevertheless, women have historically been part of migratory movements. In 1960, women represented 46.8% of international migrants. Although women have been present in migration flows throughout history, what distinguishes this phenomenon since late twentieth century is the qualitive change in the position they assume, beyond the increase in statistical terms. In particular, there has been a transformation in the position women as primary providers in their households of origin and in the global economy. Therefore, their growing participation in migratory processes is deeply linked to the care crisis in the Global North and the advance of neoliberal globalization, which has transformed productive structures and the international division of labor. These changes have impacted and increased the demand of migrants' women workforce in destination countries; especially in services and care sectors.

== Reasons for Latina migration ==
While the primary reason for immigration into the United States for Latinas is economic improvement, the betterment of family life remains an important factor. Latina women also migrate with their families in an effort to seek refuge from violence and political instability in their native countries. Violent events in El Salvador, Guatemala and Honduras the number of Latinas entering the United States with families has nearly doubled in 2015. Likewise, many Latina women identified their primary reason for immigration was to reunite with family already in the United States.

== Health ==
The Hispanic paradox refers to the medical research indicating that Latino immigrants enter the United States with better health, on average, than the average American citizen, but lose this health benefit the longer they reside in the United States. This health paradox affects both male and female populations of Latinos. Likewise, immigrant Latina women are found to have a lower infant mortality rate than U.S. born women. This has been explained by the tendency for Hispanic women to continue breastfeeding for a longer amount of time.

The Affordable Care Act does not cover non-citizens nor does it cover immigrants with less than 5 years of residency. As a result, Latino immigrants struggle to gain health care once they enter the United States. Non-citizen Latinos often avoid hospitals and clinics for fear of deportation, leading to an increased risk of preventable diseases such as tuberculosis and Hepatitis in this population. Additionally, Latino health deteriorates as this population assimilates into unhealthy lifestyles associated with lower socioeconomic American populations.

== Latina women in the workforce ==
Immigration to the United States offers new economic prospects for Latina women. While many Latina women work outside the home in their countries of origin, their efforts in the U.S. often yield more economic benefits. The Institute of Latino Studies at the University of Notre Dame comments on this idea with Mexican women in mind, claiming that "much of the work that women do in the United States generates more income than it would in Mexico, allowing women to be much more financially independent." This financial independence allows these women more freedom to act as the head of household.

Though economic conditions in the U.S. are often better for these immigrants than in the countries from which they came, they are nowhere near those that men and even women of other ethnicities enjoy. Latina women make disproportionately less money than their male and non-Hispanic white counterparts. These disparities in wage and job availability leave this portion of the United States population more vulnerable to poverty and its implications. Though it is common knowledge that women in the United States make less than their male counterparts, this wage gap further varies by ethnicity. On average, Latina women make 55 cents to the dollar when compared to white, non-Hispanic males while white women make 78.1 cents to the same dollar. This discrepancy between white and Latina women continues further. The number of working poor Latina women is more than double that of white women, and poverty rates for Latinas are nearly triple those of white women. The elimination of this wage gap, on average, equates to: 194 more weeks of food for a Latina's family, more than 17 more months of mortgage and utility payments, nearly 27 more months of rent, or 12,342 additional gallons of gas.

These wage gaps in the workforce affect Latinas at every socioeconomic status, not just the working class. Latina women are the most likely group to be paid at or below the minimum wage, with 5.7% of wage and salary workers earning this amount. Of women in the workforce with advanced degrees (master's, professional, and doctoral degrees), Latinas earn the lowest median weekly earnings of all racial and ethnic groups in the United States. Despite discrimination in the workforce, Latina participation is on the rise. From 1970 to 2007 Latinas have seen a 14% increase in labor force participation, which the Center for American Progress calls "a notable rise."

Of the Latinas participating in the labor force, 32.2% work in the service sector, according to the Bureau of Labor Statistics. This percentage is significantly higher than that of white women, who fall at 20%. Conversely, Latinas are underrepresented in various other sectors of the labor force, particularly as business owners. However, Latina entrepreneurship has grown immensely since the start of the 21st century. In 2011, 788,000 Latinas ran their own businesses, representing a 46% increase from 2006. Comparatively, female business owners as a whole only increased by 20% during this same time period.

During the COVID-19 pandemic, family caregiving responsibilities also affected Latina participation in paid employment. A 2022 UCLA Latino Policy & Politics Institute report found that about 1.45 million Latinas were not working because of family care responsibilities in August 2022, nearly unchanged from 1.5 million in August 2020. The report describes domestic work and caregiving as “the foundation of society,” highlighting the economic and social importance of unpaid care work.

== Family ==
In the United States, female employment has become an increasingly important determinant of family economic well-being, especially among disadvantaged populations such as Latinas. Female employment offers these women more autonomy, the chance to support themselves without relying on a spouse.

=== Domestic abuse ===
This autonomy is particularly important considering some researchers believe that Latinas may be particularly vulnerable to domestic violence issues. These domestic abuse struggles result from a combination of violent partners and bureaucratic complications of the US immigration system. Domestic issues among immigrants are potentially exacerbated by language barriers, economic dependence, low levels of education and income, poor knowledge of services, undocumented status, lack of a support system, and the immigration experience in general. According to the Rutgers School of Social Work, around 17% of Latina immigrants are victims of Domestic Violence. This violence can manifest in different ways, and is often difficult to diagnose when it the result of verbal threats rather than physical abuse. Oftentimes, it is threats of deportation that influence Latina women to keep silent about their situation.

=== Latina family values and structure ===
Because the Latina ethnicity encompasses a large variety of people, including people of various races from various countries, it is difficult to define the Latina Family experience in a simple way. To do so would oversimplify this population and result to stereotyping, as the experience of Latinas is just as nuanced as the women who comprise this ethnic group. There is a significant lack of literature on the home life experience of Latina women and how it may change with immigration to the United States.

==== Family life in countries of origin ====
Patterns of female family structure are found to be similar in Nicaragua and the Dominican Republic, and tend to be more matrifocal. Conversely, Mexican and Costa Rican women are often migrating from a patriarchal husband-wife system, with just 13% and 22% of households headed by women in these countries, respectively. Puerto Rico lies somewhere between these two systems, sharing aspects of both patriarchal and matrifocal systems. According to a study published by the National Institute of Health, these patterns correspond with relatively low female participation in the labor force.

==== Latina power in the United States ====
For Mexican and Costa Rican women in particular, life in the United States represents a significant shift in opportunities for family life, as higher wages allow women the ability to be more autonomous. In a 2013 Nielson study in the United States, Latinas said they were primary or joint decision makers in the household, giving input in categories such as grocery shopping, insurance, financial services, electronics, and family care. Additionally, the Latina population is increasingly becoming "primary wage earners and influencers" in the modern Hispanic United States Household.

== Education ==
=== Latina immigrants' current levels of education ===
The American Immigrant Council's research states that in 2012 Latina immigrants from Mexico, Cuba, and the Dominican Republic had the lowest education level when compared to other countries. However, women had higher education rates than the Latino male immigrants, as shown in the American Immigration Council's chart. For example, 6.2% of female immigrants in Mexico have bachelor's degrees as compared to the 5.0% of male immigrants in 2012. 14% of the women immigrants from the Dominican Republic have bachelor's degrees compared to the 12% of Dominican men.

In a recent article from the International Business Times, Latino immigrant students are falling behind in academic achievements and graduation rates compared to other students. Moreover, these statistics apply to Hispanics that have not recently migrated to the United States, implying that the American education system is not meeting the needs of Latino students as a population. The Institute for Women's Policy Research shows in a study in 2008, that Latina immigrants residing in Phoenix, Northern Virginia, and Atlanta all have a lower high school completion rates when compared to their male Latino immigrant counterparts. Latinas also fall behind Latino immigrants in their likelihood to attend 1–4 years of college. However, in Northern Virginia and Atlanta a higher percentage of Latina women complete 5+ years of college than Latino men do. Latina immigrants also lack a "substantial amount" of English proficiency, as discovered in IWPR's 2008 research. This language barrier plays a significant role in the Latina educational experience and progress.

=== Education services for Latina immigrants in the United States ===
Currently, there are limited resources for Latina immigrants in the United States. As explained in Motivations of Immigration, many women come to the United States for a better education, among other factors. The Institute for Women's Policy Research explains the workings of organizations aimed to support the struggles of Latina immigrants. The IWPR states that growing organizations are currently providing English tutors and access to education. Programs specifically for Latina (and Latino) immigrants now use an adaptation tactic of teaching, rather than an assimilation ideology to help this population adjust to American life. Programs like these include Casa Latina Programs, providing education on English, workers' rights, and the consumer culture of America.

== Social issues ==
While Latina women face a multitude of issues in immigrating into the United States, perhaps the most significant ones revolve around basic human rights. All too often, illegal Latina immigrants are unable to avoid human abuse because of lack of protection from the law. As a result, Latinas endure a severely unequal migratory experience when compared to their male counterparts.

=== Human trafficking ===
Human trafficking disproportionately affects women. In the United States, an estimate of at least ten thousand people are forced into labor through such a process. Within the category of women, immigrant women are the ones who are targeted and pulled in more easily. Due to their lack of knowledge of their new surroundings, the English language, and vulnerability to work, these women are more easily tricked, or coerced, into these businesses. These women come into the United States looking for improved employment or educational opportunities, making them much more vulnerable to coercion and false job opportunities offered by traffickers. Additionally, many immigrant women do not understand their rights, or are faced with threats of deportation. Much of this trafficking is hard to detect, as it is not usually visible to the public or governmental eye.

=== Dealing with social issues ===
There are various Latina women involved in organizations and programs that aim to aid Latina women affected/victimized by human trafficking or domestic abuse. Some of these influential women include Maria Jose Fletcher, Laura Zarate, Rosie Hidalgo, Olga Trujillo, Susan Reyna.

In Florida, Maria Jose Fletcher is the founder and co-director of VIDA Legal Assistance, a not-for-profit legal organization whose purpose is to provide legal support for the immigrant women who have been victims of violent crimes. This organization acknowledges and aims to solve the issue of fear of deportation that plagues the Latina community and makes it fearful of reporting such crimes.

Laura Zarate is the co-founder of the organization of Arte Sana, which translates to "Art Heals." This Latina-lead organization was founded in Austin, Texas and serves the purpose of addressing sexual violence.

Rosie Hidalgo has used her position as a former attorney in New York City and her current role as the Director of Public Policy for Casa de Esperanza and the National Latin@ Network to help fight domestic violence issues. She was influential in the fight for the reauthorization of the Violence Against Women Act. She has also been awarded for her work on domestic abuse and immigration reform.

Susan Reyna is the executive director of M.U.J.E.R. (Mujeres Unidas en Justicia, Educación, y Reforma), which is an organization that provides services to farmworker families. This organization also helps victims of sexual assault and domestic violence.

== Immigrant culture within America ==
=== Mexican influence in literature ===
Immigrants have influenced today's culture in America through their practices, art, literature, and more. Latina immigrants have influenced American literature dating back to the 19th century. Maria Amparo Ruiz de Burton was the first Mexican immigrant to write a novel in English. Her literary works gave Latina women in the United States a new voice by delving into race, gender, and class of the times. This set the tone for many Latino and Latina immigrants to create works in American society.

=== Cuban influence in the arts ===
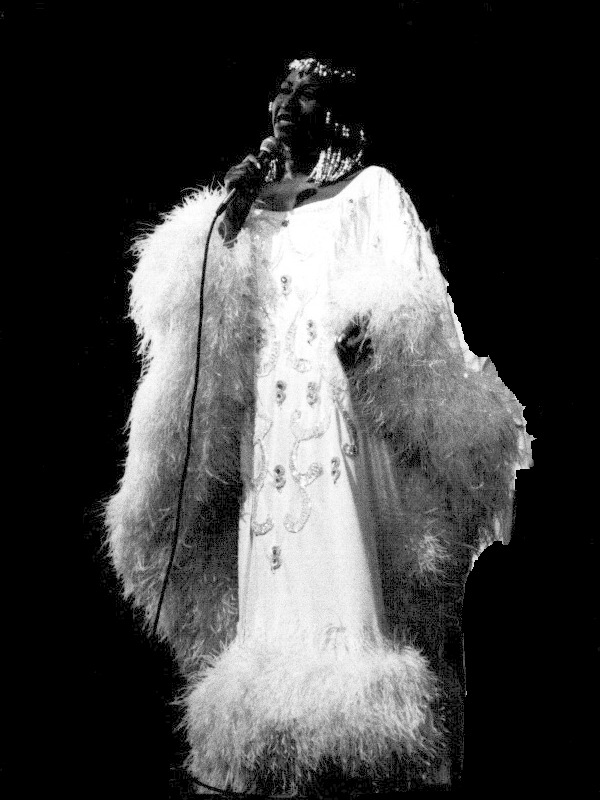
Celia Cruz

Cuban culture has made its way into America thanks to many refugees and their talents. Maria Irene Fornes, a Cuban immigrant to the United States, created plays that focused on feminism and poverty. Her success in the 1960s gave Latina immigrants a presence in off-Broadway productions. Another Cuban immigrant, Ana Mendieta, created sculptures, performances, and many other art mediums that focused on themes of women, life experiences, and earth. She received a Lifetime Achievement Award in 2009, which emphasizes her success in her artistic fields and connection to life experiences. Celia Cruz, born in Havana, Cuba, was famous for her Cuban-inspired salsa music and many Latin and American Grammy's. Cruz immigrated to the US in the early 1960s against Castro's wishes. Not only was she famous for her vocals, but she made many Hollywood appearances, resulting in a star on Hollywood's Walk of Fame. By having such a wide, diverse audience, she left her mark on America's pop culture as a female Cuban immigrant. Like Celia, Gloria Estefan was born in Cuba and is arguably the most famous Cuban American singer to date. Her Latin music flooded American radio stations and television features, bringing Latina presence into American pop culture.
