= Jellaby =

Webcomic by Kean Soo

- Author: Kean Soo
- Genre: Webcomic
- Publication date: 2008

Jellaby is a webcomic by Kean Soo, featuring a character of the same name. Jellaby has appeared in several volumes of the comics anthology Flight, as well as in its own self-titled webcomic. A full-length graphic novel, Jellaby, was published in 2008. The success of the first book led to a sequel, Jellaby: Monster in the City, which was published in 2009.

== Volumes ==
- Flight Volume Three: ISBN 0-345-49039-8
- Flight Volume Five: ISBN 0-345-50589-1
- Flight Volume Six: ISBN 0-345-50590-5
- Flight Explorer Volume One: ISBN 978-0-345-50313-8

== Awards ==
- Nomination for an Eisner Award for Best Digital Comic 2006
- Winner of a Shuster Award for Best Comic for Kids 2009
