= Kazu Kibuishi =

Japanese-born American author and illustrator

Kazu Kibuishi カズ・キブイシ
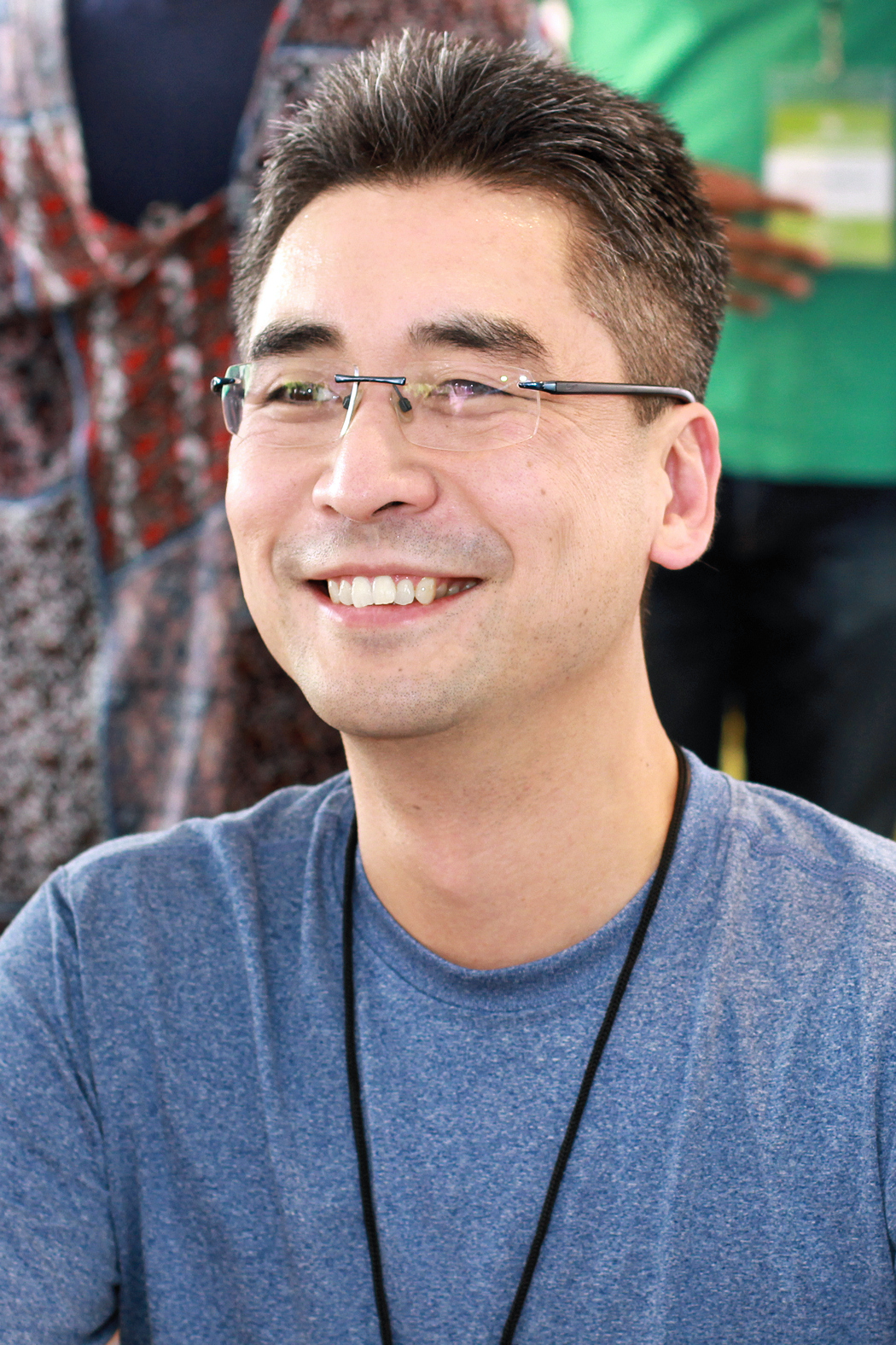
- Kibuishi at the 2018 Texas Book Festival
- Born: Kazuhiro Kibuishi; April 8, 1978 (age 48) Tokyo, Japan
- Notable works: Flight, Amulet

Kazuhiro Kibuishi (born April 8, 1978) is a Japanese-born American graphic novel author and illustrator. He is best known as the creator and editor of the comic anthology Flight and for the webcomic Copper. He is also the author and illustrator of the Amulet series.

== Early life and education ==
Kibuishi was born on April 8, 1978, in Tokyo, Japan. Kibuishi started drawing at age five. He moved to the United States with his mother and brother in 1982. He has stated that it was "the sadness that came from no longer having cool robot TV shows like Ultraman around once we came to the States that triggered a lot of my early drawings and projects". He has also noted Garfield, as well as the magazines Mad and CARtoons, as catalysts for his love of comic books in particular.

Kibuishi enrolled at the University of California, Santa Barbara in 1996 to pursue a degree in film studies. While attending UC Santa Barbara, he credits the university's newspaper, the Daily Nexus, as where his illustration career started. Though he had previously drawn for his high school's newspaper, Kibuishi has stated that "[his career] all began when I started writing comics for the Nexus. I actually went to UCSB for film. I was trying to quit drawing". He would ultimately serve as the Art Director for the Daily Nexus for three and a half years, and developed his comic Clive and Cabbage during his tenure. He graduated from UC Santa Barbara in 2000 with a B.A. in film studies.

== Career ==
After he graduated from UC Santa Barbara, Kibuishi worked as an animator for Shadedbox Animations for two years. He decided to leave animation to focus on comics, where he could spend more time writing. He started producing the monthly comic Copper at his website which ran for seven years, ending in 2009.

Flight was conceived by Kibuishi as an anthology with contributions coming from friends. The project was promoted at the Alternative Press Expo, where it attracted the attention of Erik Larsen, then-new publisher of Image Comics. This caused the project to explode, attracting talent from all over the industry. Image published the first volume in 2004 and the anthology series concluded with the eighth volume in 2011.

Following the conclusion of Flight, the Explorer series was Kibuishi's anthology for children using many of the same contributors to Flight. Seen as a successor series, Explorer covered three books and concluded with Explorer: The Hidden Doors.

Kibuishi created Amulet, a series of graphic novels which debuted in 2008 with The Stonekeeper. Scholastic won the rights to publish the series after they were victorious in a hotly contested auction. In addition to The Stonekeeper, other titles in the series include The Stonekeeper's Curse, The Cloud Searchers, The Last Council, Prince of the Elves, Escape From Lucien, Firelight, Supernova, and Waverider. The series concluded with the ninth and final book titled Waverider, which was released on February 6, 2024.

While editing Flight Volume 1, Kibuishi created the 4-issue steampunk graphic novel Daisy Kutter: The Last Train, published by Viper Comics.

Through his relationship with Scholastic, Kibuishi was asked to illustrate the covers for the Harry Potter novels for inclusion in the 15th anniversary edition box set.

He also illustrated the story "?" for the short story collection Machine of Death and Brandon Sanderson's children's book The Most Boring Book Ever.

== Awards and honors ==
Kibuishi's Flight Volume 2 was nominated for the 2006 Eisner Award for Best Anthology. Daisy Kutter: The Last Train was named as one of the 2006 Best Books for Young Adults by the Young Adult Library Services Association.

His series Amulet has spent numerous weeks on The New York Times' Best Seller list.

== Personal life ==
Kibuishi is married to fellow illustrator and collaborator Amy Kim Ganter. He has two children, Juni and Sophie. He resides in Bellevue, Washington. Shortly after the publication of Escape From Lucien in 2012, he suffered a life-threatening case of bacterial meningitis which resulted in a hospital stay for weeks and being induced into a coma for treatment and memory loss.
