= Flight (comics) =

American comics anthology series edited by Kazu Kibuishi

- Cover of Flight Volume 1

Publication information
- Publisher: Image Comics; Ballantine Books
- Format: Ongoing series
- Publication date: July 2004 – June 2011
- No. of issues: 8
- Editor: Kazu Kibuishi

Flight is an American comics anthology series edited by Kazu Kibuishi, showcasing young and innovative artists and writers. Image Comics published the first two volumes. In June 2005 Kibuishi announced that the series would move from Image to Ballantine Books from Volume Three on in an attempt to increase sales through mainstream bookstores. Kibuishi also stated that subsequent volumes would be released twice-yearly.

== Publication history ==
Volume One was published in July 2004 and contains 23 stories, totalling approximately 208 (unnumbered) pages. Volume Two, published in March 2005, is 432 pages long and contains 33 stories with a greater average length. The increase in size is almost certainly due to the interest generated in prospective contributors by the first volume. Volume Three was released in June 2006 and contains 26 stories over 352 pages. Volume Four was released in July 2007, with 344 pages, Volume Five in July 2008, with 368 pages, Volume Six in July 2009 with 283 pages, and Volume Seven in July 2010 with 288 pages. The final volume, Volume Eight, was published in June 2011, with 288 pages.

Kibuishi has denied that Flight is a themed anthology, or that the title has any significance besides being short and memorable. Nevertheless, many of the strips do feature flight in one or more sense of the word. Other than that there is no unifying style or theme; the strips exhibit a wide variety of art techniques from the conventional to the experimental, and storylines include comedy, tragedy, macabre, adventure and romance. The art typically has a surreal quality.

The series ended with Volume Eight, but will be continued by a new anthology called Explorer.

== Volumes ==
There have been eight volumes of Flight published to date, all edited by Kibuishi.

== Bibliography ==
- Flight Primer at the Grand Comics Database
- Flight Volume 1 at the Grand Comics Database
- Flight at the Comic Book DB (archived from the original)
