= Ashley Hope Pérez =

American author

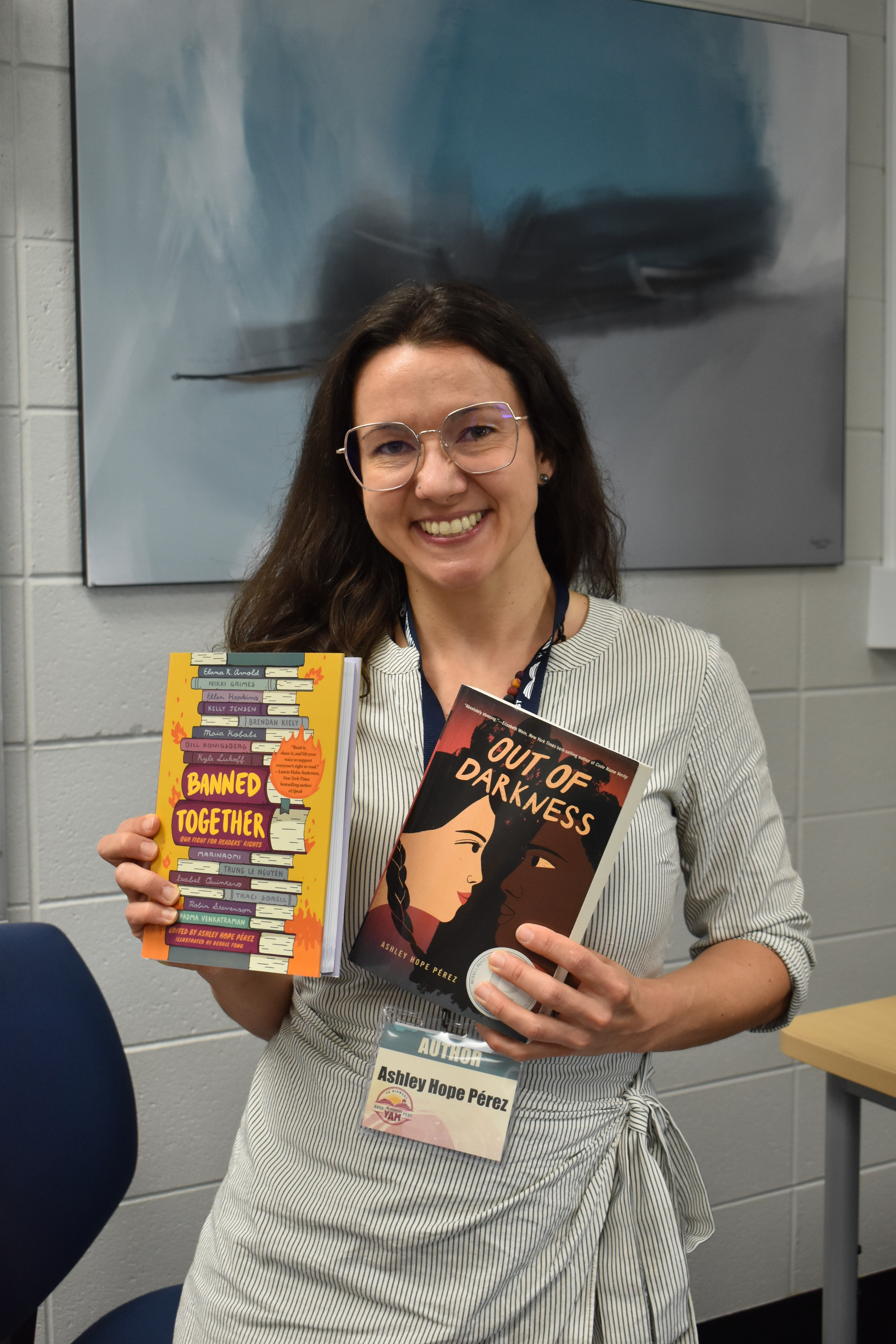
- Pérez at YA Midwest on July 26, 2025
- Occupation: Author
- Years active: 2011-present
- Notable work: The Knife and the Butterfly, What Can(t) Wait, Out of Darkness

Ashley Hope Pérez is an American author. Notable books include The Knife and the Butterfly (2011), What Can(t) Wait (2011), and Out of Darkness (2015).

== Personal life and education ==
Pérez grew up in East Texas, approximately 20 minutes away from New London, Texas, the setting of Out of Darkness.

Pérez attended the University of Texas at Austin. In 2014, she earned a Ph.D. from Indiana University Bloomington, where she studied comparative literature with a focus on Latin American literature.

Pérez currently lives in Columbus, Ohio with her two sons.

== Career ==
Early in her career, Pérez taught English Language Arts at César E. Chávez High School in Houston, which is where she "—as a white woman—became passionate about stories that center Latinx lives."

Aside from writing, Pérez is an assistant professor in the Department of Comparative Studies at The Ohio State University. In her research, she "is interested in the ethical implications of how we tell, read, mediate, and interpret narratives."

== Books ==
=== The Knife and the Butterfly (2011) ===
The Knife and the Butterfly is a young adult novel published in 2011 by Carolrhoda Books. The novel, which explores the lives of two teenage gang members in Houston, a Hispanic boy named Azael and a White girl named Lexi, is based on the 2006 death of Gabriel Granillo. The title originates from the Houston Chronicle series The Butterfly and the Knife, which chronicled the case. Pérez switched the order of the words "Knife" and "Butterfly" in order to attract male readers. Copyrights do not extend to titles, so Pérez was able to use the Chronicle title.

=== What Can(t) Wait (2011) ===
What Can(t) Wait is a young adult novel published in 2011 by Carolrhoda Lab. The story portrays a Mexican American teenage girl living in Houston who is torn between the demands of her family and her ambitions for the future. Karen Coats of The Bulletin of the Center for Children's Books wrote that this novel portrays how many immigrant families do not want their teenagers to absorb Americanized attitudes even though the immigrants came to the U.S. to get a better life.

=== Out of Darkness (2015) ===
Out of Darkness is a historical young adult novel published September 1, 2015 by Carolrhoda Lab. The novel chronicles a love affair between a teenage Mexican-American girl and a teenage African-American boy in 1930s New London, Texas, occurring right up to the 1937 New London School explosion.

Perez initially expected to receive pushback for Out of the Darkness but did not receive any for the first several years following publication; instead, the book was well-received by critics and won a few national awards. However, in 2021, the book became the fourth-most banned and challenged book in the United States in 2021, according to the American Library Association's Office for Intellectual Freedom. Challengers "[b]anned, challenged, and restricted" the book because of its "depictions of abuse and because it was considered to be sexually explicit."

== Awards and honors ==
In 2012, the American Library Association (ALA) nominated What Can(t) Wait for the annual list of Quick Picks for Reluctant Young Adult Readers. In 2015, the selected The Knife and the Butterfly for their list of Popular Paperbacks for Young Adults. In 2016, they included Out of Darkness on their list of the year's Best Fiction for Young Adults. The following year, Booklist included it on their list of the "50 Best YA Books of All Time".

Year	Title	Award	Result	Ref.
2013	"3:17"	Observer short story contest	Winner	
2016	Out of Darkness	Américas Award	Winner	
2016	Out of Darkness	Amelia Elizabeth Walden Award	Finalist	
2016	Out of Darkness	Michael L. Printz Award	Honor	
2016	Out of Darkness	Tomás Rivera Mexican-American Children's Book Award	Winner	

== Publications ==
=== Novels ===
- The Knife and the Butterfly (2011)
- What Can’t Wait (2011)
- Out of Darkness (2015)

=== Short stories and essay ===
- "The 'Nice Girl' Feminist" in Here We Are: Feminism for the Real World, edited by Kelly Jensen (2017)
- "5 Tips for 'Nice Girl' Feminists" in Here We Are: Feminism for the Real World, edited by Kelly Jensen (2017)
- "What Home Is" in Rural Voices: 15 Authors Challenge Assumptions About Small-Town America, edited by Nora Shalaway Carpenter (2020)
