= Out of Darkness (novel) =

2015 historical young adult novel by Ashley Hope Pérez

- Author: Ashley Hope Pérez
- Language: English
- Genre: Young adult fiction, Historical fiction
- Publisher: Carolrhoda Lab
- Publication date: September 1, 2015
- ISBN: 9781467742023

Out of Darkness is a historical young adult novel by Ashley Hope Pérez, published September 1, 2015 by Carolrhoda Lab. The novel chronicles a love affair between a teenage Mexican-American girl and a teenage African-American boy in 1930s New London, Texas, occurring right up to the 1937 New London School explosion.

Juan Castillo of NBC News wrote that Out of Darkness "stares unflinchingly at racism, classism, segregation and the people who live on the margins of society."

== Background ==
Pérez grew up in a community in proximity to New London. An alumna of the University of Texas at Austin, she teaches literature at Ohio State University, and she previously taught at César Chávez High School in Houston. She chose to write historical fiction as it was something different from her previous work.

== Plot ==
The novel begins with the school explosion and then recounts prior events, beginning in September 1936. Seventeen-year old Naomi Vargas, a high school senior who originates from San Antonio, moves in with her oil field worker stepfather. She becomes friends and falls in love with Wash Fuller, an African-American boy. Naomi deals with overt racism in New London and her history of abuse from her stepfather. After the explosion occurs, the townspeople blame Wash for the disaster.

Wash and his father narrowly avoid being lynched by the townspeople. Naomi tries to escape with Wash and his family, but she is discovered by her stepfather. Her stepfather rapes her, and she and Wash are killed. Naomi's brother, Beto, kills the stepfather and escapes.

== Contents ==
The book includes various pages colored black and some black-and-white photographs. In the sections before the plot's climax the pages have increasing amounts of white space.

== Characters ==
The four primary characters are:

- Wash Fuller – An African American senior (final year of senior high school) student, Wash is the son of the principal of New London Colored School. When he begins dating Naomi, he stops his previous womanizing ways. Pérez describes him as "funny, loyal and passionate".
- Naomi Vargas – She is a shy character, Mexican-American and new in town. The author characterizes her as being quieter than Wash.
- Roberto "Beto" and Caridad "Cari" – Twins who are Naomi's half-siblings
- Henry – Naomi's stepfather who sexually abused Naomi as a child. He is a White American who became a born-again Christian; he wishes to atone for his past sins, and reunite his family. Previously he was not present in Naomi's life.
- The Gang – A group of white students who are racist, and sexual predators.

== Reception ==
Upon publication, Out of Darkness was generally well-received by critics, including starred reviews from Kirkus Reviews and School Library Journal. Kirkus Reviews called the book a "powerful, layered tale of forbidden love in times of unrelenting racism." School Library Journal said the book "resonates with fear, hope, love, and the importance of memory. ... Set against the backdrop of an actual historical event, Pérez's young adult novel gives voice to many long-omitted facets of U.S. history."

Booklist praised the "skillful use of multiple perspectives," saying that "[e]legant prose and gently escalating action will leave readers gasping for breath at the tragic climax and moving conclusion." NBC News wrote, "Early reviews have been flattering, suggesting Pérez is positioned to continue her run of success in the Young Adult genre."

The audiobook, read by Benita Robledo and Lincoln Hoppe, received a starred review from Booklist, who said, "Robledo narrates beautifully, capturing the family member’s individual personalities." They further highlighted that "Robledo also flawlessly integrates Spanish words and phrases into her narration." Conversely, Booklist found the Hoppe's sections depicting "the Gang [that] represents the collective voice of the intolerant" "terrifying," saying, "His low, growling, threatening tone perfectly illustrates the collective hatred and malicious intent flowing from the Gang. His narration gives gravitas to this beautiful, heartbreaking story of a tumultuous time in our country’s history."

=== Awards and honors ===
In 2015, Out of the Darkness was included on Kirkus Reviews's "Best Teen Historical Fiction of 2015" list, and in 2017, Booklist included it on their "50 Best YA Books of All Time" list.

Awards for Out of Darkness
Year	Award	Result	Ref.
2016	Amelia Elizabeth Walden Award	Finalist	
2016	Américas Award	Winner	
2016	Tomás Rivera Mexican-American Children's Book Award	Winner	
2016	Michael L. Printz Award	Honor	

=== Censorship in the United States ===
Perez initially expected to receive pushback for Out of Darkness but didn't receive any for the first several years following publication. However, the book became the fourth-most banned and challenged book in the United States in 2021 and the ninth-most banned and challenged book in 2022, according to the American Library Association's Office for Intellectual Freedom. Challengers "[b]anned, challenged, and restricted" the book because of its "depictions of abuse and because it was considered to be sexually explicit."

On September 15, 2021, the book was challenged at a Lake Travis Independent School District board meeting in Austin, Texas, by a parent who interrupted a board meeting to request that the book be removed from the libraries of the district’s two middle schools due to sexually explicit content including anal sex. The following day, a district spokesperson told KXAN the book was removed from its two middle schools, Hudson Bend Middle School and Bee Cave Middle School, and that its contents would be reviewed with respect to board policy. The video of the parent's challenge spread, going so far as to be shared on Jimmy Kimmel Live! Perez responded to the incident, stating that the quoted passage was taken out of context; Perez explained that the "words are from the voice of the racist boys, objectifying the main character, laying claim to her and her sexuality. The book is actually critiquing all of that. I was including the reality of what the (Mexican-American) character has to navigate.” Perez also stated that she wondered whether the critique was toward the racism of the 1930s rather than profane language.

On November 19, 2021, the Keller Independent School District in Keller, Texas decided to the book would only be available in the high school "[b]ecause of the violence and difficult imagery in this book." Further, the book is not available on shelves, and students must receive parental consent to check the book out.

In December 2021, the book was challenged by a parent at the Washington School District Board Meeting in St. George, Utah. After reviewing the book in its entirety, the school district voted to remove the book from school libraries because of profanity and sexually explicit content. On February 2, 2022, the school district released a letter to parents stating that the School District "has opted to return the books to the shelves in order to allow the District to fine-tune our policies and better align them with state and federal court rulings."

In August 2022, Out of Darkness was listed among 52 books banned by the Alpine School District of Utah following the implementation of Utah law H.B. 374, “Sensitive Materials In Schools" Many of the books were removed because they were considered to contain pornographic material according to the new law, which defines porn using the following criteria:

- "The average person" would find that the material, on the whole, "appeals to prurient interest in sex"
- The material "is patently offensive in the description or depiction of nudity, sexual conduct, sexual excitement, sadomasochistic abuse, or excretion"
- The material, on the whole, "does not have serious literary, artistic, political or scientific value."

== See also ==
Other novels by Pérez:

- What Can't Wait
- The Knife and the Butterfly
