= What Can't Wait =

2011 young adult novel by Ashley Hope Pérez

- Cover
- Author: Ashley Hope Pérez
- Language: English
- Genre: Young adult fiction
- Set in: Houston
- Publisher: Carolrhoda Lab
- Publication date: March 1, 2011
- Publication place: United States
- Media type: Print
- Pages: 240 pp
- ISBN: 978-0-7613-6155-8
- OCLC: 656847496

What Can't Wait is a young adult novel by Ashley Hope Pérez, published by Carolrhoda Lab in 2011. The story portrays a Mexican American teenage girl living in Houston who is torn between the demands of her family and her ambitions for the future. Karen Coats of The Bulletin of the Center for Children's Books wrote that this novel portrays how many immigrant families do not want their teenagers to absorb Americanized attitudes even though the immigrants came to the U.S. to get a better life. This is the author's first novel.

Juan Castillo of NBC News wrote that this book and another one of Pérez's novels, The Knife and the Butterfly, explore what it means to grow up as a Hispanic or Latino teenager in the United States "amid difficult circumstances."

The book was released on March 1, 2011.

== Plot ==
The main character, 17-year old Marisa Moreno, comes from a Mexican American family, and resides in a Hispanic neighborhood in Houston, Texas. Her immigrant father wants Marisa to help the family by working longer hours at a grocery store and help take care of her sister's child, since her sister was medically uninsured and needs to work longer hours in order to pay her husband's medical bills. Even though Marisa wants to study engineering, and attend the University of Texas at Austin, her father tells her that women should not be involved in mathematics-related professions. In the story Marisa applies to the engineering program at UT Austin, and is accepted, but her family feels it is far away from home.

Marisa's teacher, boyfriend, and mother try to convince her to fight for a more promising future. At one time a student attempts to rape Marisa. Marisa, stretched thin by her obligations and ultimate goals, experiences conflict, but then learns to prioritize her own goals. Publishers Weekly stated that "Marisa is aware that pursuing a life that's fulfilling on her own terms comes with a price" and that she makes a "bittersweet decision". She ultimately goes to university and leaves Houston.

Georgia Christgau of Middle College High School at LaGuardia Community College in New York City wrote that the attempted sexual assault scene is "too quickly drawn to be convincing." Publishers Weekly stated that the novel's coverage of teenage pregnancy was "sensitive". Katrina Hedeen of The Horn Book Guide wrote that the ending was "too-tidy". Kirkus Reviews, however, describes the ending as "hopeful but never too-tidy". Publishers Weekly described the ending as "honest and satisfying".

== Characters ==
- Marisa Moreno - She is a 12th grade student taking Advanced Placement Calculus, and working at a Kroger.
  - According to the author, the main character is not based on any particular student. Courtney Jones of Booklist wrote that Marisa is "a relatable character who is unraveling under the pressure to support her family at the expense of her dreams" and that the author does this by focusing on her determination against her parents' disapproval.
- Marisa's father - He openly protests Marisa's plans, believing that "Girls and numbers don’t mix." He has poor English fluency, and the Engineering Business Journal describes him as a "mean man".
- Marisa's mother - Initially she quietly protests Marisa's plans. Coats stated that while Marisa's mother does not openly challenge her husband, she encourages Marisa to run away to obtain her goals, and therefore in a way help her family by inspiring Anita; therefore this makes the mother a "quiet hero".
- Gustavo Moreno - Marisa's older brother, who considers Marisa a nerd and has machismo. He does not work.
- Cecilia "Ceci" Moreno - Marisa's older sister, Ceci had a child at age 17, while she was still a high school student. She has marital problems that force Marisa to take care of Anita.
- Anita - Marisa's five year old niece
- Alan Peralta - Alan, Marisa's new boyfriend, sometimes has difficulty understanding her struggle. He has a sister who became pregnant in high school.
  - Christgau wrote that Alan and Brenda both serve as comic relief and also support Marisa. Catherine M. Andronik, a library media specialist at Brien McMahon High School in Norwalk, Connecticut, characterized Alan as being "understanding" of Marisa's situation.
- Brenda Zepeda - Marisa's best friend. There is a subplot where a student regarded as a "stud" pursues Brenda.
- Ms. Ford - Marisa's teacher promotes studying at the university but she does not understand what cultural conflict would result from this
- Pedro - He attempts to rape Marisa.

== Background ==
The author, a graduate of the University of Texas at Austin, served in Teach for America, and worked as a teacher at Chávez High School in Houston. The neighborhood depicted in this novel is similar to the real neighborhood around Chávez High. Marisa's high school's sports team is the "Loyal Lobos", and Chávez High's real-life mascot is the "Lobos". In the acknowledgements section, Pérez thanked the students of Chávez High.

As of 2011 Pérez was a PhD student at the University of Indiana.

Francesca Goldsmith of Voice of Youth Advocates wrote that author was a "product" of a neighborhood similar to Marisa's. The author wrote this novel after the students at her high school told her that they did not know of any novel that described their experiences.

== Writing style ==
Goldsmith wrote that the author "folds in Spanish without awkwardly translating each instance" and uses a "fluid and literary" narrative style.

== Reception ==
Castillo wrote that this novel was "acclaimed".

Coats wrote that "This is a timely, realistic, and unflinching portrayal".

Christgau wrote that it was a "strong first novel".

Goldsmith wrote that What Can't Wait is an "excellent story" for "Marisa's peers" and other American teenagers.

Andronik wrote that "Marisa’s gritty, compassionately related story will resonate with teens in immigrant communities." She stated that the book may be appropriate for older high school students since it includes profanity and an attempted rape scene.

Hedeen wrote that the "gritty setting and hard-knocks characters carry the story" and that the author had an authentic perspective of Mexican-American culture.

Jones wrote that by focusing on determination against her parents' disapproval, the author avoids clichés and created a "solid debut" that "has the potential to become a book version of Stand and Deliver".

Kirkus Reviews concluded that the book is "Un magnifico debut" that gives "Marisa an authentic voice that smoothly blends Spanish phrases into dialogue and captures the pressures of both Latina life and being caught between two cultures."

== See also ==
- History of Mexican Americans in Houston

Other works by Pérez:

- The Knife and the Butterfly - Set in Houston
- Out of Darkness

Non-fiction about Mexican-Americans in Houston:

- Brown, Not White
- The Church in the Barrio
- Ethnicity in the Sunbelt
