= Ali Irsan =

Jordanian-American convicted murderer

Ali Mahmood Awad Irsan
- Photograph by the Texas Department of Criminal Justice (TDCJ)
- Born: December 27, 1957 (age 68); Jordan
- Spouses: Robin Dahl (m. 1979; div. 1994) Shmou Ali Al Rawabdeh (m. 1994)
- Children: 12, including: Nasemah Rachelle Irsan; Nadia Irsan; Nesreen Irsan Beavers; Nasim Irsan
- Conviction: Capital murder (2 counts)
- Penalty: Death (August 2018)

Details
- Victims: Gelareh Bagherzadeh; Coty Beavers
- Date: January 15, 2012 (Bagherzadeh); November 12, 2012 (Beavers)
- Locations: Houston (Bagherzadeh) unincorporated Harris County, Texas (Beavers)
- Weapon: .38-caliber handgun

Ali Mahmood Awad Irsan (Arabic: علي محمود عوض عرسان; born December 27, 1957) is a Jordanian-American convicted murderer held on Texas death row. He was sentenced for the murders of Iranian-American activist Gelareh Bagherzadeh (Persian: گلاره باقرزاده), a friend of one of his daughters; and his son-in-law, Coty Beavers, in Greater Houston.

Multiple media reports described the crimes as honor killings.

== Background ==
=== Ali Irsan and his family ===
Ali Irsan was born to a father in the Jordanian Army.

Irsan, using a student visa, came to the United States in 1979, and became a naturalized United States citizen. He lived on a 3-acre (1.2 ha) property in a rural area, in unincorporated eastern Montgomery County, Texas, near Conroe. Craig Malisow of the Houston Press stated that Irsan "considered himself to be a devout Muslim." Irsan studied in a "medical laboratory" program at Kirkwood Community College. He stated in court filings that he studied in a medical program at a tertiary institution in Jordan, and he also stated that he had a Houston Community College "diploma of auto-mechanic".

Irsan, then 22, married his first wife when she was 17. He and Robin Dahl first met in 1979 in Cedar Rapids, Iowa, while he studied in community college and she worked on her GED. They married circa 1980, and moved to the Houston area by 1984. The couple had four children, with their first being born in 1981. In 1994 Irsan divorced his first wife.

When Irsan was 35, he traveled to Jordan and entered into an arranged marriage with a girl, Shmou Ali Alrawabdeh (Arabic: شمو علي الروابدة), who was approximately 15 or 16. His first wife left the house shortly after he brought home his second wife. Alrawabdeh, a Jordanian national, arrived in the U.S. circa 1995. In federal court, Irsan stated that he married her in Jordan but that he did not legally marry her in the United States. Alrawabdeh had eight children with him while they lived in the United States; including those from his other wife, the total number of children known to be fathered by Irsan is 12. She naturalized as a U.S. citizen in 2001.

In 1999, Irsan killed Amjad Hussein Alidam (Arabic: أمجد حسین علي دام), the husband of Nasemah Rachelle Irsan (Arabic: نسيمة راشیل عرسان), Irsan's eldest daughter, at Irsan's residence. Alidam was an Iraqi immigrant to the U.S. and a Shia Muslim. Irsan (who was a Sunni Muslim and did not approve of the marriage) stated that he shot Alidam in the head with a shotgun in self-defense. Irsan never received criminal charges in that case, as area law enforcement believed him to be innocent. A Montgomery County grand jury did not indict Irsan for Alidam's murder. Nasemah was sent back to Jordan, where she remarried; she later returned to the U.S. with her new husband.

=== Nesreen Irsan Beavers, Nadia Irsan, Gelareh Bagherzadeh, and Coty Beavers ===
Two of Irsan's daughters, Nadia (Arabic: نادیا علي عرسان; born 1984), and Nesreen (Arabic: نسرین عرسان; born 1988), were children of Irsan's first wife. Nadia is a U.S. citizen, and the family had previously educated them through homeschooling. After Irsan suffered a heart attack and was diagnosed with a heart condition, Nesreen and Nadia were able to convince their father to allow them to go to medical school to become doctors and ensure their father's health would be properly maintained. To their surprise, Irsan allowed Nadia and Nesreen to enroll in a tertiary institution, a biology program at Lone Star College-Montgomery. Candace Strang, a professor at Lone Star who taught the women, stated that, as paraphrased by Malislow in a Houston Press article, Nadia and Nesreen "fought hard to convince their father to let them enroll". While there, Nesreen and her older sister, Nadia, met Coty Beavers and his twin brother, Cory. Beavers was a Christian, while the girls were Muslims; at the time, both girls wore hijabs. Within a few months, the girls began taking off their hijabs and wearing makeup at school. Nesreen very quickly fell in love with Coty Beavers, and the two began secretly dating. While Nesreen initially had the help and support of her older sister, Nadia, after Nadia's romantic feelings for Coty's twin brother, Cory, were not returned, Nadia quickly became jealous of her sister's new relationship and retreated into the role of dutiful daughter to Irsan.

The two women and Cory Beavers were admitted to the molecular genetics program at University of Texas MD Anderson Cancer Center in the Texas Medical Center; at MD Anderson, Nesreen met Gelareh Bagherzadeh, an Iranian woman. Bagherzadeh, a medical student and medical researcher, had molecular genetics as her area of study. She was born in France and was from Tehran. She studied biology in Tehran and later attended university in Budapest, Hungary, before moving to Houston in 2007 to join her parents, who bought a house near Uptown Houston (the area around the Houston Galleria) so she could live there; this residence was within the Woodway Point townhomes, where a nearby street would become the site of her death. Nesreen introduced Coty Beavers's twin brother, Cory, to Bagherzadeh.

Bagherzadeh was known to publicly protest in favor of women's rights on numerous occasions, and publicly criticized the Iranian government. She participated in the 2009 Iranian presidential election protests that were held in Houston and also protested against the Al-Hadi Mosque, which she accused of being connected to the Iranian government. Lomi Kriel of the Houston Chronicle wrote that "she was outspokenly critical of Islam, even becoming embroiled in an argument with her father's bosses about their faith." She was a member of Second Baptist Church, having converted to Christianity in 2011. When Nesreen chose to leave Islam and become a Christian, Bagherzadeh gave her support, suggesting that Nesreen marry her love, Coty Beavers.

Irsan had earlier told his daughters that they were not allowed to date. According to court testimony, Irsan threatened the girls with death if they engaged in romantic relationships, and also stated he would kill their boyfriends if that were ever the case. The relationship between Nesreen and Nadia deteriorated. Nesreen later found employment at MD Anderson Cancer Center.

=== Kidnapping, escape, harassment, and marriage ===
Irsan learned about Nesreen's relationship with Beavers while he was in Jordan with his son. In June 2011, his wife, Alrawabdeh, held Nesreen against her will at Irsan's residence; Nesreen accused her sister Nadia of also holding her against her will. The family members holding her captive had discovered e-mails, text messages, and voice mails sent to and from Coty Beavers on Nesreen's communication device. She escaped through a window and went to join Beavers at his residence, then at his mother's house in Spring. In November 2011, Coty's brother, Cory, and Bagherzadeh became romantically involved.

Nesreen had stated she was afraid her father would harm her. Her father and other members of the family searched for her and sent messages to Bagherzadeh, who refused to divulge any information. For a time, Irsan remained unaware of the location of Nesreen's residence. However, beginning around fall 2011, Irsan began to harass Nesreen, Coty Beavers, and Bagherzadeh, and the group experienced acts of vandalism against their property. Nesreen, who was 23 at the time, got a protective order that banned her father from contacting her, but he continued to look for her. For those reasons, she chose not to attend the graduation ceremony for her class.

Around July 2012, Nesreen married Coty Beavers, taking the name Nesreen Irsan Beavers, and holding only a civil ceremony to avoid unwanted attention, doing so at the Harris County Courthouse. The two moved to a new residence a significant distance away from their previous one; they were at the Legacy Park Apartments in unincorporated northwest Harris County, which would become the site of Beavers' death. Nesreen and Beavers chose a gated apartment complex, specifically for their protection; they rented a third-floor unit to minimize their possibility of being attacked. Whenever Nesreen left the apartment to travel to and from work, Beavers escorted her to her car to protect her. He also had an assault rifle in case he needed self-defense.

In an interview with the Houston Chronicle, Nesreen stated that, historically, law enforcement in the Houston area had difficulty dealing with honor crimes, as they did not understand the culture, and the ramifications for violating honor codes.

=== Federal fraud convictions ===
Nesreen told authorities that Irsan had committed fraud related to Social Security. The family received money from the Social Security Administration (SSA), called Supplemental Security Income (SSI), for disabled children, and for adults who are unable to work and do not have resources, but Irsan and his family concealed their resources, while telling the government that, beginning in 1990, he was unable to work due to fibromyalgia and chronic fatigue syndrome. Irsan held his money in multiple bank accounts, some in Jordan, with some under the names of his children while having de facto control over them, while also receiving welfare payments and concealing the true amount of money he controlled. He also possessed multiple fraudulent credit cards, some under false names and some in the names of family members. The criminal schemes began in 1995. Agencies investigating these financial crimes included multiple agencies in the federal, state, and local levels, among them the FBI, SSA, the Office of Inspector General (OIG), Homeland Security Investigations, and the Montgomery County Sheriff's Office.

FBI agents, accompanied by local police, arrested Irsan, Alrawabdeh, and Nadia on May 22, 2014, on offenses related to fraud perpetrated against the Social Security system. Irsan was held without bail in the Joe Corley Detention Facility/Joe Corley Processing Center, a private correctional facility in Conroe, Texas, operated by the GEO Group which, in addition to housing immigration prisoners, acts as a detention center for the U.S. Marshals Service. All three suspects were also held at Federal Detention Center, Houston in Downtown Houston. Alrawabdeh and Nadia were also held. Six of Irsan's children who were still minors were put in the custody of child protective services (CPS).

The AUSA assigned federal prosecutors Jim McAlister and Mark McIntyre, Irsan was represented by attorney John Floyd. The FBI raided the house again on June 5, 2014. Irsan was initially charged with conspiracy to commit welfare fraud in a continuing scheme, to defraud the United States, and to commit theft of public money over $1,000.

On April 3, 2015, Irsan pleaded guilty, to "conspiracy to defraud the United States", while Alrawabdeh and Nadia were convicted of "making false statements". Irsan was sentenced to 45 months' confinement and a fine of $290,651 by Judge Lynn Hughes. Alrawabdeh and Nadia each received 24 months.

The arrests and prosecutions were not covered in the Jordanian news media.

== Murders ==
Map of Houston showing the locations of the murders of Bagherzadeh and Beavers

=== Bagherzadeh's murder ===
Bagherzadeh was murdered while in her father's car, outside of her parents' residence on January 15, 2012. Bagherzadeh was 30 at the time of her death. The triggerman, using a .38-caliber handgun, shot Bagherzadeh through Alrawabdeh's passenger side window, hitting Bagherzadeh in the head with one bullet that went through the passenger side window of the car she drove. Alrawabdeh stated that Nasim Irsan (Arabic: نسیم عرسان), Irsan's son, was the shooter.

Bagherzadeh was driving home while talking on the telephone with a former boyfriend. Up to three other bullets were fired at her car. Police found her body around 12:30 a.m.; a shooting had first been reported around 11:45 p.m. Prosecutors stated that Irsan, Alrawabdeh, and Nasim Irsan were together in a car. At 12:30 a.m. a Texas Department of Public Safety (DPS) officer stopped the car going 79 miles per hour, above the speed limit, on Interstate 45, while returning to Montgomery County. Irsan was given a warning and allowed to leave after he stated he was trying to get a drink to deal with a diabetic condition. Initially no leads were announced, and Crime Stoppers stated that there was a $250,000 reward for information that could solve the case. Craig Malisow of the Houston Press described the sum as a "record-high award". Shortly after the killings, Bagherzadeh's allies and friends believed that the Iranian government had had Bagherzadeh assassinated. Authorities had questioned Ali Irsan, as Nesreen had stated he was a culprit, but authorities did not keep him in custody as they lacked sufficient evidence.

=== Beavers's murder ===
Coty Beavers was murdered at his residence at the Legacy Park apartments, on November 12, 2012. He was 28 at the time of his death. According to Alrawabdeh, Irsan personally shot Beavers. He had entered the apartment while it was unlocked and stayed inside while Beavers was with Nesreen; Beavers went with her to her car, before she drove away to her workplace, around 5:45 a.m. Irsan shot him after Beavers re-entered the house. Irsan was in hiding inside a bedroom before he killed his victim, with five or more bullets. Alwarabdeh was also present at Beavers's murder. According to court testimony, Irsan had anticipated that Nesreen would be with him and intended to kill her too. Nesreen found Beavers's body, at about 4:30 p.m.

Two days prior to the killing, according to the Harris County Sheriff's Office (HCSO), a suspect asked people in Legacy Park for the whereabouts of Beavers. Cory Beavers told the news channel KPRC that his brother "said basically if I'm ever killed or murdered it was Ali Irsan. I mean he was that specific about it." Beavers's mother, Shirley McCormick, stated at Irsan's trial that "We knew who was responsible, but we didn't know who all had helped him. I told [the police officers] it was Ali Irsan, and he also had to be the one who killed Gelareh."

=== Motive ===
Prosecutors of the Harris County government stated that Nesreen's conversion and marrying a Christian man motivated the father to commit the murders. In her court testimony, Alrawabdeh stated that Irsan planned to also kill Nesreen, Cory Beavers, and the Beavers twins' mother. She stated "If a girl ran away from home, it would bring disgrace to the family." Stating that the difference in religion and the element of premarital sex would reflect poorly on Irsan, Alrawabdeh stated, "I'm from an Arabic country and I'm aware of the culture. The family would kill her to [regain] their honor." According to prosecutors, Irsan wished to kill Nesreen's loved ones first to inflict emotional distress on her, before killing her at a later date. Devon Anderson, the Harris County district attorney in 2015, stated that Irsan "believed that [Nesreen] and others, including the two victims, had violated his honor as a Muslim."

== Prosecution ==
=== Investigation, arrest, and pre-trial detention ===
Officers of the Harris County Sheriff's Office (HCSO) searched Irsan's residence nine days after Beavers's death. The Federal Bureau of Investigation (FBI) conducted surveillance on the suspects. On May 22, 2014, the day Irsan was arrested on federal fraud charges, Harris County prosecutors announced that Irsan was also being charged for Bagherzadeh's murder. By March 2015 those charges were dismissed, but the Harris County authorities stated they would file additional charges. Harris County district attorney Anderson did not say why the initial charges were dropped with newer ones later filed; Michael Barajas of the Houston Press stated "It appears that decision was purely strategic". After prosecutors established the connection between the two killings, new capital murder charges against Irsan were filed on April 22, 2015, charging him with the murders of both Bagherzadeh and Beavers. According to Texas state law, capital murder can be filed if two killings are connected as part of the same scheme. Irsan's lawyers stated that he had no connection to either murder and the circumstances of the murders were not known. They also stated that the murders of Bagherzadeh and Beavers were not connected.

The federal government continued to hold Irsan, Alrawabdeh, and Nadia while Harris County prosecutors announced new criminal charges in 2015. Nadia Irsan received charges accusing her of stalking her sister, a felony of the third degree; the maximum possible sentence, if convicted, would be 10 years. Prosecutors can file murder charges against her if they find that she had helped plan any murders, due to the law of parties statutes. Nasim, charged with Bagherzadeh's murder, was arrested on April 22, 2015, and subsequently moved to the Harris County jail; he was 21 at the time. His bail was set at $500,000. Alwarabdeh also was charged with Bagherzadeh's murder, as she had allowed the triggerman to use her window to kill Bagherzadeh. By May 1, 2015, Nadia remained in federal incarceration while her father and stepmother were moved to the Harris County jail. In the courtroom, Irsan asked for the state to not notify the Jordanian government, citing that he was a citizen of the United States. Later in 2015 Nadia was moved to the Harris County Jail, and she was given house arrest in January 2017 with a $250,000 bail. Texas State District Judge Jan Krocker scheduled Nadia's stalking trial for July 2017. In the meantime, Krocker chose house arrest, since Nadia had only been accused of stalking.

After state criminal charges had been announced, an anonymous person claiming to be one of Irsan's children created a petition stating that "racial prejudice and discrimination" had victimized the family. While Montgomery County authorities stated they were re-investigating the 1999 death of Alidam, they would only file charges on the matter if new evidence was presented.

=== Murder trial and sentencing ===
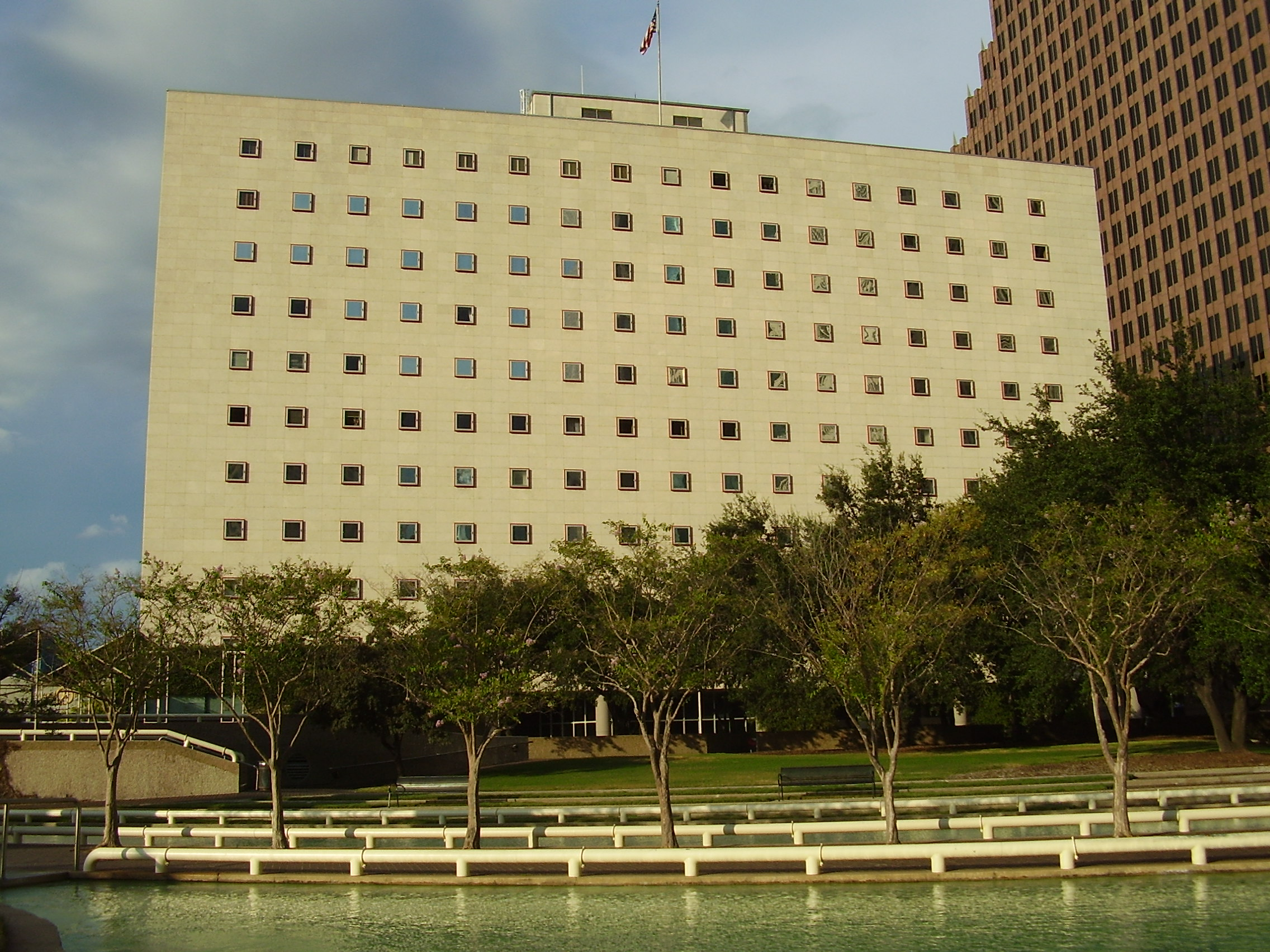
The Bob Casey Federal Courthouse in Downtown Houston, the site of the capital murder trial of Ali Irsan, prosecuted by the State of Texas

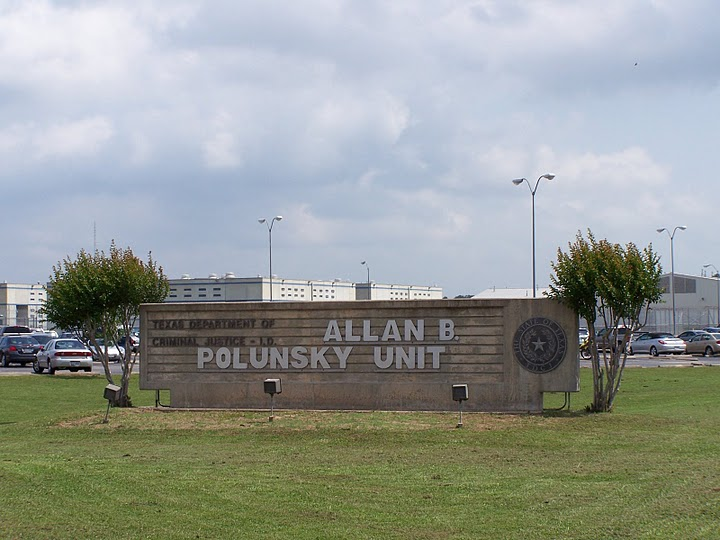
Allan B. Polunsky Unit near Livingston, Texas, houses the State of Texas death row for men.

Irsan's capital murder trial began on June 25, 2018. It was held at the Bob Casey Federal Courthouse in Downtown Houston. The normal venue for state felony cases, the Harris County Criminal Courthouse in Downtown, had sustained damage from Hurricane Harvey in 2017, and the post-storm restoration was not yet complete.

The prosecutors sought the death penalty against Irsan, making it the first death penalty prosecution in Houston in 2018, and also the first death penalty case during the tenure of Kim Ogg, the Harris County district attorney since January 1, 2017. Anna Emmons, Marie Primm, and Jon Stephenson were appointed special prosecutors, since Ogg's first assistant, prior to the beginning of the murder trial, represented a suspected co-conspirator in another case; Ogg recused. Allen Tanner and Rudy Duarte were attorneys appointed by the judge to represent Irsan, while Katherine Scardino was the attorney appointed for Alrawabdeh. Jan Krocker served as the state district judge.

Nesreen testified against her father, as did Cory Beavers, who lost his twin brother and girlfriend, and McCormick, who lost her son. Alrawabdeh entered into a plea deal that gave her a conviction of kidnapping instead of murder, and as part of the plea deal she testified against Irsan. Alrawabdeh was to be released with time served after the end of the trial. In 2019 prosecutors stated that her case is still open so long as she has additional testimony to give. In addition Robin Dahl, Irsan's first wife, testified against him, and first daughter Nesemah testified against her father. Two younger sisters of Irsan flew from Jordan to the U.S. to testify in his favor. Other relatives resident in Jordan used Skype to communicate with the court. Arabic translators translated testimony from people who lacked English fluency. Two sons of Irsan also testified in favor of their father. Even though his lawyers asked him not to, Irsan testified in his own trial.

On July 26, 2018, the jury convicted Irsan after only 35 minutes of deliberation. The sentencing phase lasted two weeks as the same jury deliberated between life without parole or the death penalty. Prosecutors presented a witness who accused Irsan of boasting about murdering Alidam without consequence in 1999. Nesreen testified that Irsan used severe corporal punishment, and that he praised the September 11, 2001, attacks and suicide bombings while living in the United States.

On August 14, 2018, following nine hours of deliberations, the jury voted to execute Irsan. Irsan went into the custody of the Texas Department of Criminal Justice (TDCJ) on August 20 of that year. His head and beard were shaved due to TDCJ policy. Men on death row in Texas are normally held at the Polunsky Unit near Livingston, Texas.

Irsan's conviction and death sentences were affirmed on direct appeal by the Texas Court of Criminal Appeals on February 26, 2025.

=== Subsequent developments ===
In August 2019, Nasim Irsan, already in correctional custody for more than four years, reached a plea deal: he pleaded guilty to murder instead of capital murder and received a 40-year sentence, with time off for time already served. He may apply for parole around 2039. Alwarabdeh refused to testify against Nasim, and prosecutors stated this complicated their case against him.

In November 2019, prosecutors filed a charge of conspiracy to commit murder against Nadia, with the potential sentencing range, if convicted, from 15 years to life imprisonment. She refused a potential plea deal, which involved the stalking charge being dropped. Marie Primm, who served as the prosecutor pro tem, stated that this filing was not due to the addition of new facts, but rather due to where "the evidence took us."

In 2021, Nadia Irsan agreed to plead guilty to conspiring in a scheme of organized crime, and got ten years of probation as part of "deferred adjudication". If she completes her probation successfully, her record would not show a conviction.

== Aftermath and analysis ==
Governor of Texas Greg Abbott wrote on Twitter that people who commit honor killings in Texas would be sentenced to death in state court.

Brian Rogers of the Houston Chronicle stated that experts considered the case to be unusual because usually only the offending woman is killed in an honor killing, and that the Irsan affair increased attention given to honor killings in the United States. Michael Creed, another brother of Coty Beavers, said "You don't have to be Muslim to be a victim of an honor crime. These are not infrequent events that happen in some random part of the world. They're happening in America and they're on the rise." Beavers' father, Dennis Beavers, also stated "If we in this country are not careful, a tragedy like ours could happen to your family." Relatives of Coty Beavers and Bagherzadeh stated that they became more fearful after the murders, with Cory and another brother of Beavers having guns for protection.

On January 23, 2012, Bagherzadeh's funeral was held at Second Baptist Church. Her parents sold their Houston house and moved to Maryland, where their eldest son lived. Ebrahim Bagherzadeh, Bagherzadeh's father, stated that being in Houston reminds them of their daughter and makes them feel sad.

The Houston Crimestoppers Memorial in Midtown Houston has a memorial to Bagherzadeh.

Nesreen suggested that law enforcement allow potential victims of honor killings to change their identities to avoid being tracked down by vengeful family members.

== In media ==
The case was covered in the episode "Deadly Dishonor" in season two of the television program A Wedding and a Murder.

Dateline NBC also had a two-hour episode airing in November 2019. They later produced a podcast hosted by Josh Mankiewicz titled Motive for Murder.

In December 2022, Netflix had an episode of I am a Killer called "A Father's Shadow" featuring Ali Irsan's honor murders.

== See also ==
- Honor killings in the United States
- Capital punishment in Texas
- Crime in Houston
- Islam in Houston
- Christianity in Houston
- Yaser Abdel Said
- Murder of Tina Isa
- Murder of Noor Almaleki
