= Crime in Houston =

Houston's murder rate in 2005 ranked 46th of U.S. cities with a population over 250,000 in 2005 (per capita rate of 16.3 murders per 100,000 population). In 2010, the city's murder rate (per capita rate of 11.8 murders per 100,000 population) was ranked sixth among U.S. cities with a population of over 750,000 (behind New York City, Chicago, Detroit, Los Angeles, and Philadelphia) according to the Federal Bureau of Investigation (FBI). Houston had over 400 homicides in 2020 and 473 by the end of December 2021 a predicted increase of 30% year on year.

Murders fell by 37 percent from January to June 2011, compared with the same period in 2010. Houston's total crime rate including violent and nonviolent crimes decreased by 11 percent. The FBI's Uniform Crime Report (UCR) indicates a downward trend of violent crime in Houston over the ten- and twenty-year periods ending in 2016, which is consistent with national trends. This trend toward lower rates of violent crime in Houston includes the murder rate, though it had seen a four-year uptick that lasted through 2015. Houston's violent crime rate was 8.6% percent higher in 2016 from the previous year. However, from 2006 to 2016, violent crime was still down 12 percent in Houston. Houston had over 400 homicides in 2020 and 373 by the end of September in 2021 a predicted increase of 30% year on year.

Houston is a significant hub for trafficking of cocaine, cannabis, heroin, MDMA, and methamphetamine due to its size, and proximity to major illegal-drug exporting nations. Houston is one of the country's largest hubs for human trafficking.

In the early 1970s, Houston, Pasadena and several coastal towns were the site of the Houston mass murders, which at the time were the deadliest case of serial killing in American history.

The Houston area has over 60 law enforcement agencies with various shared and overlapping responsibilities for roles such as patrol, traffic enforcement, and investigation.

== Gangs ==
The city of Houston has a variety of street gangs such as the Los Angeles based Crips and Bloods gangs as well as Chicago based gangs. The biggest gangs include the Crips, Piru's, Gangster Disciples and Black Disciples. Latino gangs are Southwest Cholos, Brown Pride, La Tercera Crips, La Primea, MS-13, and Puro Tango Blast. A spokesperson for the gang crime division of the Houston Police Department (HPD) stated in 2008 that white gangs in Houston include biker, prison, and racist groups like the Aryan Circle, and that no predominately white Blood groups exist; there are some majority black gangs which had some white members. The Houston Press reported that year that there was a white street gang in Bacliff in Galveston County.

== Criminal legal system ==
The county courts try criminal offenses under the law of Texas; City of Houston courts do not try criminal matters.

The Harris County, Texas jails in Downtown Houston house pre-trial and misdemeanor inmates under Texas law.

Federal Detention Center, Houston houses pre-trial and short-term inmates under federal law.

Prior to 1923, Harris County took responsibility for executions of inmates in criminal cases involving the county. In 1853 the first execution in Houston took place in public at Founder's Cemetery in the Fourth Ward; initially the cemetery was the execution site, but post-1868 executions took place in the jail facilities. In 1923 the Texas state government took responsibility for all executions throughout the state.

== Incidents ==
Year	Description
1965	“The Icebox Murders”
1973	Dean Corll (serial killer also known as “The Candy Man”) and accomplice(s) committed 28 known murders during a three-year span in the 1970s in Houston and Pasadena, also within Harris County.
1991	Murder of Paul Broussard
1993	Murders of Jennifer Ertman and Elizabeth Peña
1997	Murder of Doris Angleton
2001	Andrea Yates drowned her five children to death in 2001.
2002	Murder of David Lynn Harris
2003	Susan Wright (murderer) (unincorporated Harris County)
2006	Death of Gabriel Granillo
2012	Ali Irsan (murder of Gelareh Bagherzadeh; Coty Beavers was murdered in an unincorporated area in Harris County)
2019	Unsolved shooting of Liz Barraza outside her home in Tomball
2020	Murder of Alexis Sharkey

== See also ==
- Crime in Texas
- Houston Police Department
- Harris County Sheriff's Office
