= The Knife and the Butterfly =

2011 novel by Ashley Hope Pérez

- First edition cover
- Author: Ashley Hope Pérez
- Language: English
- Genre: Young adult fiction
- Set in: Houston, Texas
- Published: 2011 by Carolrhoda Books
- Publication place: United States
- Media type: Print ebook
- Pages: 209
- ISBN: 9780761361565
- OCLC: 742305900
- Dewey Decimal: FIC
- LC Class: PZ7.P4255

The Knife and the Butterfly is a young adult novel by Ashley Hope Pérez, published in 2011 by Carolrhoda Books. The novel, which explores the lives of two teenage gang members in Houston, a Hispanic boy named Azael and a White girl named Lexi, is based on a 2006 gang-related death in that city.

== Plot ==
The novel, set in Houston, is about a 15-year old Salvadoran American MS-13 gang member named Martín "Azael" Arevalo. He wakes up in a prison cell and observes 17-year old White American Alexis "Lexi" Allen, who is member of another gang, Crazy Crew. As the novel unfolds he begins to recover his memory and learn whether the upcoming trial will be his or hers. The flashbacks make up about fifty percent of the work. Azael slowly gains sympathy for Lexi, even though he originally hates her. The book reveals that on June 16, 2011 Azael died in a gang fight in Montrose, at Ervan Chew Park. Lexi had killed him; she initially maintains self-defense at the trial, but confesses to wanting to prove herself to Crazy Crew, and that Azael was not actually trying to kill her.

== Characters ==
- Martín "Azael" Arevalo – A member of MS-13, Azael has no parents in the U.S. since his mother Rosa died after giving birth to his little sister, and his father Manuel was deported to El Salvador.
  - D. Kraus of Booklist described Azael as "a vulgar, sex-obsessed, drug-using, paint-tagging gang member".
- Alexis "Lexi" Allen – A white girl who lives in Montrose and is a student at Lamar High School
- Gabe – Azael's case worker tells the boy that he must accomplish something through observing Lexi and that Azael does not have much time to do so
- Eduardo "Eddie" Arevalo – Azael's brother
- Regina Arevalo – Azael's sister
- Pelón and Javi are Azael's friends
- Beto – Azael's uncle
- Becca – Azael's girlfriend
  - Kraus stated that Azael has difficulty in committing to his relationship to her and that his attempts to stop being a criminal revolve around her.
- Janet – Lexi's counselor
- Shauna – Lexi's mother. Lexi usually calls her by her given name
- Meemaw – Lexi's grandmother, a member of the Pentecostal Way Living Water Church
- Lucas VanVeldt – Lexi's defense attorney
- Theo – Lexi's dog

== Background ==
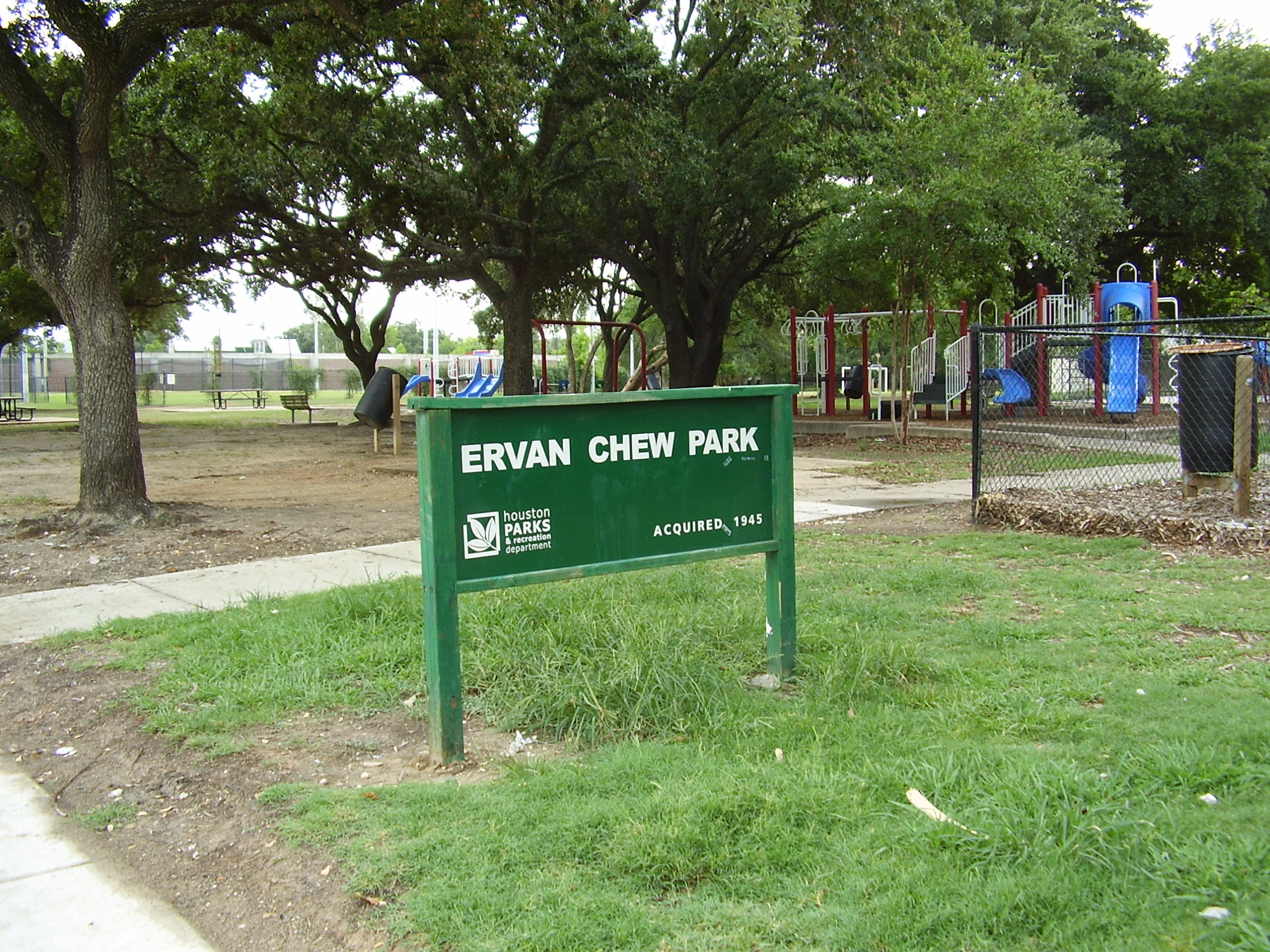
Ervan Chew Park, the site of the real life death of Gabriel Granillo, is in the book the site of Azael's death

This novel was based on the 2006 killing of Gabriel Granillo. The title originates from the Houston Chronicle series The Butterfly and the Knife, which chronicled the real life case. Pérez switched the order of the words "Knife" and "Butterfly" in order to attract male readers. Copyrights do not extend to titles, so Pérez was able to use the Chronicle title.

Pérez, a graduate of the University of Texas at Austin and a teacher at Chávez High School in Houston, researched MS-13 and Houston's Salvadoran community. One aspect in the novel is the differing use of Spanish. The younger Salvadoran Americans have influence from other Spanish dialects while the older ones have signature elements of Salvadoran Spanish such as the use of "vos".

== Reception ==
Teri Hennessy of Library Media Connection wrote that the novel "is a well-written, compelling story". Randy Ribay of The Horn Book Guide wrote that "Although the gritty voice and intriguing story builds suspense, the clichéd revelation is disappointing".

Kirkus Reviews stated that a Spanish glossary would have been good for the book, but ultimately it is "An unflinching portrait with an ending that begs for another reading." It stated "The author demonstrates why gangs appeal to many teens with family problems without glorifying the violence that often accompanies their activities." Pérez stated, "Above all, I wanted to show Azael and Lexi's world as much more than just a patchwork of crime and violence." She also stated that she wanted to show "these two teens' vulnerability and their potential for redemption" in addition to the "danger of poor choices" and the "real threat of their circumstances". Kirkus Reviews stated that Azael and Lexi are both "nuanced" even though they "could have easily become caricatures."

Juan Castillo of NBC News wrote that this book and another one of Pérez's novels, What Can't Wait, explore what it means to grow up as a Hispanic or Latino teenager in the United States "amid difficult circumstances."

Jesse Gray wrote in The ALAN Review that "Perez gives the reader sympathetic yet critical insight into the world of gangs in Houston, Texas, and is careful to show the narratives of loss that drive so many young people to join them."

Kraus stated that even though the plot would be predictable to an experienced reader, he still gave a positive review and argued the predictability is a "minor issue", concluding that the work is "An uncompromising look at two characters most readers would otherwise look away from."

== See also ==
- History of the Central Americans in Houston

Other novels by Pérez:

- What Can't Wait – set in Houston
- Out of Darkness
