= Murder of Elisabeth Mandala =

Unsolved homicide in Mexico

Elisabeth Mandala
- Born: 1992; Texas, U.S.
- Died: April–May 2010; Nuevo León, Mexico
- Cause of death: Murder
- Known for: Victim of unsolved murder

On May 1, 2010 an American woman named Elisabeth Mandala (Spring 1992 – April/May 2010) was found dead in a truck in Nuevo León, Mexico. Her murder is unsolved.

== Life ==
Mandala lived on a ranch, located in a section of Houston near the City of Sugar Land. Her father was an Italian American and her mother immigrated from Mexico to the US; they later divorced and the father moved out of her house. Mandala had an older sister, an older brother, and a younger sister. She was a 12th grade student at Kempner High School in Sugar Land.

Mandala worked at a Pappadeaux restaurant in Sugar Land as a waitress and later as a secretary at her father's company. She also worked as an exotic dancer at the Moments Cabaret nightclub in Pasadena, Texas, something her friends were unaware of, and paid money into an apparent online scam.

On April 27, 2010, she traveled to Mexico after getting into a car in north Houston. A group of her friends were aware of her travel plans. Her mother found that she was absent from school and text messages and Facebook messages saying that she was in Mexico and would be back. Her mother did not give her permission to travel abroad. Mandala was in contact with her father via text message, and he warned her about traveling in Mexico. On May 1 her mother reported her missing. Her body had been found in Mexico hours earlier. She died at age 18.

Carl Franzen wrote in AOL News that "details have emerged about [Mandala's] life that invite comparisons to" that of Laura Palmer, a teenage girl character in the television series Twin Peaks. Marilyn D. McShane and Ming-Li Hsieh, authors of Women and Criminal Justice, stated that Mandala wanted more excitement in her life despite her comfortable upbringing.

== Death ==
At 6:00 a.m. on May 1, 2010, Mandala was found dead in a Texas-registered Dodge Dakota pickup truck, along a Mexican federal highway, near the town of Mina in Nuevo León. Mandala was in the truck's back bench. Two men, a 44-year-old taxicab driver named Luis Angel Estrella Mondragón and a 38-year-old businessman named Dante Ruiz Siller, were in the same truck; they were Mexican citizens from Cuautitlán, State of Mexico, near Mexico City. Nuevo León authorities did not know why Estrella and Ruiz were in the state. One of the men had a lengthy criminal record and the two men had false identification. Authorities were unable to determine the relationship between Mandala and the men, Estrella and Ruiz.

The truck was discovered after it collided with another truck; the driver of the second truck did not sustain injuries. Nuevo León authorities found all three occupants died from beatings, while sustaining blows to their heads and bodies. A rock was affixed to the accelerator of the truck. Nuevo León authorities stated the crash could not have caused the deaths as it was not strong enough.

== Aftermath ==
After the case came to national media attention, speculation in the outlets stated that she came to Mexico since she wanted to become a coyote and traffic persons along the U.S.-Mexico border. Her family stated that Mandala was joking when she said she wanted to smuggle illegal immigrants, and that in fact Mandala was not trying to smuggle people. Her parents turned away reporters who traveled to their residence. After several months the media attention died down.

The Houston Police Department (HPD) and federal government authorities stated that since she was found dead in Mexico, they will not investigate the case since they lack jurisdiction. Upon the identification of Mandala's body, HPD closed its case on Mandala. Mexican authorities did not turn up any leads. The family declined to pay a private investigator funds to investigate the case since the family members had already exhausted their savings to repatriate Mandala's body.

Mandala's funeral was held at St. Theresa Catholic Church in Sugar Land, and she was buried at Forest Park Westheimer Cemetery in Houston.

McShane and Hsieh noted that this case, along with that of Ashley Paige Benton, was an example of a teenage girl who ended up in "statistical groups" atypical for that sex and age group and more typical for juvenile males, due to "perhaps bad choices" and "unpredictable behavior" despite Mandala having normalcy "in so many ways".

== See also ==
- List of unsolved murders (2000–present)
