= The Wolf in Underpants =

French comic book series

The Wolf in Underpants (French: Le Loup en slip) is a French children's book written by Wilfrid Lupano with drawings by Mayana Itoïz and Paul Cauuet, published in 2016 by Dargaud. Nathan Sacks translated the book into English, and that version was published by Graphic Universe in 2019.

The book is about a village of animals who wrongly believe that a wolf is set to attack them, but the wolf turns out to be innocent and the others realize their fears were false.

Publishers Weekly described it as a parody of The Big Bad Wolf. Henrietta Verma of Credo Reference stated that the illustration work resembled that of Richard Scarry, and that the storyline refers to "fake news".

In France the book is found in comics sections and children's sections of bookstores.

== Creation and conception ==
It is a spin-off of The Old Geezers, which featured "The Theater of the Wolf in Underpants" (French: Le théâtre du loup en slip). Itoïz had previously made paintings of wolves in underwear in a forest to calm her son, who had a fear of wolves, and the authors of The Old Geezers (Lupano and Cauuet) had inserted the character. Itoïz later proposed having a children's book series about the wolf.

== Reception ==
Verma stated that overall the book is "A winner" with a "fast-moving, amusing narrative", though she stated the end portion is "pedantic".

Kirkus Reviews praised the book for having "a timely, smart message".

Publishers Weekly praised the English version for being "sly" and that the images are "gems of comic timing and choreography".

Deborah Stevenson, a reviewer of the Bulletin of the Center for Children's Books, stated that the work was "humorous" and held interest of children who did not know of the political dimension behind the work.

In 2020 it was nominated to receive an Eisner Award.

== Sequels ==
Published in English:

- The Wolf In Underpants Freezes His Buns Off (French: Le Loup en slip se les gèle méchamment) - published in French in 2017 and in English in 2020. The book is about animals in the forest wrongly perceiving the gruff attitude of the wolf as him being a danger to them, when in fact he has benevolent intentions.
  - Kirkus Reviews praised the "timely and accessible lesson". School Library Journal stated that the book's thesis is clear to various age groups of children and that the work "mixes silliness with a social message".
- The Wolf In Underpants at Full Speed (French: Le Loup en slip, Slip Hip Hip !) - published in French in 2018 and in English in 2021. J. Caleb Mozzocco of School Library Journal stated that due to the detail in certain illustrations, the respective pages "deserve long pauses".
- The Wolf in Underpants Breaks Free (French: Le Loup en slip n'en fiche pas une) - published in French in 2019 and in English in 2022. It criticizes the idea that people who do not have a formal job are damaging society. Kirkus Reviews states that the work has "A clear message". Alec Chunn in School Library Journal stated it had "Engaging art and high appeal".
- The Wolf in Underpants Gets Some Pants (French: Le Loup en slip passe un froc), published in French in 2020 and in English in 2023. - The book is about the wolf keeping his sense of self; he tries wearing pants (trousers) when underwear becomes popular, as a means of standing out.
- The Wolf in Underpants and the Hazelnut-Cracker (Le Loup en slip dans Cache-Noisettes), - published in French in 2021 and in English in 2024
- The Wolf in Underpants Moves On (Le Loup en slip s'arrache ), published in French in 2022 and in English in 2026.

Not published in English:

- Le Lou en slip et le mystère du P silencieux, 2023
- Les lopins du lapin
- Échec et mites
- Le loup en slip : cahier d'activités et jeux idiots (activity book)
