= Graphic Universe =

American publisher

- Parent company: Lerner Publishing Group
- Founded: 2006
- Country of origin: United States
- Headquarters location: Minneapolis, Minnesota
- Publication types: Comic books
- Official website: Graphic Universe

Graphic Universe, an imprint of Lerner Publishing Group, was launched in 2006 and publishes books in graphic novel format.

== History ==
In 2006, Lerner Publishing Group created the Graphic Universe imprint for the purpose of publishing graphic novels for young and developing readers. Initial series included Graphic Myths and Legends (sequential retellings of famous myths from around the world) and Twisted Journeys (an interactive fiction series similar in nature to Choose Your Own Adventure, done in a mix of prose and comics storytelling). The imprint later began to publish a variety of foreign children's comics in translations and many award-winning creator-owned graphic novels.

== Graphic Myths and Legends ==
Graphic Myths and Legends is the first series published by Graphic Universe. There are currently a total of 27 titles in the series. The books are full-color comic retellings of famous myths from around the world, including Hercules and Amaterasu. The series has the trade byline of "Supreme artwork and storytelling." Graphic Myths and Legends is drawn and inked by some of the top artists in the industry.

=== Titles ===
- Ali Baba : Fooling the Forty Thieves
- Amaterasu : Return of the Sun
- Arthur & Lancelot : The Fight for Camelot
- Atalanta : The Race against Destiny
- Beowulf : Monster Slayer
- Demeter & Persephone : Spring Held Hostage
- Guan Yu : Blood Brothers to the End
- Hercules : The Twelve Labors
- The Hero Twins : Against the Lords of Death
- Isis & Osiris : To the Ends of the Earth
- Jason : Quest for the Golden Fleece
- King Arthur : Excalibur Unsheathed
- Marwe : Into the Land of the Dead
- Odysseus : Escaping Poseidon's Curse
- Perseus : The Hunt for Medusa's Head
- Pigling : A Cinderella Story
- Psyche & Eros : The Lady and the Monster
- Robin Hood : Outlaw of Sherwood Forest
- Sinbad : Sailing into Peril
- The Smoking Mountain : The Story of Popocatépetl and Iztaccíhuatl
- Sunjata : Warrior King of Mali
- Theseus : Battling the Minotaur
- Thor & Loki : In the Land of Giants
- Tristan & Isolde : The Warrior and the Princess
- The Trojan Horse : The Fall of Troy
- William Tell : One against an Empire
- Yu the Great : Conquering the Flood

== Twisted Journeys ==
Twisted Journeys is an interactive fiction series similar in nature to Choose Your Own Adventure, done in a mix of written and comic format. Some pages are done in a comic layout, and others are done in novel format. Traditional drawing, inking, coloring, and lettering techniques are used throughout.

=== Titles ===
- 1 - Captured by Pirates
- 2 - Escape from Pyramid X
- 3 - Terror in Ghost Mansion
- 4 - The Treasure of Mount Fate
- 5 - Nightmare on Zombie Island
- 6 - The Time Travel Trap
- 7 - Vampire Hunt
- 8 - Alien Incident on Planet J
- 9 - Agent Mongoose and the Hypno-Beam Scheme
- 10 - The Goblin King
- 11 - Shipwrecked on Mad Island
- 12 - Kung Fu Masters
- 13 - School of Evil
- 14 - Attack of the Mutant Meteors
- 15 - Agent Mongoose and the Attack of the Giant Insects
- 16 - The Quest for Dragon Mountain
- 17 - Detective Frankenstein
- 18 - Horror In Space
- 19 - The Fifth Musketeer
- 20 - Peril in Summerland Park
- 21 - Safari Survivor
- 22 - Hero City

== Foreign imports ==
Graphic Universe also publishes foreign titles in translation, usually from French.

=== Titles ===
- The ElseWhere Chronicles (originally Les Enfants d'ailleurs)
- Waluk
- William and the Lost Spirit
- First Man: Reimagining Matthew Henson
- Terrorist: Gavrilo Princip, the Assassin Who Ignited World War I
- Marco Polo: The Silk Road
- Hotel Strange
- Lou!
- Mortensen's Escapades
- Mr. Badger and Mrs. Fox
- A Game for Swallows
- A Bag of Marbles
- I Remember Beirut
- The Other Side of the Wall
- Tao, the Little Samurai
- The Little Prince
- Tib & Tumtum
- Where's Leopold?
- The Wolf in Underpants

== Selected Honors for Graphic Universe Books ==
=== Will Eisner Comic Industry Awards nominees ===
- A Bag of Marbles by Joseph Joffo, Kris, and Vincent Bailly [Best Reality-Based Work]
- BirdCatDog by Lee Nordling & Meritxell Bosch [Best Publication for Early Readers]
- The Ferret's a Foot by Colleen AF Venable and Stephanie Yue [Best Publication for Kids]

=== Junior Library Guild selections ===
- A Bag of Marbles by Joseph Joffo, Kris, and Vincent Bailly
- Believe Your Eyes by Cori Doerrfeld and Tyler Page
- The Ferret's a Foot by Colleen AF Venable, and Stephanie Yue
- A Game for Swallows: To Die, To Leave, To Return by Zeina Abirached
- Hercules: The Twelve Labors by Paul D. Storrie and Steve Kurth
- I Remember Beirut by Zeina Abirached
- Little White Duck: A Childhood in China by Andrés Vera Martínez, Na Liu, and Andrés Vera Martínez
- The Maltese Mummy by Trina Robbins and Tyler Page
- Terrorist: Gavrilo Princip, the Assassin Who Ignited World War I by Henrik Rehr
- Truth in Sight by Cori Doerrfeld and Tyler Page

=== Kirkus Best Children’s Books ===
- And Then There Were Gnomes by Colleen AF Venable and Stephanie Yue
- BirdCatDog by Lee Nordling & Meritxell Bosch
- Hamster and Cheese by Colleen AF Venable and Stephanie Yue
- Little White Duck: A Childhood in China by Andrés Vera Martínez, Na Liu, and Andrés Vera Martínez
- Wrapped Up in You by Dan Jolley and Natalie Nourigat [Best Teen Books of the Year]

== Artists and Authors ==
Many well-known artists and other members of the comic industry have worked with the various Graphic Universe titles, including Dan Jolley, Thomas Yeates, John McCrea, Trina Robbins, Alitha Martinez, Meritxell Bosch, Na Liu, Zeina Abirached, Bannister, Craig Hamilton, Andrés Vera Martínez, Ron Fontes, Lee Nordling, Steve Kurth, Tyler Page, Cori Doerrfeld, Henrik Rehr, Paul Storrie, Simon Schwartz, Jeff Limke, Stephanie Yue, Colleen AF Venable, and Ron Randall.
