= History of Central Americans in Houston =

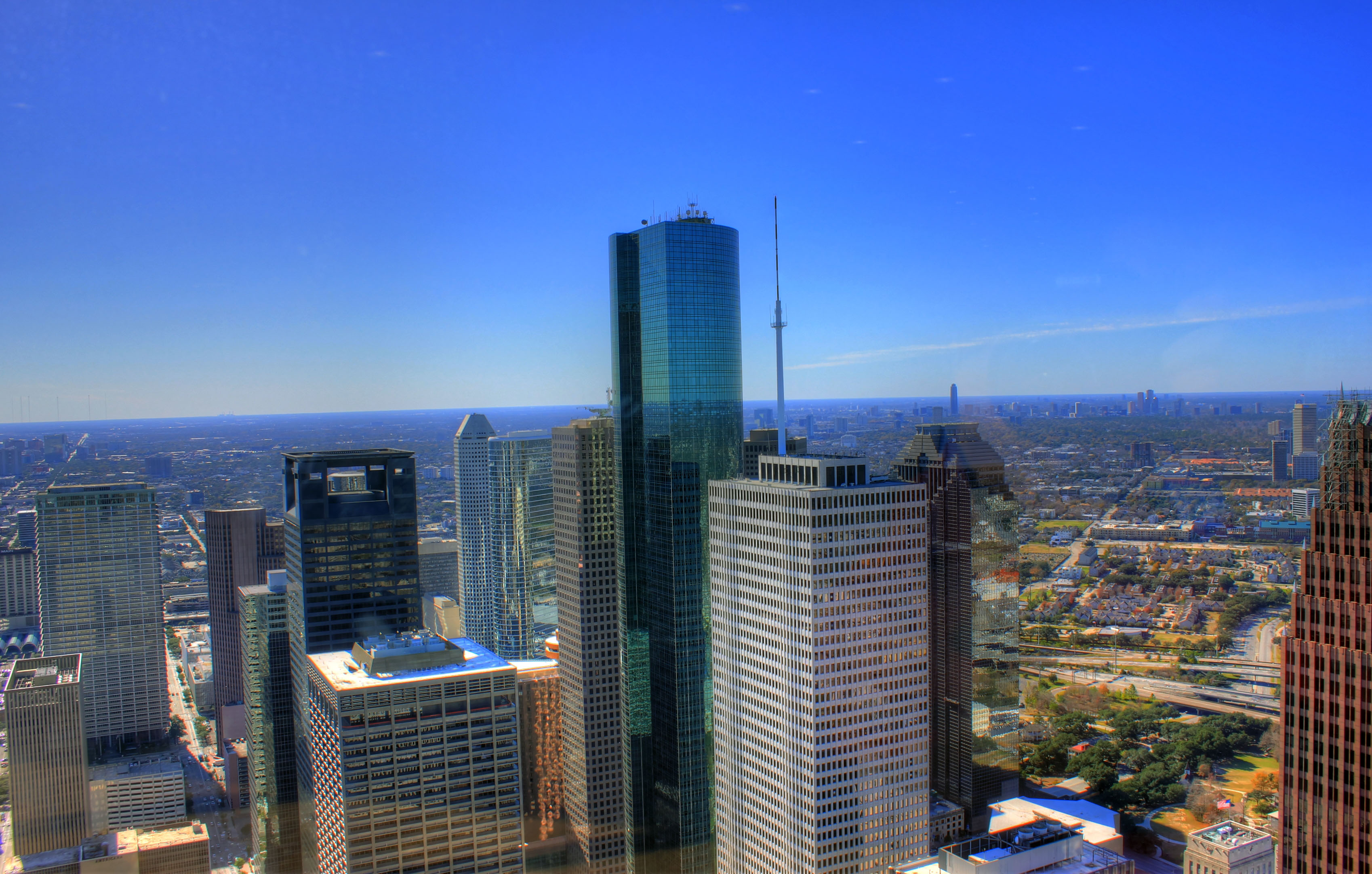
The majority of Central Americans came to Houston as refugees escaping war during the Central American crisis.

U.S Central Americans

Guatemalan Americans

Salvadoran Americans

Honduran Americans

Nicaraguan Americans

Costa Rican Americans

Panamanian Americans

Belizean Americans

The city of Houston includes a significant population of Central American origin due to Texas' proximity to Central America, including origins from El Salvador, Guatemala, Honduras, and other countries.

== History ==
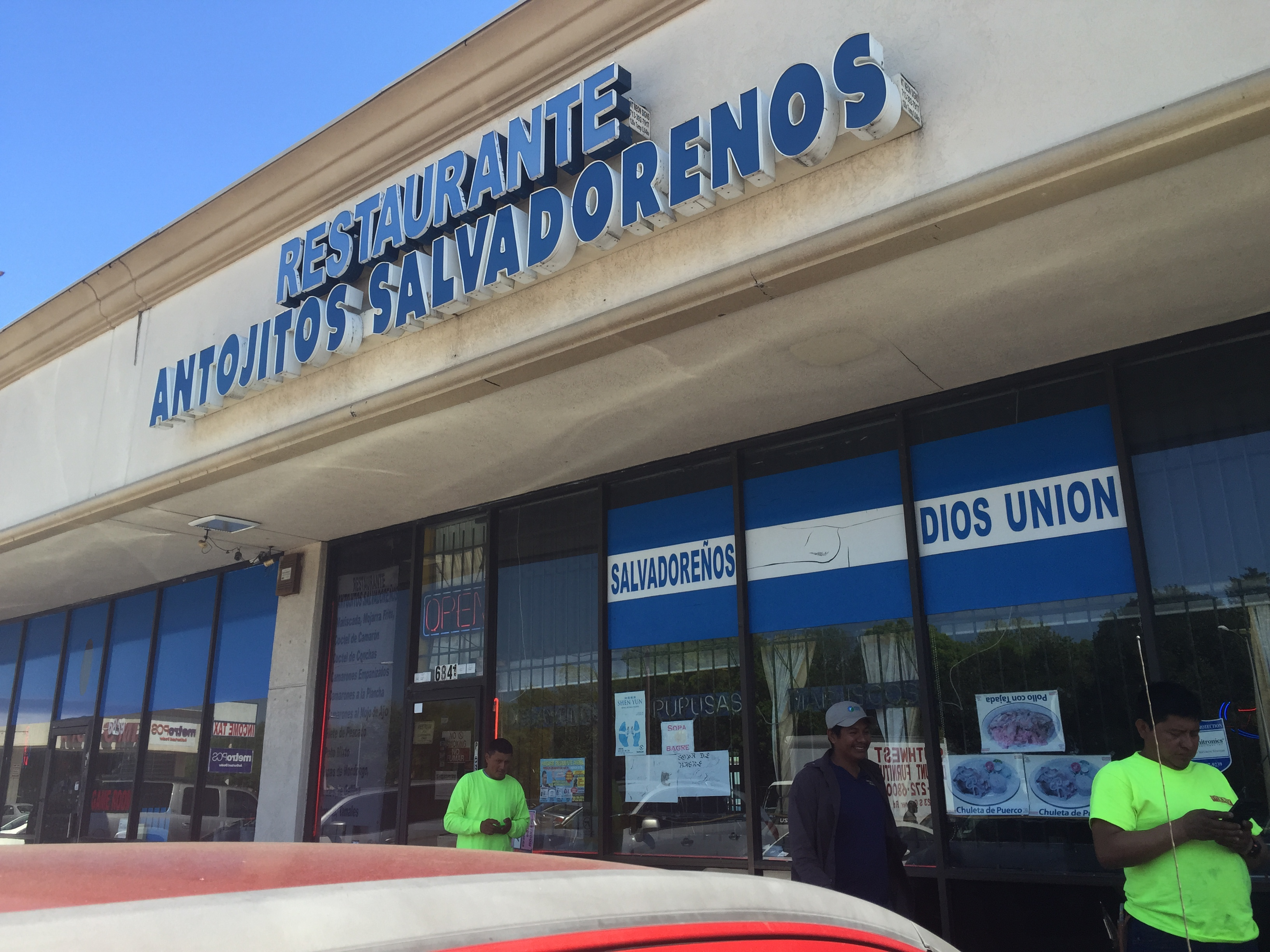
Restaurante Antojitos Salvadoreños - A Salvadoran restaurant in Houston

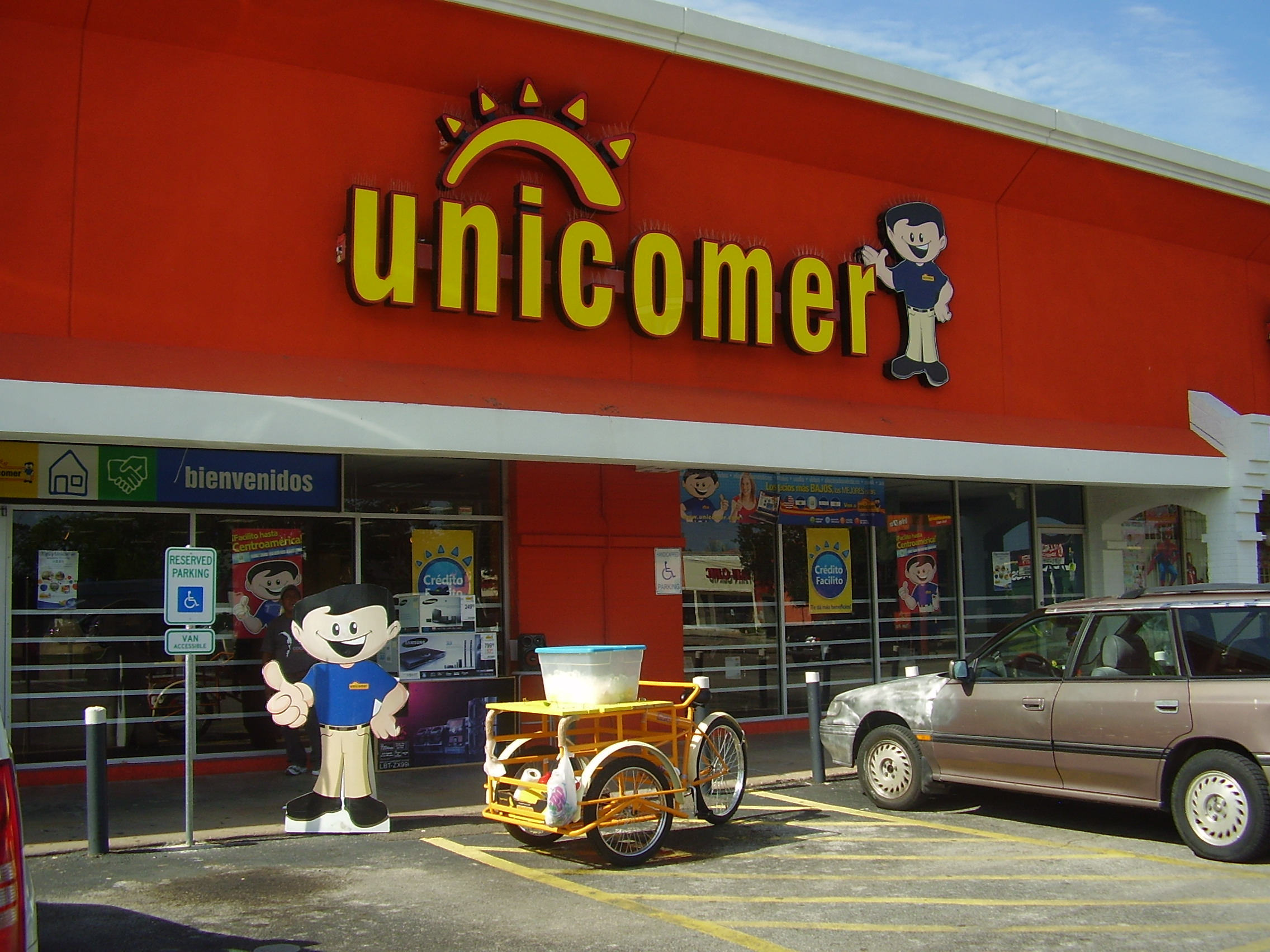
Houston location of Unicomer, in Gulfton

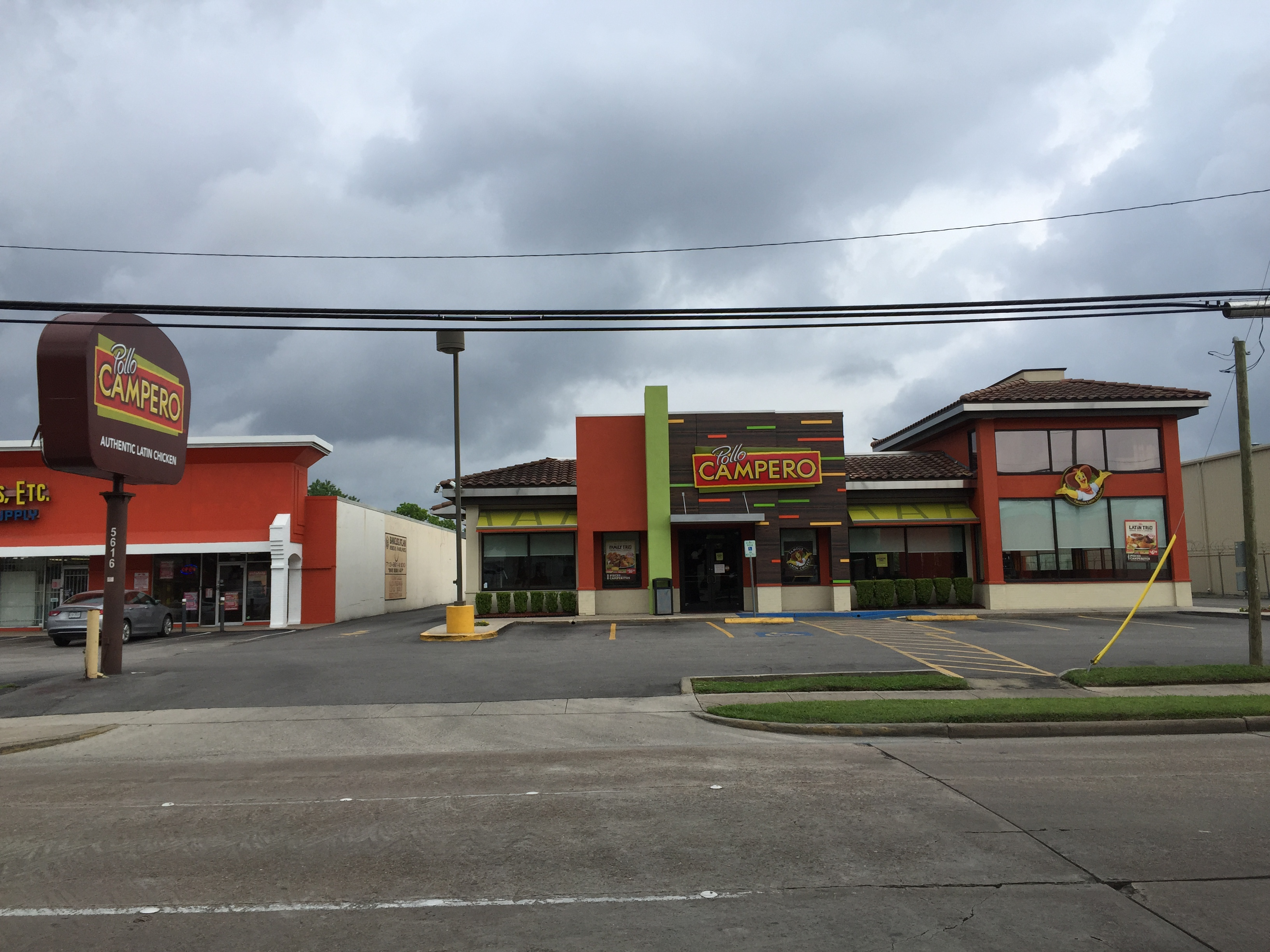
Pollo Campero in Gulfton

Beginning in the late 1970s Central American countries began experiencing economic and political instability. A group of Guatemalan immigrants from the same rural community, came, without visas, to the United States in the 1970s.

In 1980 there were 5,400 Central American immigrants in Greater Houston. In the 1980s, Due to social political problems, a wave of immigration from Central America occurred, with people from El Salvador, Guatemala, Honduras, and Nicaragua arriving. In 1990, there were 47,244 Central Americans in Harris County, with 83% of them being immigrants. The number of Salvadorans among the immigrants was almost 250% that of the combined number of non-Salvadorans.

This immigration wave from Central America led to many Central Americans settling portions of Southwest Houston and west Houston. They settled southwest and west Houston because of a large amount of low income housing that was left vacant by Anglos during the 1980s oil bust. The existing Mexican neighborhoods in such as those in the Second Ward and Magnolia Park largely did not attract Central American immigrants because the neighborhoods did not have enough housing capacity to attract the new immigrants. Rodriguez wrote that a "large segment" of illegal immigrants did settle the longtime Hispanic barrios. This immigration wave from Central America led to Central Americans settling portions of Southwest Houston and west Houston. The immigration wave caused portions of previously almost entirely Anglo portions of Houston to gain new areas of Hispanic settlers. Rodriguez wrote that of the illegal immigrants, "perhaps one-third to one-half," by 1986, lived in "neighborhoods that form zones of Hispanic transition or zones of new Hispanic settlement."

Central Americans who illegally immigrated after 1982 were not eligible for the federal government's amnesty program for illegal immigrants. Some Central Americans became eligible for amnesty and legalization at a later date. Most Central Americans, after arriving, worked in the service sector in informal, low-paying jobs. At the time many immigrated, Houston was experiencing an economic recession.

Central American immigrants received almost no support from the US government. Catholic nuns and priests took efforts to find shelter and food for Central American refugees. Due to the political nature of the immigration, many of the immigrants became involved in political activism upon arriving in the US and they protested US government political interventions in Central America. Around the time of the immigration wave of the 1980s, the Federal Bureau of Investigation (FBI) investigated several Houston residents who had immigrated from Latin America and who had supported leftist groups in their home countries. The FBI investigated left-wing groups opposing the Reagan Administration policies in Latin America, including Committee in Solidarity with the People of El Salvador (CISPES). In addition, the Immigration and Naturalization Service (INS) had arrested illegal immigrants from Central America who had been living in Houston. Nestor Rodriguez, author of "Undocumented Central Americans in Houston: Diverse Populations," wrote that the 1985 surveillance and interrogation of illegal immigrant Salvadorans by agents of the federal government of the United States and the prosecution of sanctuary movement workers by the U.S. government, "demonstrate that the U.S. government perceived these migrants with a special political concern."

In 1990, there were 39,289 immigrants from Central America in Houston. By the 1990s immigration from Central America decreased because the political situations stabilized in Central American countries and Houston's improving economy gave Central Americans economic mobility on par with Mexicans. At that time Southwest Houston developed infrastructure that catered to Central Americans.

By 2021, there were about 250,447 Central Americans in Houston.

== Demographics ==
Guatemala, El Salvador, Honduras, Nicaragua, Costa Rica, Panama and Belize are historically the seven nations in Central America politically, geographically and culturally.

Coat of Arms of Central America

Guatemala

El Salvador

Honduras

Nicaragua

Costa Rica

Panama

Belize

By 1986 the most prominent groups of Central Americans came from El Salvador, Guatemala, and Honduras. Rodriguez identified five key groups: Salvadorans from urban and rural areas, urban Hispanic Guatemalans, rural Guatemalans of Mayan/indigenous origin, urban Hispanic Hondurans, and rural Hondurans of Garifuna origin.

As of 1986 the largest group of Central American immigrants originated from El Salvador. Since 1970 the Houston area had received Salvadoran immigrants, and the number of illegal immigrants from El Salvador in 1986 was, according to Rodriguez, "probably" over 50,000. Rodriguez stated that the number of Guatemalans was "substantially smaller" and was "probably fewer than half of the Salvadoran population, perhaps 10,000 to 15,000" in 1986. Rodriguez stated that according to interviews Guatemalans began arriving around 1982–1983. According to Rodriguez, in 1986 there were about 5,000 to 10,000 Hondurans and that they began arriving in the mid-1980s.

Nestor Rodriguez, author of "Hispanic and Asian Immigration Waves in Houston," wrote that Central American immigrants' "[n]ational identities became the basis for their residential, workplace, and recreational groupings in Central American settlement areas." For instance Guatemalan Mayans settled in distinct areas separated by their regional backgrounds and native languages, separate from other Guatemalan immigrants. Garifuna-speaking Black Caribs (Garifuna Americans) from Belize and Honduras settled in different areas depending on whether they identified more with their black race or their Hispanic ethnicity. If they identified with the race more they settled with African-Americans. If they identified more with the Hispanic ethnicity they settled with Central Americans. In 1990 the median household income of Central Americans was $17,429 and 6% of those aged 25 or older had a bachelor's degree.

Nestor Rodriguez differentiated between Guatemalans of Hispanic origins and Guatemalans of Mayan origin: the latter only stated "Hispanic" on official forms for employment, medical, and other purposes as they perceive the term "Hispanic" as a residual category. Rodriguez stated that in Houston the indigenous Mayans preferred to not be addressed as indios ("Indians") believing it was an "incorrect, improper, and denigrating term" so he referred to them as indigenas ("indigenous"). This was despite the prevalence of English-language literature referring to them as "Indians".

The ethnic composition of Central Americans is quite diverse, Salvadorans and Costa Ricans tend to identify themselves more as White, Guatemalans tend more to identify themselves as Native Americans, two or more races or some other race (Mestizo, Ladino and Mulato), Hondurans, Panamanians and Nicaraguans tend to identify more as Black Latin Americans, two or more races and some other race.

== Language ==
By the 1980s, due to the influx of Central Americans, new languages such as Guatemalan Mayan languages and Garifuna, a language spoken in Honduras, began having a presence in Houston. As of 1986, the Salvadorans, urban Hispanic Guatemalans, and urban Hispanic Hondurans spoke Spanish. The indigena Guatemalans were bilingual in Spanish and languages such as Kaqchikel (Cakchikel), Kiche' (Quiche), and Mam. The Garifunas from Honduras were bilingual in Spanish and Garifuna.

Jessi Elana Aaron and José Esteban Hernández, authors of "Quantitative evidence for contact-induced accommodation: Shifts in /s/ reduction patterns in Salvadoran Spanish in Houston," wrote that "Contact and interaction between Salvadorans and Mexicans in Houston is intense" despite the fact that "the awareness of distinct phonological and morphosyntactic features in Houston seems to translate into negative attitudes" against Salvadoran speech and Salvadoran people and that in many of the interviews the authors conducted the negative attitudes towards the Salvadoran speech were "clearly reflected". Aaron and Hernández stated that in Houston, with contact between Mexican Spanish and Salvadoran Spanish there is a "one-sided" "pressure" on the Salvadoran speech but not on the Mexican Spanish.

== Culture ==
Due to the influx of Central American immigrants, by the 1980s foods such as pupusas from El Salvador and Guatemalan tamales de maiz began having a presence in Houston.

In 2002, the first Pollo Campero opened in Houston, in the Gulfton neighborhood. On the opening day, news channels reported on Latin Americans, including Guatemalans and Salvadorans, waiting up to five hours in line to get their food from Pollo Campero.

== Institutions ==
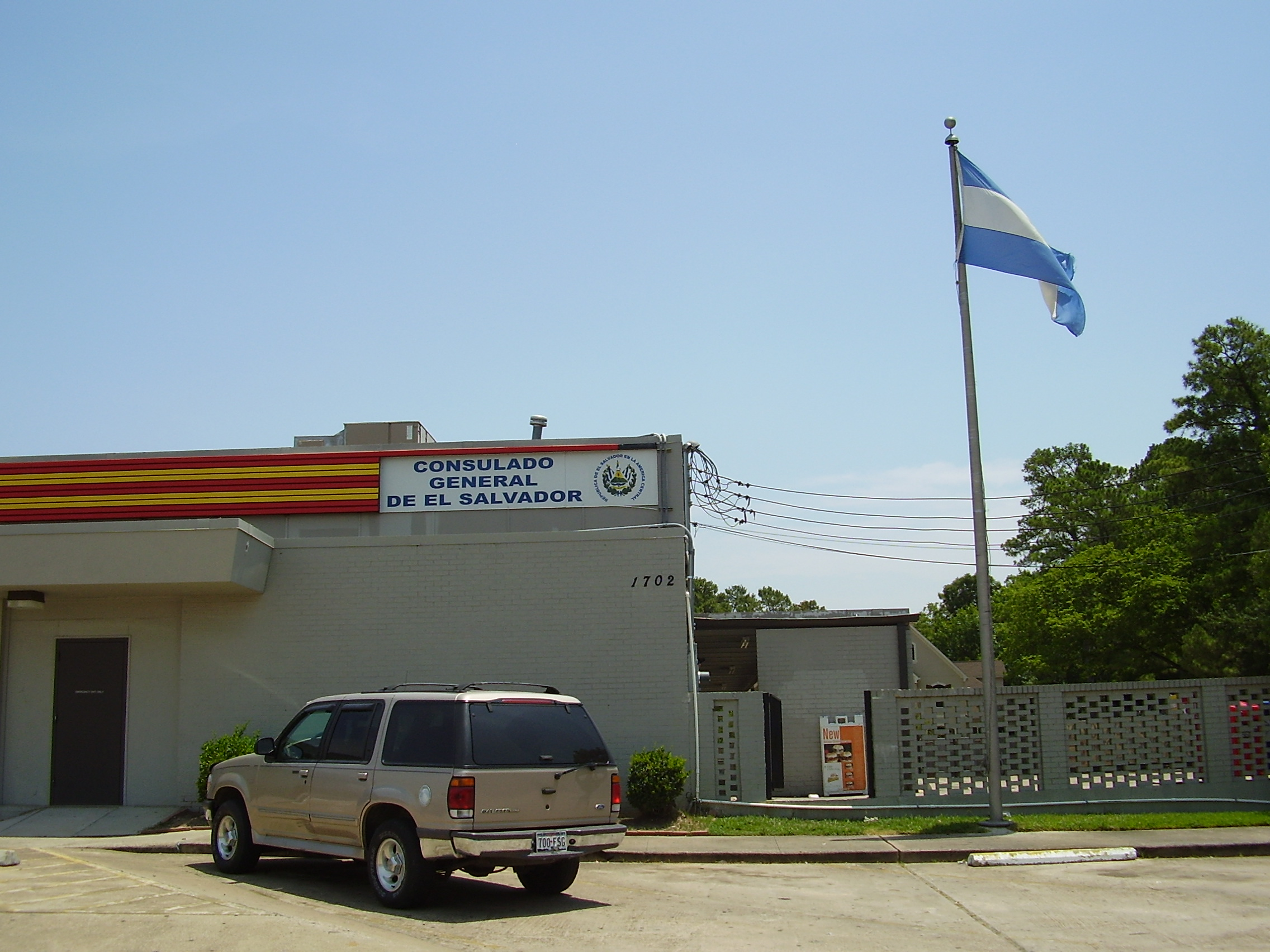
Consulate-General of El Salvador in Houston

The Consulate-General of El Salvador in Houston resides in the Spring Branch area of Houston. Other Central American consulates include those of Costa Rica, Guatemala, Honduras, Nicaragua, and Panama.

As of 2005 many Central American businesses have outlets in Gulfton. As of that year, ADOC footwear has its only United States store located in Gulfton. As of that year Salvadoran banks have three branches and an importing business in the area.

In 1985, recent Salvadoran immigrants opened the Central American Refugee Center (CARECEN) to provide legal services for Central American immigrants. Between 1988 and 1992 CARECEN cooperated with the Central American Refugee Committee (CARC) to publicize and advocate issues related to the Salvadoran Civil War and the immigration of Salvadorans to the United States. In 1992 the Salvadoran Civil War ended but CARECEN continued to provide legal services, publications, and advocacy for Central American immigrants. They also began campaigning the federal government to provide permanent legal residency to the Salvadoran refugees.

== In media ==
The 2012 novel The Knife and the Butterfly by Ashley Hope Pérez, based on the 2006 death of Gabriel Granillo, has a Salvadoran American main character. Pérez researched MS-13 and Houston's Salvadoran community. One aspect in the novel is the differing use of Spanish. The younger Salvadoran Americans have influence from other Spanish dialects while the older ones have signature elements of Salvadoran Spanish such as the use of vos.

== Notable Central Americans from Houston ==
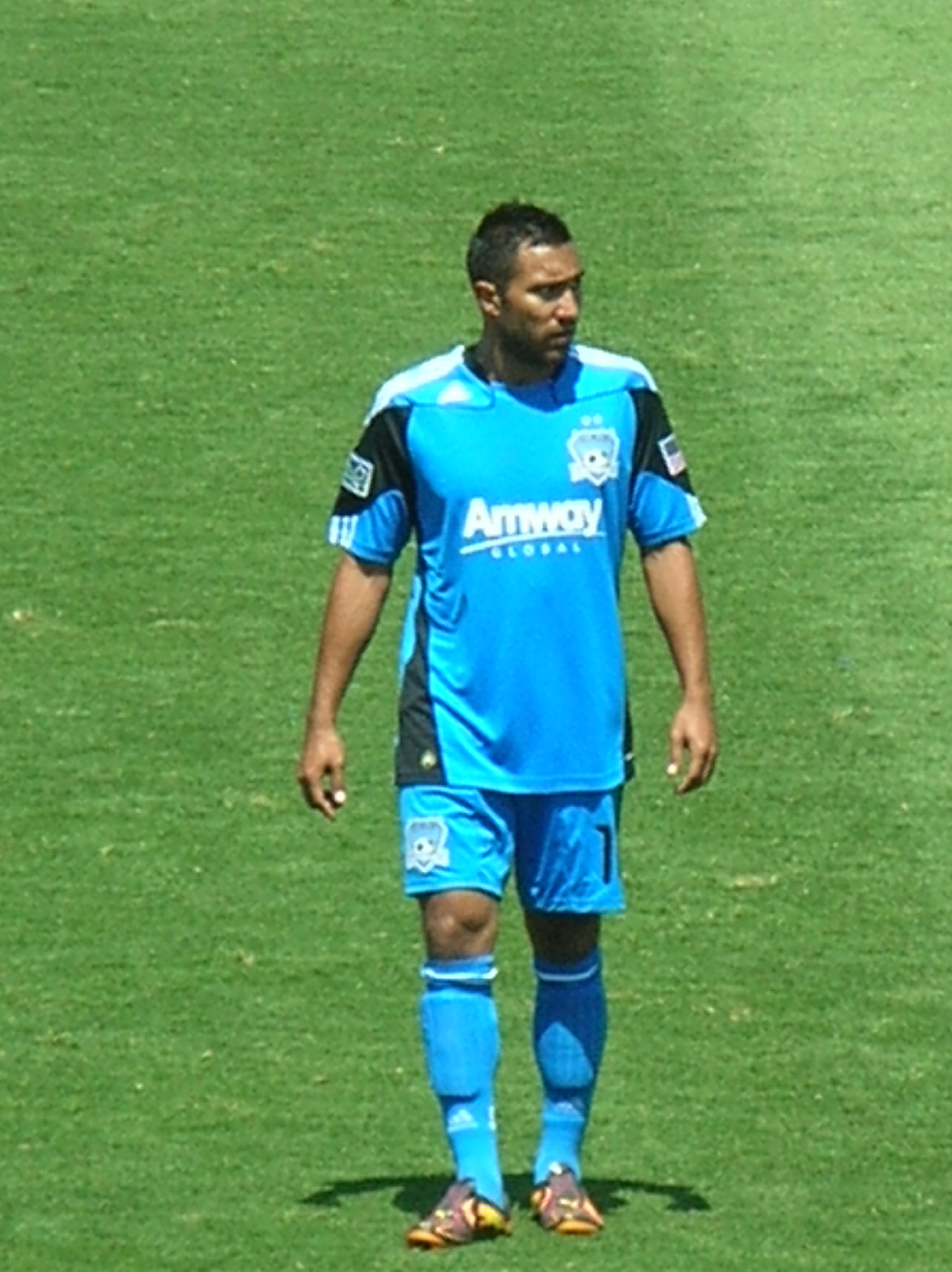
Arturo Álvarez (footballer, born 1985)

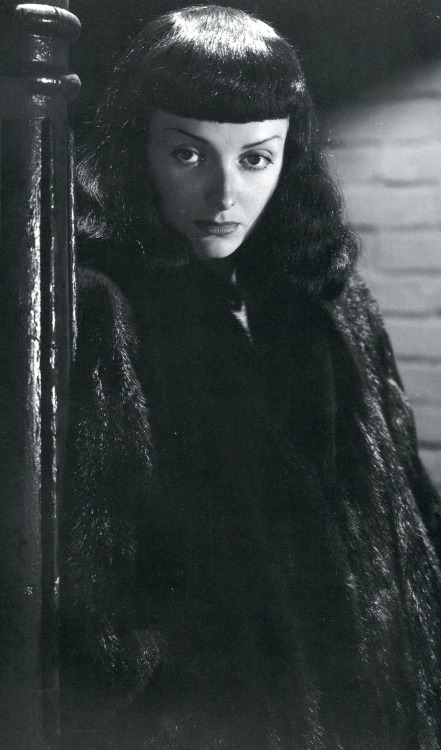
Jean Brooks (actor/singer)

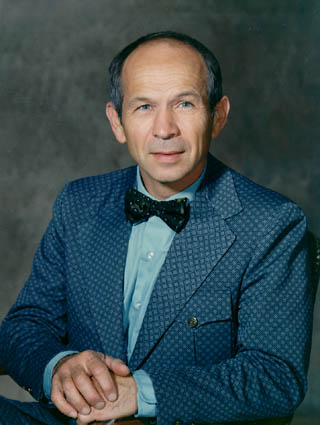
Maxime Faget (mechanical engineer)

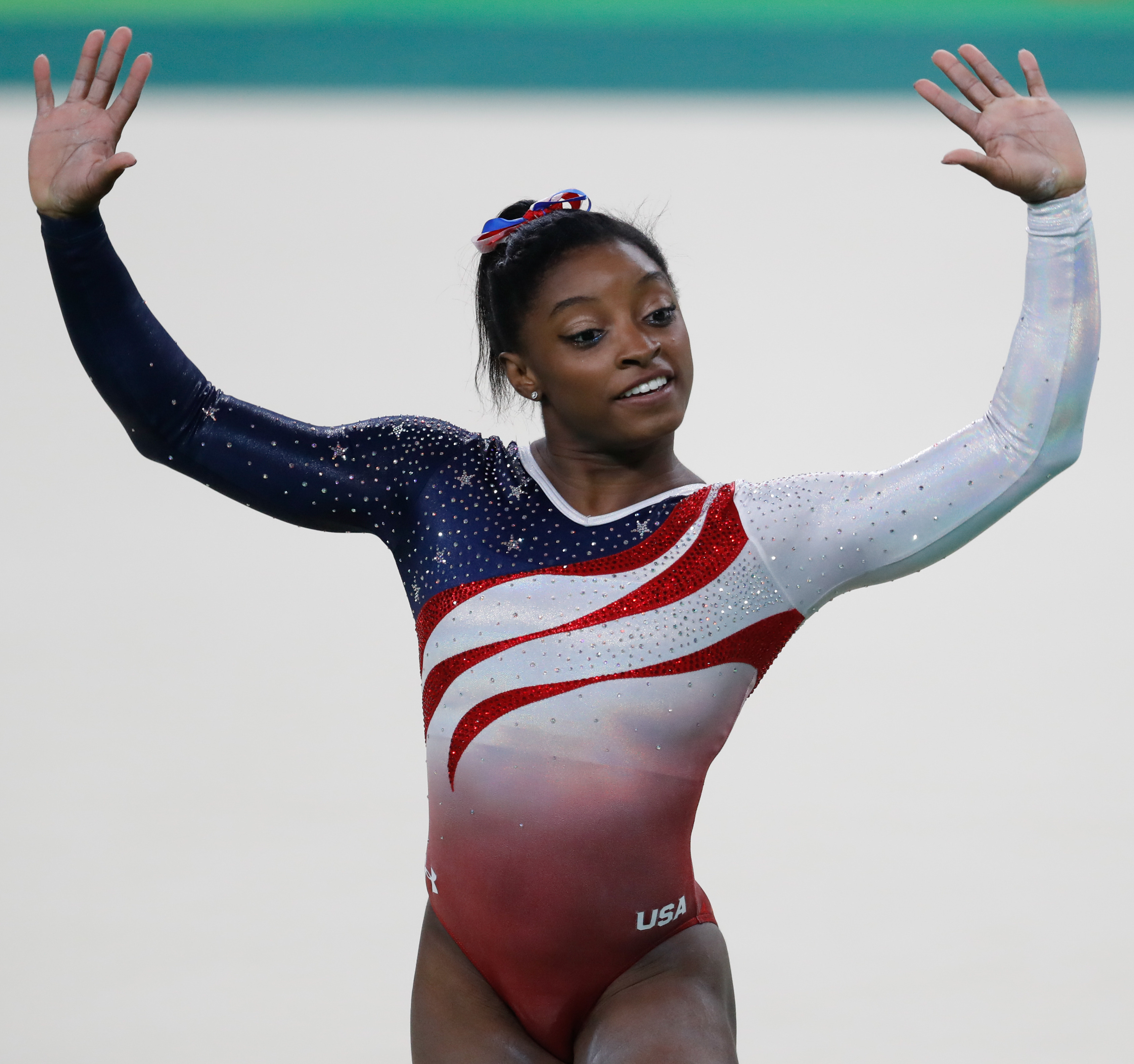
Simone Biles (artistic gymnast)

== See also ==
- Demographics of Houston
- History of the Mexican-Americans in Houston
- Gulfton, Houston
