= The Old Geezers =

Comic series

The Old Geezers (French: Les Vieux Fourneaux) is a comic book series written by Wilfrid Lupano with illustrations by Paul Cauuet. It was published in France beginning in 2014 by Dargaud. The English version was published by Ablaze beginning in 2020; Montana Kane is the translator.

It is about three elderly men who are best friends: Antoine, Emile, and Pierre; all of them have leftist political views.

Publishers Weekly wrote that Volume 1 "lampoons the more outrageous aspects of leftist groups".

Two films were based on the series, Tricky Old Dogs (in French, Les Vieux Fourneaux) and Tricky Old Dogs 2.

The Wolf in Underpants was made as a spin-off of The Old Geezers.

== Reception ==
Publishers Weekly stated that in Volume 1 the "detailed cartooning is superbly expressive."
