= Little White Duck: A Childhood in China =

2012 non-fiction graphic novel by Na Liu

- First edition cover
- Author: Na Liu
- Illustrator: Andrés Vera Martínez
- Language: English
- Genre: Memoir, Graphic novel
- Publisher: Graphic Universe
- Publication date: October 1, 2012
- Pages: 108
- ISBN: 9780761365877

Little White Duck: A Childhood in China is a 2012 non-fiction graphic novel written by Na Liu and illustrated by her husband, Andrés Vera Martínez. It discusses Na Liu's childhood in China during the 1970s and 1980s.

Na Liu, who grew up in Wuhan, is an oncologist and hematologist. Her husband is from Texas.

Ryan Holmberg stated in an article for Yishu: Journal of Contemporary Chinese Art that Little White Duck is "primarily a book designed to sensitize American children today to the poverty a distant, now-wealthy country experienced only a generation ago." Holmberg stated that therefore the Communist ideology present in China at the time is not the primary theme of the book.

== Story and contents ==
The book's story is in eight parts. The book includes Na Liu's reaction to the death of Mao Zedong. Elizabeth Bird, an Evanston Public Library Collection Development Manager and a previous New York Public Library materials specialist, stated how Na Liu cries since the other persons around her are also crying is "very realistic."

The book includes supplementary materials, such as maps, translations of hanzi, a glossary, and a timeline of Chinese history.

== Reception ==
Bird gave a favorable review to the book in an article for the School Library Journal. Bird cited how it "simply tells a true story about some of the people who were helped by Mao's rule" and has "universal stories from her youth that anybody can enjoy," even though it was one of several works around the Cultural Revolution, a common theme in children's books about China available in the United States, and used that particular setting. Bird stated that a coworker who grew up in China in the same period confirmed to her that the book's details were authentic.

Publishers Weekly stated described Na Liu as a "storyteller whose words are enlivened by Martinez's enthusiastic and energetic art, and their respective tones complement each other fluidly."

Kirkus Reviews stated that the book is "beautifully drawn and quietly evocative."

Little White Duck was a 2012 Cybils Award finalist in the Elementary and Middle Grade Graphic Novel category.
