= Murder of David Lynn Harris =

Mariticide in Nassau Bay, Texas, US

David Lynn Harris was an American orthodontist who owned a chain of offices along with his wife, Clara Suarez Harris. The chain was particularly successful, and the couple was able to afford an upscale home and lifestyle in Friendswood, Texas. On July 24, 2002, Clara Harris confronted her husband in a hotel parking lot over an extramarital affair, then struck and ran over him with her Mercedes-Benz sedan, killing him in an act of mariticide. She was convicted of sudden passion and sentenced to 20 years in prison.

== Marriage ==
Clara Suarez, a Colombian immigrant, was named "Mrs. Colombia Houston" and worked as a dentist. She married David Harris on February 14, 1992, at the Nassau Bay Hilton, and raised three children: twin sons Brian and Bradley, born in 1998, and David's daughter Lindsey from a previous marriage. During his marriage to Clara, David began to have an affair with his former receptionist, Gail Bridges. Suspicious, Clara hired a private detective agency to monitor David, and on July 24, 2002, the agency notified her that he was at a hotel with his mistress.

== Murder and trial ==
Clara's trial began the following February. Lindsey testified against her stepmother, claiming she told her to stop the vehicle.

Clara was found guilty of murdering her husband. On February 14, 2003, she was sentenced to twenty years in prison – the maximum sentence allowed by the jury's "sudden passion" finding – and fined $10,000. She was incarcerated at the Mountain View Unit in Gatesville, Texas, where she converted school textbooks to Braille for blind students. Clara's sons, who are in the custody of family friends, were said to visit about once a month. She was denied parole in her first attempt on April 11, 2013, by the Texas Board of Pardons and Paroles. Her second parole request was denied in September 2016. However, she was granted parole in November 2017.

== Aftermath ==
David's parents sued Clara Harris, and the judgment was that she owed them $3.75 million.

While in prison, Clara Harris worked to translate books into braille. Skip Hollandsworth of Texas Monthly stated that Harris was a "model prisoner". Harris was released on parole on May 11, 2018, and was released from parole in February 2023.

Due to her felon status, she is not permitted to work as a dentist. Hollandsworth described her, when she first left prison, as "penniless". She initially resided with a friend due to her financial status. Kevin Stouwie, Clara Harris's parole attorney, stated that the company managing the braille translation operations in Texas state prisons wanted Clara Harris to continue her work.

== In popular culture ==
Houstonians referred to Harris' crime as a figure of speech after the criminal trial had occurred. Hollandsworth referred to the phrase "pulling a Clara Harris", referring to a woman doing revenge against her husband.

A book titled Out of Control was written by Steven Long about the case. Published in 2004 by St. Martin's Paperbacks, the book follows the story of the murder and the reasons behind it. This story was the inspiration for the completion of a chapter in the Mexican series Mujeres Asesinas "Killer Women." The chapter title is Luz, overwhelming (Luz, arrolladora).

The case was profiled on the Oxygen Network series Snapped in 2004, on ABC News's 20/20 in 2006, and on Investigation Discovery's Deadly Women in 2010. It was also the topic of Suburban Madness, a CBS Original movie, starring Elizabeth Peña and Brett Cullen.

== See also ==
- Crime in Houston
