= Candelaria de la Frontera =

- Municipality
- Location in El Salvador
- Coordinates: 14°7′N 89°39′W
- Country: El Salvador
- Department: Santa Ana Department

Government
  - Mayor: Janet Rivera (ARENA)

Area
  - Total: 35.19 sq mi (91.13 km^{2})
- Elevation: 2,224 ft (678 m)

Population (2007)
  - Total: 22,686

Candelaria de la Frontera is a municipality in the Santa Ana department of El Salvador.

== Climate ==
Climate data for Candelaria de la Frontera (1991–2020)
Month	Jan	Feb	Mar	Apr	May	Jun	Jul	Aug	Sep	Oct	Nov	Dec	Year
Mean daily maximum °C (°F)	30.2 (86.4)	31.6 (88.9)	32.9 (91.2)	33.7 (92.7)	32.3 (90.1)	30.8 (87.4)	30.9 (87.6)	31.1 (88.0)	30.4 (86.7)	29.8 (85.6)	29.6 (85.3)	29.9 (85.8)	31.1 (88.0)
Daily mean °C (°F)	23.0 (73.4)	23.9 (75.0)	25.1 (77.2)	26.1 (79.0)	25.6 (78.1)	24.6 (76.3)	24.8 (76.6)	24.7 (76.5)	24.0 (75.2)	23.9 (75.0)	23.4 (74.1)	23.0 (73.4)	24.4 (75.9)
Mean daily minimum °C (°F)	18.3 (64.9)	18.5 (65.3)	19.0 (66.2)	20.1 (68.2)	20.6 (69.1)	20.4 (68.7)	20.5 (68.9)	20.4 (68.7)	20.0 (68.0)	20.1 (68.2)	19.6 (67.3)	18.8 (65.8)	19.7 (67.5)
Average precipitation mm (inches)	1.5 (0.06)	3.6 (0.14)	5.5 (0.22)	48.6 (1.91)	191.9 (7.56)	286.1 (11.26)	233.4 (9.19)	296.8 (11.69)	326.5 (12.85)	189.7 (7.47)	33.4 (1.31)	7.9 (0.31)	1,624.8 (63.97)
Average relative humidity (%)	62	60	59	62	70	78	73	76	80	77	68	65	69.2
Source: Ministerio de Medio Ambiente y Recursos Naturales

== People ==
Gabriel Granillo, a Salvadoran American killed during a 2006 gang fight in Houston, Texas, is buried in Candelaria de la Frontera.
