= Killing of Gabriel Granillo =

2006 murder in Houston, Texas

Gabriel Granillo
- Born: Gabriel Granillo; August 1, 1990; United States
- Died: June 6, 2006 (aged 15); Houston, Texas, United States
- Resting place: Candelaria de la Frontera, El Salvador
- Known for: Being killed in a gang fight

On June 6, 2006, a teenage boy named Gabriel Granillo also known as Pelón was stabbed to death at Ervan Chew Park, in the Neartown district in Houston, Texas. His killer, Ashley Paige Benton, underwent a criminal murder trial which resulted in a hung jury. Benton's lawyers and the assistant Harris County district attorney agreed to give Benton probation in exchange for Benton pleading guilty to aggravated assault. Her probation was ended early in 2009, and her criminal charge was to be dismissed as part of terms of successfully completing her probation.

In 2008 Skip Hollandsworth of Texas Monthly referred to Benton as "Houston's most famous teenage killer" and stated that the fact that the stabbing took place in the central city, and the fact that Ashley Benton was a white, Anglo teenage girl involved in gangs shocked Houstonians. The Houston Press wrote that the resulting murder trial "fascinated Houston". In 2014 Andy Warren of the Houston Chronicle listed the Granillo stabbing among the "infamous crimes in the Houston area". A 2011 novel, The Knife and the Butterfly, is based upon the incident.

== Background ==
Ashley Paige Benton
- Occupation: Student at Lamar High School (previously Cypress Creek High School)
- Status: Probation completed Aggravated assault charge dismissed as a result
- Motive: Defense team: self-defense Prosecution: Deliberate
- Conviction: Aggravated assault (later dismissed)
- Criminal charges: Murder (pleaded down to aggravated assault after a mistrial)
- Penalty: Deferred adjudication probation

Details
- Victims: Gabriel Granillo
- Date: June 6, 2006
- Location: Neartown, Houston
- Weapon: Knife

Ashley Benton is of English descent, was a student at Lamar High School and socialized with members of the gang "Crazy Crew." According to police reports, it mainly engaged in low level crime. Hollandsworth described it as, compared with other Houston gangs, not "much of a gang". Benton, previously a student at Lanier Middle School and Hogg Middle School, moved to live with her grandmother in a suburban area in northwest Houston, and attended Cypress Creek High School. However she returned to her mother's Montrose residence and enrolled in Lamar in April 2006. Prior to the incident Benton had no arrest record. Marilyn D. McShane and Ming-Li Hsieh, authors of Women and Criminal Justice, noted that Benton had "a history of disruptive behavior" including various conflicts with school rules such as fighting and possession of weapons, and family issues. She was 16 years old at the time of Granillo's death.

Gabriel Granillo, also known as "Pelón" (Hairless in Spanish), was of Salvadorian origins, 15 at the time of his death, was the child of Salvadoran immigrants. His mother had died, and his father, an illegal immigrant, was arrested in the summer of 2005 over a felony conviction and deported. With his parents gone, Granillo stayed with his older brother and a friend. Granillo became a member of MS-13 at age 14, and he was previously incarcerated in the Harris County Youth Village, a juvenile detention facility in Pasadena, Texas, near the city of Seabrook.

== The stabbing and immediate aftermath ==
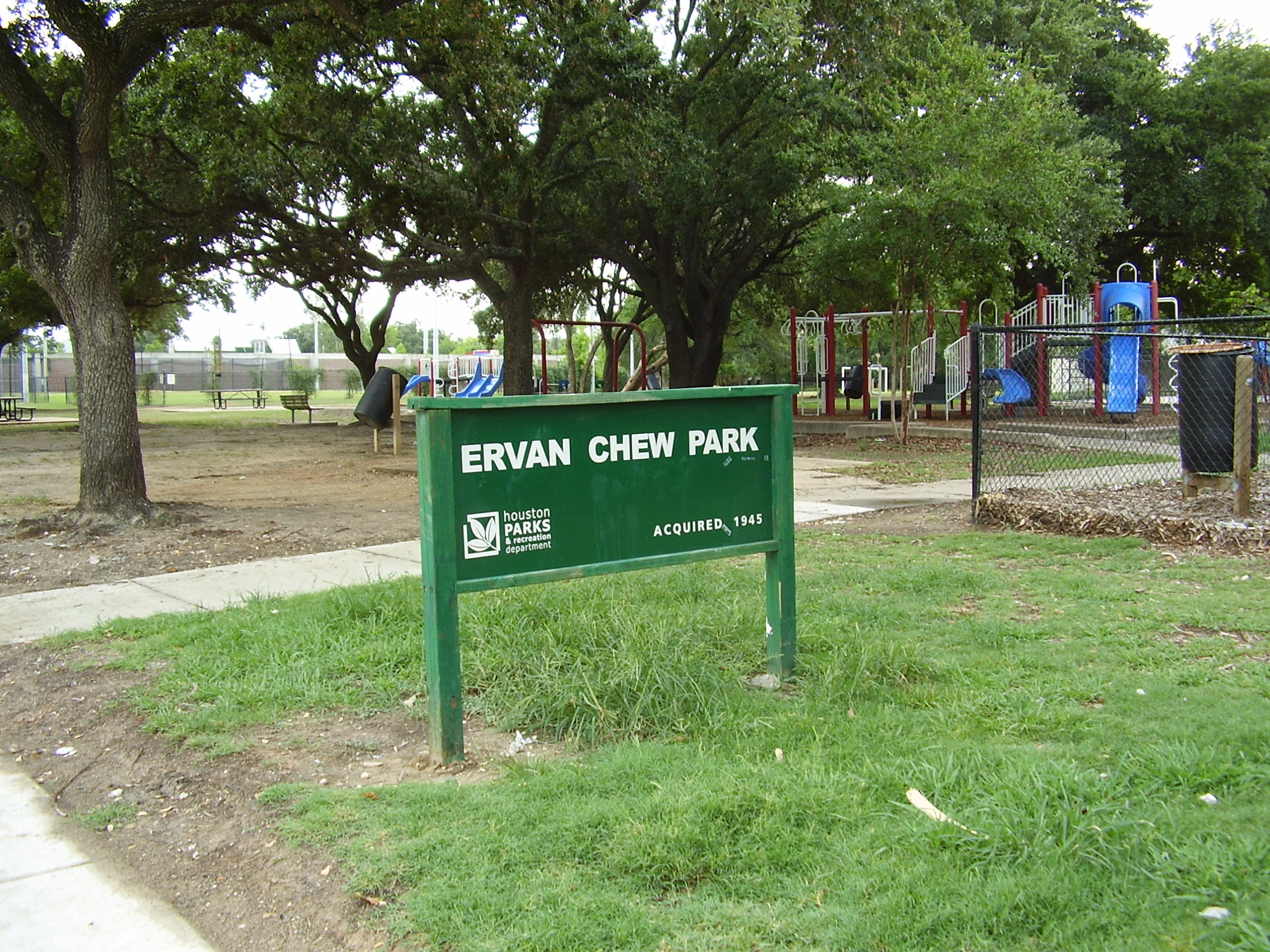
Ervan Chew Park, the site of Granillo's death

According to Hollandsworth, the reason behind the fight between MS-13 and Crazy Crew was that a Crazy Crew member had allegedly harassed the cousin of an MS-13 member.

The Montrose area and Lamar High School were considered to be Crazy Crew's territory. MS-13 appeared at Lamar High School in order to intimidate Crazy Crew, but Houston Independent School District (HISD) police asked MS-13 members to leave. Eyder Peralta and Claudia Feldman of the Houston Chronicle wrote that if HISD police had called the Houston Police Department (HPD), "it's possible the stabbing could have been prevented." The members of the two gangs met at a CVS pharmacy and chased each other around before they stopped at Ervan Chew Park, located in the Neartown district, in proximity to Montrose. The park, previously known as Dunlavy Park, was by 2006 cleaned of drugs and crime due to rehabilitation efforts; it became popular with area families as the surrounding neighborhood gentrified. That year the Houston Chronicle stated that Chew Park was "better known for Little League games and dog parties".

Members of the two gangs fought one another, with numbers totaling around 20–30; the number of Crazy Crew to MS-13 was about 2 to 1. Benton later stated that she felt threatened by a person who was coming towards her, while MS-13 gang members said that Granillo was turning away from her. Benton stabbed Granillo with a double-bladed knife, killing him. The 5.5-inch (140 mm) blade punctured Granillo's heart, traveling at an upward angle below the sternum. Granillo was declared dead at the park.

Avelardo Valdez, a University of Houston professor of social work, stated "It's very unusual for a woman to be involved in this kind of violent gang confrontation." McShane and Hsieh noted that this case, along with that of Elisabeth Mandala, was an example of a teenage girl who ended up in "statistical groups" atypical for that sex and age group and more typical for juvenile males, due to "perhaps bad choices" and "unpredictable behavior" despite Benton having normalcy "in so many ways".

At Chew Park HPD officers took the people with Granillo to question them. Police obtained a confession from Benton at her residence. One of Benton's lawyers stated that the confession was illegal since Benton was questioned without her mother. No lawyers were present during the confession. The girl was arrested at that residence.

John Cannon, a spokesperson for HPD, described the Ervan Chew area as "relatively low-crime" and that his patrols "were surprised" by the incident. Sue Lovell, a member of the Houston City Council who represented the area, and someone who knew Benton, described it as "an isolated incident". Rich Wilson, an HPD sergeant operating from the Neartown Storefront, told residents that the stabbing was an "isolated gang activity" and that the park is safe and surveilled. The Neartown Association president, Allen Ueckert, stated that the community was "on heightened alert". Immediately after the stabbing the usage of the park declined.

The following Saturday HPD arrested an MS-13 member attempting to create a memorial at the site of Granillo's death, citing graffiti as the reason.

== Criminal trial ==
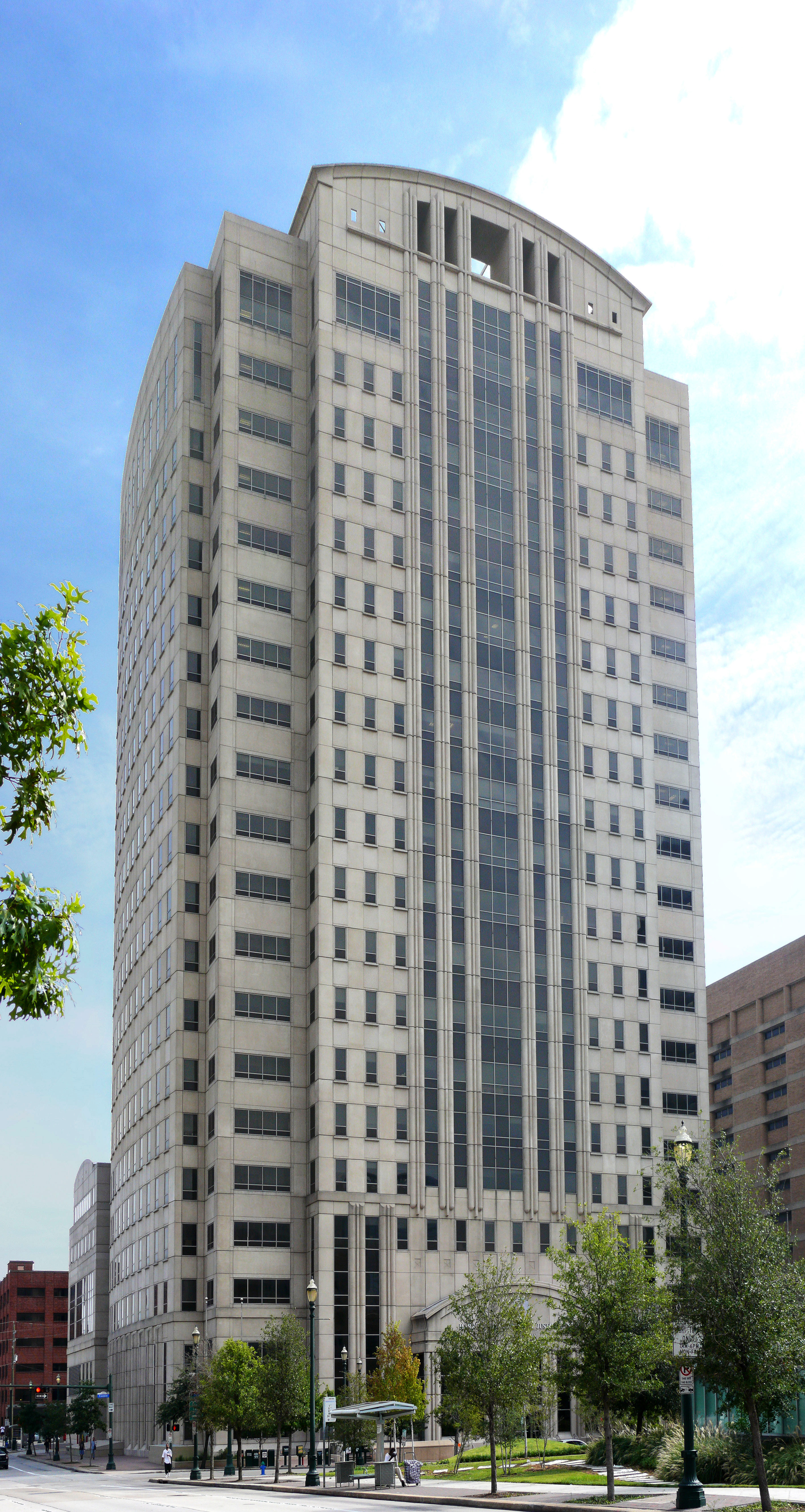
Harris County Criminal Courts Building in Downtown Houston

Benton underwent a murder trial in which she was tried as an adult, and she had the possibility of receiving probation or 5 years to life in prison. She was originally to be tried as a juvenile, and under that scenario she could have been sentenced to up to 40 years in prison, but Texas state district judge Pat Shelton transferred Benton to adult court, after the prosecutors petitioned to have Benton tried as an adult. She was transferred from the Harris County Juvenile Detention Center to an adult jail, but was allowed to post bail and stay under house arrest one week later.

Benton's lawyers in her 2007 trial were Rick DeToto, Kent Schaffer, and Brian Wice, described by Hollandsworth as "prominent". Wice was the first attorney in contact with Benton, and DeToto and Wice recruited Schaffer due to his experience in criminal defense cases; he was known for defending prominent individuals in several criminal trials. The defense would have cost $150,000 (equivalent to $233,000 today), but DeToto, Schaffer, and Wice agreed to represent Benton pro bono due to the low income status of her mother. The district attorney (DA) of Harris County, Texas at the time was Chuck Rosenthal. Mia Magness, the assistant district attorney, served as the main prosecutor. Magness and Wice regarded one another as quality lawyers. Police officers conducted searches of bags and used wands to check for metal, as well as posting armed police around the courtroom, due to concerns that MS-13 may try to attack Benton.

Brian Rogers of the Houston Chronicle stated that the "basic facts" surrounding Granillo's death "were undisputed". The dispute was regarding the nature of the death. Mia Magness accused Benton of deliberately trying to attack Granillo, while Benton's attorneys stated that Granillo was not running away from her and that the MS-13 members saying that she attacked Granillo were lying. One MS-13 member, after questioning from Schaffer, admitted that he did not see Granillo running away. The prosecutor stated that the taped confession had her admit that Granillo was trying to leave, while her lawyers stated that Benton gave conflicting information in the confession.

This trial resulted in a hung jury. About half of the jury members sided with Benton and the other half were against her after two days of deliberating the case. One of Benton's lawyers stated that five jurors believed Benton was guilty of murder while seven instead wanted to convict her of possession of a prohibited weapon. Magness disputed the lawyer's account but did not say what the outcome was. Devon Anderson, a state district judge, declared a mistrial, ending the proceedings.

The trial ended on June 29, 2007.

== Plea deal ==
The prosecutors offered a plea deal calling for a murder conviction with no prison time and 10 years of deferred adjudication. If Benton successfully completed this term, the conviction would be voided, but if she failed, she would be convicted of murder and therefore face 5–99 years of prison or life in prison. Benton's lawyers rejected the deal. Devon Anderson ordered a retrial with jury selection scheduled for June 4, 2008.

The judge entered a gag order preventing Schaffer and Wice from making statements favorable to Benton. The two lawyers asked the Fourteenth Court of Appeals of Texas to remove the gag order and all of the members agreed to remove it. Afterward the prosecutors offered a plea deal more generous than the previous one available. Craig Malislow of the Houston Press wrote that the decision from the appeals court had "an in-depth exploration of state and federal case law regarding gag orders and freedom of speech."

Benton's lawyers and Magness agreed to give Benton probation, in exchange for Benton pleading guilty to aggravated assault with a deadly weapon, in December of that year. As part of the deal she was to receive five years of deferred adjudication probation, perform 300 hours of community service, and obtain a high school diploma and/or GED certificate. A violation of the terms of probation would mean being convicted of aggravated assault and facing up to 20 years in prison. Benton completed 300 hours of community service, stayed under probation for two years, and paid for Granillo's funeral with $4,000. Kevin Fine, a Texas state district judge, ended Benton's probation early in 2009. As part of the terms of successful completion of the probation, her criminal charge was to be dismissed.

Tulio Martinez, Granillo's uncle, stated that the deceased's family was unhappy with the plea deal.

== Media coverage ==
In 2006 Claudia Feldman and Eyder Peralta of the Houston Chronicle wrote the article series "The Butterfly and the Knife," documenting the death of Granillo and the lives of Benton and Granillo.

James T. Campbell, an employee of the Chronicle, wrote that some readers accused the newspaper of publishing a racist series or trying to garner sympathy for Benton, and that "Most readers who contacted me were indifferent or baffled about why we chose to prominently feature "two losers on the front page of the Chronicle."" One individual accused the Chronicle of airing the series because Benton was white. Campbell defended the series, saying that the series "had value, I think, as a cautionary tale for the community, parents and law enforcement about a group of kids that we have lost or are losing to society's underbelly."

== Legacy ==
Granillo was given funeral rites and buried in Candelaria de la Frontera, El Salvador.

After Benton accepted the plea deal in 2007, Schaffer stated that the girl had continued to receive death threats from MS-13, so she needed to have a "fresh start" and move to a new place. Benton began studying for her GED and moved back into her grandparents' residence. For safety reasons she did not travel often and she did not visit her former neighborhood. She changed her family name, moved to another state, and started a family. In a 2015 telephone interview with Houstonia magazine she chose not to reveal her new state nor her new family name; she indicated that she was still afraid of retaliation from MS-13.

In 2009 Victor Gonzalez of the City of Houston Mayor's Anti-Gang Task Force stated that the city government established a police presence and used surveillance to prevent gangs from re-establishing themselves at Chew Park. Further gentrification had occurred in the area by then.

The 2011 novel The Knife and the Butterfly by Ashley Hope Pérez is based on Granillo's death. The book's title is derived from that of the Houston Chronicle series.

Sue Lovell argued that school systems should do more to prevent gang activities and that teenagers need to be supervised after school.

In a 2009 opinion piece in The Daily Cougar, University of Houston communication major student Jared Luck wrote that people dismayed by youth crime should try to help troubled teenagers, and that "probation for all but the most hardened criminals is only going to become more commonplace."

== See also ==
- Crime in Houston
- Gangs in the United States
- History of the Central Americans in Houston
