= Federal Detention Center, Houston =

United States federal prison in Texas

Coordinates: 29.7584°N 95.3606°W

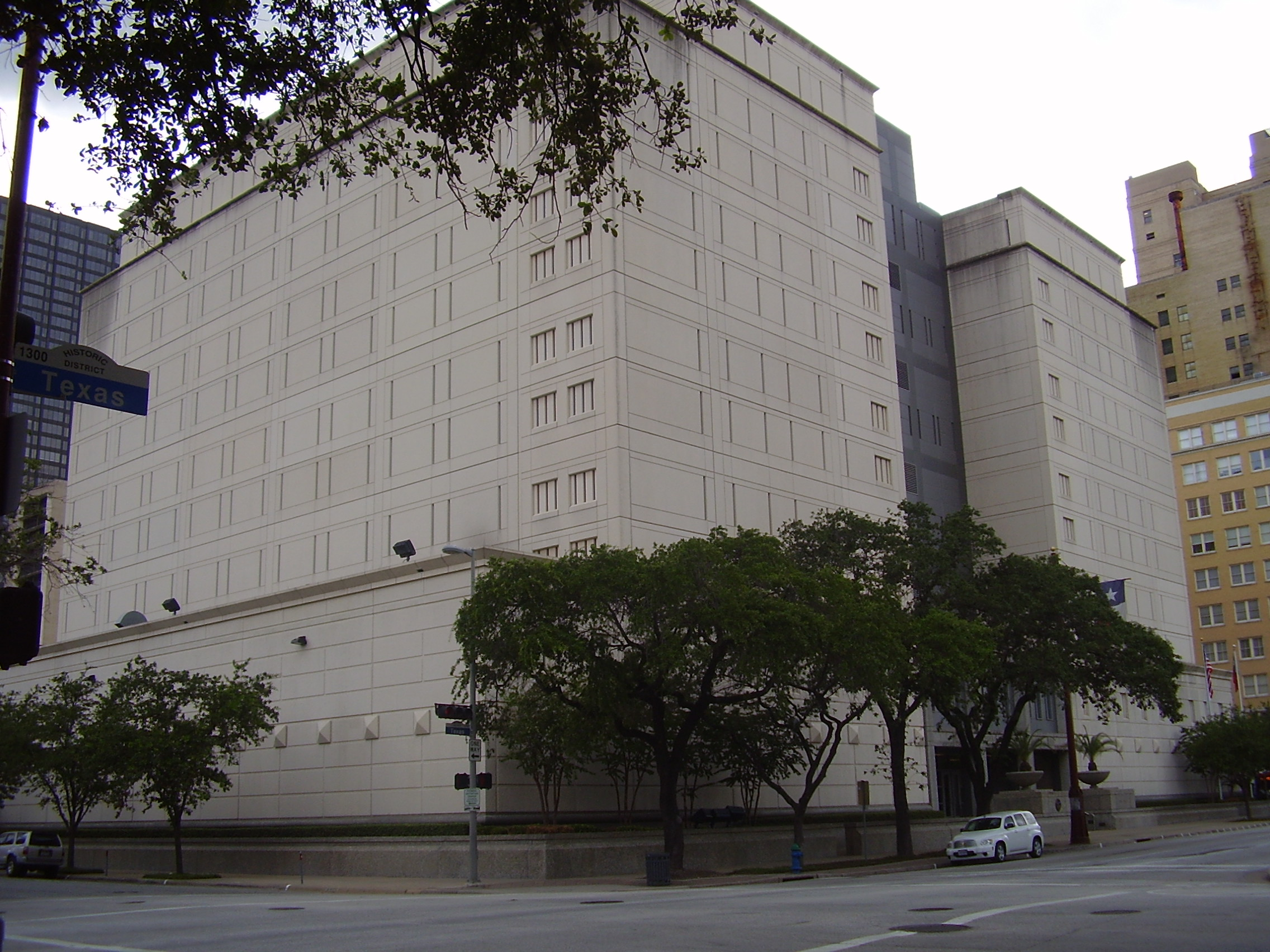
- Interactive map of Federal Detention Center, Houston
- Location: Houston, Texas
- Status: Operational
- Security class: Administrative facility (all security levels)
- Population: 940
- Managed by: Federal Bureau of Prisons
- Warden: Hiromichi Kobayashi

The Federal Detention Center, Houston (FDC Houston) is a federal prison in the downtown area of Houston, Texas, United States. It holds male and female inmates prior to and during court proceedings, as well an inmates serving short sentences. It is operated by the Federal Bureau of Prisons, a division of the United States Department of Justice. It is in proximity to the Daikin Park stadium.

The facility, opened in October 1999, has space for 1,118 prisoners and was built for $35 million. The 11 story facility serves people awaiting trial in the Southern District of Texas.

== Notable incidents ==
In March 2008 a fistfight between two inmates grew into a disturbance which resulted in minor injuries for three employees and eight prisoners.

In April 2008, inmate Joel Lopez was indicted for conspiring to commit kidnapping and murder-for-hire for plotting to kill US District Judge Ricardo Hinojosa from FDC Houston. Hinojosa had sentenced Lopez to life in prison for a February 2006 drug conviction. The indictment alleged that Lopez approached a fellow inmate, who was affiliated with the Latin Kings street gang and was due to be released shortly, and offered to pay the inmate $2 million to kill Hinojosa and an unidentified woman who owed Lopez a drug debt. Lopez instructed the inmate to contact his wife, Aracely Lopez-Gonzalez, and provided him with her contact information. Lopez thought that Hinojosa's death would help the pending appeal of Lopez's sentence.

Lopez-Gonzalez subsequently pleaded guilty to conspiracy to commit kidnapping and testified against Lopez, who was convicted of conspiracy to commit kidnapping and murder-for-hire. Lopez was sentenced to another life term and is currently being held at the United States Penitentiary, Pollock, a high-security facility in Pollock, Louisiana. Aracely Lopez-Gonzalez is serving a 9-year sentence at the Federal Correctional Institution, Danbury, a medium-security facility in Danbury, Connecticut.

== See also ==
- List of U.S. federal prisons
- Federal Bureau of Prisons
- Incarceration in the United States
