= Graphic Novels & Comics Round Table Best Graphic Novels =

American annual award for graphic novels

- Awarded for: Graphic novels
- Country: United States
- First award: 2020 (Adults); 2021 (Children)

The Graphic Novels & Comics Round Table Best Graphic Novels lists are a pair of annual lists presented by the Graphic Novels & Comics Round Table (GN&CRT), a division of the American Library Association. It features two categories - Adults and Children (aged 5–12). The Adults list debuted in 2020, while the Children's list started in 2021.

== Best Graphic Novels for Adults ==
Best Graphic Novels for Adults top ten (2020–present)
Year	Writer(s)	Artist(s)	Title	Ref
2020	The Nib		Be Gay, Do Comics	
2020	Frank "Big Black" Smith, Jared Reinmuth, Améziane		Big Black: Stand at Attica	
2020	Jim Terry		Come Home, Indio	
2020	Jonathan Hickman, Pepe Larraz, R.B. Silva		House of X / Powers of X	
2020	G. Willow Wilson		Invisible Kingdom	
2020	Derf Backderf		Kent State: Four Dead in Ohio	
2020	Lynda Barry		Making Comics	
2020	Octavia E. Butler, Damian Duffy	John Jennings	Parable of the Sower: A Graphic Novel Adaptation	
2020	Jeff Lemire	Gabriel Hernandez Walta	Sentient	
2020	James Tynion IV	Werther Dell'Edera	Something is Killing the Children Vol. 1	
2021	Filipe Melo	Juan Cavia	Ballad for Sophie	
2021	James Tynion IV	Martin Simmonds	Department of Truth, Vol. 1: The End of the World	
2021	Frank Herbert, adapted by Brian Herbert and Kevin J. Anderson	Raúl Allén and Patricia Martín	Dune: The Graphic Novel, Book 1	
2021	N. K. Jemisin	Jamal Campbell	Far Sector	
2021	Pornsak Pichetshote	Alexandre Tefenkgi	The Good Asian, Vol. 1	
2021	Julie Dachez	Mademoiselle Caroline	Invisible Differences	
2021	Nagata Kabi		My Alcoholic Escape from Reality	
2021	Neil Gaiman	P. Craig Russell, Mike Mignola, Jerry Ordway, Piotr Kowalski, David Rubín, Jill Thompson, and Lovern Kindzierksi	Norse Mythology, Vol. 1	
2021	John Lewis and Andrew Aydin	Nate Powell and L. Fury	Run: Book One	
2021	Lee Lai		Stone Fruit	
2022	Aimée de Jongh, translated by Christopher Bradley		Days of Sand	
2022	Catherine Piolo		Down to the Bone: A Leukemia Story	
2022	Kate Beaton		Ducks: Two Years in the Oil Sands	
2022	Kanehito Yamada	Tsukasa Abe	Frieren: Beyond Journey’s End, Vol. 1	
2022	Fabien Toulmé (Books 1-2), Eric Orner (Book 3), translated by Hannah Chute	Fabien Toulmé	Hakim's Odyssey, Books 1-3	
2022	James Spooner		The High Desert: Black. Punk. Nowhere	
2022	Rachel Smythe		Lore Olympus, Vol. 1-2	
2022	Ram V	Filipe Andrade	The Many Deaths of Laila Starr	
2022	Marjorie Liu	Sana Takeda	The Night Eaters: She Eats the Night	
2022	Sabba Khan		What is Home, Mum?	
2023	Léonie Bischoff		Anaïs Nin: A Sea of Lies	
2023	Stephen Graham Jones	Davide Gianfelice	Earthdivers Vol. 1: Kill Columbus	
2023	Tom King	Greg Smallwood	The Human Target Vol. 1-2	
2023	Adrian Matejka	Youssef Daoudi	Last On His Feet: Jack Johnson and the Battle of the Century	
2023	Yann Damezon, translated by Thomas Harrison and Aqsa Ijaz		Majnun and Layla: Songs from Beyond the Grave	
2023	James Tynion IV	Álvaro Martinez Bueno	The Nice House on the Lake (Deluxe Edition)	
2023	Susumu Higa		Okinawa	
2023	Mariko Tamaki	Jillian Tamaki	Roaming	
2023	Deena Mohamed		Shubeik Lubeik	
2023	Darrin Bell		The Talk	
2024	Scott Snyder	Tula Lotay	Barnstormers: A Ballad of Love & Murder	
2024	Patrick Horvath		Beneath the Trees Where Nobody Sees, Vol. 1	
2024	Maria Sweeney		Brittle Joints	
2024	James Tynion IV	Joshua Hixson	The Deviant, Vol. 1	
2024	Tessa Hulls		Feeding Ghosts	
2024	Keigo Shinzo		Hirayasumi, Vol. 1	
2024	Boum, translated by Robin Lang and Helge Dascher		The Jellyfish	
2024	Denise Dorrance		Polar Vortex: A Family Memoir	
2024	Ram V	Filipe Andrade	Rare Flavours	
2024	Peter Wohlleben, translated by Fred Bernard	Benjamin Flao	The Hidden Life of Trees	
2025	Joonas Sildre		Between Two Sounds: Arvo Pärt's Journey to his Musical Language	
2025	Nobuyuki Fukumoto	Kaiji Kawaguchi	Confession	
2025	Kaori Ozaki		Dogs and Punching Bags	
2025	Craig Thompson		Ginseng Roots: A Memoir	
2025	Tom Scioli		Godzilla's Monsterpiece Theater	
2025	Tom King	Bilquis Evely	Helen of Wyndhorn	
2025	James Albon		Love Languages	
2025	Ben Wickey		More Weight: A Salem Story	
2025	Alex Krokus		Talking to My Father's Ghost: An Almost True Story	
2025	Alex L. Combs and Andrew Eakett		Trans History: From Ancient Times to the Present Day	

== Best Graphic Novels for Children ==
Best Graphic Novels for Children top ten (2021–present)
Year	Writer(s)	Artist(s)	Title	Ref
2021	Elise Gravel		Arlo & Pips: King of the Birds, Vol. 1 and Arlo & Pips: Join the Crow Crowd, Vol. 2	
2021	Niki Smith		The Golden Hour	
2021	Lee Durfey-Lavoie	Veronica Agarwal	Just Roll with It	
2021	Trung Le Nguyen		The Magic Fish	
2021	Lily LaMotte	Ann Xu	Measuring Up	
2021	Remy Lai		Pawcasso	
2021	Hope Larson	Rebecca Mock	Salt Magic	
2021	Varian Johnson	Shannon Wright	Twins	
2021	Tom Sullivan		Unsolved Case Files Vols. 1-2	
2021	Sophie Escabasse		The Witches of Brooklyn Vol. 1-2	
2022	Dan Santat		The Aquanaut	
2022	Thomas King	Natasha Donovan	Borders	
2022	Guojing		The Flamingo	
2022	Claribel A. Ortega	Rose Bousamra	Frizzy	
2022	Christina Diaz Gonzalez	Gabriela Epstein	Invisible	
2022	Alexis Castellanos		Isla to Island	
2022	Jonathan Case		Little Monarchs	
2022	Trang Nguyễn	Jeet Zdũng	Saving Sorya: Chang and the Sun Bear	
2022	Johnnie Christmas		Swim Team	
2022	Victoria Grace Elliott		Yummy: A History of Desserts	
2023	Samuel Sattin	Rye Hickman	Buzzing	
2023	Jessixa Bagley	Aaron Bagley	Duel	
2023	Dan Santat		A First Time for Everything	
2023	Lauren Stohler		Gnome and Rat	
2023	Zachary Sterling		Mabuhay!	
2023	Eric Gapstur		The Magma Cup (Sort of Super #2)	
2023	Pedro Martín		Mexikid	
2023	Mac Smith		Scurry	
2023	Victoria Grace Elliott		Tasty: A History of Yummy Experiments	
2023	Ben Hatke		Things in the Basement	
2024	Francisco Jiménez, adapted by Andrew J. Rostan	Celia Jacobs	The Circuit Graphic Novel	
2024	Brian Freschi	Elena Triolo	Ellie in First Position	
2024	Estelle Nadel, Sammy Savos, and Bethany Strout	Sammy Savos	The Girl Who Sang: A Holocaust Memoir of Hope and Survival	
2024	Lee Gee Eun		The Legend of Tiger and Tail-Flower	
2024	Cai Tse		Lion Dancers	
2024	Vera Brosgol		Plain Jane and the Mermaid	
2024	Grant Snider		Poetry Comics	
2024	Trang Nguyễn	Jeet Zdũng, Phuong An, Hoang Long, and Ngoc Hoan	Saving H'Non: Chang and the Elephant	
2024	Lydia Corry		Wildflower Emily: A Story About Young Emily Dickinson	
2024	Kengo Kurimoto		Wildful	
2025	Guy Kopsombut		Badge Quest: A Cheesy Brie-ginning! Book 1	
2025	Raina Telgemeier and Scott McCloud		The Cartoonists Club	
2025	Michael Regina		Deepwater Creek	
2025	Gale Galligan		Fresh Start	
2025	Paige Walshe		Froggy: A Pond Full of Pals!	
2025	Jewell Parker Rhodes	Setor Fiadzigbey	Ghost Boys: The Graphic Novel	
2025	Michael Emberley		Isla to Island	
2025	Guojing		Oasis	
2025	Rita Williams-Garcia	Sharee Miller	One Crazy Summer: The Graphic Novel	
2025	Tina Cho	Deb JJ Lee	The Other Side of Tomorrow	

== See also ==
- Great Graphic Novels for Teens, a list by the Young Adult Library Services Association, a different division of the American Library Association
- Outstanding Comics Award - award given by GN&CRT
