= Big Black: Stand at Attica =

2020 graphic memoir by Frank "Big Black" Smith

- Date: February 18, 2020
- Publisher: Archaia

Creative team
- Writers: Frank “Big Black” Smith and Jared Reinmuth
- Artist: Améziane
- Letterer: AndWorld Design
- ISBN: 978-1-68415-479-1

Big Black: Stand at Attica is a biographical graphic by Frank “Big Black” Smith, co-written with Jared Reinmuth and illustrated by Améziane. It was published in 2020 by Archaia, fifteen years after Smith's death.

== Background ==
Big Black tells the story of the 1971 Attica Prison riot from Frank “Big Black” Smith's perspective, including the events in Smith's life leading up to his imprisonment and his fight for reparations in the riot's aftermath that would stretch until 1997. Smith was an inmate who acted as head of security during the riot, ensuring the safety of hostage, and was tortured by prison guards during the uprising. After his release in 1983, he become a paralegal and investigator. Smith died in 2004.

Jared Reinmuth is the stepson of Dan Meyers, who acted as an attorney for Smith and other Attica inmates. He was chosen to write the biography by Smith and Smith's wife Pearl before the former's death.

Work on the book began in 1997.

== Reception ==
Publishers Weekly gave the book a starred review, noting the art's "expressive realism and muted colors [that] invoke a nostalgic 1970s pulp effect" and concluding that "this penetrating portrait of a broken correctional system and a flawed man focuses on his legacy of courage, which towers over the forces stacked against him." In another starred review, Library Journal stated it was "sure to be one of the most discussed books this year."

Ally Russell Shields of Broken Frontier said the book "feels no less timely today." Shields noted that while the book "quite rightly" did not downplay the "relentless violence, both physical and psychological, committed against the inmates" and "hateful racist language spouted by those in Government, the media, and the general public", the mature content may limit the accessibility for younger audiences they believed "which might otherwise benefit from its timely message." Shields also wished there had been more transparency regarding the work's authorship, given how the book had released over fifteen years after Smith's death.

Big Black was a finalist for the 2021 Eisner Award for Best Reality-Based Work. It was also included in the top ten on the 2020 Graphic Novels & Comics Round Table's Best Graphic Novels for Adults list.
