= Sophie Castille Awards =

Comics award honoring translations

Sophie Castille Awards for Comics in Translation
- Sponsored by: VIP Brands Ltd.
- Country: International
- First award: 2023; 3 years ago
- Website: www.sophie-castille-awards.org

Sophie Castille Awards for Comics in Translation is an award focused on recognizing the best translations of comic books into various languages. Its name honors Sophie Castille.

== History ==
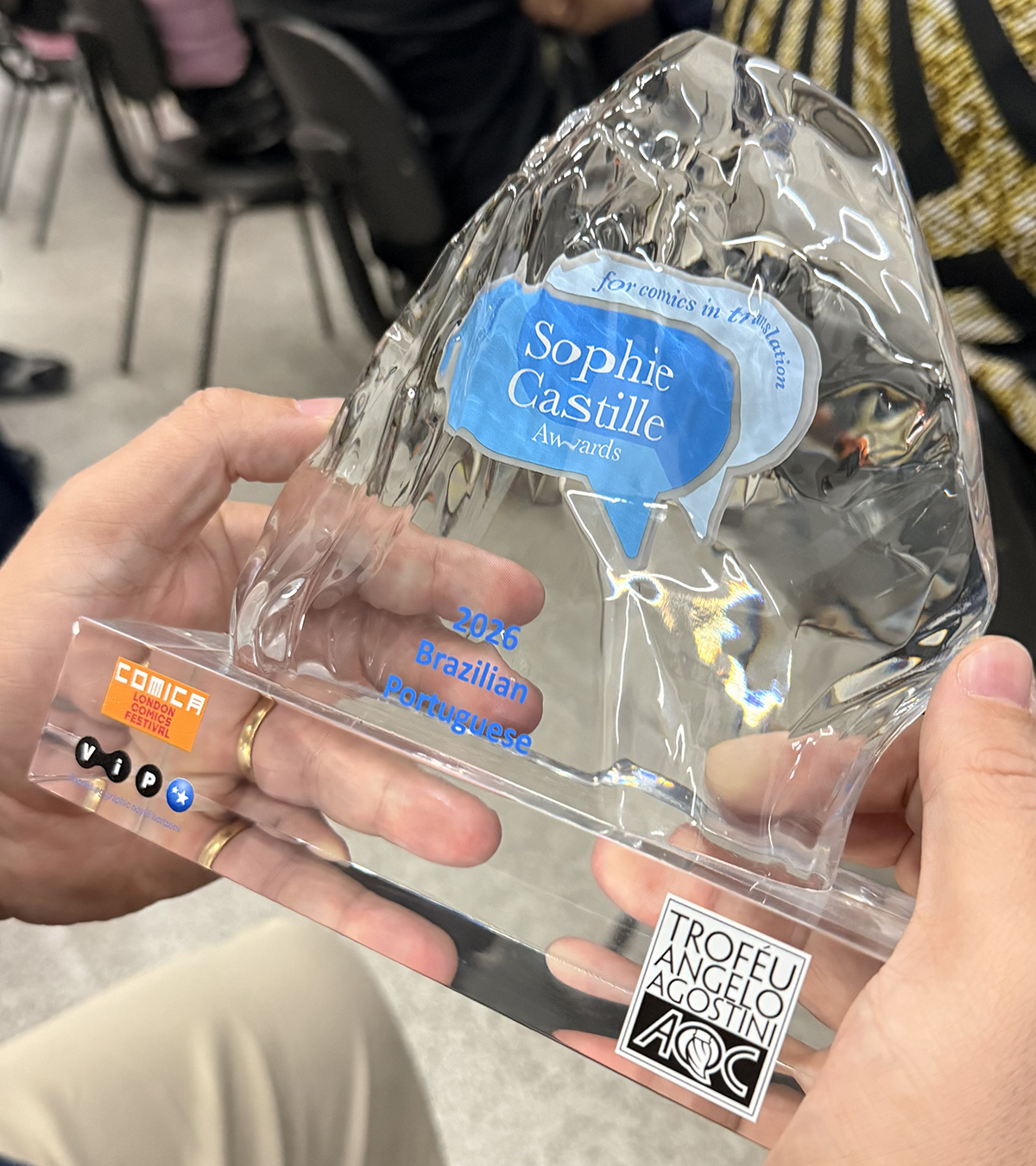
Sophie Castille Award Brazilian Portuguese 2026.

In 2022, Ivanka Hahnenberger, founder of the copyright company VIP Brands, developed a project for a global award focused on comic book translation, intended to honor Sophie Castille, who had passed away that year.

The first edition of the Sophie Castille Awards for Comics in Translation, focused on translations of comics into English, was held in 2023 in partnership between VIP Brands and the British events London Comics Festival (Comica) and Lakes International Comic Art Festival (LICAF). Ninety works were submitted, of which 15 were shortlisted for review by judges Karen Green, Peter Kessler, and Dean Simons, who then chose three finalists.

In 2024, the Spanish event Comic Barcelona organized, together with Red Vértice (Spanish network of associations of translators, interpreters and proofreaders), an edition of the award focused on translations into Spanish or Catalan. In the same year, new Sophie Castille Awards' editions were held in Italy (as part of the Napoli Comicon awards), Poland (with the Łódź International Comics and Games Festival), and Slovenia (with the Tinta festival, as part of the Zlatirepec award and divided into two categories: translation for children and young adults, and translation for adults).

In 2025, the Greek Academy of Comics (Ελληνική Ακαδημία Κόμικς) incorporated the Sophie Castille Award into its traditional ΕΛ.ΒΡΑ.ΚΟ. award. In 2026, the award also began to include editions in Brazilian Portuguese (in partnership with Troféu Angelo Agostini) and in French (in partnership with SoBD). In the same year, it was announced that The Beat website would become the organizer of the English-language edition of the award.

== Sophie Castille ==
Sophie Castille was director of foreign rights for the Franco-Belgian comics publishing houses Dargaud, Dupuis and Le Lombard.

Castille was born in Caen, France, in 1970. She began her career in the 1990s in Dargaud, managing foreign rights. In 2015, she was co-founder of the comics and graphic novel digital venture Europe Comics, a consortium of 13 European comic book publishers.

She died on July 11, 2022, at the age of 51. In Frankfurt Book Fair, a group of international comics publishing professionals, colleagues, and friends organized a virtual memorial to pay tribute to her memory and career.

== Winners and nominees ==
=== English ===
Year	Winners	Nominees	Ref.
2023	Michele Hutchison, for The Philosopher, The Dog and the Wedding (SelfMadeHero) Original work: De filosoof, de hond en de bruiloft, by Barbara Stok	M.B. Valente, for All Princesses Die Before Dawn (Europe Comics) Original work: Toutes les princesses meurent après minuit, by Quentin Zuttion; Montana Kane, for Always Never (Dark Horse Comics) Original work: Malgré tout, by Jordi Lafebre	
2024	Alexa Frank, for Offshore Lightning (Drawn & Quarterly) Original work: 沖合の雷, by Saito Nazuna	Aleshia Jensen, for Juliette: Or, the Ghosts Return in the Spring (Drawn & Quarterly) Original work: Juliette: Les fantômes reviennent au printemps, by Camille Jourdy; Anna Howell, for The Many Lives of Charlie (Europe Comics) Original work: Les Vies de Charlie, by Kid Toussaint; Christopher Pope, for Inside the Mind of Sherlock Holmes (Titan Comics) Original work: Dans la Tête de Sherlock Holmes, by Cyril Lieron and Benoit Dahan; James Hogan, for In Search of Gil Scott-Heron (Titan Comics) Original work: A la recherche de Gil Scott-Heron, by Thomas Maucéri and Seb Piquet; Kendra Boileau, for I Don't Want to Be a Mom (Penn State University Press) Original work: Je ne veux pas être maman, by Irene Olmo; Montana Kane, for The Cliff (Titan Comics) Original work: La falaise, by Manon Debaye; Nanette McGuinness, for Through Clouds of Smoke: Freud's Final Days (Life Drawn Books) Original work: Freud: le moment venu, by Suzanne Leclaire and William Leroy	
2025	Robin Lang and Helge Dascher, for The Jellyfish (Pow Pow Press) Original work: La méduse, by Boum	Andrea Rosenberg, for Return to Eden (Fantagraphics) Original work: Regreso al Edén, by Paco Roca; Diana Schutz and Brandon Kander, for Blacksad: They All Fall Down, Part Two (Dark Horse Comics) Original work: Blacksad: Alors, tout tombe. Seconde Partie, by Juan Díaz Canales and Juanjo Guarnido; Jerome Saincantin and Erica Olson Jeffrey, for Harry Dickson: Mysterion (Cinebook) Original work: Harry Dickson: Mystera, by Jean Ray, Onofrio Catacchio, Doug Headline and Luana Vergari; Margaret Morrison, for Capital & Idiology (Abrams Comic Arts) Original work: Capital et Idéologie en bande dessinée: D'après le livre de Thomas Piketty, by Claire Alet and Benjamin Adam; Martha Kuhlman and Tereza Čechová, for Bald (Graphic Mundi) Original work: Bez vlasů by Nakladatelství Paseka, by Tereza Čechová and Štěpánka Jislová; Montana Kane, for The Incredible Story of Cooking: From Prehistory to Today, 500,000 Years of Adventure (NBM) Original work: L'Incroyable Histoire de la cuisine: de la préhistoire à nos jours, 500 000 ans d'aventure, by Stéphane Douay and Benoist Simmat; Ryan Holmberg, for Oba Electroplating Factory (Drawn & Quarterly) Original work: 大場電気鍍金工業所, by Yoshiharu Tsuge; Victor Martins, for Not Today: Undoing Home Repairs (Fieldmous Press) Original work: Hoje Não, by Ana Margarida Matos	
2026	Montana Kane, for True Colors: Growing Up Weird in the ‘90s (Drawn and Quarterly) Original work by Elise Gravel	Jamie Richards, for Petra Chérie (Fantagraphics) Original work by Attilio Micheluzzi; Andrea Rosenberg, for Witchcraft (Fantagraphics) Original work by Sole Otero; Alice Yang, for Not on Display (Helvetiq) Original work by Zelba; Martha Kuhlman, for Heartcore (Pennsylvania University Press) Original work by Štěpánka Jislová	

=== Spanish or Catalan ===
Year	Winners	Nominees	Ref.
2024	Regina López Muñoz, for Alison (Errata Naturae) Original work: Alison, by Lizzy Stewart	Gema Moraleda, for Patos. Dos años en las arenas petrolíferas (Norma Editorial) Original work: Ducks: Two Years in the Oil Sands, by Kate Beaton; Montse Meneses, for Monica (Editorial Finestres) Original work: Monica, by Daniel Clowes	
2025	Carlos Mayor, for Obra hermética (Reservoir) Original work: L'Œuvre hermétique, by Moebius	Montse Meneses Vilar, for Lo que más me gusta son los monstruos 2 (Reservoir) Original work: My Favorite Thing Is Monsters Book Two, by Emil Ferris; Óscar Palmer, for Raíces de ginseng (Astiberri) Original work: Ginseng Roots, by Craig Thompson	
2026	Montserrat Meneses Vilar, for El disturbio eterno (Resevoir) Original work by Joe Sacco	Esther Cruz Santaella, for Anna (Salamandra) Original work by Mia Oberländer; Eva Reyes de Uña, for Impenetrable (Norma) Original work by Alix Garin; Montserrat Meneses Vilar, for Mycelium Wassonii (Reservoir) Original work by Brian Blomerth; Gema Moraleda, for Somma (Norma) Original work by Becky Cloonan & Tula Lotay	

=== Italian ===
Year	Winners	Nominees	Ref.
2024	Samanta K. Milton Knowles, for Astrologia (Fandango) Original work: Liv Strömquists Astrologi, by Liv Strömquist	Anders Fransson, for Spa (SaldaPress) Original work: Spa, by Erik Svetoft; Enrica Battista, for Racconto Palestina (Mesogea) Original work: Power Born of Dreams: My Story is Palestine, by Mohammad Saba'aneh; Olga Amagliani, for Shady (Rulez) Original work: Shady, by Brecht Vandenbroucke; Vania Vitali, for Gotham City: Anno Uno (Panini Comics) Original work: Gotham City: Year One, by Tom King and Phil Hester	
2025	Toma Gudelyte, for La ragazza con il fucile: Storia di una piccola partigiana (Lavieri) Original work: Mergaitė su šautuvu: Istorija apie mergaitę partizanę, by Lina Itagaki and Marius Marcinkevičius	Anders Fransson, for Le Lanterne di Nedzu (Saldapress) Original work: Nedzus lyktor, by Rui Tenreiro; Giovanni Stigliano Messut, for Esther (In Your Face Comix) Original work: Esther, by Keizo Miyanishi; Luce Lacquaniti, for Shubbek Lubbek. Ogni tuo desiderio (Coconino Press) Original work: شبيك لبيك, by Deena Mohamed; Stefano Andrea Cresti, for Diario (Journal) (Tunué) Original work: Journal, by Fabrice Neaud	
2026	Mary Lou Emberti Gialloreti, for Il mio amico Kim Jong-un (Bao Publishing) Original work: 내 친구 김정은, by Keum Suk Gendry-Kim	Claudia Valeria Letizia and Eva Valvo, for Mira 5: #ragazze&ragazzi #contro #adulti (Sinnos Editrice) Original work: Mira 6: #børn #imod #voksne, by Sabine Lemire and Rasmus Bregnhøi; Fabio Gadducci and Mirko Tavosanis, for La leggenda di Luther Arkwright (Tunué) Original work: The Adventures of Luther Arkwright, by Bryan Talbot; Lorenzo Corti, for La Luna e il Serpente: sussidiario di magia (Panini Comics) Original work: The Moon and Serpent Bumper Book of Magic, by John Coulthart, Steve Moore, Kevin O'Neill and Alan Moore; Luce Lacquaniti, for Gaza attraverso lo schermo (Coconino Press) Original work: Gaza in My Phone, by Mazen Kerbaj	

=== Polish ===
Year	Winners	Nominees	Ref.
2024	Paweł Łapiński, for Terapia grupowa (Wydawnictwo Mandioca) Original work: Therapie du groupe, by Manu Larcenet	Aga Zano, for Kaczki. Dwa lata na piaskach (Kultura Gniewu) Original work: Ducks: Two Years in the Oil Sands, by Kate Beaton; Jakub Jankowski, for Torpedo 1972, vol 2: O losie, ależ to boli! (Non Stop Comics) Original work: Torpedo 1972 vol. 2: ¡Con lo que eso duele!, by Enrique Sánchez Abulí and Eduardo Risso	
2025	Marceli Szpak, for Nienawidzę Baśniowa, vol 5: Gert w piekle (Non Stop Comics) Original work: I Hate Fairyland Volume 5: Gert's Inferno, by Skottie Young and Brett Bean	Aga Zano, for Połączenia (Kultura Gniewu) Original work: Roaming, by Jillian Tamaki and Mariko Tamaki; Jakub Jankowski, for Życie wesołe smutnego psa Corneliusa (Wydawnictwo Mandioca) Original work: La alegre vida del triste perro Cornelius, by Marc Torices	
2026	Piotr Paczkowski, for Naturalna komedia (Kultura Gniewu)	Wojciech Birek, for Na końcu wszyscy umierają (Timof Comics); Olga Mysłowska, for Odzyskać pożądanie (Kultura Gniewu)	

=== Slovenian ===
- 2024:
- Translation for children and young adults:
  - Dušanka Zabukovec, for Kaj bo zakuhal krokodil? (KUD Sodobnost International) - original work by Federico Appel
  - Neža Vilhelm, for Globalno (Morfemplus) – original work by Giovanni Rigano, Eoin Colfer and Andrew Donkin
  - Polonca Kovač, for Dnevnik Ane Frank: likovna priredba (Morfemplus) – original work by David Polonsky and Ari Folman
  - Špela Žakelj, for Garulfo: prva & druga knjiga (Graffit) – original work by Bruno Maïorana and Alain Ayroles
- Translation for adults:
  - Liza Linde, for Teorija umetnosti vs. gospa Goldgruber (Zavod VigeVageKnjige) – original work by Nicolas Mahler
  - Marko Bratina, for Šola padanja (Forum) – original work by Mikael Ross
  - Polona Mertelj, for Sapiens v stripu. Del 1, Rojstvo človeštva (Mladinska knjiga) – original work by Daniel Casanave, Yuval Noah Harari and David Vandermeulen
- 2025:
- Translation for children and young adults:
  - Jaka Bulc, for Astrobučman (Mladinska knjiga) – original work: Astrochimp, by David Walliams
  - Jedrt Maležič, for Supervikend ob oceanu (Morfemplus) – original work: Le Super week-end de l'océan, by Gaëlle Almeras
  - Katja Šaponjić and Anja Zag Golob, for Ariol – Račji ples (VigeVageKnjige) – original work: Ariol – Le canard calé, by Emmanuel Guibert and Rémi Chaurand
- Translation for adults:
  - Jedrt Maležič, for Berlinska trilogija 1: Kristalno poletje (Morfemplus) – original work: La trilogie berlinoise: L’été de cristal, by Pierre Boisserie and François Warzala
  - Julija Potrč Šavli, for Oksi (VigeVageKnjige) – original work: Oksi, by Mari Ahokoivu
  - Polona Mertelj, for Sapiens v stripu 2: Stebri civilizacije (Mladinska knjiga) – original work: Sapiens: A Graphic History, Volume 2: The Pillars of Civilization, by Yuval Noah Harari, David Vandermeulen and Daniel Casanave
- 2026:
- Translation for children and young adults:
  - Katja Zakrajšek, for Vrabčica (VigeVageKnjige) – original work by Joana Estrela
- Translation for adults:
  - Vesna Velkovrh Bukilica, for Jimmy Corrigan, najbrihtnejši poba na svetu (VigeVageKnjige) – original work by Chris Ware

=== Greek ===
Year	Winners	Nominees	Ref.
2025	Gabriel Tompalidis, for Camelot 3000 (Mikros Iros) - original work: Camelot 3000, by Mike W. Barr and Brian Bolland; Kasumi Mori, for Η Πριγκίπισσα του Αέναου Κάστρου (Jemma Press) – original work: The Princess of Never-Ending Castle, by Shintaro Kage; Tatiana Rapakoulia, for Ο Πόλεμος του Λούκας (Mikros Iros) – original work: Lucas' Wars, by Laurent Hopman and Renaud Roche; Tatiana Rapakoulia, for Ταναναρίβη (Mikros Iros) – original work: Tananarive, by Mark Eacersall and Sylvain Vallee; Tatiana Rapakoulia, for Το Κάστρο των Ζώων #1: Μις Μπενγκαλορ (Mikros Iros) – original work: Animal Castle #1, by Xavier Dorison and Felix Delep		
2026	Giannis Iatrou and Jonathan Chikareli, for Η Προφητεία Του Αρμαντιλλο (Chaniartoon; DocMZ) Original work: The Prophecy of Armadillo	Tatiana Rapakoulia, for Είμαι η Σιωπή τους (Mikros Iros) Original work: I Am Their Silence; Giorgos Karampelas, for Habemus Bastard (Mikros Iros) Original work: Habemus Bastard; Danai Tachtara, for El Eternauta 1969 – Ο Κοσμοναυτης Του Απειρου (Jemma Press; DocMZ) Original work: El Eternauta 1969 – The Cosmonaut of Infinity; Giannis Iatrou and Jonathan Chikareli, for Σμάλτο & Τζόννυ (DocMZ) Original work: Smalto & Johnny	

=== Brazilian Portuguese ===
Year	Winners	Finalists	Ref.
2026	Érico Assis, for Eightball Completo (DarkSide) Original work: The Complete Eightball, by Daniel Clowes (Fantagraphics)	Aline Zouvi, for Epiléptico (DarkSide) Original work: L’Ascension du Haut Mal, by David B. (L’Association); Dandara Palankof, for Little Monsters Volume 2 (DarkSide) Original work: Little Monsters Volume 2, by Jeff Lemire and Dustin Nguyen (Image Comics); Elisa Menezes, for A Lenda das Quatro Sombras (Risco) Original work: La Leyenda de las Cuatro Sombras, by Carlos Trillo and Fernando Fernández (Glénat España); Érico Assis, for Happy Endings (Risco) Original work: Happy Endings, by Lucie Bryon (Sarbacane); Levi Trindade, for A Moeda de Prata: Edição Integral (Taverna do Rei) Original work: The Silver Coin, by Michael Walsh, Chip Zdarsky, Kelly Thompson, Ed Brisson, Jeff Lemire, Joshua Williamson, Ram V, Matthew Rosenberg, Vita Ayala, James Tynion IV, Stephanie Phillips, Johnnie Christmas and Pornsak Pichetshote (Image Comics); Rodrigo Lobo, for Thorgal: Série Clássica Volume 1 (Pipoca & Nanquim) Original work: Thorgal, by Grzegorz Rosiński and Jean Van Hamme (Le Lombard)	

=== Norwegian ===
Year	Winners	Finalists	Ref.
2026	TBA	Thomas Lundbo, for Lebensborn (Omnipax) Original work by Isabelle Maroger; Alexander Leborg, for Lucky Luke nr. 85 (Egmont Story House) Original work by Achdé and Jul; Olivia Tångring, for Sagaen om Thorgal nr. 23: Tusen øyne (Hjemmet) Original work by Yann, Fred Vignaux and Gaétan Georges; Ellen Haugan, for lSilhuett av en stemme nr. 7 (Outland forlag) Original work by Yoshitoki Oima; Arvid Skancke-Knutsen, for Sprint: Skatten i San Inferno (Egmont Story House) Original work by Lewis Trondheim and Fabrice Tarrin; Erlend Loe, for Ørn (Strand Vorlag) Original work by Jeppe Standholt	

=== French ===
Year	Winners	Finalists	Ref.
2026	TBA	Elisabeth Willenz, for Quand la femme etait l'homme - Aux originaes de l'histoire (Çà et là) Original work by Ulli Lust; Jean-Pierre Mercier, for Three Rocks : L'histoire d'Ernie Bushmiller, l'homme qui créa Nancy (Casterman) Original work by Bill Griffith; Daphné B., for Opioïdes et organes (Éditions Alto) Original work by Arizona O'Neill; Patrick Marcel, for Stamford Hawksmoor (Delirium) Original work by Bryan Talbot; Lyse Leroπy, for Boris et Babette et tous les squelettes (Nathan bande dessinée) Original work by Tanja Esch	
