= Talking to My Father's Ghost =

2025 graphic memoir by Alex Krokus

- Page count: 208 pages
- Publisher: Chronicle Books

Creative team
- Creator: Alex Krokus

Original publication
- Published in: August 5, 2025
- ISBN: 978-1797228181

Talking to My Father's Ghost: An Almost True Story is a 2025 semi-autobiographical graphic novel by Alex Krokus. Based on the death of his real-life father, it depicts Alex having various conversations with his father's ghost.

== Plot ==
After father of two Jeff dies from cancer, his adult son Alex encounters his ghost at his funeral. The story is told through vignettes as the two talk about things they never did in life over the following year. The characters are portrayed as anthropomorphic animals, with Alex and his mother being raccoons, his brother Gerald being a brown bear, and his father being a barn owl.

== Reception ==
Publishers Weekly stated "Krokus' simple and colorful art contrasts with the book's understated tone," and gave particular attention to a segment where Alex comes out as bisexual to his father's ghost. They ended their review by saying "readers who have known the poignancy of loss will appreciate this." Library Journal compared the book to Can't We Talk about Something More Pleasant? by Roz Chast and concluded that it was a "charming, insightful, and funny tale." It was also reviewed in Booklist.

Talking to My Father's Ghost was a finalist for the 2026 Eisner Award for Best Graphic Memoir. The book was also a top ten title in the 2025 edition of the Graphic Novels & Comics Round Table's Best Graphic Novels for Adults.
