= Saving Sorya: Chang and the Sun Bear =

Graphic novel by Trang Nguyen

Saving Sorya: Chang and the Sun Bear (Chang hoang dã – Gấu)
- Publisher: Kim Đồng Publishing House (Vietnam) Macmillan Children’s Books (UK) Dial Books (US)

Creative team
- Writer: Trang Nguyen
- Artist: Jeet Zdung

Original publication
- Date of publication: 2020
- Language: Vietnamese

Translation
- Date: September 14, 2021
- ISBN: 978-0593353639
- Translator: Trang Nguyen

Saving Sorya: Chang and the Sun Bear is a graphic novel written by Trang Nguyen and illustrated by Jeet Zdumg. It is based on Nguyen's experiences as a wildlife conservationist and tells the story of the rehabilitation and release of Soyra, a sun bear. Originally published in Vietnamese, it was translated into English by Nguyen in 2021.

== Summary ==
Soyra, a young female sun bear who was rescued after being captured by poachers and sent to a bear bile farm, is brought to a Free The Bears facility in Vietnam. Chang, who has aspired to be a wildlife conservationist since childhood after watching a moon bear being tortured for its bile, volunteers at the facility and is assigned to help rehabilitate Soyra. The book follows Sorya's rewilding and eventual release.

== Background ==
Nguyen donated her royalties received from Saving Sorya as well as its sequel Saving H'Non to the real-life Free The Bears and her own charity WildAct Vietnam.

== Reception ==
School Library Journal and Kirkus Reviews both gave Saving Sorya a starred review. Kirkus Reviews commented on the contrast between the manga-style humans and the more realistic watercolor depictions of animals and nature, concluding that "breathtaking visuals and a compelling story seamlessly integrate conservation facts".

BookTrust described the book as "a beautiful, moving and uplifting tale of perseverance and overcoming challenge, and how small steps can make a big difference."

Andy Oliver of Broken Frontier noted how the book did not downplay effects of poaching and other acts of animal cruelty, calling it a "truly gorgeously illustrated book with an important message."

=== Accolades ===
Year	Award/Honor	Result	Ref.
2023	Carnegie Medal for Illustration	Won	
2022	Graphic Novels & Comics Round Table's Best Graphic Novels for Children	Top Ten	
2022	Eisner Award for Best Publication for Kids	Shortlisted	
2021	Freeman Awards	Honored	
2021	National Book Award (Vietnam)	Won	

== Sequel ==
A sequel, Saving H'Non: Chang and the Elephant, was released in English in 2023. It follows Chang as she helps H'Non, an elderly elephant who was abused in captivity for decades. Like the first book, it was an honor title for the Freeman Awards and was included the 2024 Graphic Novels & Comics Round Table's Graphic Novels for Children Top Ten, in addition to being included in the 2024 USBBY Outstanding International Books List.
