= One Crazy Summer (novel) =

2010 novel by Rita Williams-Garcia

- Author: Rita Williams-Garcia
- Language: English
- Genre: Children's historical fiction, realistic fiction
- Publisher: Quill Tree Books
- Publication date: 2010
- Publication place: United States
- Media type: Print
- Pages: 218
- Awards: Coretta Scott King Author Award; Newbery Medal Honor; Scott O’Dell Award
- ISBN: 9780060760885 (trade bdg.)
- Dewey Decimal: Fic
- LC Class: PZ7.W6713 On 2010

One Crazy Summer is a historical fiction novel by American author Rita Williams-Garcia, published by Amistad in 2010. The novel is about Delphine, Vonetta, and Fern, three sisters, visiting their mother in Oakland, California, during the summer of 1968.

In the year of its inception, the book was a National Book Award finalist for young people's literature. In 2011, it won the Coretta Scott King Award for its author, the Scott O'Dell Award for Historical Fiction, and was a Newbery Medal Honor Book.

== Plot ==
Delphine, age eleven, Vonetta, nine, and Fern, seven, live in Brooklyn, New York. However, the girls’ father sends them to Oakland, California one summer to stay with their estranged mother, Cecile, who refers to herself as Nzilla. Cecile never calls Fern by her name, but always refers to her as "little girl." The girl's grandmother always said that Cecile abandoned them because their father objected to her giving the baby a name. However, Cecile had her reason...she was running breakfast and day camp for the Black Panther Party. It was in Cecile's kitchen that the girl met Sister Mukumbu. There, the three sisters get taught about the movement. They are taught the importance of feeding and helping poor African Americans, and also in protecting African American communities. The Black Panther member Bobby Hutton has been shot and killed by police, and one of their founding members, Huey Newton, has been wrongfully jailed. The children at the center will soon participate in a rally to protest these injustices.

After a day trip to San Francisco, the sisters return home to find their mother Cecile and two members of the Black Panther Party being arrested. Cecile tells the police she has no children, for she doesn't want the girls to be involved, so the girls pretend to live next door. Soon a friend from the center, Hirohito, comes for the girls and allows them to stay with him and his mother until Cecile returns, the girls perform a poem their mother wrote, which they found while cleaning the kitchen after her arrest. After their recital, Fern takes the microphone and tells the Black Panthers how she saw one of their most vocal members, with the police, which gets him in trouble with the party members.

At the rally, the sisters see their mother has been released from jail, and return home with her. Though Delphine and Cecile's relationship remains strained, Cecile tells Delphine how she lost her mother at the age of eleven and had a rough life thereafter. She tries to explain why she left her children, but Delphine is still too young to understand. The next day, the girls return home, after finally hugging their mother.

== Character list ==
- Delphine Gaither - 11 years old. A responsible girl who takes care of her two younger sisters; very mature and caring also brave; narrates the story.
- Vonetta Gaither - An attention-seeking, outgoing, and feisty 9 year old.
- Fern (Afua) Gaither - 7 1/2 years old.
- Cecile (Nzilla) Gaither- Delphine, Vonetta and Fern's mother. A poet who left her daughters and moved to California. She unwillingly supports the Black Panthers.
- Louis Gaither (Pa) - Delphine, Vonetta and Fern's father.
- Big Ma-- Louis's mother who has been taking care of her grandchildren since their mother left and who has no tolerance for Cecile and her behavior.
- Darnell Gaither - Louis' younger brother who is fighting in the Vietnam war.
- "Crazy" Kelvin - Member of the Black Panthers.
- Sister Mukumbu: Teacher at the People's Center who involves the Gaither sisters in Black Panther activities.
- Sister Pat - Teacher at the People's Center.
- Eunice, Janice, and Beatrice Ankton - Three sisters who go to the people's center and eventually become friends with the Gaither sisters.
- Hirohito Woods - A Japanese and African-American boy who goes to the People's Center. His father was arrested for being a freedom fighter.
- Mrs. Woods - Hirohito's mother; takes care of the Gaither sisters after Cecile is arrested.
- " Mean Lady" Ming - The owner of the Chinese restaurant that is Cecile's favorite and is initially mean to the girls.

== Themes ==
There is a multitude of themes to be found in this book. 1968 is a radical time for black history, and the portrayal of the Black Panther ideals helps to prompt discussions of Civil Rights, injustice, black pride, and racial prejudice.

The power of names is another strong idea in the book. Cecile changes her name to Nzila, a Yoruba name meaning "the path." It is also suggested that Cecile left her children because she could not name Fern "Afua." Delphine ponders why her mother would want to change her name since names are how we identify ourselves.

The theme of women's liberation and advancement in society is also presented in this book. After one of the younger sisters gets a stomach ache, Delphine goes to the store with their Chinese food allowance and cooks real food in the previously forbidden kitchen. This causes an exchange between Delphine and Cecile in which Cecile accuses Delphine of trying to "tie herself to the yoke" and tells her she should not be so quick to "pull the plow."

Other themes include family, forgiveness, and growth.

== Sequels ==
One Crazy Summer is the first book in the Gaither Sisters Series. The second book, P.S. Be Eleven was published in 2013, and features the girls returning to their home in Bedford-Stuyvesant, Brooklyn. The third book, Gone Crazy in Alabama was published in 2015 and features the sisters visiting their relatives in Autauga County, Alabama. The two sequels were also winners of the Coretta Scott King Award.

== Level ==
This book is recommended for ages 9–12. It has a Lexile of 750L.

== Critical reception ==
According to the critics, One Crazy Summer is a powerful and humorous story that is highly recommended. Teri Markson, writing for School Library Journal, states that it is "emotionally challenging and beautifully written" for children about ethnic identity and personal responsibility. Tricia Melgaard from School Library Journal states that this story is delightful and told through the eyes of Delphine, a "sensitive and intuitive" young girl. C. J. Morales, writing for the New York Amsterdam News, states that it is written to teach black history in a meaningful and amusing way, and "it will keep you laughing out loud."

== Graphic novel ==
On May 6, 2025, One Crazy Summer was adapted into an authorized graphic novel illustrated by Sharee Miller and released by Quill Tree Books.

== Awards ==
Year	Award	Result	Ref.
2010	National Book Award for Young People's Literature	Finalist	
2011	Coretta Scott King Award for Author	Won	
2011	Scott O'Dell Award for Historical Fiction	Won	
2011	Newbery Medal	Honor	
2025	Graphic Novels & Comics Round Table's Best Graphic Novels for Children	Top Ten	
2026	NAACP Image Award for Outstanding Graphic Novel	Finalist	
