= Ryan Estrada =

American writer and cartoonist

Ryan Estrada is an American writer and cartoonist based in South Korea. He is known for the graphic novel Banned Book Club, which is a fictionalized account of his wife Kim Hyun Sook's time as a college student during South Korea's Fifth Republic, as well as its sequels No Rules Tonight and Good Old-Fashioned Korean Spirit. He also co-authored Occulted, a graphic memoir by Amy Rose about her childhood in a cult, wrote the children's graphic novel series The Student Ambassador.

== Career ==
=== Banned Book Club ===
A fictionalized graphic memoir based on Estrada's wife Kim's experiences as a college student in 1983 in South Korea, where she joined a book club that secretly read banned literature and engaged in political action under Chun Doo-hwan's Fifth Republic. It was co-written by Kim and Estrada, with illustration by Hyung-Ju Ko. The book was an "Of Note" title for the 2020 Freeman Awards, was included in the 2021 Great Graphic Novels for Teens list by the Young Adult Library Services Association, and was a nominee for the 2021 Eisner Award for Best Graphic Memoir.

Banned Book Club was subjected to a temporary book ban in Florida's Clay County School District in April 2023.

=== No Rules Tonight ===
Taking place on Christmas Eve in 1984, the book follows Kim, now a janggu drum player, as she and her band travel to Jiri Mountatin. In addition to co-writing, Estrada provided the art for both No Rules Tonight and Good Old-Fashioned Korean Spirit. No Rules Tonight was included in the top ten of the 2025 Great Graphic Novels for Teens list, and was a nominee for the 2024 Cybils Award for Graphic Novel.

=== Good Old-Fashioned Korean Spirit ===
A standalone sequel to the two previous novels which focuses on the character Taehee instead of Kim, but carries over characters from previous installments. It is a nominee for the upcoming 2026 Harvey Award for Best Young Adult Book.

=== Other works ===
Estrada was a contributor for The Nib. Estrada was a co-author for Occulted, a graphic memoir by Amy Rose about her childhood in a cult, and the sole author of the children's graphic novel series The Student Ambassador.

== Personal life ==
Estrada is an American citizen, and currently lives in South Korea with his wife. In 2025, Estrada and Kim cancelled a planned book tour in the United States, citing concerns about Kim's safety due to arrests of artists by United States Immigration and Customs Enforcement.

== Accolades ==
Year	Title	Award/Honor	Result	Ref.
2020	Banned Book Club	Freeman Award	Of Note	
2021	Banned Book Club	Eisner Award for Best Graphic Memoir	Shortlisted	
2021	Banned Book Club	Great Graphic Novels for Teens	Included	
2024	No Rules Tonight	Cybils Award for Graphic Novel	Shortlisted	
2025	No Rules Tonight	Great Graphic Novels for Teens	Top Ten	
2026	Good Old-Fashioned Korean Spirit	Harvey Award for Best Young Adult Book	Shortlisted	

== Publications ==
- Kim, Hyun Sook; Estrada, Ryan (May 19, 2020). Banned Book Club. Illustrated by Ko Hyung-Ju. Iron Circus Comics. ISBN 978-1945820427.
- Estrada, Ryan (August 18, 2020). Student Ambassador: The Missing Dragon. Illustrated by Axur Eneas. Iron Circus Comics. ISBN 978-1945820601.
- Rose, Amy; Estrada, Ryan (May 2, 2023). Occulted. Illustrated by Jeongmin Lee. Iron Circus Comics. ISBN 9781638991090.
- Estrada, Ryan (May 14, 2024). Student Ambassador: The Silver City. Illustrated by Axur Eneas. Iron Circus Comics. ISBN 978-1638991328.
- Kim, Hyun Sook; Estrada, Ryan (October 1, 2024). No Rules Tonight. Illustrated by Ryan Estrada. Penguin Workshop. ISBN 978-0593521298.
- Kim, Hyun Sook; Estrada, Ryan (October 7, 2025). Good-Old Fashioned Korean Spirit. Illustrated by Ryan Estrada. Penguin Workshop. ISBN 978-0593521328.
- Kim, Hyun Sook; Estrada, Ryan (September 22, 2026). Banned Book Club: Color Edition. Illustrated by Ko Hyung-Ju. Iron Circus Comics. ISBN 978-1638991748.
