= Kim Hyun Sook =

South Korean writer

Kim Hyun Sook (Korean: 김현숙) is a South Korean writer. She is notable for the graphic novel Banned Book Club, which is a fictionalized account of her time as a college student during South Korea's Fifth Republic, as well as its sequels No Rules Tonight and Good Old-Fashioned Korean Spirit.

== Career ==
=== Banned Book Club ===
A fictionalized graphic memoir based on Kim's experiences as a college student in 1983 in South Korea, where she joined a book club that secretly read banned literature and engaged in political action under Chun Doo-hwan's Fifth Republic. It was co-written by Kim and her husband Ryan Estrada, with illustration by Hyung-Ju Ko. The book was an "Of Note" title for the 2020 Freeman Awards, was included in the 2021 Great Graphic Novels for Teens list by the Young Adult Library Services Association, and was a nominee for the 2021 Eisner Award for Best Graphic Memoir.

Banned Book Club was subjected to a temporary book ban in Florida's Clay County School District in April 2023.

=== No Rules Tonight ===
Taking place on Christmas Eve in 1984, the book follows Kim, now a janggu drum player, as she and her band travel to Jiri Mountatin. In addition to co-writing, Estrada provided the art for both No Rules Tonight and Good Old-Fashioned Korean Spirit. No Rules Tonight was included in the top ten of the 2025 Great Graphic Novels for Teens list, and was a nominee for the 2024 Cybils Award for Graphic Novel.

=== Good Old-Fashioned Korean Spirit ===
A standalone sequel to the two previous novels which focuses on the character Taehee instead of Kim, but carries over characters from previous installments. It is a nominee for the 2026 Harvey Award for Best Young Adult Book.

=== Other works ===
Kim was a contributor for The Nib.

== Personal life ==
Estrada is an American citizen, and the couple live in South Korea. In 2025, they cancelled a planned book tour in the United States, citing concerns about Kim's safety due to arrests of artists by United States Immigration and Customs Enforcement.

== Accolades ==
| Year | Title | Award/Honor | Result | Ref. |
|---|---|---|---|---|
| 2020 | Banned Book Club | Freeman Award | Of Note | |
| 2021 | Banned Book Club | Eisner Award for Best Graphic Memoir | Shortlisted | |
| 2021 | Banned Book Club | Great Graphic Novels for Teens | Included | |
| 2024 | No Rules Tonight | Cybils Award for Graphic Novel | Shortlisted | |
| 2025 | No Rules Tonight | Great Graphic Novels for Teens | Top Ten | |
| 2026 | Good Old-Fashioned Korean Spirit | Harvey Award for Best Young Adult Book | Shortlisted | |

== Publications ==
- Kim, Hyun Sook; Estrada, Ryan (May 19, 2020). Banned Book Club. Illustrated by Ko Hyung-Ju. Iron Circus Comics. ISBN 978-1945820427.
- Kim, Hyun Sook; Estrada, Ryan (October 1, 2024). No Rules Tonight. Illustrated by Ryan Estrada. Penguin Workshop. ISBN 978-0593521298.
- Kim, Hyun Sook; Estrada, Ryan (October 7, 2025). Good-Old Fashioned Korean Spirit. Illustrated by Ryan Estrada. Penguin Workshop. ISBN 978-0593521328.
- Kim, Hyun Sook; Estrada, Ryan (September 22, 2026). Banned Book Club: Color Edition. Illustrated by Ko Hyung-Ju. Iron Circus Comics. ISBN 978-1638991748.
