= The Jellyfish =

2022 graphic novel by Boum

The Jellyfish (La méduse)
- Date: 2022 (Original); May 1, 2024 (English)
- Publisher: Pow Pow Press

Creative team
- Creator: Boum

Original publication
- Language: French
- ISBN: 978-2925114307
- Translators: Robin Lang and Helge Dascher

The Jellyfish is a graphic novel by Boum. Originally published in 2022 in French under the title La méduse, it was translated into English by Robin Lang and Helge Dascher in 2024, and follows a young adult who starts seeing jellyfish that obscure their vision. The book won the 2025 Eisner Award for Best U.S. Edition of International Material.

== Plot ==
Odette, a young adult living on their own in Montreal who prides themself for their independence, has their vision blocked by black floaters they call "jellyfish", represented in the book as floating jellyfish that obscure the art. Unsure of what to tell their friends, family, and girlfriend Naina, they keep the jellyfish a secret, but when the jellyfish grow in size and number and Odette goes to the eye doctor, they must assess their relationship with independence and the people around them. (Note: Odette is referred to they/them pronouns in the English release, and the feminine elle/elles in the original French text)

== Development ==
The book was inspired by Boum’s own experiences; she lost the use of her right eye in 2021 after having had vision issues since 2007.

== Reception ==
Kirkus Reviews gave the book a starred review, praising Boum's use of jellyfish obscuring the artwork to represent Odette's vision problems as a "near perfect symbiosis between narrative and art", and concluding that the book is a "deeply moving meditation on disability, diversity, and joy."

It was also positively reviewed by Publishers Weekly and Zack Quaintance of Comics Beat.

=== Accolades ===
Year	Award/Honor	Result	Ref.
2025	The Nipper	Won	
2025	Graphic Novels & Comics Round Table’s Best Graphic Novels for Adults	Top Ten	
2025	Doug Wright Award for Best Book	Shortlisted	
2025	Sophie Castille Award for Translation into English (awarded to Robin Lang and Helge Dascher)	Won	
2025	Eisner Award for Best U.S. Edition of International Material	Won	
