= The Circuit: Stories from the Life of a Migrant Child =

1997 autobiographical novel by Francisco Jiménez

- First edition
- Author: Francisco Jiménez
- Language: English
- Genre: Children's autobiographical novel
- Publisher: University of New Mexico Press
- Publication date: 1997
- Publication place: United States
- Media type: Print (Paperback)
- Pages: 134
- ISBN: 978-0-8263-1797-1
- OCLC: 36776380

The Circuit: Stories from the Life of a Migrant Child is an autobiographical novel by Francisco Jiménez based in part on his journey from Mexico to the United States of America. The book, narrated by the child's point of view, follows the life of young Francisco and his family as they move from one location to another to harvest crops in the United States. The book has three sequels, Breaking Through, Reaching Out, and the fourth in the series, Taking Hold: From Migrant Childhood to Columbia University. The author translated the four novels into Spanish under the titles Cajas de cartón ("cardboard boxes"), Senderos fronterizos, Más allá de mí, and Pasos firmes, respectively, all published by Houghton Mifflin.

== Graphic novel ==
In 2024, the book was adapted into a graphic novel by Andrew J. Rostan, with illustrations by Celia Jacobs. The adaption received starred reviews from School Library Journal and Kirkus Reviews and was a top ten title for the 2024 list for Graphic Novels & Comics Round Table Best Graphic Novels for Children.
