= Brittle Joints =

2024 graphic memoir by Maria Sweeney

- Date: 2024
- Publisher: Street Noise

Creative team
- Writer: Maria Sweeney
- Artist: Maria Sweeney
- ISBN: 9781951491260

Brittle Joints is a 2024 graphic novel memoir by Maria Sweeney, covering her life with Bruck syndrome.

== Background ==
Sweeney was born in 1994 with Bruck syndrome, a rare and progressive disability. Due to her disability, Sweeney has chronic pain and is an ambulatory wheelchair user. She has cited a desire to "clear the road for other disabled people" as a motivation for the work.

== Reception ==
Brittle Joints received starred reviews from Publishers Weekly and Foreword Reviews. Publishers Weekly described it as a "a candid portrait of life with a disability, drawn in delicate brushstrokes and natural colors" and compared it to Ellen Forney’s Marbles.

The book was included on the 2024 New York Public Library Best Books for Adults list and was in the Graphic Novels & Comics Round Table's 2024 Best Graphic Novels for Adults Reading List Top Ten.

It was nominated for the 2025 Ringo Award for Best Non-fiction Comic Work and the Eisner Award for Best Painter/Digital Artist.
