= No Rules Tonight =

2024 graphic novel by Kim Hyun Sook and Ryan Estrada

- Date: October 1, 2024
- Publisher: Penguin Workshop

Creative team
- Writers: Hyun Sook Kim and Ryan Estrada
- Artist: Ryan Estrada
- Colorist: Amanda Lafrenais
- ISBN: 9780593521298

No Rules Tonight is a 2024 graphic novel by Kim Hyun Sook and Ryan Estrada and a follow-up to their 2020 book Banned Book Club. It follows a fictionalized version of Kim as she travels to Jiri Mountain for Christmas Eve in 1984.

== Plot ==
As with the previous book, No Rules Tonight takes place during South Korea's Fifth Republic and focuses on a fictionalized version of Kim Hyun Sook. Set during the winter of 1984, it follows Hyun Sook, who has become a janggu drum player for a folk dance group, as she seeks to establish a new book club after the dissolution of her previous one. For Christmas Eve, Hyun Sook and her band travel to Jiri Mountain, but their trip is tempered by the arrest of their director and former book club member Hoon and Hyun Sook's fears that a member of their group may be a spy.

== Reception ==
No Rules Tonight was given a starred review by School Library Journal, which praised the "well-developed characters that have diverse backgrounds and motivations" and noted the inclusion of queer and transgender characters.

Kirkus Reviews positively commented on the "bright, cheerfully cartoonlike drawings" and handling of serious topics, but criticized the addition of underdeveloped subplots and characters, concluding that it was a "vivid if overstuffed portrayal of life under a dictatorship that educates and informs."

Publishers Weekly ended its review by saying "sleek panels with comedic flourishes add levity and charm to memories, events, and secrets inspired by the author’s personal experiences, bringing to life a night of romance, friendship, and change amid societal unrest and adolescent upheaval."

The book was included in the Great Graphic Novels for Teens Top Ten for 2025. It was also a finalist for the 2024 Cybils Award for Graphic Novel.
