= Frizzy (graphic novel) =

2022 graphic novel

- Date: October 18, 2022
- Page count: 224 pages
- Publisher: First Second Books/Macmillan Publishers

Creative team
- Writer: Claribel A. Ortega
- Artist: Rose Bousamra
- ISBN: 9781250259622

Frizzy is a 2022 graphic novel written by Claribel A. Ortega and illustrated by Rose Bousamra. It follows Marlene, a Dominican-American girl in the Bronx who wants to stop straightening her curly hair, but faces opposition from her mother and society. It received positive reception and won the 2023 Eisner Award for Best Publication for Kids and Pura Belpré Award for Children's Author

== Plot ==
Ever since she was very young, Dominican-American Marlene's mother has made her go to the salon every Sunday to get her hair straightened. Marlene loathes the salon, finding the process of straightening painful, and dreams of having curly hair like her Tía Ruby, her mother's sister. However, her mother Paola, who she calls Mami, and their hairdresser Gleny insist her natural curly hair is ugly and needs to be straightened to be pretty and professional. At her cousin Diana's quinceañera, her family members praise Diana's "good" straight hair. Dancing at the party causes Marlene's straightened hair to frizz and a relative to mock her. She runs into a closet and finds another relative, Yesenia, whose hair is also frizzing, and the two bond over how everyone thinks Diana is perfect at their expense. The family takes pictures and Marlene is embarrassed over how her hair looks in them.

A few days later, Marlene conspires to follow a video tutorial on how to make her hair curly at her friend Camille's suggestion. However, she messes up and her hair frizzes wildly. Her mother braids her hair before the school bus arrives, which annoys Marlene due to how her ears stick out. On the bus, Marlene unbraids her hair, and she and Camille try to fix it by curling it with their fingers, but the open bus window makes matters worse. At school, several kids harass Marlene, with some tossing cut-up pieces of tape in her hair. One boy insults Marlene's father, who died when she was five, prompting Marlene to push him down.

At home, Diana comes to visit, and belittles Marlene and talks about how proud she is to have "good" hair. That night, Mami helps Marlene wash her hair, which Marlene notes she hasn't done herself ever since Marlene's father died. Mami tells Marlene about how she used to have curly hair, and was harshly bullied over it. Eventually, her parents made her start going to the salon every weekend. She initially disliked it, but started to enjoy it when people started to tell her she was beautiful. Marlene comments that she used to have curly hair when Marlene's father was alive, and Mami replies that while he did love her curly hair, she now believes that she must straighten it to be socially acceptable.

Mami sends Marlene to Tía Ruby for the weekend. Marlene tells Ruby about how she dreads going to the salon but is afraid to tell her mother, and Ruby reveals she stopped going to the salon when she was fourteen. She further discusses how there is no such thing as good or bad hair and how such ideas are founded in anti-Blackness. She then teaches Marlene how to properly care for her hair such as which type of hairbrushes and products to use, and helps Marlene through a wash session. Back at home, Marlene shows her mother her curly hair, shocking her. Marlene admits to her how much she hates salon days, surprising Mami with the extent of which she disliked the salon. She decides to skip the salon the next Sunday, and has Ruby and Marlene help do her hair instead. Despite her initial fears she ends up loving her new curly look, and the book ends with the three of them embracing.

== Reception ==
The book received starred reviews from Kirkus Reviews, School Library Journal, the Horn Book, BookPage, and Publishers Weekly. Kirkus Reviews stated that "Ortega masterfully navigates topics like anti-Blackness and oppressive beauty standards passed down through generations." Publishers Weekly said "Ortega expertly examines themes of colorism, generational trauma, and toxic beauty standards via authentic, heartstring-tugging dialogue and Marlene's pitch-perfect narration, culminating in a satisfying and heartwarming exploration of self-expression and self-love."

=== Accolades ===
Year	Award/Honor	Result	Ref.
2023	Eisner Award for Best Publication for Kids	Won	
2023	Pura Belpré Award for Children's Author	Won	
2023	Harvey Award for Best Children's or Young Adult Book	Shortlisted	
2023	Ringo Award for Best Kids Comic or Graphic Novel	Shortlisted	
2023	American Library Association - Great Graphic Novels for Teens	Top Ten	
2023	Cybils Awards for Graphic Novel - Elementary and Middle Grade	Shortlisted	
2022	Graphic Novels & Comics Round Table's Best Graphic Novels for Children	Top Ten	
2022	Publisher Weekly Best Books of the Year	Included	
2022	School Library Journal Best Books of the Year	Included	

== See also ==
- Discrimination based on hair texture
