= Banned Book Club =

2020 graphic novel

- Cover of Banned Book Club
- Publisher: Iron Circus Comics

Creative team
- Creator: Kim Hyun Sook and Ryan Estrada; illustrations by Ko Hyung-Ju

Original publication
- Date of publication: May 19, 2020 (First edition); September 22, 2026 (Color edition)

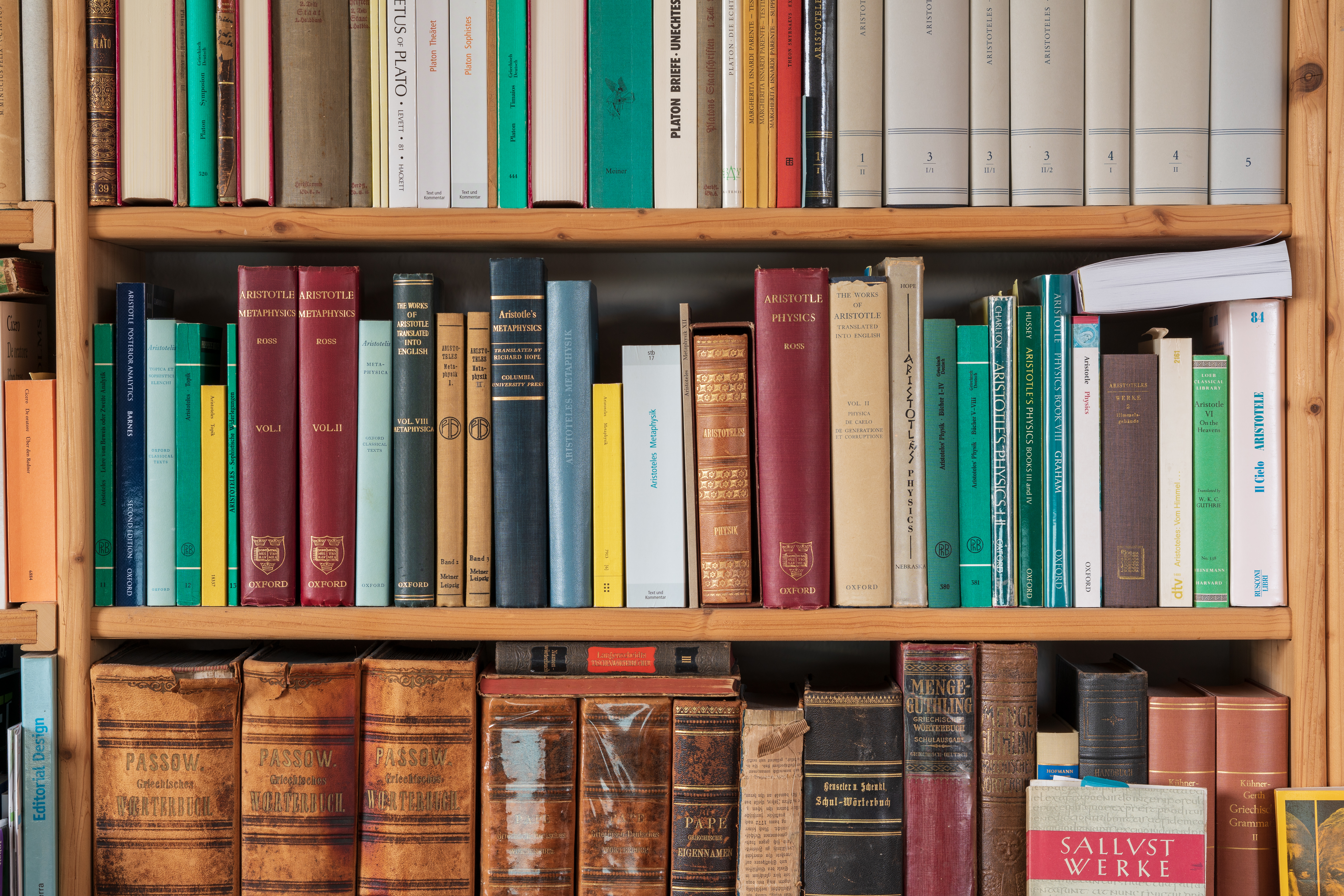
Books have been around for centuries and are crucial for education

Banned Book Club is a 2020 fictionalized biographical graphic novel by Kim Hyun Sook and Ryan Estrada that depicts Kim's college experience in South Korea during the Fifth Republic. The title is a reference to the secret student club at her university where she read underground literature. The book was fictionalized to protect the people in the story.

== Plot summary ==
The story is set during South Korea's Fifth Republic, a military regime that entrenched its power through censorship, torture, and the murder of protesters.

Kim Hyun Sook begins college in 1983 and plans to major in English literature. When the editor of the school newspaper invites her to his reading group, she expects to pop into the cafeteria to talk about Moby Dick, Hamlet, and The Scarlet Letter. Instead she ends up hiding in a basement as the youngest member of an "underground" banned book club. And as Hyun Sook soon discovers, in a totalitarian regime, discovering great works of illicit literature are quickly overshadowed by fear and violence.

As the club delves deeper into the books and their discussions become more political, they attract the attention of the authorities and increasing danger. She and her friends constantly face the threat of government censorship and punishment for their activities. Kim Hyun Sook describes several encounters with censors, including instances where government officials barge into the book club's meetings to confiscate banned books, and where she and her friends are interrogated by police for their involvement in the club. At one point in the story, Kim Hyun Sook is expelled from her university for her activism and her involvement in the book club, which causes her to lose her scholarship and puts her future prospects in jeopardy.

Despite the constant threat of censorship and punishment, Kim Hyun Sook and her fellow book club members continue to fight for their right to read and discuss banned literature, and their bravery and persistence ultimately contribute to the larger democracy movement in South Korea. This act of bravery sets the tone for the importance of all literature being welcomed.

The book was originally published in black-and-white; a color edition with a new 25-page epilogue story was published in 2026.

== Reception ==
=== Critical reception ===
The book was well received by critics in South Korea, where the book is set, and in the United States. The U.S. School Library Journal's review stated, "Overall, this is a highly recommended title. Readers will want to discuss what life is like under a dictatorship," and Publishers Weekly wrote, "Hyun Sook's irresistible memoir conveys her political (and social) awakening with equal measures of hilarity and comedy alongside moments of sheer terror as her eyes are opened to the brutal nature of the regime." The illustrator, Ko Hyung-Ju also received high praise, "In recreating such difficult history, artist Ko finds a remarkable balance of humor and bleakness, of youthful tenacity and growing cynicism. From joyous mask dances to bored classrooms to tortuous jail cells, Ko captures Kim's activist-as-a-young-student journey with an affecting resonance sure to inspire today's youthful generation of tenacious changemakers." In 2021 the book was named a "Great Graphic Novel for Teens" by YALSA (Young Adult Library Services Association) a division of the American Library Association. It was also named one of the best books of the year by NPR, Texas Library Association, New York Public Library, and The Junior Library Guild.

=== Awards ===
Winner of the Freeman Award, meant to "recognize quality books for children and young adults that contribute meaningfully to an understanding of East and Southeast Asia."

The book was nominated for the 2021 Eisner Award for Best Graphic Memoir.

=== Censorship ===
In April 2023, Banned Book Club was temporarily removed from library bookshelves in Florida's Clay County School District as part of a larger effort to censor over 100 books in school libraries.

== Sequels ==
Banned Book Club was followed by No Rules Tonight and Good Old Fashioned Korean Spirit, which were released in 2024 and 2025 respectively and continue the story. Ko Hyung-Ju was not involved in the sequels, with Ryan Estrada providing the art.
