= Just Roll With It (graphic novel) =

2021 graphic novel

- Date: December 14, 2021
- Page count: 336 pages
- Publisher: Random House Graphic

Creative team
- Writer: Lee Durfey-Lavoie
- Artist: Veronica Agarwal
- ISBN: 978-0593125410

Just Roll With It is a 2021 graphic novel by Veronica Agarwal and Lee Durfey-Lavoie. It follows Maggie, a sixth grader and TTRPG fan dealing with obsessive-compulsive disorder who develops anxiety surrounding rumors of a creature outside her school.

== Plot ==
The book follows Maggie Sankhar, a girl struggling with anxiety who relies on the results on her 20-sided die to make decisions, such as choosing which hallway to go down at school or which choice to make between two snacks depending on whether the result of the die is more or less than ten. At the start of the book, she is nervous to start to sixth grade, but rolls an 18 on her die, convincing her it will be alright. On the first day of school, she meets a classmate named Clara. Her die rolls a 6, making her uncertain if they should be friends when Clara asks, but ends up befriending her anyway. While heading to class, the two are harassed by a group of eighth graders gossiping about an escaped snake in the long grass outside the school. At lunchtime, more students talk about the alleged creature in the grass, scaring Maggie. When she leaves school, she spots an eye surrounded by white scales in the grass, and believes it is a dragon. A few days later, Maggie and Clara join a club at school for the tabletop role-playing game Chosen: Adventures in Therendia, which Maggie plays with her older sisters Jamie, Eli, and Alex, and befriends the other students there.

One day, Eli and Alex come to pick Maggie up and Alex falls sick. When Maggie tries to go to the car, she freezes when the die rolls a low number, and Alex ends up vomiting before Maggie can get into the car. At home, Eli tells their parents she believes Maggie has obsessive-compulsive disorder, recognizing her symptoms, but Maggie refuses to talk to her family about it. Maggie starts envisioning a white dragon mocking her over ruining things. Over the coming days, Maggie's anxiety over the alleged "dragon" and her compulsions worsen as rumors about the creature spread around the school, especially when a bitten-up basketball and bike are discovered on campus. She struggles with completing homework and becomes fearful that not complying with the die's results will result in disaster befalling her friends and family, yet still refuses to seek out help.

After a school trip to a local wildlife rescue center, Maggie and Clara become determined to save the school from the creature. The RPG club forms a plan to catch it in bug nets, and Maggie ends up capturing it and discovers the "dragon" is actually an albino baby alligator. The kids bring to the wildlife rescue, where it is given its own habitat. Afterwards, Maggie finally agrees to go to a therapist and has a session.

== Reception ==
Kirkus Reviews described Just Roll With It as a "thoughtful and engaging account of a preteen navigating mental illness in a world that leaves her constantly doubting herself." They also commented to the diverse representation in the book, with Maggie's family being South Asian and one of her sisters being in a lesbian relationship, as well as Clara having two mothers. School Library Journal compared the book to Guts by Raina Telgemeier. It was also positively received by Publishers Weekly, which regarded it as a "comforting read."

The book was shortlisted for the 2022 Ringo Award for Best Kids Comic or Graphic Novel. It was also included in the top ten of the 2021 edition of the Graphic Novels & Comics Round Table Best Graphic Novels for Children list.

== Sequel ==
A standalone sequel, Sink or Swim, was published in 2024.
