= Dancing After TEN =

2020 graphic memoir by Vivian Chong

- Date: June 2, 2020
- Publisher: Fantagraphics

Creative team
- Creators: Vivian Chong, Georgia Webber
- ISBN: 978-1683963165

Dancing After TEN is a 2020 graphic memoir by Vivian Chong, created with Georgia Webber. It follows Chong's life after becoming blind due to a rare disease.

== Summary ==
In 2004, during a vacation in Saint Martin, Chong suffered a rare severe allergic reaction to ibuprofen called toxic epidermal necrolysis (TEN), which resulted in her needing to be airlifted to Canada, entering a coma, and lasting scarring of her skin and corneas, which lead to her to become totally blind and later affected her hearing. The book follows Chong's adaption to her loss of sight and discovery of new interests in activities such as drumming, stand-up comedy, and dancing, as well as her relationships with her ex Seth, who was vacationing with her and left her during her hospitalization, new boyfriend Micheal, and guide dog Catcher.

== Development ==
Chong began work on the book after cornea surgery temporarily improved her eyesight, but put it on hold for 14 years when her vision worsened again. In 2019, Chong reached out to Webber, who had previously written Dumb: Living Without a Voice, another graphic memoir about her own experience after a severe vocal injury left her with lasting difficulty speaking, to help Chong in completing the work.

== Reception ==
Library Journal dubbed the book "a prime example of the graphic medicine genre" and further stated it was "engaging and informative but never feels teachy or preachy." Publishers Weekly, though critical of the "uneven" character development, positively commented on the collaboration between Chong and Webber, noting how "Chong’s shaky and unfinished sketches alternate with Webber’s more professional renditions" and describing the book as an example of how "artists with differing experiences and abilities can partner to make art that’s elevated by the experiment."

=== Accolades ===
Awards and honors
Year	Award	Category	Result	Ref.
2021	Eisner Award	Best Graphic Memoir	Nominated	
2021	Ringo Award	Best Non-fiction Comic Work	Nominated	
2020	Toronto Book Award		Nominated	
2020	Believer Book Awards	Graphic Narrative	Nominated	
