= Misuzu Kaneko =

Japanese poet

- 金子 みすゞ
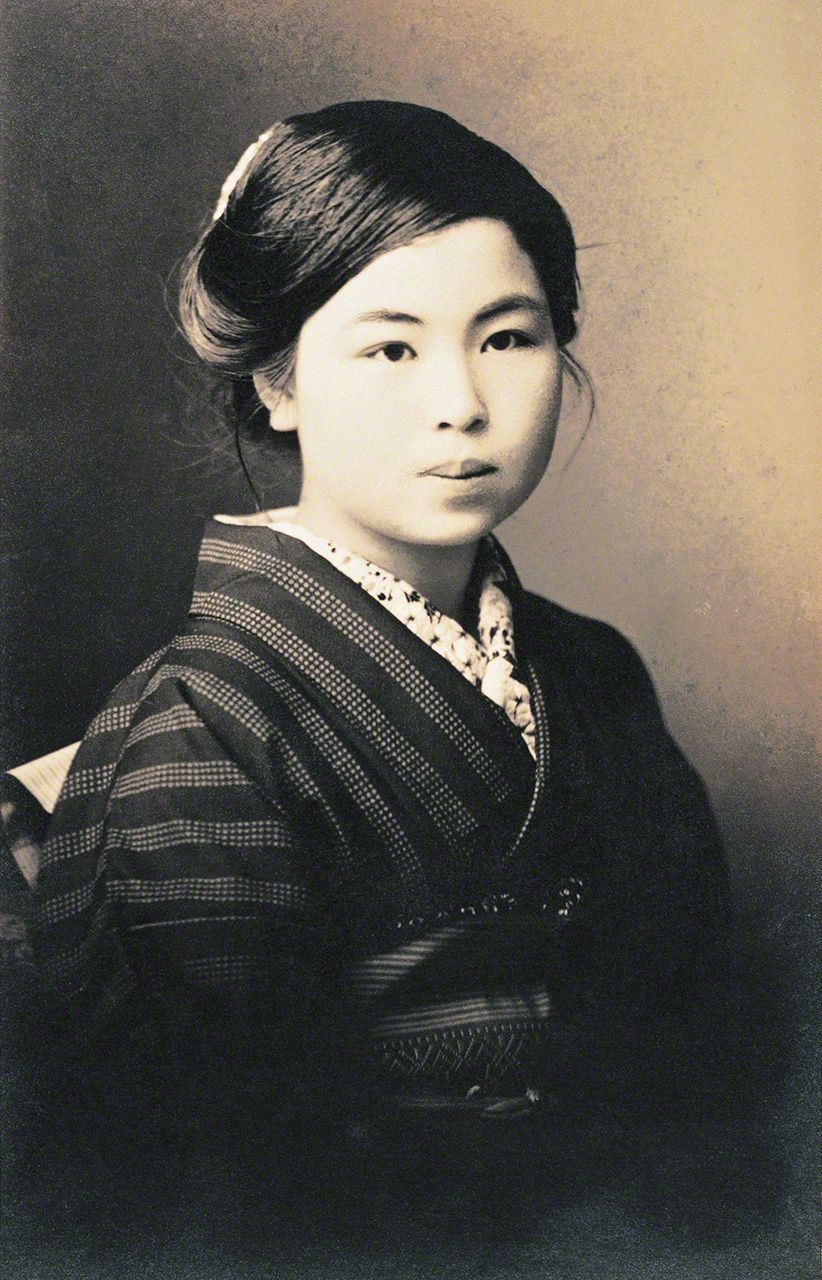
- Born: Teru Kaneko; April 11, 1903; Nagato, Yamaguchi, Japan
- Died: March 10, 1930 (aged 26); Senzaki, Yamaguchi, Japan
- Occupations: Poet, bookseller
- Years active: 1923-1930

Misuzu Kaneko (金子 みすゞ, Kaneko Misuzu; April 11, 1903 – March 10, 1930) was a Japanese poet, known for her poetry for children. She was born Teru Kaneko (金子 テル, Kaneko Teru) in the fishing village of Senzaki, now part of Nagato, Yamaguchi prefecture. Motifs of fishing and the sea often make appearances in her poems. Celebrated during her lifetime, her works fell into obscurity after her death, until being rediscovered in the 1980s. Since then, she has been regarded as one of Japan's most beloved children's poets.

Kaneko has been compared to Christina Rossetti. Her poems have been translated into eleven languages.

== Biography ==
Kaneko was raised by her mother and grandmother after her father died when she was three. Kaneko's mother ran a bookstore and felt strongly about reading and education. While most Japanese girls of that time period were only educated up to sixth grade, Kaneko continued her schooling until the age of seventeen, attending the Ōtsu High School for Girls. She was described by others as gentle, cheerful, and an excellent student, as well as a voracious reader with strong curiosity about nature.

In 1923, Kaneko became the manager and sole employee of her uncle's small bookstore in Shimonoseki, a town at the southern tip of Honshu. There, she discovered children's literary magazines such as Akai tori, which were riding the crest of a boom in children's literature and which solicited stories and verse from their readers. Kaneko first submitted five poems, among them "The Fishes", to four magazines, and was accepted for publication in all of them. Soon, her poems began appearing in magazines all over the country and she became a literary celebrity. Over the next five years she published fifty-one more verses.

Kaneko's private life was not as fortunate, however. In 1926, she entered into a marriage arranged by her uncle, with a clerk in the family bookstore. A daughter, Fusae, was born in November. Her new husband was unfaithful and contracted a venereal disease, which he passed on to Kaneko, causing her lifelong physical pain. He also forced her to stop writing, while putting the family through the strain of four moves within two years to pursue failing business ventures. She finally divorced him in 1930, but this meant also losing custody of her daughter to her husband. Japanese law at the time automatically granted the father indisputable custody to the child.

On March 9, 1930, the day before her husband was due to take custody, Kaneko felt no recourse except to commit suicide in protest. After bathing Fusae and sharing a sakuramochi, Kaneko wrote a letter to her husband asking that he let her mother raise the girl instead, and overdosed on Calmotin, dying the next day, only a month before her 27th birthday. Her daughter was ultimately raised by the grandmother.

Representative works include "Me and Little Birds and Bells" and "Big Fishing".

== Rediscovery of Kaneko's poems ==
Although she received praise for her published poems during her life, Kaneko's work descended into obscurity during the years of World War II In 1966, a 19-year-old Japanese aspiring poet named Setsuo Yazaki discovered her poem "Big Catch" in an old book. Eager to know more about the author, he spent sixteen years trying to track her down. In 1982 he was able to get in touch with Kaneko's younger brother, now 77 years old, who still had the diaries in which she had copied out her poems, most unpublished during her lifetime. Yazaki now serves as the director of the Kaneko Misuzu Memorial Museum, which was opened in 2003 on the site of Kaneko's childhood home.

The entire collection of 512 poems has since been published by JULA Publishing Bureau in a six-volume anthology, and in 2016, an English-language edition of her poetry Are You an Echo? The Lost Poetry of Misuzu Kaneko was released by the independent book publisher Chin Music Press. It received an Honorable Mention in the Freeman Awards 2016.

== "Are You an Echo?" and the 2011 tsunami ==
After the 2011 Tōhoku earthquake and tsunami, television stations played Kaneko's poem "Are You an Echo?" as a public service announcement in order to encourage volunteers.

== Misuzu Children's Choir ==
In Nagato City, there is a chorus group that sings and promotes the poetry of Misuzu. The members are mainly children living in Nagato City.

== Nagato Furusato Melody ==
In Nagato City, Nagato Furusato Melody is played as evening chimes in five districts of the city. Furusato Melody is a poem by Misuzu Kaneko, to which Yoshinao Nakata added the melody and the subtitle "Iiko wa tobeteru no yo" (A good child can fly), in accordance with the grant of "Furusato Souzou Kikin" in 1989. Since citizens listen to this melody every day, Misuzu is familiar to them.

== See also ==
- List of Japanese writers: K
