= Bruck syndrome =

- Other names: Osteogenesis imperfecta-congenital joint contractures syndrome
- Bruck syndrome is inherited in an autosomal recessive manner
- Specialty: Rheumatology
- Frequency: 0.0001%

Bruck syndrome is characterized as the combination of arthrogryposis multiplex congenita and osteogenesis imperfecta. Both diseases are uncommon, but concurrence is extremely rare which makes Bruck syndrome very difficult to research. Bruck syndrome is thought to be an atypical variant of osteogenesis imperfecta most resembling type III, if not its own disease. Multiple gene mutations associated with osteogenesis imperfecta are not seen in Bruck syndrome. Many affected individuals are within the same family, and pedigree data supports that the disease is acquired through autosomal recessive inheritance. Bruck syndrome has features of congenital contractures, bone fragility, recurring bone fractures, flexion joint and limb deformities, pterygia, short body height, and progressive kyphoscoliosis. Individuals encounter restricted mobility and pulmonary function. A reduction in bone mineral content and larger hydroxyapatite crystals are also detectable Joint contractures are primarily bilateral and symmetrical, and most prone to ankles. Bruck syndrome has no effect on intelligence, vision, or hearing.

== Genetics ==
The genetics of Bruck syndrome differs from osteogenesis imperfecta. Osteogenesis imperfecta usually involves autosomal dominant mutations to COL1A1 or COL1A2 which encode type 1 procollagen. Bruck syndrome is linked to mutations in two genes, and therefore is divided in two types. Bruck syndrome type 1 is caused by a homozygous mutation in the FKBP10 gene. Type 2 is caused by a homozygous mutation in the PLOD2 gene.

== Mechanism ==
Type 1 encodes FKBP65, an endoplasmic reticulum associated peptidyl-prolyl cis/trans isomerase (PPIase) that functions as a chaperone in collagen biosynthesis. Osteoblasts deficient in FKBP65 have a buildup of procollagen aggregates in the endoplasmic reticulum which reduces their ability to form bone. Furthermore, Bruck syndrome type 1 patients have under-hydroxylated lysine residues in the collagen telopeptide and as a result show diminished hydroxylysylpyridinoline cross-links.

Type 2 encodes the enzyme, lysyl hydroxylase 2, which catalyzes hydroxylation of lysine residues in collagen cross-links. PLOD2 is most expressed in active osteoblasts since collagen cross-linking is tissue-specific. Mutation in PLOD2 alters the structure of telopeptide lysyl hydroxylase and prevents fibril formation of collagen type 1. Bone analysis shows the lysine residues of telopeptides in collagen type 1 are under-hydroxylated.

== Diagnosis ==
Diagnosis of Bruck syndrome must distinguish the association of contractures and skeletal fragility. Ultrasound is used for prenatal diagnosis. The diagnosis of a neonate bears resemblance to arthrogryposis multiplex congenital, and later in childhood to osteogenesis imperfecta.

== Management ==
Until more molecular and clinical studies are performed there will be no way to prevent the disease. Treatments are directed towards alleviating the symptoms. To treat the disease it is crucial to diagnose it properly. Orthopedic therapy and fracture management are necessary to reduce the severity of symptoms. Bisphosphonate drugs are also an effective treatment.

== History ==
The first case was in 1897 of a male who was described by Bruck as having bone fragility and bone contractures. Bruck was credited with the first description and the disease's eponym.

== In popular culture ==
The 2024 graphic novel memoir Brittle Joints by Maria Sweeney covers her life with Bruck syndrome.
