= Eisner Award for Best Graphic Memoir =

American comic book award

- Awarded for: Best Graphic Memoir
- Country: United States
- First award: 2021
- Most recent winner: It Rhymes with Takei, by George Takei, Harmony Becker, Steven Scott, and Justin Eisinger
- Website: www.comic-con.org/awards/eisner-awards-current-info

The Eisner Award for Best Graphic Memoir is an award for "creative achievement" in non-fiction American comic books.

Up until 2020 memoirs were included in the category for Best Reality-Based Work, but in 2021 the judges created a new award as they felt there were too many high-quality non-fiction comics for one award.

== Winners and nominees ==
Year	Title	Authors	Ref.
2020s
2021	The Loneliness of the Long-Distance Cartoonist (Drawn & Quarterly)	Adrian Tomine	
2021	Banned Book Club (Iron Circus Comics)	Kim Hyun Sook, Ryan Estrada, and Ko Hyung-Ju	
2021	Dancing after TEN (Fantagraphics)	Vivian Chong and Georgia Webber	
2021	Ginseng Roots (Uncivilized Books)	Craig Thompson	
2021	I Don't Know How to Give Birth! (Yen Press)	Ayami Kazama, translated by Julie Goniwich	
2021	When Stars Are Scattered (Dial Books)	Victoria Jamieson and Omar Mohamed	
2022	Run: Book One (Abrams ComicArts)	John Lewis, Andrew Aydin, L. Fury, and Nate Powell	
2022	Factory Summers (Drawn & Quarterly)	Guy Delisle, translated by Helge Dascher and Rob Aspinall	
2022	Parenthesis (Top Shelf)	Élodie Durand, translated by Edward Gauvin	
2022	The Secret to Superhuman Strength (Houghton Mifflin Harcourt)	Alison Bechdel	
2022	Save it for Later: Promises, Parenthood, and the Urgency of Protest (Abrams ComicArts)	Nate Powell	
2023	Ducks: Two Years in the Oil Sands (Drawn & Quarterly)	Kate Beaton	
2023	Down to the Bone: A Leukemia Story (Graphic Mundi/Penn State University Press)	Catherine Pioli, translated by J.T. Mahany	
2023	It's Lonely at the Centre of the Earth: An Auto-Bio-Graphic-Novel (Image)	Zoe Thorogood	
2023	So Much for Love: How I Survived a Toxic Relationship (First Second/Macmillan)	Sophie Lambda	
2023	Welcome to St. Hell: My Trans Teen Misadventure (Scholastic Graphix)	Lewis Hancox	
2024	Family Style: Memories of an American from Vietnam (First Second/Macmillan)	Thien Pham	
2024	A First Time for Everything (First Second/Macmillan)	Dan Santat	
2024	In Limbo (First Second/Macmillan)	Deb J.J. Lee	
2024	Memento Mori (Oni Press)	Tiitu Takalo, translated by Maria Schroderus	
2024	Sunshine: How One Camp Taught Me about Life, Death, and Hope (Scholastic Graphix)	Jarrett J. Krosoczka	
2024	The Talk (Henry Holt)	Darrin Bell	
2025	Feeding Ghosts: A Graphic Memoir (MCD/Farrar, Straus and Giroux)	Tessa Hulls	
2025	Degrees of Separation: A Decade North of 60 (Conundrum)	Alison McCreesh	
2025	The Field (Conundrum)	Dave Lapp	
2025	I'm So Glad We Had This Time Together: A Memoir (Pantheon)	Maurice Vellekoop	
2025	Something, Not Nothing: A Story of Grief and Love (Arsenal Pulp Press)	Sarah Leavitt	
2026	It Rhymes with Takei	George Takei	
2026	My Life in 24 Frames Per Second	Rintaro, translated by Montana Kane	
2026	The Ephemerata: Shaping the Exquisite Nature of Grief	Carol Tyler	
2026	Precious Rubbish	Kayla E.	
2026	Raised by Ghosts	Briana Loewinsohn	
2026	Talking to My Father's Ghost: An Almost True Story	Alex Krokus	
