= Freeman Awards =

Book award for young adult and children's literature

The Freeman Book Awards are annual awards for new young adult and children's literature, that contribute meaningfully to an understanding of East and Southeast Asia.

== Establishment ==
In 2016 the National Consortium for Teaching about Asia (NCTA), the Committee on Teaching about Asia (CTA) of the Association for Asian Studies (AAS), and Asia for Educators (AFE) at Columbia University announced the establishment of the annual Freeman Book Awards for new young adult and children’s literature. The awards recognize quality books for children and young adults that contribute meaningfully to an understanding of East and Southeast Asia. Awards are given in two categories: Children’s and Young Adult on the several countries of East and Southeast Asia. The awards were inaugurated in 2016. They are named for the Freeman Foundation.

The Freeman Foundation was established in 1994 through the bequest and in memory of the businessman and benefactor Mansfield Freeman, a co-founder of the international insurance and financial conglomerate American International Group, Inc., better known as AIG. It is dedicated to "augmenting international understanding between the United States and the nations of East Asia.

== Winner and honorable mentions, 2022 ==
Children’s Literature

- Winner: Eighteen Vats of Water, by Ji-Li Jiang, Illustrated by Nadia Hsieh (Creston Books) - fiction, set in China
- Honorable Mention: Alone Like Me, Rebecca Evans (Anne Schwartz Books) - fiction, set in China
- Honorable Mention: When the Sakura Bloom, Narisa Togo (Berbay Publishing) - fiction, set in Japan
- Of Note: Nana, Nenek & Nina, Liza Ferneyhough (Dial Books) - fiction, set in Malaysia and England
- Of Note: Operation Pangolin: Saving the World’s Only Scaled Mammal, Suzi Eszterhas (Millbrook Press) - non-fiction, set in Vietnam
- Of Note: Warrior Princess: The Story of Khutulun, Sally Deng (Farrar, Straus and Giroux) - non-fiction, set in China

Young Adult/Middle School Literature

- Winner: Berani, Michelle Kadarusman (Pajama Press) - fiction, in Indonesia
- Honorable mention: Morning Sun in Wuhan, Ying Chang Compestine (Clarion Books) - fiction, set in China
- Of Note: The Not-So-Uniform Life of Holly-Mei, Christina Matula (Inkyard Press) - fiction, set in Hong Kong
- Of Note: Dragonfly Eyes, Cao Wenxuan, Translated by Helen Wang (Candlewick Press) - fiction, set in China and France

Young Adult/High School Literature

- Winner: The Color of the Sky Is the Shape of the Heart, Chesil, Translated by Takami Nieda (Soho Teen) - fiction, set Japan and America
- Honorable Mention: K-Pop Revolution, Stephan Lee (Point) - fiction, set in Korea
- Honorable Mention: The Red Palace, June Hur (Feiwel & Friends) - fiction, set in Korea
- Of Note: Strike the Zither, Joan He (Roaring Brook Press) - fiction, set in China

== Winner and honorable mentions, 2021 ==
Children’s Literature

- Winner: The Floating Field, by Scott Riley, Illustrated by Nguyen Quang and Kim Lien (Millbrook Press) - no-fiction, set in Thailand
- Honorable Mention: Saving Sorya: Chang and the Sun Bear, by Trang Nguyen, Illustrated by Jeet Zdung (Dial Books) - fiction, set in Vietnam
- Honorable Mention: The Star Festival, by Moni Ritchie Hadley, Illustrated by Mizuho Fujisawa (Albert Whitman) - fiction, set in Japan

Young Adult/Middle School Literature

- Winner: Finding Junie Kim, by Ellen Oh (Harper Collins) - fiction, set in Korea and America
- Honorable mention: Temple Alley Summer, By Sachiko Kashiwaba, translated by Avery Fischer Udagawa, Illustrated by Miho Satake (Yonder) - fiction, set in Japan
- Honorable Mention: While I Was Away, by Waka T. Brown (Quill Tree Books) - fiction, set in Japan and America
- Of Note: How Do You Live?, by Genzaburō Yoshino, translated by Bruno Navasky (Algonquin) - fiction, set in Japan
- Of Note: Soul Lanterns, by Shaw Kuzki, translated by Emily Balistrieri (Delacorte Press) - fiction, set in Japan

Young Adult/High School Literature

- Winner: Tsunami Girl, by Julian Sedgwick, illustrated by Chie Kutsuwada (Guppy Books) - fiction, set in Japan and America
- Winner: The Waiting, by Keum Suk Gendry-Kim, illustrated by Chie Kutsuwada (Drawn and Quarterly) - fiction, set in Korea
- Honorable Mention: Colorful, by Eto Mori, translated by Jocelyne Allen (Counterpoint Press) - fiction, set in Japan
- Honorable Mention: Freedom Swimmer, by Wai Chim (Scholastic) - fiction, set in China
- Honorable Mention: The Minamata Story, by Sean Michael Wilson, illustrated by Akiko Shimojima (Stone Bridge Press) - non-fiction, set in Japan
- Of Note: The Forest of Stolen Girls, by June Hur (Feiwei & Friends) - fiction, set in Korea

== Winner and honorable mentions, 2020 ==
Children's Literature

- Winner: No Steps Behind: Beate Sirota Gordon’s Battle for Women’s Rights in Japan by Jeff Gottesfeld, illus. Shiella Witanto (Creston Books) - Non-fiction, set in Japan
- Honorable Mention: A Bowl of Peace: A True Story by Caren Stelson, illus. Akira Kusaka (Carolrhoda Books) - Non-fiction, set in Japan
- Honorable Mention: Rice by Hongcheng Yu (Reycraft Books) - Non-fiction, set in China
- Honorable Mention: The Ocean Calls: A Haenyeo Mermaid Story, by Tina Cho, illus. by Jess X. Snow (Kokila Press) - Fiction, set in Korea

Young Adult/Middle School Literature

- Winner: Brother’s Keeper, by Julie Lee (Holiday House) - fiction, set in Korea
- Honorable Mention: Beyond Me, by Annie Donwerth-Chikamatsu (Simon & Schuster) - fiction, set in Japan
- Of Note: All Thirteen: The Incredible Cave Rescue of the Thai Boys’ Soccer Team, by Christina Soontornvat (Candlewick Press) - non-fiction, set in Thailand

Young Adult/High School Literature

- Winner: Crossing the Farak River, by Michelle Aung Thin (Annick Press) - fiction, set in Myanmar
- Winner: Year of the Rabbit, by Tian Veasna, Translated by Helge Dascher (Drawn & Quarterly) - non-fiction, set in Cambodia
- Honorable Mention: The Silence of Bones, by June Hur (Macmillan) - fiction, set in Korea
- Honorable Mention: Tiananmen 1989: Our Shattered Hopes, by Lun Zhang and Adrien Gombeaud, Illustrated by Ameziane (IDW Publishing) - non-fiction, set in China
- Of Note: Almond, by Won-pyung Sohn, translated by Sandy Joosun Lee (Harper Collins) - fiction, set in Korea
- Of Note: Like Spilled Water, by Jennie Liu (Lerner Publishing Group) -fiction, set in China
- Of Note: Banned Book Club, by Kim Hyun Sook, Ryan Estrada, Illustrated by Hyung-Ju Ko (Iron Circus Comics) - non-fiction, set in Korea

== Winners and honorable mentions, 2019 ==
Children’s Literature

- Winner: The Phone Booth in Mr. Hirota’s Garden by Heather Smith, illus. Rachel Wada (Orca Books) - Fiction, set in Japan
- Honorable Mention: Magic Ramen: The Story of Momofuku Ando by Andrea Wang, illus. Kana Urbanowicz (Little Bee Books) - Non-fiction, set in Japan
- Honorable Mention: The Moose of Ewenki by Gerelchimeg Blackcrane, illus. by Jiu Er (Greystone Books) - Fiction, set in Inner Mongolia, China
- Honorable Mention: When Spring Comes to the DMZ by Uk-Bae Lee (Plough Publishing House) - Fiction, set in Korea

Young Adult/Middle School Literature

- Winner: All The Ways Home by Elsie Chapman (Macmillan, Feiwel and Friends) - Fiction, set in Japan
- Winner: A Place to Belong by Cynthia Kadohata, Illustrated by Julia Kuo (Simon & Schuster, Atheneum/Caitlyn Dlouhy Books) - Fiction, set in Japan
- Honorable Mention: Girl of the Southern Sea by Michelle Kadarusman (Pajama Press) - Fiction, set in Indonesia
- Of Note: House Without Walls by Ching Yeung Russell (Simon & Schuster) - Fiction, set in Vietnam
- Of Note: The Magnolia Sword: A Ballad of Mulan Sherry Thomas (Lee & Low) - Fiction, set in China

Young Adult/High School Literature

- Winner: The Weight of Our Sky by Hanna Alkaf (Simon & Schuster, Salaam Reads) - Fiction, set in Malaysia
- Winner: Patron Saints of Nothing by Randy Ribay (Penguin Young Readers, Kokila) - Fiction, set in the Philippines
- Honorable Mention: Indigo Girl by Suzanne Kamata (Gemma Media) - Fiction, set in America and Japan

== Winners and honorable mentions, 2018 ==
Children’s Literature

- Winner: Moth and Wasp, Soil and Ocean: Remembering Chinese Scientist Pu Zhelong’s Work for Sustainable Farming by Sigrid Schmalzer, illus. by Melanie Linden Chan (Tilbury House Nature Books) - Non fiction, set in China
- Honorable Mention: The Turtle Ship by Helena Ku Rhee, illus. by Colleen Kong-Savage (Shen’s Books/Lee & Low Books) - Fiction, set in Korea
- Honorable Mention: Confucius: Great Teacher of China by Demi, (Lee & Low Books) - Non fiction, set in China
- Honorable Mention: Thirty Minutes Over Oregon: A Japanese Pilot’s World War II Story by Marc Tyler Nobleman, illus. by Melissa Iwai (Clarion Books) - Non fiction, set in the U.S.
- Of Note: My Beijing: Four Stories of Everyday Wonder by Nie Jun, trans. by Edward Gauvin (Lerner Books) - Fiction, set in China

Young Adult/Middle School Literature

- Winner: Grenade by Alan Gratz (Scholastic Press) - Historical fiction, set in Japan
- Honorable Mention: Onibi: Diary of a Yokai Ghost Hunter by Atelier Sento, Cecile Brun, Olivier Pichard, trans. by Marie Velde (Tuttle Publishing) - Fiction, set in Japan
- Honorable Mention: Shadow of the Fox by Julie Kagawa (Harlequin Teen) - Fiction, set in Japan
- Honorable Mention: Too Young to Escape: A Vietnamese Girl Waits to be Reunited with Her Family by Van Ho and Marsha Skrypuch (Pajama Press) - Non fiction, set in Vietnam

Young Adult/High School Literature

- Winner: Go: A Coming of Age Novel by Kazuki Kaneshiro, Translated by Takami Nieda (AmazonCrossing) - Fiction, set in Japan
- Winner: The Astonishing Color of After by Emily X.R. Pan (Little, Brown Books for Young Readers) - Fiction, set in Taiwan
- Honorable Mention: Girls on the Line by Jennie Lie (Lerner Publishing Group/Carolrhoda Lab) - Fiction, set in China
- Honorable Mention: Thousand Beginnings and Endings edited by Ellen Oh and Elsie Chapman (Harper Collins Publishers) - Fiction, set in East and South Asia
- Of Note: The Analects: An Illustrated Edition by Confucius, Adapted and Illustrated by C.C. Tsai, trans. by Brian Bruya, With a foreword by Michael Puett (Princeton University Press) - Non fiction, set China
- Of Note: The Dragon Ridge Tombs by Tianxia Bachang, trans. by Jeremy Tiang (Penguin Random House) - Fiction, set China

== Winners and honorable mentions, 2017 ==
Children's Literature

- Winner: The Crane Girl by Curtis Manley, illustr. by Lin Wang (Shen’s Books) - Fiction, set in Japan
- Honorable Mention: An’s Seed by Zaozao Wang, illustr. by Li Huang, tr. Helen Wang (Candied Plums; Bilingual edition) - Fiction, set in China
- Honorable Mention: Chibi Samurai Wants a Pet by Sanae Ishida (Little Bigfoot) - Fiction, set in Japan
- Honorable Mention: My First Book of Vietnamese Words by Tran Thi Minh Phuoc (Tuttle Publishing; Bilingual edition) - Fiction, set in Vietnam

Young Adult/Middle School Literature

- Winner: Bronze and Sunflower by Cao Wenxuan, illustr. by Meilo So, tr. Helen Wang (Candlewick Press) - Fiction, set in China
- Honorable Mention: Hotaka: Through My Eyes – Natural Disaster Zones by John Heffernan, edited by Lyn White (Allen & Unwin) - Fiction, set in Japan
- Honorable Mention: Ten: A Soccer Story by Shamini Flint (Clarion Books, an imprint of Houghton Mifflin Harcourt) - Fiction, set in Malaysia
- Honorable Mention: The Emperor’s Riddle by Kat Zhang (Simon & Schuster; Aladdin) - Fiction, set in China

Young Adult/High School Literature

- Winner: The Forbidden Temptation of Baseball by Doris Jones Yang (Spark Press) - Fiction, set in Japan and the U.S.
- Honorable Mention: Want by Cindy Pon (Simon & Schuster; Simon Pulse) - Fiction, set in Taiwan
- Honorable Mention: Tanabata Wish by Sara Fujimura (Wishes Enterprises, LLC) - Fiction, set in Japan

== Winners and honorable mentions, 2016 ==
Children's Literature

- Winner: My Night in the Planetarium by Innosanto Nagara (Seven Stories Press) - Non-Fiction, set in Indonesia
- Honorable Mention: Are You an Echo? The Lost Poetry of Misuzu Kaneko by Misuzu Kaneko (Chin Music Press) - Non-Fiction, set in Japan

Young Adult/Middle School Literature

- Winner: Somewhere Among by Annie Donwerth-Chikamatsu (Atheneum Books for Young Readers) - Fiction, set in Japan
- Winner: The Night Parade by Kathryn Tanquary (Sourcebooks Jabberwocky) - Fiction, set in Japan
- Honorable Mention: Falling into the Dragon’s Mouth by Holly Thompson (Henry Holt BYR/Macmillan Children’s Publishing Group) - Fiction, set in Japan

Young Adult/High School Literature

- Winner: Every Falling Star: The True Story of How I Survived and Escaped North Korea by Sungju Lee and Susan Elizabeth McClelland (Amulet, an imprint of ABRAMS) - Non-Fiction, set in North Korea
- Honorable Mention: Sachiko: A Nagasaki Bomb Survivor’s Story by Caren Stelson (Carolrhoda Books, a division of Lerner Publishing Group) - Non-Fiction, set in Japan
