= Rita Williams-Garcia =

American children's writer (born 1957)

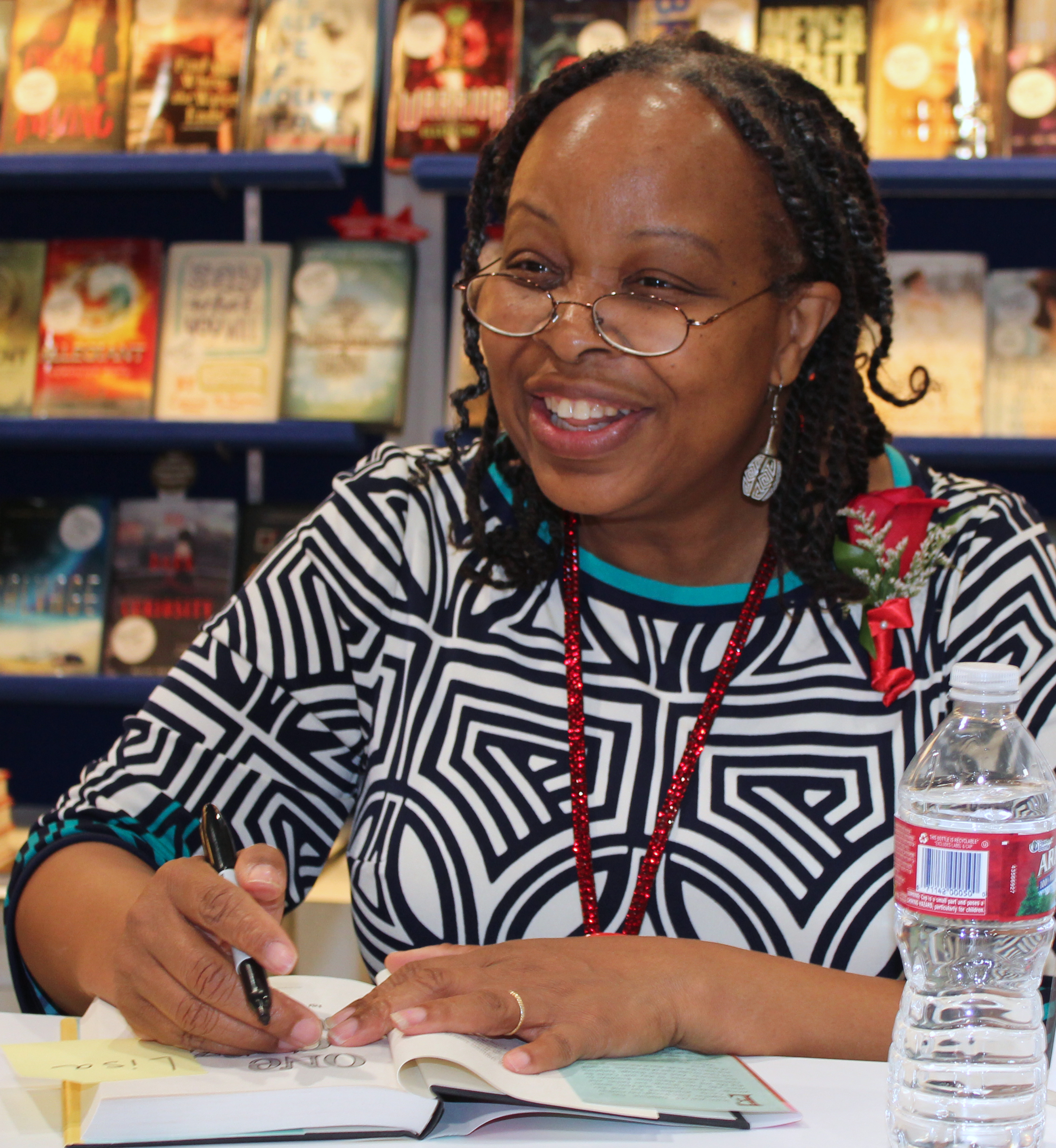
- Williams-Garcia in 2014
- Born: Rita Williams; April 13, 1957 (age 69); New York City, U.S.
- Education: Hofstra University
- Writing career
- Period: 1980–2016
- Website: www.ritawg.com

Rita Williams-Garcia (born Rita Williams; April 13, 1957) is an American writer of novels for children and young adults. In 2010, her young adult novel Jumped was a National Book Award finalist for Young People's Literature. She won the 2011 Newbery Honor Award, Coretta Scott King Award, and Scott O'Dell Award for Historical Fiction for her book One Crazy Summer. She won the PEN/Norma Klein Award. Her 2013 book, P.S. Be Eleven, was a Junior Literary Guild selection, a New York Times Editors Choice Book, and won the Coretta Scott King Award in 2014. In 2016 her book Gone Crazy in Alabama won the Coretta Scott King Award. In 2017, her book Clayton Byrd Goes Underground was a finalist for the National Book Award for young people's literature.

== Life ==
Williams-Garcia was born in Queens, New York. Her father was in the military. She graduated from Hofstra University in 1980, where she studied with Richard Price and Sonya Pilcer. She lives in Jamaica, New York. She taught for many years at Vermont College of Fine Arts.

== Works ==
- Blue Tights, Lodestar Books, 1988, ISBN 978-0-525-67234-0
- Fast Talk on a Slow Track, Dutton, 1991, ISBN 978-0-525-67334-7; reprint, Paw Prints, 2008, ISBN 978-1-4352-7952-0
- Like Sisters on the Homefront, Lodestar Books, 1995, ISBN 978-0-525-67465-8; reprint, Paw Prints, 2008, ISBN 978-1-4352-4403-0
- Every Time a Rainbow Dies. HarperCollins Publishers. 2001. ISBN 978-0-06-029202-7.; reprint, HarperCollins, 2002, ISBN 978-0-06-447303-3
- No Laughter Here. HarperCollins. 2004. ISBN 978-0-688-16247-4.; reprint HarperCollins, 2007, ISBN 978-0-06-440992-6
- Jumped. HarperCollins. 2009. ISBN 978-0-06-076091-5. "Rita Williams-Garcia."; reprint, HarperCollins, 2010, ISBN 978-0-06-076093-9
- One Crazy Summer. HarperCollins. 2010. ISBN 978-0-06-076088-5. "Rita Williams-Garcia."
- P.S. Be Eleven, 2013, ISBN 0061938629
- Gone Crazy in Alabama, 2015
- Bottle Cap Boys: Dancing on Royal Street, 2015
- Clayton Byrd Goes Underground, 2017
- A Sitting in St. James, published in May 2021 by Quill Tree Books, an imprint of HarperCollins Children's Books, ISBN 0062367293
