= Fabien Toulmé =

French comics writer

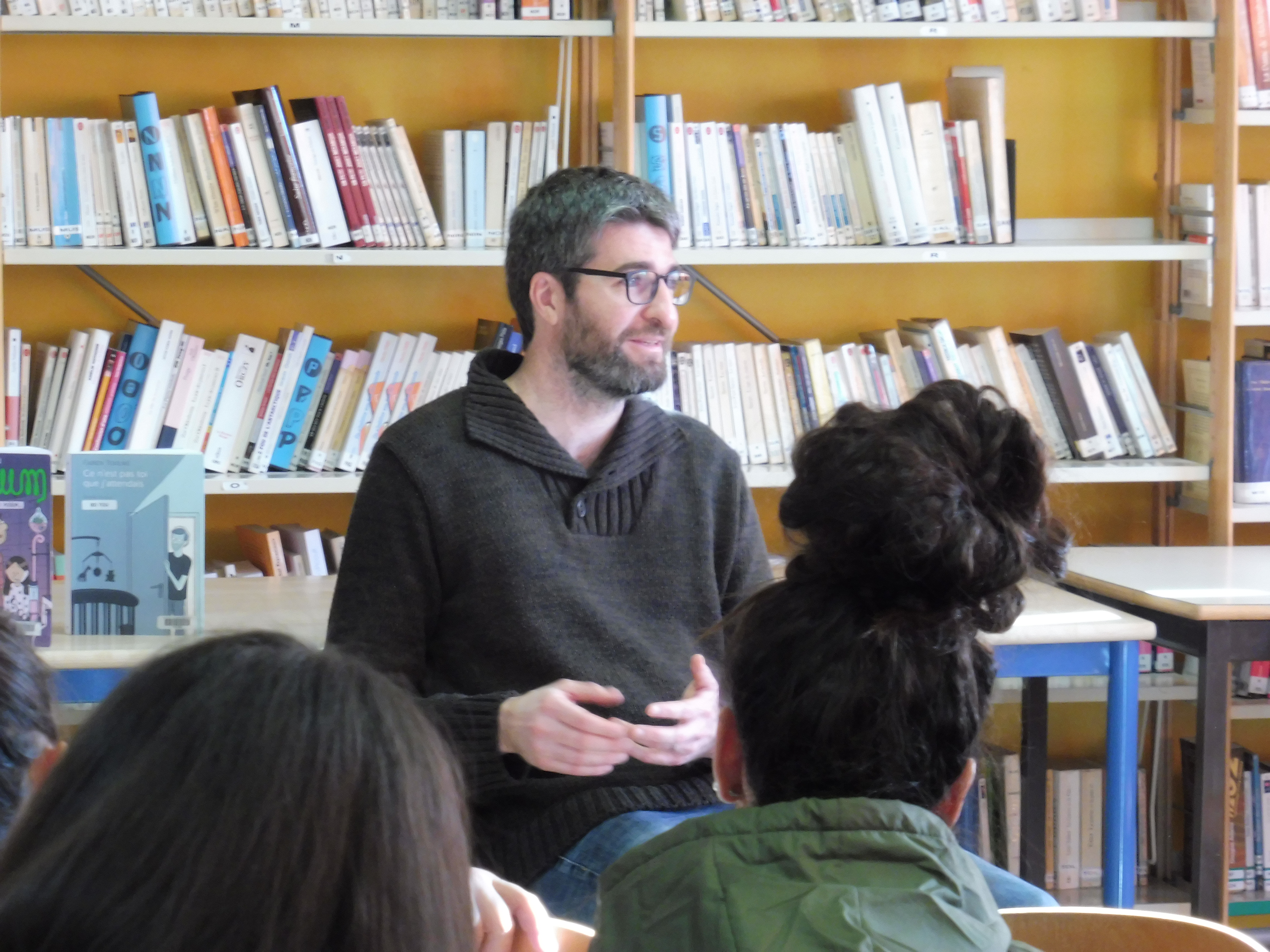
- Born: 1980 (age 45–46) Orléans
- Areas: Cartoonist, Writer
- Notable works: L'Odyssée d'Hakim
- Awards: France Info Prize

Fabien Toulmé (born 1980) is a French comic book author.

== Biography ==
Fabien Toulmé was born in Orléans. He studied civil engineering and urbanism. In his last year of studies in France, Fabien was able to do an interchange year, choosing the Federal University of Paraíba, in Brazil, and moved to João Pessoa. He opened an engineering firm in Fortaleza and worked as an engineer in Brazil, Benin, and the French overseas departments of French Guiana and Guadeloupe. He practiced this activity without any particular passion and during his stay in Brazil he met his wife, with whom he had two children. A few encounters in the world of Brazilian comics encouraged him to turn to this field. Back to France, he lived for a time in a Parisian suburb (banlieue).

From 2009, installed in Aix-en-Provence, he started publishing his work on the web and collaborated with magazines such as Lanfeust Mag (where he published a series called Heureux qui comme Alex), Spirou with L'Atelier Mastodonte, Psikopat and Wakou. He then joined Thomas Cadène on his webcomic entitled Les Autres Gens. He also participated in the development of collective works such as Vivre dessous and Alimentation Générale. Noticed by a collection director at Delcourt Editions in 2013, he worked as an engineer during the day and, in parallel, drew his first graphic novel during the evenings.

From 2014, his individual albums got published with Ce n'est pas toi que j'attendais (éditions Delcourt), an autobiographical comic book relating the impact on his life of the birth of his daughter Julia, who had Down's syndrome undetected during his partner's pregnancy. In 2017, Les Deux Vies de Baudouin was published, a graphic novel about a man who, discovering he has an incurable cancer, decides to make his dreams come true. The same year, Toulmé published Venenum. La grande histoire du poison, an educational comic book, as part of an exhibition in Lyon. Toulmé quit his job as an engineer and became a full-time comic book author.

In 2018, Delcourt published L'Odyssée d'Hakim (Hakim's Odyssey), a comic book series on the story of a Syrian refugee. Volume 1 was nominated for the Prix France Info 2019. Volume 3 won in 2021 the prix France Info for news and reportage comics and, in 2022, the Prix Inspireo des Lycéens.

== Works ==
- Ce n'est pas toi que j'attendais, 2014, édition Delcourt, coll. Encrages. ISBN 978-2-7560-3550-5
- Les Deux Vies de Baudouin, 2017, édition Delcourt, coll. Mirages. ISBN 978-2-7560-8225-7
- Venenum. La grande histoire du poison, 2017, édition Lyon BD. ISBN 978-2-9547148-9-9
- L'Odyssée d'Hakim, T1 : De la Syrie à la Turquie, 2018, édition Delcourt, coll. Encrages. ISBN 978-2-413-01126-2
  - English edition: Hakim's Odyssey: Book 1: From Syria to Turkey, 2021, translator Hanna Chute, Graphic Mundi - Psu Press, ISBN 978-1-63779-000-7
- L'Odyssée d'Hakim, T2 : De la Turquie à la Grèce, 2019, édition Delcourt, coll. Encrages. ISBN 978-2-413-01336-5
  - English edition: Hakim's Odyssey: Book 2: From Turkey to Greece, 2022, translator Hanna Chute, Graphic Mundi - Psu Press, ISBN 978-1-63779-008-3
- L'Odyssée d'Hakim, T3 : De la Macédoine à la France, 2020, édition Delcourt, coll. Encrages. (ISBN 978-2-413-02373-9)
  - English edition: Hakim's Odyssey: Book 3: From Macedonia to France, 2022, translator Hanna Chute, Graphic Mundi - Psu Press, ISBN 978-1-63779-031-1
- Cher dictateur (writing), art by Caloucalou, colors by Philippe Ory, Audie / Fluide Glacial, August 2019 ISBN 978-2-37878-223-8
- Suzette ou le grand amour (writing and art), Delcourt, coll. Mirages, June 2021 ISBN 978-2-413-03668-5
- Les reflets du monde: en lutte, Delcourt, coll. Encrages, June 2022 (ISBN 978-2-413-03899-3)
- Marilou (writer), art by Olivier Dutto, Delcourt:
  - La Magie de la campagne, 2022, colours by BenBK. ISBN 9782413044918.
  - Le Voleur d'amis, 2023, colours by Maëlys Cantreau. ISBN 9782413078289.
  - Mission sauvetage, 2025, colours by Maëlys Cantreau. ISBN 9782413086017.
- Inoubliables, Dupuis:
  - Volume 1, 2023. ISBN 9791034764570.
  - Volume 2, 2024. ISBN 9782808505086.
- Les Reflets du monde: Et travailler et vivre, Delcourt, collection Encrages, 2024. ISBN 9782413078272.
- Ulis, Delcourt, collection Mirages, 2025. ISBN 9782413088165.

== Awards ==
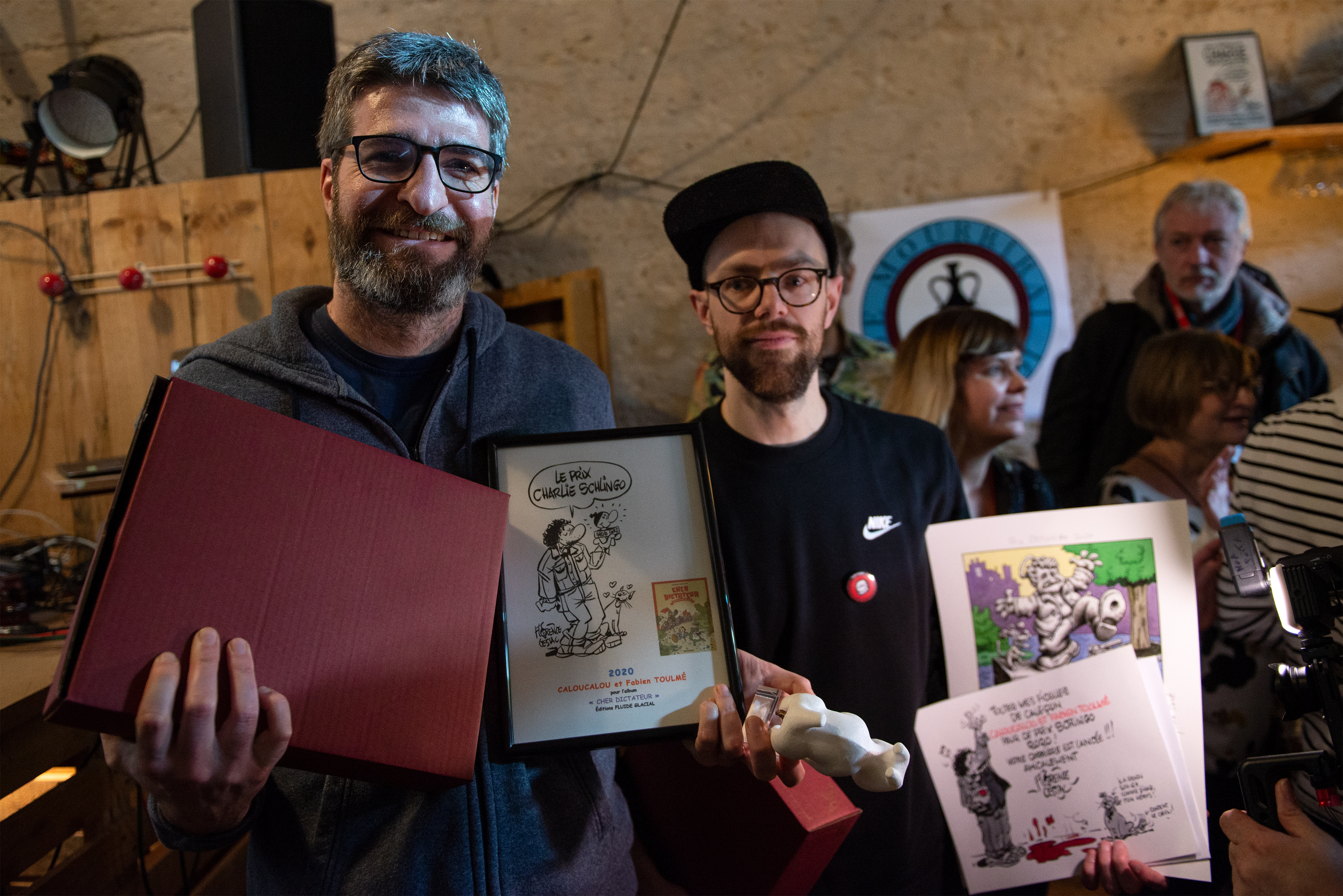
Fabien Toulmé (left) and Caloucalou (right) after being awarded the Schlingo Prize in 2020.

- 2018 : 2018 : Prix Région Centre - Val-de-Loire of the Festival bd BOUM for Hakim's Odyssey;
- 2020 : Schlingo prize, with Caloucalou, for Cher dictateur.
- 2021 :France Info Prize for news and reportage comics for Hakim's Odyssey, t.3 From Macedonia to France.
- 2022 Inspireo des Lycéens Prize for Hakim's Odyssey, t.3: From Macedonia to France
- 2026: Prix littéraire des lycéens des Pays de la Loire, comics category, for Ulis.
