= Francisco Jiménez (writer) =

Mexican American writer (born 1943)

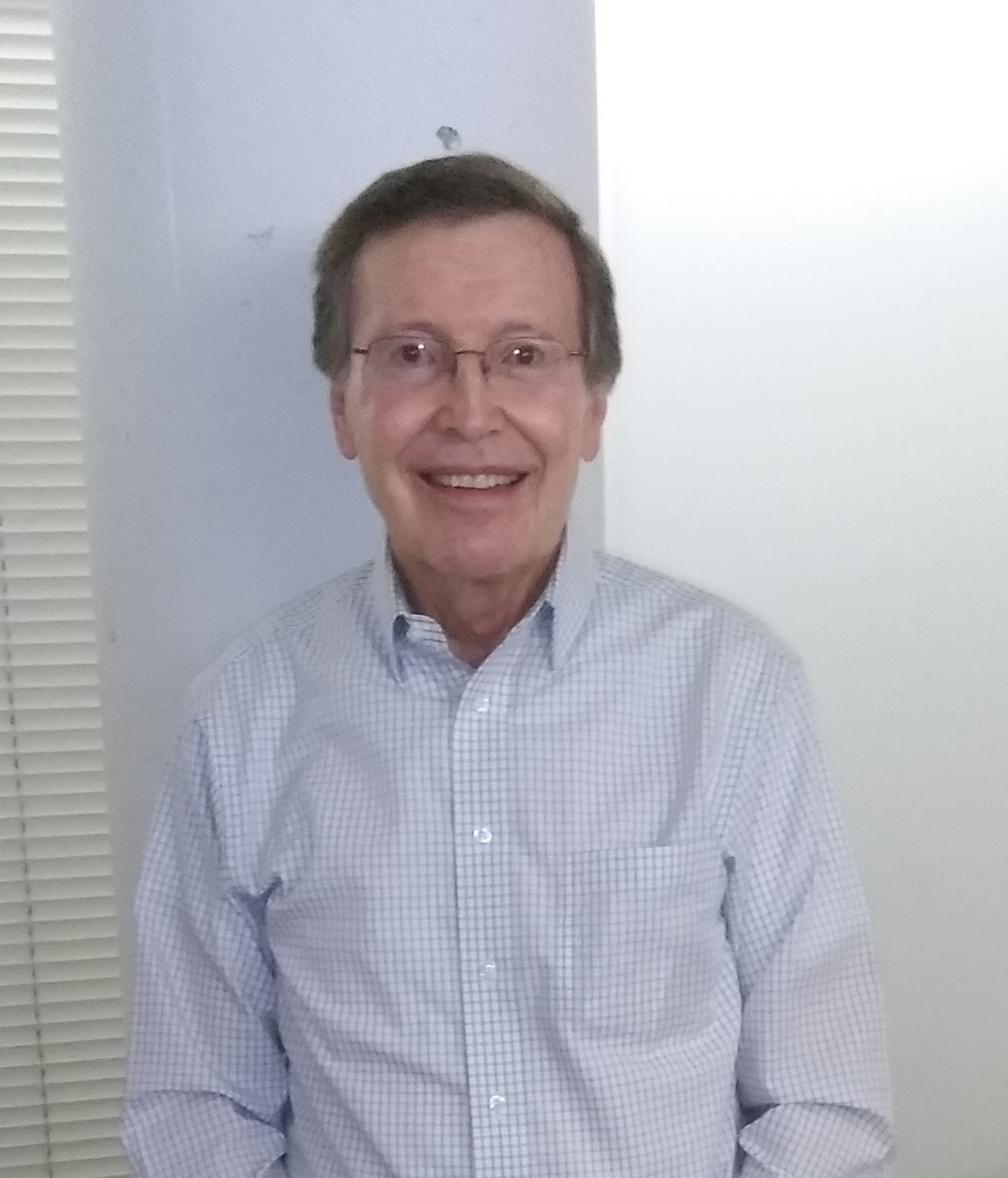
- Jiménez in 2018
- Born: June 29, 1943 (age 83); Tlaquepaque, Mexico
- Education: Santa Clara University (BA); Columbia University (PhD)
- Alma mater: Santa Clara University
- Occupations: Writer and academic
- Spouse: Laura Jiménez
- Family: Carlo Jiménez (grandson)

Francisco Jiménez (born June 29, 1943) is a Mexican American writer and professor at Santa Clara University in Santa Clara, California.

== Early life ==
Francisco Jiménez was born on June 29, 1943 in Tlaquepaque, the second oldest of six children. Up until he was four years old, he lived in a town in the state of Jalisco, Mexico called El Rancho Blanco. His family then immigrated to California to work as migrant farm workers. When he was six years old, he started working in the fields with his family. Growing up, his family would move frequently, following seasonal crops, causing him to miss months of school every year.

When Jiménez was in eighth grade, his family was deported back to Mexico. Several months later, they returned legally and settled down in a migrant labor camp in Santa Maria, California called Bonetti Ranch. His father could not work anymore because of severe back problems, so they would no longer move from place to place. Throughout high school, Jiménez and his older brother, Roberto, worked as janitors 35 hours a week each to support their family.

After high school, Jiménez received several scholarships and went on to attend Santa Clara University, getting his B.A. in Spanish Studies in 1966. He became a US Citizen during his junior year at Santa Clara. Then, he was awarded a Woodrow Wilson Fellowship to attend Columbia University where he received a Master's and Ph.D. in Latin American Literature.

At Santa Clara University, Jiménez met his to-be wife, Laura Facchini, and they got married while he was attending Columbia University. They have three children: Francisco Andrés, Miguel Antonio, and Tomás. Tomás Jiménez is (in 2019) full professor in sociology at Stanford University. Francisco Andrés is an accomplished artist and senior lecturer at Santa Clara University. Miguel, now retired, was a highly successful senior director of finance at Symantec.

== Career ==
Jiménez started his career as a professor teaching at Columbia University. He later accepted a position teaching in the Department of Modern Languages and Literature at Santa Clara University, where he worked full-time until 2015. He has received numerous awards for his teaching, including the Dia del Maestro Teacher of the Year Award from Santa Clara County, the David Logathetti Award for Teaching in Excellence from Santa Clara University, and the US Professor of the Year from CASE and the Carnegie Foundation.

Jiménez has held several administrative positions at Santa Clara University, including, Director of the Division of Arts and Humanities in the College of Arts and Sciences (1981–1990); Associate Vice President for Academic Affairs (1990-1994); Chair, Department of Modern Languages and Literatures (1997–2000) Director, Ethnic Studies (2001–2005)

He is the co-founder of The Bilingual Review, a scholarly journal dedicated to the study of the linguistics and literature of English Spanish bilingualism in the United States.

He has served on various professional boards and commissions, including the California Commission on Teacher Credentialing (10 years, two as chair), California Council for the Humanities (5 years, one as vice chair), Accrediting Commission for Senior Colleges and Universities (WASC, 6 years), Santa Clara University Board of Trustees (6 years), the Far West Lab for Educational Research and Development (5 years), ALearn, and the Leadership Board of the College of Arts and Sciences at SCU.

In 1997, Jiménez published his first autobiographical short novel, The Circuit: Stories from the Life of a Migrant Child (Cajas de Carton, Spanish edition). This book documents his early life, from crossing the border as a child to attending elementary school and working in the fields. There are three sequels to this book, which continue documenting his life through its next few stages. Breaking Through (Senderos Fronterizos, Spanish edition) is about his time in high school, Reaching Out (Más Allá de Mí, Spanish edition) is about his time attending Santa Clara University, and Taking Hold: From Migrant Childhood to Columbia University (Pasos firmes: Desde niñez migrante a la Universidad de Columbia, Spanish edition) documents his years in graduate school.

His four-book series—The Circuit, Breaking Through, Reaching Out, and Taking Hold—has been included in the American Library Association Booklist's 50 Best Young Adult Books of All Time.

Jiménez has also written some autobiographical picture books, including La Mariposa (1998) and The Christmas Gift/El regalo de Navidad (2000). In La Mariposa, Jiménez writes about the challenges of not speaking English during his year in first grade.

Some awards he has received for his writing include: the John Steinbeck Award, the Boston Globe-Horn Book Award, the California Library Association’s Annual John and Patricia Beatty Award, the Américas Book Award, the Pura Belpré Honor Book Award, the Parents' Choice Award, the Jane Addams Honor Book Award, the Tomás Rivera Book Award, Reading the World Award, the Carter G. Woodson Book Award and UCSB’s Luis Leal Award for Distinction in Chicano/Latino Literature.

== Selected works ==
- Senderos fronterizos (Mexico: Fondo de Cultura Económica, 2025)
- The Circuit Graphic Novel (HarperCollins, 2024)
- Cajas de Cartón (Mexico: Fondo de Cultura Económica, 2023)
- Pasos firmes: De niño migrante a la Universidad de Columbia (HarperCollins, 2022)
- The Circuit: Stories from the Life of a Migrant Child (1997)
- La Mariposa (Houghton Mifflin, 1998)
- The Christmas Gift/El regalo de navidad (Houghton Mifflin, 2000)
- Breaking Through (Houghton Mifflin, 2002) (sequel to Circuit)
- Reaching Out (Houghton Mifflin, 2008) (second sequel)
- Taking Hold: From Migrant Childhood to Columbia University (Houghton Mifflin, 2015)
- Stories Never to be Forgotten, English translation of Historias para tener presente. Arizona State University: The Bilingual Press, 2015.
- Cajas de Cartón y Senderos Fronterizos. Secretaria de Cultura, Gobierno del Estado de Jalisco, 2008.
- Cajas de Cartón: relatos de la vida peregina de un niño campesino. Boston: School Division, Houghton Mifflin Co., 2003.
- Más allá de mí. Houghton Mifflin Co., 2009.
- Senderos fronterizos, Trade Division, Houghton Mifflin, Co., 2002.
- Ethnic Community Builders: Mexican Americans in Search of Justice and Power (The Struggle for Citizenship Rights in San Jose, California. AltaMira Pres (co-authored with Alma Garcia & Richard Garcia), 2007
- Casse di cartone: Racconti dalla vita di un piccolo contadino emigrante. Italian Translation of The Circuit, published by Achille, 2007. Translation by Victor B. Vari and Nello Proia
- Under that Sky, Japanese translation of Breaking Through published by Tokyo: Komine Shoten Ltd., 2005.
- Cajas de Cartón. Comunicación y Lenguaje III. Guatemala: Editorial Kamar, S.A., 2005.
- The other side of the Road. Japanese Translation of The Circuit, published by Tokyo: Komine Shoten Ltd., 2004.
- Little Immigrant's Sky. Chinese Translation of The Circuit: Stories from the life of a migrant child, The Eastern Publishing Company Co., Ltd. 1999.
- Poverty and Social Justice: Critical Perspectives, Arizona State University: Bilingual Press, 1987.
- Hispanics in the United States: An Anthology of Creative Literature, Vol. II. Eastern Michigan University: The Bilingual Press, 1982.
- Mosaico de la vida: prosa chicana, cubana y puertorriqueña. New York: Harcourt Brace Jovanovich, 1981.
- Hispanics in the United States: An Anthology of Creative Literature, Vol I.Eastern Michigan University: The Bilingual Press, 1980.
- The Identification and Analysis of Chicano Literature. New York: The Bilingual Press, 1979.
- Los episodios nacionales de Victoriano Salado Alvarez. Prologue, Andrés Iduarte. Mexico: Editorial Diana, 1974.
