= Samantha Leriche-Gionet =

French-Canadian writer (born 1985)

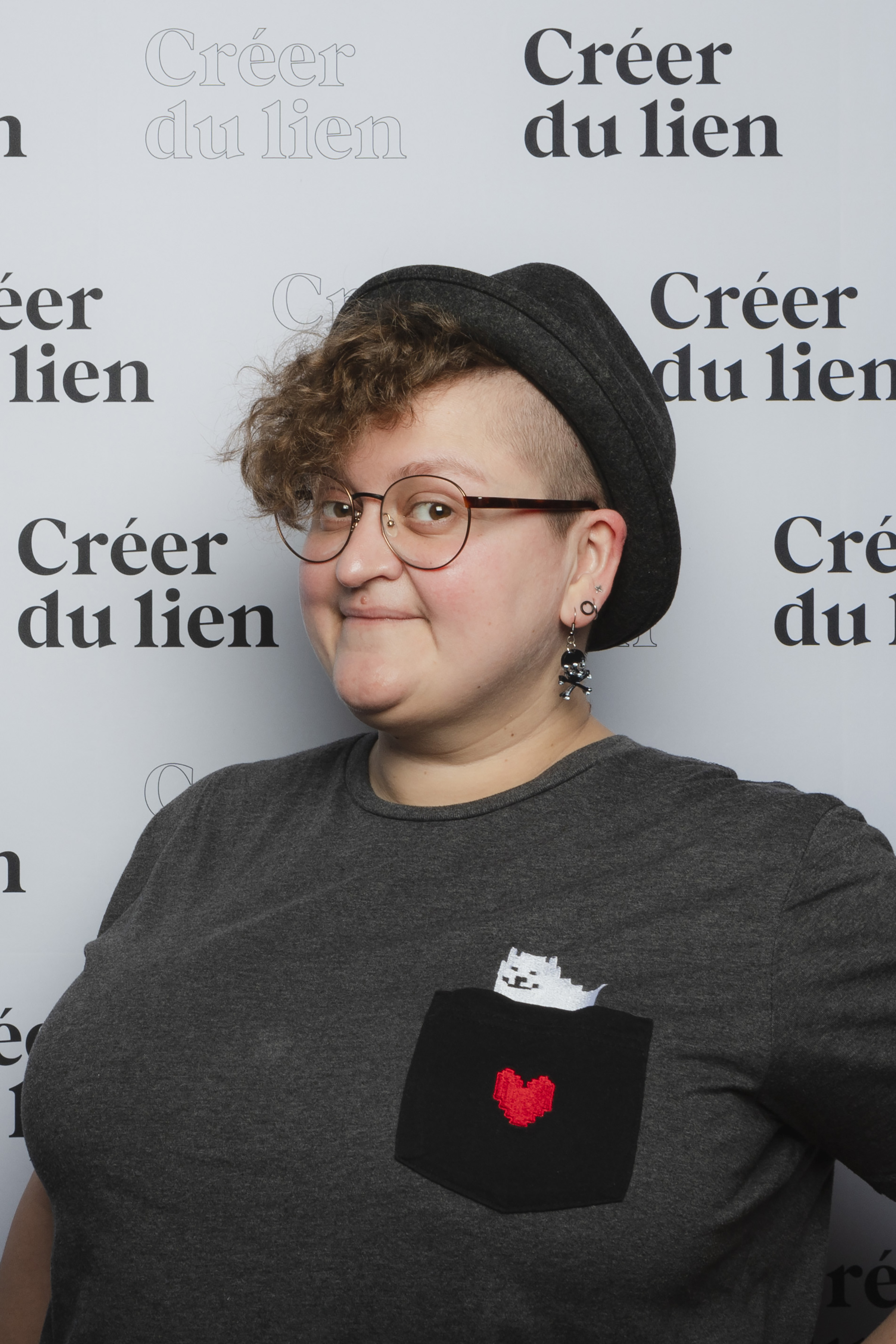
- Boum in 2022
- Born: March 8, 1985 (age 41); Montreal, Quebec, Canada
- Education: Cégep du Vieux Montréal; Concordia University
- Occupations: animator; illustrator; author; filmmaker
- Writing career
- Pen name: Boum
- Language: French
- Genre: comic strip
- Notable work: Boumeries
- Notable awards: 2011, Expozine prize; 2020, Bédélys Independent Francophone prize
- Website: boumfolio.com

Samantha Leriche-Gionet (born March 8, 1985), also known by the pseudonym Boum, is a French Canadian animator, illustrator, and comic strip author, as well as a filmmaker. She has always lived in the east end of the city of Montreal, Quebec. She has expressed her appreciation of the work of Marjane Satrapi, Ross Campbell, Tome and Janry, Zviane, Iris, and Francis Desharnais.

== Biography ==
Samantha Leriche-Gionet was born on March 8, 1985, in Montreal, Quebec. Leriche-Gionet studied animation, first at the Cégep du Vieux Montréal. In 2010, she graduated from Concordia University's Film Animation program, and in the following year, with David Barlow-Krelina, she competed at the Annecy International Animation Film Festival in the graduation film category.

From 2011, after participating in Hourly Comic Day, she developed a webcomic called Boumeries, published three times a week. This series presents "short autobiographical anecdotes of four panels". The volumes are self-published from 2011, and, in parallel, the author is a freelancer in animation and illustration. In 2011, the first volume was awarded the Expozine prize for alternative publishing in the "Francophone comic strip" category. In 2012, she was one of the finalists for the Prix Bédélys, in the category "Bédélys Independent Francophone". The ninth volume was nominated for the 2020 Doug Wright Award.

La Petite Révolution was published by Front Froid in 2012; the story centered on a character named Florence, an orphan, who goes through a revolution on the rhythms of Boris Vian. The book was short-listed for the Ignatz Awards in the Outstanding online comics category in 2016. In 2019, La Pastèque published Nausées matinales et autres petits bonheurs, in which the artist humorously evokes pregnancy. In 2020, Leriche-Gionet was the winner of the Bédélys Independent Francophone prize for volume 10 of Boumeries. In 2022, her graphic novel La méduse about the progressive but inevitable vision loss of a young woman is published. In 2024, The Jellyfish, La méduse's translation, is published.

== Personal life ==
Boum is married and has two daughters. Boum and her family live in Montreal. Afflicted with eye diseases for over a decade, she lost the use of her right eye since 2021.

== Awards and honours ==
- 2011, Expozine prize for alternative publishing in the “Francophone comic strip” category for Boumeries
- 2020, Bédélys Independent Francophone prize for volume 10 of Boumeries
- 2025, Eisner Award for Best U.S. Edition of International Material for The Jellyfish

== Selected works ==
- Boumeries (2011–)
- Culottes Courtes (2011)
- La petite revolution (2012); A Small Revolution (2017, English)
- Capitaine aime-ton-mou contre les ténèbres du suif (drawing and colors), script by Guylaine Guay, Éditions de la Bagnole, coll. "La bagnole tout-terrain", 2018 ISBN 978-2-89714-258-2
- Nausées matinales et autres petits bonheurs, La Pastèque, 2019 ISBN 978-2-89777-058-7
- La méduse, Pow Pow, Montréal, 2022, 228 p. ISBN 978-2-925114-17-8
- The Jellyfish [translation of La Méduse], Pow Pow, Montréal, 2024, 228 p. ISBN 978-2-925114-30-7

== Filmography ==
- Fou tu (2005)
- Lucien Superstar (2007)
- Le paquet/The Parcel (2008)
- Le grand saut/The Great Jump (2009)
- Snowflakes & Carrots (2010)
