= Trang Nguyen =

Vietnamese wildlife conservationist, environmental activist and writer

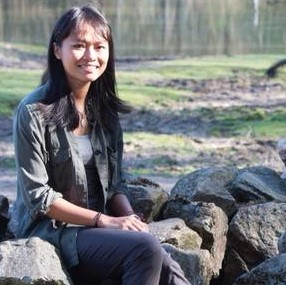
Trang at Burger Zoo, 2018

Trang Nguyen or Nguyên Thị Thu Trang (born March 2, 1990) is a Vietnamese wildlife conservationist, environmental activist and a writer. She is known for her conservation works in tackling the illegal wildlife trade in Africa and Asia. In Vietnam, she is known for her book Tro Ve Noi Hoang Da (Back to the Wilderness) and graphic novels Saving Sorya: Chang and the Sun Bear (Chang hoang da - Gau, lit. Chang is Wild about Bears) and Saving H'Non: Chang and the Elephant. In 2018, at the age of 28, she received an award from Future for Nature, as well as Eco-Warrior from Elle Style Awards. She was also voted as 30 under 30 by Forbes Vietnam and nominated for the Women of the Future - Southeast Asian region 2018 for her contribution in global wildlife conservation. She was also included in the BBC 100 Women list in 2019 and in Forbes Asia's 30 Under 30 in 2020.

In 2013, Trang was featured as a character on RuneScape to help raise awareness on rhino conservation. The game attracted over 3 million players within the first two weeks after release. In 2018, Trang participated in the South African documentary film, Stroop: Journey into the Rhino Horn War. and the US documentary Breaking Their Silence: Women on the Frontline of the Poaching War. In 2023, Trang was featured in BBC documentary series Planet Earth III while going undercover to prevent illegal ivory trade in Ivory Coast.
