= Graphic Novels & Comics Round Table =

Division of the American Library Association

The Graphic Novels & Comics Round Table (GN&CRT) is a division of the American Library Association, focusing on comics and graphic novels. It was officially recognized by the ALA in 2018.

== Leadership ==
As of 2026, Shauntee Burns-Simpson is the organization's president.

== Best Graphic Novels Lists ==
The GN&CRT runs two annual lists, the Best Graphic Novels for Adults list and the Best Graphic Novels for Children (aged 5-12) list. The Adults list was first released in 2020, while the Children's list launched in 2021.

== Outstanding Comics Awards ==
In 2024, the GN&CRT introduced the Outstanding Comics Awards, which honors the best graphic novels of the year. It is split into three audience groups, Children, Young Adults, and Adults, with each being further split into three categories: Fiction, Non-fiction, and Series. The first recipients of the awards were announced in January 2026.

== Grants ==
The GN&CRT offers an annual grant, The Will Eisner Graphic Novel Grants for Libraries, which had been given out since 2014. It was previously managed by ALA’s Gaming Round Table as well as the Graphic Novels & Comics Member Initiative Group.

== Collaboration with ALA affiliates ==
The Graphic Novels & Comics Round Table has collaborated with both affiliates and other divisions of the American Library Association to create "Collaboration Core List " of notable graphic novels relating to specific demographics. Specifically, it has worked with the Black Caucus of the American Library Association for the Black Lives Matter, Black Literature Matters lists, which currently consists of two Collaboration Core List and a series of mini-list themed to specific genres, REFORMA for a Latino-related Collaboration Core List, and the Rainbow Round Table for a LGBTQ-related Collaboration Core List.

== See also ==
- Great Graphic Novels for Teens by the Young Adult Library Services Association (YALSA), another division of the ALA
