= Eisner Award for Best Publication for Teens =

Annual American comic book award

- Awarded for: Best Publication for Teens
- Country: United States
- First award: 2008
- Most recent winner: This Place Kills Me by Mariko Tamaki and Nicole Goux
- Website: comic-con.org/awards/eisner-awards-current-info

The Eisner Award for Best Publication for Teens is an award for "creative achievement" in American comic books.

== History and name change ==
The award was launched in 2008 as Best Publication for Teens. In 2009 the name was changed to Best Publication for Teens/Tweens for one year. In 2012 the name of the award was changed to 2012: Best Publication for Young Adults (Ages 12–17). In 2013 the name of the award was changed to Best Publication for Teens (ages 13–17). In 2020 the name was changed to Best Publication for Teens.

== Winners and nominees ==
Eisner Award for Best Publication for Teens winners and nominees
Year	Author(s)	Title	Publisher	Ref.
2000s
2008	Nick Abadzis	Laika	First Second Books	
2008	Jacob Chabot	The Mighty Skullboy Army	Dark Horse Comics	
2008	Scott Chantler	The Annotated Northwest Passage	Oni Press	
2008	Manny Trembley and Eric A. Anderson	PX! Book One: A Girl and Her Panda	Shadowline/Image Comics	
2008	James Sturm and Rich Tommaso	Satchel Paige: Striking Out Jim Crow	Center for Cartoon Studies/Hyperion Books for Children	
2009	Neil Gaiman, adapted by P. Craig Russell	Coraline	HarperCollins Children’s Books	
2009	Chris Schweizer	Crogan’s Vengeance	Oni Press	
2009	Holly Black and Ted Naifeh	The Good Neighbors, Book 1: Kin	Scholastic Graphix	
2009	Shannon Hale & Dean Hale and Nathan Hale	Rapunzel’s Revenge	Bloomsbury Children’s Books	
2009	Mariko Tamaki and Jillian Tamaki	Skim	Groundwood Books	
2010s
2010	Evan Dorkin and Jill Thompson	Beasts of Burden	Dark Horse Comics	
2010	Troy Little	Angora Napkin	IDW Publishing	
2010	Eric Heuvel	A Family Secret	Farrar, Straus and Giroux/Anne Frank House	
2010	Kevin Cannon	Far Arden	Top Shelf Productions	
2010	Joe Kelly and Ken Niimura	I Kill Giants	Image Comics	
2011	Raina Telgemeier	Smile	Scholastic Graphix	
2011	Doug TenNapel	Ghostopolis	Scholastic Graphix	
2011	Barry Deutsch	Hereville: How Mirka Got Her Sword	Amulet Books	
2011	Jim McCann and Janet K. Lee	Return of the Dapper Men	Archaia Entertainment	
2011	G. Neri and Randy DuBurke	Yummy: the Last Days of a Southside Shorty	Lee & Low Books	
2012	Vera Brosgol	Anya's Ghost	First Second Books	
2012	Matt Phelan	Around the World	Candlewick Press	
2012	Gene Luen Yang and Thien Pham	Level Up	First Second Books	
2012	Paul Kupperberg, Fernando Ruiz, Pat Kennedy & Tim Kennedy, Norm Breyfogle, et al.	Life With Archie	Archie Comics	
2012	G. Willow Wilson and David López	Mystic	Marvel Comics	
2013	Madeleine L'Engle, adapted by Hope Larson	A Wrinkle in Time	Farrar, Straus and Giroux	
2013	Meredith Gran	Adventure Time: Marceline and the Scream Queens	KaBOOM!	
2013	Joseph Lambert	Annie Sullivan and the Trials of Helen Keller	Center for Cartoon Studies/Disney Hyperion	
2013	Ryan Inzana	Ichiro	Houghton Mifflin Harcourt	
2013	Josh Tierney, et al.	Spera, vol. 1	Archaia Entertainment	
2014	Paul Pope	Battling Boy	First Second Books	
2014	Matt Phelan	Bluffton: My Summers with Buster	Candlewick Press	
2014	Gene Luen Yang	Boxers and Saints	First Second Books	
2014	Sheila Keenan and Nathan Fox	Dogs of War	Scholastic Graphix	
2014	John Lewis, Andrew Aydin, and Nate Powell	March, Book One	Top Shelf Productions/IDW Publishing	
2014	Jordan Mechner, LeUyen Pham, and Alex Puviland	Templar	First Second Books	
2015	Shannon Watters, Grace Ellis, ND Stevenson, and Gus Allen	Lumberjanes	Boom! Box	
2015	Tony Sandoval	Doomboy	Magnetic Press	
2015	Jimmy Gownley	The Dumbest Idea Ever	Scholastic Graphix	
2015	Jeff Parker and Sandy Jarrell	Meteor Men	Oni Press	
2015	Gene Luen Yang and Sonny Liew	The Shadow Hero	First Second Books	
2015	Farel Dalrymple	The Wrenchies	First Second Books	
2016	Jillian Tamaki	SuperMutant Magic Academy	Drawn & Quarterly	
2016	Svetlana Chmakova	Awkward	Yen Press	
2016	Don Brown	Drowned City: Hurricane Katrina and New Orleans	Houghton Mifflin Harcourt	
2016	John Lewis, Andrew Aydin, and Nate Powell	March, Book Two		
2016	Max de Radiguès	Moose	Conundrum Press	
2016	Ben Towle	Oyster War	Oni Press	
2017	Ryan North and Erica Henderson	The Unbeatable Squirrel Girl	Marvel Comics	
2017	John Allison	Bad Machinery, vol. 5: The Case of the Fire Inside	Oni Press	
2017	Hope Larson and Rafael Albuquerque	Batgirl	DC Comics	
2017	Chip Zdarsky, Ryan North, Erica Henderson, and Derek Charm	Jughead	Archie Comics	
2017	Marjorie Liu and Sana Takeda	Monstress	Image Comics	
2017	Jessica Abel	Trish Trash: Roller Girl of Mars	Papercutz/Super Genius	
2018	Marjorie Liu and Sana Takeda	Monstress	Image Comics	
2018	Robert Kondo and Dice Tsutsumi	The Dam Keeper	First Second Books/Tonko House	
2018	Aline Brosh McKenna and Ramón K. Pérez	Jane	Archaia Entertainment	
2018	Fanny Britt and Isabelle Arsenault, translated by Christelle Morelli and Susan Ouriou	Louis Undercover	Groundwood Books/House of Anansi Press	
2018	Tillie Walden	Spinning	First Second Books	
2019	Jen Wang	The Prince and the Dressmaker	First Second Books	
2019	Hope Larson	All Summer Long	Farrar, Straus and Giroux	
2019	Erin Nations	Gumballs	Top Shelf Productions/IDW Publishing	
2019	Skottie Young and Jorge Corona	Middlewest	Image Comics	
2019	Cat Seaton and Kit Seaton	Norroway, Book 1: The Black Bull of Norroway	Image Comics	
2019	Tony Sandoval translated Lucas Marangon	Watersnakes	Magnetic Press/Lion Forge Comics	
2020s
2020	Mariko Tamaki and Rosemary Valero-O'Connell	Laura Dean Keeps Breaking Up with Me	First Second Books/Macmillan Publishers	
2020	Mariko Tamaki and Steve Pugh	Harley Quinn: Breaking Glass	DC Comics	
2020	Ebony Flowers	Hot Combs	Drawn & Quarterly	
2020	Colleen AF Venable and Ellen T. Crenshaw	Kiss Number 8	First Second Books/Macmillan Publishers	
2020	MK Reed, Greg Means, and Matt Wiegle	Penny Nichols	Top Shelf Productions	
2021	Gene Luen Yang	Dragon Hoops	First Second Books/Macmillan Publishers	
2021	Ngozi Ukazu	Check, Please! Book 2: Sticks & Scones	First Second Books/Macmillan Publishers	
2021	Kiku Hughes	Displacement	First Second Books/Macmillan Publishers	
2021	Joel Christian Gill	Fights: One Boy’s Triumph Over Violence	Oni Press	
2021	Sloane Leong	A Map to the Sun	First Second Books/Macmillan Publishers	
2021	Victoria Jamieson and Omar Mohamed	When Stars Are Scattered	Dial Books	
2022	Shing Yin Khor	The Legend of Auntie Po	Kokila/Penguin Random House	
2022	Marc Bernardin and Ariela Kristantina	Adora and the Distance	ComiXology	
2022	David Bowles and Raúl the Third	Clockwork Curandera, vol. 1: The Witch Owl Parliament	Tu Books/Lee & Low Books	
2022	Skottie Young and Humberto Ramos	Strange Academy	Marvel Comics	
2022	James Tynion IV and Michael Dialynas	Wynd	Boom! Box	
2023	Daniel Warren Johnson	Do a Powerbomb!	Image Comics	
2023	Jarrett Melendez and Danica Brine	Chef's Kiss	Oni Press	
2023	Alice Oseman	Heartstopper, Volume 4	Scholastic Graphix	
2023	Jamila Rowser and Robyn Smith	Wash Day Diaries	Chronicle Books	
2023	Tillie Walden	Clementine: Book One	Image Comics	
2024	Ryan North and Erica Henderson	Danger and Other Unknown Risks	Penguin Random House	
2024	Julio Anta and Jacoby Salcedo	Frontera	HarperAlley	
2024	Mamoru Aoi and Hana Allen	My Girlfriend's Child	Seven Seas	
2024	Lawrence Lindell	Blackward	Drawn & Quarterly	
2024	Sarah Meyer	Monstrous: A Transracial Adoption Story	First Second Books/Macmillan Publishers	
2024	Brenna Thummler	Lights	Oni Press	
2025	Gene Luen Yang and LeUyen Pham	Lunar New Year Love Story	First Second Books/Macmillan Publishers	
2025	Jonah Newman	Out of Left Field	Andrews McMeel Publishing	
2025	Lee Knox Ostertag	The Deep Dark	Scholastic Graphix	
2025	Adam de Souza	The Gulf	Tundra Books	
2025	David F. Walker and Marcus Kwame Anderson	Big Jim and the White Boy	Ten Speed Press	
2025	Jen Wang	Ash's Cabin	First Second Books/Macmillan Publishers	
2026	Mariko Tamaki, Nicole Goux	This Place Kills Me	Abrams Fanfare	
2026	Trung Le Nguyen	Angelica and the Bear Prince	Random House Graphic	
2026	Tillie Walden	Clementine: Book Three	Image Skybound	
2026	K. Wroten	Everyone Sux But You	Henry Holt Books for Young Reader	
2026	Keezy Young	Hello Sunshine	Little, Brown Ink	
2026	Simon Bournel-Bosson, translated by Edward Gauvin	Trumpets of Death	Graphic Universe/Lerner	
