= Secret Coders =

Series of graphic novels by Gene Luen Yang

- Author: Gene Luen Yang
- Illustrator: Mike Holmes
- Country: United States
- Language: English
- Publisher: First Second
- No. of books: 6

Secret Coders is a series of graphic novels that combines logic puzzles, basic programming instruction, and a story where a group of seventh graders uncover a secret coding school. The series is written by Gene Luen Yang, illustrated by Mike Holmes, and published by First Second Books.

== About the Author ==
American cartoonist Gene Luen Yang authored Secret Coders. He acquired a bachelor's degree in computer science at U.C. Berkeley. Some of his non-cartoonist jobs included a few years of software development and over 15 years of high school, teaching computer science in Oakland, California. His books are based on his teaching techniques, and meant to be educational, fun, and accessible to all age levels. He wrote the book to inspire people to learn coding. Yang wrote the book in a similar way to how he taught his classes. He has written many graphic novels including American Born Chinese, Dragon Hoops and Boxers & Saints. American Born Chinese also an upcoming TV series based on the original book.

== Structure ==
The Secret Coders series consists of six educational graphic novels. Each of the Secret Coders graphic novels has 3 chapters. The chapter “titles” are drawings of four-eyed binary birds, displaying the chapter number in binary with open and closed eyes. At the end of each chapter, there is a coding or binary challenge. At the end of each book, there is a coding challenge. The answer to the coding challenge is revealed at the beginning of the next book. The sixth and final book does not have a coding challenge at the end.

The beginning of the first book implies that the books are stories being told by the main character, Hopper. This is confirmed by the end of book six, where Hopper begins to tell the story to Eni.

All the books take place at Stately Academy

== Graphic novels ==
=== Secret Coders (2015) ===
This book is the first in the series and contains chapters 1–3.

In the first book, Hopper begins her first day at the strange Stately Academy. She meets Eni, who teaches about binary, teaching her how the robot birds around the school work. She also meets Josh, a kid who is perceived to be a bully by Hopper. Hopper meets an aggressive janitor named Mr. Bee, who she discovers he has more than meets the eye. She works with Eni to get into his office, and they find a robot turtle which is capable of learning basic speech commands. They both are caught by Mr. Bee, who uses the robot birds to attack them both, but they escape. Josh tries to apologize for his actions, but Hopper and Eni use the robot to trace a strange shape on the ground. It leads to an underground basement, but they are caught by Bee's birds and he gives them a challenge: if they can trace the path portal on the ground, they get to learn more about him. If not, they are expelled from the school.

Antagonist Dr. One Zero is shown briefly.

=== Paths & Portals (2016) ===
This book is the second in the series and contains chapters 4–6.

In the second book, the group passes

Programming concepts: random numbers

=== Secrets & Sequences (2017) ===
This book is the third in the series and contains chapters 7–9.

=== Robots & Repeats (2017) ===
This book is the fourth in the series and contains chapters 10–12.

=== Potions & Parameters (2018) ===
This book is the fifth in the series and contains chapters 13–15.

=== Monsters & Modules (2018) ===
This book is the sixth in the series.

== Main characters ==
=== Hopper ===
Hopper is a twelve year old girl and the protagonist of the Secret Coders series. She just moved to her new middle school, Stately Academy. She is in seventh grade. Her mom is the Mandarin teacher at Stately Academy. She began to play basketball after her dad, a huge basketball fan named Albert Gracie, disappeared. In the fifth book, Albert reappears and it is revealed that he was imprisoned by Doctor One-Zero and intoxicated with Green Pop. She becomes a coder after some lessons from Eni and Mr. Bee. Hopper is named after Grace Hopper. Her personality is also somewhat based on Grace Hopper (as with the name). Hopper is introduced to the reader in the first book.

=== Eni ===
Eni is a tall, African American basketball player. He has three older sisters, all basketball players. His personality and appearance were inspired by Chris Bosh, an NBA star and coder. He teaches Hopper binary and some basic coding. Eni is introduced to the reader in book 1. It is heavily implied that Eni is autistic.

=== Mr. Bee ===
Mr. Bee is the Stately Academy janitor with a secret past. He is based on Seymour Papert, a computer scientist. In the second book, it is revealed that he was the founder of the Bee School, a computer science school that was all but abolished. A few classrooms and plenty of turtles from the Bee School are hidden beneath Stately Academy. After Hopper, Eni, and Josh hear that Mr. Bee was once a professor at the Bee School, they refer to him as Professor Bee. In Potions & Parameters, it is revealed that he was originally named B Square, for he is from Flatland. He is introduced to the reader in the first book, but his past is not known until Paths & Portals, and his early past is not known until Potions & Parameters.

=== Dr. One-Zero ===
Dr. One-Zero's original name was Pascal Pasqual. He created Little Guy, and was a former student at the Bee School. He was the original creator of green pop, the substance that when drunk reprogrammed the drinker's brain to love the color green and only want to see the color green. Those that drink green pop can only say "Green!" (if they see the color green) and "Green?" (if they do not see the color green). He also made green mist—a vapor version of green pop—and ultraviolet mist, a vapor that makes a person want to see ultraviolet light (which causes eternal desire, because humans can not see ultraviolet light).

=== Other characters ===
Other characters include Josh, an award winningly fast typist, who, Starting in book two, uses the EdAll command to type up computer programs for Hopper and Eni. Little Guy is a robot officially called Pascal Junior after Dr. One-Zero or Pascal Pasqual, his original creator. Other turtles include Mini Guy, a tiny turtle; LightLight, the original Turtle of Light that Mr. Bee brought with him from Flatland; and BrightBright, the second Turtle of Light that the protagonists retrieve from Flatland. Minor antagonists include Principal Dean, the Stately Academy principal who works with Dr. One-Zero and the Stately Academy rugby team, who were bribed to do Principal Dean's bidding.

== Connections ==
=== Logo ===
Logo is the programming language used for the turtles throughout the Secret Coders books. Some of the commands include Forward (moving the turtle forward the given number of steps), Right and Left (turning right and left, respectively, the given number of degrees), PU/Pen Up (move without drawing), PD/Pen Up (draw while moving), and Repeat (repeat all the commands inside the brackets the given number of times). Logo is the first coding language the author learned.

Logo was designed as an educational way to learn how to use code. The general idea was that a student could move a turtle through puzzles by using the code. A lot of other coding languages like Scratch have based some ideas like "pen down" and "pen up" off of Logo.

=== Binary ===
Binary, or base two, is used frequently throughout the books. For example, the four-eyed-robot-birds' eyes close and open depending on what base ten number they see. They convert it to binary and open their eyes for 1s and close them for 0s. For example, the number 9 is written all over the school because when the birds see this number, they convert it to binary (1001) and close their middle two eyes, appearing normal.

=== Flatland ===
In the fifth and sixth books, it becomes clear that the full series is based on the book Flatland. In the fifth book, it is revealed that teacher–janitor Mr. B was named B Square when he lived in Flatland. B Square explains his life in Flatland, and mentions his brother, A Square, who came to Earth and wrote Flatland under another name. In the sixth book, the main characters Hopper, Eni, and Josh go to Flatland. Making the code to make a portal to Flatland is the challenge at the end of book five.
