= The Divine (graphic novel) =

2015 graphic novel

- Date: 2015
- Publisher: First Second Books, Dargaud

Creative team
- Writer: Boaz Lavie
- Artists: Asaf Hanuka, Tomer Hanuka

The Divine is a graphic novel published in 2015. It was illustrated by Asaf Hanuka and Tomer Hanuka, written by Boaz Lavie, and produced by Ron Propper. The Divine was a New York Times bestseller, a Hugo Award nominee, and the gold medal winner of the 9th International Manga Award.

== Story ==
The Divine tells the story of Mark, an explosives expert who, despite his better judgment, signs onto a freelance job with his old army friend, Jason. In Quanlom, a fictional Southeast Asian country, the pair are assisting the military when Mark is lured in by a group of child-soldiers, led by 9-year-old twins nicknamed "The Divine", who intend on forcing a showdown between ancient magic and modern technology. The Divine is very loosely inspired by the real story of twins Johnny and Luther Htoo, who jointly led the God's Army guerrilla group – a splinter group of Karen National Union – in Myanmar (Burma) during the late 1990s, and according to legends had magical powers.

== Reception ==
The Divine was released in French by Dargaud in January 2015 under the title Le Divin, and received critical praise. Frédéric Potet from Le Monde had labeled it "A combination of Bob Morane [a popular French adventure hero], David Lynch, and Katsuhiro Otomo (Akira)". Eric Libiot from L'express compared the coloring in the book (By Tomer Hanuka) to that of Hergé, creator of Tintin. Lysiane Ganousse from L'Est Républicain wrote: "The authors have turned a chilling true story into a stunning tale", and the popular comics critique website, 9emeArt, had given it a rating of 10 out 10, declaring that "Even though it's only January, we can already say it's going to be one of the best releases of the year".

The Divine was published in the U.S. by First Second Books, featuring a blurb by author Yann Martel, best known for the international bestseller Life of Pi. It was released in July 2015 and has hit the New York Times Best Sellers list. It has since received highly positive reviews. Publishers Weekly had chosen The Divine for "top ten graphic novel for spring 2015", describing it later on as: "Heady, hellacious, and phantasmagoric". Jesse Karp on his Booklist review wrote: "Stunning artwork and creeping dread weave together in this satisfying and moving page-turner". Douglas Wolk from The New York Times described it as "a too rare example of artists getting top billing", referring to the artwork by Asaf and Tomer Hanuka. Joshua Rivera from GQ wrote: "The Divine's story is unflinching and raw, and its art is quite possibly the most beautiful of any comic this year". Michael Mechanic from Mother Jones called it "beautifully rendered", while io9 defined it as "Your next comics obsession". Rich Barrett from Mental Floss chose it for "The most interesting comics of the week" and praised it for being "stunning, cohesive combination [of elements]". Terry Hong, from The Smithsonian Asian Pacific American Center blog, wrote: "can’t-turn-away riveting [...] Unrelenting and uninterruptible", and the Eisner nominated comics blog Comics & Cola dubbed it "superb" and chose it for its pick of the month.

The creators were featured in interviews on Entertainment Weekly, Juxtapoz, Paste, The A.V. Club and elsewhere.

The Divine was chosen as one of the best graphic novels of 2015 by GQ, The A.V. Club, Barnes & Noble, Bleeding Cool, Comics & Cola and others.

It was published in Italy by BAO Publishing, and was scheduled to be published in Germany in 2016 by Cross Cult.
