= Bottle George =

2024 Japanese animated short film

- Directed by: Daisuke Tsutsumi
- Written by: Daisuke Tsutsumi; Akihiro Nishino
- Produced by: Noriko Matsumoto
- Music by: Zach Johnston; Matteo Roberts
- Production companies: Chimney Town; Tonko House dwarf studios
- Release date: 2024
- Running time: 14 minutes
- Country: Japan

Bottle George is a 2024 Japanese stop motion animated short film about alcohol addiction. The 14-minute film explores the relationship between a young resilient girl and her alcoholic father, and was directed by Oscar-nominated director Daisuke Tsutsumi and co-written by Japanese comedian Akihiro Nishino and Japanese producer Noriko Matsumoto. After its premiere at the San Francisco International Film Festival in April 2024, the film has received several nominations and awards, including the Special Animation Award at the Sapporo International Short Film Festival and the Jury Award for Best Animated Short at the Newport Beach Film Festival. On December 17, 2024, The 21 was shortlisted for the 97th Academy Awards in the category of Best Animated Short Film.

== Plot ==
A strange creature stuck in a bottle of alcohol is captured by a little girl, who is the daughter to an alcoholic father. The creature tries to escape, but the girl and her cat seem to always get in the way of his freedom. Meanwhile, the little girl's drunken father greatly affects her. As he witnesses her pain, the creature starts to understands who he is, and why he is stuck in the bottle.

== Reception ==
Year	Award	Award/Category	Status	Ref
2024	Sapporo International Short Film Festival	Best Original Score	Won	
2024	Sapporo International Short Film Festival	Special Award (Animation)	Won	
2024	Newport Beach Film Festival	Jury Award for Best Animated Short	Won	
2024	Global Stage Hollywood Film Festival	Best Short 2024	Won	
2024	San Francisco International Film Festival	Official Competition	Nominated	
2024	New York Asian Film Festival	Official Competition	Nominated	
2024	Austin Film Festival	Best Animated Short	Nominated	
