= Ash's Cabin =

2024 graphic novel by Jen Wang

- Date: August 13, 2024
- Page count: 320 pages
- Publisher: First Second

Creative team
- Writer: Jen Wang
- Artist: Jen Wang
- ISBN: 9781250754059

Ash's Cabin is a 2024 graphic novel by Jen Wang, published by First Second. Its follows Ash, a non-binary teenager who runs away to live in their late grandfather's secret cabin. It received positive reception, including being nominated for the Eisner Award for Best Publication for Teens.

== Plot ==
Ash, a non-binary 15-year-old of Chinese and Irish descent, is frustrated by their family and peers due to their unwillingness to confront the climate crisis or fully accept Ash's transition. After the death of their beloved grandfather, Ash learns of a cabin he built in the wilderness while exploring the journals he left behind, and leaves there with their dog Chase with the intent of staying there. The book is told largely from the perspective of journal entries being written by Ash.

== Reception ==
Ash's Cabin received starred reviews from Kirkus Reviews, BookPage, School Library Journal, and Publishers Weekly. Kirkus Reviews praised the book for updating similar wilderness narratives such as Hatchet for modern readers, while BookPage and Publishers Weekly both highlighted the watercolor depictions of nature.

It was also reviewed by the Horn Book. The Beat noted the unique narrative framing, with much of the work relaying information through Ash's writing instead of speech or thought bubbles.

=== Accolades ===
Year	Award/Honor	Result	Ref.
2025	Eisner Award for Best Publication for Teens	Shortlisted	
2025	Harvey Award for Best Young Adult Book	Shortlisted	
2024	GLAAD Media Award for Outstanding Graphic Novel/Anthology	Shortlisted	
2024	Cybils Awards for Graphic Novel	Shortlisted	
2024	Kirkus Reviews Best Teen & YA Graphic Literature of 2024	Included	
