= Tomer Hanuka =

Israeli illustrator and cartoonist

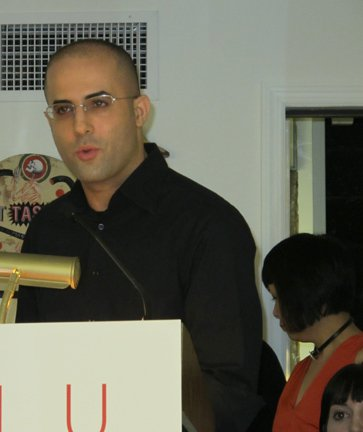
- Tomer Hanuka
- Born: תומר חנוכה; 1974 (age 51–52) Israel
- Areas: Cartoonist, Writer, Artist
- Notable works: The Divine; Overkill; The Placebo Man; Bipolar

Tomer Hanuka (Hebrew: תומר חנוכה; born 1974) is an Israeli illustrator and cartoonist.

== Biography ==
At age twenty-two, Hanuka moved to New York City. Following his graduation from the School of Visual Arts in 2000, he quickly became a regular contributor to many national magazines. His clients include Time Magazine, The New Yorker, Spin, The New York Times, Rolling Stone, MTV, and Saatchi & Saatchi. He is the winner of multiple medals from the Society of Illustrators and the Society of Publication Designers as well as American Illustration and Print magazine.

Together with his twin brother Asaf, Tomer co-created Bipolar, a 5-issue comic book series published by Alternative Comics in 2002–2003.

== Published books ==
=== The Divine, 2015 ===
The Divine is a graphic novel written by Boaz Lavie and illustrated by Tomer and his brother Asaf. Mark, an explosives expert who, despite his better judgment, signs onto a freelance job with his old army friend, Jason. In Quanlom, a fictional Southeast Asian country, the pair are assisting the military when Mark is lured in by a group of child-soldiers, led by nine-year-old twins nicknamed "The Divine," who are intent on forcing a showdown between ancient magic and modern technology. The Divine is very loosely inspired by the real story of twins Johnny and Luther Htoo, who jointly led the God's Army guerrilla group—a splinter group of Karen National Union—in Myanmar (Burma) during the late 1990s, and who according to legends had magical powers.

The Divine was released in French by Dargaud in January 2015 under the title Le Divin. It was published in the U.S. by First Second Books, featuring a blurb by author Yann Martel. It was released in July 2015 and has hit the New York Times Best Sellers list.

Coinciding with the book's release, the gallery exhibit The Art of The Divine opened at White Walls Gallery in San Francisco, showing sketches, rough page layouts, script pages, and prints of art from the book by Tomer Hanuka and Asaf Hanuka. The exhibit was curated by Chris Jalufka.

The Divine is to be published also in Italian, Spanish and German.

==== Reception ====
Frédéric Potet from Le Monde labeled it "A combination of Bob Morane [a popular French adventure hero], David Lynch, and Katsuhiro Otomo (Akira)". Eric Libiot from L'express compared the coloring in the book (By Tomer Hanuka) to that of Hergé, creator of Tintin. Lysiane Ganousse from L'Est Républicain wrote: "The authors have turned a chilling true story into a stunning tale", and the comics critique website, 9emeArt, gave it a rating of 10 out 10, declaring that "Even though it's only January, we can already say it's going to be one of the best releases of the year".

Publishers Weekly had chosen The Divine for "top ten graphic novel for spring 2015", describing it later on as: "Heady, hellacious, and phantasmagoric". Jesse Karp on his Booklist review wrote: "Stunning artwork and creeping dread weave together in this satisfying and moving page-turner". Michael Mechanic from Mother Jones called it "beautifully rendered", while io9 defined it as "Your next comics obsession". Rich Barrett from Mental Floss chose it for "The most interesting comics of the week" and praised it for being "stunning, cohesive combination [of elements]". Terry Hong, from The Smithsonian Asian Pacific American Center blog, wrote: "can’t-turn-away riveting [...] Unrelenting and uninterruptible", and the Eisner nominated comics blog Comics & Cola dubbed it "superb" and chose it for its pick of the month.

== Awards ==
Hanuka and Bipolar were nominated for a number of comics awards, including the Eisner, the Harvey, and the Ignatz. The Hanuka twins were nominated for a 2001 Ignatz for Promising New Talent. Tomer was nominated for a 2003 Eisner Award for Best Short Story for "Telekinetic," in Bipolar #3; and he was nominated for a 2004 Harvey Award for Best Cover Artist for his work on Bipolar. Bipolar was nominated for a 2005 Ignatz Award for Outstanding Series.
