= TVPaint Animation =

Animation software package by TVPaint Developpement

- Developer: TVPaint Developpement
- Release: 1991; 35 years ago
- Stable release: TVPaint Animation (12) / April 28, 2024; 2 years ago
- Written in: C++
- Operating system: Microsoft Windows, Mac OS X, Linux, Android, AmigaOS (from v1.0 to 3.59)
- Type: Raster graphics editor, animation and storyboarding software
- License: Proprietary
- Website: www.tvpaint.com

TVPaint Animation (also known as TVPaint, TVP, and before as Bauhaus Mirage or NewTek Aura) is a 2D paint and digital animation software package developed by TVPaint Developpement SARL based in Lorraine, France. Originally released for Amiga in 1991, version 3.0 (1994) introduced support for other platforms. In 1999, the last Amiga version 3.59 was released as free download. TVPaint Animation currently runs on Mac, Windows, Linux, and Android operating systems.

== Notable uses ==
=== Feature films ===
- My Dog Tulip, a 2009 American animated feature film by Paul Fierlinger and Sandra Fierlinger made with TVPaint Animation.
- Song of the Sea, a 2014 Irish Oscar-nominated animated feature film from Cartoon Saloon, directed by Tomm Moore.
- Mune: Guardian of the Moon, a 2015 French 3D computer-animated adventure fantasy film directed by Benoît Philippon and Alexandre Heboyan; 2D animated clips were made with TVPaint to coincide with the dominant computer-animation technique for the film.
- The Peanuts Movie, a 2015 American 3D computer-animated comedy film (with 2D animation sequences animated with TVPaint) produced by Blue Sky Studios.
- The Breadwinner, a 2017 Oscar-nominated animated film by Cartoon Saloon, directed by Nora Twomey and executive produced by Angelina Jolie.
- Kurt Cobain: Montage of Heck, a 2015 Emmy-nominated documentary directed by Brett Morgen with large animated sequences by a team led by Hisko Hulsing and animation by Stefan Nadelman.
- The Red Turtle, a 2016 Oscar-nominated animated feature film directed by Michael Dudok de Wit coproduced by numerous European studios and studio Ghibli, all the hand drawn animation was done in TVPaint.
- Ethel & Ernest, a 2016 animated feature directed by Roger Mainwood, based on the book by Raymond Briggs, produced by Lupus Films.
- Ernest & Celestine: A Trip to Gibberitia, 2022 sequel to the film Ernest et Célestine (2012), directed by Jean-Christophe Roger and Julien Chheng.
- Wolfwalkers, 2020 animated feature film from Cartoon Saloon, directed by Tomm Moore and Ross Stewart.
- My Father's Dragon, 2022 animated feature film from Cartoon Saloon, directed by Nora Twomey.
- Kensuke's Kingdom, 2023 British-Luxembourgian-French animated film by Lupus Films, directed by Neil Boyle and Kirk Hendry
- Inside Out 2, a 2024 American animated feature film produced by Pixar and directed by Kelsey Mann. Only two characters, Bloofy and Pouchey, were animated using TVPaint Animation.

=== Short films ===
- Adam and Dog, 2011 American Oscar-nominated animated short.
- How To Eat Your Apple, 2011 animated short film made with TVPaint Animation, by Erick Oh.
- Kung Fu Panda: Secrets of the Scroll, 2015 American animated short by DreamWorks Animation.
- We're Going On A Bear Hunt, 2016 British animated television special by Lupus Films.
- Late Afternoon, 2017 Irish Oscar-nominated animated short by Cartoon Saloon.
- Weekends, 2017 Oscar-nominated animated short film by Trevor Jimenez.
- Bird Karma, 2018 American animated short by DreamWorks Animation.
- Animal Behaviour, 2018 Oscar-nominated animated short film by Alison Snowden & David Fine, produced at the National Film Board of Canada. The film was a multiple-award winner at various film festivals.
- The Tiger Who Came To Tea, 2019 British animated television special by Lupus Films.
- Kitbull, 2019 American Oscar-nominated animated short produced by Pixar Animation Studios.
- Burrow, 2020 American Oscar-nominated animated short produced by Pixar Animation Studios.
- If Anything Happens I Love You, 2020 Oscar-winning animated short film by Michael Govier & Will McCormack.
- Opera, 2020 Oscar-nominated animated short film by Erick Oh.
- Mum Is Pouring Rain, 2021 French animated short film produced by Laïdak Films written by Hugo de Faucompret and Lison d'Andréa and directed by Hugo de Faucompret. The film won the Jury Prize in the Special TV category at the Annecy International Animated Film Festival the same year.
- The Boy, the Mole, the Fox and the Horse, a 2022 British Oscar-winning animated short directed by Peter Baynton and Charlie Mackesy (from the book by Mackesy).

=== TV and Web series ===
- Block 13, an Arabic animated television series.
- C'est Bon, a French animated series produced by Folimage
- Simon's Cat, a British animated web cartoon and book series by Simon Tofield. It was created using Adobe Flash, and TVPaint was used in the episodes Scaredy Cat, Snow Cat and in the Off to the vet special.
- Gigglebug, originally an iPad app made by Anima Boutique; a Finnish animated series, that first aired in April 2016
- PIG: The Dam Keeper Poems, a 2017 series based on the 2014 Oscar-nominated short The Dam Keeper directed by Erick Oh for Tonko House, which debuted on Hulu Japan on October 6, 2017
- Samurai Jack, Season 5 (2017) The fifth and final season of Samurai Jack, an American animated series, premiered on Adult Swim's Toonami, directed by Genndy Tartakovsky .
- Undone, animated series for Amazon Prime directed by Hisko Hulsing
- Primal, animated series created and directed by Genndy Tartakovsky for Adult Swim.
- Hazbin Hotel, animated series by Vivienne Medrano.
- Helluva Boss, spin-off of Hazbin Hotel, animated series by Vivienne Medrano.
- Unicorn: Warriors Eternal, animated series created and directed by Genndy Tartakovsky for Adult Swim.

== See also ==
- Flash animation
