= Lark Pien =

American cartoonist and architect

- Pien, photographed at the 2003 Museum of Comic and Cartoon Art (MoCCA) Art Fair
- Areas: Cartoonist, Colourist
- Notable works: Long Tail Kitty,Mr. Elephanter
- Awards: Friends of Lulu Kim Yale - Best New Talent award, 2004; Harvey Award, 2007

Lark Pien (born c. 1972) is an American cartoonist who has created the minicomics Stories from the Ward, Mr. Boombha, and Long Tail Kitty, the last of which won her the Friends of Lulu Kimberly Yale Award for Best New Talent in 2004.

Pien earned her Bachelor of Architecture in 1995 from California Polytechnic State University. She began making comics in 1997.

== Bibliography ==
=== Picture books ===
- Long Tail Kitty
- Long Tail Kitty, Come Out and Play
- Mr. Elephanter

=== Work as Colorist ===
Pien is the colorist for the following books:

- American Born Chinese (author: Gene Luen Yang, publisher: First Second Books)
- Boxers & Saints (author: Gene Luen Yang, publisher: First Second Books)
- Sunny Side Up (authors: Jennifer and Matthew Holm, publisher: Graphix/Scholastic)
- Dragon Hoops (author: Gene Luen Yang, publisher: First Second Books)
- Swing It, Sunny (authors: Jennifer and Matthew Holm, publisher: Graphix/Scholastic)
- Sunny Rolls the Dice (authors: Jennifer and Matthew Holm, publisher: Graphix/Scholastic)
- Sunny Makes a Splash (authors: Jennifer and Matthew Holm, publisher: Graphix/Scholastic)
- Turtle in Paradise (authors: Jennifer L. Holm and Savanna Ganucheau, publisher: Random House Graphic)
- Stargazing (author: Jen Wang, publisher: First Second Books)
- Diana: Princess of the Amazons (authors: Shannon and Dean Hale, publisher: DC)
- Avatar: The Last Airbender - The Lost Adventures and Team Avatar Tales Library Edition (author: Gene Yang, pub. Dark Horse Comics)

=== Anthologies ===
- Hello Kitty, Hello 40: a 40th Anniversary Tribute (pub VIZ Media)
- Mameshiba: We Could Be Heroes graphic novel (pub VIZ Media)
- Comics Squad #3: Detention! (pub Random House Books for Young Readers)
- "The Story of Binny" Flight Volume 4 (2007)
- "Game Daze" The Girls Guide to Guys' Stuff (2005)
- "Paragon" Scheherazade (2005)
- "Timshel" Blood Orange #4 (2004)
- "Demoniac Pacheco" Orchid (2002)

=== Minicomics ===
- Immortal Chicken: Change (2019)
- Immortal Chicken: Practice, Practice (2019)
- Immortal Chicken: Relax, Relax (2019)
- You Are, I Am - Magic (2009)
- Small Destructions (2008)
- Brave Mr. Elephanter (2007)
- Blomp!(2006)
- Long Tail Kitty - Graveyard Shift (2006)
- Accidental (2005)
- Long Tail Kitty - Full Moon Night (2004)
- Eat With Me, Long Tail Kitty cookbook (2003)
- Long Tail Kitty - Outer Space! (2002)
- Long Tail Kitty - XOXO (2002)
- Long Tail Kitty - Heaven (2001)
- Mr. Boombha Goes for a Walk (2001)
- Stories from the Ward, vols 1-4 (1997–2002)

=== Magazines ===
- Illustoria Magazine (ed Elizabeth Haidle, pub McSweeney's)
- Studygroup Magazine #4 (ed Zack Soto)
- Nickelodeon Magazine (ed Chris Duffy)
- Vision Quest comics gazette (ed Tim Goodyear)

=== Murals ===
- Sunstreet Breads in Minneapolis, MN
- Ronald McDonald House in Palo Alto, CA (with Butler Armsden Architects)

=== Web ===
- Long Tail Kitty on sundayhaha.com (2020- )
- Immortal Chicken on Popula.com (2018)

== Exhibitions ==
- 2015 - MOMENTUM: An Experiment in the Unexpected, "intervention" installation - San Jose Museum of Art, San Jose
- 2009 - I Love You a Little gallery show - Studio Gallery, San Francisco
- 2007/8 - I Am 10 exhibition - Cartoon Art Museum, San Francisco
- 2007 - Small Destructions installation - Cartoon Art Museum, San Francisco
- 2002 - She Draws Comics exhibition - Secession Gallery, Vienna
- 2001 - 355 Days installation - Atlas(t) at Galería de la Raza, San Francisco

== Awards ==
- 2004 — Friends of Lulu Kimberly Yale Award for Best New Talent
- 2007 — Harvey Award for color work on American Born Chinese (written and drawn by Gene Luen Yang, published by First Second Books, 2006)
- 2021 — Recipient of Koyama Provides microgrant
