= Boaz Lavie =

Israeli writer, filmmaker and game designer

- בועז לביא
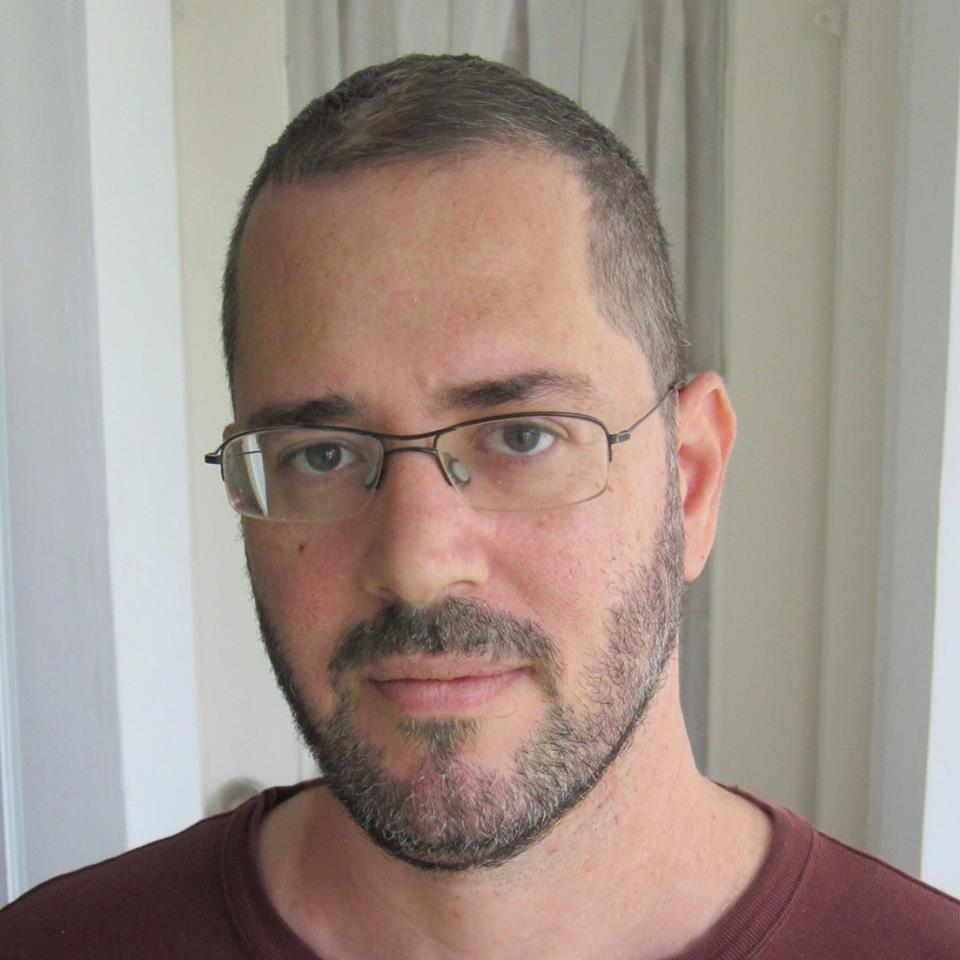
- Born: New York City
- Occupations: Writer, filmmaker, game designer

Boaz Lavie (Hebrew: בועז לביא) is an Israeli writer, filmmaker and game designer, notable for writing the New York Times best-selling graphic novel and Hugo Award nominee The Divine, a collaboration with the illustrators Asaf Hanuka and Tomer Hanuka. Lavie and the Hanuka brothers are the gold-medal winners of the 9th International Manga Award.

== Biography ==
Born in New York, Lavie moved with his Israeli parents back to Israel when he was three years old. During his mandatory army service he was a correspondent for the IDF weekly magazine, Bamahane, and editor in chief of its satirical section. Lavie took part in establishing the first commercial TV broadcaster in Israel, Keshet, working also as a screenplay writer for its local adaptation of Wheel of Fortune, the most viewed TV show in Israel during the 90's. Lavie was film critic and film section editor for Ynet, a major Israeli news website, and worked as a copywriter for yes, the Israeli satellite television provider. Since 2007 Lavie has been working mainly on his own creative projects, writing and directing the critically acclaimed short film The Lake, developing the virtual online board game Shobo, writing the graphic novel The Divine and publishing short fiction.

== Filmography ==
The Lake (Ha'agam in Hebrew) is a short film written and directed by Lavie in 2009. It is a dark and comic fantasy, exploring the complex relationship between two unemployed brothers (portrayed by Boaz Lavie himself and his young brother, Oren Lavie), out on a hunt for a mythical sea monster. The Lake was featured at dozens of film festivals, including at the San Francisco International Film Festival, Slamdance Film Festival, Palm Springs International Film Festival, and elsewhere. It was chosen by film critic Brian Darr as the "best film no one has heard of" for 2009, and was acquired for distribution by the Hamburg Short Film Agency (KFA Hamburg). The Lake was produced by Ron Propper.

== Games ==
Shobo is a virtual multiplayer board game, invented by Lavie in 2007 and originally developed by Roshumbo Games. In the game, two players place their five pentagonal pieces (called Daggers) on a hexagonal board, then try to eliminate their opponent's Daggers through a series of simultaneous moves. Shobo was launched on Facebook in 2010, was played by hundreds of thousands of users, and won the GameIS Award for best social game of the year. In 2015, Shobo was relaunched as a mobile game for iOS and Android, by Leotech Ltd., a Singaporean developer.

== Bibliography ==
Published in 2015, The Divine is a graphic novel written by Lavie and illustrated by the celebrated twin illustrators Asaf Hanuka and Tomer Hanuka. It was produced by Ron Propper. The Divine is the story of Mark, an explosives expert who, despite his better judgment, signs onto a freelance job with his old army friend, Jason. In Quanlom, a fictional Southeast Asian country, the pair are assisting the military when Mark is lured in by a group of child-soldiers, led by 9-year-old twins nicknamed "The Divine", who intent on forcing a showdown between ancient magic and modern technology. The Divine is very loosely inspired by the real story of twins Johnny and Luther Htoo, who jointly led the God's Army guerrilla group – a splinter group of Karen National Union – in Myanmar (Burma) during the late 1990s, and according to legends had magical powers.

The Divine was released in French by Dargaud in January 2015 under the title Le Divin, and received critical praise. Frédéric Potet from Le Monde had labeled it "A combination of Bob Morane [a popular French adventure hero], David Lynch, and Katsuhiro Otomo (Akira)". Eric Libiot from L'express compared the coloring in the book (By Tomer Hanuka) to that of Hergé, creator of Tintin. Lysiane Ganousse from L'Est Républicain wrote: "The authors have turned a chilling true story into a stunning tale", and the popular comics critique website, 9emeArt, had given it a rating of 10 out 10, declaring that "Even though it's only January, we can already say it's going to be one of the best releases of the year".

The Divine was published in the U.S. by First Second Books, featuring a blurb by author Yann Martel, best known for the international bestseller Life of Pi. It was released in July 2015 and has hit the New York Times Best Sellers list. It has since received highly positive reviews. Publishers Weekly had chosen The Divine for "top ten graphic novel for spring 2015", describing it later on as: "Heady, hellacious, and phantasmagoric". Jesse Karp on his Booklist review wrote: "Stunning artwork and creeping dread weave together in this satisfying and moving page-turner". Douglas Wolk from The New York Times described it as "a too rare example of artists getting top billing", referring to the artwork by Asaf and Tomer Hanuka. Joshua Rivera from GQ wrote: "The Divine's story is unflinching and raw, and its art is quite possibly the most beautiful of any comic this year". Michael Mechanic from Mother Jones called it "beautifully rendered", while io9 defined it as "Your next comics obsession". Rich Barrett from Mental Floss chose it for "The most interesting comics of the week" and praised it for being "stunning, cohesive combination [of elements]". Terry Hong, from The Smithsonian Asian Pacific American Center blog, wrote: "can’t-turn-away riveting [...] Unrelenting and uninterruptible", and the Eisner nominated comics blog Comics & Cola dubbed it "superb" and chose it for its pick of the month.

The creators were featured in interviews on Entertainment Weekly, Juxtapoz, Paste, The A.V. Club and elsewhere.

The Divine was chosen as one of the best graphic novels of 2015 by GQ, The A.V. Club, Barnes & Noble, Comics & Cola and others.

It was published in Italy by BAO Publishing, and was scheduled to be published in Germany in 2016 by Cross Cult.

In February 2016, The Divine has received the gold-medal of the 9th International Manga Award, in a ceremony in Tokyo, Japan.
