= Dragon Hoops =

2020 graphic novel by Gene Luen Yang

- Book cover
- Author: Gene Luen Yang
- Language: English
- Publisher: First Second
- Publication date: March 17, 2020
- Publication place: United States
- Pages: 448
- ISBN: 978-1-626-72079-4
- LC Class: 2018953556

Dragon Hoops is a nonfiction graphic novel by Gene Luen Yang, illustrated by Gene Luen Yang and Lark Pien, and published by March 17, 2020, by First Second.

== Plot ==
Gene Luen Yang says he was not interested in sports when he was a child. He was interested in comic books, and he created comic stories after graduation. In 2013, Yang publishes the graphic novel Boxers & Saints. His family celebrates the book, but Yang quickly starts running out of ideas for the next graphic novel. Yang is inspired by the basketball team at Bishop O'Dowd High School from Oakland, where he is a teacher. Yang discovers a basketball coach named Lou Ritchie, and they begin to discuss the sport. After Ritchie reveals his full name, Llewellyn Blackman Ritchie, Yang discovers a yearbook from when Ritchie was in high school. Flashbacks to Ritchie as a freshman in fall 1985 reveal that the varsity men's basketball team made it to the California State Championship. He wanted to join the basketball team by doing training and exercise skills. By the time of his junior year, he's grown tall and strong enough to play backup point guard. At the time, he and his team, are ready to start the game's championship. The Bishop O'Dowd Dragons are playing the Manual Arts Toilers for the trophy of California Interscholastic Federation. With seven seconds left in the final period, Dragons coach Mike Phelps yelled "get that ball inbounds! Don't let'em touch it! Then, whoever gets it, make something happen!" Ritchie takes the final shot, scoring two points at the buzzer, beating the Toilers in the final seconds. Just as the Dragons appear to have won the game, the referee calls off the basket, calling "No bucket! Offensive goaltending!" Phelps is irate that the Toilers have won the game with the last minute call. After Ritchie's graduation, he went to college to play a basketball team, first at UCLA, then at Clemson, before an injury ended his career. He graduated with a degree in history. In fall 2001, he returned to his high school, this time, he as a coach. He began as an assistant to Phelps, and then in 2012, he was promoted to head coach.

In the sub-plot, it tells the history of basketball as Yang looked at the resources in the library. He goes through tough times such as leaving Phelps out of the story, and choosing to leave Bishop O’Dowd High so he can write a comic on Superman. After Bishop O’Dowd won the championship, Yang chose to leave Bishop O’Dowd, and write for DC Comics although he decides to teach his kids basketball.

== Reception ==
Dragon Hoops received starred reviews from Publishers Weekly, School Library Journal, The Horn Book, Bulletin of the Center for Children's Books, and Booklist, as well as positive reviews from Kirkus, San Francisco Chronicle, and The New York Times.

Publishers Weekly complimented the book's writing: "Using a candid narrative and signature illustrations that effectively and dynamically bring the fast-paced games to life, Yang has crafted a triumphant, telescopic graphic memoir that explores the effects of legacy and the power of taking a single first step, no matter the outcome." The Horn Book's Eric Carpenter drew attention to how "Yang skillfully juggles the stories of multiple players and coaches as well as his own journey from basketball novice to avid fan."

Jesse Karp, writing for Booklist, applauded Yang's artwork: "Combining visual flair, like speeding backgrounds, with nearly diagrammatic movement, he creates pulse-pounding game sequences." Karp continued, noting, "Most important, through recurring visual motifs that connect a champion basketball player to a self-questioning artist to a Russian immigrant with a new idea, he illuminates the risks that every one of us must take and has, once again, produced a work of resounding humanity."

In varied reviews, the book was called a "standout showing," "[a] winner," and "emotional."

The New York Times, The Washington Post, Amazon, Forbes, School Library Journal, Booklist, The Horn Book, Bulletin of the Center for Children's Books, and Publishers Weekly included Dragon Hoops in "Best of" lists. School Library Journal included it several reading lists.

Awards and honors for Dragon Hoops
Year	Award/Honor	Result	Ref.
2020	Booklist Editors' Choice: Books for Youth	Selection	
2020	Booklist Top of the List for Youth Graphic Novel	Selection	
2021	Association for Library Service to Children Notable Children's Books for Older Readers	Selection	
2021	Michael Printz Award	Honor	
