= The Prince and the Dressmaker =

2018 fairytale graphic novel

- First edition cover
- Author: Jen Wang
- Language: English
- Genre: Fairy tale
- Set in: Paris
- Published: February 13, 2018
- Publisher: First Second Books
- Media type: Graphic novel
- Pages: 288
- Awards: Harvey Award (2018); Eisner Award (2019)
- ISBN: 978-1-62672-363-4

The Prince and the Dressmaker is a fairy tale graphic novel written and illustrated by Jen Wang and released in 2018 by First Second Books. Wang's second graphic novel, The Prince and the Dressmaker, tells the story of a Prince Sebastian, who dresses as the glamorous Lady Crystallia by night, and his seamstress Frances, who befriends the Prince and hopes to make her mark on the world of fashion.

The book has been well-received by critics who have compared it thematically to "Cinderella". The Prince and the Dressmaker won a Harvey Award and Eisner Award and its film rights were purchased in 2018, shortly after its publication.

== Plot ==
After creating a shocking dress for a young lady attending the 16th birthday party of Crown Prince Sebastian of Belgium, the young seamstress Frances is hired by a mysterious client. The client, who at first keeps their face covered, seeks to have Frances design them a variety of elaborate dresses. After Frances accidentally discovers the client to be Prince Sebastian, she agrees to keep his secret and begins designing dresses for him. The two attend a beauty pageant, which Sebastian wins with the first of Frances's dresses created for him. The judge asks the winner's name and is told it is Lady Crystallia.

Sebastian's father and mother, the king and queen, intend to set Sebastian up with a princess. He lunches with Princess Juliana, and after the date goes poorly, Lady Crystallia and Frances go out to a club. They meet Peter Trippley, who seeks to emulate Crystallia's fashions at his father's new department store, and considers hiring Frances. Tired from nights as Crystallia and days in engagements with princesses, Sebastian's parents send him on vacation. Frances and Crystallia encounter Juliana and her brother, but neither recognizes Crystallia as Sebastian. Crystallia meets with the designer Madame Aurelia, who offers Frances the possibility to work for her. Back in Paris, Frances and Sebastian go out to dinner and nearly kiss.

At a meeting with a princess, Sebastian insists he is not a good fit for her, at which point his father gets angry and collapses. Crystallia and Frances go out to the ballet to show Aurelia Frances's designs, but Crystallia insists that Frances cannot attend the meeting because Frances's status as Sebastian's seamstress is well-known and would give away Crystallia's secret. While Aurelia accepts Frances's designs for a fashion show at Trippley's, Frances is dejected and leaves Sebastian's employment. Sebastian plans to propose to Juliana.

Frances, again working as a low-level seamstress, is asked by Peter Trippley to design pared-down versions of her Crystallia outfits for Trippley's. Crystallia, alone, goes to a music hall and gets drunk, where she encounters Juliana's brother and passes out. Juliana's brother discovers Crystallia's identity and drags her in front of court, revealing her as Sebastian. Sebastian's parents and Juliana turn their backs on him, and he rushes away to a monastery in the mountains. Overhearing gossip of the happenings in court, Frances finds Sebastian's manservant Emile, who tells her that Sebastian left Crystallia's outfits to Frances. When she goes to retrieve them, she meets the king lying among the garments. He admits feeling as though he failed Sebastian; Frances replies that Sebastian was only afraid of what his parents would think.

At the Trippley's show, Sebastian appears backstage after being found by Emile. Frances, unhappy with the way Trippley limited her designs, makes a plan to showcase her more elaborate ones with Sebastian. On the way to dress, Sebastian encounters the king and queen, who reconcile with him and offer their help. Shocking the audience and presenters, Emile walks down the catwalk in one of Crystallia's outfits. Trippley's father demands that Crystallia be seized for ruining his show, but the King, also clad in an ornate dress of Crystallia's, intervenes on behalf of his child and walks the runway himself. Frances kisses Crystallia backstage.

Later, Sebastian is studying in Paris and Frances is apprenticing for Aurelia. Crystallia shows up beneath Frances's window; the two embrace and Frances offers Crystallia her new designs.

== Development ==
=== Writing ===
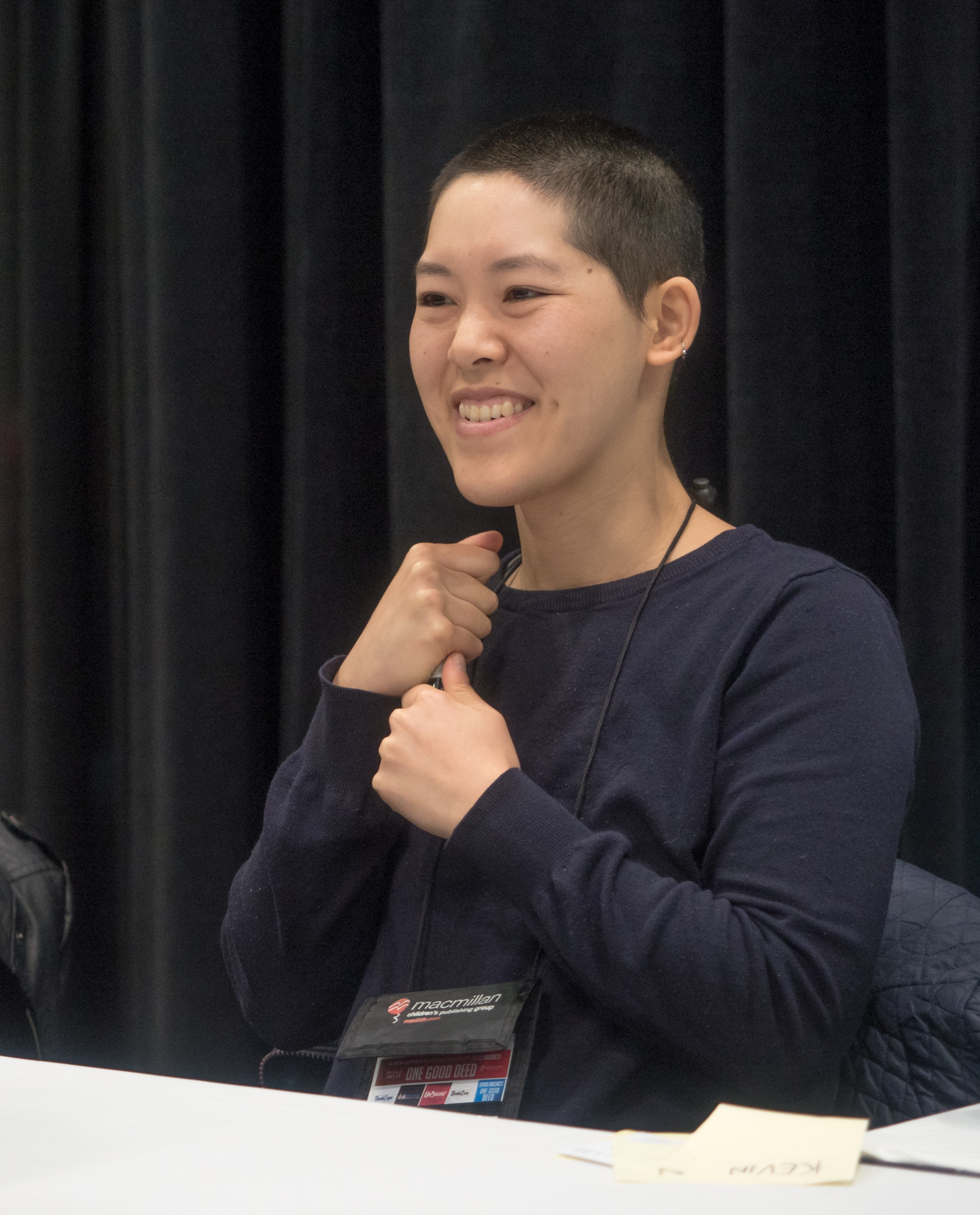
Jen Wang in 2019

The Prince and the Dressmaker was Jen Wang's second graphic novel after In Real Life, which she cowrote with Cory Doctorow. Her initial inspiration for the book came from overlapping interests in writing a contemporary Disney-style fairytale with developing a story about a superhero who could create clothes that transform those who wore them. Interested in stories about gender expression, Wang connected these interests while watching RuPaul's Drag Race after which point she said that "the whole story fell into place pretty quickly."

Wang wrote the character of Sebastian/Crystallia as "someone who identifies with different modes of gender expression and is comfortable alternating between both masculine and feminine", noting that she might call the character genderqueer but that other interpretations of the character's relationship to their gender presented by readers were also valid. Wang originally wrote both Frances and Sebastian as older characters, but adapted the characters to be teenagers which she realized heightened the stakes of the characters' realizations about themselves but otherwise fundamentally changed very little about the story.

=== Production ===
For the clothing illustrations in the book, Wang researched historical materials on Pinterest. Her intention with the outfits was not to mimic historically accurate fashions but for her designs to "feel fairytale-like and contemporary", for which her research provided her context. She drew the book's illustrations on Bristol paper with a mechanical pencil she had owned for six years and inked it with a Winsor & Newton size two Series 7 Kolinsky Sable brush and Winsor & Newton black india ink.

=== Publication ===
The Prince and the Dressmaker was published on February 13, 2018, by First Second Books at a length of 288 pages.

== Reception ==
Reviewers compared The Prince and the Dressmaker to the tale of "Cinderella", particularly the 1950 Disney film adaptation of the story. Mindy Rhiger, writing for The Comics Journal, described elements of transformation as being present in both stories, and noted that both begin with an invitation to a prince's ball. In the School Library Journal, J. Caleb Mozzacco described the story as a fairytale that rarely feels like one until its happily ever after ending which he described as "about as electric and triumphant a moment in a comic book that I can remember". J. Shapiro of the New York Public Library wrote that the book does not have any explicitly trans characters, but that the need for self-expression by Sebastian might be relatable to those who worry that the world would "shun who they are." Caitlin Chappell of CBR said that the graphic novel captured the romance, scale, and style of Disney films like Beauty and the Beast and Cinderella but had a "queer twist." She described Sebastian as moving between being a boy and girl, finding confidence in the identity of Crystallia, a femme identity, and identified the character as genderqueer.

=== Accolades ===
The book won the Eisner Award for Best Publication for Teens (ages 13–17) in 2019. It also won Best Children or Young Adult Book at the 2018 Harvey Awards, along with Kay O'Neill's The Tea Dragon Society.

== Adaptation ==
Film rights to The Prince and the Dressmaker were purchased in April 2018 by Universal Pictures and Marc Platt after what Deadline reported as a "competitive bidding situation". Kristen Anderson-Lopez, Robert Lopez, and Amy Herzog are attached to adapt the story into a movie musical.
