= Comic Arts Los Angeles =

Comic book festival in Los Angeles

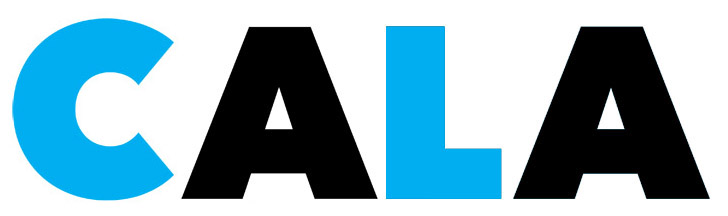
- Status: Active
- Genre: Alternative comics convention
- Frequency: Annual
- Venue: Homenetmen Ararat
- Locations: Glendale, Los Angeles, California
- Country: United States
- Inaugurated: December 6, 2014; 11 years ago
- Founder: Jen Wang; Angie Wang; Jake Mumm
- Most recent: December 13–14, 2025
- Website: http://www.comicartsla.com/

Comic Arts Los Angeles (abbreviated as CALA or Comic Arts LA) is a comic book festival held annually in Los Angeles, California. Inaugurated in 2014 at Think Tank Gallery, the festival showcases graphic novels, comic books, and zines created by independent artists and publishers. CALA includes an artist alley-style exhibition space that features roughly 100 vendors.

== History ==
CALA was inaugurated as a one-day event on December 6, 2014, at the Think Tank Gallery in Downtown Los Angeles, California. It is the first comic arts festival to be held in Los Angeles. Since 2015, CALA expanded from one to two days of programming, with the second day reserved for panel discussions. The event was put on hiatus due to the COVID-19 pandemic in 2020 and then returned in 2024.

=== Event history ===
Dates	Primary Venue	Featured Guest(s)
December 6, 2014	Think Tank Gallery; Los Angeles, California	Sam Alden, Mimi Pond
December 5–6, 2015	Think Tank Gallery; Los Angeles, California	Jaime Hernandez, ND Stevenson
December 3–4, 2016	Think Tank Gallery; Los Angeles, California	Sam Bosma, Matt Furie
December 9–10, 2017	Homenetmen Ararat; Los Angeles, California	Michael DeForge
December 8–9, 2018	Homenetmen Ararat; Los Angeles, California	Ronald Wimberly
December 7–8, 2019	Homenetmen Ararat; Los Angeles, California	Raúl the Third
December 14–15, 2024	Homenetmen Ararat; Los Angeles, California	
December 13–14, 2025	Homenetmen Ararat; Los Angeles, California	
December 12–13, 2026	Homenetmen Ararat; Los Angeles, California	
