= Oni: Thunder God's Tale =

2022 animated television series

- ONI ~ 神々山のおなり (Japanese: ONI: Kamigamiyama no Onari)
- Genre: Adventure; Drama; Fantasy
- Created by: Daisuke Tsutsumi
- Developed by: Daisuke Tsutsumi
- Written by: Mari Okada
- Starring: Craig Robinson; George Takei; Anna Akana; Momona Tamada; Brittany Ishibashi; Archie Yates; Tantoo Cardinal; Seth Carr; Miyuki Sawashiro; Charlet Chung; Yuki Matsuzaki; Robert Kondo; Omar Benson Miller
- Countries of origin: Japan; United States
- Original language: English
- No. of episodes: 4

Production
- Executive producers: Daisuke Tsutsumi; Robert Kondo; Kane Lee
- Producer: Sara K. Sampson
- Running time: 42–47 minutes
- Production companies: Tonko House; Netflix Animation Studios

Original release
- Network: Netflix
- Release: October 21, 2022

Oni: Thunder God's Tale (Japanese: ONI ~ 神々山のおなり, Hepburn: ONI: Kamigamiyama no Onari) is an animated fantasy television limited series created by Daisuke "Dice" Tsutsumi for Netflix. Based on "Onari's Lullaby" by Emi Tsutsumi, and inspired by various Japanese folklore, the series tells a story of Onari, who sets on a path of becoming one of the folklore heroes, protecting her peaceful village from the mysterious oni. Produced by Tonko House and animated by Megalis VFX and Dwarf Studios, the series premiered on October 21, 2022.

== Synopsis ==
Set in Japanese mythology. One of the free-spirited children, Onari, had a unique power yet to be seen by her peers in a world of oddball gods and monsters of the Japanese folklore. Aspiring to be one of the mightiest heroes of her village, she decided to take a journey to discover her own power. However, when a mysterious group of "Oni" threaten her own village, reputed for being peaceful for ages, she also had to rise to the occasion to thwart their attack and protect people of her village.

== Cast ==
- Momona Tamada as Onari
- Craig Robinson as Naridon
- George Takei as Mr. Tengu
- Anna Akana as Ann-Brella, Ninjin
- Brittany Ishibashi as Amaten
- Archie Yates as Kappa
- Tantoo Cardinal as Principal
- Seth Carr as Calvin
- Miyuki Sawashiro as Emi
- Charlet Chung as Darma, Tanukinta
- Yuki Matsuzaki as Tasaburo
- Robert Kondo as Nama & Hage, Kappa Papa
- Omar Benson Miller as Putaro

== Episodes ==
No.	Title	Directed by	Written by	Original release date
1	"Onari's Kushi Power"	Daisuke Tsutsumi and Erick Oh	Mari Okada	October 21, 2022
It is a brand new day at Mount Kamigami and the feisty Onari preps for the first day of school — where she will learn her powers for the challenges ahead.
2	"The Mighty Storm Gods"	Daisuke Tsutsumi and Hikari Toriumi	Mari Okada	October 21, 2022
With a newfound sense of purpose, Onari tells her classmates how she'll beat the Oni. Meanwhile, an unexpected guest arrives at Mount Kamigami.
3	"The Truth"	Daisuke Tsutsumi and Thad Carlile	Mari Okada	October 21, 2022
Lost in the Oni village, Onari musters the courage to search for clues about her Kushi power. Back on the mountain, the Kami prepare for the Demon Moon.
4	"The Demon Moon Rises"	Daisuke Tsutsumi and Michelle Lam	Mari Okada	October 21, 2022
When Naridon's secret comes out, Mount Kamigami falls into utter chaos. Hurt and hopeless, a crestfallen Onari finds an unlikely kindred spirit.

== Production ==
=== Conception ===
After spending several years of his career in the American animation industry, Daisuke "Dice" Tsutsumi began to wonder whether he would get a platform to tell another part of his identity. Dice then decided to start an animation project, dedicated on telling a story true to his cultural heritage. Hence, he began to conceptualize a story which were based on a Japanese mythology with a modern twist. With his project, he sought to shift the common perspective of onis and the notion of good and evil into a different angle. It was revealed later on October 20, 2022, that Tsutsumi had based the story on the poetry "Onari's Lullaby" written by his late mother, Emi Tsutsumi, who was a poet.

The environment of the series was largely inspired by Yakushima in the southern Japan, where Dice and Mari Okada often visit. Its forests, along with its vegetations, were made as the reference for the settings of Onari's neighborhood.

=== Development ===
On March 4, 2019, Tonko House, Daisuke Tsutsumi's own animation studio, unveiled the project, dubbed as Oni, as a part of the studio's project slates among other projects such as Leo and Sleepy Pines. The project was revealed to be a CGI animated and stop-motion hybrid television series, produced (and animated) by Tonko House with its animation developed by CG studio Megalis and Japanese stop-motion animation house Dwarf Animation, with the latter responsible for a Netflix animated series, Rilakkuma and Kaoru. The animated series was revealed to be created and directed by Tsutsumi himself. The test footage of Oni was revealed on the first Tonko House Film Festival in spring 2019.

On November 21, 2019, Netflix announced its collaboration with Tonko House, with Netflix joined the production board of Oni and picked up the series to release on the streaming platform. Along with the announcement, Daisuke Tsutsumi, Robert Kondo and Kane Lee of Tonko House were revealed as executive producers of the series with Sara K. Sampson serving as the sole producer.

On June 2, 2022, the television series was officially titled as Oni: Thunder God's Tale. It would be released as limited series consisting of four episodes with Mari Okada revealed as the main writer of the series ever since 2021. CG studios, Marza and Anima were revealed to have joined the animation development.

=== Casting ===
The casting of the limited series was revealed on June 2, 2022. Momona Tamada, Archie Yates, Craig Robinson, Tantoo Cardinal, Brittany Ishibashi, Omar Benson Miller, Anna Akana, Charlet Takahashi Chung, Miyuki Sawashiro, Yuki Matsuzaki, Seth Carr, Robert Kondo, and George Takei were revealed as part of the ensemble voice cast.

== Release ==
The series would set to launch globally on the streaming platform on October 21, 2022. A special screenings of the series on Animation Is Film Festival was set to premiere on October 22, 2022.

=== Marketing ===
The first teaser trailer of Oni: Thunder God's Tale was released on June 2, 2022, along with various visuals of the series. The series were also announced at Annecy Festival 2022 as part of Netflix's "work-in-progress" lineup. On September 25, 2022, the series were showcased as part of Netflix TUDUM Japan lineup with its release date announced on official channels.
