= The Cute Girl Network =

Cover art

The Cute Girl Network is a 2013 graphic novel written by Greg Means and M. K. Reed, with art by Joe Flood. It was published by First Second Books.

== Synopsis ==
When skateboard shop employee Jane becomes romantically interested in food cart operator Jack, she learns of the existence of the Network — an assembly of local single women who share information about the negative qualities of local single men, and who all recommend that she not pursue him.

== Reception ==
Publishers Weekly described The Cute Girl Network as "a fun, fresh take on romance with a fascinating subtext about gender relations", and extolled the "snappy dialogue" and the "refreshing and reassuring" message.

School Library Journal noted its "cartoon-like artwork" and "standard romantic comedy plot", and emphasized that it has "strong characters and emotional power", and is "minor" but "easy to love".

Comic Book Resources found the story to be "adorable", and commended Means and Reed for "mak[ing] the tired will-they-won't-they storyline feel surprisingly fresh and relevant" and "get[ting] so many of the little things right", but nonetheless faulted Jack as "almost unbelievably stupid", Jane as filling too many "super-cool skater chick cliches", and Jack's roommates as "carelessly rendered".

Paste considered it to be "warm, delightful, and occasionally surprising", and lauded Flood's portrayal of people for its "expressiveness", its "appealing simplicity", and its "nicely-varied cast, in terms of ethnicity [and] body type", but observed that when Flood illustrates backgrounds and environments, the level of detail "can be almost tiring": "a strange kind of excess, one that isn’t aiming to be showy, just kind of compulsively complete."

At BoingBoing, Cory Doctorow called it "hilarious and sweet (....) without being saccharine", and compared it to the work of Kyle Baker.

== Setting ==
Cute Girl Network is set in the fictional city of "Brookport", a deliberate hybrid of Brooklyn (M. K. Reed's home) and Portland (Greg Means' home).
