= Daisuke Tsutsumi =

Japanese animator and illustrator

- 堤 大介
- Born: Tokyo, Japan
- Other name: Dice Tsutsumi
- Education: School of Visual Arts
- Occupations: Animator, illustrator
- Employers: Blue Sky Studios (2000–2010); Pixar Animation Studios (2010–2014)
- Title: Co-founder and co-CEO of Tonko House (2014–present)
- Spouse: Mei Okuyama (m. 2009)
- Relatives: Hayao Miyazaki (uncle-in-law); Ryūhei Kawada (brother-in-law)

Daisuke Tsutsumi (堤 大介, Tsutsumi Daisuke) is a Japanese animator and illustrator. He is a former designer of Blue Sky Studios and Pixar, took within fourteen years before he co-founded an independent animation studio Tonko House with Robert Kondo. He co-directed The Dam Keeper with Kondo, which were nominated the Academy Award for Best Animated Short Film.

== Biography ==
Born and raised in Tokyo, Japan, he is married to Mei Okuyama (奥山 芽以, Okuyama Mei), a jewelry artist and the niece of acclaimed anime director Hayao Miyazaki.

== Filmography ==
- Ice Age (2002) (Matte Painting/Color Stylist Art)
- Robots (2005) (Lead Color Key Artist/Additional Design)
- Horton Hears a Who! (2008) (Lead Color Design)
- Toy Story 3 (2010) (Lighting Art Director)
- Cars 2 (2011) (Sushi Chef, Additional Voices)
- Cars 2: The Video Game (2011) (Sushi Chef)
- Monsters University (2013) (Color Art Director)
- The Dam Keeper (2014) (Co-director)
- Moom (2016) (Co-director)
- Oni: Thunder God's Tale (2022) (Creator/Showrunner)
- Bottle George (2024) (Director)

== Books ==
Dice has appeared in both volumes of Blue Sky Studios Out of Picture anthology, contributing the stories "Noche Y Dia" in Volume 1 and "The Dream of Kyosuke" in Volume 2.

The Dam Keeper has been developed volume graphic novel published by First Second Books:

- The Dam Keeper (2017)
- The Dam Keeper: World Without Darkness (2018)
- The Dam Keeper: Return from the Shadows (2019)

== Special projects ==
In 2008, Dice (along with Ronnie del Carmen. Enrico Casarosa and Yukino Pang) initiated the Totoro Forest Project, a fundraising exhibition/auction to support the non-profit Totoro Forest Foundation. This initiative also produced a corresponding art book reprinting the various pieces contributed and included the likes of James Jean, Charles Vess, Iain McCaig and William Joyce among others.

He is also overseeing Sketchtravel (with Gerald Guerlais) which purpose is passing a real sketchbook "from one artist's hand to another like an Olympic torch in an artistic relay through 12 countries over 4 and half years", and the end result auctioned off to benefit the various chosen charities that the participating artists choose.
