= The Dam Keeper =

2014 American animated short film

- Film poster
- Directed by: Robert Kondo; Daisuke Tsutsumi
- Written by: Robert Kondo; Daisuke Tsutsumi
- Produced by: Megan Bartel; Duncan Ramsay
- Narrated by: Lars Mikkelsen
- Edited by: Bradley Furnish
- Music by: Zach Johnston; Matteo Roberts
- Production company: Tonko House LLC
- Release dates: February 11, 2014 (Berlin); March 2014 (NY)
- Running time: 18 minutes
- Country: United States
- Language: English

The Dam Keeper is a 2014 American animated short film directed by Robert Kondo and Daisuke Tsutsumi. It tells the story of Pig, an introverted youth who lives in a windmill and keeps a dark fog from engulfing his town. Although socially rejected by his peers, he is befriended by the artistic Fox.

Kondo and Tsutsumi began developing the film while working as art directors on Monsters University and produced it through a co-op program at Pixar. This is Tsutsumi's second short film, after 2011's Sketchtravel, and Kondo's first directorial effort. Producers Megan Bartel and Duncan Ramsay were also employees at Pixar. The film received an Academy Award nomination for Best Animated Short Film.

== Plot ==
Pig lives alone in a windmill on the outskirts of town. The windmill sits atop a massive wall and continually blows away a dark fog that perpetually looms outside the wall. Every day, Pig winds the windmill to keep it turning, just like his father before him.

However, in town and at school, nobody likes Pig. Even though he protects the town, the other animal children make fun of him and bully him.

Soon, a new student, Fox, arrives at the school carrying a sketchbook and quickly becomes rather popular. One day, she mistakenly drops the sketchbook while leaving the classroom, and Pig discovers that Fox draws mocking caricatures of classmates and teachers. Fox shows up the next day upset about losing the sketchbook, but she is quickly relieved to see that Pig has it with him.

That day at school, bullies drag Pig into the restroom and harass him. Fox discovers Pig in the restroom, and consoles him and teaches him to use art as an emotional outlet for his daily hardships. The two become good friends. After school one day, Pig notices Fox surrounded by several other students looking at one of her drawings and laughing. Emboldened, Pig approaches the group. Through the crowd, Pig barely sees a mean-looking caricature of himself, with "Dirty P-" written at the top. Devastated, Pig rips the drawing out of Fox's sketchbook and runs away in tears.

As evening continues, the fog draws near - Pig should be returning to his home to wind the windmill. Instead, sitting in sorrow, he puts on his gas mask and waits as the fog envelops the town while the other animals flee in terror. Eventually, Pig looks down at the drawing and discovers that he is not the only one caricatured—Fox is next to him, and the title is actually "Dirty Pals". Jolted back to his senses, Pig realizes what horrible risk the town is in. He makes his way to the windmill and manages to rid the town of the fog, losing and damaging one of the mill's propellers in the process.

Pig gazes out the window of the windmill as the fog clears and the citizens begin cleaning up. Pig remembers the drawing and begins to leave. Upon opening the door, Fox is waiting for him. Pig acknowledges his misunderstanding, and she extends forgiveness to him. The two then play together inside the windmill.

== Cast ==
- Lars Mikkelsen as Narrator

== Production ==
=== Development ===
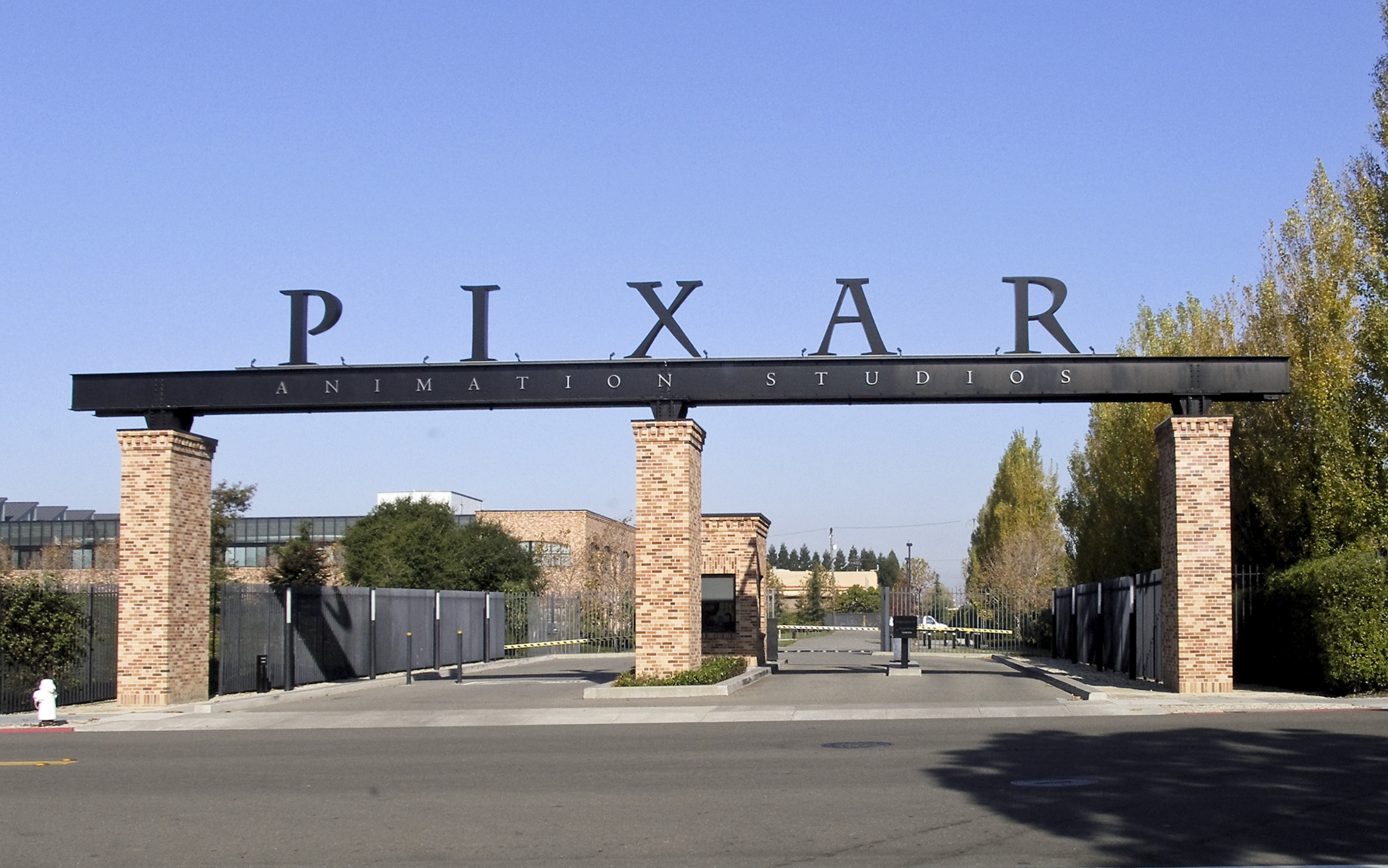
Directors Robert Kondo and Daisuke "Dice" Tsutsumi developed The Dam Keeper under a co-op program at Pixar.

The Dam Keeper was produced as part of a co-op program at Pixar, under which employees are allowed to develop their own films without the use of studio resources. Directors Robert Kondo and Daisuke "Dice" Tsutsumi were both art directors at Pixar. They had worked together on Toy Story 3 and Monsters University. Partially facilitated by having their offices located next to one another's, a friendship quickly formed between the two of them. While Kondo's first job was at Pixar, Tsutsumi had previously been employed at Blue Sky Studios and is married to a niece of famed Japanese animator Hayao Miyazaki. Kondo recalls having been "fascinated by [Tsutsumi's] outside experience" and recognized at the time that his co-worker's "vision always seemed to be greater than the box [of] our responsibility." In 2011, Tsutsumi released his first directorial effort - an animated short film called Sketchtravel. He was aided on the film by Kondo, who worked on it as an animator. Kondo has described the film as having "very limited animation...like a children's book come to life."

Shortly after the completion of Sketchtravel, Tsutsumi turned to Kondo with the idea of collaborating on a new short film. This was during the "heat of production" for Monsters University, a time after which, as Kondo explained, most animators normally consider taking time off. Kondo noted, "Dice wanted to take time off, but in that time, he wanted to make a film." The two were tantalized by the potential, recognizing how much Tsutsumi had been able to achieve as a solo-director, and considering how much more they would be able to achieve together. For the following year, they developed story ideas before and after work, sharing treatments with each other through Google Docs. Unable to use their Pixar offices for the task, they wrote in their home studios, cafes - anywhere that "encouraged [their] creativity" and had internet access. They then got together on weekends to discuss story ideas.

=== Pre-production ===
Once their duties on Monsters University were complete, Kondo and Tsutsumi took a three-month sabbatical to begin production on their project. They began without any clear intentions - the film would simply be an experiment to see "how far [they] could go". The two co-directors rented a windowless studio right across the street from Pixar. At first, they were unsure of how to approach production. "There was no real formula or no real path as to what was right", Kondo said. "We didn't know - should we be writing a script, should we be drawing moments, should we be talking about character design?" Not until their editor, Bradley Furnish, became involved, did all of the individual elements synthesize into what the directors recognized as a potential film.

The two directors refused to pressure themselves into striving for perfection; they just wanted to get the film done. Recognizing the process as a "learning experience", and choosing to extend this opportunity to the rest of the crew, they hired animators who were predominantly young and had just graduated from school. "Growth was a big part of...who we selected to bring on", Kondo said. "We kept asking, what can you gain by working on this project?" Rounding out the crew were fellow Pixar employees, such as Duncan Ramsay, who worked as a production assistant at the studio. Ramsay's co-workers gave him the chance to come onto The Dam Keeper in an even more distinguished position than production assistant - producer. However, Ramsay feared that balancing a project like this, on the side of his regular Pixar duties, would prove an unmanageable workload. So initially, he turned the offer down. All the same, he found himself gradually being drawn into the project, and once he committed full-scale, he convinced his friend, Megan Bartel, to come onto the film as a producer with him. Bartel characterized Ramsay as "the perfect strategist"; someone who holds an ideal mixture of warmth and intelligence. Ramsay would hold "daily progress check-ins" throughout the film's production and found a "creative outlet" in writing the film's narration. The crew in its entirety consisted of about seventy people, though there was a "core group" of about twenty to twenty-five. Everyone worked on a volunteer basis.

For guidance, Kondo and Tsutsumi turned to Erick Oh, one of their Pixar co-workers, who already held experience as an independent filmmaker. Oh was happy to oblige. As he grew more involved with the film, he moved beyond his mere advisory role to become the film's supervising animator. Although he had never worked in this position before, he found it to be like a "bridge" between animating (which he had done at Pixar) and directing (which he had done on his own films).

Official production began in early 2013. Although Kondo and Tsutsumi had planned to carry out most of the film's production within the three months that they took off from Pixar, this schedule was developed around an early version of the film that only ran for eight minutes. As the film's length expanded, eventually reaching eighteen minutes, the production period stretched into a total of nine months. "We just couldn't foresee the length of the story we wanted to tell in the beginning", Tsutsumi reflected. "[But] if you look at the math, three months of eight minutes to nine months of 18 minutes is not too bad." Commenting on the film's burgeoning run time, Kondo explained that eight minutes seemed insufficient to convey the kind of story that he and Tsutsumi wanted to tell - one in which a character's perception of life significantly changes. However, Kondo hopes that in the future, they will be able to make films with "just as much emotion in a shorter format."

=== Story development ===
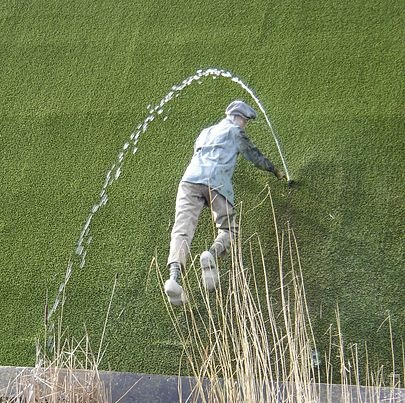
One of the film's influences was the folktale, The Little Dutch Boy - depicted here as a statue in the Netherlands.

Primarily interested in the opportunity of collaborating, Kondo and Tsutsumi did not have any specific story in mind when they commenced. They enjoy similar types of films, but did not immediately settle into the writing process - it took them some time to "find a way to do it together", Tsutsumi said. Their first idea centered on an old miner and his dog. This then evolved through four or five different iterations, before manifesting in its final form. Drawing inspiration from The Little Dutch Boy, a folktale about a young boy who saves his town by placing his finger in a dike, Kondo and Tsutsumi devised a character who would hold similar responsibility, except on a day-to-day basis.

Thematically, the duo sought to craft a story that would be true to familiar ordeals - they wanted anyone to be able to relate to the story. The dark fog that encroaches upon the town serves two purposes: it comments on the "contemporary reality" of pollution, while also symbolizing Pig's struggle with internal demons. Kondo explained that both he and Tsutsumi desired to create a world that feels "impermanent", in which things "don't seem like they can last forever." Both directors enjoy films that are "slow-paced, poetic, [and] very quiet." Although they tried to capture this aesthetic in The Dam Keeper, they were also concerned about the film lagging, and so they worked with their editor, Bradley Furnish, to make sure that the film has a balanced pace.

Tsutsumi has named Frédéric Back as his prime influence as an animator. "He [Back] always had something to say. For him, figuring out what was happening in society came first, before his craft", Tsutsumi said. Although the two directors did not seek to make a "social statement" with their film, commentary on world issues flowed naturally into their story. "[W]e tried hard to stay true to who we are", Tsutsumi said. [W]e are very conscious of what is happening today." Kondo has named Don Bluth as one of his influences, and both have named Hayao Miyazaki (Tsutsumi's uncle through marriage), as well as the films of Walt Disney - in particular, Pinocchio, Dumbo, and One Hundred and One Dalmatians.

Concept art for one of the story iterations that Kondo and Tsutsumi considered in-between their earliest idea and The Dam Keeper.

Many people have asked Kondo if Pig was based on him, and if Fox was based on Tsutsumi. However, each character was actually based on both filmmakers. "I think Pig might be who we are, but Fox is who we want to be", Tsutsumi explained. He described himself and Kondo as both being "somewhat introverted". Although he supposes that they are not quite as introverted as Pig, he feels that many artists are.

A test screening of the first story reel was organized for a group of Kondo and Tsutsumi's friends who had more writing experience than the two former art directors. As described by Kondo, the screening was "a disaster." The two directors recognized for themselves that the story was not working as they had wanted it to. "That was devastating", Tsutsumi said. The story was coming across as overly "heady" and did not connect emotionally. Although Kondo and Tsutsumi had wanted to finalize the story before starting production, they now had to revise it, while concurrently working on other aspects of the film. Otherwise, they would not have stayed on schedule. Looking forward, Kondo has noted that difficulties like this are unavoidable. He has said that he only hopes to be "more nimble" in dealing with them in the future.

One scene was cut from the finished film. It was halfway through animation at the time and was removed since the directors thought that it "distracted from the emotional arc" of the story. In the scene, Pig loses track of the time, crying alone in a classroom after school. As he rushes home to the windmill, the fog nearly rolls into the town.

=== Animation ===
As art directors at Pixar, Kondo and Tsutsumi were primarily responsible for creating concept paintings. Carrying little experience with them in the actual process of animating a film, the duo developed a visual style for The Dam Keeper that utilized their painting abilities. After creating the film's animation in TVPaint, a French digital animation program, brush-stroke effects were added to each frame in Photoshop. Although Tsutsumi described this approach as "time-consuming", he felt that it "paid off in the end."

Going into the project, Kondo and Tsutsumi already had similar painting styles. However, they decided to learn even more from each other and then trained their animating team to work within these styles. During their sabbatical from Pixar, the directors took their team outside to paint together and did still lifes with them as well. At first, the animators made little progress. "We went from at least the two of us painting every day and producing things for the film, to none of us", Kondo remarked on the situation. Not a single frame of the film was produced during the first month. The directors later described this moment as "terrifying". They began to worry that the film would never see completion. However, in a sudden turn, the animators began accomplishing more than their directors had ever anticipated of them. "Literally in a day...we went from zero to exceeding output for a week...expectations for what our production could be just exploded", Kondo said. The animators learned certain techniques even faster than Kondo and Tsutsumi had. When given a task, they often returned work of a higher quality than their directors had initially asked for.

"We wanted to animate light, and I think that's one of those things that's maybe unique about our film. We animated frame-by-frame the light...and we designed the light so that [it is] a huge cinematic component ...[the film] looks three-dimensional because of it."

— Co-director Daisuke "Dice" Tsutsumi on the importance of lighting to the film's animation style.

About 8,000 frames were created for the film. Even though 3D animation is not used in the finished version of the film, Maya and other 3D software programs were used for previsualization. The directors felt that this "allowed [for] the greatest exploration of scene layout in the shortest amount of time." Tsutsumi has said that many people have mistaken the film's animation for CGI "with a painterly texture over it". He actually considers this misconception to be complimentary, and he credits it to his and Kondo's painting style, which emphasizes light and "how the characters interact with [it]. On Photoshop, the animators used "adjustment layers to paint lighting on characters." This helped frames remain consistent between animators. To further aid in consistency, frames were compared in AfterEffects.

After creating scenes for the film, animators would upload them to the file sharing service Box, tagging the directors to indicate that the scenes "were ready for review." Kondo and Tsutsumi would then leave notes on the animators' work and do a paint-over. Because Box is able to save each version of a file, no one had to "worry about losing anything", Kondo explained. This helped him and Tsutsumi keep track of everything that was going on in the production. Kondo noted that without the ease of "communication, information organization and collaboration" provided by new technology, the film "would have had to have changed in scope, complexity and quality to be able to be done" on schedule." He feels that this would have been impossible to accomplish a decade earlier.

=== Music ===
The film's score was composed by Zach Johnston and Matteo Roberts. Johnston had previously collaborated with the directors on Tsutsumi's Sketchtravel, as a composer and co-writer. The four would often converse over Skype. Kondo and Tsutsumi have no musical background, but felt that they were "in great hands" with their composers. They were upfront about their lack of expertise in this area. When making suggestions for the score, they would acknowledge that their ideas might not be worth using. However, Johnston and Roberts both feel that the directors made valuable musical contributions. Johnston remarked that the directors made the score "more elegant and subtle" than it would have been otherwise. Noting the importance of this point, Roberts said that because Pig's pain has become normalized in his life, the score should only reflect "a tinge of sadness" and not be "overly dramatic". Both composers greatly enjoyed their time on the film. They felt a considerable amount of freedom in crafting the score and found that there was no pressure to mimic the sound of other composers. After completing the film, Johnston joked that his and Roberts' careers would be "all down hill from here...unless Dice and Robert ask us to do another one."

The demo score was created and recorded on Apple's GarageBand. Minna Choi then conducted MagicMagic Orchestra in performing the score live. They recorded at Fantasy Studios in Berkeley, California. The studio room contained a screen that would show corresponding scenes. Many of the instrumentalists found that they could not watch this without being overcome with emotion. As such, they had to avert their eyes. Tsutsumi related a moment when Choi was explaining the film's story to the orchestra, and he found her moved to tears. For his part, Kondo found it "mesmerizing" to watch Choi conduct. "There's something about watching someone who's incredible at their craft", he said. Commenting on Johnston and Roberts' score, Choi called it "tender", "sweet", and "innocent".

=== Post-production ===
When Kondo and Tsutsumi completed production on The Dam Keeper, they found themselves restless at Pixar. "Of course they were great to us", Kondo said of his friends at the studio. "They're our family still, but...if we didn't go back to [independent filmmaking] and challenge ourselves...in the end not only would we suffer but Pixar would suffer as well." He and Tsutsumi made the difficult decision of leaving their employment behind. Tsutsumi was a new father at the time. Kondo was soon to be married. Friends and family questioned them. However, the duo had grown deeply enamored with the experience of making films on their own. When they had first set out to direct The Dam Keeper, they had been looking for something that could mirror the early days of Pixar. "Creating something from scratch is what 'creating' means", Tsutsumi explained. "We didn't experience that beginning and, if we stayed at Pixar, we never would." The two of them felt they had learned more in the nine months that it took to produce The Dam Keeper than in all of their previous years as art directors. They did not want this rewarding period of their lives to only last for a short while.

Recognizing that it would only become harder with the passing years to go out on their own, Kondo and Tsutsumi resigned from Pixar in July 2014. From there, they founded their own studio, Tonko House. Although they would eventually move locations to Berkeley, California, at first Tonko House was situated within the same windowless studio that The Dam Keeper was produced in - right across the street from Pixar. Kondo and Tsutsumi invited their former boss and mentor, Ed Catmull, over for a visit. He gave the duo his blessing, saying, "This is the moment you'll remember no matter what it turns into, no matter how big it becomes...that first moment, when you create something from nothing, is the best time."

Tonko House derives its name from the Japanese words for pig (ton) and fox (ko). It was not the first name that Kondo and Tsutsumi considered, but all of their other ideas were already taken. To ensure that they came up with something unused, they settled on using a "nonsensical" word, but one that would still carry an "indirect" connection to their identity and work. Ko is an old-fashioned word and is not commonly used in the modern Japanese language.

== Release ==
The film was produced without clear intentions for its release. "[W]e didn’t make The Dam Keeper to enter festivals, we just wanted to make a film. But once it was done we wanted to share it", Tsutsumi said. The film was rejected by the first few festivals that it was submitted to. In February 2014, it was accepted at the 64th Berlin International Film Festival, where it had its world premiere. The US premiere followed in March, at the 17th New York International Children's Film Festival. In all, over ninety festivals have screened the film. The first public screening was held in December 2014 at a small cinema in Berkeley, California. At this screening, Kondo and Tsutsumi auctioned off original works of art.

With the film's Oscar nomination, it was picked up for theatrical distribution by Magnolia Pictures and Shorts HD. Premiering on January 30, 2015, in a compilation with the other 2014 Oscar-nominated, animated short films, it was screened in 350 theaters across North America, as well as several dozen in Europe and Latin America.

=== Critical reception ===
Collin Souter of Rogerebert.com called The Dam Keeper "a beautiful piece of work" and speculated that it may win the Academy Award for Best Animated Short Film. Justin Chang of Variety compared the film to Stephen King's dark novel Carrie. He complimented its "moody, muted" visual style, which he thought resembled both paint and chalk. Noting that the "ever-shifting images perfectly capture a fragile community that could easily vanish into the ether", he considered the film "emotionally harrowing." In an article for The New York Times, Charles Solomon wrote that the film's design "suggests a canvas in motion." In a separate article for The New York Times, A.O. Scott called the film "complex and rewarding." He praised its commentary on both the environment and emotional struggles, while finding the character designs to be "charming, without being especially cute." Carolyn Giardina of The Hollywood Reporter called the film's story "moving" and its visual design "beautiful." Freelance critic, activist, and published author Richard Propes wrote on his website, The Independent Critic, that the film was one of the best shorts at 2014's Heartland Film Festival. Although he was unsure why it had impacted him so greatly, he declared that the film would long linger with him after seeing it. Acknowledging it as less "designed for mass consumption" than most mainstream American animation, he nonetheless wrote that it should be considered equal in entertainment value. He gave the film an A− and praised its quiet, emotionally involving nature.

According to the New York Times, most professional animators considered The Dam Keeper the best of 2014's Oscar-nominated, animated short films. Disney producer Don Hahn praised the film saying, "There is a sameness to much animation, so when a film like The Dam Keeper comes along, it reminds us that the boundaries of animation have barely been explored." One of How to Train Your Dragon 2's writers and directors, Dean DeBlois, said that the animation style of The Dam Keeper resembles development artwork that has been given "life and poetry and movement."

=== Accolades ===
The film received an Oscar nomination for Best Animated Short Film at the 87th Academy Awards, but lost to Disney's Feast. Unable to finance an Oscar campaign, Kondo and Tsutsumi formed a grassroots strategy that relied on social media platforms. They had given little consideration to the possibility of an Oscar-nomination while making the film, and Tsutsumi called the revelation "a little bit overwhelming." It wasn't a part of Tonko House's plan", he said. To them, the true significance of the honor is that it shows their place within the animation community.

Awards
Award	Category	Recipient	Result	Ref(s)
87th Academy Awards	Best Animated Short Film	The Dam Keeper	Nominated	
San Francisco International Film Festival	Golden Gate Award		Won	
New York International Children's Film Festival	Kids Audience Award		Won	
TIFF Kids	Young People's Jury Award		Won	
Spark Animation Conference, Film Festival and Job Fair	Best Animated Short		Won	
San Diego Film Festival	Best Animated Film	The Dam Keeper	Won	

== Other projects ==
=== Graphic novels ===
First Second Books announced a collaboration with Tonko House to publish a trilogy of graphic novels that would expand Pig and Fox's adventures 5 years after the events of the short. In the graphic novels, the poisonous fog recedes for the first time, leading Pig and Fox to explore the beyond with the unlikely help of one of Pig's bullies, Hippo. Along the way, the questions raised from the short on the whereabouts of Pig's parents and the poisonous fog engulfing the other side of the dam to begin with, will be answered.

Robert Kondo, one of the directors and artists of The Dam Keeper, remarked that the continuation is "inspired by a personal anecdote of Tstusumi’s, [saying] that they’re interested in exploring how friendship evolves as [they] mature." They were "eight or ten" when "the kind of friends is different than when [they] grow up and start to learn about the world and who [they] are in the world.” The first graphic novel was scheduled to be published in 2016, but was delayed to September 26, 2017, while the second installment, "The Dam Keeper: World Without Darkness was published on July 10, 2018 and the third and final graphic novel titled "The Dam Keeper: Return from the Shadows" was published on July 2, 2019.

=== Feature film ===
There is also a feature film sequel to the short that is in development with Kondo and Tsutsumi returning as directors. Produced by former Blue Sky Studios producer Kane Lee, it is meant to also expand the adventures of Pig and Fox just like the trilogy of graphic novels.

Originally, when the feature film was announced, it was in collaboration with 20th Century Fox Animation during development. However, following The Walt Disney Company's acquisition with 21st Century Fox as of March 20, 2019, the film is currently being developed independently at Tonko House, looking for other movie studios to collaborate with.

=== Television series ===
Tonko House produced an animated television series based on the short titled Pig: The Dam Keeper Poems. It premiered on Hulu in Japan.
