= Jacoby Salcedo =

Mexican-American Illustrator

- Education: The School of Visual Arts New York City (SVA NYC)
- Awards: 2023 GLAAD Media Award for Outstanding Original Graphic Novel/Anthology
- Website: https://www.jacobysalcedoart.com/

Jacoby Salcedo is a Mexican-American Illustrator based in Olympia, Washington.

== Early life ==
Salcedo has said that he has always been drawing, referencing his father's nose as a key part of what ignited him in the beginning. He stated, "I've always been drawing, but I think what really ignited me was my Dad's nose haha! From a profile view, it looked really easy to draw and so I did just that, but from that moment, I never stopped drawing".

Salcedo used to create comic strips for his school newspaper, leading him to explore digital art. In high school, Salcedo began to consider potential careers and colleges, telling himself that he was not good at anything other than art and had no definite plans beyond that. Salcedo then developed an interest in comics, realizing that he could do it for a living.

Salcedo decided to attend the School of Visual Arts in New York City. During his time at SVA, Salcedo completed required courses such as sculpting, drawing, painting, and digital media. He's also mentioned his professor, Klaus Johnson, as the one who taught him about composition and storytelling in comics.

== Comics career ==
Jacoby Salcedo has collaborated on several graphic novels, including DC Comics' This Land is Our Land: A Blue Beetle Story, with author Julio Anta. He is also the illustrator behind the graphic novel, Frontera, alongside Anta.

Salcedo is also the co-creator and illustrator for Dark Horse Miniseries It's Only Teenage Wasteland alongside writer Curt Pires.

Salcedo has been featured in several comic anthologies, such as producing inks for DC's Legions of Blooms and DC's Kal-El-fornia Love. He's also produced variant covers for the graphic novel, Home. He's also featured in the anthology Young Men in Love.

== Awards ==
- 2023 GLAAD Media Award for Outstanding Original Graphic Novel/Anthology.
