= Jen Wang =

American cartoonist, writer, and illustrator

Jennifer Sheena Wang
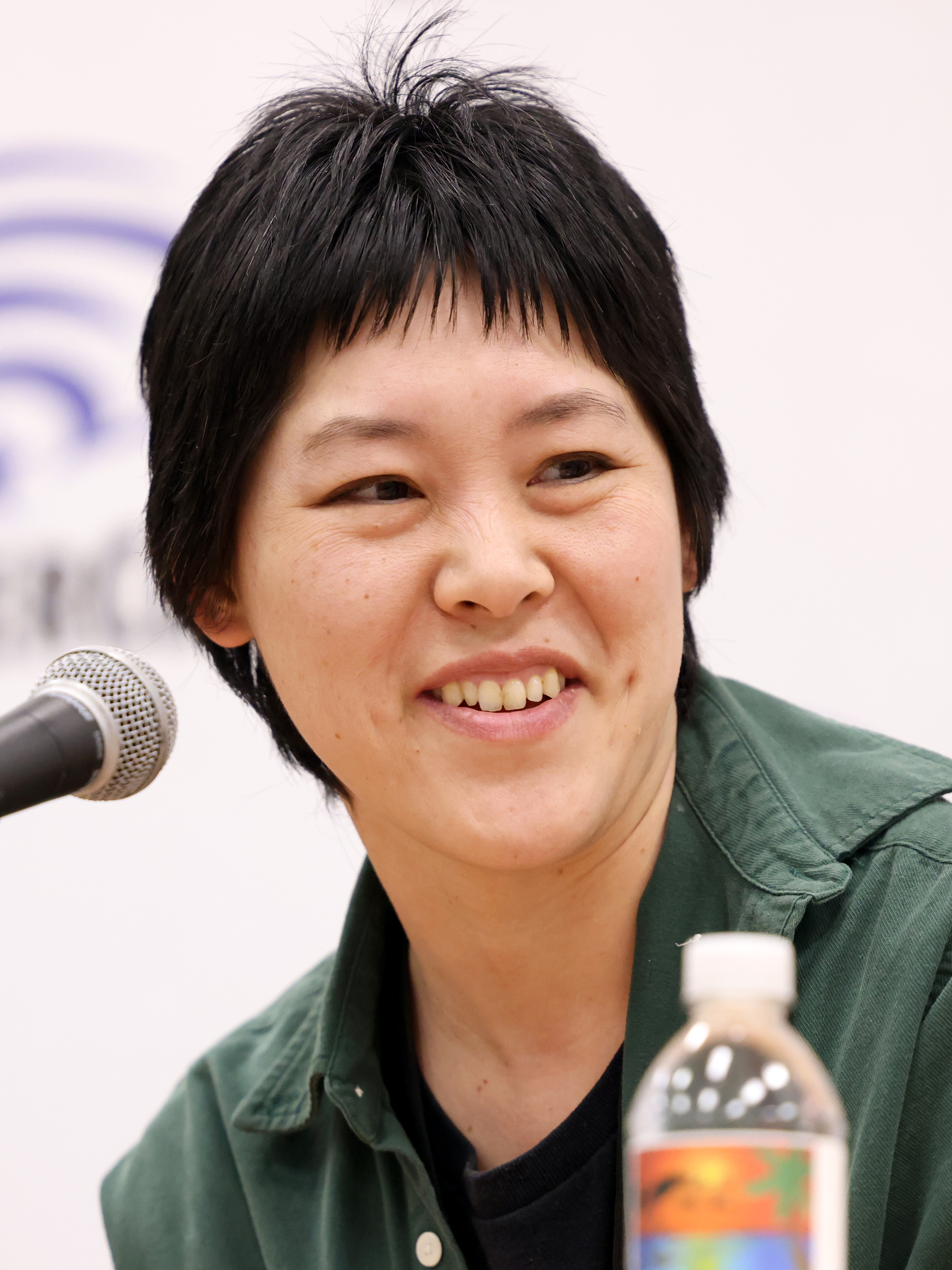
- Born: March 22, 1984 (age 42); Alameda County, California, U.S.
- Education: San Francisco State University (BA)
- Occupations: Cartoonist, writer, and illustrator

Jennifer Sheena "Jen" Wang (born March 22, 1984) is an American cartoonist, writer and illustrator based in Los Angeles. Wang has published graphic books including Koko Be Good, In Real Life (with Cory Doctorow), and The Prince and the Dressmaker. Wang is a co-founder and organizer for Los Angeles-based comics festival Comic Arts LA. Jen's art work has been published in Adventure Time and LA Magazine.

== Early life and education ==
Wang was born in Northern California. Wang's parents are immigrants from Taiwan. Wang was raised in the Bay Area of California. During high school, Wang was a manga reader.

Wang graduated from San Francisco State University, first majoring in film, but then changed her major to sociology.

== Career ==
Wang started drawing the webcomic Strings of Fate.

In 2010, Wang wrote her first graphic novel Koko Be Good.

In 2014, Wang became the co-founder and organizer of Comic Arts Los Angeles (CALA), which was held at the Think Tank Gallery in Los Angeles, California.

Wang is also the creator of a webcomic called The White Snake.

== Awards and recognition ==
- 2014 Cybils Award for Best Graphic Novel for In Real Life by Cory Doctorow and Jen Wang. In Real Life was published by First Second Books. In Real Life is based on Cory Doctorow's short story Anda's Game.
- 2018 Harvey Award for The Prince and the Dressmaker tied in a win for Best Children or Young Adult Book. It was nominated in the Book of the Year category as well.
- 2019 Eisner Award - Best Writer/Artist for The Prince and the Dressmaker.
- 2019 Eisner Award - best publications for teens (ages 13–17) for The Prince and the Dressmaker.
- 2020 Asian/Pacific American Award for Literature in Children's Literature category for Stargazing.

== Works ==
This is a partial list of books written or illustrated by Wang.

- 2007 Flight Volume 1 & 2
- 2010 Koko Be Good. As writer and illustrator. Published by First Second Books.
- 2012 Fake Mustache. As illustrator. Published by Amulet/Abrams.
- 2014 In Real Life. Illustrator.
- 2014 The White Snake (serialized)
- 2016 Lumberjanes: Makin' the Ghost of It.
- 2018 The Prince and the Dressmaker. Published by First Second Books.
- 2019 Stargazing. Published by First Second.
- 2024 Ash's Cabin. Published by First Second.

== Personal life ==
Wang lives in Los Angeles, California.

== See also ==
- List of Eisner Award winners
- Lumberjanes
