= Boxers and Saints =

2013 graphic novels by Gene Luen Yang

- The cover of Boxers (left) and the cover of Saints (right), respectively.
- Date: 2013
- Publisher: First Second Books

Creative team
- Writer: Gene Luen Yang
- Colorist: Lark Pien

Boxers and Saints are two companion graphic novel volumes written and illustrated by Gene Luen Yang, and colored by Lark Pien. The publisher First Second Books released them on September 10, 2013. Together the two volumes have around 500 pages.

Boxers follows the story of Little Bao, a boy from Shan-tung (Shandong) who becomes a leader of the Boxer Rebellion. Saints follows the story of "Four-Girl", a girl from the same village who becomes a Catholic, adopts the name "Vibiana", and hopes to attain the glory of Joan of Arc.

One book cover shows the left half of Bao's face with Qin Shi Huangdi and the other shows the right half of Vibiana's face with Joan of Arc. Together the covers portray a divided China.

== Development ==
Yang stated that the event that sparked his interest in the Boxer Rebellion was learning how, at the time, becoming Christian was perceived as forsaking Chinese culture, a concept alien to him as he grew up in a Roman Catholic Chinese American community in the San Francisco Bay Area.

Yang said that he wanted to do two volumes because he was not sure which side in the conflict were "good" or "bad" and he noticed connections between contemporary terrorists and the Boxers. Yang said "So in a lot of ways, I was trying to write the story of a young man who was essentially a terrorist, and I wanted him to be sympathetic, but I also didn't want the book to feel like I was condoning terrorism. So it was kind of a fine line." He explained that he needed two different characters so the reader can "see everything through".

Yang took six years to make the books. The first one or two years went into research. He visited a library on a university campus to read books and compile notes. He visited the library once weekly for a period of one year. Much of the research came from The Origins of the Boxer Uprising by Joseph Esherick. He also visited an archive in Vanves, France made by the Jesuits; this archive included photos depicting violence during the Boxer rebellion, causing Yang to conclude that he needed to portray the said violence in his works. So he himself and his readers could stomach the violence, Yang deliberately used a cartoonish and simple manner of illustration.

The books were different lengths due to the differing natures of the respective stories. Yang stated that he encountered more difficulty writing Saints, in which the Christians stay in the same place and defend themselves, compared to Boxers, in which the characters go on an adventure. The reason was that he wanted to find a visually interesting way to present the converts' internal struggles. Yang outlined both books together and made the volumes separate. He scripted and drew the two volumes separately, scripting Boxers first, then simultaneously scripting Saints while drawing Boxers, and finally drawing Saints. He worked on an unrelated superhero comic in-between drawing the two volumes to deal with his emotions. Yang decided that a reader needed to be able to enjoy each individual book as a story of its own and not only together, so he gave the beginning-middle-end narrative structure to each.

Yang has described Boxers and Saints as "historical fiction". In Boxers, Yang began including more history as the characters reach Peking (Beijing). The author said that his process in making the story was creating Bao, taking "just the bits and pieces that we do know about the beginnings of the Boxer Rebellion and weave it into his fictional life story." In Saints, Yang modeled the style off of American autobiographical comics, and the color scheme of Saints is far more limited than that of Boxers.

Since many older American comic books used gibberish writing to portray foreign languages and since Yang wished to use the point of view of the Chinese, he decided that doing this for characters speaking non-Chinese languages would show how the Chinese considered them to be foreign.

The font used for the books' captions was derived from the handwriting style of Yang's wife.

== Plot ==
Boxers begins in Shan-tung at the turn of the century. Lee Bao, or Little Bao, enjoys the ancient tradition and heritage of his village until their tranquility is disrupted by a foreign monk who smashes the town's god and urges them to convert to Christianity. After floods affect the farms, many believe that the foreigners are invoking the wrath of Heaven upon the land. An oil salesman, Red Lantern Chu, comes and performs wondrous things, such as curing an old woman's lazy eye with a single jab to the neck. He reveals he is in a society against the foreign devils, and 4 village boys choose to join his mission. Bao tries, but is stopped by Chu. Chu teaches him kung-fu in secret, and gives him a map to an ancient mountain to further his training. However, he gets kicked off and told to never come back after believing that his new trainer, Master Big Belly, had grown fat on food, and tries to steal from his bean garden. Eventually, on a mission, Chu is beheaded, and his head is impaled on a stake carried by a soldier on horseback. Bao runs to the mountain, where Master Big Belly reveals his stomach is full of ancient wisdom, and his bean garden represents the many Chinese gods. Bao learns to channel them into himself and saves the 4 boys who joined Chu from being shot and killed. He then decides to join them, and renames them "the Society of the Righteous and Harmonious Fist". He quickly rises in the ranks, and aided by the spirits of Qin Shi Huangdi, Sun Wu Kong, Guan Yu, and many others, his swelling army launches a bloody crusade against "foreign devils," i.e. Europeans and Christian missionaries. They also target "secondary devils," which are native Chinese who have converted to Christianity. In bloodier and bloodier battles, they eventually earn the attention of the Qing government and the respect of the elite Kansu Braves. Under Bao's leadership, the Boxers become increasingly fanatical and soon begin killing Christian women and children. Bao's assault on a Christian fortress results in him and Vibiana interacting, where he executes her for refusing to give up her faith.

Upon reaching the capital, the Boxers learn that the Empress' clandestine backing may give them an edge over the foreigners. With Prince Tuan's support and the Kansu braves' men, the Boxer rebellion takes off, with the death of Baron von Ketteler and many others occurring. Bao also stops channeling Qin Shi Huangdi, and instead becomes an unnamed Fire God. When the siege of the foreigners' compound fails to get results, Bao controversially attempts to break through by burning down the Hanlin Academy library, which contains ancient priceless texts that preserved a thousand years of Chinese cultural heritage. However, the foreign armies arrive at the last moment, and defeat the Boxers in a torrent of bullets. In what appears to be Bao's final moments, he sees the Gods of the Opera fleeing, leaving them to die.

Saints begins in the same area, where a young girl, born on the fourth day of the fourth month, is the fourth born and yet first child of her mother to reach adulthood. Because of the earlier deaths of her would-be siblings and her father, she is not given a proper name by her grandfather, who favors an older cousin, Chung. She is simply called "Four-Girl." In attempting to win his love, "Four-girl" accidentally destroys the family's house idol while trying to prove her wood chopping skill, causing her grandfather to call her a "devil." She then starts wearing a "devil face" in public, encouraging her family members to be put on edge by her mere presence. When her mother says she will take her to a nearby acupuncturist to try to fix her face, she is encouraged by a raccoon spirit that she met in the forest and decides that she will never let the acupuncturist win. When she visits Dr. Won, the acupuncturist, she sees a crucifix with a man on it that she dubs "the acupuncture victim". He causes her to laugh with a strange face, and gives her 2 coins to pretend that they will be his payment. However, she drops pebbles into his collection bowl instead, and keeps the coins. She witnesses a "foreign devil," Father Bey, destroy an idol in public and decides to visit Dr. Won again, to learn how to be a "devil." He is overjoyed that she has come to learn about biblical stories, although she is motivated by the food his wife brings. After she decides to get baptized, she chooses Vibiana as her Christian name and for the first time is called something other than Four-girl or devil. However, upon learning that she has become a Christian, she is physically abused by her family. She decides to run away to serve Father Bey when he is sent to a new area by his overseers.

Vibiana and Father Bey discuss her potential roles of service in the church and Vibiana eventually cares for orphans, since the church forbids female priesthood. All the while she is visited by apparitions of Joan of Arc, whom she believes is not only protecting her, but leading her to become a maiden knight. However, all such hopes are dashed because the news of the Boxers arrives, driving refugees into their citadel. The Boxers attack, and overwhelm the guards. Father Bey is killed, just after Dr. Won sacrifices himself to save him. The congregation is burnt inside a church, as revealed in Boxers. Vibiana is bound with rope by Boxers, but Little Bao saves her from being raped by Lee Chuan-tai, his second brother and a fellow Boxer. He nonetheless demands for her to recant or be killed, but she refuses, as the Church gave her a name and an identity. Before her death, Vibiana teaches Bao a prayer, and sees apparitions of Joan of Arc burning at the stake. She sees a syncretic vision of Christ, who tells her not to renounce her faith, and recites the Parable of the Good Samaritan with the healing and pierced hands of Guan Yin, saying "So please, Vibiana, be as mindful of others as I am of you." Vibiana dies having felt she had helped no one.

Saints' epilogue provides the conclusion to both stories. Little Bao, thrown into a mass grave following the Boxers' defeat, is revealed to have survived and tries to escape. He is about to be executed by the foreign soldiers and pleads for mercy. He attempts to recite the prayer Vibiana taught him, muttering repeatedly, "Our Father...". The soldiers thus believe he is a Christian and let him go. Ashamed at having pretended to be a foreign devil to escape, he is picked up by Chuan-tai, who reminds him of their oath of brotherhood.

== Analysis ==
Boxers and Saints blends historical facts with fictional elements to explore the human experiences and motivations behind the Boxer Rebellion. While the Boxer Rebellion was a real historical event, the specific stories of Little Bao and Vibiana are fictional creations by Gene Luen Yang. His primary goal was to dive into the psychological and emotional complexities of the characters and the broader social and cultural context of the time, rather than just providing a historically accurate account. In an interview Yang comments on one of the main social dilemmas that motivated him to write this novel, stating "In China just over a hundred years ago, being a Chinese Christian was seen as a contradiction. Embracing a Western faith meant turning your back on Eastern culture". The boxer rebellion was a complex and multifaceted event, with many factors contributing to its outbreak and development. Yang's work offers a unique perspective of this historical period with its complex battle of contradicting ideologies, as he states that he "wanted to show that the same event could be interpreted in radically different ways, depending on a person's life history".

Wesley Yang of The New York Times wrote that "Despite the ostensibly evenhanded way Yang presents opposed perspectives, it's clear he views the Boxer Rebellion as a series of massacres conducted by xenophobes who wound up harming the very culture they had pledged to protect."

Dan Solomon of The Austin Chronicle wrote that the books are "very personal and character-driven, which isn't necessarily what you might anticipate when you have 500 pages in front of you about the Boxer Rebellion."

Sheng-mei Ma, author of Sinophone-Anglophone Cultural Duet, stated that Saints is overall a more comedic work than Boxers and that the scenes of Vibiana being bored of Christian history shows "self-deprecating humor" from the Roman Catholic author.

== Characters ==
- Lee Bao or "Little Bao" – Becomes the leader of the boxer rebellion. Bao grows up in Shan-tung and starts a rebellion after his fellow villagers are killed by imperial authorities acting under the direction of foreign powers. As Bao continues his quest, he begins committing more gruesome killings. His given name means "treasure". Jee Yoon Lee of Hyphen Magazine wrote that "As the story draws to an end, Yang shows Bao as a morally complicated hero whose decisions expose the inevitable tragedy of civil warfare."
  - Yang wrote that he wanted to make his actions understandable but he did not want to justify them. Yang stated "The Boxers have a lot in common with many of today's extremist movements in the Middle East. Little Bao would probably be labeled a terrorist if he were real and alive today." Yang stated that he did not want to have the comic approve of terrorism, but he also wanted Bao to be a sympathetic character. Sheng-mei Ma stated that since Bao shows excitement over Chinese culture, Bao serves as the "alter ego" of the U.S.-born Yang, who would find Chinese history to be exotic from his point of view.
- Four-Girl/Vibiana – Chinese girl who converts to Catholicism. She was named "Four-Girl" due to her birth order. The character for four (Chinese: 四; pinyin: sì; Wade–Giles: ssu^{4}) sounds similar to that of "death" (死; sǐ; ssu^{3}) in Chinese, so her name has a negative connotation. Many people around her call her "devil" so she thinks of herself one. She stumbles onto a group of Catholics, thinking it is "devil training". She initially comes for food, but becomes a Catholic and does missionary work. Bao kills her when she refuses to renounce Catholicism. Vibiana's inspiration was a relative of Yang who had been mistreated by her family due to her birth date, as it was unlucky in Chinese culture, who converted to Catholicism. Sheng-mei Ma states that the comedic scenes of Vibiana being bored with Christian stories reflects Yang's familiarity with Christianity, which a typical American would have.
- Red Lantern Chu – A cooking oil salesperson and martial arts master, Chu serves as Bao's mentor. Yang found Chu in the book The Origins of the Boxer Uprising.
- Kong – A former thief, Kong and Vibiana have an odd relationship. Kong eventually tells Vibiana about his past, and how he ended up at the Semerian. He explains how he got his rat whisker scars, and why he is indebted to the priest, Father Bey. Vibiana suggests marriage teasingly. He later proposes, but she rejects him, saying she was over the idea, after hearing about the boxers, and is not willing to marry at such hard times, but indicates that she may have feelings for him. Kong then, (after some convincing) teaches her how to fight, so that she can be a Maiden Warrior. Kong later dies, shot in the head by an arrow.
- Mei-wen – Bao's love interest and leader of the Red Lanterns, treasures the ancient Hanlin Academy library in Peking (Beijing). She transforms into Mu Guiying when fighting, but later in the story she champions the ideas of Guan Yin. After Bao sets the library on fire, Mei-wen harshly criticizes him. Mei-wen goes into the library with a foreign scholar and attempts to salvage books until the library collapses, killing her.
- Father Bey – A French missionary working in China. Disgusted by church corruption in his own country, he decided to go to China after hearing largely false propaganda about Chinese religion. He first appears in Bao's village and smashes the idol of the local harvest god. After seeing this, Bao grows up with a general hatred of Europeans. Four-Girl, however, is inspired by his action to join the church and become a 'devil' herself. When she runs away from home Father Bey allows her to travel with him. He is eventually killed by the Society, along with all of his congregation. He was based on several missionaries spreading Catholicism in China.
- Dr. Won – An acupuncturist in Bao and Four-Girl's village who converts to Catholicism. He is a gentle man who embraces the non-violent side of his religion. He becomes Four-Girl's friend and introduces her to the Catholic faith. He introduces her to Father Bey when she tells him of her vision of Joan of Arc, and encourages her actions afterward. Father Bey, however, rejects Dr. Won, stating he is an opium addict. Vibiana loses faith in him when she discovers this firsthand. He is killed by the Society trying to defend Father Bey. He is based on Saint Mark Ji Tianxiang, one of the Martyr Saints of China.
- Joan of Arc- Joan is the spirit of the French heroine Joan of Arc. She appears around Vibiana and guides her through Catholicism, even on the day that Vibiana is killed. Yang stated that Joan of Arc was a character in the story "because I was struck by this common humanity between the Europeans and the Chinese." Yang compared Joan's battles against the English, done to free France from foreign rule, with the Boxers' fight against foreigners.
- Shi Huangdi – Shi Huangdi is the deified first emperor of China who acts as Bao's spiritual mentor once Bao learns the technique of Chinese spirit possession. He also is the form that Bao channels upon using the technique. This ritual gives the Bao and the Boxers supernatural powers in battle. A brutal tactician who urges Bao to be ruthless and decisive, he attempts to aid Bao in his quest to save China from the foreign devils. He and the other gods abandon Bao and the Boxers when they are defeated at the Foreign Legation.
- There is a raccoon character who serves as an evil spirit who tries to influence Vibiana to do harmful acts. Sheng-mei Ma suggested that the raccoon reflected Yang's western background as raccoons are not common in Chinese stories.

== Awards and nominations ==
- National Book Awards Finalist, Young People's Literature 2013
- Booklist Top 10 Religion and Spirituality Books for Youth 2013
- School Library Journal Best Books of the Year 2013
- 2013 Los Angeles Times Book Prize (Young adult literature) winner.

== See also ==
- Catholic Church in China
- Gengzi Guobian Tanci
- Cultural depictions of Joan of Arc
- American Born Chinese, a comic by Yang
