= Tonko House =

Independent animation studio

Tonko House LLC
- Industry: Animation
- Founded: July 2014; 12 years ago
- Founder: Robert Kondo; Daisuke Tsutsumi
- Headquarters: Berkeley, California, United States
- Key people: Robert Kondo; Daisuke Tsutsumi

Tonko House LLC is an independent animation studio located in Berkeley, California, founded in July 2014 by former Pixar art directors, Robert Kondo and Daisuke Tsutsumi.

The company is best known for its first animated Oscar nominated short film, The Dam Keeper, which was released in 2014, the same year the company was founded.

== Filmography ==
- The Dam Keeper (TBA, in development)
- Leo (TBA, in development)

=== Short films ===
- The Dam Keeper (2014)
- Moom (2016, in collaboration with Marza Animation Planet and Craftar)

=== Television ===
- Pig: The Dam Keeper Poems (2017)
- Go! Go! Cory Carson (2020, production design)
- Oni: Thunder God's Tale (2022, in collaboration with Dwarf Animation and Megalis)
- Sleepy Pines (TBA, in development)

== Books ==
=== Graphic novels ===
- The Dam Keeper (2017, a collaboration with First Second Books)
- The Dam Keeper: World Without Darkness (2018, a collaboration with First Second Books)
- The Dam Keeper: Return From The Shadows (2019, a collaboration with First Second Books)

== Accolades ==
=== Academy Awards ===
Year	Film	Category	Recipient(s)	Result
2014	The Dam Keeper	Best Animated Short Film	Robert Kondo and Daisuke Tsutsumi	Nominated

=== Annie Awards ===
Year	Film	Category	Recipient(s)	Result
2017	Pig: The Dam Keeper Poems	Best Animated Special Production	Erick Oh	Nominated
