= Asaf Hanuka =

Israeli illustrator and comic book artist

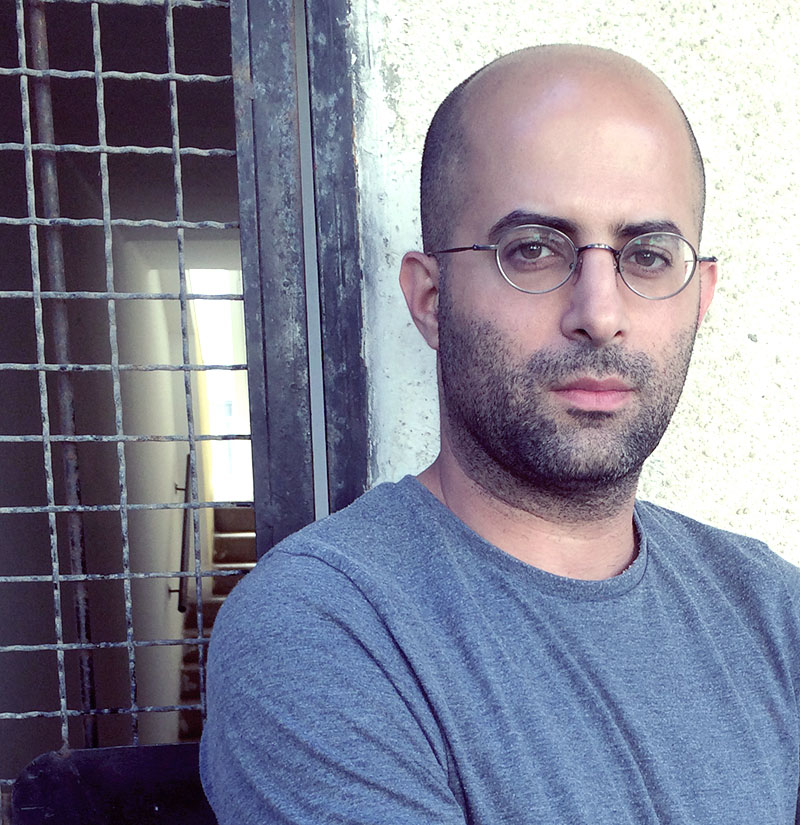
- Asaf Hanuka
- Born: אסף חנוכה; 1974 (age 51–52) Tel Aviv, Israel
- Areas: Cartoonist, Writer, Artist
- Notable works: The Divine; The Realist; I'm Still Alive; Pizzeria Kamikaze

Asaf Hanuka (Hebrew: אסף חנוכה; born 1974) is an Israeli illustrator and comic book artist, notable for his autobiographical comic The Realist. He is the twin brother of illustrator Tomer Hanuka.

== Career ==
During his compulsory army service, he began collaborating with Israeli writer Etgar Keret. In 1997, a collection of Etgar's stories illustrated by Hanuka was published under the title "Streets of Rage". Their second collaboration, "Pizzeria Kamikaze" was nominated for Eisner awards in 2007 and translated into English, French, and Spanish.

Hanuka collaborated with French writer Didier Daeninckx on "Carton Jaune!" in 2004, published in France.

Together with his twin brother Tomer, Asaf co-created Bipolar, an experimental comic book series that was nominated for the Ignatz awards. Tomer and Asaf co-created “The Dirties”, a short narrative available online. They are currently collaborating on a graphic novel called The Divine, written by Boaz Lavie, released in 2015 in both English and French.

Asaf also contributed art to the Oscar-nominated war documentary animated film Waltz with Bashir.

His autobiographical comics The Realist started in January 2010, have been published in Calcalist [Israeli business magazine]. It won a gold medal from the Society of Illustrators in 2010, an Award of Excellence from Communication Arts Annual, and a silver medal from 3X3. Two collections of The Realist pages were published in book form in France in 2012 and 2014, and have been translated into six languages.

Hanuka has been commercially illustrating since 1995. Among his clients are Nike, Inc., Canal+, Rolling Stone, Fortune, The New York Times, Time, The Wall Street Journal, Forbes, PC Magazine, Newsweek, and Men’s Health.

== Published works ==
In English

- Bipolar with Tomer Hanuka. Alternative Comics
- Pizzeria Kamikaze with Etgar Keret. Alternative Comics. 2005. ISBN 1-891867-90-3
- I'm Still Alive. With Roberto Saviano. Archaia. 2022. ISBN 978-16-8415-442-5.

In Hebrew

- Simtaot Hazaam [Streets of Fury], by Etgar Keret, Zmora Bitan, 1997
- The Realist, Pardes Publishing, 2017
- Who Murdered Avraham Eliahu?, 2023

In French

- Carton Jaune!, with Didier Daeninckx, (publisher) Hachette 2004
- K.O. a Tel Aviv collection of The Realist comics strips, (publisher) Steinkis 2012
- K.O. a Tel Aviv 2 second collection of The Realist comics strips, (publisher) Steinkis 2014
- K.O. a Tel Aviv 3 third collection of The Realist comics strips, (publisher) Steinkis 2016
- Le Divin, with Tomer Hanuka, story by Boaz Lavie, Dargaud, 2015
- Le Juif Arabe, (publisher) Steinkis 2023

== Filmography ==
Year	Title	Adaptation	Ref.
2008	Waltz with Bashir	Yes	
TBA	I'm Still Alive	Yes	
