= American Born Chinese (graphic novel) =

2006 graphic novel by Gene Luen Yang

- Cover art of the first edition
- Author: Gene Luen Yang
- Illustrator: Gene Luen Yang
- Language: English
- Genre: Graphic novel
- Publisher: First Second Books
- Publication date: 2006
- Publication place: United States
- Media type: Print (paperback & hardback collector's edition)
- Pages: 240 pp (paperback edition)
- ISBN: 978-1-59643-152-2

American Born Chinese is a graphic novel by Gene Luen Yang. Released in 2006 by First Second Books, it was a finalist for the 2006 National Book Awards in the category of Young People's Literature. It won the 2007 Michael L. Printz Award, the 2007 Eisner Award for Best Graphic Album: New, the Publishers Weekly Comics Week Best Comic of the Year, the San Francisco Chronicle Best Book of the Year, the 2006/2007 Best Book Award from The Chinese American Librarians Association, and Amazon.com Best Graphic Novel/Comic of the Year. It also made the Booklist Top Ten Graphic Novel for Youth, the NPR Holiday Pick, and Time Top Ten Comic of the Year. It was colored by cartoonist Lark Pien, who received the 2007 Harvey Award for Best Colorist for her work on the book.

== Synopsis ==
The story of American Born Chinese consists of three seemingly separate tales, which are tied together at the end of the book.

The first storyline is Yang's contemporary rendition of the Chinese story of the Kung Fu-practicing Monkey King of Flower-Fruit Mountain (The Monkey King is a character from the classic 16th century Chinese novel Journey to the West). Yang replaces the Buddha from the original story with a Christian-influenced deity Tze-Yo-Tzuh. Throughout the story, The Monkey King is unhappy with himself as a monkey and continually tries to become another version of himself. The Monkey King grows larger, taking a more human form. After being rejected from a divine dinner party, he takes down every deity that has been sent to stop him, growing stronger with each kill. The lesser deities plead to the most powerful being in the world, Tze-Yo-Tzuh, to stop The Monkey King. Tze-Yo-Tzuh tries to help The Monkey King accept himself, but when The Monkey King refuses, Tze-Yo-Tzuh imprisons him under a mountain of rocks. A monk named Wong Lai-Tsao is sent by Tze-Yo-Tzuh on a mission to carry three packages to the west and is to pick up his disciple, The Monkey King, on his journey. He finds The Monkey King imprisoned under the mountain of rocks and frees him from the mountain by convincing The Monkey King to return to his original form.

The second storyline follows a child of Chinese immigrants named Jin Wang. His story links the other two narratives, and fits the form of an ethnic coming-of-age. His family moves from San Francisco's Chinatown to a suburb where he goes to school with only one other Asian student, Suzy Nakamura. The teachers and other students in Jin's school are all ignorant of his Chinese culture. Jin struggles with his Chinese identity and begins to reject it until he meets a new Asian student, Wei-Chen Sun. Wei-Chen is a Taiwanese immigrant who just came to the United States, and he and Jin become best friends. Wei-Chen begins dating Suzy Nakamura, and she joins the group of friends. Jin begins dating Amelia Harris, a Caucasian girl in his class, but her friend Greg asks Jin not to ask her out anymore because he felt she needed to protect her image. Jin perceives this as a personal attack on him because of his race. Angry and confused, he kisses Suzy and the friends have a falling-out. That evening, Jin recalls the fight he had with Wei-Chen and convinces himself that Wei-Chen deserved it. That night, Jin has a dream about a Chinese woman he had met when he was younger who had told him that he could be anything he wanted if he was willing to give up his soul. He awakens the next morning and looks in the mirror to see himself as a Caucasian boy, and he changes his name to Danny.

The third storyline follows Danny, a 16-year-old "all-American" boy, and his Chinese cousin Chin-Kee, who has visited Danny annually for the past three years. Danny is embarrassed by Chin-Kee, who is depicted as a racist stereotype, in traditional queue with buck teeth, speaking in pidgin English. At the story's climax, Danny fights Chin-Kee when the latter refuses to leave. When Danny punches Chin-Kee, he reveals himself to be the Monkey King in disguise, causing Danny to transform back into Jin as well. The Monkey King tells Jin that his son Wei-Chen was sent to live among the mortals without sin for forty years but no longer wanted to follow in his father's footsteps of serving humans after becoming sickened by his classmates' self-centeredness. Wei-Chen refused his father's visits, so the Monkey King began visiting "Danny" instead, using the Chin-Kee disguise to remind Jin of his heritage and convince him to rise above negative stereotypes. Jin reconciles with Wei-Chen and finally accepts his Chinese identity. An epilogue image shows the two recording a music video together (based on the Back Dorm Boys).

== Character list ==
- The Monkey King: A monkey who has lived for thousands of years and mastered all the heavenly disciplines. He yearns to join the ranks of gods, and after being rejected, goes on a rampage. He managed to defeat many gods and goddesses, but was buried under a mountain by Tze-Yo-Tzuh for five hundred years. He was later released by Wong Lai-Tsao and accompanies him on his journey as a disciple. Because of their success, he was granted the role of emissary for Tze-Yo-Tzuh.
- Tze-Yo-Tzuh: Tze-Yo-Tzuh (Chinese: 自有者; pinyin: zìyǒuzhě) is the creator of the universe and all the deities. In the part of American Born Chinese that is adapted from Journey to the West, Tze-Yo-Tzuh has the role played by the Buddha in the original story. Yang made this change as he is a Christian (specifically, Roman Catholic) and not Buddhist.
- Wong Lai-Tsao: Based upon Tang Sanzang from Journey to the West. Wong Lai-Tsao is a monk sent on a journey by Tze-Yo-Tzuh. He is promised the Monkey King as a disciple.
- Jin Wang: Jin Wang is a Chinese-American boy who wants to fit in with the white students at his new school in a suburb. He doesn't like talking too much at school, especially in front of Amelia, the girl he has a crush on. He is finally encouraged by his friend, Wei-Chen, to ask her out. But this relationship is short lived. Greg, Amelia's friend, asks Jin to break up with her because he doesn't think Jin is right for Amelia.
- Amelia Harris: Amelia Harris is a white American girl who is the classmate of Jin and Wei-Chen. Jin has a crush on her.
- Wei-Chen Sun: Wei-Chen Sun is a Taiwanese immigrant who slowly becomes Jin's best friend. His girlfriend is Suzy Nakamura. It is revealed at the story's conclusion that he is the Monkey King's eldest son, and originally wanted to become an emissary, but abandoned his role after being betrayed by Jin. He believed humans to be "petty, soulless creatures" and wanted to spend the rest of his days using the mortal world for his pleasure.
- Suzy Nakamura: Suzy Nakamura is a young Japanese-American girl in Jin and Wei-Chen's class. She starts dating Wei-Chen in middle school.
- Greg: Greg is a white American boy and a friend of Amelia Harris. While he initially appears nice, it is later revealed he is racist, disapproving of Jin's relationship with Amelia.
- Danny: Danny is a white "average" American boy. Danny is always irritated and embarrassed by his Asian cousin Chin-Kee. Since Chin-Kee's annual visits began when Danny was in eighth grade, Danny has had to change schools every year since due to the appearance and mannerisms of Chin-Kee ruining his perception by his peers. Danny turns out to be Jin Wang, under a new identity.
- Chin-Kee: Chin-Kee is a startling caricature of negative Chinese stereotypes. He is Danny's larger-than-life Chinese cousin who, to Danny's embarrassment, comes to visit every year. Chin-Kee wears antiquated Chinese clothing, the traditional queue hairstyle, and literally has yellow skin, buck teeth, and eyes squinting so tightly that the pupils cannot be seen. He loudly speaks extraordinary "Chinglish" at all times, likes to play tricks on people, and possesses an unnatural sexual appetite. Chin-Kee is the Monkey King in disguise.
  - Chin-Kee and his behavior are references to various perceived stereotypes, including images by Pat Oliphant and reactions to William Hung. Chin-Kee's name sounds like the ethnic insult "chinky" when said aloud. Yang said that when he heard some people argue Chin-Kee was cute, he stated that he wished he designed the character to appear even more like stereotypes.

== Themes ==
=== Racial struggles and stereotypes ===
According to Min Hyoung Song, American Born Chinese possesses strong themes of racial stereotypes, particularly American stereotypes of the Chinese and other East Asian ethnicities. The primary example of these stereotypes is Chin-Kee, who is the embodiment of the term "coolie," a nineteenth-century racial slur for unskilled Chinese workers. According to Chaney, he is "an incarnation of the 'Yellow Peril' era of racism" which Song defines as "slant-eyes, short stature, sallow skin, predictably Chinese clothing, claw-like fingertips, and long menacing queue". In addition, Chin-Kee continually switches his "L's" and "R's" during speech. The American roots of Chin-Kee's stereotypes are emphasized by the style of the illustrations, which are drawn to simulate an American television show. Song mentions that "[t]o emphasize further that this is an image originally formalized in newspapers and popular entertainment and later largely disseminated through the growth of popular mass media, the words 'clap clap clap' line the entire bottom of the panel...This, and the words 'ha ha ha,' are likewise repeated in other panels, replicating the canned laughter and applause of television sit-coms." Just as the media that have enforced these stereotypes have changed, so have some of the stereotypes themselves. Chin-Kee does not only represent a version of nineteenth-century racial stereotypes, but also of the more contemporary stereotype that all Asians make exceptional students. During class with Danny, Chin-Kee knows the answer to every question in every school subject, including algebra, Spanish, anatomy, chemistry, and U.S. government.

Chin-Kee's academic ability brings to light what Cheryl Gnomes describes as a misguided distinction between "good" stereotypes and "bad" stereotypes. Gnomes mentions that a seemingly "good stereotype" such as Chin-Kee's stellar academic performance is still a negative stereotype overall, because if an Asian student is struggling with a particular academic subject and is believed (and/or expected) to be naturally gifted in the subject, the stereotyped student will feel pressured to perform and fear asking for help.

Chaney argues that the Monkey King serves as a metaphor for minority races and/or ethnicities, particularly those who shun their racial or ethnic backgrounds in order to assimilate into the majority culture. The Monkey King is not allowed into the celestial dinner party because he is a monkey, and therefore inherently inferior in the eyes of the other deities. When he is rejected, he is determined to prove to the world that he is more than just a Monkey, and masters the "four disciplines of invulnerability" in order to become "The Great Sage, Heaven's Equal."

=== Transformation and understanding identity ===
The primary characters of American Born Chinese undergo phases of identity crises that are coupled with some sort of mental or physical transformation(s). Chaney states that the novel "celebrates transformations of identity by way of creaturely alterity. Put another way, Yang's characters become not simply other than what they are, but the other that they are." Transforming toys are introduced very early in the narrative to foreground this theme, and the narrative structure itself transforms in the final act, making this a theme not only of the characters but a key element of the way the story is told.

The Monkey King desires to be recognized as a powerful deity, and more than simply a monkey. Through meditation and practicing Kung-Fu, he is transformed into The Great Sage. Chaney argues that for readers, the use of an animal character like the Monkey King within graphic novels and literature in general allows an understanding of human identity, often more than any other type of character. He argues that the use of an animal character with human characteristics, particularly pathos, simultaneously invokes within the reader the Latin warnings of memento mori and memento bestie ("remember your mortality" and "remember you are animal"). According to Chaney, when characteristics generally considered to be human are given to the Monkey King, readers identify with their human identity more than with the human characters of the novel, such as Jin Wang.

Later in the novel, the Monkey King transforms, or disguises himself into Chin-Kee, Danny's cousin, in order to reveal Danny his true identity as Jin Wang. Fu argues that the Monkey King's transformation into Chin-Kee is a representation of "[t]he legendary trickster figure [that] has been repeatedly re-imagined by Chinese American writers as a source of cultural strength, a symbol of subversion and resistance, and a metaphor for cross-cultural and interracial negotiation." The Monkey King in Yang's version of the classic tale does not use his trickery so much for rebellion as for helping Jin Wang explore and accept himself and identify with his culture.

Jin Wang "struggles to survive exclusion and racist bullying in his search for an identity in a predominantly white suburban school." To deal with his crisis of identity, he transforms himself into "Danny," a white boy who is the protagonist of the third narrative of the novel. Ultimately, his crisis is only deepened when he has to deal the grotesque representation of Chinese stereotypes that his cousin, Chin-Kee displays. Chin-Kee turns out to be the Monkey King. Jin Wang (disguised/transformed into Danny) has been taught to hate about his own culture via racist American stereotypes. When his true identity is revealed, the Monkey King tells Jin Wang that he used the disguise to serve as Jin Wang's conscience, not as a punishment. Ultimately, Jin Wang begins to accept his own identity and dismisses his alter-ego, Danny.

Wei-Chen Sun is actually the Monkey King's eldest son, sent to earth in human form as an emissary for Tze-Yo-Tzuh. His test of virtue is to spend forty years in the mortal world while remaining free of human vice. When he initially arrives to Jin Wang's school he is "presented as a nerdy but fearless recent immigrant from Taiwan." After Jin kisses Suzy Nakamura and Jin and Wei-Chen have a falling out, Wei-Chen transforms into an "angry and despondent Asian American hipster" and gives up his mission for Tze-Yo-Tzuh. Despite Wei-Chen's multiple transformations, hints of his identity as a monkey are subtly and blatantly represented throughout the story. During the scene with Amelia in the biology lab, Wei-Chen has an affinity to the teacher's lipstick-wearing monkey, who will not leave him alone. Wei-Chen can easily recognize that the monkey is actually a male, just as the monkey can actually recognize that Wei-Chen is a monkey himself. When Jin tells Wei-Chen that he has spoken to Wei-Chen's father (the Monkey King), a panel depicting Wei-Chen's true identity as a monkey juxtaposes his hipster human form in the next panel. No matter what transformation Wei-Chen takes, he cannot dismiss his true identity as a monkey.

== Use in schools ==
Gnomes states that American Born Chinese is a great resource to help academically struggling students (particularly struggling readers) and students with social-cognitive disabilities to find motivation to learn, to relate a piece of text to their lives, and to use the graphics to help them understand/relate to the words.

== Television adaptation ==
In 2021, Disney+ ordered a television adaptation of the graphic novel. It was produced by Disney's 20th Television with Kelvin Yu and Charles Yu as writers and executive producers, Melvin Mar and Jake Kasdan as executive producers, and Destin Daniel Cretton as director and executive producer. In February 2022, it was announced that Ben Wang, Michelle Yeoh, Chin Han, Yeo Yann Yann, Daniel Wu, Ke Huy Quan, Jim Liu and Sydney Taylor were cast in the starring roles.

The show premiered on Disney+ on May 24, 2023, with all eight episodes premiering at once to mostly positive reviews.
