= Comics & Cola =

Website

- Website type: Comic book
- Available in: English
- Dissolved: 2022
- Owner: Zainab Akhtar
- Website: comicsandcola.com
- Launched: 2011
- Current status: Inactive

Comics & Cola was a comics website focusing on small-press, independent and self-published comics. It featuring previews, interviews, reviews and news. Owned and written by Zainab Akhtar, the site was nominated in 2014 for an Eisner Award.

== History ==
Founded in 2011, the site moved from general non-fiction prose to articles about comics, primarily small-press and independent works, and was one of the few English-language sites to cover international comics.

Akhtar also wrote articles for The Beat, Forbidden Planet and The Comics Journal. In an interview for The Comics Reporter, she said "It's important to be able to own your work, and it's not helpful ambitions-wise if people aren't even aware you've written it."

In 2013, the site was relaunched with a new layout and header image by Isaac Lenkiewicsz.

Akhtar quit the blog, announced a relaunch in 2017, but abandoned it again in 2022. The site remains defunct as of 2023.

== Awards and nominations ==
- 2014 Eisner Award nomination for "Best Comics-Related Periodical/Journalism"
