= First Second Books =

Graphic novel publisher

- Parent company: Roaring Brook Press (Macmillan Publishers)
- Founded: 2006; 20 years ago
- Country of origin: United States
- Headquarters location: Equitable Building, New York City
- Distribution: Worldwide
- Key people: Mark Siegel
- Publication types: Graphic novels
- Official website: Official website

First Second Books is an American publisher of graphic novels. An imprint of Roaring Brook Press, part of Holtzbrinck Publishers, First Second publishes fiction, biographies, personal memoirs, history, visual essays, and comics journalism. It also publishes graphic non-fiction for young readers, including the Science Comics and History Comics collections, and for adults, including the World Citizen Comics, a line of civics graphic books, and biographical works such as The Accidental Czar.

Authors and artists published by First Second include Ben Hatke, Gene Luen Yang, Jillian Tamaki, Vera Brosgol, Jen Wang, Shannon Hale, LeUyen Pham, Scott Chantler, and Japanese director Hayao Miyazaki.

First Second is headed by creative director Mark Siegel.

== History ==
First Second launched in U.S. stores and online in May 2006. It was distributed by Macmillan in the rest of the English-speaking world. After the merger in 2010, Macmillan distributes all of the books.

In 2006, First Second published American Born Chinese by Gene Luen Yang, the first graphic novel ever nominated for a National Book Award, and the first ever to win the American Library Association's Michael L. Printz Award.

In 2015, First Second published This One Summer by cousins Jillian and Mariko Tamaki, the first book in any format ever nominated as a finalist for both the American Library Association's Randolph Caldecott Award, and the American Library Association's Edward L. Printz Award.

In 2024, First Second launched 23rd Street Books, an imprint for adult-oriented graphic novels.

== Series ==
Some of First Second's biggest hits include the InvestiGators series and the Real Friends trilogy.

Series published by First Second include:

- The Adventure Zone graphic novel series
- The Dam Keeper by Robert Kondo and Daisuke Tsutsumi
- Delilah Dirk, by Tony Cliff
- Demon, by Jason Shiga
- Cucumber Quest, by Gigi D.G.

== Selected titles ==
=== Before 2010 ===
- Abadzis, Nick (2007). Laika.
- Guibert, Emmanuel (2008). Alan's War: The Memories of G.I. Alan Cope.
- Guibert, Emmanuel; Lefèvre, Didier; Lemercier, Frédéric (2009). The Photographer.
- Mechner, Jordan; Sina, A.B.; Pham, LeUyen; Puvilland, Alex (2008). Prince of Persia.
- Sfar, Joann; Guibert, Emmanuel (2006–2008). Sardine in Outer Space.
- Sfar, Joann; Guibert, Emmanuel (2007). The Professor's Daughter.
- Yang, Gene Luen (2006). American Born Chinese.

=== 2010s ===
- Anya's Ghost by Vera Brosgol
- Friends with Boys by Faith Erin Hicks
- Boxers and Saints by Gene Luen Yang
- The Cute Girl Network, by Greg Means and M. K. Reed, with art by Joe Flood
- This One Summer by Mariko Tamaki and Jillian Tamaki
- The Divine by Boaz Lavie, Asaf Hanuka, Tomer Hanuka
- Spinning by Tillie Walden
- The Hunting Accident by David Carlson and Landis Blair
- Check, Please!: #Hockey by Ngozi Ukazu
- Speak by Laurie Halse Anderson and E. M. Carroll
- The Prince and the Dressmaker by Jen Wang
- Laura Dean Keeps Breaking Up with Me by Mariko Tamaki
- Kiss Number 8 by Colleen A. F. Venable

=== 2020s ===
- Dragon Hoops by Gene Luen Yang
