= List of webcomics with LGBTQ characters =

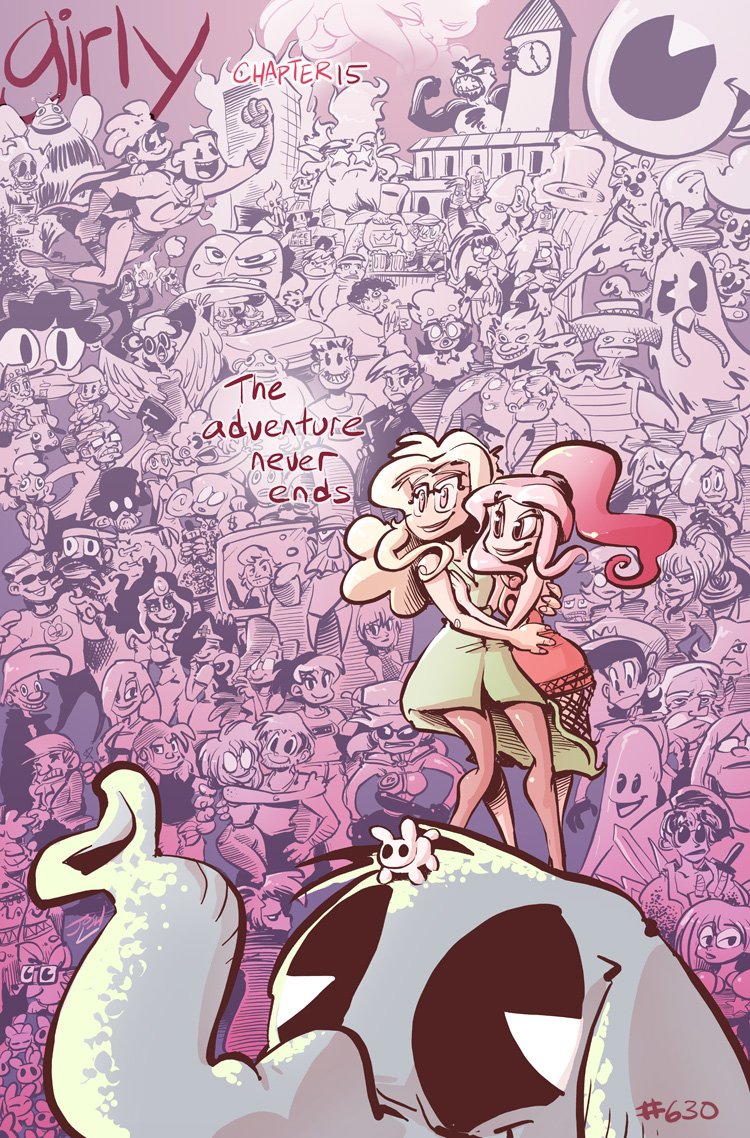
Girly (2003–2010)

Many webcomics feature lesbian, gay, bisexual, transgender, or otherwise LGBTQ+ characters and themes. Such content was historically omitted intentionally from the content of comic strips and comic books due to censorship, the perception that LGBTQ+ representation was inappropriate for children, or the perception that comics as a medium were for children. In recent years, the number of LGBTQ+ characters in mainstream comics has increased greatly. Many openly gay and lesbian comic creators self-publish their work on the Internet. These include amateur works, as well as more "mainstream" works, such as Kyle's Bed & Breakfast. According to Andrew Wheeler from ComicsAlliance, webcomics "provide a platform to so many queer voices that might otherwise go undiscovered".

== 1980s–1990s ==
Year(s)	Title	Character(s)	Identity	Description	Created by
1983–2008, 2016–2018	Dykes to Watch Out For	Mo Testa	Lesbian	This webcomic features multiple lesbian characters, including a principled lesbian named Mo Testa who graduates from library school.	Alison Bechdel
1983–2008, 2016–2018	Dykes to Watch Out For	Lois MacGiver	Lesbian	Lois is a drag king who dates Jasmine and is dedicated to trans rights; she is the mother of a trans teen named Janis.	Alison Bechdel
1983–2008, 2016–2018	Dykes to Watch Out For	Clarice Clifford	Lesbian	College girlfriend of Mo and married partner of Toni Ortiz; an environmental lawyer.	Alison Bechdel
1983–2008, 2016–2018	Dykes to Watch Out For	Toni Ortiz	Lesbian	Married partner of Clarice and an advocate of the freedom to marry.	Alison Bechdel
1983–2008, 2016–2018	Dykes to Watch Out For	Dr. Sydney Krukowski	Lesbian	Current lover of Mo Testa.	Alison Bechdel
1983–2008, 2016–2018	Dykes to Watch Out For	Thea	Lesbian	Lover of Sydney Krukowski in college.	Alison Bechdel
1983–2008, 2016–2018	Dykes to Watch Out For	Jezanna	Lesbian	In a relationship with Audrey; she had a bookstore named Madwimmin Books that closed due to the opening of a "Bounders Books and Musak" store nearby.	Alison Bechdel
1983–2008, 2016–2018	Dykes to Watch Out For	Audrey	Lesbian	In a relationship with Audrey; she had a bookstore named Madwimmin Books that closed due to the opening of a "Bounders Books and Musak" store nearby.	Alison Bechdel
1983–2008, 2016–2018	Dykes to Watch Out For	Harriet	Lesbian	Ex-girlfriend of Mo.	Alison Bechdel
1983–2008, 2016–2018	Dykes to Watch Out For	Sparrow Pidgeon	Bisexual	Director of a shelter for those suffering from domestic violence.	Alison Bechdel
1983–2008, 2016–2018	Dykes to Watch Out For	Janis	Trans woman	Trans adolescent daughter of Jasmine.	Alison Bechdel
1996–2007	Bruno	Bruno	Bisexual	The titular character, Bruno, is a bisexual, and free-spirited woman. In one comic, Bruno admits her bisexuality, and in others, she goes on a date with Frank, has a one-night-stand with Patricia, and has sex with her friend Donna.	Christopher Baldwin
1996–2007	Bruno	Donna	Lesbian	Bruno and Donna have a passionate relationship, but due to Bruno's alcoholism and somewhat turbulent personality, they break up. After the breakup, Bruno expresses interest in a boy and Donna is seen with a new girlfriend.	Christopher Baldwin
1996–2007	Bruno	Sophia	Lesbian	Bruno later becomes involves with Sophia, who "has male and female lovers within the bounds of a polyamorous relationship."	Christopher Baldwin
1996–2007	Bruno	Judi	Trans woman	In the comic, Baldwin offers "brief flashes inside Judi's private sexual life," even though most of the main characters don't know she is trans.	Christopher Baldwin
1998–2018	Jane's World	Jane Wyatt	Lesbian	In this "gay-themed comic strip," most of the central characters, are lesbians, including the titular Jane Wyatt, who has a crush on the owner of the coffee shop, Margaret "Maggie" Valen. The comic's creator, Paige Braddock told AfterEllen that for Jane's character to come out, she had to do the same, and she did so when she moved to California.	Paige Braddock
1998–2018	Jane's World	Margaret "Maggie" Valen	Lesbian	Maggie has a number of ex (and current) girlfriends. She may have feelings for Dorothy.	Paige Braddock
1998–2018	Jane's World	Dorothy	Bisexual	Confirmed as a bisexual character, she may have feelings for Maggie and Jane seems to have feelings for her as well. Bisexual women are also included as characters, and the comic later featured a same-sex marriage between some of the comic's central characters in 2018.	Paige Braddock
1998–present	Kyle's Bed & Breakfast	Jeff Olsen	Gay	Olsen is a gay man with HIV. Comic covers topics such as same-sex marriage, HIV/AIDS, body fascism and conversion therapy.	Greg Fox
1998–present	Kyle's Bed & Breakfast	Mark Masterson	Gay	Masterson is a gay scholar.	Greg Fox
1998–present	Kyle's Bed & Breakfast	Kristian Janson	Gay	Janson is a Jamaican gay man.	Greg Fox
1999–present	Real Life Comics	Mae Dean	Trans Woman / Lesbian	Mae is a trans woman, based on the author of the comic, Maelyn Dean. Prior to June 2020, when a storyline revealed the character was trans feminine (and had been the entire time), this character was called "Greg".	Maelyn Dean

== 2000s ==
=== 2000–2004 ===
Year(s)	Title	Character(s)	Identity	Description	Created by
2001–2014	Venus Envy	Zoë Alexis Carter	Trans woman	The protagonist of this webcomic, she adjusts to school life as a girl and has severe depression. She is bisexual like her friend Nina.	Crystal Frasier
2001–2014	Venus Envy	Larson Delgado	Trans man	A trans Latino boy who is, like Lisa, friends with Zoë, going to the same high school; he often wears chest binders.	Crystal Frasier
2001–2014	Venus Envy	Lisa van Gogh	Lesbian	Friends with Zoë and is on the soccer team, which is filled with other lesbians.	Crystal Frasier
2001–2014	Venus Envy	Nina dell' Abade	Bisexual	A friend of Zoë who is a theatre kid	Crystal Frasier
2002–2009	Oh My Gods!	Stan	Gay	Includes gay main characters such as Stan (who is in a relationship with Vincent) and a lesbian named Vera, in this story which deals with the Neopagan, Pagan, and Wiccan faiths.	Shivian Balaris
2002–2009	Oh My Gods!	Vera	Lesbian	Includes gay main characters such as Stan (who is in a relationship with Vincent) and a lesbian named Vera, in this story which deals with the Neopagan, Pagan, and Wiccan faiths.	Shivian Balaris
2003–2010	Girly	Otra	Lesbian	This webcomic is the sequel to Cutewendy, with two female protagonists (Otra and Winter) in a romantic relationship with one of them having lesbian parents.	Jackie Lesnick
2003–2010	Girly	Winter	Lesbian	This webcomic is the sequel to Cutewendy, with two female protagonists (Otra and Winter) in a romantic relationship with one of them having lesbian parents.	Jackie Lesnick
2002–present	El Goonish Shive	Sarah Brown	Bisexual	In a pair of Q&A strips and accompanying commentary in 2019, Shive described "the entire main cast and a lot of others" as LGBT+ and stated that "gender fluidity and bisexuality feel normal and like the default to [him]" and that he "grew up in the eighties and nineties wanting to see more LGBT+ characters"	Dan Shive
2002–present	El Goonish Shive	Tiffany Susan Pompoms	Bisexual	In a pair of Q&A strips and accompanying commentary in 2019, Shive described "the entire main cast and a lot of others" as LGBT+ and stated that "gender fluidity and bisexuality feel normal and like the default to [him]" and that he "grew up in the eighties and nineties wanting to see more LGBT+ characters"	Dan Shive
2002–present	El Goonish Shive	Diane	Bisexual	In a pair of Q&A strips and accompanying commentary in 2019, Shive described "the entire main cast and a lot of others" as LGBT+ and stated that "gender fluidity and bisexuality feel normal and like the default to [him]" and that he "grew up in the eighties and nineties wanting to see more LGBT+ characters"	Dan Shive
2002–present	El Goonish Shive	Rhoda	Bisexual	In a pair of Q&A strips and accompanying commentary in 2019, Shive described "the entire main cast and a lot of others" as LGBT+ and stated that "gender fluidity and bisexuality feel normal and like the default to [him]" and that he "grew up in the eighties and nineties wanting to see more LGBT+ characters"	Dan Shive
2002–present	El Goonish Shive	Ashley	Attracted to both boys & girls	In a pair of Q&A strips and accompanying commentary in 2019, Shive described "the entire main cast and a lot of others" as LGBT+ and stated that "gender fluidity and bisexuality feel normal and like the default to [him]" and that he "grew up in the eighties and nineties wanting to see more LGBT+ characters"	Dan Shive
2002–present	El Goonish Shive	Grace Sciuridae	Demisexual	In a pair of Q&A strips and accompanying commentary in 2019, Shive described "the entire main cast and a lot of others" as LGBT+ and stated that "gender fluidity and bisexuality feel normal and like the default to [him]" and that he "grew up in the eighties and nineties wanting to see more LGBT+ characters"	Dan Shive
2002–present	El Goonish Shive	Justin Tolkiberry	Gay	In a pair of Q&A strips and accompanying commentary in 2019, Shive described "the entire main cast and a lot of others" as LGBT+ and stated that "gender fluidity and bisexuality feel normal and like the default to [him]" and that he "grew up in the eighties and nineties wanting to see more LGBT+ characters"	Dan Shive
2002–present	El Goonish Shive	George	Gay	In a pair of Q&A strips and accompanying commentary in 2019, Shive described "the entire main cast and a lot of others" as LGBT+ and stated that "gender fluidity and bisexuality feel normal and like the default to [him]" and that he "grew up in the eighties and nineties wanting to see more LGBT+ characters"	Dan Shive
2002–present	El Goonish Shive	Luke	Gay	In a pair of Q&A strips and accompanying commentary in 2019, Shive described "the entire main cast and a lot of others" as LGBT+ and stated that "gender fluidity and bisexuality feel normal and like the default to [him]" and that he "grew up in the eighties and nineties wanting to see more LGBT+ characters"	Dan Shive
2002–present	El Goonish Shive	Elliot Daniel Dunkel	Gender 'Casual'	In a pair of Q&A strips and accompanying commentary in 2019, Shive described "the entire main cast and a lot of others" as LGBT+ and stated that "gender fluidity and bisexuality feel normal and like the default to [him]" and that he "grew up in the eighties and nineties wanting to see more LGBT+ characters"	Dan Shive
2002–present	El Goonish Shive	Tedd Drew Verres	Genderfluid	In a pair of Q&A strips and accompanying commentary in 2019, Shive described "the entire main cast and a lot of others" as LGBT+ and stated that "gender fluidity and bisexuality feel normal and like the default to [him]" and that he "grew up in the eighties and nineties wanting to see more LGBT+ characters"	Dan Shive
2002–present	El Goonish Shive	Nanase Kitsune	Lesbian	In a pair of Q&A strips and accompanying commentary in 2019, Shive described "the entire main cast and a lot of others" as LGBT+ and stated that "gender fluidity and bisexuality feel normal and like the default to [him]" and that he "grew up in the eighties and nineties wanting to see more LGBT+ characters"	Dan Shive
2002–present	El Goonish Shive	Lucy	Lesbian	In a pair of Q&A strips and accompanying commentary in 2019, Shive described "the entire main cast and a lot of others" as LGBT+ and stated that "gender fluidity and bisexuality feel normal and like the default to [him]" and that he "grew up in the eighties and nineties wanting to see more LGBT+ characters"	Dan Shive
2002–present	El Goonish Shive	Catalina Bobcat	Lesbian	In a pair of Q&A strips and accompanying commentary in 2019, Shive described "the entire main cast and a lot of others" as LGBT+ and stated that "gender fluidity and bisexuality feel normal and like the default to [him]" and that he "grew up in the eighties and nineties wanting to see more LGBT+ characters"	Dan Shive
2002–present	El Goonish Shive	Jay	Lesbian	In a pair of Q&A strips and accompanying commentary in 2019, Shive described "the entire main cast and a lot of others" as LGBT+ and stated that "gender fluidity and bisexuality feel normal and like the default to [him]" and that he "grew up in the eighties and nineties wanting to see more LGBT+ characters"	Dan Shive
2002–present	El Goonish Shive	Sam	Trans man	In a pair of Q&A strips and accompanying commentary in 2019, Shive described "the entire main cast and a lot of others" as LGBT+ and stated that "gender fluidity and bisexuality feel normal and like the default to [him]" and that he "grew up in the eighties and nineties wanting to see more LGBT+ characters"	Dan Shive
2002–present	El Goonish Shive	Vladia	Trans woman	In a pair of Q&A strips and accompanying commentary in 2019, Shive described "the entire main cast and a lot of others" as LGBT+ and stated that "gender fluidity and bisexuality feel normal and like the default to [him]" and that he "grew up in the eighties and nineties wanting to see more LGBT+ characters"	Dan Shive
2002–present	El Goonish Shive	Ellen Danielle Dunkel	Trans woman Bisexual homoromantic	In a pair of Q&A strips and accompanying commentary in 2019, Shive described "the entire main cast and a lot of others" as LGBT+ and stated that "gender fluidity and bisexuality feel normal and like the default to [him]" and that he "grew up in the eighties and nineties wanting to see more LGBT+ characters"	Dan Shive
2003–present	Questionable Content	Claire Augustus	Trans woman	Includes characters of various sexualities – a trans woman named Claire; an asexual character named Hannelore; a bisexual woman named Dora who is in a relationship with a lesbian woman named Tai; a gay man named Henry; and a professional dominatrix named Veronica – as well as various other themes of sexuality. Faye, who had previously only expressed sexual attraction to men, enters into a relationship with a female-presenting robot named Bubbles. Two bisexual male characters, Clinton and Elliot, are in a relationship with each other.	Jeph Jacques
2003–present	Questionable Content	Hannelore Ellicott-Chatham	Asexual		Jeph Jacques
2003–present	Questionable Content	Dora Bianchi	Bisexual		Jeph Jacques
2003–present	Questionable Content	Faye Whitaker	Bisexual		Jeph Jacques
2003–present	Questionable Content	Clinton Augustus	Bisexual		Jeph Jacques
2003–present	Questionable Content	Elliot	Bisexual		Jeph Jacques
2003–present	Questionable Content	Tai Hubbert	Lesbian		Jeph Jacques
2003–present	Questionable Content	Bubbles	Lesbian		Jeph Jacques
2003–present	Questionable Content	Henry Reed	Gay		Jeph Jacques
2004–2015	Girls With Slingshots	Thea	Lesbian	This webcomic, by Danielle Corsetto, focuses on the adventures of Jaime, Hazel, and their friends, and at one point "Thea and Angel have the safe lesbian sex talk." Corsetto also leads the readers through the "wonderful world of sex with girls," reminding readers that "sexuality comes in a number of flavors."	Danielle Corsetto
2004–2015	Girls With Slingshots	Angel	Lesbian	This webcomic, by Danielle Corsetto, focuses on the adventures of Jaime, Hazel, and their friends, and at one point "Thea and Angel have the safe lesbian sex talk." Corsetto also leads the readers through the "wonderful world of sex with girls," reminding readers that "sexuality comes in a number of flavors."	Danielle Corsetto

=== 2005–2009 ===
Year(s)	Title	Character(s)	Identity	Description	Created by
2005–present	Gunnerkrigg Court	Kat	Lesbian	Features various LGBT characters, including Kat and Paz as a same-sex couple, as well as Zimmy and Gamma, Robot and Shadow.	Tom Siddell
2005–present	Gunnerkrigg Court	Paz	Lesbian	Features various LGBT characters, including Kat and Paz as a same-sex couple, as well as Zimmy and Gamma, Robot and Shadow.	Tom Siddell
2005–present	Gunnerkrigg Court	Zimmy	Lesbian	Features various LGBT characters, including Kat and Paz as a same-sex couple, as well as Zimmy and Gamma, Robot and Shadow.	Tom Siddell
2005–present	Gunnerkrigg Court	Gamma	Lesbian	Features various LGBT characters, including Kat and Paz as a same-sex couple, as well as Zimmy and Gamma, Robot and Shadow.	Tom Siddell
2005–present	Gunnerkrigg Court	Robot	Gay	Features various LGBT characters, including Kat and Paz as a same-sex couple, as well as Zimmy and Gamma, Robot and Shadow.	Tom Siddell
2005–present	Gunnerkrigg Court	Shadow	Gay	Features various LGBT characters, including Kat and Paz as a same-sex couple, as well as Zimmy and Gamma, Robot and Shadow.	Tom Siddell
2008–2019	Ménage à 3	Suzi "Zii" Nielsen	Bisexual	Explores "themes of sexual awakening" The webcomic follows the lives and adventures of three roommates in their attempts to find love, success and the pleasures of life. One of these roommates is Suzi "Zii" Nielsen, who is bisexual,	Gisele Lagace; Dave Lumsdon
2008–2019	Ménage à 3	Désirée "Didi" Chastel	Bisexual	A roommate of Zii, Désirée "Didi" Chastel is bisexual.	Gisele Lagace; Dave Lumsdon
2008–2019	Ménage à 3	Yuki Ōyama	Bisexual	Yuki is bisexual but has phallophobia so generally is not intimate with men.	Gisele Lagace; Dave Lumsdon
2008–2019	Ménage à 3	Matthieu "Matt" Lanteigne	Bisexual	Matt is bisexual and is shown in relationships with men and women.	Gisele Lagace; Dave Lumsdon
2008–2019	Ménage à 3	Senna Muniz	Trans woman	A roommate of Didi and Zii, Senna is a trans lingerie model She later gets dumped by Gary.	Gisele Lagace; Dave Lumsdon
2008–2019	Ménage à 3	Dillon	Gay	A gay man who is the protagonist of a spinoff comic titled Sticky Dilly Buns.	Gisele Lagace; Dave Lumsdon
2008–Present	Oglaf	Ivan	Possibly bisexual	Explores various sexual themes and includes a person named Ivan, along with various other characters. Specifically, Ivan has sex with various men, women, and a mistress; he having sperm enchanted by said mistress, named Sprite. The comic also includes two succubi who have sex with each other; kissing male zombies; masturbation; oral sex; and lesbian sex of unnamed characters.	Trudy Cooper
2008–Present	Oglaf	Other characters	Gay	Explores various sexual themes and includes a person named Ivan, along with various other characters. Specifically, Ivan has sex with various men, women, and a mistress; he having sperm enchanted by said mistress, named Sprite. The comic also includes two succubi who have sex with each other; kissing male zombies; masturbation; oral sex; and lesbian sex of unnamed characters.	Trudy Cooper
2008–Present	Oglaf	Other characters	Lesbian	Explores various sexual themes and includes a person named Ivan, along with various other characters. Specifically, Ivan has sex with various men, women, and a mistress; he having sperm enchanted by said mistress, named Sprite. The comic also includes two succubi who have sex with each other; kissing male zombies; masturbation; oral sex; and lesbian sex of unnamed characters.	Trudy Cooper
2009–2016	Homestuck	Kanaya Maryam	Lesbian	Kanaya attempts to court female friends, and eventually dates and marries Rose.	Andrew Hussie
2009–2016	Homestuck	Rose Lalonde	Lesbian	Rose engages in a complex courtship ritual with Kanaya, and eventually dates and then marries her.	Andrew Hussie
2009–2016	Homestuck	Calliope	Ambiguous	These siblings are members of a sexually monomorphic species, and thus don't naturally express gender identity. In interacting with human and troll culture, they begin expressing themselves in gendered terms.	Andrew Hussie
2009–2016	Homestuck	Caliborn	Ambiguous	These siblings are members of a sexually monomorphic species, and thus don't naturally express gender identity. In interacting with human and troll culture, they begin expressing themselves in gendered terms.	Andrew Hussie
2009–2016	Homestuck	Davepetasprite^2	Non-binary	Davepetasprite^2 is the fusion of a former male and female, and they are identified as they/them.	Andrew Hussie
2009–2016	Homestuck	Dirk Strider	Gay	Dirk, although rejecting the label on the basis of it being antiquated, states discomfort when propositioned by Roxy, and develops a convoluted courtship plot to woo male friend Jake.	Andrew Hussie
2009–2016	Homestuck	Jake English	Bisexual	Jake is shown to have interest in women, and dates Dirk for a time.	Andrew Hussie
2009–2016	Homestuck	Various	Bisexual	The alien race known as Trolls are predominately bisexual.	Andrew Hussie
2009-2020	Doc and Raider	Doc	Gay	Focuses on two gay men, Doc and Raider, originally in newspapers from 1987 to 1997, Published in newspapers and magazines for LGBT audiences beginning in 1987, then as a webcomic from 2009 to 2020.	Sean Martin
2009-2020	Doc and Raider	Raider	Gay	Focuses on two gay men, Doc and Raider, originally in newspapers from 1987 to 1997, Published in newspapers and magazines for LGBT audiences beginning in 1987, then as a webcomic from 2009 to 2020.	Sean Martin
2009 - 2015	The Less Than Epic Adventures of TJ & Amal	Amal	Gay	One evening, Amal calls off his arranged marriage and comes out to his parents, but is disowned by them. The next morning, a boy named TJ is in his kitchen, and both decide to go on a road trip.	E.K. Weaver
2009 - 2015	The Less Than Epic Adventures of TJ & Amal	TJ	Gay	One evening, Amal calls off his arranged marriage and comes out to his parents, but is disowned by them. The next morning, a boy named TJ is in his kitchen, and both decide to go on a road trip.	E.K. Weaver

== 2010s ==
=== 2010–2014 ===
Year(s)	Title	Character(s)	Identity	Description	Created by
2010–present	Dumbing of Age	Jennifer "Billie" Billingsworth	Bisexual	Large cast of characters attending college with various sexual orientations and gender identities. This includes Jennifer "Billie" Billingsworth who had a tempestuous relationship with her RA Ruth Lessick and then began dating a boy named Asher.	David M Willis
2010–present	Dumbing of Age	Becky MacIntyre	Lesbian	Becky had an unrequited crush upon her childhood friend Joyce Brown and is now dating Dina Saruyama.	David M Willis
2010–present	Dumbing of Age	Dina Saruyama	Gray-ace	Dina is not strongly inclined to sexual feelings, but she is more open to the possibility of making their relationship sexual than her partner Becky is, due to the latter's Evangelical Christian upbringing.	David M Willis
2010–present	Dumbing of Age	Ethan Siegal	Gay	Ethan Siegal had sexual tension with his friend Danny Wilcox, leading Danny to discover he is bisexual.	David M Willis
2010–present	Dumbing of Age	Leslie	Lesbian	Leslie is a gender studies professor and a mentor to Becky.	David M Willis
2010–present	Dumbing of Age	Malaya Eugenio	Ambiguous	Malaya is still figuring out their gender identity.	David M Willis
2010–present	Dumbing of Age	Carla Rutten	Trans	Carla is an engineering wunderkind with an affection for rollerskates.	David M Willis
2010–present	Dumbing of Age	Booster Sanchez	Non-binary	Booster, introduced after the timeskip to the second semester, is a psychology major and photography hobbyist.	David M Willis
2010–present	Dumbing of Age	Jocelyne Brown	Trans Woman	Jocelyne is Joyce's older sister and an author.	David M Willis
2010–present	Dumbing of Age	Dorothy Keener	Bisexual	Dorothy has a crush on Joyce, which made her come to terms with her bisexuality.	David M Willis
2010–present	Unsounded	Roger Foi-Hellick	Gay	Features several characters shown involved in gay relationships. The most prominent example is Roger Foi-Hellick, shown to have previously had a male lover as well as not being interested in intimate relationships with women.	Ashley Cope
2010–present	Go Get a Roomie!	Roommie	Bisexual or pansexual	Explores sexual themes. The protagonist is a free-spirited and sexually active young woman who goes by the nickname of "Roomie"; her real name is as yet unknown. Roomie lives on no apparent income by staying with various friends and partners, with most of the comic's material prior to chapter 14 stemming from such ventures, particularly in the first two chapters. She has described herself as "not the romantic type," although she has close relations with Lillian, her roommate as shown on various occasions, and she has said she has been sexual with men and women, implying she may be bisexual or pansexual.	Chloé C
2010–present	Go Get a Roomie!	Jak	Trans boi	Jak is a "transboi friend" who has a girlfriend named Gulden.	Chloé C
2010–present	Go Get a Roomie!	Aggie	Intersex	Aggie was Roomie's past lover who was born intersex as she stated in a radio interview.	Chloé C
2010–2022	Rain	Rain	Trans woman	This comic features a trans girl, Rain, as the main character and other LGBT+ characters. The author has stated that her goal is to include at least one of every LGBT identity.	Jocelyn Samara DiDomenick
2010–2022	Rain	Fara Bryer	Bisexual	A bisexual woman.	Jocelyn Samara DiDomenick
2010–2022	Rain	Maria Strongwell	Lesbian	A lesbian woman.	Jocelyn Samara DiDomenick
2010–2022	Rain	Rudy Strongwell	Gay	A gay man.	Jocelyn Samara DiDomenick
2010–2022	Rain	Chanel Montoya	Asexual	An asexual woman.	Jocelyn Samara DiDomenick
2011–2012	Bucko	Gyp	Lesbian	This webcomic features an "uninhibited" lesbian main character who is the housemate of the protagonist, Rich "Bucko" Richardson.	Jeff Parker; Erika Moen
2011–present	Cucumber Quest	Peridot	Lesbian	This comic features two girls, Peridot and Almond, who have crushes on each other, and a complex trans woman character named Rosemaster, who is a villain in this story.	Gigi D.G.
2011–present	Cucumber Quest	Almond	Lesbian	This comic features two girls, Peridot and Almond, who have crushes on each other, and a complex trans woman character named Rosemaster, who is a villain in this story.	Gigi D.G.
2011–present	Sunstone	Ally	Lesbian	Focuses on the BDSM relationship between two women, domme Ally and sub Lisa.	Stjepan Šejić
2011–present	Sunstone	Lisa	Lesbian	Focuses on the BDSM relationship between two women, domme Ally and sub Lisa.	Stjepan Šejić
2012–2015	Nimona	Nimona	Butch lesbian	The series protagonist, Nimona, is a stocky woman and shapeshifter, who wears pink and is "kind of butch." Nimona is a sidekick of villainous Lord Ballister Blackheart, with both fighting the Institution of Law Enforcement and Heroics. Blackheart's former lover and childhood friend, Sir Goldenloin, is a member of the institute.	ND Stevenson
2012–present	Kate or Die	Kate	Bisexual	Covers issues including bisexuality and feminism, in occasionally autobiographical issues.	Kate Leth
2012–present	Kill Six Billion Demons	Allison Ruth	Bisexual	Allison has romantic and sexual relationships with both Zaid, a human man, and Cio, a female-presenting devil, at different points in the comic.	Tom Parkinson-Morgan
2012–present	Kill Six Billion Demons	Ciocie Cioelle	Bisexual	Cio has dated and married male-presenting devils in the past and has a romantic and sexual relationship with Allison, a human woman, later in the comic.	Tom Parkinson-Morgan
2012–present	Kill Six Billion Demons	Incubus	Gay	Parkinson-Morgan has stated that he is "pretty sure Incubus is gay, but he's gay for ambition the most of all."	Tom Parkinson-Morgan
2012–present	Kill Six Billion Demons	White Chain	Trans woman	White Chain transitions to using she/her pronouns over the course of the comic and takes the form of a human female after her apotheosis, contrasting with the majority of angels, who while technically genderless default to masculine presentation and consider other forms of gender presentation to be "human" traits.	Tom Parkinson-Morgan
2012–present	O Human Star	Brendan	Gay	Main characters include gay men, Brendan and Al, and a MtF trans robot named Sulla.	Blue Delliquanti
2012–present	O Human Star	Al	Gay	Main characters include gay men, Brendan and Al, and a MtF trans robot named Sulla.	Blue Delliquanti
2012–present	O Human Star	Sula	Trans woman	Main characters include gay men, Brendan and Al, and a MtF trans robot named Sulla.	Blue Delliquanti
2013–2020	Check, Please!	Eric "Bitty" Bittle	Gay	Centers around a gay protagonist, Eric "Bitty" Bittle, on a college hockey team.	Ngozi Ukazu
2013–2020	Check, Please!	Jack Zimmerman	Unspecified	Has a romantic relationship with Bitty and a past relationship with Kent Parson. Also had relationships with women in the past.	Ngozi Ukazu
2013–2020	Check, Please!	Kent Parson	Unspecified	Had a romantic relationship with Jack as teenagers.	Ngozi Ukazu
2013–2020	Check, Please!	Connor "Whiskey" Whisk	Unspecified	Bitty's teammate in years 3 and 4 of the comics who has a girlfriend, but is seen kissing another boy. Near the end of the comic, he tells Bitty that he's still figuring himself out.	Ngozi Ukazu
2013–2020	Check, Please!	Shruti	Lesbian	Samwell women's rugby captain and a friend of Bitty's who is open about being a lesbian.	Ngozi Ukazu
2013–2020	Check, Please!	Edgar	Gay	Samwell men's volleyball captain who is mentioned to be gay.	Ngozi Ukazu
2013–2020	Check, Please!	Ollie O'Meara	Gay	One of Bitty's teammates who is revealed to have married teammate Pacer "Wicky" Wicks after graduation in the comics extras.	Ngozi Ukazu
2013–2020	Check, Please!	Pacer "Wicky" Wicks	Gay	One of Bitty's teammates who is revealed to have married teammate Ollie O'Meara after graduation in the comics extras.	Ngozi Ukazu
2013–present	Trans Girl Next Door	Kylie Wu	Trans woman	Autobiographical comic about the author's transition as a transgender woman.	Kylie Wu
2013–present	Up and Out	Julia Kaye	Trans woman	This autobiographical comic is about the author's transition as a transgender woman.	Julia Kaye
2014–2020	Lumberjanes	Mal	Lesbian or bisexual	This series features various LGBTQ characters. Two campers, Mal and Molly, discover they have mutual crushes for each other, with their friends accepting their relationship.	Grace Ellis; Shannon Watters (Note: Apart from writing by Ellis and Watters, ND Stevenson, Kat Leyh, and Faith Erin Hicks wrote stories for this series.)
2014–2020	Lumberjanes	Molly	Lesbian or bisexual	This series features various LGBTQ characters. Two campers, Mal and Molly, discover they have mutual crushes for each other, with their friends accepting their relationship.	Grace Ellis; Shannon Watters
2014–2020	Lumberjanes	Jo	Trans woman	Jo is a trans woman of color with two dads, and acts as an "expert on what it means to be a Lumberjane" to the fellow campers.	Grace Ellis; Shannon Watters
2014–2020	Lumberjanes	Artemis	Asexual	In issue #68, when Artemis confesses her love for Diane, she says: "...I like you too. But I don't have any interest in kissing or junk like that" and has never had an interest in kissing anyone.	Grace Ellis; Shannon Watters
2014–present	Agents of the Realm	Norah Tanner	Bisexual	Features a predominantly Black main cast with a variety of sexual orientations, with the story focusing on the "vibrant transformation of five young women into interdimensional warriors," such as a Black woman named Norah Tanner, and four others: Adele, Kendall, Paige, and Jordan. Norah specifically is attracted to a woman dressed as Snow White and a man dressed as Tuxedo Mask from Sailor Moon.	Mildred Louis
2014–present	Assigned Male	Stephie	Trans woman	This comic follows life through the eyes of a middle schooler named Stephie who alternately makes light of, and chafes under the realities of growing up a transgender child in a cisgender world. It also features a non-binary girl named Ciel, a trans girl named Brianna, and three trans men (Ryder, Aidan, and Myrick), with Ryder calling himself a "gender smoothie." This long-running webomic counters "misconceptions about transgender people," with Stephie and Ciel exploring their "gender identity, relationships, and just life in general." It has been published under the name "Serious Trans Vibes" on Webtoon.	Sophie Labelle
2014–present	Assigned Male	Ciel	Non-binary		Sophie Labelle
2014–present	Assigned Male	Brianna	Trans woman		Sophie Labelle
2014–present	Assigned Male	Ryder	Trans man		Sophie Labelle
2014–present	Assigned Male	Aidan	Trans man		Sophie Labelle
2014–present	Assigned Male	Myrick	Trans man		Sophie Labelle
2014–present	Eth's Skin	Eth	Non-binary	Follows the adventures of a non-binary fisherman living in British Columbia, Canada.	Sfé R. Monster
2014–present	Rock Cocks	Elizabeth	Bisexual	Features the NSFW adventures of traveling rockstars and their roadies on a quest for fame.	Leslie Brown
2014–present	Rock Cocks	Coral	Lesbian	Features the NSFW adventures of traveling rockstars and their roadies on a quest for fame.	Leslie Brown
2014–present	Rock Cocks	Dakota	Trans man	Features the NSFW adventures of traveling rockstars and their roadies on a quest for fame.	Leslie Brown
2014–present	Rock Cocks	Seth	Gay	Features the NSFW adventures of traveling rockstars and their roadies on a quest for fame.	Leslie Brown
2014–present	Witchy	Prill	Trans woman	This comic features a trans girl named Prill, a witch who is in the main character Nyneve's class. Prill is introduced as a bully, and later becomes an ally.	Ariel Ries

=== 2015–2019 ===
Year(s)	Title	Character(s)	Identity	Description	Created by
2015–2020	Hooky	Damien Wytte	Gay	The webcomic features a relationship between male witch Damien Wytte and a prince named William. Will begins the story betrothed to, and in love with, a princess named Monica.	Míriam Bonastre Tur
2015–2020	Hooky	William	Bisexual	The webcomic features a relationship between male witch Damien Wytte and a prince named William. Will begins the story betrothed to, and in love with, a princess named Monica.	Míriam Bonastre Tur
2015–present	Never Satisfied	Lucy Marlowe	Non-binary	Features a varied LGBT cast, such as a non-binary teenager and one-eyed apprentice, named Lucy Marlowe, and others within the diverse cast, some of whom are also non-binary. The latter may refer to characters Tetsu and Rascal, who both use they/them pronouns.	Taylor Robin
2016	My Lesbian Experience With Loneliness	Kabi Nagata	Lesbian	Autobiographical manga by a lesbian author.	Kabi Nagata
2016–2017	On a Sunbeam	Mia	Lesbian	Later turned into a set of graphic novels, this story revolves around a crew in charge of rebuilding structures, while Mia, the newest member, gets to know her team, and opens up about her reasoning for joining their ship - to find the love she lost, specifically her girlfriend Grace.	Tillie Walden
2016–2017	On a Sunbeam	Grace	Lesbian	Later turned into a set of graphic novels, this story revolves around a crew in charge of rebuilding structures, while Mia, the newest member, gets to know her team, and opens up about her reasoning for joining their ship - to find the love she lost, specifically her girlfriend Grace.	Tillie Walden
2016–2018	Fire Punch	Togata	Trans man	Togata is a transgender cinephile with a deep love of films and action heroes, which influence his personality. Due to his regenerative abilities, he is physically unable to transition, causing him gender dysphoria.	Tatsuki Fujimoto
2018–2023	Mage & Demon Queen	Malori "Mal" Crowett	Lesbian	This webcomic is focused on Malori, a young female mage, who is supposed to kill the Demon Queen, Velverosa, but is deeply in love with her. As such, the queer relationship between them is a central part of the story.	Kuru (Note: Also known as Color LES)
2018–2023	Mage & Demon Queen	Queen "Vel" Velverosa	Pansexual	This webcomic is focused on Malori, a young female mage, who is supposed to kill the Demon Queen, Velverosa, but is deeply in love with her. As such, the queer relationship between them is a central part of the story.	Kuru
2018–2023	Mage & Demon Queen	Axel Dronvar	Pansexual	In the first season of the comic, Cerik shows a romantic interest in lamia and their queen Melathia, remaining oblivious to all others in love with him. In the second season of the comic, legendary hero Axel Dronvar attempts to convince Malori, Cerik and Princess Leora for form a harem with him; Axel subsequently brings Cerik on a nonromantic date in Folstina after learning that he too comes from Earth, as do Princess Leora and Malori.	Kuru
2018–2023	Mage & Demon Queen	Cerik Aldebrandt	Pansexual	In the first season of the comic, Cerik shows a romantic interest in lamia and their queen Melathia, remaining oblivious to all others in love with him. In the second season of the comic, legendary hero Axel Dronvar attempts to convince Malori, Cerik and Princess Leora for form a harem with him; Axel subsequently brings Cerik on a nonromantic date in Folstina after learning that he too comes from Earth, as do Princess Leora and Malori.	Kuru
2018–2023	Mage & Demon Queen	King Albert Siegwald	Pansexual	In the second season, Albert is shown to have recruited to his dragon hunting party in his youth, by having seduced and had sex with prospective party members regardless of their gender, believing it to be the polite thing to do after a miscommunication.	Kuru
2018–2023	Mage & Demon Queen	Princess Leora Siegwald	Pansexual trans woman	It is shown that Leora has a crush on Malori and Axel; Leora is also shown to be transgender, as she mentions that she used to be the prince, Leopold.	Kuru
2018–2024	Motherlover	Imogen	Bisexual	Initially married to a man, Imogen divorces him after learning he is having an affair and later moves in and loves in fall with Alex.	Lindsay Ishihiro
2018–2024	Motherlover	Alex	Lesbian	Imogen's neighbor and later lover.	Lindsay Ishihiro
2018–2024	Motherlover	Lulu	Trans woman	Imogen's oldest child, who comes out during the story.	Lindsay Ishihiro
2019–present	Castle Swimmer	Kappa	Queer	Two mermen who are in love with each other.	Wendy Lian Martin
2019–present	Castle Swimmer	Siren	Queer	Two mermen who are in love with each other.	Wendy Lian Martin
2019–2021	Senpai wa Otokonoko	Saki Aoi	Bisexual	A romance manga following a love triangle involving the bisexual woman Saki Aoi, the cross-dressing man Makoto Hanaoka, and Makoto's friend Ryūji Taiga, who initially is unsure about being with another man.	Pom
2019–2021	Senpai wa Otokonoko	Ryūji Taiga	Queer	A romance manga following a love triangle involving the bisexual woman Saki Aoi, the cross-dressing man Makoto Hanaoka, and Makoto's friend Ryūji Taiga, who initially is unsure about being with another man.	Pom
2019–present	I Think I Turned My Childhood Friend into a Girl	Kenshirou Midou	Queer	Hobbyist make-up artist Kenshirou Midou and his childhood friend Hiura Mihate are attracted to each other. After Kenshirou practices applying make-up on Hiura, the latter realizes he enjoys being feminine, and starts cross-dressing regularly.	Azusa Banjo
2019–present	I Think I Turned My Childhood Friend into a Girl	Hiura Mihate	Queer	Hobbyist make-up artist Kenshirou Midou and his childhood friend Hiura Mihate are attracted to each other. After Kenshirou practices applying make-up on Hiura, the latter realizes he enjoys being feminine, and starts cross-dressing regularly.	Azusa Banjo
2019–present	Aurora	Caliban	Non-binary	According to the character sheet, the Ignan god Caliban uses he/him, she/her, and they/them pronouns, the primordial entity Life uses she/her and they/them pronouns, and the primordial entity known as the Void Dragon uses he/him and they/them pronouns.	Red
2019–present	Aurora	Primordial Life	Non-binary	According to the character sheet, the Ignan god Caliban uses he/him, she/her, and they/them pronouns, the primordial entity Life uses she/her and they/them pronouns, and the primordial entity known as the Void Dragon uses he/him and they/them pronouns.	Red
2019–present	Aurora	Void Dragon	Non-binary	According to the character sheet, the Ignan god Caliban uses he/him, she/her, and they/them pronouns, the primordial entity Life uses she/her and they/them pronouns, and the primordial entity known as the Void Dragon uses he/him and they/them pronouns.	Red
2019–present	Aurora	Dainix	Trans man	According to the character sheet, Dainix uses he/him pronouns, and transitioned in the past.	Red

== 2020s ==
Year(s)	Title	Character(s)	Identity	Description	Created by
2024–2025	Avengers Academy: Marvel's Voices	Aaron Fischer	Queer	A Marvel Unlimited webcomic which follows the new students of the Avengers Academy as they work together, fight off enemies who want to bring down the school, and figure out what kind of heroes they want to be. It also takes a look at their dating lives and, starting in issue 21, takes a look at the character of Arnie Roth, a groundbreaking gay character introduced in the 1980s.	Anthony Oliveira and Marvel Comics
2024–2025	Avengers Academy: Marvel's Voices	Brielle Brooks	Queer	A Marvel Unlimited webcomic which follows the new students of the Avengers Academy as they work together, fight off enemies who want to bring down the school, and figure out what kind of heroes they want to be. It also takes a look at their dating lives and, starting in issue 21, takes a look at the character of Arnie Roth, a groundbreaking gay character introduced in the 1980s.	Anthony Oliveira and Marvel Comics
2024–2025	Avengers Academy: Marvel's Voices	Justin Jin	Gay	A Marvel Unlimited webcomic which follows the new students of the Avengers Academy as they work together, fight off enemies who want to bring down the school, and figure out what kind of heroes they want to be. It also takes a look at their dating lives and, starting in issue 21, takes a look at the character of Arnie Roth, a groundbreaking gay character introduced in the 1980s.	Anthony Oliveira and Marvel Comics
2024–2025	Avengers Academy: Marvel's Voices	Shela Sexton	Trans woman	A Marvel Unlimited webcomic which follows the new students of the Avengers Academy as they work together, fight off enemies who want to bring down the school, and figure out what kind of heroes they want to be. It also takes a look at their dating lives and, starting in issue 21, takes a look at the character of Arnie Roth, a groundbreaking gay character introduced in the 1980s.	Anthony Oliveira and Marvel Comics
2020	Hazbin Hotel	Alastor	Asexual	The comic, which is based on the namesake animated web series, features the show's multiple LGBTQ characters. Vivziepop announced a prequel comic focusing on the characters prior to the events of the series. As of July 2020, the first chapter of the webcomic titled "Dirty Healings" has been completed containing twenty-two pages and hosted on the official website. Another comic titled "A Day in the After Life" which focused on Alastor's daily life in hell was uploaded on the website on October 19, 2020.	Vivienne Medrano
2020–present	I Cross-Dressed for the IRL Meetup	Satoshi "Cocoa" Morinaga	Queer	A manga following three cross-dressing men – Cocoa, Opera, and Lemon – and one trans woman, Kantentarou, who are part of a monthly meet-up. The main character, Cocoa, is attracted to Opera.	Kurano
2020–present	I Cross-Dressed for the IRL Meetup	Kantentarou	Trans woman	A manga following three cross-dressing men – Cocoa, Opera, and Lemon – and one trans woman, Kantentarou, who are part of a monthly meet-up. The main character, Cocoa, is attracted to Opera.	Kurano
2020–present	Iron Nail Afternoon	Big	Bisexual	Follows the story of supernatural fighters in a world of monsters. Against this background, star-crossed lovers and estranged family members must come to terms with their relationships.	LJ Phillips
2020–present	Iron Nail Afternoon	Rachel	Bisexual	Follows the story of supernatural fighters in a world of monsters. Against this background, star-crossed lovers and estranged family members must come to terms with their relationships.	LJ Phillips
2020–present	Iron Nail Afternoon	Skollina	Intersex	Follows the story of supernatural fighters in a world of monsters. Against this background, star-crossed lovers and estranged family members must come to terms with their relationships.	LJ Phillips
2020–present	Iron Nail Afternoon	Whithers	Gay	Follows the story of supernatural fighters in a world of monsters. Against this background, star-crossed lovers and estranged family members must come to terms with their relationships.	LJ Phillips
2021–present	What Happens Next	Milo Holliday	Trans man	Traces the ongoing, years-long fallout from a juvenile murder case, which binds a disparate group of young queer and trans people in a complex web of trauma that affects both their online and real-world lives.	Max Graves
2021–present	What Happens Next	Viktoria Escamilla	Trans woman	Traces the ongoing, years-long fallout from a juvenile murder case, which binds a disparate group of young queer and trans people in a complex web of trauma that affects both their online and real-world lives.	Max Graves
2021–present	What Happens Next	Griffin Petty	Trans man	Traces the ongoing, years-long fallout from a juvenile murder case, which binds a disparate group of young queer and trans people in a complex web of trauma that affects both their online and real-world lives.	Max Graves
2021–present	What Happens Next	Gage Ludemann	Nonbinary	Traces the ongoing, years-long fallout from a juvenile murder case, which binds a disparate group of young queer and trans people in a complex web of trauma that affects both their online and real-world lives.	Max Graves
2021–present	What Happens Next	Xandra Blumberg	Trans woman	Traces the ongoing, years-long fallout from a juvenile murder case, which binds a disparate group of young queer and trans people in a complex web of trauma that affects both their online and real-world lives.	Max Graves
2021–present	What Happens Next	Josslyn Twohy	Pansexual	Traces the ongoing, years-long fallout from a juvenile murder case, which binds a disparate group of young queer and trans people in a complex web of trauma that affects both their online and real-world lives.	Max Graves

== See also ==
- LGBT themes in comics
- LGBT themes in American mainstream comics
- Lists of LGBT figures in fiction and myth
- List of graphic art works with LGBT characters
