= List of fictional transgender characters =

This is a list of transgender characters in fiction, i.e. characters that either self-identify as transgender (often shortened to "trans") or have been identified by outside parties to be trans. (Note: Although trans people are not to be confused with cross-dressers or transvestites, those who consider themselves transsexual are also trans.) Listed characters are either recurring characters, cameos, guest stars, or one-off characters. This page does not include trans characters in film or television.

For more information about fictional characters in other parts of the LGBTQ community, see the lists of lesbian, bisexual, gay, non-binary, pansexual, aromantic, asexual, and intersex characters.

The names are organized alphabetically by surname (i.e. last name), or by single name, if the character does not have a surname. If more than two characters are in one entry, the last name of the first character is used.

== Animation ==
Characters	Show title	Gender identity	Character debut date	Notes	Country
Alice	Superjail!	Trans woman	September 28, 2008	A hulking and muscular head prison guard of Superjail. She is a trans woman who regularly engages in sadomasochistic rituals with the prisoners, and rebuffs The Warden's constant advances as shown in episodes like "Jailbot 2.0". She may have dated women before, and has sex with The Mistress, a series antagonist who is proprietor of Ultraprison, an all female prison as shown in the episode "Stingstress".	United States
Ai Asato	KochiKame: Tokyo Beat Cops	Trans woman	December 4, 1990	She is a transit officer who works for the Katsushika Police who is commonly referred to as Maria. In the manga, she uses a magical wish to transition her gender from male to female. In the anime, she doesn't use any magic. Her character is best known for her strong romantic, and somewhat obsessive, affection for Kankichi Ryotsu, one of the series protagonists.	Japan
Megumi Amatsuka	Cheeky Angel	Trans woman	June 4, 2002	Megumi is a physically attractive trans woman who retains her masculine mannerisms and fighting abilities, which she uses very often, attracting the 'Megu-chan Protection Club', a group of misfit admirers. Nobody else knows she used to be a boy but was transformed into a girl. Initially, only Megumi's best friend, Miki, knew her secret, however the protection club quickly finds out.	Japan
Karnatia Seri Anabald	So I'm a Spider, So What?	Trans woman	January 8, 2021	Karnatia, who is also known as Kanata Ōshima or Katia, is the best friend of the series' side-story protagonist Shun Analeit. Before the start of the series she was a boy who was the classmate of the series protagonists and was heavily implied to be gay throughout the flashback chapters, as well as to suffer from gender dysphoria. After being reincarnated following the destruction of her classroom, when she and her classmates were reborn into the magical world of the series, Katia was reborn into a female body.	Japan
Makoto Ariga	Wandering Son	Trans woman	January 20, 2011	Makoto, known as Mako for short, was assigned male at birth like Shuichi, expressing a desire to be a straight trans woman primarily due to her love of men and crossdressing like Shuichi. She dreams of entering into a relationship with a cool adult man.	Japan
Kintarou Arisugawa	Maria-sama ga Miteru	Trans woman	January 29, 2007	Also known as Alice, she is enrolled in Hanadera Academy, and her inner female identity is at odds with her male appearance. As such, she is overjoyed at the decision by Sachiko to swap the genders of those students playing in a school play. She later runs for a secretary position on the Student Council of Lillian Girls' Academy, as noted in the light novel.	
Nagi "Alice" Arisuin	Chivalry of a Failed Knight	Trans woman	October 10, 2015	Alice is a first year student and Shizuku's roommate. She is a transgender woman who has magical powers. She can control shadows with her device, the Darkness Hermit. Her Noble Arts include Shadow Bind, Shadow Walk and Shadow Spot. Alice is a very nice person, though she does sometimes tease others, and cause misunderstandings.	Japan
Anita Bidet	The Oblongs	Trans woman	April 2, 2001	Anita Bidet is the owner of the bar Rusty Bucket and Pickles Oblong's friend. She is a pre-op transgender woman who is saving up money for gender reassignment surgery. The series creator called her a "drag queen".	United States
Rachel Bighead	Rocko's Modern Life	Trans woman	September 25, 1994	In the Rocko's Modern Life: Static Cling special, Rachel is revealed to be a transgender woman when Rocko, Heffer, and Filburt find her.	United States
Brooklyn	Moon Girl and Devil Dinosaur	Trans woman	February 10, 2023	Brooklyn is one of Lunella's classmates. In the first episode "Moon Girl Landing", Brooklyn's water bottle has a trans pride sticker that says "Trans is beautiful". Brooklyn is voiced by trans and non-binary actor Indya Moore. In November 2024, it was reported that the second-season episode "The Gatekeeper", about Brooklyn facing discrimination for being a transgender girl, was shelved by Disney before it aired.	United States
Cagliostro	Symphogear AXZ	Trans woman	July 1, 2017	She used to be a man who was a swindler known for his endless lies, before being granted a perfect body by Saint-Germain, becoming a trans woman, as noted in the episode "Last Resort". Cagliostro has since sworn to never lie about her feelings.	Japan
Candy Hector Caramella	Space Goofs	Trans woman	1997	Candy is the uptight homosexual neat freak. They get in touch with their feminine side by sometimes disguising themselves as a woman as shown in episodes like "Heavy Metal Madness" and "Back to School Blues". In many situations, Candy is the first to worry, as shown in the episode "Snoutra". Candy flirts with men and is implied to be transgender. This implication is confirmed by the game, "Stupid Invaders" with Candy planning a gender reassignment surgery with the best specialist in the universe.	France
Professor Caraway	High Guardian Spice	Trans man	October 26, 2021	Professor Caraway is a professor at the High Guardian Academy. In the third episode "Transformations", he is revealed to be a transgender man. Caraway is voiced by series creator Raye Rodriguez, who is also a trans man.	United States
Cliff Cay	Infinite Ryvius	Trans woman	October 6, 1999	Criff Cay is a member of the group Team Blue. She is indicated to be transgender when her sister Michelle refers to her as "Big Brother". Cay's official character profile states that she has an alluring look but is "actually male," and has a "beautiful appearance."	Japan
Cha-Cha	Bob's Burgers	Trans woman	March 6, 2011	Cha-Cha is a transgender sex worker who appears in the episode, "Sheesh! Cab, Bob?".	United States
Raúl Cocolotl	Wendell & Wild	Trans man	September 11, 2022	Raúl is a transgender male artist at an all girl's Catholic school who helps his friend Kat save the town from demons.	United States
Ida Davis	Family Guy	Trans woman	May 9, 2010	The "father" of Glenn and Brenda Quagmire and the ex-"husband" of Crystal Quagmire. Ida (formerly Dan) was a war hero in the Vietnam War and was thought to be a homosexual by Peter. When Glenn asked his "father" if this was true, Ida claimed that she was a woman trapped in a man's body and came to Quahog for a sex reassignment surgery, taking the name Ida Davis afterward as noted in the episode "Quagmire's Dad". From Season 17 onward, she became a recurring character, and some criticized her role in the show, stating that her character was previously the "butt of many transmisogynistic and transphobic "jokes,"" and that the show does not promote inclusivity.	United States
Dana Dufresne	The Loud House	Trans woman	July 21, 2016	She first appeared as the host (and judge) of a beauty pageant in "Toads and Tiaras" and reappeared in the episode "Gown and Out" in August 2018. Maddie Taylor, who does voice over for the character, revealed in August 2019 that the character had transitioned from a man to a trans woman, like herself, and said that the character would return in another episode within season 4. However, Season 4 concluded on July 23, 2020, although Dana reappeared in the Season 6 episode "Prize Fighter" and in other episodes.	United States
Desirée (Note: She is called "Jeffrey" for much of the series and is a protagonist of the series, with her sister, Sara)	Too Loud	Trans woman	July 9, 2017	Desirée is a volunteer librarian who works with her sister Sara, at the local library. In the episode "Slumber Party Sneak-In", she plots with her sister, Sara, to dress up as a girl in order to go to a slumber party. The rest of the girls find this out, they console her, accepting, and deciding they like her no matter whether she is a trans girl named Desirée or as a closeted boy. In September 2019, series creator Nico Colaleo described the episode as important, arguing it was his favorite episode of the show's second season, and a "pro-transgender episode". It was later revealed the episode was supposed to be the final episode of the series, but DreamWorks posted it too soon.	United States
Aoi Futaba	You're Under Arrest	Trans woman	November 12, 1996	Aoi Futaba was initially male but once had to go undercover as a woman in a sting operation to catch some male molesters targeting women, and worked at Bokuto Station in the traffic division. However, after that she considered herself and has been treated by her colleagues as a trans woman. Though her romantic preferences are made unclear, she seems to prefer men, as shown in episodes like "Aoi-chan has a White Rose".	Japan
Herbert Garrison	South Park	Trans woman (detransitioned)	August 13, 1997	Originally presented as a closeted homosexual, the storylines have featured Garrison coming out as a gay man, then having a gender reassignment surgery to become female (known as Janet Garrison), becoming a lesbian, and then changing back to a man and becoming President of the United States. It is shown he still has feelings for his ex-boyfriend, Mr. Slave, as shown in the episode "Follow That Egg!".	United States
Glitter	Bob's Burgers	Trans woman	March 6, 2011	Glitter is a transgender sex worker who is said to be going under gender reassignment because she mentions the town being full of "Doctors who refuse to cut off your penis," who appears in the episode "Sheesh! Cab, Bob?".	United States
Barney Guttman	Dead End: Paranormal Park	Trans man	June 16, 2022	In an interview on August 17, 2020, series creator Hamish Steele described Barney as a trans male character. He also hoped that the show will help out "more trans creators getting their chance to tell their stories" while hinting at other LGBTQ characters in the show apart from Barney. Barney is in a same-sex relationship with Logs, a health and safety worker at Dead End. Barney is voiced by trans actor Zach Barack. Steele also said in an interview with The Hollywood Reporter that any possible future episodes would further explore the sexualities of Norma and Barney. In the second season, it is revealed Logs' mother is unaware that he is gay.	United Kingdom
Hermaphrobot	Futurama	Trans woman	November 14, 1999	Hermaphrobot is a manbot-to-fembot transgender Robot, who often engages Bender in a subversive manner, saying she is "more lady" than Bender could handle. Some critics have criticized her "intersex slur-referencing name," and her character being defined by her physical attributes, while playing into stereotypes.	United States
Lily Hoshikawa	Zombie Land Saga	Trans woman	October 4, 2018	Lily is a prodigious transgender child actress. She died from a heart attack caused by occupational stress and mental shock upon growing facial hair. Lily does not seemed displeased at the idea of being a zombie, because to her it means that she can be a child forever, preventing her from further experiencing the anxiety and gender dysphoria, as a trans girl, that previously ended her life.	Japan
Kano Ienega	Golden Kamuy	Trans woman	June 11, 2018	She is a trans woman and former doctor who feeds on the flesh of her victims to become youthful and beautiful. She debuts in Episode 11 of the anime and is part of "The Abashiri Convicts". Her character has been criticized for being an "evil beauty-obsessed trans woman", the series only trans character, with one reviewer stating that her villainy "revolves around her obsession with enhancing her own body," meaning that there are "transphobic overtones to Kano's motivation".	Japan
Jax	The Amazing Digital Circus	Trans woman	October 13, 2023	Jax is one of the humans trapped within the titular Digital Circus, a virtual reality simulation. The character is shown to be a closeted trans woman in the series' final episode, "Remember", and was further acknowledged as being transgender in statements by series creator Gooseworx and cast member Amanda Hufford.	Australia
Jewelstar	She-Ra and the Princesses of Power	Trans man	May 15, 2020	Jewelstar is a trans man who is voiced by a trans male actor, Alex Blue Davis. His character was designed by Ray Geiger.	United States
Kikunojo "Kiku"	One Piece	Trans woman	August 25, 2019	In both the manga and anime, Kiku is revealed to be a trans woman. Before being transported to the future, Kiku dressed in more masculine clothing typical of a samurai. After arriving in the future, Kiku began showing a significantly more feminine side, such as wearing red lipstick and dressing more in feminine clothing, and has described herself as a "a woman at heart," while she was assigned male at birth. Some described Kiku as a "breath of fresh air in terms of her strength and characterization" and noted that her gender identity is never ridiculed.	Japan
Natalie el-Khoury	Big Mouth	Trans woman	December 5, 2020	In the first episode of the show's fourth season, Natalie, a Lebanese-American trans female teenager is introduced. The episode she debuts in highlights "various, popular transphobic arguments", while giving her a supportive friend named Jessi, and another named Seth, who rejects her identity, who she rejects. She also appears in Human Resources, with episodes exploring Natalie's character.	United States
Seiko Kotobuki	Love Com	Trans woman	April 28, 2007	Seiko was assigned male at birth, but is actually a girl and even develops a crush on Atsushi Ōtani and Kazuki Kohori.	Japan
Kaoru Kurita	Wonder Egg Priority	Trans man	March 17, 2021	Kaoru is a trans boy hatched from Momoe's egg. His jacket is designed with colors replicant of the transgender flag. Having been assigned female at birth and struggling with his gender identity, Kaoru went to his kendo club advisor for advice. However, the teacher forced him down, beat him, and raped him, resulting in him becoming pregnant. This is presumably the reason that made Kaoru commit suicide. It is implied that Kaoru is bisexual as although he likes Momoe as a "boy" upon learning that she was a girl, he also makes it clear that he is still attracted to Momoe as female.	Japan
Marbles	Bob's Burgers	Trans woman	March 6, 2011	Marbles is a trans female sex worker who appears in the episode "Sheesh! Cab, Bob?" and describes pursuing sex reassignment surgery.	United States
Mariandale	Ixion Saga DT	Trans woman	November 3, 2012	A maid who wields pistols akimbo and protects the princess. She admits being jealous of the princess getting married and occasionally she reverts to her male voice. She also stated that her gender can't be defined. Near the end of the series, she offers up a part of herself to Eren as a way to make herself feel more female.	Japan
May Marigold	RWBY	Trans woman	November 30, 2019	May is a trans woman, which was confirmed by her voice actress, Kdin Jenzen, who is also transgender. She is a member of a rebellion faction and was inspired by the Robin Hood character Maid Marian. Her transgender identity was later confirmed on screen during the Volume 8 episode "War". May has a power that reflects elements of her personality, with hers being invisibility, which could be a manifestation of her dysphoria and will not to be seen.	United States
Marshmallow	Bob's Burgers	Trans woman	March 6, 2011	Marshmallow is a trans female sex worker. In June 2020, the show's creator committed to having Marshallow voiced by a Black LGBTQ actor rather than David Herman. Since "Fight at the Not Okay Chore-ral", Marshamllow has been voiced by Jari Jones	United States
Sallie May	Helluva Boss	Trans woman	April 30, 2021	Millie's sister, from episode 5: "The Harvest Moon Festival" and Helluva Shorts 1: "Hell's Belles". She is confirmed to be a trans woman by her voice actress, Morgana Ignis, who is also a trans woman. Ignis also explained that she was consulted on the character's trans representation by the show's production team, and called the character an authentic and meaningful form of representation for her own life as a trans woman.	United States
Morley	One Piece	Trans woman	April 13, 2019	A giant and as well as the commander of the West Army in the Revolutionary Army.	Japan
Nao	Skip and Loafer	Trans woman	April 4, 2023	Nao, the main character's aunt, is a trans woman, which is mentioned in the story. For example, in one episode, Mitsumi mentions that her aunt was assigned male at birth, and in another, she has to protect Nao from transphobic comments on the train.	Japan
Shuichi Nitori	Wandering Son	Trans woman	January 13, 2011	Shuichi Nitori, otherwise known by Shu (シュウ, Shū) and Nitorin (にとりん), is a lesbian transgender woman and often dresses to assume the role of the female gender, and is often described as cute, able to appear as a girl while cross-dressing, which is encouraged by their friends Yoshino Takatsuki and Saori Chiba. Later on, they exhibit signs of gender dysphoria and displays an outward attraction to two characters in the series—Yoshino, a transgender man, and their female classmate, Anna Suehiro. The latter date for a short time, until the relationship is broken off, and later resumed.	Japan
Ollie de Ooievaar	Alfred J. Kwak	Trans man	December 24, 1989	Ollie is one of the protagonist's close friends. At the start of the series he is referred to with female pronouns, but after a timeskip he starts using male pronouns. This is never directly addressed during the series. In a Dutch interview from 2013 Ollie was confirmed to be a trans man.	Netherlands
Hazumu Osaragi	Kashimashi: Girl Meets Girl	Trans woman	January 11, 2006	The series protagonist, Hazumu Osaragi begins the series as a boy. After being rejected by a schoolgirl named Yasuna Kamiizumi, they are inadvertently killed due to an alien spacecraft crash-landing on them, with the alien, Hitoshi Sora, resurrecting Hazumu, but changes their physical sex to female. For the rest of the series, the agender Hazumu adopts to life as a girl, is attracted to two of her childhood friends: Yasuna, and Tomari Kurusu.	Japan
Hibari Ōzora	Stop!! Hibari-kun!	Trans woman	May 20, 1983	Assigned male at birth, Hibari looks and behaves as a girl, expresses interest in having breasts, and has become more feminine after Kōsaku starts living at her household. She has demonstrated romantic interest in Kōsaku and is implied to have zero interest in women.	Japan
Cherry Pie	The Nutshack	Trans woman	April 7, 2009	A friendly, flirtatious Vietnamese woman who is a virgin and runs a salon. She is said to dominate "the Vietnamese Cross dressing scene".	United States
Cherry Pie	The Nutshack	Trans woman	April 7, 2009	A friendly, flirtatious Vietnamese woman who is a virgin and runs a salon. She is said to dominate "the Vietnamese Cross dressing scene".	Philippines
Brunella Pommelhorst	The Simpsons	Trans man	November 21, 2001	Mrs. Pommelhorst is the gym teacher who announced his intention to take time off and return as "Mr. Pommelhorst, the shop teacher" in the episode "My Fair Laddy", although he later returned as the same.	
Prelati	Symphogear AXZ	Trans woman	July 1, 2017	Like Cagliostro, she used to be a man who indulged in luxury and pleasure, before being granted a perfect female body by Saint-Germain, becoming a trans woman, following his defeat at her hands in the episode "Last Resort". Prelati has since sworn to become an earnest researcher, but sometimes lets her preference for fun get in the way of her work.	Japan
Selma Reesedale	Gotham Girls	Trans woman	2002	Selma Reesedale works for the Gotham PD. She is revealed to be a transgender woman, which Batgirl discovers, and she later helps Batgirl. Batgirl is one of the only characters who knows Selma's secret. She is possibly the first trans sci-fi character to appear in any "superhero production".	United States
Rosa	Young Justice	Trans woman	August 13, 2019	Rosa, also known as Fury, is a member of Lex Luthor's Infinity Inc. She is based on the Erik Storn incarnation of the character. In June 2022, series developer Greg Weisman confirmed that Rosa is transgender when he retweeted from a fan. Rosa is voiced by transgender actress Quei Tann.	United States
Snapdragon	High Guardian Spice	Trans woman	October 26, 2021	Snapdragon is a snarky student, and friend of Amaryllis, with red hair who goes to the same academy. Throughout the series, Snap figures out who they are and Caraway helps them move toward gender transition. The voice actress for Snap, Julia Kaye, confirmed that Snap is a trans woman and that Rodriguez based aspects of the character on her. Rodriguez further confirmed that Snap is a trans woman.	United States
Stephanie	Sorcerous Stabber Orphen	Trans woman	February 27, 1999	Stephanie, also known as Steph, was Orphen's old partner and initially a man but was severely injured and while using the rest of his magic to cast a healing spell, made some "modifications", and became the trans woman Stephanie, as shown in the episode "Snake in the Temple". She falls in love with and marries her boyfriend the florist Tim but continues to help Orphen and his friends, although she later becomes their foe.	Japan
Hinata Tachibana	Life with an Ordinary Guy who Reincarnated into a Total Fantasy Knockout	Trans woman	January 11, 2022	A frustrated and lonely man, save for his friend Jinguji Tsukasa, Hinata drunkenly expresses his wish to become a woman, saying "I want to become a woman so beautiful that I couldn't possibly exist in this world". The wish is granted by a goddess who transports the two of them to a fantasy world and transforms Hinata into a woman. Despite her protests and claims not to have made such a wish, her "game stats" list her gender (not sex) as female, heavily indicating that she is in fact trans, as supported by her prior despair-induced outburst.	Japan
Yoshino Takatsuki	Wandering Son	Trans man	January 13, 2011	A tall, transmasculine child who experiments with Shuichi Nitori to cross-dress as a boy, and wants to be a boy. Yoshino also, like Shuichi, becomes friends with a trans woman, Yuki, and Saori Chiba, who becomes a "queer ally to Shuichi." Later on, Shuichi is attracted to Yoshino.	Japan
Terrestrius	The Dragon Prince	Trans man	November 3, 2022	Terry, whose full name is Terrestrius, is an Earthblood elf who was born into a female body and faced discrimination as a result of this. As a result, he is very empathetic and has a desire to embrace and be embraced by others. According to his voice actor, Terry is mid-transition. He is also Claudia's Earthblood elf boyfriend.	United States
Terrestrius	The Dragon Prince	Trans man	November 3, 2022	Terry, whose full name is Terrestrius, is an Earthblood elf who was born into a female body and faced discrimination as a result of this. As a result, he is very empathetic and has a desire to embrace and be embraced by others. According to his voice actor, Terry is mid-transition. He is also Claudia's Earthblood elf boyfriend.	Canada
Raine Whispers	The Owl House	Transmasculine	July 24, 2021	Raine is the head witch of the Bard Coven who uses they/them pronouns. Raine is Disney TVA's first non-binary character, having been confirmed as non-binary by Avi Roque, who voices the character. Roque later made the additional statement that Raine is transgender and transmasculine. In a similar vein, art by series storyboarder King Pecora depicted the character with apparent top surgery scars. Raine's teenage self is voiced by non-binary actor Blu del Barrio.	United States
Yamato	One Piece	Trans man	May 2, 2021	He idolized Kozuki Oden as a child, emulating everything about the samurai warrior, and his pronouns are respected by Kozuki. He has also been described as a "rebellious son of a pirate emperor," and noted as a fan-favorite character.	Japan
Isabella Yamamoto	Paradise Kiss	Trans woman	October 20, 2005	Isabella was assigned male at birth, but lives as a trans woman as revealed in the episode "Rose". Robin Brenner calls the character "one of the most realistic and accepting portrayals of a transgender character in anime," with the same applying to the manga. She acts as a mother figure to the members of ParaKiss and inspired George to make several dresses for Isabella since childhood.	Japan
Airi Yamamoto / Kentaro Yamamoto	Back Street Girls	Trans woman	July 4, 2018	Kentaro, Ryo and Kazuhiko are forced by their boss, Inugane, to go to Thailand to undergo sex reassignment surgery, and train to become idols. They debut as Airi, Mari and Chika, the Gokudols.	Japan
Yuki	Wandering Son	Trans woman	January 20, 2011	A tall and attractive straight trans woman who lives with her boyfriend Shiina and runs a gay bar. She takes an early interest in Yoshino, whom she remains on good terms with after learning of their assigned sex, even giving Yoshino and Shuichi helpful advice when troubled. She becomes their confidente and mentor-of-sorts. Due to her transition, she has not been on good terms with her parents, who run a uniform store as shown in the episode "Cool Girlfriend ~Green eye~". She also runs a gay bar.	Japan
Zadie	Danger & Eggs	Trans woman	June 30, 2017	In the final episode of the series, Zadie, who sings about acceptance at a Pride festival, helps the series' protagonists understand the meaning of a chosen family. She is voiced by Jazz Jennings, a pansexual and transgender LGBT rights activist.	United States
Zagan	Dead End: Paranormal Park	Trans woman	June 16, 2022	Series creator Hamish Steele confirmed on Twitter that Zagan is trans. Zagan is voiced by transgender actress and singer Michaela Jaé Rodriguez.	United Kingdom

== Comics ==
Characters	Name of comic	Years	Notes
Anode and Lug	The Transformers	2005–present	Anode and Lug are a transgender lesbian couple in the IDW Transformers comic series.
Arcee	The Transformers	2005–present	The Autobot Arcee is a transgender lesbian within the IDW Transformers comic series.
Alain	Shutter	2014–present	In the third issue of this urban fantasy series, the protagonist Kate Kristopher's lifelong friend, Alain, is revealed to be a trans woman.
Claire Augustus	Questionable Content	2003–present	This comic by Jeph Jacques includes characters of various sexualities, transgender woman Claire, as well as various other themes of sexuality.
Bebe (Beatrice)	Cheer Up: Love and Pompoms	2021	A graphic novel that tells the story of two queer high school students Beatrice (who is transgender) and Annie, who become members of their school's cheerleading squad.
Blaze	Jem and the Holograms	2015–2017	Sophie Campbell, the artist for the series, came out as a trans woman in March 2015, and she created a new character for the series named Blaze, who is also trans.
Braga	Rat Queens	2013–present (Note: The series was put on hiatus in April 2016 and returned in March 2017 with the new artist Owen Gieni.)	In January 2015, this punk rock comic revealed that Braga, a "fearsome orc warrior," is a trans woman, in an issue about her titled "Rat Queens Special: Braga #1". Due to a number of personnel changes, trans artist Tamra Bonvillain became the colorist of the comics in the fall of 2015, making the comic series "another book with both a trans character and a trans person on the creative team".
Cassandra/Urdr	The Wicked + The Divine	2014–2019	This comic features various queer characters, like a gender non-conforming character named Inanna, and a trans woman (and journalist) named Cassandra/Urdr. Reviewers have noted that not only is Cassandra/Urdr a well-developed character, but that it serves as "one of the best portrayals of a trans character so far in comics" due to the way it handles her "being trans, and other people's transphobia".
Zoë Alexis Carter	Venus Envy	2001–2014	The protagonist of this webcomic, she adjusts to school life as a girl and has severe depression.
Larson Delgado	Venus Envy	2001–2014	A trans Latino boy who is, like Lisa, friends with Zoë, going to the same high school, and often wears chest binders.
Circuit Breaker	DC Comics	2023–present	Circuit Breaker (Julien Jourdain) is a superhero with the power to manipulate the Still Force, giving him the ability to manipulate kinetic energy and negate motion. He goes by both he/him and they/them pronouns, and has been described as a "trans man, but not super into the binary."
Shvaughn Erin	Legion of Super-Heroes	1992	Shvaughn Erin is a member of the Science Police, the law enforcement arm of the United Planets. She is later revealed to be a transgender woman who transitioned using the medicine Profem.
Escapade (Shela Sexton)	Marvel Comics	2022	Shela Sexton is a transgender mutant with the ability to trade places, superpowers, and attributes with anyone within a seven-foot radius. She was introduced in the special issue Marvel's Voices: Pride (2022).
Lord Fanny	The Invisibles	1996	Fanny, a shaman from Brazil, was assigned male at birth but raised as a girl.
Rain Flaherty / Liriel Rain Bryer	Rain	2010–2022	This comic by Jocelyn Samara DiDomenick features a trans girl, Rain, as the main character and other LGBT+ characters, like a bisexual woman named Fara Bryer, a lesbian woman named Maria Strongwell, a gay man named Rudy Strongwell, an asexual girl named Chanel Montoya, and a number of others with an "unknown" sexuality (Anastacia Rubina, Brett Desrocher, Quenton Morrison, and Chiaki Koizumi). Additionally, this comic features two bisexual men (Randy Martin Guy and Kylie Coven), an asexual man named Arthur Feltman, and a gay couple (Trevor Kurz and Frank Johnson).
Kate Godwin (Coagula)	Doom Patrol	1993	Kate, otherwise known as Coagula, is a trans woman, and part of a superhero team known as Doom Patrol, with the comic itself was written by Rachel Pollack, a trans woman. Kate has the power to "coagulate and dissolve liquids at will," and is bisexual, entering into a relationship with Robotman, a character who has the body of a robot and a human brain. Pollack said this was wonderful because Kate "brought together the story and its implicit themes — body issues and extreme outsiders learning to accept themselves and embrace life".
Janis	Dykes to Watch Out For	1983–2008	This comic by Alison Bechdel features multiple LGBTQ characters, the trans adolescent daughter of Jasmine, Janis.
Jak	Go Get a Roomie!	2010–present	In this webcomic, by Chloé C., which explores sexual themes, Jak is a "transboi friend" of the protagonist, Roomie, and has a girlfriend named Gulden.
Jo	Lumberjanes	2014–2020	This series, by Grace Ellis and Shannon Watters, features various LGBTQ characters. Jo is a trans woman of color with two dads, and acts as an "expert on what it means to be a Lumberjane" to the fellow campers. One reviewer described Jo as "the first trans protagonist of an all-ages comic".
Judi	Bruno	1996–2007	In this comic by Christopher Baldwin, the titular character is bisexual and a minor character is transgender.
Julia	Up and Out	2013–present	More recent comics focus on the Julia Kaye's experiences of transitioning from male to female, with the character also named Julia.
Kylie	Trans Girl Next Door	2013–present	This autobiographical comic by Kylie Wu is about the author's transition as a transgender woman.
Masquerade	Blood Syndicate	1993–1994	Although he is a shapeshifter, he is a trans man, making him the first trans male superhero, with Fade finding out his assigned gender in another issue of the comic, but he works as a "male superhero because that is his idealized version of himself".
Claude de Montesse	Claudine	1978	The youngest son of an aristocratic family in early 20th century France, Claude is a trans man who faces tragedy and hardship in his romantic life. Claudine is notable for being one of the earliest manga to feature a transgender protagonist.
Victoria October	Detective Comics	2017–present	A transgender bioweapons expert and physician, October debuted in Detective Comics as an ally of Batman.
Porcelain	Secret Six	2014–present	In this comic, Gail Simone introduced another trans character in Secret Six #4 on July 15, 2015, with Porceline starting to present in a masculine way, whether than a feminine way, explaining to their team that "some days they feel more like a man, some days they feel more like a woman".
Prill	Witchy	2014–present	This comic by Ariel Ries features a trans girl named Prill, a witch who is Nyneve's class, a bully at first, but then later becomes an ally.
Marisa Rahm	Deathwish	1994	A four-issue mini-series published by Milestone and set in their Dakotaverse, shared universe. The main character is trans woman Marisa Rahm, a police detective who has spent years on an obsessive hunt for a serial killer. Rahm's girlfriend, Dini, is also a trans woman. The series was written by trans writer Maddie Blaustein.
Rosemaster	Cucumber Quest	2011–present	This comic by Gigi D.G. features two girls, Peridot and Almond, who have crushes on each other, and a complex trans woman character named Rosemaster, who is a villain in this story.
Sam	Baker Street	1989–1991	In this "punk rock take on Sherlock Holmes," Sam is revealed to be trans in the second volume of this comic.
Sera	Angela: Asgard's Assassin	2013–present	In Angela: Asgard's Assassin #3, Sera notes she was born into an all-male group in the home of angels and is portrayed as a "likable character who is a trans woman of color". She later appeared in two other series, 1602: Witchhunter Angela and Angela: Queen of Hel (2015–2016), where she and Angel share two "on-panel kisses".
Timofey	Unsounded	2010–present	Timofey is a trans boy who is a poetic intangible construct formed by a selection of ghosts and housed in First Light created by Bastion Winalils, acting as his master's disobedient servant. Originally given a feminine appearance due to being created by Bastion's attempt to resurrect his sister after her death, Bastion's creation insisted he saw himself as male and named himself "Timofey". His creator eventually relented and gave him shorter hair and a black suit with a cape and cravat rather to replace the dress he was originally given (fashioned after his sister's favorite).
Stefan Sequidy	Unsounded	2010–present	The mayor of Durlyne City, who is "kind of a prick [buy] not a bad guy". Named Sara at birth by his parents, Stefan is one of the few trans-men in Unsounded to be able to take advantage of the Third Option in Alderode.
Stephie	Assigned Male	2014–present	This comic by Sophie Labelle follows life through the eyes of a middle schooler named Stephie who alternately makes light of, and chafes under the realities of growing up a transgender child in a cisgender world.
Sula	O Human Star	2012–present	In this comic by Blue Delliquanti, main characters include gay men, River and Al, and a MtF trans robot named Sula.
Tong	FF	2012–2014	This young Moloid, is not human, but humanoid, showing up wearing a pink dress, and reveals herself as trans in FF #6, with her brothers embracing her.
Unnamed	The Sandman: The Doll's House	1990	In issue #14 of comic, there is a killer standing over a dead trans woman, and says "there's something about preoperative transsexuals that makes The Connoisseur uncomfortable. Something brittle and bright in the back of their eyes. He loves them. But he always feels they're laughing at him. He's only ever found eight that he's been able to talk to".
Wanda	The Sandman: A Game of You	1993	In issue #35 of comic, Wanda is living with Barbie, the book's protagonist, and she demands recognition that she is a woman despite the witch declaring she is a man. Later in the series, she is killed and her parents disrespect her wishes, bury her as a man, but Barbie crosses off the name on her tombstone, writing "Wanda" in red lipstick over it. She is said to be one of the "earliest and best examples of an actual trans person in comics," but her representation gives some trans people mixed feelings about this representation.
Watari Ryo	Boys Run the Riot	2020	Boys Run the Riot is a manga about Ryo Watari who is a trans man.
Alysia Yeoh	Batgirl	2011–2016	In Batgirl #19, on April 19, 2013, the Singaporean-American, and bisexual, roommate of Batgirl (Barbara Gordon), Alysia Yeoh, came out as trans, with some calling it "probably the biggest moment in American trans comics history". Before this point, Alysia had been a close friend of Barbara. Alysia coming out as trans was described as the "most prominent" trans character in comics up to that point, with writer Gail Simone working on Alysia's character "with input from trans friends and writers". Later on, Alysia, after announcing she was engaged to Jo in issue no. 42 and rescuing her in issue no. 44, walks down the isle and marries Jo, becoming the "first major trans character in a mainstream comic" to be "smiling in a wedding dress".
Ystina	Demon Knights	2011–2013	Ystina was introduced in the 2005 series Seven Soldiers as a new take on the character Shining Knight. In Demon Knights, Ystina states that they are male and female, with Demon Knights writer Paul Cornell labeling Ystina as trans. One reviewer said it is not clear if Ystina is "a trans man, bigender, intersex or some combination of those identities".
Zhen	Trees	2014–2016	In this science fiction series, there are two trans characters introduced. In issue no. 6, released in October 2014, Cenglei falls in love with a woman named Zhen who tells him she is a trans woman, and he realizes he has no problem with that, finding out his uncle is "actually a trans man".
Chenglei's Uncle	Trees	2014–2016	In this science fiction series, there are two trans characters introduced. In issue no. 6, released in October 2014, Cenglei falls in love with a woman named Zhen who tells him she is a trans woman, and he realizes he has no problem with that, finding out his uncle is "actually a trans man".

== Games ==
Characters	Title/Series	Year	Notes	Developer
Hainly Abrams	Mass Effect & Mass Effect: Andromeda	2017	Hainly Abrams leads scientific research on one of the Andromeda Initiative's outposts. When the game initially released, Abrams would readily inform the player that she is transgender and the masculine name she was given at birth. She tells the player that she left the Milky Way galaxy searching for greater acceptance of her gender identity. The abruptness with which she shares this information received criticism from fans, and the game was later patched so that Abrams would only reveal this information if the player developed a supportive relationship with her.	BioWare
Cremius "Krem" Aclassi	Dragon Age & Dragon Age: Inquisition	2014	Cremisius "Krem" Aclassi is a former Tevinter soldier and currently works for the mercenary company Bull's Chargers, led by Iron Bull. Krem is the first transgender character to appear in a BioWare video game.	BioWare
Erica Anderson	Catherine	2011	In this Japanese puzzle-platform and adventure game, Erica, the waitress at The Stray Sheep, is a trans woman.	Atlus
Erica Anderson	Catherine: Full Body	2019	In this Japanese puzzle and platform game, Erica, the waitress at The Stray Sheep, is revealed to be a trans woman in one of the endings.	Atlus
Birdo	Mario & Super Mario Bros. 2	1988	In the first-edition manual for the North American release of this NES game, Birdo is referred to as a "male who believes that he is a female" and would rather be called "Birdetta", making her the first transgender character for Nintendo. Birdo's name was also mistakenly switched with another Super Mario Bros. 2 enemy, Ostro, both in the manual and in the end credits. In Super Smash Bros. Brawl (2008), it is said that Birdo is of indeterminate gender. Her identity was only further explored in the Wii Japan-only video game Captain Rainbow (2008), which delves into her gender and how she was imprisoned for using the woman's bathroom, with her asking the player to find proof of her being female so she could be set free.	Nintendo
Bridget	Guilty Gear	2022	Bridget returns as the first character in Guilty Gear Strive's second downloadable content pack. Bridget was born male, one of twin brothers named and raised by her parents as a girl in a British village. They do this to protect her since the villagers believe that identical twins bring bad luck. In Strive, her arcade mode story revolves around her being unsure whether she is truly happy and is being her true self, which is revealed to be her questioning her gender identity in one of the endings. Depending on the difficulty of the arcade route, she makes progress towards figuring it out and accepting change for the better, with the Hard difficulty ending directly showing her coming out to Goldlewis Dickinson and Ky Kiske.	Arc System Works
Damien Bloodmarch	Dream Daddy: A Dad Dating Simulator	2017	In this visual novel and dating sim, Damien Bloodmarch is a gay trans man.	Game Grumps
Bob Hickman	Police Quest: Open Season	1993	This adventure game features a gay bar, with the player, a police officer trying to track down the murderer of his police partner, with his quest leading him to discover that his partner had a double life as a cross-dresser at a West Hollywood transgender bar.	Sierra On-Line
Isabeau	In Stars and Time	2023	Isabeau is stated to be a "trans faux-himbo". as well as confirmed to be transgender by the developer, who also called Isabeau pansexual. In his Friendquest, he shares that he was once a nerd with "neat braids" (feminine, like his name), and his past self is referred to by they/them pronouns before he "Changed" his own body to be an airheaded jock with a lot of intelligence.	insertdisc5
Lev	The Last of Us Part II	2020	Lev is a trans boy and former member of an antagonist faction who one of the main characters, Abby, meets and is scheduled to be executed. The two become friends through a series of mutual trials.	Naughty Dog
Jackie Jameson "J.J." Macfield	The Missing: J.J. Macfield and the Island of Memories	2018	Toward the end of the game, it is revealed that J.J. is a preoperative trans woman who was outed for being who she wants to be, and forced into conversion therapy by her transphobic mother, before attempting suicide by slitting her wrists and falling into a coma, thus setting off the game's events. Eventually, she regains her will to live with help from her plushie doll and the emergency medical team at the end of the game.	Arc System Works
Madeline	Celeste	2018	Towards the end of the game, in a portion of the game added in a 2019 update, Madeline can be seen at her desk with a pair of pride flags (transgender and the community rainbow flag) by her computer. This sparked a debate among fans about whether or not she is transgender, which was ended when Celeste developer Maddy Thorson confirmed Madeline to be trans.	Extremely OK Games
Mizhena	Baldur's Gate: Siege of Dragonspear & Baldur's Gate	2016	Mizhena is a transgender woman who explains to the main character that she picked her strange name after transitioning. The character, among other aspects of the game's writing, was met with significant criticism. Beamdog later announced that they would be expanding the character's story a week after the expansion pack released, saying in part, "In retrospect, it would have been better served if we had introduced a transgender character with more development".	Beamdog
The player character	Dys4ia	2012	In this abstract autobiographical game, the player controls a character transitioning and undergoing hormone replacement therapy. Journalists for The Guardian and the Penny Arcade Report observed that the game featured observations of the politics and personal development of those experiencing gender dysphoria.	Anna Anthropy
Tyler	Tell Me Why	2020	In this French adventure game, Tyler and his twin sister Alyson travel to their childhood home in Alaska and must come to terms with their childhood. The game will also deal with how Tyler, who has transitioned from female to male, since leaving home, is being affected. Dontnod worked with GLAAD to help create the character.	Dontnod Entertainment
V	Cyberpunk 2077	2020	In this Polish role-playing video game, the character creator will allow V to be transgender or non-binary.	CD Projekt Red
Venus	We Know the Devil	2015	In this visual novel, Venus is a trans girl, with her pronouns in the narration changing from "he" to "she" as she comes to terms with her identity.	Date Nighto
Ned Wynert	Assassin's Creed & Assassin's Creed Syndicate	2015	Ned Wynert is a minor non-playable character (NPC) and a trans man.	Ubisoft Quebec
Yasmin	Circuit's Edge	1989	This DOS Interactive fiction and role-playing game includes a variety of gay and transgender characters, including a trans woman named Yasmin with a gay man named Saied alleged to be Yasmin's former lover.	Westwood Studios
Zoe	Monster Prom	2018	Zoe is one of the two main love interests introduced in the Second Term DLC. She is officially stated to be transgender, and several of her events involve her discussing transitioning and dealing with trans specific struggles such as deadnaming, and misgendering.	Beautiful Glitch

== Literature ==
Characters	Work	Author	Year	Description
Patrick "Kitten" Braden	Breakfast on Pluto	Patrick McCabe	1998	Braden is an Irish trans woman (and drag queen), with "transvestism...a defiant rejection of bigotry, labels, and borders" as one reviewer put it, with Braden refusing to confirm to sexual stereotypes and even flirting with a cop. Later turned into a motion picture, another reviewer noted the prevalence of the "Irish Troubles," with Kitten wrongly arrested and charged after a "bombing in a London disco".
Emily Christina	Being Emily	Rachel Gold	2012	Never comfortable with being seen as a boy, they originally hide themselves as a girl, until they can no longer stand it anymore, with a psychologist later helping them in the coming-out process.
Ella	Just Girls	Rachel Gold	2014	Ella is a fully-transitioned, but closeted, trans woman who deals with a lot of transphobia while she explores her gender identity with a cisgender lesbian named Jess Tucker.
Jess Goldberg	Stone Butch Blues	Leslie Feinberg	1993	The narrative follows the life of Jess Goldberg, who grows up in a working class area of upstate New York in the 1940s to 1950s, and explores gender identity as a transmasculine butch lesbian.
Josh	Holding Still For As Long As Possible	Zoe Whittall	2009	Josh is a trans man and EMT who struggles with his identity.
Kade	Every Heart a Doorway	Seanan McGuire	2016	Kade is a classmate of Nancy, who has an asexual crush on them.
Felix Love	Felix Ever After	Kacen Callender	2020	This book follows Felix, who is a Black transgender art student facing transphobic abuse. Throughout the search for his bully, his connections between other characters and himself change in unexpected ways, and Felix goes on a journey of self-discovery and self-acceptance.
Anna Madrigal	Tales of the City series	Armistead Maupin	1978–2014	Anna is a trans woman, and Jake (introduced in 2007's Michael Tolliver Lives) is a trans man.
Jake Greenleaf	Tales of the City series	Armistead Maupin	1978–2014	Anna is a trans woman, and Jake (introduced in 2007's Michael Tolliver Lives) is a trans man.
Melissa	Melissa	Alex Gino	2015	Melissa is a transgender girl whom the world sees as a boy named George.
Roberta Muldoon	The World According to Garp	John Irving	1978	One of the story's main characters is Roberta, a trans woman and former player for the Philadelphia Eagles, and has a gender reassignment surgery, becoming the bodyguard of Jenny and one of the best friends of Garp.
Myron	Myra Breckinridge	Gore Vidal	1968	An attractive young woman, Myra Breckinridge is a film buff with a special interest in the Golden Age of Hollywood, and still in the process of transitioning and unable to obtain hormones, Myra transforms into Myron, and due to a car accident, is forced to have their breast implants removed, later deciding to settle down with Mary-Ann.
Luna (Liam) O'Neill	Luna	Julie Anne Peters	2004	The story follows the life of Luna, who keeps her trans identity secret originally, pretending to be an average 16-year-old senior boy named Liam in the daytime. Later she considers transitioning and fights for her right to be the person she feels that she was meant to be, helped by her sister, Regan, in the process.
Oshima	Kafka on the Shore	Haruki Murakami	2002	Oshima is a 21-year-old intellectual gay trans man who is a librarian and owner of a cabin in the mountains near Komura Memorial Library. He becomes the mentor of Kafka as he guides him to the answers that he's seeking on his journey.
Scratch	Nearly Roadkill	Kate Bornstein and Caitlin Sullivan	1996	Scratch and Winc are two lovers of an ambiguous gender identity, with the plot is told through cyberchats and emails between each other, while the FBI is engaged in a nationwide manhunt to find them.
Winc	Nearly Roadkill	Kate Bornstein and Caitlin Sullivan	1996	Scratch and Winc are two lovers of an ambiguous gender identity, with the plot is told through cyberchats and emails between each other, while the FBI is engaged in a nationwide manhunt to find them.
Dana Stevens	Trans-Sister Radio	Chris Bohjalian	2000	Dana, the protagonist of this book, is a Vermont professor who is prepared to have a gender reassignment surgery to transition from male to female, leading Allison Banks, a teacher who has been divorced, to be even more attracted to Dana.
Diana Wrayburn	The Shadowhunter Chronicles	Cassandra Clare	2007–present	The author implied Diana to be trans in one post, leading some to call her the first trans character to appear in this book series.
Yadriel	Cemetery Boys	Aiden Thomas	2020	Yadriel is a transgender boy determined to prove his gender and status as a brujo to his Latinx family. In an attempt to solve his cousin's disappearance, he accidentally summons another spirit with unfinished business. Together they go on a journey to solve these mysteries and, despite the difficulties they face, grow closer together.

== Theatre ==
=== Plays ===
Character	Playwright	Name of play/show	Year	Description
Herman Amberstone	Kate Bornstein	Hidden: A Gender	1990	This play brings together the stories of an intersex person, Herculine Barbin, living in Paris, and a fictional trans woman named Herman Amberstone based loosely on Bornstein herself. This play introduced audiences to the idea of "gender blur," and began the career of Justin Vivian Bond who plays Barbin.
Grace	Sarah Kane	Cleansed	1998	In this play, set in a university which has been converted into some form of bizarre institution under the rule of the sadistic Tinker, Grace, the sister of the protagonist, wears her brother's clothes and undergoes a gender reassignment surgery in the hospital.
Christine Jorgensen	Bradford Louryk	Christine Jorgensen Reveals	2005	In this docudrama-like show, stretching an hour long, Louryk channels the life of Christine Jorgensen who became the "first celebrity transwoman" in the U.S., when interviewed about her life and her gender identity by R. Russell, played by Nipsey Russell, who uses a pseudonym.
Lola	Philip Ridley	Mercury Fur	2005	In this play, set against the backdrop of a dystopian London with a narrative focusing around a party at which the torture and murder of a child is the main entertainment, Lola is a 19-year-old trans woman who is skilled at designing costumes and make-up, which she makes for the parties. The play influenced other playwrights like Lou Ramsden.
Charlotte von Mahlsdorf	Doug Wright	I Am My Own Wife	2003	Based on Wright's conversations with the German antiquarian Charlotte von Mahlsdorf, this play examines the life of Charlotte, born Lothar Berfelde, who killed her father when she was a young child and survived the Nazi and Communist regimes in East Berlin as a trans woman.
Max	Taylor Mac	Hir	2015	This is a play, produced by Playwrights Horizons, about a dysfunctional family including a mad housewife, a transgender child named Max, a son that spent three years in combat in Afghanistan, and a husband who had a stroke that left him nearly speechless. Max is a young trans male character, with gender being only "one piece of hir personality puzzle" in this play.
Vicky	Nicola Bland and Stacey Bland	Call Me Vicky	2019	This play tells the story of their mother, Vicky, her trials and tribulations in transiting from male to female, with Vicky ultimately transitioning by the end of the play.

=== Musicals ===
Characters	Playwright	Name of musical	Years	Description
La Cienega	Jeff Whitty	Bring It On the Musical	2011–present	Bring It On was the first Broadway musical to feature a transgender high school character, La Cienega, originally played by Gregory Haney.
Hedwig	John Cameron Mitchell	Hedwig and the Angry Inch	1998–2017	Although Hedwig, a survivor of abuse, a failed gender reassignment surgery, and abandonment, is one of the most famous roles of a trans woman in a musical, Mitchell said that they are not "traditionally transgender" but rather a "gender of one," and are a "man and woman, top and bottom".

=== Operas ===
Characters	Playwright	Name of opera	Year	Description
Hannah	Laura Kaminsky	As One	2014	The story follows Hannah, a transgender woman portrayed by two singers, Hannah Before (a baritone) and Hannah After (a mezzo-soprano), as she discovers her gender identity and learns to love herself in a world where she is not accepted. The organization of the opera is composed of two parts as representing essential moments of Hannah's coming of age through a series of episodes.
Sarah	Mark Campbell	Stonewall	2019	Stonewall is about the 1969 Stonewall riots, the spark of the modern LGBTQ rights movement, which received its world premiere June 2019 in conjunction with Stonewall 50 – WorldPride NYC 2019, projected to be the world's largest LGBTQ event. One of the characters, Sarah, is written for an openly transgender singer, mezzo-soprano Liz Bouk.

== See also ==
- List of feature films with transgender characters
- List of transgender characters in television
- List of animated films with LGBTQ characters
- List of animated series with LGBTQ characters
- List of cross-dressing characters in animated series
- List of bisexual characters in animation
- List of lesbian characters in animation
- List of gay characters in animation
- List of LGBTQ characters in soap operas
- LGBT themes in comics
- Lists of LGBTQ figures in fiction and myth
- List of LGBTQ-themed speculative fiction
- List of fictional intersex characters
