= Assigned Male =

Webcomic

- Cover of the comic book by Sophie Labelle.
- Author: Sophie Labelle
- Website: assignedmale.tumblr.com
- Current status/schedule: Live
- Launch date: September 13, 2014
- Genre(s): Drama, Slice-of-life, Comedy

Assigned Male, also called Serious Trans Vibes, is a webcomic illustrated and written by Sophie Labelle. It draws upon her experiences as a trans girl and woman. The comic, and series of zines, address issues of gender norms and privilege. It began in September 2014 and is ongoing, published in English and French. The webcomic is released in printed anthologies on Labelle's online store. (Note: These books include The World Needs More Trans Cuties, Dating Tips for Trans and Queer Weirdos, Gender Liberation and Warm Fuzzies, Help! Everything in my Life is Turning Gay, and The Assignment. Additionally, My Dad Thinks I'm a Boy?! and Nail Polish were prequels to the webcomic while Ultra Chicken Fun-Time Super Special was a spinoff from the webcomic.)

== Plot ==
This comic follows life through the eyes of a middle schooler named Stephie who alternately makes light of, and chafes under the realities of growing up a transgender child in a cisgender world.

== Characters ==
=== Protagonists ===
- Stephanie "Stephie" Bondu — An 11-year-old trans girl discovering and embracing her gender. Stephie is autistic and uses she/her pronouns. Her mother, Alice, understands quickly, while her father, Martin, doesn't understand until later. She later tells her friends she is bisexual.
- Ciel Sousa — A genderfluid seventh-grader who uses they/them and she/her pronouns. Virgil Sousa is their younger brother and Eirikur is their boyfriend.

=== Supporting ===
- Alice Bondu — Stephie's mother. From the beginning, she is supportive of Stephie, helping her transition. She is also bisexual, with Feyrouz as her girlfriend.
- Martin Bondu — Stephie's father. At first, he was not supportive of Stephie, not respecting her pronouns or name, but later changes his opinion.
- Brianna — A trans girl who is close friends with Ryder and uses sign language, acting as his interpreter.
- Ryder — Trans boy who describes himself as a "gender smoothie."
- Aidan — Trans boy with strong opinions who often disagrees with Stephie. Even so, Stephie later begins to act kindheartedly toward him.
- Myrick — Trans boy who claimed he is white passing and uses he/his pronouns. He is a member of the Gender Pirates, along with Stephie, Ciel and Milena.
- Eirikur — An Icelandic student who is in the same class as Ciel and Stephie. He is a cisgender boy.
- Frank — A cisgender boy in the same class as Stephie and Ciel. He is the boyfriend of Stephie.
- Feyrouz — Mother of Hamza and a Muslim woman. She is dating Alice, Martin's ex-wife.

== Release ==
Labelle said that while working with transgender children, she "noticed how negative everything we tell them about their own body is, so I wanted to create a character that could respond to all those horrible things trans kids hear all the time." She also has made educational guides to go along with the comics, promoting safer spaces for trans youth. In another interview, Labelle said the format of the webcomic allows her to "reach a lot of trans and gender non-conforming people." She added that she is inspired by Allison Bechdel's Dykes to Watch Out For and Fun Home. Elsewhere she said that most of the comic's cast is neurodivergent since she is on the autism spectrum herself and that she uses hateful comments as some of the material for her comics. The comic began on September 13, 2014.

In December 2015, Labelle participated in a holiday illustration featuring Stephie and trans protagonists of other webcomics like Rain in Rain, Zoë in Venus Envy, Jess & Seb in 2punk4you, Carrie & Allison in Closetspace, and Jesska in Manic Pixie Nightmare Girls.

By April 2017, the comic was getting "half-a-million visits a week." In May 2017, online trolls sent her death threats, leading her to cancel an event about the release of her book, Dating Tips for Trans and Queer Weirdos. Afterward, they hacked the page for the webcomic on the International Day Against Homophobia, Biphobia and Transphobia, and Facebook page, deleting three years of her work. She was also doxxed, with the attackers even contacting her workplace. In December 2017, she released a 36-page coloring book with LGBTQ themes titled Add Your Own Colors To The Rainbow!.

On January 3, 2019, the webcomic began to be published under the name of "Serious Trans Vibes" on Webtoon. It is still published on Webtoon. In March 2021, Labelle announced that she is writing a young adult novel focusing on two characters from the comic, Ciel and Stéphie, titled Wish Upon a Satellite, with two of the twenty chapters posted publicly, with others available through Patreon.

== Reception ==
The comic has been received positively by critics. Suzi Chase of the Washington Blade called the webcomic "hilarious" and said it shows transgender humour can be funny without being offensive. Tara Marie reviewed the comic for ComicsAlliance, writing that while there are "loose plot-lines," there are topical comic strips, and stated that the series has a "delicate touch." Marie described as equivalent to the Peanuts but queer-friendly, talking about queer youth, while still being soft, light, and welcoming. In The Solute, Tristan Nankervis said that the comic does not respect the basic "conventions of the medium" and said that while they "do mostly agree with" the "gender theory" in the comic, it "displays a worldview," specifically focusing on trans feelings. Kevin Dennison reviewed the comic positively, praising how it addresses issues that intersex, gender non-conforming, and trans people face, and providing "numerous educational strips" which introduce people to those issues.

In a Masters of Arts thesis, Katelynn Phillips said that the comics are often humorous, drawing out "the ridiculous and problematic approaches of cis/heteronormative thinking" and argued that readers of the comic must embrace a "queer vision of childhood" where Stephie and other characters are more complex than how children are often portrayed societally.She further said that the comic shows that children are more thoughtful than seen by mainstream society, calls for changed conceptions of girlhood, boyhood, and accepting non-binary people, while pointing to sources of trauma that trans people face and noting that the comic is "filled with ridicule and sarcasm."

== See also ==
- List of fictional trans characters
- List of webcomics with LGBT characters
- Venus Envy
- Rain
