= Being Emily =

2012 novel by Rachel Gold

- Author: Rachel Gold
- Cover artist: Kristin Smith
- Language: English
- Genre: Young adult
- Publisher: Bella Books
- Publication date: 2012
- Publication place: United States
- Media type: Print and mobile
- Pages: 264
- ISBN: 978-1594932830

Being Emily is a 2012 novel by Rachel Gold. It is the first traditionally published young adult novel written from a transgender girl's point of view. Being Emily won a Goldie Award for Dramatic General Fiction and was a finalist for the Lambda Literary Award for Transgender Fiction. Gold did not identify as trans when writing the book but since has identified as nonbinary.

== Plot ==
In the story, Emily is a trans teen girl from Minnesota whose family, girlfriend, and therapist are unsupportive of her and downplay her gender dysphoria. After she befriends Natalie, another trans girl, and starts working with an understanding therapist, she begins to come out.

Some chapters are written from the perspective of Emily's girlfriend, Claire, who initially struggles to accept Emily due to the norms Claire has come to believe from her religion and society. Claire starts to understand Emily's gender identity and connect with the trans community over the course of the book, in part by studying the Bible. Emily later comes out to her parents with the help of her new therapist, although the process is hard.

== Development ==
Gold has a Bachelor of Arts in English and Religious Studies from Macalester College and a Master of Fine Arts in Writing from Hamline University. They spent seven years as a print reporter in the LGBTQ community, stating that the trans women they befriended in that role helped inspire Being Emily. Gold later worked in marketing before returning to Macalester as an English professor.

Gold said that they devoted much of the book to explaining trans concepts to cisgender readers because at the time it was published, most non-trans people were new to understanding LGBTQ identities and trans topics.

== Publication ==
Bella Books, an indie publisher that focuses on literature about queer women, published Being Emily. Gold appreciated that Bella Books supported trans people in the lesbian community. They initially shared the book with an editor at a Big Five publisher but were told the book was too niche for the press. Mainstream publishers eventually released their first YA novel by and about a trans person in 2016: If I Was Your Girl by Meredith Russo.

By 2018, Gold felt that the trans community had evolved so much since 2012 that the book should be refreshed. Stephanie Burt introduced the second edition of Being Emily, published in 2018. She said in 2025 that a copy of Being Emily was the best book she had ever been given, and suggested to readers: "Consider giving it to a trans girl near you!" The new edition used updated terminology and referred to more recent scientific understanding of gender during childhood.

== Reception ==
Lydia Harris describes the novel as "extraordinarily poignant" and says that "the chapters chronicling [Emily's friend] Claire's struggles with religious, emotional and social mores are worth the price of this novel alone." Clarence Harlan Orsi, reviewing the field of YA fiction for its treatment of trans characters, compares Being Emily to Parrotfish and If I Was Your Girl in the Los Angeles Review of Books. He states that this genre tends to emphasize an inner goodness and normalcy for all their trans characters in rote ways. Orsi analyzes the portrayal of "normalcy" in these books as involving "performing the conventions of one’s chosen gender, affecting compliance with (rather than rebellion against) family and other authorities, and often (though not exclusively) becoming heterosexual."

Being Emily won the 2013 Goldie Award for Dramatic General Fiction. It was also a finalist for the 2013 Lambda Literary Award for Transgender Fiction.

== See also ==
- Transgender and transsexual fiction
