= Crystal Frasier =

American artist and game designer

- Education: New College of Florida; Art Institute of Seattle
- Notable work: Pathfinder Roleplaying Game; Venus Envy

Crystal Frasier is an American artist, author and game designer. She is known for her work on the Pathfinder Roleplaying Game, as well as being the author of the webcomic Venus Envy, which features a trans woman as a protagonist, and the graphic novel Cheer Up: Love and Pompoms.

== Early life ==
Crystal Frasier grew up in a small town in Florida, where she spent her spare time watching television, reading, and playing with her Ninja Turtles or stuffed animals. In elementary school, she started writing stories and drawing comics, continuing this in junior high school, where she drew comics for the school's newspaper.

She unexpectedly fell into role-playing games when she mail-ordered Teenage Mutant Ninja Turtles and Other Strangeness, thinking it was a novel, only to discover it was the RPG created by Palladium Books. From there, Frasier started playing other role-playing games created by Palladium, and eventually started playing Dungeons & Dragons.

In high school, she wrote Sailor Moon fan fiction, began running a gaming blog, and wrote her first paid article for a fan magazine published by Palladium Books. When Palladium dropped her as a freelancer, Frasier decided to concentrate on art rather than writing.

She graduated from the Art Institute of Seattle and the New College of Florida.

== Career ==
=== Web comic creator ===
In December 2001, Frasier created the webcomic Venus Envy under the name "Erin Lindsey." In addition to dealing with the themes of transgender people and gender transition, the strip also deals with other themes such as adolescence in general, William Shakespeare and women's soccer. Laura Seabrook, in a review for Polare, called the comic "really important", and praised the protagonist as a well-rounded, believable character, accompanied by a consistent and well-done supporting cast. Venus Envy ran until 2014.

=== Paizo: artist ===
In 2009, Frasier joined the art and layout department of Paizo Inc. as an intern so she could learn graphic design. She worked in the art department until 2014.

=== Paizo: game developer ===
In 2015, Frasier left the art department and became a game developer for Paizo. Amongst other projects, she created Shardra Geltl, the Pathfinder Roleplaying Game's first transgender iconic character. She also worked on comic books based on Pathfinder, like the Spiral of Bones and Dynamite series.

In June 2015, she and Jenn Dolari also received notice for the creation of a meme featuring transgender people based on the Vanity Fair cover featuring Caitlyn Jenner.

In 2016, Frasier was announced as a Gen Con Industry Insider Featured Presenter. In 2018, she left the Paizo game developing team to "focus on her freelancing career."

=== Freelancer ===
Frasier left Paizo to pursue a career as freelance author, editor and artist. She contacted Green Ronin Publishing about the lack of trans-gender characters in their upcoming second edition of the fantasy romance RPG Blue Rose, and this resulted in a good deal of work for Green Ronin, including becoming the Line Developer for the latest edition of Mutants & Masterminds. Her adventure design credits include The Harrowing and In Hell's Bright Shadow.

In August 2019, Frasier participated in the game designer panel "Playing with Identity: Tabletop Role-Playing Games and the Queer Power Self-Definition" at Flame Con about the impacts of queer identity on game design and play.

Frasier collaborated with Val Wise to create the graphic novel Cheer Up!: Love and Pompoms, published by Oni-Lion Forge, and described by Barnes & Noble as a "sweet, queer teen romance perfect for fans of Fence and Check Please!."

Mimi Koehler called the book "a heartfelt, quick-paced, sweet, and super diverse graphic novel", noting that it manages "to pack a lot within those pages—from diverse representation, a sapphic love story (with the unbeatable trope best-friends-to-enemies-to-friends-to-lovers) to representations of transphobic microaggressions and teammates becoming friends for life." The book won the 2022 GLAAD Media Award for Outstanding Graphic Novel/Anthology and was a finalist for the 2022 Lambda Literary Award for LGBTQ+ Comics.

In February 2021, DC Comics announced that Frasier would be one of the writers for the Love Is a Battlefield special, working with Juan Gedeon on a story where Wonder Woman and Steve Trevor have a "date night that inevitably takes a superheroic turn."

In March 2021, Marvel Comics announced she would be a co-writer with Al Ewing of a comic series titled Gamma Flight, illustrated by Lan Medina. Frasier had previously worked with Ewing in 2020 on the series The Immortal Hulk.

Frasier was also co-author of the D&D sourcebook Van Richten's Guide to Ravenloft published in 2021.

== Personal life ==
After hiding her identity during her first years at Paizo, Frasier came out as a trans woman following her transition, as she had no community to connect with, and wanted to help other trans people at that point. In November 2020, she tweeted that she was also intersex.
