= Venus Envy (webcomic) =

Webcomic by Crystal Frasier

- Author: Crystal Frasier
- Website: http://venusenvycomic.com/
- Current status/schedule: Concluded
- Launch date: December 1, 2001
- End date: January 30, 2014
- Genre(s): Dramedy, Slice-of-life

Venus Envy is a webcomic written and drawn by Crystal Frasier (Note: When the comic was released, she used the name "Erin Lindsey," with the fact she is the author of the webcomic confirmed by various tweets from her account on the topic.) beginning on 6 November 2001 and running as a serialized comic from 1 December 2001 to 30 January 2014. The comic was updated daily on Frasier's personal website. It follows Zoë, a 16-year-old trans woman who is beginning her gender transition. In addition to dealing with themes of transgender people and transition, the strip also serves as a coming-of-age story, and prominently features Zoë's interests such as William Shakespeare and women's soccer.

== Plot ==
Zoë Carter has severe depression and is sent to therapy after telling her parents that she wants to transition. This causes problems in her home town of Punxsutawney, so the family relocates to the fictional town of Salem to begin a new life.

== Characters ==
=== Main characters ===
- Zoë Alexis Carter - The 16-year-old protagonist of the webcomic begun her transition to a woman at the age of 15. She has begun hormone replacement therapy and feminizes her voice via voice training. She is often anxious and irritable, but makes friends at Salem High School. She also has red hair and is bisexual.
- Larson Delgado - A Latino trans man who is school friends with Zoë. His transition mirrors Zoë's as he is also on hormone replacement therapy. His parents do not mind his transition, and he often wears chest binders.
- Lisa van Gogh - A lesbian teen who is school friends with Zoë. She is on the soccer team, which is filled with other lesbians. Lisa is comfortable with her own sexual identity.
- Nina dell' Abade - A friend of Zoë who is bisexual and a theatre kid.
- Eric Smith - Runs a secret social club. He was in a romantic relationship with Zoë, and was groomed by Grace.
- Brianna Michaels - A student who goes to Salem High School. She frequently claims she is a psychic, and she is skilled at ballet.
- Grace Allen - The head of the school Casanova Society. She is an actress, and is deemed psychopathic as well as psychologically manipulative.

=== Supporting characters ===
- Robert Carter - A Jewish professor of English literature and the overprotective father of Zoë.
- Helen Carter - An anesthesiologist and the mother of Zoë. She is overbearing, and refuses to see Zoë as a woman.
- Chris/tine - A crossdresser.

== Release ==
Frasier has stated that the title of the comics comes from a conversation with her roommate, and has noted that the title is also used on a novel of the same name by Rita Mae Brown. Frasier states that the name itself is a comical take on the term "penis envy".

Frasier said she was inspired to begin the comic, after reading Garfield, Sluggy Freelance, and being encouraged by her roommate to put it online. Frasier also said that she was inspired by the webcomic Real Life and that the webcomic would not have existed without Jennifer Lynn's Antijen Pages, a resource for trans people. (Note: This comes from tweets by Frasier in June 2020 and October 2020) She has stated that the comic came out "by accident", developed in a newspaper style with three to four panels in a single row, with each strip made on sheets of sketch paper. The first panels of the comic were posted on November 6, 2001, but the comic did not begin serialization until December 1, 2001. She notes that the first weeks of the comic lacked any intended plot, and was instead intended to be an episodic comedy.

The symbol featured on one of Zoë's shirts represents trans women, and was designed by Matt Nishii.

By 2003, the independent comic had at least 150,000 daily visitors. In a September 2004 interview, Frasier said she had the story of the entire series planned out with occasional subplots, such as in "Unholy Alliance", where a lesbian separatist asks a male cross dresser out on a date. Venus Envy received occasional fan mail, and was extremely popular on Keenspace. In November 2004, Frasier ran a comic expressing her dissatisfaction with the results of the 2004 United States elections, leading to backlash from certain readers In 2006, it was said that the webcomic had grown into "a vocation that includes public speaking and organizing about transgender and queer issues" for Frasier. The last issue of the webcomic posted on January 30, 2014. In May 2019, Frasier floated the idea of rebooting the comic as a graphic novel.

== Spin-off and crossovers ==
In 2004, Fraiser convinced Sherri Belmar to write a spinoff science fiction webcomic titled Venus Ascending, with some of the same characters, like Zoë, Lisa, Larson, Chris/tine, and a new character (Kim Tim). Some reviews called it a "trans gag strip" with a "loose storyline".

In 2011, Frasier did a crossover with Evelyn Poor's webcomic, Trans Girl Diaries. (Note: All 303 pages of Trans Girl Diaries can be read on the Internet Archive.)

In December 2015, Frasier contributed to a holiday illustration featuring Zoë alongside trans protagonists of Jessica Durling's 2punk4you (Jess & Seb), Jenn Dolari's Closetspace (Carrie & Allison), Jessica Udischas's Manic Pixie Nightmare Girls (Jesska), Sophie Labelle's Assigned Male (Stephie), and Jocelyn Samara DiDomenick's Rain (Rain).

== Reception ==
Laura Seabrook, in a review for Polare, called the comic "really important", praising Zoe as a well-rounded, believable character, accompanied by a consistent and well-done supporting cast.

The comic was later cited as an inspiration by Alexandra Pitchford, the author of the webcomic Bitz, and by Evelyn Poor, who created Trans Girl Diaries.
