= Cheer Up: Love and Pompoms =

2021 graphic novel by Crystal Frasier

- First edition
- Author: Crystal Frasier
- Illustrator: Val Wise; Oscar O. Jupiter (lettering)
- Language: English
- Genre: Graphic novel; Young adult fiction
- Publisher: Oni Press
- Publication date: August 10, 2021
- Publication place: United States
- Pages: 128
- ISBN: 978-1-62010-955-7

Cheer Up: Love and Pompoms, sometimes stylized as Cheer Up!, is a young adult graphic novel written by Crystal Frasier, with art by Val Wise and lettering by Oscar Jupiter. Published on August 10, 2021, by Oni Press, it tells the story of two queer high school girls, Beatrice – who is transgender – and Annie, as they try to become cheerleaders.

Cheer Up was received positively by critics, who praised the variety in the type of characters and how Fraiser conveyed the issues and challenges of being a teenage transgender girl. The novel was also a finalist in the 34th Lambda Literary Awards.

== Reception ==
A review published by Kirkus Reviews noted the story is less focused on the coming out aspect of the main characters and more on the daily difficulties faced by transgender youth, which is done "simply and sweetly." The reviewer also praised the art, calling it "cute and expressive, with tons of personality," and noted the characters are varied both in body types and gender identities.

Publishers Weekly opened its reviews by saying Cheer Up works around stereotypes of high school novels and is able to give "a nuanced portrait of queer cheerleaders." They further note how Frasier's graphic novel deals with the difference between "queer rights and real acceptance." Of the art, they praised Wise's illustrations, which helped build the characters' personalities.

Sarah Rice, reviewing for Booklist, commented on the graphic novel's similarity to Ngozi Ukazu's Check, Please!, as both have "similar notes of sweetness and heart," and focus more on the characters' relationships instead of the sports in which they partake. Rice praised Wise's illustrations as containing a wide variety of characters, all "wonderfully realistic and expressive."

In January 2022, the book was nominated for a GLAAD Media Awards in the GLAAD Media Award for Outstanding Graphic Novel/Anthology category. The book would successfully win the award at the 33rd GLAAD Media Awards ceremony in April 2022. Cheer Up was also announced as one of the finalists of the 34th Lambda Literary Awards in March 2022, in the Comics category.
