= Trans Girl Next Door =

2013 webcomic

- Wu's character checking her tuck
- Author: Kylie Summer Wu
- Website: http://www.transgirlnextdoor.com/
- Current status/schedule: Ongoing
- Launch date: November 2013
- Genre(s): Autobiography, LGBT

Trans Girl Next Door is an autobiographical webcomic by Kylie Summer Wu, documenting her transition as a transgender woman. Wu started her webcomic shortly after starting her transition in 2013 in order to express and process her feelings. Trans Girl Next Door covers Wu's transition, her love life, and the more mundane parts of her life. Wu was listed in the Trans 100 in 2015 for her webcomic.

== Synopsis ==
Trans Girl Next Door is a slice-of-life series of episodic comic strips documenting Wu's life as a young transgender California surfer girl. Besides documenting Wu's gender transition, the webcomic also covers her love life as well as more mundane aspects of life. Though the webcomic deals with topics such as body dysmorphia, anti-transgender bills, discrimination, and body issues, it does so via humor. Wu doesn't shy away from tragic stories that lack a funny angle; after the death of Leelah Alcorn in 2014, Wu wrote about how devastating she found the situation. Regardless, Autostraddle described Trans Girl Next Door as "sugary sweet, almost to the point of being saccharine, but not quite there."

== Development ==
Kylie Wu grew up in China and moved to the Washington D.C. metro area as a teenager, before moving again to West Los Angeles. Here, she went to CalArts and to study Character Animation. Wu stated that the various short comedy webcomics available to her inspired her to create her own, and that her undiagnosed ADHD encourages her to keep her own comic strips short. Trans Girl Next Door is posted primarily on microblogging website Tumblr, which Wu stated she found easy to use. Wu began her gender transition shortly before launching her webcomic. In an interview with Bustle.com, Wu stated that after she started her transition, she "naturally gravitated towards drawing comics to have a creative outlet to express myself and process all my feelings." After Trans Girl Next Door launched in late 2013, the webcomic has gained a large fanbase and it has been translated in various languages.

In 2014, Wu stated that she was planning to publish a physical release of her webcomic in the form of a comic book and that she would like to create animated shorts as well, though she noted that the latter would use up a large amount of time and that paying rent came first. Wu is financially supported through Patreon.

== Impact ==
In 2015, Kylie Wu was listed in the Trans 100 and was listed by Elite Daily as among "prominent millennials making a difference in the transgender community." Trans Girl Next Door was syndicated in SF Weekly in 2016 as part of Transgender Awareness Month.
