= Rain (webcomic) =

Slice-of-life webcomic

- Cover of volume five, showing characters Fara Bryer (left), Rain Flaherty (centre), and Emily Caston (right).
- Author: Jocelyn Samara DiDomenick
- Website: https://rain.thecomicseries.com/archive
- Launch date: 28 November 2010
- End date: 15 April 2022
- Genre(s): Dramedy, slice-of-life

Rain is a slice-of-life webcomic first published in November 2010 by Jocelyn Samara DiDomenick. It follows a teenage transgender girl named Rain Flaherty as she attends a private Catholic high school. In 2013, volume one of Rain was published in a book format. (Note: It had ISBN 978-0578119847. Since then, six more volumes have been self-published by DiDomenick through Lulu. The seventh and final volume was published in 2026.)

== Plot ==
Rain Flaherty, a trans girl, moves away from her hometown to live with her aunt, Fara Bryer. Bryer is a teacher at St. Hallvard High School, a private Catholic high school with conservative beliefs, where Rain enrolls. Rain is finally ready to present solely feminine in public and try her best to hide that she's trans; however, she encounters childhood friend Gavin Kurz, who knew her when she was still presenting masculine. To further complicate matters, she meets siblings Maria and Rudy Strongwell who are closeted and openly queer respectively. The comics follow the character's lives as they discover their identity and overcome the challenges that come with it.

== Structure ==
The webcomic consists of 44 chapters spanning a total of 1,382 story pages. During its run, it updated three times a week, with pages which were typically 4 to 6 panels each. During times when the story updates were delayed, there were "Rain Delay" pages. These pages are non-canon parody pages in the style of 4Koma Comics. There were also "Special" pages, which would include miscellaneous content, such as teasers for the physical books or fanart drawn by the author.

== Characters ==
=== Rain and her family ===
- Rain Flaherty - A teenage trans girl in her senior year of upper secondary school, Rain moves from her hometown and enrolls at St. Hallvard's High School to have a fresh start presenting feminine. Rain is the youngest of three siblings. She is a fan of Black Wings: Kaminari, an in-universe manga series. After briefly dating Rudy Strongwell, she realizes that she is a lesbian, and later starts dating Emily Caston. At the end of the series, she changes her name to Liriel Rain Bryer, taking her aunt's last name and her father's deadname.
- Fara Bryer - Rain's aunt on her mother's side, and an art teacher at St. Hallvard's High School. Fara is bisexual, and dated Vincent Valverde when he was still presenting as a woman.
- Kellen Flaherty - Rain's older sister. Kellen does not accept Rain’s identity and continually deadnames her. Rain disowns Kellen after she forcibly cuts Rain's hair while Rain is asleep. Kellen has a twin, Aiken.
- Aiken Flaherty - Rain's older brother. Aikien initially did not accept Rain’s identity but later came around to support her. He once dated Jessica Li, a trans woman, and reacted badly when he discovered that she was trans. Since Rain came out, however, he’s worked to reconcile with her. Aiken has a twin, Kellen.
- Liriel Flaherty - Rain's mother, who dies before the main events of the series, causing Rain to live with her aunt Fara. At the end of the series, it is revealed that she actually was a closeted trans man, using the name Lorcan. Rain takes Lorcan's deadname after learning this.

=== St. Hallvard's High School ===
- Gavin Kurz - Rain's childhood friend. He initially does not accept Rain, but eventually comes to support her.
- Maria Strongwell - Rudy's sister. She is an initially closeted lesbian, before later coming out in front of the entire school.
- Rudy Strongwell - Maria's brother. He is openly gay, causing conflict with his disapproving parents. Rudy occasionally cross-dresses as Ruby.
- Emily Caston - Rain's classmate. Emily is initially presented as a mean popular girl. However, it is later revealed that Emily has an abusive mother and is pregnant by her ex-boyfriend. Emily comes to support Rain when the latter becomes estranged from her siblings. She eventually comes out as pansexual, and begins dating Rain.
- Arthur Feltman - A Catholic priest and the Dean of Students at St. Hallvard's. He is supportive of Rain and has an estranged younger brother Will, who is trans. Arthur helps Rain partly as a way to reconcile with his brother.
- Quenton Morrison - A Catholic priest and the Headmaster at St. Hallvard's. He is a major antagonist in the story, and is homophobic and transphobic. Quenton is eventually fired and replaced with Arthur Feltman as the interim headmaster.

=== Other characters ===
- Jessica Li - A trans woman and Aiken Flaherty's former girlfriend. Jessica met Aiken through an online dating service. When she came out as trans to Aiken, he broke up with her. Jessica makes up with Aiken and agrees to try being friends again when she sees him making an effort not to deadname or misgender her or Rain in a conversation with Kellen.
- Vincent Valverde - A trans man who is Rain and Jessica's therapist. He was also Fara Bryer's former partner back when he presented as feminine.
- Lydia Wynn Caston - Rain and Emily's daughter.
- Ky/Kylie Coven - Ky is a student at another school and a friend of the St. Hallvard's cast. They identify as genderfluid.
- Heather Coven - Heather is Ky's older sister and roommate. Heather mainly interacts with Jessica and Fara, and gradually comes to accept her younger sibling for who they are.

== Releases ==
November 27, 2010 – teaser for the comic is released

November 28, 2010 – the first strip is released

August 23, 2012 – a physical copy of the first volume of the comic is published. Subsequent volumes would release in 2014, 2015, 2017, 2018, 2022 and 2026.

December 2015 – a collaboration releases that features Rain alongside trans protagonists of many other webcomics, like Zoë in Venus Envy, Jess & Seb in 2punk4you, Carrie & Allison in Closetspace, Jesska in Manic Pixie Nightmare Girls and Stephie in Assigned Male

March 20, 2021 – an official French translation of the comic is released. The translation has since been abandoned.

March 15, 2022 – the author announces that series had ended and that she would begin work on two other webcomics soon. Moonlight Wanderers is yet to be released and is currently in development.

December 5, 2022 – the author releases My Impossible Soulmate, a standalone prequel to Rain

== Adaptations ==
=== Animated series ===
In December 2020, DiDomenick linked to a teaser trailer for an animated series of Rain, announcing that one was in production. Larissa Logan Robin Frost, also known by their handle LariUmbreon, announced that she would be voicing Rain in a post on Reddit. The official YouTube channel for the series described it as a "story for boys, girls, and everyone in between."

In January 2021, DiDomenick revealed on Twitter that she had done "very little besides provide the story and character designs the animation is based on". On September 14, 2021, in a video re-upload of an instrumental track coupled with animation for the series, LariUmbreon announced the series cancellation, but did not specify the reason.

In April 2022, LariUmbreon, using the name "Robin", announced that the full animated adaption of Rain was discontinued but that she would continue posting short animated clips, linking to a crowdfunding campaign on Patreon. She included a 14-page description of what happened and why the full animated adaptation was discontinued.

== Reception ==
In TRANSforming Spaces: Transgender Webcomics as a Model for Transgender Empowerment and Representation within Library and Archive Spaces, Nami K. R. Hatfield (2015) argues that Rain derives its effectiveness from its "informed and sympathetic portrayal of transgender experiences", and notes that DiDomenick uses "the participatory methods of organized fandom" in order to interact with Rain's readers and fanbase. Participatory culture (a new media theory concept developed by scholar Henry Jenkins) in the Internet age, Hatfield contends, is precisely what makes Rain a reality - it enables smaller-scale works centred around non-mainstream experiences such as the trans experience to be shared easily.

The Boston Public Library ranks Rain at number 22 on a list of 31 comics to binge whilst stuck at home. Michele Kirichanskaya of ComicsVerse ranks it at number 2 on their list of 10 must-read LGBTQIA+ webcomics, praising its chibi art style whilst noting its initial lack of racial diversity. Librarian and folkorist Charlie McNabb described Rain as a "slice-of-life webcomic about a trans girl" and noted that the comic has a genderfluid character.
