= Cucumber Quest =

Adventure webcomic by Gigi D.G.

- Cover art for the Kickstarter edition of the first print volume
- Author: Gigi D.G
- Website: cucumber.gigidigi.com
- Launch date: April 3, 2011
- Genre(s): Adventure, comedy, parody, fantasy

Cucumber Quest is an adventure webcomic written and illustrated by Gigi D.G. It follows Cucumber and his sister, Almond, as they travel through the fictional world of Dreamside to defeat the Nightmare Knight. The comic began publication on April 3, 2011, and has been released in several print volumes funded through crowdfunding.

== Plot and setting ==
Clockwise from top: Carrot, Nautilus, Cucumber, Almond.

Cucumber Quest follows Cucumber, a young boy who wants to attend magic school but must help save Dreamside from the Nightmare Knight after his father is captured. He travels with his sister Almond, Sir Carrot, and Princess Nautilus to collect the signatures of the princesses of Dreamside's six kingdoms.

== Development ==
In an interview with io9, Gigi D.G. said that the initial idea for Cucumber Quest developed from playing video games during childhood. The comic uses the structure of a hero's journey, which allowed D.G. to challenge reader expectations and incorporate humor into the story.

In 2012, Gigi D.G. launched a Kickstarter campaign with a goal of 10,000 USD to self-publish the first volume of Cucumber Quest. The campaign raised 62,953 USD. In October 2017, First Second Books began publishing a new physical release of Cucumber Quest.

In 2016, Gigi D.G. created a one-shot webcomic titled Lady of the Shard. The infinite canvas webcomic uses a palette limited to two or three colors at a time and was included in ComicsAlliance's 2016 list of outstanding cartoonists.

In 2019, Gigi D.G. announced plans to discontinue Cucumber Quest as a comic and conclude the story in an illustrated script format, citing changes in their personal circumstances.

== Reception ==
Larry Cruz of Comic Book Resources praised the comic's humor and visual style and recommended it for its artwork. Lauren Davis of io9 described the comic as suitable for children while also containing moments that raise questions for adult readers.

Davis included Cucumber Quest in an io9 list of webcomics considered overlooked by the Eisner Awards. Davis also included it in a list of webcomics considered suitable for television adaptation, suggesting that it would fit alongside animated series such as Adventure Time and Steven Universe.. Louie Zong, a storyboard artist for the Cartoon Network series We Bare Bears, said that reading Cucumber Quest inspired him to become an artist.
