= Julia Kaye =

American artist and illustrator

- Born: June 15, 1988 (age 38)
- Occupations: Artist, illustrator, voice actress
- Years active: 2013–present
- Notable work: Up and Out; Super Late Bloomer
- Website: www.juliakaye.com

Julia Evelyn Kaye (born June 15, 1988) is an American artist, illustrator, and voice actress. Kaye currently works as a storyboard artist and revisionist at Disney Television Animation, and is the creator of the webcomic Up and Out. She has also done work for Maxim, Cosmopolitan, BuzzFeed, GoComics, College Humor, along with other graphic design work. She provided the voice of Snapdragon in the animated series High Guardian Spice.

== Personal life ==
Kaye is transgender and was raised in San Jose, California. She is currently based in Los Angeles. She is Jewish.

== Recognition ==
Julia Kaye was nominated for Outstanding Collection by the Ignatz Awards in 2018 for Up and Out.

== Works ==
=== Up and Out ===
Up and Out was started in May 2013, but it wasn't until October 2016 that her comic series began to focus on experiences specific to her transition. She originally intended for her autobiographical comics to remain unreleased, but she saw her online following for gag comic strips as a chance to raise awareness about the experience of transgender individuals. Her comics also aim to provide content for transgender individuals and others questioning their gender identity to connect with. The comics share her major milestones as a trans woman, while also documenting her moments of insecurity and self-doubt. The three-panel comics cover a variety of topics, such as the experience of being misgendered and undergoing hormone replacement therapy, while utilizing a range of tones from comedic to serious.

Kaye's comic is updated every Thursday on her website and various social media accounts that include Tumblr, Instagram, and Twitter. She originally started posting the comic on her Twitter in July 2016. The comic was first posted on Instagram in October 2016.

=== Super Late Bloomer: My Early Days in Transition ===

Kaye's first collection of comics was released on May 1, 2018. The comics tell her story through her first year on hormone replacement therapy and her social, physical, and mental changes during that time.

Publishers Weekly called it "blunt yet precise; straightforward but nuanced; simple but beautiful. ... Kaye skillfully and effectively relates the daily indignities borne by trans women and the triumphs and quiet joys as well. Her tenacity in this hopeful story will be resonant for readers going through personal transitions of many kinds."

=== My Life in Transition: A Super Late Bloomer Collection ===
Kaye's second collection of comics was released on February 1, 2021. They follow Julia's life now three years into her transition journey.

== Television credits ==
From IMDB
Year	Title	Credited Role
2018–2022	Big City Greens	Storyboard revisionist, Storyboard artist on "Chipwrecked"
2021	High Guardian Spice	Voice Actor, as Snapdragon
2024	Jellystone!	Storyboard artist
