= Go Get a Roomie! =

Comic strip

- Panel from "Pure Logic."
- Author: Clover
- Website: GoGetARoomie.com
- Current status/schedule: Mondays, Wednesdays, and Fridays
- Launch date: May 2010
- Genre(s): Sex comedy, LGBT

Go Get a Roomie! (often abbreviated as GGaR) is a webcomic created by artist Clover. It was started on May 8, 2010, and ended on December 25 2020. The comic is described as following "the wild adventures of an upbeat hippie, living her life in love and joy." (Prior to 2012 this was "Life, Love, and Beer") New comics were added three times a week, with updates on Monday, Wednesday and Friday, until the comic's conclusion, having amassed 1461 pages.

== Story ==
Go Get a Roomie! primarily focuses on the titular free-spirited and sexually active young woman who goes by the nickname of "Roomie". Roomie lives on no apparent income by staying with various friends and partners, with most of the comic's material prior to chapter 14 stemming from such ventures, particularly in the first two chapters. Her extroverted and sociable character is juxtaposed with the co-star of the strip, Lillian - an introvert whose preferred activity is sleeping/dreaming; though, since meeting Roomie this has somewhat changed to storytelling and writing. Over the course of the comic, the characters grow a fond relationship that goes from friends to lovers. As they do, they learn to live more complete lives, with Roomie developing a healthier and more domestic lifestyle whilst Lillian learns to be more social and outgoing.

Besides the two main characters, the comic also features a wide and diverse cast of characters that interact on a secondary level with each other, primarily at the setting of Jo's Bar (collectively dubbed "Jo Kids" by Lillian later). The tone of the comic is occasionally overtly sexual, but is not pornographic in nature. The story's focus is on personal growth through the relationships between the characters in a slice of life-type fashion. Individual chapters and story arcs are interspersed with "story time" or "dreaming" chapters, out-of-genre excerpts created by Lillian, and either presented as her dreams or as the stories she writes or shares with Roomie, Ram, and Richard; such as the recurring "Knight In Furs."

== Art style ==
Most strips are illustrated using little color, in a theme known as "French Grays", depending on line-work and shading to convey particular mood and character expression. The strips are normally presented in a traditional four-panel horizontal arrangement; some special comics, however, such as Lillian's dreams, will take a less confined style of portrayal. Such strips have been known to feature pencil sketches, or to deviate radically from the French grey color palette to denote them as dreams separate from the main story flow. From October 2 onwards, the comic switched from digital drawings to handmade drawings.

== Primary characters ==
- Roomie is the strip's title character. Her real name has not been revealed in the comic, nor her exact age discussed, but she appears to be in her early- to mid-twenties. Roomie is characterized as confident, impulsive, free-spirited, sexually promiscuous, manipulative, highly extroverted, and energetic. The artist describes her by saying "The perky life-lover hippie. Most often seen in bars. If not, she’s likely to be in your house, already making herself comfy." Though she loves freely, she is disquieted when people actually fall in love with her since she can't give them what they desire. Beginning with chapter 18 Roomie has begun to confront a change in this pattern of her behavior after spending a few weeks previously wandering away from her friends. It is very likely Roomie is aromantic judging by how she doesn't understand romantic love, while being obsessed with platonic love. She was revealed to be completely pansexual who enjoys sexual relations both with men and women, but for some reason as she admitted can't form romantic relationship with men.
- Lillian Tallis is the second main character of the story, and is commonly referred to by Roomie as "L.T.". Originally this stood for "Lazy Tyke", a nickname given by Lillian's brother, but Roomie has since christened Lillian with a variety of other nicknames beginning with the letters L and T. She is described by the author as "unaffected by Roomie’s charm, all Lillian wants is a good sleep and her lucid dreams. She might not often show it, but she does care for Roomie." Appearing as a contrast to Roomie, Lillian is a highly introverted and openly lazy woman. Lillian spends a lot of time in the story sleeping, allowing the artist to freely explore her dreams. Lillian's dreams are portrayed as a surreal but lucid environment in which she holds a great deal of control. Characters in the dream are often characters from the strip placed in different roles. As of chapter 14, Lillian has begun to write down the contents of her dreaming with an eye towards becoming an author. She goes so far as to purchase a very expensive laptop; the laptop itself is an objet d'art strongly resembling a Datamancer piece. She was revealed to have been in relationship with Matt, also she had a crush on Steve as a kid.

== Secondary characters ==
- Richard is a young male character who is openly sexually submissive. He wears a collar around his neck and a T-shirt embellished with the word "Bitch". As the series has progressed, Richard has more openly worn fetish attire in public. Beginning in chapter 15, Richard and his twin, Ram, have moved in with LT and Roomie, forming a sort of found family unit after their biological parents, who have qualms with their BDSM lifestyle, become difficult to deal with upon finding out their older daughter is involved in a poly-amorous relationship. Richard develops a romantic and non-sexual relationship with Watch, ultimately travelling abroad with him to meet Watch's family.
- Ram, initially female and using the name Ramona at the start of the comic, is the twin of Richard. He is proudly and openly dominant in his bisexuality. In addition to being dominant, he is also more sexually gregarious than his brother, like Roomie tending towards casual and open sexual encounters. He and Richard also have an older sister named Kris who is in a poly-amorous relationship. Richard and Ram are barely 21 years old, as mentioned in 439. Ram struggles with the roles expected from his assigned gender and eventually discovers that he is transgender. He then decides to transition, and changes his name to Ram.
- Mr. Kitteh is a black cat that lives with Lillian. Despite the name "Mr. Kitteh" (given to her by Roomie), she is actually female. She can frequently be found near Lillian, and is often a puppet or even co-conspirator in Roomie's antics.
- Jo is the owner and bartender of a Celtic-themed bar where Roomie and her friends spend much of their time. He tolerates their drunken, sexual antics and occasionally jokes about joining in (which is usually the fastest way to bring things to a halt and clear everyone out). Jo has been seen wearing a kilt and owning (at least) a battleaxe. Unlike the other characters, Jo is based on a real character from Clover's personal life.
- Matt first appeared early on in the comic as a new addition to Roomie's social circle. He was disappointed to discover that her drunken declaration of love didn't mean that she had feelings for him (as she "loves everyone"). He is unnerved by Roomie's frequent double entendres and jealous of her many sexual, yet uncommitted, relationships with those around her. It was revealed that Matt has had a previous relationship with Lillian, and he had sexually assaulted her. Matt eventually moves out of town and he and Lillian do not meet again.
- Aggie is one of Roomie's lovers, the first to be given a proper name. Like Matt, she was introduced early in the comic. Described as "kind, pretty and a tad possessive," she had previously promised not to fall in love with Roomie, only to do exactly that, much to Roomie's dismay. She was revealed as intersex person, and for a time questioned her own gender.
- Allan Tallis is Lillian's older brother and a passionate music lover. He is engaged to Evelyn, but sleeps with men occasionally. He is about five to seven years older than Lillian. At the beginning of the series Allan befriended Roomie with an eye towards her watching over his sister as he moved out of their shared house to begin life with his fiancé.
- Jak is one of Roomie's former lovers and also a transgender man, given the name Julia at birth. He and Gulden develop a strong romantic and sexual relationship.
- Evelyn is Allan's forthright and possessive fiancée. She tolerates his occasional casual relationship with Steve, but never fails to make it clear who Allan has really committed to spending his life with. In Lillian's dreams Evelyn often takes on dark connotations, as she initially viewed the woman as "stealing" her brother away. In the final chapter, Evelyn becomes pregnant and starts a family with both Steve and Allan.
- Steve is Allan's intermittent male lover. He is also a friend of Roomie and a regular at Jo's bar. Steve has a very gregarious and friendly personality and occasionally cohabits with Evelyn and Allan.
- Woc is a friend of Roomie's. Her name is actually an acronym standing for 'Wise Old Crone'. She is handicapped and moves in a wheelchair most of the time, but has a very philosophical view on things, including dreams (which immediately endears her to Lillian). Her real name is Manisa. At one point in the comic, Woc has taken Ram under her wing as a pottery apprentice, and has revealed her own life history, including her lesbian relationship of the past.
- The Boy (Watch) tends Woc's garden. He isn't mute, but chooses not to speak. He appears later in the comic strip in Lillian's dreams. His real name is as yet unknown. Beginning at the end of chapter 17, and expanding into chapter 18, The Boy is revealed to have some sort of medical condition which causes him occasionally to be hospitalized. Watch ultimately moves abroad to meet his family, taking Richard along with him.
- Gulden; thus dubbed by Roomie after Gulden Draak, the type of heady rich beer she most resembles, Gulden is a nymphomaniac and frequent patron of Jo's. She has more than once challenged Ram in the sexual arena, causing them both problems at university.

== Story/Dream Characters ==
- The Knight in Furs is a recurring character in Lillian's stories. She was once a noble human knight, but over time, her lust for fighting and her desire for the traditional chivalric/romantic life transformed her into a furry beast. She consequently began a quest to regain her humanity.
- Merlin is a reinterpretation on the classic character, also from The Knight in Furs stories; Merlin takes the form of a dark skinned wild woman with dreadlocks and a staff, and is usually mostly-naked. She, much like Roomie, can often be seen striking limber but bizarre poses in various panels.
- The Little One began as a sketch by the artist in her Deviant Art and Tumblr accounts but quickly became a new side-story as told by Lillian. Little One is a small, hooded, magical creature, and one of the most selfish beings in all the universe. It has retold an allegory which was a blend of Aesop's "The Dog and Its Reflection" parable and the tale of Narcissus, and later, in a holiday themed story, about how to spread warmth to others.
- Vince The first of Lillian's dreams to be shown in the story, Vince was represented as a knight in armor (or half a knight anyway, his legs had run off) who had presumably been a long-time dream companion of Lillian's. At the end of Chapter 5, Lillian is forced to choose between him or a dream-image of Roomie, and chooses Roomie, kissing the "sleeping princess" to awaken her and banishing Vince, seemingly permanently.

== Publication ==
The strip debuted online on May 8, 2010. In January 2013, building on the comic's growing popularity, the author held a Kickstarter campaign to create a book, which was highly successful. After concluding the campaign with over $90,000 in funding (far exceeding her original $20,000 goal), the author began working on her first book, which is expected to be 175 pages long and printed in full color. Although the project was successfully funded and expected to be completed and delivered in either March or May 2013 (softcover and hardback, respectively), as of February 2014 the rewards had not been sent. On March 4, 2014, the books began shipping.

As of March 2021, chapters 1 to 23 have been released in print in partnership with Hivemill.

== Awards ==
Go Get a Roomie! took top prize in the ComicMix Mix May Mayhem NSFW Webcomics Tournament in 2012, beating the well-known webcomic Oglaf and raising $500 for the Comic Book Legal Defense Fund in the final round.
