= Sophie Labelle =

Canadian writer and cartoonist

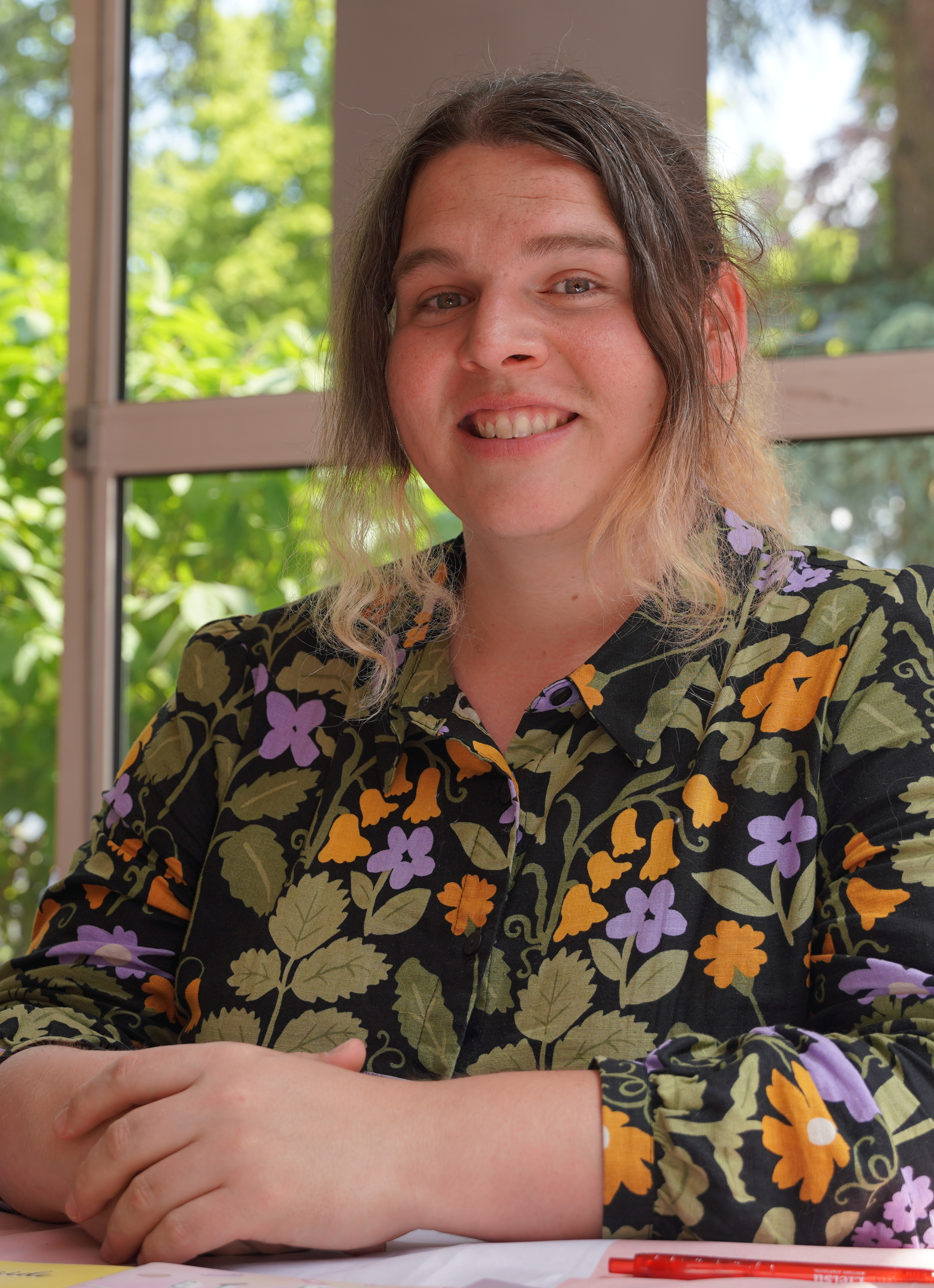
- Born: 22 April 1988 (age 38)
- Area: Cartoonist
- Notable works: Assigned Male

Sophie Labelle (born 22 April 1988) is a Canadian cartoonist, public speaker, and writer. She created the webcomic Assigned Male, which draws upon her experiences as a transgender child. She is an activist in the transgender rights movement, and speaks on the subjects of transgender history and transfeminism.

== Early life ==
Labelle grew up in rural Quebec, near Châteauguay. She worked as an elementary school teacher, and was the camp coordinator for Gender Creative Kids Canada.

== Career ==
Labelle is the author and illustrator of Assigned Male, a webcomic and series of zines addressing issues of gender norms and privilege. It features the character of 11-year-old Stephie, a transgender girl discovering and embracing her gender. Labelle said that while working with transgender children, she "noticed how negative everything we tell them about their own body is, so I wanted to create a character that could respond to all those horrible things trans kids hear all the time." She has made educational guides to go along with the comics, promoting safer spaces for transgender youth. The Washington Blade called the webcomic "hilarious" and said it shows transgender humour can be funny without being offensive.

Labelle has written several books and zines about gender identity and expression, including The Genderific Coloring Book, A Girl Like Any Other, Ciel at Camp Fabulous, and Gender Euphoria. The English translation of the second volume of the Ciel series, Ciel in All Directions (2020, Second Story Press) was named as a 2022 Bank Street Children's Book Committee's Best Books of the Year. She wrote the foreword to Tikva Wolf's book Ask me about Polyamory: The Best of Kimchi Cuddles. She has created trans-centered sex education materials for Trans Student Educational Resources.

In May 2017, Labelle released the comic book Dating Tips for Trans and Queer Weirdos. A scheduled launch at the bookstore Venus Envy in Halifax was cancelled after threats were made against both her and the store. She received death threats, her home address was posted in online forums, and her web site and social media accounts were compromised (leading her to take them offline temporarily). In the wake of the harassment, Labelle advocated for Canadian Bill C-16 to protect gender identity and expression, and for stronger laws against cyberbullying.

== Selected works ==
- "Ça déborde!" Un cahier de coloriage sur les genres et les sexes ("It's overflowing!" A coloring book about gender and sexes) (Des Ailes Sur Un Tracteur, 2015, ISBN 979-10-90286-26-9)
- The Best of Assigned Male (Jessica Kingsley Pub, 2021, ISBN 9781787755932)
- Ciel in All Directions (transl. Andrea Zanin) (Second Story Press, 2021, ISBN 978-1772602036)
