= Harvey Award for Digital Book of the Year =

American comic book award

Digital Book of the Year
- Awarded for: Digital comics and collections
- Country: United States
- First award: 2018

The Harvey Award for Digital Book of the Year, established in 2018 as part of the Harvey Awards, is an annual American award for comics and graphic novels. Per the Harvey Awards website, the award honors the "best comic or collection originally presented in a digital format."

In 2018, the Harvey Awards were revamped into six categories, recognizing works as opposed to individual creators as in previous years.

== Winners and Nominees ==
Digital Book of the Year Award, 2018–present
Year	Title	Author	Publisher	Ref.
2018	Barrier	Brian K. Vaughan, Marcos Martin, and Muntsa Vicente	Panel Syndicate	
2018	Bandette	Paul Tobin and Colleen Coover	Monkeybrain	
2018	Check, Please!: #HOCKEY	Ngozi Ukazu		
2018	Not Drunk Enough	Tess Stone		
2018	The Tea Dragon Society	Kay O'Neilll		
2019	Check, Please!	Ngozi Ukazu		
2019	Space Boy	Stephen McCranie		
2019	The Contradictions	Sophie Yanow		
2019	The Nib	Matt Bors (ed.)		
2019	Women World	Aminder Dhaliwal		
2020	The Nib	Matt Bors (ed.)	thenib.com	
2020	Afterlift	Chip Zdarsky and Jason Loo	Comixology Originals	
2020	The Eyes	Javi De Castro		
2020	Fried Rice	Erica Eng		
2020	Harley Quinn: Black White & Red	Chris Conroy, Maggie Howell, Andy Khouri, and Amedeo Turturro (ed.)	DC Comics / DC Digital First	
2021	Lore Olympus	Rachel Smythe	Webtoon	
2021	Adora and The Distance	Marc Bernardin and Ariela Kristantina	Comixology Originals	
2021	Crisis Zone	Simon Hanselmann		
2021	Cyclopedia Exotica	Aminder Dhaliwal		
2021	Friday	Ed Brubaker and Marcos Martin		
2022	Lore Olympus	Rachel Smythe	Webtoon	
2022	Everything is Fine	Mike Birchall		
2022	I'm Fine I'm Fine Just Understand	ND Stevenson		
2022	Love Everlasting	Tom King and Elsa Charretier		
2022	Snow Angels	Jeff Lemire and Jock		
2023	Lore Olympus	Rachel Smythe	Webtoon	
2023	Barnstormers	Scott Snyder and Tula Lotay	Comixology Originals	
2023	Deeply Dave	Grover		
2023	Everything is Fine	Mike Birchall	Webtoon	
2023	Ripple Effects	Jordan Hart, Bruno Chiroleu, Justin Harder, and Shane Kadlecik	Fanbase Press	
2024	Friday	Ed Brubaker and Marcos Martin	Panel Syndicate	
2024	Lore Olympus	Rachel Smythe	Webtoon	
2024	Unordinary	uru-chan	Webtoon	
2024	Encore	Miles Burks	Webtoon	
2024	Heir's Game	suspu	Webtoon	
2024	Jamie	LD Lapinski	Yellow Jacket	
2024	A Witch's Guide to Burning	Aminder Dhaliwal	Drawn & Quarterly	
2024	Rose Wolves	Natalie Warner	Top Shelf Productions	
2024	Of Swamp and Sea	Mia Jay Boulton and Laurel Boulton	Webtoon	
2024	Boyfriends	Refrainbow	Webtoon	
2025	Sarah's Scribbles	Sarah Andersen	Simon & Schuster	
2025	Castle Swimmer	Wendy Lian Martin	Webtoon	
2025	Morgana and Oz	Miyuli	Webtoon	
2025	Resenter	Gigi Murakami	VIZ Manga	
2025	The Mafia Nanny	SH00 and Violet Matter	Webtoon	
2026	The Lycan	Mike Carey, Thomas Jane, David James Kelly, and Diego Yapur	Comixology Originals	
2026	In the Real Dark Night	Jimmy Gownley		
2026	The Keluarga Cable Ship Company	Mereida Fajardo	UK Digital	
2026	Nap Comix	Rachael Smith	Webtoon	
2026	Practical Defense Against Piracy	Tony Cliff		
2026	Terran Omega: The Ghosts of War	P.J. Holden		
2026	The World of Lublu	Charbak Dipta	The Charbax Store	
