= Dwayne McDuffie Award for Diversity in Comics =

American comic book award for diversity

- Awarded for: Diversity and inclusion in American comic books
- Location: Long Beach Comic Expo
- Country: United States
- Presented by: Long Beach Comic Expo
- First award: 2015
- Website: https://dwaynemcduffie.com/

The Dwayne McDuffie Award for Diversity in Comics is given to an American comic book that is committed to diversity and inclusion. It is named in honor of Dwayne McDuffie, a creator known for his work writing, editing, and producing comics and animation.

The nominees and winner are chosen by a selection committee of comics and animation professionals.

== History ==
Dwayne's widow, Charlotte McDuffie, née Fullerton came up with the idea for the award, and was aided by author Neo Edmund, to bring it into being. It is presented at Long Beach Comic Expo.

Comics and TV writer Matt Wayne was the initial director of the award.

Well known voice actor Phil LaMarr acts as Master of Ceremonies for the award presentation.

== Award winners and nominees ==
Year	Title	Authors	Artist	Ref.
2010s
2015 (1st)	M.F.K.	Nilah Magruder		
2015 (1st)	Ms. Marvel (Marvel Comics)	G. Willow Wilson and Adrian Alphona		
2015 (1st)	Shaft (Dynamite Entertainment)	David F. Walker and Bilquis Evely		
2015 (1st)	The Shadow Hero (First Second Books)	Gene Luen Yang and Sonny Liew		
2015 (1st)	Hex11	Lisa K. Weber and Kelly Sue Milano		
2016 (2nd)	Ms. Marvel (Marvel Comics)	G. Willow Wilson and Adrian Alphona		
2016 (2nd)	Andre The Giant: Closer to Heaven (IDW Publishing)	Brandon Easton and Denis Medri		
2016 (2nd)	Fresh Romance edited (Rosy Press)	Janelle Asselin		
2016 (2nd)	Moon Girl and Devil Dinosaur (Marvel Comics)	Brandon Montclare, Amy Reeder, and Natcha Bustos		
2016 (2nd)	Zana (Emet Comics)	Jean Barker and Joey Granger		
2017 (3rd)	Upgrade Soul	Ezra Claytan Daniels		
2017 (3rd)	Shaft: Imitation of Life (Dynamite Entertainment)	David F. Walker and Dietrich Smith		
2017 (3rd)	Amazing Forest (IDW Publishing)	Ulises Farinas, Erick Freitas, and more		
2017 (3rd)	StarHammer	J. N. Monk and Harry Bogosian		
2017 (3rd)	14 Nights	Kristina Stipetic		
2018	Leon: Protector of the Playground (Kids Love Comics)	Jamar Nicholas		
2018	Chimera (Comicker)	Tyler Ellis		
2018	Full Circle	Taneka Stotts and Christianne Goudreau		
2018	The Once & Future Queen (Dark Horse Comics)	Adam P. Knave, D.J. Kirkbride, and Nick Brokenshire		
2018	Quince (Fanbase Press)	Sebastian Kadlecik, Kit Steinkellner, and Emma Steinkellner		
2019	Archival Quality (Oni Press)	Ivy Noelle Weir and Christina Stewart		
2019	Papa Cherry (Pixel Pirate Studio)	Saxton Moore and Phillip Johnson		
2019	Exit, Stage Left!: The Snagglepuss Chronicles (DC Comics)	Mark Russell and Mike Feehan		
2019	Victor Lavalle’s Destroyer (Boom! Studios)	Victor LaValle and Dietrich Smith		
2019	The Carpet Merchant of Konstantiniyya	Reimena Yee		
2020	They Called Us Enemy (Top Shelf Productions)	George Takei, Justin Eisinger, Steven Scott, and Harmony Becker		
2020	Excellence (Image Comics)	Brandon Thomas and Khary Randolph		
2020	From Truth With Truth	Lawrence Lindell		
2020	Angola Janga: Kingdom of Runaway Slaves (Fantagraphics Books)	Marcelo D'Salete		
2020	Iyanu: Child of Wonder (Dark Horse Comics)	Roye Okupe and Godwin Akpan		
2021	Adora and the Distance (ComixOlogy)	Marc Bernardin	Ariela Kristantina	
2021	Himawari House	Harmony Becker		
2021	Swim Team	Johnnie Christmas		
2021	Nuclear Power	Desirée Proctor and Erica Harrell	Lynne Yoshii	
2021	Girl Haven	Lilah Sturges	Meaghan Carter	
2022	Ripple Effects (Fanbase Press)	Jordan Hart and Bruno Chiroleu		
2022	Blackward	Lawrence Lindell		
2022	Clock Striker	Frederick L. Jones, Issaka Galadima		
2022	The Man in the McIntosh Suit	Rina Ayuyang		
2022	Young Men in Love: A Queer Romance Anthology	Various		
2023	Aya Claws Come Out	Marguerite Abouet	Clément Oubrerie	
2023	Tales of the Orishas	Hugo Canuto		
2023	Queenie: Godmother of Harlem	Aurélie Levy	Elizabeth Colomba	
2023	Gleem	Freddy Carrasco		
2023	Mosely	Rob Guillory		
2023	The Wild Ones	Megan Lacera	Jorge Lacera	
2024	Call Me Iggy	Walter Greason	Tim Fielder	
2024	Akogun: Brutalizer of Gods	Murewa Ayodele	Dotun Akande	
2024	Alan Scott: Green Lantern	Tim Sheridan	Cian Tormey	
2024	The Graphic History of Hip Hop	Walter Greason	Tim Fielder	
2024	Recognized	Various		
2025	Crownsville	Rodney Barnes	Elia Bonetti	
2025	Age 16	Rosena Fung		
2025	Flip	Ngozi Ukazi		
2025	Ra! Ta! Ma! Cue!	Howie Shia		
2025	Okchundang Candy	Jung-Soon Goo (trans. Aerin Park)	Jung-Soon Goo	

== See also ==
- Dwayne McDuffie Award for Kids' Comics
