= Never Satisfied (disambiguation) =

Never Satisfied is the title of a webcomic created by Taylor Robin.

Never Satisfied may also refer to:

- "Never Satisfied", a song by Jennifer Lopez from the album A.K.A., 2014
- "Never Satisfied", a song by Judas Priest from the album Rocka Rolla, 1974
- "Never Satisfied", a song by Living Colour from the album Stain, 1993
- "Never Satisfied", a song by Tygers of Pan Tang from the album Crazy Nights, 1981
- "Never Satisfied", a song by Victory from the album Culture Killed the Native, 1989
