= Malori =

Malori is an Italian name. Notable people and fictional characters with the name include:

- Adriano Malori (born 1988), Italian cyclist
- Lorenzo Malori (1724–1830), Italian centenarian
- Malori "Mal" Crowett, a character in Mage & Demon Queen
