= Harvey Award for Best Young Adult Book =

American YA comic book award

Best Young Adult Book
- Country: United States
- First award: 2024

The Harvey Award for Best Young Adult Book is an annual American award for comics and graphic novels geared toward young adults. When the Harvey Awards were revamped in 2018, this award was originally titled Best Children's or Young Adult Book. In 2024, the award was split into Best Young Adult Book and Best Children's Book.

== Winners and Nominees ==
Best Young Adult Book nominees, 2024–present
Year	Title	Author	Publisher	Ref.
2024	Roaming	Jillian Tamaki and Mariko Tamaki	Drawn & Quarterly	
2024	Bunt! Striking Out on Financial Aid	Ngozi Ukazu and Mad Rupert	First Second	
2024	Sunhead	Alex Assan	HarperAlley	
2024	Brownstone	Samuel Teer and Mar Julia	Versify	
2024	The Fox Maidens	Robin Ha	HarperAlley	
2024	Homebody	Theo Parish	HarperAlley	
2024	Ghost Roast	Shawneé Gibbs, Shawnelle Gibbs, and Emily Cannon	Versify	
2024	The Deep Dark	Lee Knox Ostertag	Graphix	
2024	The Infinity Particle	Wendy Xu	Quill Tree	
2024	Clementine Book 2	Tillie Walden	Image	
2024	Prez: Setting a Dangerous President	Mark Russell and Ben Caldwell	DC Comics	
2025	Raised by Ghosts	Briana Loewinsohn	Fantagraphics	
2025	How It All Ends	Emma Hunsinger	Greenwillow Books	
2025	Strange Bedfellows	Ariel Slamet Ries	HarperAlley	
2025	Ash's Cabin	Jen Wang	First Second	
2025	Navigating with You	Jeremy Whitley, Cassio Ribeiro, and Nikki Foxrobot	Maverick/Mad Cave	
2026	This Place Kills Me	Mariko Tamaki and Nicole Goux	Abrams Fanfare	
2026	Angelica and the Bear Prince	Trung Le Nguyen	Random House Graphic	
2026	Flip	Ngozi Ukazu	First Second	
2026	Good Old-Fashioned Korean Spirit: A Graphic Novel	Kim Hyun Sook and Ryan Estrada	Penguin Workshop	
2026	Hello Sunshine	Keezy Young	Little, Brown Ink	
