= MFK =

MFK or mfk may refer to:

- Movement for the Future of Curaçao, a political party in the island of Curaçao
- Beigan Airport, an airport in Beigan, Taiwan, by IATA code
- North Mofu language, a language spoken in northern Cameroon, by ISO 639 code
- Maharashtracha Favourite Kon?, an award series for Marathi cinema presented by the Indian TV channel Zee Talkies
- Molde FK, a Norwegian football club
- Moss FK, a Norwegian football club
- M.F.K., an American webcomic and graphic novel
