= Bunt! Striking Out on Financial Aid =

2024 graphic novel by Ngozi Ukazu and Mad Rupert

- Date: February 13, 2024
- Publisher: First Second

Creative team
- Writer: Ngozi Ukazu
- Artist: Mad Rupert
- ISBN: 978-1250193513

Bunt! Striking Out on Financial Aid is a 2024 sports-themed graphic novel by Ngozi Ukazu and Mad Rupert. It follows a group of art students who must learn to play softball to earn an athletics scholarship.

== Plot ==
When Molly Bauer arrives for her first day at her dream art school Peachtree Institute of Collegiate Arts, she initially expects her exclusion from the freshman orientation tour list is a simple error, but at the school's financial aid office she learns that the Native Peachtree Scholarship that was supposed to cover her entire education has been discontinued. Confronted with $39,000 worth of tuition fees she and her mothers have no way to afford, Molly learns of an athletics scholarship that could resolve her financial struggles; however, to obtain it, she and nine other Peachtree students must not only learn how to play softball but also win an official varsity game.

== Development ==
Bunt! was originally pitched to Boom! Studios before being picked up by First Second. It was inspired by Ukazu's annoyances regarding predatory student loans and art schools as well as Rupert's past experience as a softball player.

== Reception ==
The Hub, a blog for the Young Adult Library Services Association, compared the book to Uzaku's previous hockey-themed webcomic Check, Please! as well as the TV series A League of Their Own, noting the presence of queer romance in the narrative. They also noted the representation of diverse skin tones, body types, and LGBTQ+ identities.

Publishers Weekly summarized the book's tone as "jovial and highly enjoyable," while also commenting on the themes of "financial precarity and educational inequity."

Kirkus Reviews concluded that Bunt! was a "heartfelt story of passion, teamwork, and overcoming the odds." Regarding Rupert's art, they stated the "dynamic, full-color illustrations make effective use of varied perspectives and panel shapes."

The book was nominated for the 2024 Harvey Award for Best Young Adult Book. It was also included in the 2025 Great Graphic Novels for Teens list by the Young Adult Library Services Association.
