= Outstanding Comics Awards =

American award for graphic novels

The Outstanding Comics Awards are a series of annual literary awards presented by the Graphic Novels & Comics Round Table, a division of the American Library Association. It is awarded to graphic novels and split into three audience groups, Children, Young Adults, and Adults, with each being further split into three categories: Fiction, Non-fiction, and Series. The first recipients of the awards were announced in January 2026.

== Outstanding Comics Award for Children ==
| Year | Category | Author | Artist | Title | Result | Ref |
|---|---|---|---|---|---|---|
| 2026 | Fiction | Paige Walshe | | Froggy: A Pond Full of Pals! | Won | |
| 2026 | Fiction | Gale Galligan | | Fresh Start | Honor | |
| 2026 | Fiction | Raúl the Third | | The Snips: A Bad Buzz Day | Honor | |
| 2026 | Non-fiction | Cindy Chang | | How to Draw a Secret | Won | |
| 2026 | Non-fiction | Daniel Miyares | | How to Say Goodbye in Cuban | Honor | |
| 2026 | Non-fiction | Anne Lambelet | | I'm a Dumbo Octopus!: A Graphic Guide to Cephalopods | Honor | |
| 2026 | Series | Sophie Escabasse | | Witches of Brooklyn. Vol. 1-5 | Won | |
| 2026 | Series | Tehlor Kay Mejia, Roseanne A. Brown | Junyi Wu, Justin & Alexis Hernandez, Kaylee Rowena | Are You Afraid of the Dark? Vol. 1-2 | Honor | |
| 2026 | Series | Lucy Knisley | | Peapod Farm Vol.1-3 | Honor | |

== Outstanding Comics Award for Young Adults ==
| Year | Category | Author | Artist | Title | Result | Ref |
|---|---|---|---|---|---|---|
| 2026 | Fiction | Juni Ba | | The Boy Wonder | Won | |
| 2026 | Fiction | Taylor Robin | | Hunger's Bite | Honor | |
| 2026 | Fiction | Keezy Young | | Hello Sunshine | Honor | |
| 2026 | Non-fiction | Briana Loewinsohn | | Raised by Ghosts | Won | |
| 2026 | Non-fiction | Kristina Gehrmann (translated by I.T. Hahnenberger and E. Castle | | Bloody Mary | Honor | |
| 2026 | Non-fiction | Debbie Tung | | My Perfectly Imperfect Body | Honor | |
| 2026 | Series | Kami Garcia | Gabriel Picolo and various artists | Teen Titans, Vol 1-5 | Won | |
| 2026 | Series | Tony Fleecs | Trish Forstner, Tone Rodriguez, and Sara Richard | Feral, Vol 1-2 | Honor | |
| 2026 | Series | Miyu Morishita | | Tsumiki Ogami's Not-So-Ordinary Life, Vol 1-2 | Honor | |

== Outstanding Comics Award for Adults ==
| Year | Category | Author | Artist | Title | Result | Ref |
|---|---|---|---|---|---|---|
| 2026 | Fiction | Anders Brekhus Nilsen | | Tongues | Won | |
| 2026 | Fiction | Jesse Lonergan | | Drome | Honor | |
| 2026 | Fiction | Anaïs Flogny | | Smoke Gets In Your Eyes | Honor | |
| 2026 | Non-fiction | Peter Kuper | | Insectopolis | Won | |
| 2026 | Non-fiction | Ben Passmore | | Black Arms to Hold You Up | Honor | |
| 2026 | Series | Marjorie Liu | Sana Takeda | The Night Eaters Vol. 1-3 | Won | |
| 2026 | Series | James Tynion IV | Martin Simmonds, Elsa Charretier, Tyler Boss, John J. Pearson, David Romero, Alison Sampson, Jorge Fornes, and Letizia Cadonici | The Department of Truth Vol. 1-6 | Honor | |
| 2026 | Series | Atsushi Kaneko, based on work by Osamu Tezuka | Atsushi Kaneko | Search & Destroy Vol. 1-3 | Honor | |
