= Morgana and Oz =

2021 webcomic by Miyuli

- Author: Miyuli
- Website: Morgana and Oz on Webtoon
- Current status/schedule: Complete
- Launch date: December 12, 2021
- End date: November 8, 2026
- Publisher(s): Webtoon, Webtoon Unscrolled
- Genre(s): Fantasy, Romance
- Original language: English

Morgana and Oz is a fantasy romance webcomic by Miyuli, which was published on Webtoon starting from 2021 to 2026. It follows a witch and a vampire who fall in love. It has been published in print by Webtoon Unscrolled since 2024.

== Plot ==
Morgana is a member of the Winterberry family of witches, who are in conflict with a clan of vampires. When she accidentally transforms one of the vampires, Oz, into a cat, they must work together to end the growing conflict.

== Publication ==
=== Digital ===
The comic launched as a Webtoon Original on December 12, 2021. Starting in 2025, the series was adapted into a video format. Music for the series is provided by Isabella LeVan.

=== Print ===
A print adaption of the series was published by WEBTOON Unscrolled. A sample of the first volume was included in a sampler produced by Webtoon Unscrolled for the 2026 Comics Giveaway Day.

| Volume | Date | Episodes | ISBN | Ref |
|---|---|---|---|---|
| 1 | September 3, 2024 | 1-19 | ISBN 1998854833 | |
| 2 | March 25, 2025 | 20-39 | ISBN 1998854892 | |
| 3 | September 30, 2025 | 40-58 | ISBN 1998341453 | |
| 4 | April 7, 2026 | 59-77 | ISBN 1998341798 | |

=== Other works ===
Both a learn-to-draw and a coloring book based on the series were released in 2024.

== Development ==
In interviews, Miyuli has cited the Studio Ghibli films Kiki’s Delivery Service and Howl’s Moving Castle (as well as the latter's original novel), Buffy the Vampire Slayer, and the music of Cecile Corbel and Yann Tierson as inspirations for the series.

== Reception ==
Both Kirkus Reviews and the School Library Journal reviewed the first print volume. Kirkus Reviews described it as an "adorable adventure with a thrilling ending", and praised Morgana as a "sweetly naïve protagonist". Comic Book Resources gave the first volume a ranking of 8 out of 10, and praised the narrative pacing, humor derived from Oz's feline form, and the lettering. Book Riot included it in a list of "The Best Comics We Read July-September 2024".

The series was a nominee for the 2025 Harvey Award for Digital Book of the Year. The Volume 1 print was also included on the 2025 Great Graphic Novels for Teens Reading List by the American Library Association.
