= Mooncakes (graphic novel) =

2019 graphic novel by Suzanne Walker and Wendy Xu

- Date: 2015 (webcomic); October 15, 2019 (graphic novel)
- Publisher: Lion Forge

Creative team
- Writer: Suzanne Walker
- Artist: Wendy Xu
- Letterer: Joamette Gil
- ISBN: 978-1549303043

Mooncakes is a 2019 fantasy graphic novel written by Suzanne Walker and illustrated by Wendy Xu. Originally published as a webcomic starting in 2015, it was adapted into a graphic novel published by Lion Forge.

== Plot ==
Nova Huang, a bisexual Chinese-American witch who uses a hearing aid, reunites with her childhood friend and long-time crush Tam Lang, a Chinese-American genderqueer werewolf, who is being hunted down by a mysterious demonic horse. The two must find a way to defeat the creature and whoever is controlling it, and deal with their mutual romantic feelings.

== Development ==
The story of Mooncakes was initially pitched as part of an anthology, with the authors deciding to turn it into a webcomic after it was not picked up.

The graphic novel make several changes to the original comic, such as giving Nova a new arc about not wanting to leave home and modifying Tam's relationship to the demon horse. Xu also redrew the webcomic's art for the print release.

Nova's hearing loss was inspired by Walker's own.

== Reception ==
Samantha Puc of The Beat gave the book a positive review, praising the artwork and worldbuilding, writing that "Mooncakes is a world so rich and full that learning more feels like a gift". She also positively noted the representation of queer people of color and visible disabilities through Nova's hearing aids, emphasizing how they are "a bright color that always contrasts against her dark hair." Holly Raidi, writing for Broken Frontier, described the graphic novel as "a sweet fantasy story, exploring relationships and growing up with the struggles that come with that", and further said the art gave Mooncakes "a rich, almost fairy-tale, feeling." Elvie Mae Parian of WomanWriteAboutComics noted the art's "autumnal color palette" and use of strong color saturation to represent magic, as well as the inclusion to Chinese-American cultural traditions and decision to re-release the graphic novel in July 2020 in commemoration of Disability Pride Month in the United States.

The book was given a starred review by School Library Journal.

=== Accolades ===
Year	Award/Honor	Result	Ref.
2019	Cybils Awards for Graphic Novel	Shortlisted	
2020	Hugo Award for Best Graphic Story or Comic	Shortlisted	
2020	Ignatz Award for Outstanding Comic	Shortlisted	
2020	American Library Association Rainbow Book List - Fiction	Top Ten	

== See also ==
- The Infinity Particle - graphic novel also by Xu
