= The Infinity Particle =

2023 graphic novel by Wendy Xu

- Date: August 29, 2023
- Publisher: Quill Tree Books

Creative team
- Creator: Wendy Xu
- ISBN: 978-0062955760

The Infinity Particle is a 2023 science fiction romance graphic novel by Wendy Xu. It follows an apprentice engineer in the 26th century who falls in love with her mentor's robotic assistant.

== Plot ==
Clementine Chang, a teenage aspiring engineer in the 26th century, travels to Mars to undertake an apprenticeship with the prestigious Dr. Marcella Lin after her creation of a moth-like robotic companion named SENA (for Sentient Emphatic Neurobonded Animatronic) puts her on the professor's radar. Clementine soon takes interest in Dr. Lin's android assistant Kye, who starts exhibiting strange glitches and seems to be increasingly growing beyond his programming. With Dr. Lin unwilling to accept Kye as a sentient individual and becoming abusive towards him, Clementine must find a way to help Kye escape the doctor's control, while also dealing with her own attraction towards the robot.

== Reception ==
Kirkus Reviews noted The Infinity Particle's overall hopeful tone despite the work's exploration of serious themes, concluding it was "a delightful tale that brings optimism back to science fiction." Publishers Weekly felt that the secondary characters were somewhat underdeveloped, but positively commented on the romance between Clementine and Kye. Of the artwork, they stated the pink and blue color scheme "subtly emphasizes the narrative’s contemplative and romantic aspects, and balances the simultaneously uplifting and melancholic tone."

Carla Riemer of School Library Journal commented on the book's themes of AI consciousness and how capitalistic interests have influenced AI development, and stated that the plot showed how "small gestures can have powerful impacts." The book was also positively reviewed by Emily Koch of BookPage, which compared it to The Girl from the Sea.

The Infinity Particle was a finalist for the 2024 Harvey Award for Best Young Adult Book. Book Riot also included it on its list of the best books for teens in 2023.

== See also ==
- Mooncakes - graphic novel illustrated by Xu
