= Hello Sunshine (graphic novel) =

2025 graphic novel by Keezy Young

- Date: September 23, 2025
- Page count: 384 pages
- Publisher: Little, Brown Ink

Creative team
- Writer: Keezy Young
- Artist: Keezy Young
- ISBN: 9780316509572

Hello Sunshine is a 2025 graphic novel by Keezy Young. It follows four teens searching for their missing friend and end up facing supernatural threats. It was nominated for both an Eisner Award and a Harvey Award.

== Plot ==
After a teen boy named Alex disappears after experiencing a public episode of psychosis, four teens close to him - his boyfriend Noah, his twin brother Jamie, his trans girl childhood friend Skylar, and Jamie's girlfriend Izzy - and the twins' family dog Cass work together to find him. Each chapter is told from the perspective of a different member of the group, starting with Noah. As the group hunts down Alex's trail, they end up facing off a demonic threat and uncovering the mysteries surrounding the death of Desdemona, the twins' mother who herself experienced mental illness.

== Reception ==
Hello Sunshine was reviewed by the School Library Journal, Kirkus Reviews, and Publishers Weekly, and was given a starred review by Booklist. Kirkus Reviews noted how the author "carefully avoids using magic as a metaphor for psychosis, nor does psychosis become a source of cheap scares," while School Library Journal concluded it was a "compassionate look at schizoaffective disorder, and how love can help those living with it."

Sean Dillon of The Beat described the book as a "comic about taking the seemingly flat archetypes we place onto people and finding the depths therein", and later included it on The Beat's Best Comics of 2025 list.

Andy Oliver of Broken Frontier stated that Hello Sunshine was a "intriguing mix of slice-of-life character study and claustrophobic horror story," and further writer that "Young’s use of lettering to express ideas of intrusive voices and psychosis is simply some of the finest and most effective I have ever seen in twenty years of reviewing at Broken Frontier."

=== Accolades ===
Year	Award/Honor	Result	Ref.
2026	Eisner Award for Best Publication for Teens	Shortlisted	
2026	Harvey Award for Best Young Adult Book	Shortlisted	
2026	Outstanding Comics Award for Young Adults	Honored	
2026	Ringo Award for Best Kids Comic or Graphic Novel – Ages 12 and Up	Shortlisted	
2025	Broken Frontier Awards - Best Artist	Won	
2025	New York Public Library Best Books for Teens	Included	

== See also ==
- Taproot: A Story About a Gardener and a Ghost - graphic novel also by Young
