= Ngozi Ukazu =

American novelist

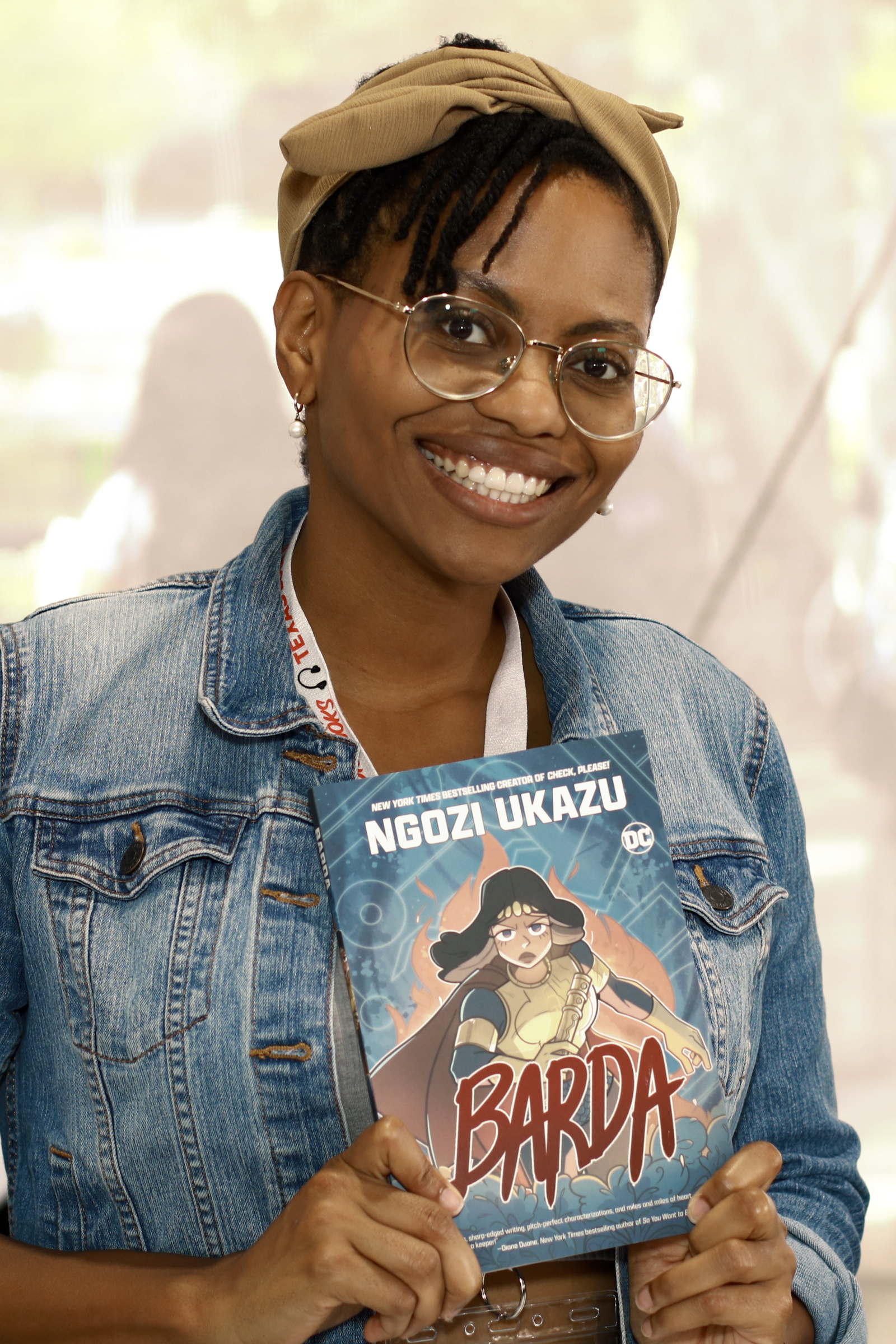
- Ukazu at the 2024 Texas Book Festival.
- Areas: Cartoonist, Writer
- Notable works: Check, Please!
- Awards: "Digital Book of the Year" Harvey Award (2019) "Outstanding Comic" Ignatz Award (2019)

Ngozi Ukazu is an American cartoonist and graphic novelist. In 2013, she created the webcomic Check, Please!, which later became a New York Times-bestselling graphic novel.

== Early life ==
Ngozi Ukazu grew up in Houston, Texas. She attended Bellaire High School, where she contributed to the school’s newspaper, The Three Penny Press, as the comics editor. She is the daughter of Nigerian parents. She studied computer science, obtaining a degree in Computing and The Arts from Yale University in 2013 and earned a masters degree in Sequential Art from the Savannah College of Art and Design in 2015.

== Career ==
Ukazu launched Check, Please! as a webcomic in 2013 after writing a screenplay about Eric "Bitty" Bittle, a gay college freshman and champion figure skater who joins a hockey team.

Ukazu created a Kickstarter campaign in 2015 to print the first volume of the comic; the campaign resulted in the highest-funded comics project in Kickstarter's history. In 2018, the first installment, Check, Please!: #Hockey, was published by First Second Books. The sequel, Check, Please!: Sticks & Scones, was a New York Times bestseller in May 2020.

In December 2025, Ukazu announced that a new volume of Check, Please! would be released in 2026. She also revealed that the series has been optioned for TV adaptation.

For DC Comics, she wrote and illustrated the young adult graphic novel Barda, based on the character Big Barda. The sequel, Orion, which follows the character of the same name, was published in 2026.

In September 2025, she published the graphic novel Flip.

== Publications ==
- Ukazu, Ngozi (September 18, 2018). Check, Please!: #Hockey. First Second. ISBN 978-1250177957.
- Ukazu, Ngozi (April 7, 2020). Check, Please!: Sticks & Scones. First Second. ISBN 978-1250179500.
- Ukazu, Ngozi (February 13, 2024). Bunt! Striking Out on Financial Aid. Illustrated by Mad Rupert. First Second. ISBN 978-1250193513.
- Ukazu, Ngozi (June 4, 2024). Barda. DC Comics. ISBN 978-1779511133.
- Ukazu, Ngozi (September 23, 2025). Flip. First Second. ISBN 978-1250179517.
- Ukazu, Ngozi (July 7, 2026). Orion. DC Comics. ISBN 978-1799503422.

== Awards and honors ==
Year	Work	Award	Result	Reference
2026	Flip	Harvey Award for Best Young Adult Book	Upcoming	
2026	Flip	Dwayne McDuffie Award for Diversity in Comics	Finalist	
2024	Bunt! Striking Out on Financial Aid	Harvey Award for Best Young Adult Book	Finalist	
2019	Check, Please!	Ignatz Award for Outstanding Comic	Won	
2019	Check, Please!	Harvey Award for Digital Book of the Year	Won	
2019	Check, Please!	William C. Morris Award	Finalist	
2018	Check, Please!	Harvey Award for Digital Book of the Year	Finalist	

=== Other Recognition ===
- 2018 The Boston Globe - Best YA of 2018
- 2018 Kirkus Reviews - Best Young Adult Books of 2018 That Explore Family and Self
- 2018 New York Public Library’s Best Books - Top Ten Books For Teens
- 2018 Best of Austin - Arts & Entertainment Critics Pick
- 2017 National Cartoonists Society - Winner, Best Online Comic: Long Form
- 2017 NPR - 100 Favorite Comics And Graphic Novels
