= Space Boy (webcomic) =

Science fiction webcomic series by Stephen McCranie

- Author: Stephen McCranie
- Illustrator: Stephen McCranie
- Website: www.webtoons.com/en/sf/space-boy/list?title_no=400
- Current status/schedule: Ongoing
- Launch date: March 2015
- Publisher(s): WEBTOON (web); Dark Horse Comics (print, 2018–2026)
- Genre: Science fiction

Space Boy is a science fiction webcomic series written and illustrated by American cartoonist Stephen McCranie. McCranie first started illustrating Space Boy in 2015 when Webtoon hosted its first talent search contest. After winning that contest, Space Boy debuted on Webtoon and the series has since then been ongoing. It was published in print by Dark Horse Comics from 2018 until 2026.

== Premise ==
The story takes place in the far future and is told from the perspective of a girl named Amy, who grew up on a mining colony in deep space. When her father is discharged from his work, the family is forced to return to Earth, necessitating a journey that requires thirty years of cryogenic stasis. Upon arrival, Amy has to adjust to life on Earth, while processing the loss of her old home, her friends, and 30 years of technological advancements. She has a form of synesthesia that allows her to perceive people's "flavors", tastes that describe someone's personality. At her new high school, she meets a nihilistic boy named Oliver, who appears to have no flavor, or no personality at all. As they become closer, she unwittingly becomes involved in a conspiracy involving a secret organization known as the FCP.

== Publication history ==
McCranie created and published the early pages of Space Boy for WEBTOON's first global talent search contest in 2015, drawing approximately 100 illustrated pages to enter. After winning the contest, the series began serialization on WEBTOON in March 2015 and has continued as a weekly WEBTOON Original.

Dark Horse Comics began collecting the series in trade paperback volumes in 2018, with Volume 1 released in June of that year. By early 2025 more than twenty volumes had been published.

In April 2026, McCranie announced that Dark Horse had decided to part ways with the series. In a subsequent update he explained that after Dark Horse was acquired by the Embracer Group, the publisher decided that lower-selling titles go out of print in order to focus on series that are more profitable. McCranie stated that he was able to regain the print rights and is currently exploring options for continuing the physical editions.

== Reception ==
School Library Journal called the first print volume "an arresting title with first-rate storytelling and beautiful use of color and design."

Joe Grunenwald of The Beat described the protagonist Amy as "instantly relatable and unique", and positively remarked on the worldbuilding, saying that despite "obvious technological changes on display in the book, overall Earth looks pretty recognizable."

It was also reviewed by Kirkus Reviews, which positively commented on the premise and artwork, but criticized the lack of exploration into future technology and Amy's "passive" personality.

The series was a finalist for the 2019 Harvey Award for Digital Book of the Year.
