= Of Swamp and Sea =

Webcomic by Mia Jay and Laurel Boulton

- Author(s): Mia Jay Boulton and Laurel Boulton
- Website: Of Swamp and Sea on Webtoon
- Current status/schedule: Completed
- Publisher(s): Webtoon (digital); 23rd Street Books (print)
- Genre(s): Fantasy, Romance

Of Swamp and Sea is a webcomic by Mia Jay Boulton and Laurel Boulton. It was published digitally on Webtoon from 2021 to 2025 and in print since 2025 by 23rd Street Books.

== Plot ==
After Mercy Gray Harding's father is killed by a monstrous wolf made of mist, she enlists monster hunter Jonah to take it down. The hunt goes awry and Mercy and the wolf fuse, and she and Jonah must find a way to undo the fusion before it becomes permanent.

== Reception ==
School Library Journal and Library Journal both reviewed the first print volume, with Library Journal also reviewing the third volume.

Jonathan H. Liu of GeekDad liked how the series explored Jonah's past and Mercy's internal conflict with the wolf, though noted the reliance on tropes such as Jonah leaving Mercy in an attempt to "protect" her.

Game Rant included it on a list of best non-Korean romance webtoons, saying "the characters' unique natures and backstories combined with a slow burn will make for one of the sweetest and best couples' chemistry you will find on Webtoon."

The series was nominated for the 2024 Harvey Award for Digital Book of the Year.
