= The Art of Charlie Chan Hock Chye =

Graphic novel

- Cover of The Art of Charlie Chan Hock Chye by Sonny Liew
- Date: March 2015
- Main characters: Charlie Chan Hock Chye; Lee Kuan Yew; Lim Chin Siong
- Page count: 320 pages
- Publisher: Epigram Books; Pantheon Books

Creative team
- Writer: Sonny Liew
- Artist: Sonny Liew
- Creator: Sonny Liew
- Editor: Joyce Sim

Original publication
- Published in: Epigram Books
- Date of publication: March 2015
- Language: English
- ISBN: 9789810731069 (paperback); 9789810754891 (e-book); 9789814655675 (Special Cover Edition paperback); 9789814655866 (Special Cover Edition hardcover); 9789814757812 (hardcover); 9781101870693 (Pantheon Books hardcover March 2016); 9788865439142 (L'arte di Charlie Chan Hock Chye, BAO Publishing, Italian version); 9782365779753 (Charlie Chan Hock Chye: Une vie dessinée, Urban Comics Editions, French version); 9789814785969 (Limited hardcover Eisner Edition)

The Art of Charlie Chan Hock Chye is a graphic novel by Sonny Liew published in 2015 by Epigram Books and 2016 by Pantheon Books. It tells the story of Charlie Chan Hock Chye, a fictional cartoonist, from his early days in colonial life to the present day, while showcasing extracts of his comics depicting allegories of political situations of the time. The comic features a mixture of black and white sketches depicting Singapore's early history contrasted with color comics depicting the present, with several comics within the novel telling their own story. The book was awarded the Singapore Literature Prize following its publication in 2016. The book soon gained widespread critical acclaim internationally and was given several awards, including three Eisner Awards in 2017.

== Plot summary ==
Charlie Chan Hock Chye, an old man, talks to an interviewer before transitioning to his childhood, where he is seen working in his family's shop in post-war Singapore. Charlie Chan's first published comic, "Ah Huat's Giant Robot", is shown, which features a robot that can only understand Chinese. The book cuts between the life of Charlie and excerpts from his comics, explaining that he was educated in an English school due to the generosity of one of his family's shops' customers.

Charlie begins a partnership with a fellow young writer, and this pattern of cuts between comics and his life continues throughout the rest of the novel. The duo's comics include "Bukit Chapalang", an allegory for Singapore's quest for independence from British Colonial rule featuring animals, and a sci-fi epic; "Invasion!", allegorizing Singapore as a city under the rule of aliens, with Lee Kuan Yew as a lawyer who speaks the language of the aliens; and "Roachman", featuring a superhero tale about a night soil man being bitten by a cockroach and becoming Roachman, a parody of Spider-Man. After 8 years and numerous comics, their relationship breaks down with him due to financial stress.

Nearing the end, a comic, "Sinkapor Inks", depicting the actions the Singapore government undertook to take control of the press is depicted via a comic depicting Singapore as Sinkapor Inks, a company with Lee Kuan Yew as a ruthless boss with the press as a company newsletter. Finally, an alternate reality comic, "Days of August", depicts Singapore if the Barisan Sosialis had won, ending in an alternate version of Singapore with a similar economic development as that of the present.

== Controversy ==
A grant of S$8,000 was initially given for the creation of the novel by the National Arts Council, but was revoked on 29 May 2015, ahead of the 30 May official book launch at Kinokuniya Singapore Bookstore due to "sensitive content" which sparked controversy.

A spokesperson for the NAC responded in a newspaper forum that the graphic novel "potentially undermines the authority or legitimacy of the Government and its public institutions and thus breaches our funding guidelines". Epigram Books founder Edmund Wee returned the S$6,400 and printed stickers to cover up the National Arts Council logo in the printed books.

The withdrawal of the government grant, however, created much publicity for the book and the 1,000 initial prints of the book sold out quickly upon its launch. The second print of books without the NAC logo was back in bookstores from 19 June 2015 onwards.

== International release ==
The book was published by American publisher Pantheon Books in March 2016 and released internationally. The book had appeared on international bestseller lists compiled by Amazon.com and The New York Times. Besides winning the Singapore Literature Prize in 2016, it also won the Book of the Year accolade at the Singapore Book Awards in 2016. It was also awarded the Pingprisen for Best International Comic in 2017. On 21 July 2017, Sonny Liew, the author of the book, won three Eisner Awards for Best Writer/Artist, Best Publication Design and Best U.S. Edition of International Material—Asia in the 29th annual Will Eisner Comic Industry Awards held at San Diego Comic-Con. He was also nominated for three other Eisner Awards for Best Letterer, Best Colorist, and Best Graphic Album—New.

== Awards ==
- Winner of the Singapore Literature Prize 2016
- The New York Times bestseller
- The Economist Book of the Year 2016
- NPR Graphic Novel Pick for 2016
- The Washington Post Best Graphic Novel of 2016
- New York Post Best Books of 2016
- Publishers Weekly Best Book of 2016
- South China Morning Post Top 10 Asian books of 2016
- The A.V. Club Best Comics of 2016
- Comic Book Resources Top 100 Comics of 2016
- Mental Floss Most Interesting Graphic Novel of 2016
- 2017 Pingprisen Bedste Internationale Tegneserte
- 2017 Eisner Award Winner for Best Writer/Artist
- 2017 Eisner Award Winner for Best Publication Design
- 2017 Eisner Award Winner for Best U.S. Edition of International Material—Asia
