= The Shadow Hero =

2014 comic miniseries

Publication information
- Publisher: First Second Books
- Format: limited series
- Publication date: February 18, 2014 - July 15, 2014
- No. of issues: 6
- Main character: Green Turtle

Creative team
- Written by: Gene Luen Yang
- Artist: Sonny Liew

Collected editions
- The Shadow Hero: ISBN 978-1596436978

The Shadow Hero is a six-issue digital comic miniseries, reimagining of the Green Turtle character in a retconned timeline, written by Gene Luen Yang and illustrated by Sonny Liew published by First Second Books.

== History ==
Gene Luen Yang reading The Shadow Hero

The miniseries was first published on February 18, 2014. Aiming to offer more representation for Asian Americans in superhero fiction, the creators reimagined the Green Turtle, originally created by the Chinese American artist Chu F. Hing in 1944, exploring aspects of Asian American lived experience of Asian Americans in ways the Green Turtle could not at the time of its inception.

In the original comic The Green Turtle the hero is often thought of as the first Chinese superhero, fighting against Japanese forces during World War II. However, because the Green Turtle famously never shows his face, it could never be confirmed. Gene Luen Yang's The Shadow Hero reimagines the main character, teenager Hank Chu, as a reluctant hero who struggles to find his identity in 1930s Chinatown of a fictional California city of San Incendio. In the New York Times, Dave Itzkoff titles his interview with the author "Gene Luen Yang thinks superheroes are for everyone."

In 2017, the Chinese restaurant chain Panda Express distributed the one-shot comic Shadow Hero Comics #1 as part of a campaign for Asian Pacific American Heritage Month. Aimed at a younger audience than the previous story, the new comic introduced a partner for the hero: Miss Stardust. Although she appears to be a blonde white woman, she is actually an alien who fled her home planet, placing her in a situation similar to that of the Green Turtle.

In 2018, Hunan Fine Arts Publishing House published the Chinese edition of The Shadow Hero (Chinese: 影子俠; pinyin: Yǐngzǐ Xiá; lit. 'Shadow Hero').

== Plot summary ==
Hank Chu is an American Chinese teenager who contentedly devotes his time to maintaining the family grocery store with his father. However, after his mother has an encounter with the local superhero, she urges Hank to become one himself. He is reluctant to her attempts, such as exposing him to chemical spills to give him superpowers, and shows more interest in the family business than crimefighting.

When horrific tragedy occurs in his family and community, Hank is motivated to pursue his role as a crimefighter. Along the way, he unknowingly becomes entwined with an ancient Chinese Tortoise spirit, allowing him impenetrability to bullets. Throughout the graphic novel, Hank battles the local Chinese gang's forceful reign over his community.

The author ends with a note breaking down how the original comic's author faced backlash from his publisher for wanting to make the hero Chinese, and how Yang and Liew went about creating a new twist on a classic tale.

== Collected editions ==
- The Shadow Hero (collects The Shadow Hero #1–6 and Blazing Comics #1), 158 pages, July 2014, ISBN 978-1596436978
