= Rose Wolves =

2023 graphic novel by Natalie Warner

- Date: November 14, 2023
- Publisher: Top Shelf Productions

Creative team
- Creator: Natalie Warner
- ISBN: 9781603095310

Rose Wolves is a 2023 wordless graphic novel by Natalie Warner. It follows a young girl who befriends a strange wolf with a rose for a tail.

== Plot ==
The protagonist, a nameless girl with one arm absent from the elbow down, discovers a rose from the forest and brings it home. Overnight, it transforms into a wolf with a rose for a tail and only one hind leg. The two become friends, but when the wolf falls ill, the girl must help it return to the forest.

The book is followed by a sequel titled Rose Wolves: Out of the Blue.

== Reception ==
Kirkus Reviews concluded its review by saying the book was "an exploration of love, kindness, and duty communicated eloquently without a word." Publishers Weekly described it as "heartwarming and sweet without being saccharine." It was also reviewed by School Library Journal.

Rose Wolves was a finalist for the 2024 Harvey Award for Digital Book of the Year.
