= Taproot: A Story About a Gardener and a Ghost =

2017 graphic novel by Keezy Young

- Cover Art
- Author: Keezy Young
- Illustrator: Keezy Young
- Language: English
- Genre: Paranormal Romance Webcomic
- Publisher: Lion Forge Comics
- Publication date: September 2017
- Publication place: United States
- ISBN: 1941302467

Taproot: A Story About A Gardener and a Ghost is a graphic novel written and illustrated by Keezy Young. A shorter version was released as a webcomic before it was lengthened by 40 pages and published in print. Published by Lion Forge Comics in 2017, Taproot is Young's first work. The novel is primarily a love story between a ghost named Blue and Hamal, a gardener who can see ghosts. Over the course of the novel, the two discover that Hamal's ability is caused by an imbalance between life and death, leading a figure resembling the grim reaper to begin stalking them.

Taproot was received positively, appearing on several LGBT booklists such as the Rainbow Book List Best Graphic Novel of 2017 and The Advocate's Best LGBTQ Graphic Novel. The novel has also won awards for its art, including the Florida Authors & Publishers Association award for best cover design, and Newsarama's Best of Best Shots 2017.

== Synopsis ==
Hamal works at a flower shop filled with ghosts, including his friend Blue. The owner Mr. Takashi and customers think he talks to himself. A flashback reveals how Blue and Hamal met, one year prior; Blue felt lonely and isolated from the living, and entertained himself by following people around. Until one day the man he followed home from the market turned around and asked Blue to leave him alone. Instead, Blue befriended Hamal and showed him the plight of the other town ghosts, eventually convincing him to help them find peace by interacting with the living world on their behalf.

Back in the present, Blue's internal monologue reveals he's in love with Hamal. He's suddenly transported to a dark grey forest, before appearing back in the flower shop. Hamal notes that when this happens, Blue actually disappears from his world, and the disappearances have been happening with increasing frequency. He fears this to mean the ghosts will eventually disappear forever. This anxiety leads him to try and articulate a crush on Blue, who laughs it off and tries to get Hamal to go on a date with Chloe, a regular flower shop patron. This leads to an argument and split.

Blue gets pulled to the haunted forest again. He meets a grim reaper, who accuses him of being the center of illegal necromancy taking place. When Blue denies any knowledge of this, the Reaper offers him a choice: bring him the necromancer, and don't get reaped, or don't, and maybe escape the reaper, only to be consumed by the hungry forest. Ultimately, the Reaper lets Blue go just as he's about to be eaten by skeleton vines, because Blue may be of use to him.

Blue and Hamal apologize for the fight, and Blue tells Hamal about the Reaper. Before they have time to plan, the Reaper shows up. Instead of reaping souls, he explains that Hamal is the necromancer, and it's his fault the forest is dying even if he didn't know because he's untrained. Hamal singing to the dying plants in the flower shop has been reviving them, but that life has to come from somewhere, resulting in an imbalance between the planes of life and death. The Reaper and leaves, warning that he can't fix this for them, but if Hamal doesn't do something, it will cost his life.

Using the grimoire left by Reaper, Hamal and Blue realize that they need to add something back to the plane of death. Blue's love for Hamal allows him to be the conduit. Rather than killing him, the spell brings Blue back to life. The Reaper shows up again, revealing that he changed the outcome of the spell in exchange for a favor, because he finds the couple cute and entertaining.

This favor turns out to be taking care of unruly spirits that are too trivial for the Reaper to bother with, allowing him some time off between more serious jobs. The epilogue shows Blue and Hamal living together happily some unspecified time later, with Blue working as a teaching assistant. A call from Reaper sends them to settle a ghost in Chloe's basement, by removing and burying a note left by the last resident of the house - a little girl who died in the hospital, never getting a reply from the friend she left notes for. Blue and Hamal go to get ice cream, and kiss on the seashore before walking home.

=== Main characters ===
- Hamal - Gardener who works at Mr. Takashi's flower shop. Accidental necromancer. Hamal is his nickname but no other name is given.
- Blue - Newly dead ghost and Hamal's love interest. Got his nickname from dyeing his hair blue since the eighth grade.
- Reaper - A dark, cloaked figure with no visible features besides a toothy grinning mouth, who inhabits the haunted forest.

== Illustrations ==
The novel is illustrated by the author, Keezy Young. The style is cartoonish, though extremely detailed, and vividly colored. It resembles a cross between manga and Studio Ghibli movies, which Young noted as significant influences when developing their style.

The novel uses distinct color pallets to convey shifts in tone; The world of the living is filled with light pastels, landscapes of flowers and trees, and colorful clouds. The dying forest where the reaper appeals switches entirely to grey tones with some muted blues, making Blue the only speck of color in a large empty space. The style's effect on the tone is significant. Where the plot itself deals prominently with death, grief, and loss, the colors reflect the cotton candy sweetness of the story, and the happy ending.

== Reception ==
Sarah Hunter of Booklist Magazine describes it as "enough gentle spookiness to give this some edge, but at its heart, it's a beautifully illustrated love story between two brown young men, and that's a refreshing change of pace" (2017).

=== Recognition ===
- American Library Association Rainbow Book List (2018)
- The Advocate Best Graphic Novels List (2017)
- Carnegie Public Library Staff Picks

== See also ==
- Hello Sunshine - graphic novel also by Young
