= Adora and the Distance =

2021 graphic novel by Marc Bernardin

- Date: June 15, 2021
- Publisher: ComiXology

Creative team
- Writer: Marc Bernardin
- Artist: Ariela Kristantina
- ISBN: 9781506724508

Adora and the Distance is a young adult graphic novel written by Marc Bernardin and illustrated by Ariela Kristantina. It was published exclusively digitally by ComiXology in 2021.

== Plot ==
Adora is a nine-year-old girl adopted into royalty who begins having dreams of a future calamity. She learns this is a strange and evil force known as the Distance and sets out with a group of companions to defeat it.

== Development ==
The book was first announced in 2019 at San Diego Comic-Con.

The character of Adora is based on Bernadin's daughter and her experience as an autistic person. Bernadin spent 15 years developing the novel.

Although intended as a one-off, Bernadin has expressed openness to continue the story.

== Reception ==
The book was reviewed by Publishers' Weekly. It praised Kristantina's art as "cinematic" and stated it "adeptly portray Adora’s ever-expanding worldview", though it argued the supporting cast was underdeveloped and described the book's conclusion as rushed. Ray Goldfield of GeekDad rated the book 9 out of 10, praising the narrative's avoidance of inspiration porn tropes, but criticized the book's short length and shared PW's assessment of the weak development of the supporting characters. Ian Keogh of The Slings & Arrows Graphic Novel Guide gave a more mixed review, finding the setpieces to be fantasy cliches, but described the ending as clever.

The book won the 2021 Dwayne McDuffie Award for Diversity in Comics. It was also nominated for the 2022 Eisner Award for Best Publication for Teens and the 2021 Harvey Award for Digital Book of the Year.
