= Nilah Magruder =

American animator

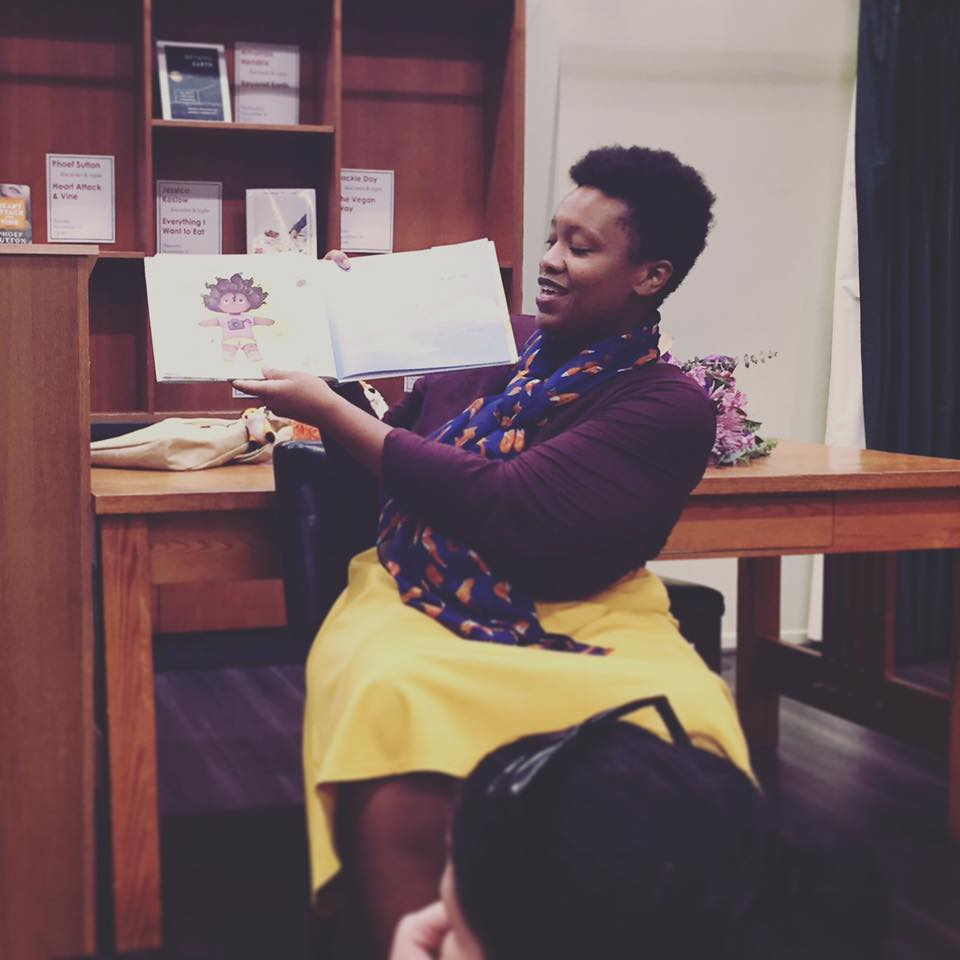
- Nilah Magruder reads "How to Find a Fox" at Vroman's Bookstore in Pasadena, California, 2016.
- Born: Nilah Magruder; Pasadena, Maryland
- Occupations: Writer, artist, comic creator
- Website: nilahmagruder.com

Nilah Magruder is an American comic artist who also works in storyboarding and animation.

== Life and career ==
Born in Pasadena, Maryland, Magruder gained a Bachelor of Arts in communication during 2005 from Hood College as well as a Bachelor of Fine Arts in computer animation from Ringling College of Art and Design.

She was the first winner of the Dwayne McDuffie Award for Diversity in Comics in 2015 for her web comic M.F.K. In 2016 she became the first Black woman to write for Marvel Comics. Her work first appeared in A Year of Marvels: September Infinite Comic #1 with a crossover comic featuring characters Tippy-Toe, Squirrel Girl's animal sidekick, and Rocket Raccoon from Guardians of the Galaxy. In 2016 Insight Comics licensed M.F.K. for print distribution with its first volume released in September 2017. She also worked on the series Marvel Rising and Vault of Spiders.

In addition to creating comics, Magruder has also forged a career as a storyboard artist, animator for film and television, and an illustrator for children's books. She has worked with Disney, DreamWorks, and Cannon Busters.

She illustrated the 2025 graphic novel Creaky Acres written by Calista Brill, which was nominated for the NAACP Image Award for Outstanding Graphic Novel in 2026.

== Bibliography ==
- How to Find a Fox
- M.F.K.: Book One
- All Out: The No-Longer-Secret Stories of Queer Teens Throughout the Ages
- Dactyl Hill Squad
- A Year of Marvels: September Infinite Comic #1
- Brill, Calista (May 6, 2025). Creaky Acres. Kokila. ISBN 978-0735230613.
