= Flip (graphic novel) =

2025 graphic novel by Ngozi Ukazu

- Date: September 23, 2025
- Page count: 320 pages
- Publisher: First Second

Creative team
- Writer: Ngozi Ukazu
- Artist: Ngozi Ukazu
- ISBN: 9781250179517

Flip is a 2025 graphic novel written and illustrated by Ngozi Ukazu. It follows a Black girl struggling with her self-esteem who starts swapping bodies with her popular white crush. It was published by First Second and received widely positive reception.

== Plot ==
Chi-Chi Ekeh, a Nigerian-American girl with low self-esteem at Mission Springs High School, develops a crush on Flip Henderson, a wealthy and popular white boy whose father was jailed for fraud, and creates an elaborate promposal video. Flip accidentally plays the video in class, and publicly rejects her. Heartbroken, Chi-Chi runs out of class and says "I just wished Flip Henderson liked me." She ends up slipping and hitting her head in the rain before heading back to her dorm and falling asleep.

The next morning, Chi-Chi discovers she has swapped bodies with Flip. She calls her phone number, and realizes Flip is now in her body. They rush to school to meet each other, and realize that their eye colors change depending on who is in whose body, but they have to attend each other's classes before they can do anything. Midway through the day, when Chi-Chi's roommates and friends Esther and Yesenia confront Chi-Chi in Flip's body about his rejection, they suddenly swap back. Chi-Chi and Flip reveal the situation to Esther and Yesenia, and end up switching bodies again while doing so. Later, when Chi-Chi (who is unable to drive) swaps back into her body while driving with Flip, Esther, and Yesenia, Yesenia notices a pattern. She concludes that each swap is twice the length of the previous swap, followed by an equal length of time in each person's true body. She is soon proven right when Chi-Chi and Flip switch at midnight on schedule.

To manage the situation until they find a solution, Chi-Chi and Flip set rules for when they are swapped, such as which pronouns to use, managing hygiene without violating the other's privacy, and dealing with each other's families. Despite their efforts, gossip starts to spread around due to Chi-Chi and Flip's apparent closeness. After Chi-Chi realizes she will miss out on a concert by her favorite K-Pop band BGBB due to the swaps, she conspires to end the curse before then.

One day, Chi-Chi in Flip's body encounters Flip's ex-girlfriend Madison Macy, who reveals she broke up with Flip after he didn't respond to her over the entire summer. She is throwing a large party at the end of the school year, and wants to get back together. Jealous of Madison, Chi-Chi as Flip tells Madison she would rather go with Chi-Chi and Madison leaves crying.

Upon learning of a twenty-year-old message board where two women reported similar symptoms, Chi-Chi and Flip go to the house of one of the swapped women, Sarah, only for her to tell them they never managed to stop switching bodies. The woman, who refuses to disclose her original identity, reveals that Sarah died while in her body, and that she has no idea what will happen when or if they swap again. Shortly afterwards, Madison calls Flip's phone, revealing what happened with Chi-Chi as Flip earlier. Chi-Chi and Flip fight and stop speaking to each other.

While attending therapy as Flip, who has been made to attend it ever since his father was jailed, Chi-Chi admits she loathes herself. Chi-Chi and Flip have a talk, and Flip confesses that he wished to be someone else the day before the first swap and he has been experiencing suicidal ideation. Chi-Chi realizes Flip has been dealing with depression while Flip realizes the extent of Chi-Chi's self-esteem issues when seeing messages on her phone. Accepting that they will likely never break the curse, Chi-Chi and Flip try to manage their lives around it. Chi-Chi attends the BGBB concert in alongside Esther and Yesenia in Flip's body, and starts crying when her favorite member Say gives a speech about loving yourself.

Later, Chi-Chi and Flip attend Madison's party while swapped. Watching Flip as herself, Chi-Chi starts reconsidering herself. When the yearbook committee announces senior honors, Chi-Chi is granted second honors to her shock. Seeing herself onstage, Chi-Chi has an epiphany about her self-worth. She suddenly swaps back into her body, and Flip falls back into a fountain. He is hospitalized but survives. Afterwards, while the two still occasionally flip, the episodes are very brief and they are able to live their own lives, often leaving messages to each other during longer switches. The book concludes with Chi-Chi taking a picture of herself and sending it to Flip.

== Development ==
In interviews for the book, Ukazu has described the work as "pretty autobiographical" and cited Toni Morrison's The Bluest Eye as an inspiration for the story.

== Reception ==
Flip's reception was widely positive. The book received starred reviews from Kirkus Reviews, Publishers Weekly, and School Library Journal. Kirkus Reviews emphasized the "fully realized and sympathetic characters, sincere and humorous development of friendships, and protagonist's relatable and bittersweet emotional journey," while Publishers Weekly described it as "an engrossing standalone graphic novel about self-acceptance rendered using clean line art, dynamic paneling, and eye-catching color palettes."

Book Riot included the book on a list of the best comics and graphic novels of 2025.

=== Accolades ===
Year	Award/Honor	Result	Ref.
2026	Harvey Award for Best Young Adult Book	Shortlisted	
2026	Dwayne McDuffie Award for Diversity in Comics	Shortlisted	
2026	American Library Association's Great Graphic Novels for Teens	Included	
2025	School Library Journal Best Graphic Novels list	Included	
2025	Kirkus Best Young Adult Books of the Year	Included	
2025	New York Public Library Best Books for Teens	Included	
