= Mage & Demon Queen =

Fantasy-comedy webtoon by Kuru (Color_LES)

- Malori "Mal" Crowett and Queen "Vel" Velverosa in an image appended to end of the webtoon's first issue in August 2018
- Author: Kuru (Color_LES)
- Website: Webtoon
- Current status/schedule: Ended
- Launch date: August 20, 2018
- End date: November 1, 2023
- Publisher: Webtoon
- Genre(s): Fantasy, comedy, yuri
- Rating: 9.78 Stars on Webtoon

Mage & Demon Queen is a yuri webtoon created by Filipino artist Kuru (Color_LES). The series follows an adventurer mage, Malori, as she attempts to seduce the Demon Queen Velverosa of her RPG fantasy world. It began publishing weekly on Webtoon in August 2018. The eleventh-most popular comic on the Webtoon platform; as of January 2020, it had 86 million views, and as of December 2020, Webtoon reported that it had 2.1 million subscribers. In November 2019, Webtoon released an official Spanish and French language version of the series. The webcomic updates weekly on Webtoon, and readers with the "Webtoon Fast Pass" can access pages earlier. By June 2021, 154 episodes had been published across three separate "seasons".

In September 2019, characters from Mage & Demon Queen made an appearance in the ninth episode of Webtoon promotional animated web series Let's Play, made to promote the Webtoon of the same name and the platform as a whole. This series marked Webtoon's first foray into animation. In May 2020, Geek Tyrant expressed interest in a potential anime adaptation.

== Plot and themes ==
Mage & Demon Queen is set in a fantasy world operating by the rules of role-playing games, where teams of human adventurers seek to challenge the Demon Tower. Whoever can ascend to the top floor and defeat the Demon Queen Velverosa will receive a handsome reward from the kingdom, with near-unlimited retry opportunities available thanks to resurrection magic. Malori Crowett, a particularly powerful young mage, has repeatedly reached the top of the tower; not to kill Velverosa, but to win her hand in marriage.

Plots in season two of the webtoon include the backstory of Velverosa and the King, Cerik being revealed as the original hero summoned to kill the Demon Queen, Princess Leora Siegwald seeking to seduce Malori and summon a second hero, and Malori being identified as a Demon Charmer and deciding to pledge allegiance to the Demon Army to end the war between the two. Plots in season three of the webtoon involve the return of Malori's mentor Cecillia and Velverosa's estranged fiancé Sepheron.

== Major characters ==
The following characters are central to plot lines in the comic and make regular appearances:

- Malori "Mal" Crowett is a 19-year-old student mage with levels on par with professionals, ranking at number one at the Adventurer's Academy. Despite many opportunities to kill the Demon Queen Velverosa, Malori instead wishes to battle her and have the Queen fall in love with her, regularly being killed by Velverosa during the assaults of the demon tower and being resurrected by the mana tree. As a child, she was sold into slavery by her parents, from which she Velverosa unknowingly accidentally freed her while destroying the village her slavers resided in, because of which she has had a crush on Queen Velverosa. Since the death of her subsequent adoptive father, Malori has been living on her own. She is currently level 89. In the second season, Malori is revealed to be a Demon Charmer, with the highest ever known levels of mana in existence. Her deepest desire is to marry Queen Vel, which is developed throughout the story.
- Cerik Aldebrandt is Malori's best friend and only superior in fighting ability, who has an obsession with lamia, creatures with snake-like lower bodies, to which point he is pleased to learn Velverosa's head-of-staff is Melathia, the Queen of the Lamias. In the second season, Cerik is revealed to be the original isekai Hero summoned to kill the Demon Queen, originally a cancer-ridden human from Earth whose mind was merged with that of the original Cerik's, although he has no intention of fulfilling his fate out of respect to Malori and has no memory of his former self, eventually becoming Melathia's personal assistant. After befriending fellow summoned Hero Axel and having his memories restored by him at the end of the second season, Cerik recalls his true identity as Lawrence Davis, having been reborn after meeting a goddess who pitied him for dying young in the afterlife. Missing his Earth mother, Cerik resigns his post in the third season and informs Melathia that he now intends to return to Earth, although seeking an alternative from having to kill the Demon Queen in order to do so (his only apparent means of returning).
- Queen "Vel" Velverosa is the current Demon Queen of the demon tower. She is widely known as a cruel and evil queen who shows no mercy to adventurers, as a result of her distrust in humans caused by previous encounters. Initially annoyed by Malori's infrequent assaults on her castle, she eventually grows fond of the adventurer and develops what she believes to be a crush herself in the second season, which she believes to be a result of Malori being a Demon Charmer and a high source of mana, becoming jealous of Leora because of her own crush on Malori.
- "Mel" Melathia is the Queen of the Lamias, and the second most powerful demon, who guards the tower as the seventh (and chief) general. A writer of fan fiction, she instructs the demons below Velverosa not to fight Malori after developing an interest in seeing how her various attempts to seduce the Demon Queen play out, maintaining a betting pool over the potential results. She later takes on Cerik as an assistant. She also ships Mal and Vel to the extent of writing "erotic fiction based on them."
- Princess Leora Siegwald is the daughter of the current king, who becomes infatuated with Malori and wishes to marry her in the second season, going out with a date with her in Folstina at one point. Since her pupal stage, she bears the mana crest tattoo, granting her exceptional mana levels, which she manages to use to summon another hero in place of Cerik, albeit one who has been trapped in a multiversal loop for many years.
- King Albert Siegwald is the twenty-third ruler of Folstina who ascended to the throne after killing the previous Demon King fourteen years ago, who sends adventurers after the Demon Queen in order to acquire her dragonness heart in order to prevent his coming death, caused by his dragon hunter lineage. He is known to sleep with prospective party members to recruit them.
- Axel Dronvar is the second summoned isekai hero, brought forth from the multiverse by Princess Leora Siegwald in an attempt to win Malori's affections by providing her with a rival. Physically near-identical to Cerik, Axel also began life on Earth, before being trapped in a loop of being summoned from realm to realm across time and space, previously slaying two different Demon Kings in an attempt to return home, a result of which being he has developed power on the same level as Malori. Driven by honor and bloodlust, Axel also seeks to form a bisexual harem.
- Lord Sepheron is the current Demon King of the demon tower. The estranged fiancé of Velverosa, Sepheron takes over her tower without violence in the third season after arriving to find her unconscious. Personally uninterested in the concept of taking Vel's place upon being requested to take replace her by representatives the Demon Rebellion Army (DRA), Sepheron is manipulated into doing so after the DRA representatives secretly has his favourite television series cancelled, before informing him he can get it renewed if he becomes Demon King.
- Fenn is the sixth general of the demon tower. Physically wolf-like and loyal to Melathia (after being rescued by her as a child), she becomes secretly attracted to Cerik after seeing him shirtless.
- Connoleth is the fifth general of the demon tower. Horned and winged, she is a fashionista whom Malori bribes with "the latest trends" to allow her to pass the tower without fighting.
- Fhaust is the fourth general of the demon tower and its chief researcher. Responsible for managing the tower's mana and constructing and maintaining its defences and "secret weapon", he encourages Malori's and Velverosa's relationship in an effort to keep Malori in the tower long enough to harness her high mana levels to charge the weapon and actually be able to use it.
- Diannos is the third general of the demon tower. A bipedal dinosaur general armed with a double-headed battle axe, he has a cartoonish appearance compared to other characters.
- Maurik is the second general of the demon tower. A wolf-like general like Fenn, he is quiet and withdrawn, although ambivalent about Malori's attempts to seduce Velverosa.
- Berkz is the first general of the demon tower. A large and muscular albino orc, after being beaten by Malori so often and embarrassingly over the course of her efforts to seduce Velverosa that he simply allows her to pass the tower each time in order so that he doesn't have to be beaten, he becomes fond of her for complimenting his skin rather than being prejudiced against him for it.
- Master Cecillia is Malori's mentor in magic. Deciding to train her as a child upon finding the concept of her marrying the Demon Queen hilarious, she is later trapped in a child form by a curse.
- Fillonne (Fillone) is Velverosa's childhood caretaker, who raised her due to Velverosa’s parents being busy, she eventually got fired for teaching child Velverosa that humans can be trusted. She has had past relations with a human, and is currently taking interest in Master Cecillia. She is Elven, a species that takes no place in war and is often taken advantage of. Her name is often spelled in two different ways.

The characters in Mage & Demon Queen are each defined by plays on various role-playing game stock character archetypes. According to columnist Avery Kaplan, "Queen Vel bears a striking resemblance [to Camilla from Fire Emblem, with] the world bear[ing] many striking mechanical similarities to the conventions of RPGs in general."

== Influences ==
In an interview with Okazu, Kuru lists some of the sources that she uses for the Mage & Demon Queen series. They include Hayate × Blade by Shizuru Hayashiya, Tamen de Gushi by Tan Jiu, Miss Kobayashi's Dragon Maid by Coolkyousinnjya, Tales of by Yoshiharu Gotanda, and Fate/Grand Order by Yosuke Shiokawa and Yoshiki Kanou. Other influences are Disgaea by Nippon Ichi, Ragnarok by Thomas F. Boyd and Rob Vawter, Kannazuki no Miko by Kaishaku, and Strawberry Panic! by Sakurako Kimino.

== Reception ==
In 2020, Webtoon announced that Mage & Demon Queen had been viewed over 86 million times, making it one of the top-30 most viewed webtoons on the platform. As of May 2020, Mage & Demon Queen is the eleventh-most popular webtoon on the platform, with over 2.1 million subscribers.

In an article for the Polish publication Polter, columnist Szymon Brycki recommended the webtoon, saying: "I must admit that I am pleased with the [characte]r creation. These characters don't just consist of a desire to seduce or run away from another person, [but] their psyche and behavior are justified by their story and life events that we learn gradually as the plot progresses. Their relationship with each other is also changing", additionally praising "[t]he line style [a]s very cartoonish, the colors [for being] in the right shades, [with] the shading also leav[ing] nothing to be desired", before concluding that "what you can enjoy most about this webcomic is not the promise of a lesbian romance or beautiful drawings, but the humor present in each episode — [that] the comedic potential of Mage and Demon Queen is the greatest advantage of this work."

The Beat praised Mage & Demon Queen for "combin[ing] multiple genre frameworks to create a queer comic that feels familiar but fresh", and for having "[s]elf-awareness about its foundations [to] give [the series] the chance to deliver on the validation of its central queer romance – and that's something worth coming back for at least a dozen times", with Avery Kaplan specifically in particular praising its "AU stories about the characters by Melathia the Lamia [for] allowing irresistible fan service as well as a fascinating perspective on the role of fan fiction."

CBR reviewer Samantha Puc described the series' "characters a[s] interesting, the plot utterly original", also praising "the art [as] so perfectly detailed it's impossible not to get sucked in right from the jump." A reviewer for The Geekiary praised the "attention to detail in the panels [as well as] the coloring", in addition to the "comedy, especially among the various demons, [of the] light-hearted romance with a heavy dose of adventure."

In an interview, Wendy Lian Martin of Castle Swimmer described the series as "really good" comparatively with other webtoon series including Novae and Lalin's Curse. while Makma referred to it "[as the] perfect blend of comedy and romance [against] a video game backdrop." Additionally, Catherine Zaw of Geek Gals said that the comic is a "fresh unique twist on RPG game-based stories," which will draw in readers.

== See also ==
- Wimmen's Comix
- List of feminist comic books
- Portrayal of women in comics
