= Hunger's Bite =

2025 graphic novel by Taylor Robin

- Date: February 25, 2025
- Publisher: Union Square & Co.

Creative team
- Creator: Taylor Robin
- ISBN: 978-1454950240

Hunger's Bite is a 2025 historical fantasy graphic novel by Taylor Robin. Set in the 1920s on a trans-Atlantic cruise ship, it follows the ward and the son of the captain who must help a vampire secret agent stop the ship's new owner's sinister plan.

== Plot ==
After the SS Lark sets sail for the first time after being bought out by the enigmatic American businessman Mr. Honeycutt, Neeta Pandey, ward of the ship's Captain Botwright, and Emery, Botwright's son, soon notice a shift in the ship's atmosphere; the high-class passengers are growing increasingly cruel while the crew, including Neeta's brother's Aamir, are harshly overworked. The friends, whose once-close relationship has been strained by differing plans for the future, learn these changes are supernatural in nature from a passenger named Warwick Farley, who happens to be both an American agent and a vampire. As Honeycutt strands the ship at sea, the passengers morph into cubist monsters and the crew becomes lost in a trance, and Neeta and Emery are forced to work with Warwick to stop Honeycutt's mysterious plot.

== Reception ==
Kathryn Hemmann of Comics Beat remarked on the art, describing the character designs as "marvelously expressive" and noting the use of "bold and unexpected color palettes." Hemmann further commented on how Hunger's Bite addressed 20th-century prejudice and discrimination, describing Robin as having "a critical eye and respect for its startling inequalities."

Kirkus Reviews stated the "dynamic" art "feature[d] an effective use of color to evoke mood," and commented that the book's "themes of class and power imbalances are masterfully handled and timely." Publishers Weekly, Booklist, Bookpage, and School Library Journal all gave the book starred reviews, with Publishers Weekly describing the book as a "jumps-off-the-page thrill ride." Booklist's review closed by stating the book "shines with its excellent color choices, robust onomatopoeia, and perfect balance of creepy and touching." In BookPage, Tami Orendain referred to Hunger's Bite as an "intense and charming graphic novel perfect for readers seeking an emotionally charged supernatural mystery."

=== Accolades ===
Year	Award/honor	Result	Reference
2026	Great Graphic Novels for Teens	Top Ten	
2026	Outstanding Comics Award for Young Adults - Fiction	Honored	
2026	Ringo Award for Best Kids Comic or Graphic Novel – Ages 12 and Up	Shortlisted	

== See also ==
- Never Satisfied - Webcomic also by Robin
