= Raised by Ghosts =

2025 graphic novel by Briana Loewinsohn

- Date: February 4, 2025
- Publisher: Fantagraphics

Creative team
- Creator: Briana Loewinsohn
- ISBN: 979-8875000508

Raised by Ghosts is a 2025 semi-autobiographical graphic novel by Briana Loewinsohn about her childhood in the 1990s.

== Summary ==
Set during 1990s in California, the book follows Loewinsohn's time in middle school, where she dealt with feelings of loneliness and the divorce of her parents. The book features notes and diary entries made by Loewinsohn alongside her illustrations.

== Reception ==
Publishers Weekly gave a starred review, describing Raised by Ghosts as depicting a "haunting sense of loneliness and being forgotten."

Zack Quaintance of The Beat compared the artwork to "Slightly-grungy Wes Anderson," and gave particular attention to a section which Briana imagines herself falling into her paper notes.

Lydia Turner of Broken Frontier characterized the book as "a love letter from Loewinsohn to her younger self, and also to lost souls, who are waiting to be seen."

The book was included in the New York Public Library's 2025 list of the Best Comic for Adults.

=== Accolades ===
Year	Award/Honor	Result	Ref.
2026	Outstanding Comics Awards for Young Adults - Fiction	Won	
2026	Eisner Award for Best Graphic Memoir	Shortlisted	
2026	Ringo Award for Best Kids Comic or Graphic Novel - Ages 12 and Up	Won	
2025	Harvey Award for Best Young Adult Book	Won	
