= Castle Swimmer =

Webcomic by Wendy Lian Martin

- Author: Wendy Lian Martin
- Website: Castle Swimmer on Webtoon
- Current status/schedule: Ongoing; updates Sundays
- Launch date: January 5, 2019
- Publisher(s): Webtoon, Ten Speed Press
- Genre(s): Fantasy, Romance
- Original language: English

Castle Swimmer is a fantasy LGBTQ romance webcomic by Wendy Lian Martin. It has been published digitally on Webtoon since 2019, and in print since 2024 by Ten Speed Graphic.

== Plot ==
In a world inhabited by various species of mermaids, the prince of the sharks, Siren, learns of a prophecy to save his cursed people. The prophecy requires him to kill an individual known as the Beacon, who turns out to be a boy named Kappa. With Siren unwilling to kill Kappa, the two attempt to find a way to avoid their fates.

== Development ==
Martin has cited the Little Mermaid world from the video game Kingdom Hearts as an inspiration for the work. She has also discussed a desire for explicit LGBTQ representation.

== Publication ==
=== Digital ===
The comic started publication on Webtoon in 2019, updating on Sundays. The series has been divided into four seasons.

=== Print ===
In 2024, it was announced that Ten Speed Graphic would be adapting the series for print, with the first volume being published in October of that year.

Volumes
| Volume | Date | Episodes | ISBN | Notes |
|---|---|---|---|---|
| 1 | October 22, 2024 | 1-19 | ISBN 978-0593835814 | |
| 2 | July 3, 2025 | 20-41 | ISBN 9780593835845 | |
| 3 | March 17, 2026 | 42-65 | ISBN 9780593835876 | |
| 4 | September 8, 2026 | 66-86 | ISBN 9780593835913 | |

== Reception ==
Reviewing the first print volume, CBR praised the humor and underwater theming, but criticized the overuse of blue in comic's color scheme, stating it made certain scenes blend together. School Library Journal also reviewed the first volume. Ollie Kaplan of The Mary Sue labeled it as one of the best middle-grade and YA graphic novels of 2024.

By November 2024, the series had approximately three million subscribers. By June 2025, it had 344 million views.

The series was nominated for the Harvey Award for Digital Book of the Year in 2025. The Volume 1 print was also included on the 2025 Great Graphic Novels for Teens Reading List by the American Library Association.
