= Never Satisfied =

Fantasy webcomic by Taylor Robin

- One of the comic's first covers
- Author: Taylor Robin
- Website: neversatisfiedcomic.com
- Current status/schedule: Abandoned
- Launch date: April 3, 2015
- Genre: Fantasy

Never Satisfied is a webcomic by Taylor Robin that began in 2015. Following the teenage magician apprentice Lucy, Never Satisfied presents a group of young people competing to become their city's magical representative. Robin's webcomic has been praised for featuring a varied LGBT cast, as each character has a different ethnicity, body type, and color palette.

== Synopsis ==
In Never Satisfied, young magicians compete to become their city's magical representative to their nation's king. The main characters are apprentices competing in a series of games to prove themselves the most competent magician, but one competitor, the confident and suave non-binary apprentice Lucy, has managed to stay in the running without using any magic at all. Lucy is able to do this with the help of their familiar cat Ivy, as well as through resourcefulness and luck, but may also hold a more complex secret.

Never Satisfied features a varied cast of characters, many of which are LGBT, such as Tetsu, who is non-binary, and Ana, who is lesbian. Each character has a unique ethnicity, body type, and color scheme. Each of the teenagers in Never Satisfied has a mentor or teacher somewhere in the city, and are therefore generally referred to as apprentices.

== Development ==
Taylor Robin started uploading pages of Never Satisfied on a personal website in April 2015, and it updated twice a week. Robin also does commission work.

In August 2021, Seven Seas Entertainment announced that they would release the webcomic in print.

== Reception ==
Lauren Davis of io9 described Never Satisfied as "just flat-out fun", specifically acclaiming its cast of characters, and noted that the main character Lucy is not color-coordinated like the other magicians. ComicsAlliance readers voted Never Satisfied the best new webcomic of 2015; in announcing the result, ComicsAlliance writer Charlotte Finn described it as "A delightful webcomic by Taylor Robin, with sharp artwork, artful storytelling, and a colorful, diverse cast of characters". Sarah Hunter of The Booklist Reader praised the character designs for their conveyance of personality. Autostraddle writer Mey said, "This comic combines a bunch of things that I love, cute animals, cute queer characters, magic, beautiful art and a great setting... And the character designs are so great! There are so many ethnicities and body types represented!"

Never Satisfied was discussed in a 2019 article on LGBTQ+ representation in webcomics on Her Campus, which used it and two other webcomics as examples of the proliferation of queer representation in webcomics, especially compared to television and traditional comics, and the importance of this to college-aged women. Robin said to Her Campus that as he is queer himself, he finds that content more interesting, so doesn't usually think about providing queer representation, but that he gets told by readers how important it was to see non-binary characters "in a work that portrays them as important and accepted without question.” Robin also said that many people assume that, based on their name and presentation, that the main character Lucy is female. In response, Robin decided to have a "one-strike policy" in his forums on misgendering Lucy, which he said had a "pretty split" response.

== Author ==
According to his personal biography, Taylor Robin is a graduate of the Rhode Island School of Design with a BFA in Illustration.

== See also ==
- Hunger's Bite - graphic novel also by Robin
