= M.F.K. =

Webcomic by Nilah Magruder

- Date: 2017
- Publisher: Insight Comics

Creative team
- Writer: Nilah Magruder
- Artist: Nilah Magruder
- ISBN: 9781683830047

M.F.K. is a fantasy webcomic by Nilah Magruder, adapted into a graphic novel in 2017 published by Insight Comics. It won the inaugural Dwayne McDuffie Award for Diversity in Comics.

== Plot ==
Jamie and his grandfather live in Little Marigold, a town in the desert tormented the parasai, a group of bandits with mystical powers. One day, they rescue an injured deaf girl named Abbie from a sandstorm.

== Reception ==
The book was reviewed by School Library Journal, which concluded that "Fans of animation and manga will be intrigued by this work". ICv2 rated the series as 4 out of 5, noting the use of anime-style close-ups and the European comic influences in the opening scene.

The series won the inaugural Dwayne McDuffie Award for Diversity in Comics in 2015.
