= Green Turtle (comics) =

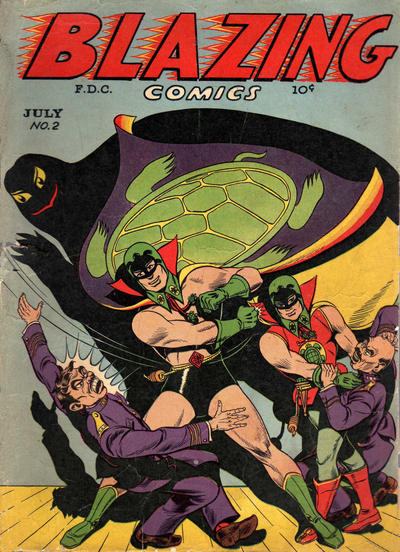

Publication information
- Publisher: Rural Home Publications
- First appearance: Blazing Comics #1 June (1944)
- Created by: Chu F. Hing

In-story information
- Full name: Hank Chu (The Shadow Hero); Yong Shi (The Liberty Brigade)
- Partnerships: Burma Boy; Wun-Too
- Abilities: Expert in hand-to-hand combat; Highly skilled pilot

The Green Turtle is a superhero originally published by Rural Home Publications. He first appeared in Blazing Comics No. 1 (June 1944), and was created by Chinese-American cartoonist Chu F. Hing. While the original run of the character lasted only five issues, the Green Turtle is notable for two factors. First, during WWII, the stories represented the Chinese in U.S. popular media as heroic partners fighting the Axis. One issue begins with the banner 美國及中華民國 (the United States united with the Chinese Republic), and features a U.S. general joining Chinese guerrillas in battle. During the war, U.S. depictions of the Pacific theatre were typically racialized; the "Yellow Peril" stereotypes applied to the Japanese were originally anti-Chinese and portrayed Asians as racial enemies of Western civilization. Second, the character is often identified as the first Asian-American comic book hero. These factors inspired a contemporary miniseries on the Green Turtle, The Shadow Hero, by Gene Luen Yang, whose American Born Chinese was the first work in a comics format to be nominated for the National Book Award.

The superheroic Green Turtle, battling Japanese forces in wartime China, appeared in the first five issues of Blazing Comics (June 1944 – March 1945) before it was discontinued after six issues and later fell into the public domain."

== Character history ==
The Green Turtle aided the Chinese in guerrilla warfare against the Japanese invaders in World War II. He wore a green cowl and a cloak with a turtle-shell design. Most origin stories around the comic say that Hing initially wanted to make him an overtly Chinese hero, but his publisher would not allow this, believing there would not be a sufficient market for an Asian superhero, so Hing never drew the character without his mask. He had a sidekick, Burma Boy, a young beggar whom the Green Turtle rescued from execution by the Japanese army. He also had a manservant, Wun-Too.

Chinese people refer to it as Ching Quai (Chinese: 青蜂俠; pinyin: Qing Gui), Green Turtle in Mandarin Chinese.

The Green Turtle's secret identity was never revealed, and readers never saw the character's face without a mask, Gene Luen Yang's The Shadow Hero gives him the identity of Chinese-American Hank Chu living in the Chinatown of a fictional California city of San Incendio.

== Powers and abilities ==
The Green Turtle as originally written has no special powers but is a skilled fighter and flies a high-tech Turtle Plane. He wears a large, flowing cape with a green turtle emblem, and is occasionally depicted with a huge, shadowy, black turtle silhouette rearing behind him. Though the significance of this is never established in the original series, it could be a visual reference to the Black Tortoise of Chinese mythology. He also carries a rope tied to his waist, which he uses to jump onto enemies. In addition, he has a jade dagger in a sheath at his side, though he is never shown wielding it.

== Other appearances ==
In 2014, Gene Luen Yang and Sonny Liew created a six-issue miniseries The Shadow Hero to revive the Green Turtle, with a retcon explaining the turtle silhouette as a spirit who keeps the Green Turtle from getting shot. A trade paperback collecting all six issues was published by First Second Books in 2014.

In 2017, the Chinese restaurant chain Panda Express distributed a new comic titled Shadow Hero Comics No. 1 as part of a campaign for Asian Pacific American Heritage Month. Aimed at a younger audience than the previous story, the new comic introduced a partner for the hero: Miss Stardust. Although she appears to be a blonde white woman, she is actually an alien who fled her home planet, placing her in a situation similar to that of the Green Turtle.

In 2018, Hunan Fine Arts Publishing House published the Chinese edition of The Shadow Hero (Chinese: 影子俠; pinyin: Yǐngzǐ Xiá; lit. 'Shadow Hero'), in which the character was referred to in traditional Chinese as Qing Gui xia (青龜俠). Unlike Chu F. Hing's original version, which did not use the xia (俠) suffix indicating that the character is a hero, this naming follows the same convention drawing on the millennia-old heroic tradition of yóuxiá (游俠) and wǔxiá (武俠).

In 2018, The Green Turtle was reimagined in The Liberty Brigade, an initiative that brought together public domain characters in new adventures. The project was crowdfunded by Kickstarter. In this version, the hero is Yong Shi, an immortal warrior from 13th century China, during the Yuan dynasty. According to the new mythology, Yong Shi was blessed by the gods Pangu and Nuwa after a desperate prayer, receiving the mission of protecting China. Active for over 700 years, Yong Shi also fought during World War II, when he began to fight alongside other heroes in the Liberty Brigade team.

== See also ==
- Secret Identities: The Asian American Superhero Anthology

== Bibliography ==
- Nevins, Jess (2013). Encyclopedia of Golden Age Superheroes. High Rock Press. ISBN 978-1-61318-023-5.
