= Tony Schiffman =

American jewelry businessman (1937–2015)

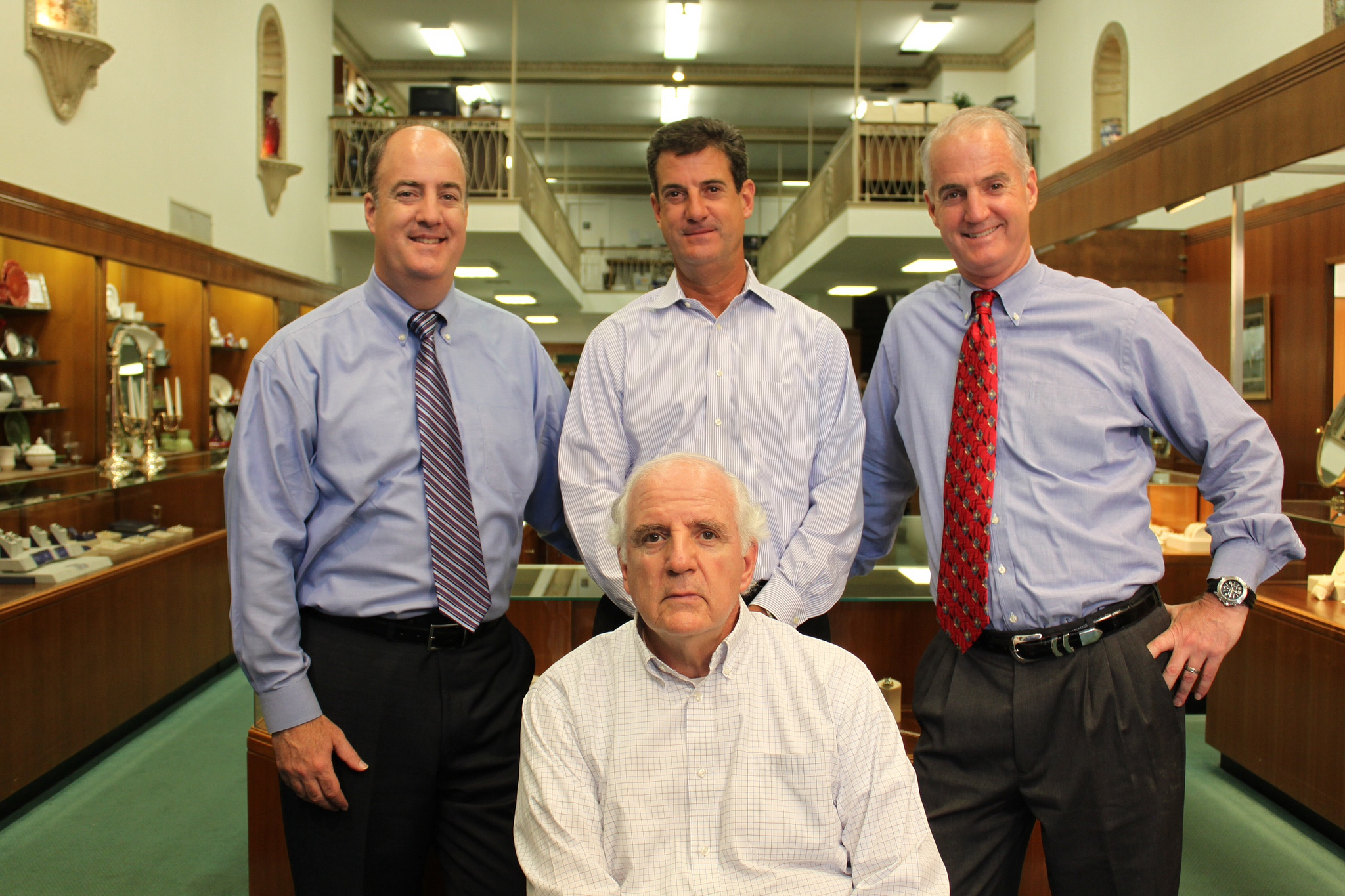
Tony Schiffman Jr. with his three sons.

Arnold Anthony "Tony" Schiffman Jr. (June 26, 1937 – February 9, 2015) was an American dealer of fine jewelry. He was the chief executive officer and controlling stockholder of Schiffman's, a chain of jewelry stores. Schiffman was the third-generation owner of Schiffman's, considered the oldest, locally owned jewelry store in Greensboro, North Carolina.

== Biography ==
Schiffman's parents, Arnold and Camille Schiffman, were the second-generation owners of the jewelry store. The Schiffmans were one of the earliest Jewish families to settle in Greensboro. A namesake of his father, Schiffman's sister bore their mother's name, Camille, with another sibling named Harry.

Schiffman and his wife, Madeline, have three sons—Arnold Anthony III, Lane, and Vance. They also have 8 grandchildren; Anthony, Brinkley, Margo, Rives, Allen, Kiley, Ren and Layton.

Schiffman attended UNC-Chapel Hill where he became an All-American swimmer under Coach Ralph Casey. He was a member of the Sigma Chi Fraternity and graduated in 1959. Schiffman was very active in the Greensboro business community including the Rotary Club of Greensboro, past president of the Guilford Merchants Association and the Greensboro Sports Council.

Schiffman died on February 9, 2015, in his home in Greensboro, North Carolina after his long fight with Parkinson's disease. He continued his lifelong passion to actively greet and work with his family, friends, and customers at Schiffman's in downtown Greensboro until his sudden departure.

== Joining the family business ==
Schiffman joined the family business in 1959. When his brother, Harry, followed suit in 1964, the company began expanding and bought the Carpenter-Matthew Jewelers, based in Asheville, North Carolina, the next year. In 1975, they acquired the McPhails Jewelers of Winston-Salem, North Carolina.

In 1985, Schiffman's bought Sylvan's Jewelers of Columbia, South Carolina. In 1992, the company bought Shreve & Co., San Francisco's oldest jewelry retailer. In 1994, the company bought Charlottesville's leading jeweler, Keller & George, which has been operating since 1875. Schwarzschild Jewelers, opened in 1897, was bought in 2007.

== National Jeweler Retailer Hall of Fame ==
The 75-year-old Schiffman was inducted into the 2012 National Jeweler Retailer Hall of Fame, under the Multi-Store Independent category. The award, which began in 1989, is based on peer recognition: new inductees are voted into the Hall of Fame by prior inductees.

== Philanthropy ==
The Schiffmans supported the Children's Home Society of North Carolina by donating proceeds from events organized by the company, such as the 5th Annual Schiffman's Charity Golf Classic held in September 2007. According to the CHS, the Schiffmans had been helping for the past century. In March 2012, the Schiffmans organized the Schiffman's Charity Classic Bridge Benefit, with all proceeds going to the programs of the CHSNC.
