= Sonny Liew =

Malaysia-born comic artist/illustrator

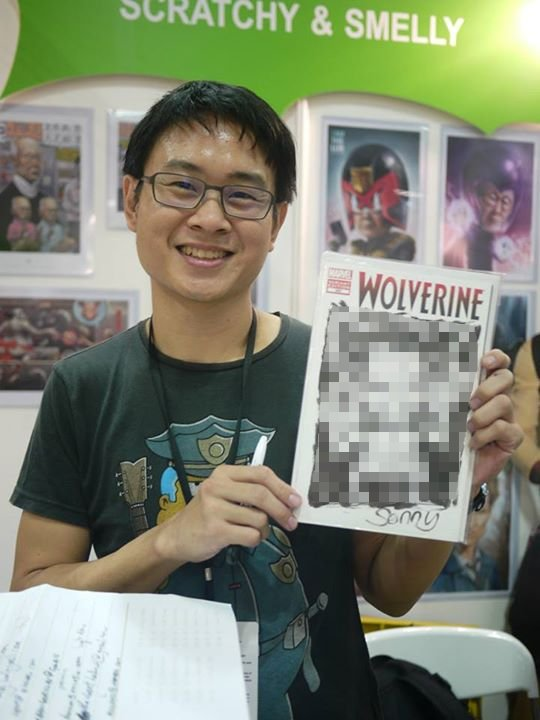
- Sonny Liew at STGCC 2014
- Born: 26 September 1974 (age 52); Seremban, Malaysia
- Education: Victoria School; Victoria Junior College; Clare College, Cambridge; Rhode Island School of Design
- Known for: Comic artist
- Notable work: The Art of Charlie Chan Hock Chye (2015)
- Website: www.sonnyliew.com

Sonny Liew Gene Sien (Note: Chinese: 刘敬贤; pinyin: Liú Jìngxián) (born 26 September 1974) is a Malaysian-born Singaporean comic artist and illustrator. He is best known for The Art of Charlie Chan Hock Chye (2015).

== Early life and education ==
Born in Seremban, Malaysia, Liew soon moved to Singapore and attended school at Victoria School and Victoria Junior College. He read philosophy at Clare College, Cambridge, in the UK and studied illustration at the Rhode Island School of Design in 2001.

== Career ==
His first foray into comic illustration was with Singaporean tabloid paper The New Paper in 1995, contributing a comic strip titled Frankie and Poo. A compilation of the strips was published by Times Publishing in 1996. Shortly after his graduation from Rhode Island, Shelly Bond signed him on for Vertigo Comics' My Faith in Frankie together with Mike Carey and Marc Hempel.

His work has appeared in the Flight Anthologies edited by Kazu Kibuishi, and he served as editor of the Eisner-nominated Southeast Asian comics anthology Liquid City from Image Comics. In 2011, he was nominated for an Eisner award in the pencilling/inking category for his work on SLG and Disney's Wonderland, written by Tommy Kovac. Other titles include Marvel Comics' Sense and Sensibility adaptation, First Second Books' The Shadow Hero with Gene Luen Yang, an origin story for the obscure Golden-Age comic book hero The Green Turtle, who is thought to be the first Asian-American superhero and DC Comics' "Doctor Fate" with Paul Levitz.

He is also the creator of Malinky Robot, a Xeric Award recipient in 2004 and winner of the “Prix de la Meilleure BD” (Comic Album of the Year) at the Utopiales International SF Festival in Nantes in 2009. He was a recipient of Singapore's Young Artist Award in 2010.

== The Art of Charlie Chan Hock Chye ==
The Art of Charlie Chan Hock Chye was first published and released by Epigram Books in 2015. It charts the life and career of a fictional comic book artist, the eponymous Charlie Chan Hock Chye, and by weaving together fact and fiction, and different genres, tells the story of the formative years of Singapore's modern history and the history of comics.

Shortly before the book's release in Singapore, the National Arts Council withdrew its grant of $8,000 for the title, citing "sensitive content" and its potential to "undermine the authority and legitimacy" of the government. The comic became the best-selling local fiction title that year. The Art of Charlie Chan Hock Chye was published in the United States by Pantheon Books in 2016 and went on to make bestseller lists at Amazon and The New York Times, which was unprecedented for a Singaporean graphic novel. Besides winning the Singapore Literature Prize, it also won the Book of the Year accolade at the Singapore Book Awards in 2016. It was awarded the Pingprisen for Best International Comic in 2017. At the 2017 San Diego Comic-Con, Sonny Liew and The Art of Charlie Chan Hock Chye won three Eisner Awards—Best Writer/Artist, Best U.S. Edition of International Material - Asia, and Best Publication Design. It was also nominated for three other Eisner Awards—Best Letterer, Best Colorist, and Best Graphic Album - New.

== Bibliography ==
Doctor Fate Vol 4 #1-12, #15-16 (2015-2016, DC Comics)

- Artist. With Paul Levitz (Writer).

The Art of Charlie Chan Hock Chye (2015, Epigram Books; 2016 Pantheon Books)

- Creator, writer, artist.

Warm Nights Deathless Days: The Life of Georgette Chen (2014, National Gallery Singapore)

- Creator, writer, artist

The Shadow Hero (2014, First Second Books)

- Artist. With Gene Luen Yang (Writer).

Malinky Robot: Collected Stories & Other Bits (2011, Image Comics)

- Artist, Writer

Vertigo Resurrected: My Faith in Frankie (2011, DC Vertigo)

- Artist, Co-Creator. With Mike Carey (Writer), Marc Hempel (Inker).

Sense and Sensibility (2010, Marvel Comics)

- Artist. With Nancy Butler (Writer).

Le Tour du monde en bande dessinée vol 2 (2009, Delcourt)

- Artist, Writer

Wonderland (2009, Disney Press)

- Artist, Co-Creator

Liquid City (Vol. 1, 2, 3) (2008-2014, Image Comics)

- Editor, Artist, Writer

Wonderland (2006-7, Slave Labor Graphics/Disney Press)

- Artist, Co-Creator. With Tommy Kovac (Writer).

Re-Gifters (2007, DC Minx)

- Artist, Co-Creator. With Mike Carey (Writer), Marc Hempel (Inker).

Flight (Vol. 2, 5, 8) (2005–11, Image Comics/Villard)

- Artist, Writer

My Faith in Frankie (2004, DC Vertigo)

- Artist, Co-Creator. With Mike Carey (Writer), Marc Hempel (Inker).
