= Briana Loewinsohn =

American artist and author

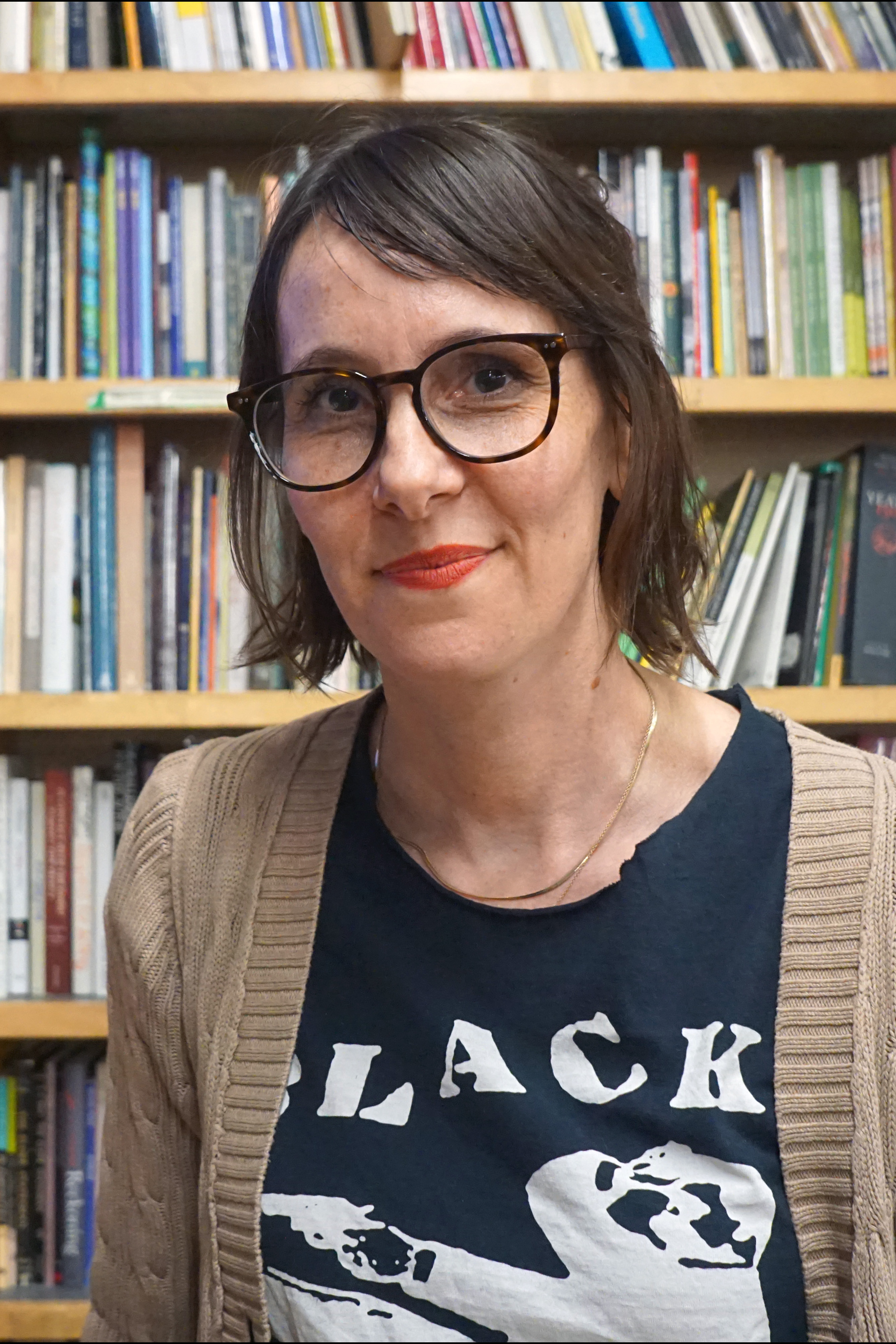
- Briana Loewinsohn at Pegasus Books in 2026
- Born: Briana Miller; October 31, 1980 (age 46) Berkeley, CA
- Areas: Cartoonist, Writer
- Notable works: Raised by Ghosts

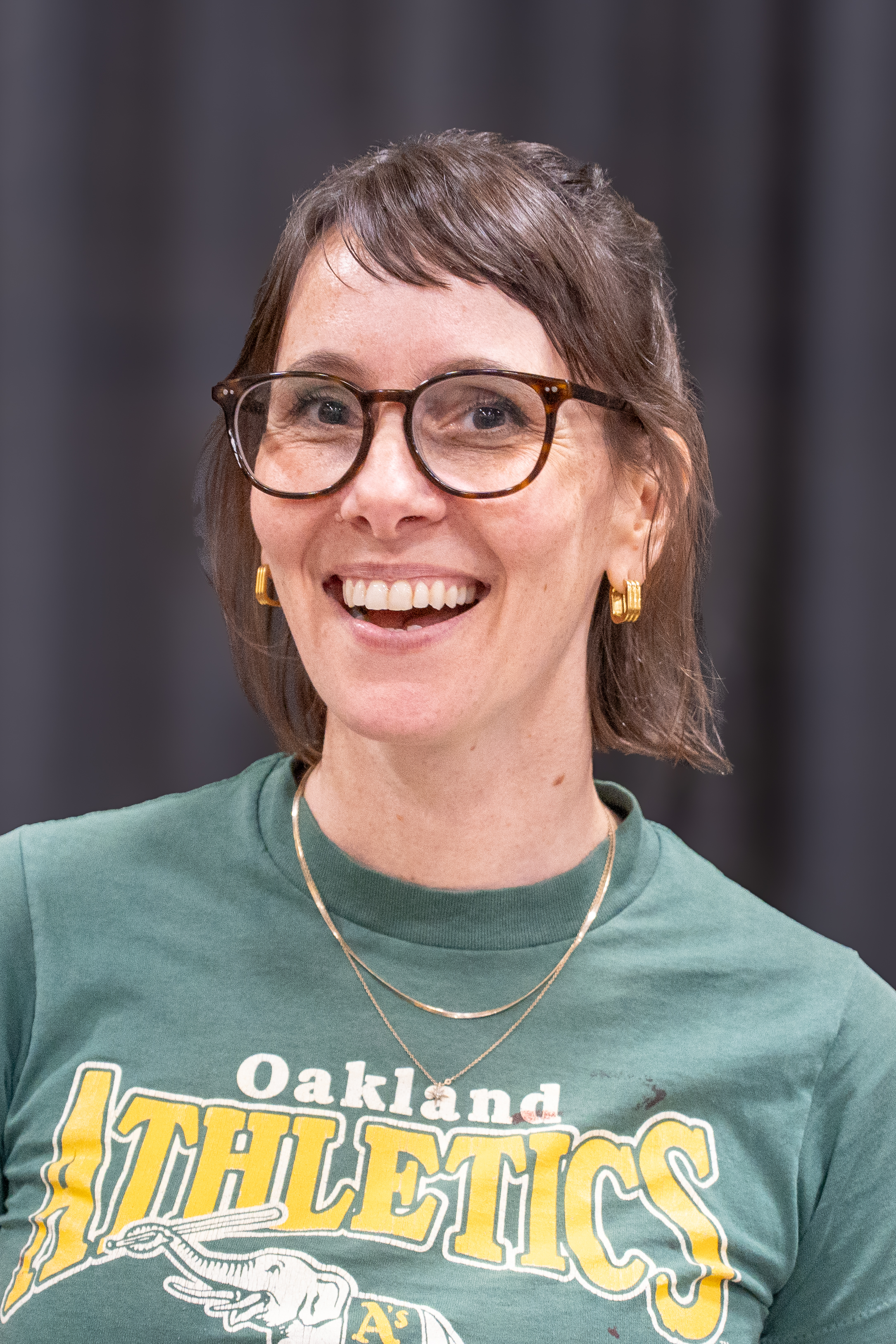
Briana Loewinsohn at Comic Con Oakland 2026

Briana Loewinsohn is an artist and educator based in Oakland, CA. She is an arts teacher at Bishop O'Dowd High School and is best known for her graphic memoirs Ephemera: A Memoir (2023) and Raised by Ghosts (2025).

Loewinsohn (née Miller) created minicomics in the 2000s, and she began to make longer comics narratives during the COVID-19 lockdown with fellow teacher and artist Thien Pham.

In 2023, Loewinsohn's Ephemera won the Editor's Choice Prize Nonfiction in the Foreword INDIES Book of the Year Awards. In 2025, Raised by Ghosts won the Harvey Award for Best Young Adult Book and was named one of the Best Comic for Adults by the New York Public Library. In 2026, Raised By Ghosts won the ALA award for Outstanding Comics for Young Adults.

Loewinsohn contributed to the Museum of Modern Art's Drawn to MoMA series in May 2025.

== Published works ==
- Ephemera: A Memoir (2023): A graphic memoir reflecting on Loewinsohn's childhood and relationship with her mother.
- Raised by Ghosts (2025): A coming-of-age graphic memoir set in the 1990s.
