= Marc Bernardin =

American journalist, public speaker, TV and comic book writer, and podcaster

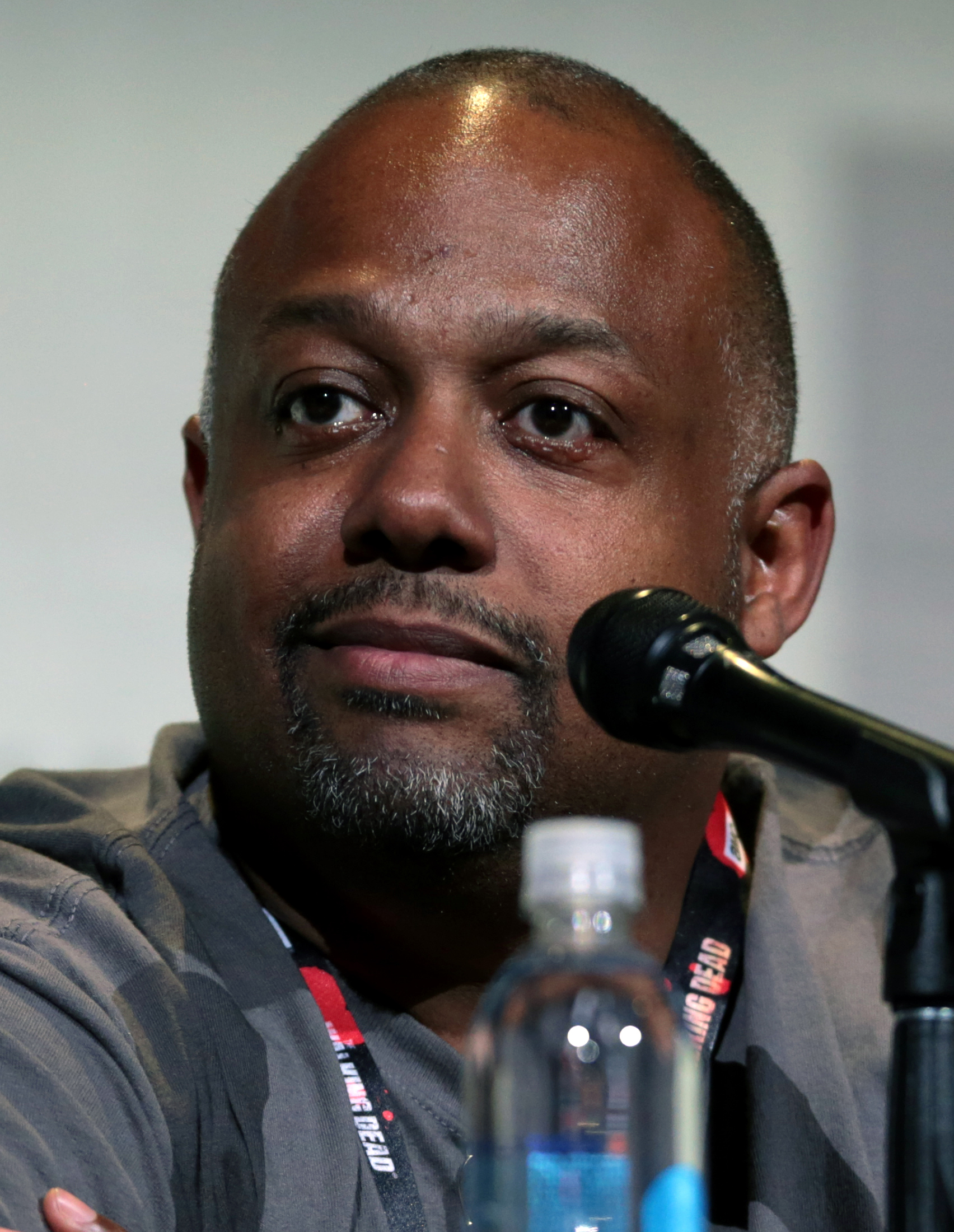
Bernardin in 2016

Marc Bernardin (born November 29, 1971) is an American journalist, public speaker, TV and comic book writer, and podcaster. He has served as film editor for the Los Angeles Times and senior editor for The Hollywood Reporter and Entertainment Weekly. He has written for GQ, Wired, Details, Vulture, Playboy, and Empire. He has been a staff writer for Castle Rock, Treadstone and Carnival Row, and a supervising producer on Star Trek: Picard.

== Career ==
Bernardin was an intern on Star Trek: Deep Space Nine.

He was a staff writer for the Syfy series Alphas, Hulu's series Castle Rock, based on the stories of Stephen King, USA Network’s series Treadstone, based on the Jason Bourne franchise, and Amazon Prime’s fantasy series Carnival Row. He has written comic books for Marvel, DC Comics, Image Comics and several independent comic publishers. He is the co-creator of the DC comic book series The Highwaymen, which is in development as a major motion picture. He co-hosts the Fatman Beyond podcast with filmmaker Kevin Smith, and a second podcast named The Battlestar Galacticast with Tricia Helfer. In 2018, Bernardin won an Inkpot Award, an honor bestowed annually since 1974 by Comic-Con International.

In 2019, Bernardin joined other WGA writers in firing their agents as part of the WGA's stand against the ATA and the practice of packaging.

On August 18, 2019, it was announced that Bernardin would be serving as writer for Masters of the Universe: Revelation on Netflix. Then, on February 21, 2020, Bernardin was announced to be part of the writing team for the upcoming animated series The Legend of Vox Machina, for Amazon Prime Video. On December 19, 2023, Bernardin announced he was part of the writing team for the upcoming animated series Eyes of Wakanda for Disney+.

In 2024, Bernardin partnered with Neil Gaiman to adapt the latter's novel Anansi Boys into a multi-volume comic series, with art by Shawn Martinbrough. Published by Dark Horse Comics, the first volume of Anansi Boys was originally planned to run for eight issues, but was ultimately cancelled after seven due to sexual misconduct allegations against Gaiman.

== Personal life ==
Bernardin has a daughter on the autism spectrum, who inspired his book Adora and the Distance.

== Bibliography ==
=== DC Comics ===
- The Authority #17-21 (2009-2010)
- JLA 80-Page Giant 2011 #1 (2011)
- DC Comics Presents: Lobo #1 (2011)
- Static Shock #7-8 (2012)

=== Marvel Comics ===
- Wolverine: One Night Only #1 (2009)
- Dark X-Men: The Beginning #2 (2009)
- Women of Marvel #1 (2010)
- X-Men Origins: Nightcrawler #1 (2010)
- Spider-Man: A Meal To Die For #1 (2011)
- King In Black: Planet Of The Symbiotes #2 (2021)
- Heroes Reborn: Peter Parker, The Amazing Shutterbug (2021)
- Star Wars: Darth Vader - Black, White & Red #3 (2023)
- Star Wars: Mace Windu (Vol. 2) #1-4 (2024)

=== Other publishers ===
- Monster Attack Network #1 (2007)
- The Highwaymen #1-5 (2007)
- Infinite Halloween Special #1 (2007)
- Pilot Season: Genius #1 (2008)
- Push #1-6 (2008-2009)
- Grunts (2010)
- Hero Complex (2010)
- Jake The Dreaming #1 (2011)
- Cartoon Network Action Pack #58 (2011)
- Nightwatchman (2012)
- Airwolf Airstrikes #6 (2015)
- Rampage Adventures #7 (2015)
- Genius #1-5 (2015)
- Love Is Love #1 (2016)
- Genius: Cartel #1-5 (2017)
- Adora and the Distance (2021)
- Census #1-5 (2022)
- Messenger: The Legend of Muhammad Ali (2023)
- The Devil's Cut #1 (2023)
- Anansi Boys (2024), with Neil Gaiman

== Screenwriting credits ==
=== Television ===
- Castle Rock (TV series)
  - Filter
- Alphas
  - The Unusual Suspects
- Treadstone
  - The Paradox Andropov
- Masters of the Universe (TV series)
  - The Most Dangerous Man in Eternia
- The Legend of Vox Machina
  - A Silver Tongue
- Eyes of Wakanda
  - Legends and Lies
  - Lost and Found
- Batman: Caped Crusader
  - Night Ride
