= Check, Please! (webcomic) =

2013 webcomic by Ngozi Ukazu

- Banner for Check, Please! Year One, featuring protagonist "Bitty"
- Author: Ngozi Ukazu
- Website: http://omgcheckplease.tumblr.com/ http://checkpleasecomic.com/
- Current status/schedule: Ongoing
- Launch date: 8 August 2013
- Genres: Sports, LGBT

Check, Please! is a 2013 webcomic written and illustrated by Ngozi Ukazu. It follows vlogger and figure skater-turned-ice hockey player Eric "Bitty" Bittle as he deals with hockey culture in college, as well as his identity as a gay man. Ukazu provides fans of Check, Please! a variety of extra content through her Tumblr and a dedicated Twitter account, establishing a piece of transmedia storytelling to expand on worldbuilding. A large fan base has accumulated around Check, Please!, and when Ukazu set up a Kickstarter campaign to fund the physical release of a first volume of the webcomic, she reached her goal with ease. In November 2019, Ukazu started up a Kickstarter to fund a Check Please! "chirpbook" containing Bitty's best tweets. The Kickstarter surpassed her goal within a single day. In 2021, Ukazu started a Kickstarter to fund a Year Four release with one of the rewards including a new comic entitled "Madison" taking place between Years Two and Three. On the final day of the campaign, the Check Please! Year Four Kickstarter became the most funded webcomics Kickstarter ever.

In May 2017, Ukazu created an official website for Check, Please. On April 7, 2020, book two of Check, Please! came out in bookstores, containing the comic's ending before it was posted on the website. Ukazu then started posting the remaining comics one a day onto the website ending on April 11 with the final comic which was itself entitled Check, Please!. However, the Year Four comic "Parse" and the Extra comic "Pranks" were left as existing only in book two and have not been posted to either the Tumblr page or the official comic page.

In December 2025, Ukazu announced that, while she originally planned to end the comic with Year Four, a fifth volume will be released in 2026 because Ukazu realized that she had one more story to tell. She also shared that Check, Please! has been optioned for a film/television adaptation. On November 10, 2026, Ngozi announced that Year Five would begin posting on November 19.

== Content ==
The plot of Check, Please! follows Eric "Bitty" Bittle, vlogger and (initially) freshman student at the fictional Samwell University, a Massachusetts private university. Formerly a figure skating champion, Eric landed a scholarship through a co-ed ice hockey game after sending in film of his skating skills. The character joins the school's hockey team, and is an instant hit with his teammates due to his cheery personality, culinary skills, and kind nature. Check, Please! details his interactions with the hockey team as Bittle interacts with four players and the female team manager: a cocky man named Shitty, the inseparable friends Ransom and Holster, stern and skilled team captain Jack, and sarcastic team manager Lardo. Meanwhile, Eric has to navigate his own sexuality due to his budding crush on Jack and eventual relationship with him. The webcomic follows the four years Eric spends at Samwell University in "real-time", and the plot focuses on events such as coming out, school stress, collegiate and professional athletics, and graduation.

The story of Check, Please! is told through Eric's narration, though the webcomic features short intermissions titled "Hockey Shit with Ransom and Holster", in which characters explain the rules and terminology of hockey in a humorous manner. Each page of Check, Please! may be in a different art style, depending on what Ukazu sees fit. Ukazu provides a variety of extra content through her Tumblr, answering readers' questions to the characters of the webcomic through short response comics. Check, Please! pages are aligned horizontally, as to imitate the look of online videos appropriate for Eric's vlogs. For Year Five, Derek "Nursey" Nurse takes over as narrator.

Ukazu makes use of transmedia storytelling by creating a Twitter account for her character Eric. Between updates, "Eric" writes tweets to fans of his vlog, an element Ukazu uses to interact with her readers and expand the narrative of the webcomic.

== Plot ==
In Year One, former figure skater Eric "Bitty" Bittle joins the Samwell Men's Hockey Team where his cheerful personality and baking wins over teammates "Shitty" Knight, Adam "Holster" Birkholtz, Justin "Ransom" Oluransi and team manager Larissa "Lardo" Duan. Bitty displays a fear of checking, often curling up into a ball on the ice when someone tries, earning him the ire of team captain Jack Zimmermann, the son of hockey legend Bad Bob Zimmermann. Jack helps Bitty through his fear with early morning checking practices while Bitty finds the courage to come out as homosexual. Jack and Bitty maintain a fraught relationship, complicated when Bitty scores in front of Bad Bob and is later put on Jack's line. During the playoffs, Bitty agrees to a risky play that leaves him with a mild concussion. Despite the team winning the game, they ultimately lose the playoffs. Bitty is given the room of graduating team goalie Johnson in the hockey team's frat house ("the Haus") and reconciles with Jack, who is voted team captain again, before they part ways for the summer.

In Year Two, Bitty's fear of checking returns worse than ever due to his concussion and he faces potentially being cut from the team. However, Jack helps Bitty through his checking phobia once more and he retains his spot on the team. Joining the team in Bitty's sophomore year are goalie Christopher "Chowder" Chow and defensemen William "Dex" Poindexter and Derek "Nursey" Nurse. Bitty often finds himself mediating for the latter two who are constantly at each other's throats despite being paired up on the ice due to their differing views caused by coming from two very different worlds. Now friends with Jack, who faces decisions regarding his own professional hockey future, while working together on a class project, Bitty realizes that he is falling in love with his team captain, feelings which only grow deeper as time goes on. The team makes it to the NCAA Frozen Four, but loses their last game. At the end of the year, Ransom and Holster are elected co-captains while Jack, who signs with the Providence Falconers expansion team, buys a new oven to replace Bitty's old one after it breaks down for good. Jack and Shitty graduate with Shitty heading off for Harvard law school, but Bitty can not bring himself to admit his feelings to Jack. After a talk with his father, Jack rushes back to the Haus and surprises Bitty with a kiss before having to leave again.

In Year Three, Bitty and Jack have officially begun dating over the summer, but keep their relationship a complete secret to protect Jack's hockey career. Joining the team is excitable Tony "Tango" Tangredi, reserved Connor "Whiskey" Whisk and later new manager Denice Ford, a theater major, while Jack becomes close friends with Alexei "Tater" Mashkov, an extremely friendly and extroverted Russian player on the Falconers. Jack and Bitty struggle with the pressures of keeping their relationship a complete secret, Bitty in particular, leading to Bitty having an emotional breakdown. The two reveal their relationship to their closest friends who had already figured it out, but kept quiet out of respect. Jack and Bitty later reveal their relationship to Jack's parents and to the Falconers who also prove to be supportive, Tater in particular. SMH gets knocked out of the playoffs early, but Jack's career with the Falconers soars and he is elected alternate captain partway through his rookie year while Bitty is elected captain of the Samwell team for his senior year on a rare unanimous vote. Living with Jack throughout the summer, Bitty struggles with telling his parents who don't know that he's gay, particularly Bitty's father Richard "Coach" Bittle with whom Bitty has always had a distant and difficult relationship. The Falconers win the Stanley Cup and Bitty and Jack share a kiss on center ice, coming out to the world.

In Year Four, Jack and Bitty have to deal with the aftermath of their public coming out which also revealed their relationship and Bitty's sexuality to his parents. After Coach Bittle comes to Samwell for Family Weekend, an explosive confrontation between father and son over Coach's apparent inability to recognize Bitty's relationship leads the two to reconcile and develop a closer relationship. Jack is invited to spend Christmas in Georgia with Bitty's family where, after some initial tension, Bitty's parents prove to be accepting and supportive of their relationship. At the same time, Bitty leads the Samwell Men's Hockey Team through a stellar season, joined by freshmen Johnathan "Hops" Hopper, River "Bully" Bullard and the Swedish Lukas "Louis" Landmann. Adding to Bitty's struggles, he is the first openly gay NCAA men's hockey captain, garnering Bitty attention from the media and fans that is both good and bad which Bitty takes as a chance to become a role model to those like himself. Tension between Dex and Nursey after they are forced to share a room causes Dex to move into the Haus basement while Bitty accidentally discovers Whiskey kissing a lacrosse player and is frustrated by Whiskey's constant rebuffing of Bitty's efforts to befriend him. The Samwell team makes it to the Frozen Four where Bitty skates through a massive check from a homophobic player on the other team and checks the other player so hard that they are both flung into the Samwell bench and Bitty loses a tooth; Samwell ends up winning the NCAA championship.

At the end of the comic, Bitty decides to give his room in the Haus to Whiskey, leading to the two finally talking about the kiss Bitty witnessed and Whiskey's struggles and Dex is elected the team's new captain. Bitty gives a class speech encouraging people to find a place where they can be themselves and accepts Jack's marriage proposal. After graduating, Bitty signs a deal to write his own cookbook and dedicates his vlog to covering his work on the cookbook with Jack as his first guest star.

== Characters ==
=== The Samwell Team ===
- Eric "Bitty" Bittle: A figure skater turned hockey player from Georgia and the comic's main protagonist. At the start of the comic, Bitty is a closeted homosexual who suffers from a phobia of checking due to bullying growing up, in particular an incident after he briefly played Peewee football. Bitty greatly enjoys baking and often provides his friends and teammates with his creations. As time goes on, Bitty starts a romantic relationship with his team captain Jack Zimmermann. At the end of his junior year, Bitty is elected team captain on a unanimous vote, something that only Jack ever got before and leads the Samwell Men's Hockey Team to victory in the NCAA championship as a senior. Following graduation, Bitty gets engaged to Jack and plans to write his own cookbook. As such, Bitty rededicates his vlog to covering his work on the cookbook with Jack as his first guest star.
- Jack Zimmermann: The French Canadian captain of the Samwell Men's Hockey Team who is the son of hockey legend Bad Bob Zimmermann. Years before, Jack was predicted to go first overall in the NHL draft, but suffered a public overdose that ended his prospects. Initially harsh to Bitty, the two eventually become friends and start a romantic relationship. After graduation, Jack signs with the Providence Falconers expansion team, where he becomes the Falconers' lead scorer and alternate captain alongside Marty and Thirdy as a rookie for the leadership that he brings to the team. Jack also becomes close friends with Russian teammate Alexei "Tater" Mashkov. Unlike his teammates, Jack does not have a nickname until joining the Falconers, where Tater often calls him Zimmboni, a mashup of Jack's last name and Zamboni. Jack and Bitty later get engaged after Bitty graduates and Jack becomes the first guest star on Bitty's vlog.
- Byron Sterling "Shitty" Knight: Generally known only by his hockey nickname of Shitty, he is one of Bitty and Jack's closest friends and comes from a rich family that he is not close with. After graduating from Samwell, Shitty joins Harvard Law school. Shitty has a close relationship with Lardo and the two are implied to have romantic feelings for each other. Shitty's real name, a mystery throughout the story, is revealed in the Year Four Tweets included with book two of the comic.
- Justin "Ransom" Oluransi: A defenseman and pre-med student from Canada and the best friend of Holster, the two basically adopt Bitty during his freshman year. Ransom has anxiety and sometimes curls into a ball when it gets too much for him. During Bitty's sophomore year, Ransom and Holster act as co-captains. After graduating, the two join a consulting firm after Ransom decides not to go to medical school which was his original plan. Ransom is a big fan of Jack's Falconers teammate and friend, Tater, to the point that he hides in the attic when Tater comes over out of nerves.
- Adam "Holster" Birkholtz: A defenseman and accounting student from New York and the best friend of Ransom, the two basically adopt Bitty during his freshman year. During Bitty's sophomore year, Ransom and Holster act as co-captains. After graduating, the two join a consulting firm.
- Ollie O'Meara and Pacer Wicks: Bitty's fellow freshmen on the team who mainly appear as background characters in several comics. When Ransom and Holster graduate, they give Ollie and Wicks the Haus attic, causing conflict between Dex and Nursey who thought one of them would get the attic. In one of the comic's Ask a Wellie extras, they are revealed to have gotten consulting jobs after graduation and married each other.
- Larissa "Lardo" Duan: An art student and the hockey team's manager. Lardo has a close relationship with Shitty and the two are implied to have romantic feelings for each other.
- William "Dex" Poindexter: A defenseman from Maine who comes from a poor family. Dex is a compsci major, the hockey Haus' unofficial unpaid handyman and a novice baker. Despite being paired up with each other on the ice, he and Nursey are often at each other's throats, much to the frustration of their friends. In Bitty's senior year, Dex and Nursey move in together due to a coin flip, leading to a blowout fight and Dex moving into the basement. Dex is elected captain after Bitty graduates with even Nursey voting for Dex as captain much to his surprise.
- Derek "Nursey" Nurse: A defenseman from New York City who comes from a rich family and has an interest in poetry and is an English major. Despite being paired up with each other on the ice, he and Dex are often at each other's throats, much to the frustration of their friends. In Bitty's senior year, Dex and Nursey move in together due to a coin flip, leading to a blowout fight and Dex moving into the basement. In Year Five, Nursey begins the Samwell Hockey Senior Vlog, taking Bitty's place as narrator.
- Christopher "Chowder" Chow: An Asian-American goalie from California and a die hard fan of the San Jose Sharks to the point that he decorates his room in Sharks' merchandise and constantly wears a Sharks hoodie. Chowder becomes close friends with Bitty, Dex and Nursey and is often caught in the middle of the latter two's arguments. When Chowder joins the team, he is wearing braces which he finally gets off between his sophomore and junior years. Chowder also has a girlfriend named Caitlin Farmer on the Samwell women's volleyball team. Chowder dreams of becoming a professional hockey player.
- Tony "Tango" Tangredi: A hockey player who joins the Samwell team when Bitty is a junior. Somewhat excitable, Tango appears to not be very bright, asking a lot of questions, some with obvious answers, during his Samwell tour. During Kent Parson's visit in Bitty's senior year, Tango discovers that he is apparently second cousins with Kent's teammate Scraps.
- Connor "Whiskey" Whisk: A hockey player who joins the team when Bitty is a junior alongside Tango. Whiskey is shown to be very reserved and spends more time with the hockey team's rivals, the lacrosse team, than he does his own teammates. Whiskey becomes the team's star player with stats comparable to Jack's and it is suggested that he has ambitions of playing hockey professionally. During his senior year, Bitty discovers Whiskey kissing a lacrosse player and Whiskey constantly rebuffs his attempts to talk to or befriend him, though Whiskey and Bitty are shown to make a good team on the ice. When Bitty graduates, he gives Whiskey his room in the Haus and the two reconcile. Whiskey admits to Bitty that he still has a girlfriend back home and is trying to figure out who he is.
- Denice "Foxtrot" Ford: A theater major who is hired as team manager as a replacement for the graduating Lardo.
- Johnathan "Hops" Hopper: An African-American hockey player who joins the team in Bitty's senior year. Hops' mother is a fan of Bitty's vlog and Hops and Bitty quickly become friends. In an Ask a Wellie posted on the Tumblr page, Hops is identified as the team's future captain amongst the Waffles.
- River "Bully" Bullard: A defenseman who joins the team in Bitty's senior year. Bully owns a motorcycle and was shown to be able to flawlessly perform Bitty's figure skating based hazing unlike Hops and Louis who both struggled.
- Lukas "Louis" Landmann: A hockey player who joins the team in Bitty's senior year. Louis is originally from Sweden and likes music.

=== Samwell Staff ===
- Coaches Hall and Murray: The Samwell Men's Hockey Team coaches. During Bitty's freshman and sophomore years, they both promote him to first line and threaten to potentially cut Bitty from the team due to his severe checking issues. In a flashback, they are shown to have chosen Bitty for the team due to his impressive speed although they were confused by all of the "spinoramas" that Bitty had included in the video he sent in to them. Bitty's relationship with his coaches is better as a junior and senior when his checking problem is better and he becomes the team captain.
- Professor Alice Atley: Bitty's academic advisor and the teacher of the class that Bitty shares with Jack in his sophomore year. Though the class was a senior history seminar, Bitty bribed Atley to let him in with a pie. During his senior year, Atley warns Bitty that if he does not turn in at least a rough draft of his thesis, he will not be able to participate in the NCAA playoffs, causing Atley and the team to stage an intervention to keep Bitty from baking until he turns in a rough draft of his thesis.

=== Friends and Family ===
- Suzanne Bittle: Bitty's mother with whom he is very close, although she is initially unaware of her son's sexuality. Suzanne, who enjoys baking like her son, is in a long-standing feud with her sister Judy over a jam recipe. After Jack joins the Providence Falconers, she becomes a major fan of his and Bitty struggles with revealing their romantic relationship to her. After learning of it, Suzanne and Bitty's relationship becomes somewhat awkward, but over Christmas she makes it clear that she supports her son no matter what, although she is enraged to learn that Bitty uses Judy's jam recipe instead of hers. In the Year Four Tweets included with book two of the comic, Bitty mentions that although Suzanne apparently knew that Jack was going to propose to him, she still cried.
- Richard "Coach" Bittle: Bitty's mostly unseen football coach father who is mainly referred to by his title of Coach, even by his son. Bitty and his father are shown to have a distant relationship with Bitty being concerned about his father's reaction in particular to his sexuality. During Bitty's senior year, Coach visits Samwell over Family Weekend, leading to a blowout fight over his apparent inability to accept Bitty and Jack's relationship. The two subsequently reconcile and become closer with Bitty often dropping his use of his father's title and Coach is shown to be very supportive of his son and Jack.
- Alicia Zimmermann: Jack's mother who is a famous actress. Alicia is shown to be supportive of her son and his relationship with Bitty.
- Robert "Bad Bob" Zimmermann: Jack's father who is a famous hockey player who won the Stanley Cup four times before retiring. Early on, Jack is shown to have a strained relationship with his father although they are closer in later comics. During Family Weekend Bitty's freshman year, Bitty scores a goal with his eyes closed, impressing Bad Bob with his skill and speed, but angering Jack who had failed to score. Bad Bob was the first to suggest that Jack and Bitty might make a good team if put on the same line. At Jack's graduation, it is Bad Bob who helps his son figure out Jack's feelings for Bitty and make a move on him and he is extremely supportive of their relationship.
- Kent Parson: The captain of the Las Vegas Aces expansion team and Jack's former best friend from when he was younger. When Jack dropped out of the NHL draft due to his overdose, Kent went first overall instead. After overhearing a fight between the two at a party his sophomore year, Bitty develops a grudge against Kent. Jack tells Bitty at one point that he and Kent owe each other a lot of apologies. After they start dating, Jack admits to Bitty that he and Kent had a romantic relationship as teenagers, but dismisses it as being more or less a fling. During a game between the Aces and the Falconers, Kent rushing the goal and nearly injuring Snowy draws him the ire of Tater who promises Bitty that he will throw Kent across the ice next time. In Bitty's senior year, Kent visits Bitty to clear the air between them and to give Jack and Bitty his best wishes.

=== The Providence Falconers ===
- Georgia "George" Martin: The assistant general manager of the Providence Falconers expansion team. During Bitty's sophomore year, she works on recruiting Jack and meets Bitty when he literally runs into her. George is the first person outside of their immediate friends and family that Jack tells about his relationship with Bitty, encouraging Jack in his desire to tell his new teammates.
- Alexei "Tater" Mashkov: An extroverted and friendly Russian hockey player and Jack's best friend on the Falconers. A big fan of Bitty's baking, when Jack comes out, his only concern is whether or not he can finally come over for dinner to have more of Bitty's cooking.
- Sebastian "Marty" St. Martin: One of the veterans on the Falconers and Jack's friend and somewhat mentor. Like Jack, he is French Canadian. When Jack decides to come out to his teammates, Marty is the first he tells by finally accepting Marty's long-standing request to come over for dinner as long as Bitty can join them. Marty proves to be very supportive of Jack and Bitty's relationship.
- Randall "Thirdy" Robinson: One of the veterans on the Falconers and alternate captain alongside Marty and later Jack. Alongside Marty, Thirdy is one of the first people on the team Jack comes out to and he has dinner with Marty, Jack and Bitty soon afterwards.
- Guy: One of the Falconers' veterans alongside Marty and Thirdy, his real name is unknown along with if Guy is just a nickname or his first name.
- Dustin "Snowy" Snow: The Falconers' goalie who Tater claims spends a lot of time in the trainer's room.
- John "Poots" Fitzgerald: A Falconers' rookie who got his nickname from allegedly pooting during an interview.

== Development ==
"Sports media is entirely about creating these narratives around athletes and their teams, which is why sports can be such fertile ground for transformative works in fandom."

— —Ngozi Ukazu

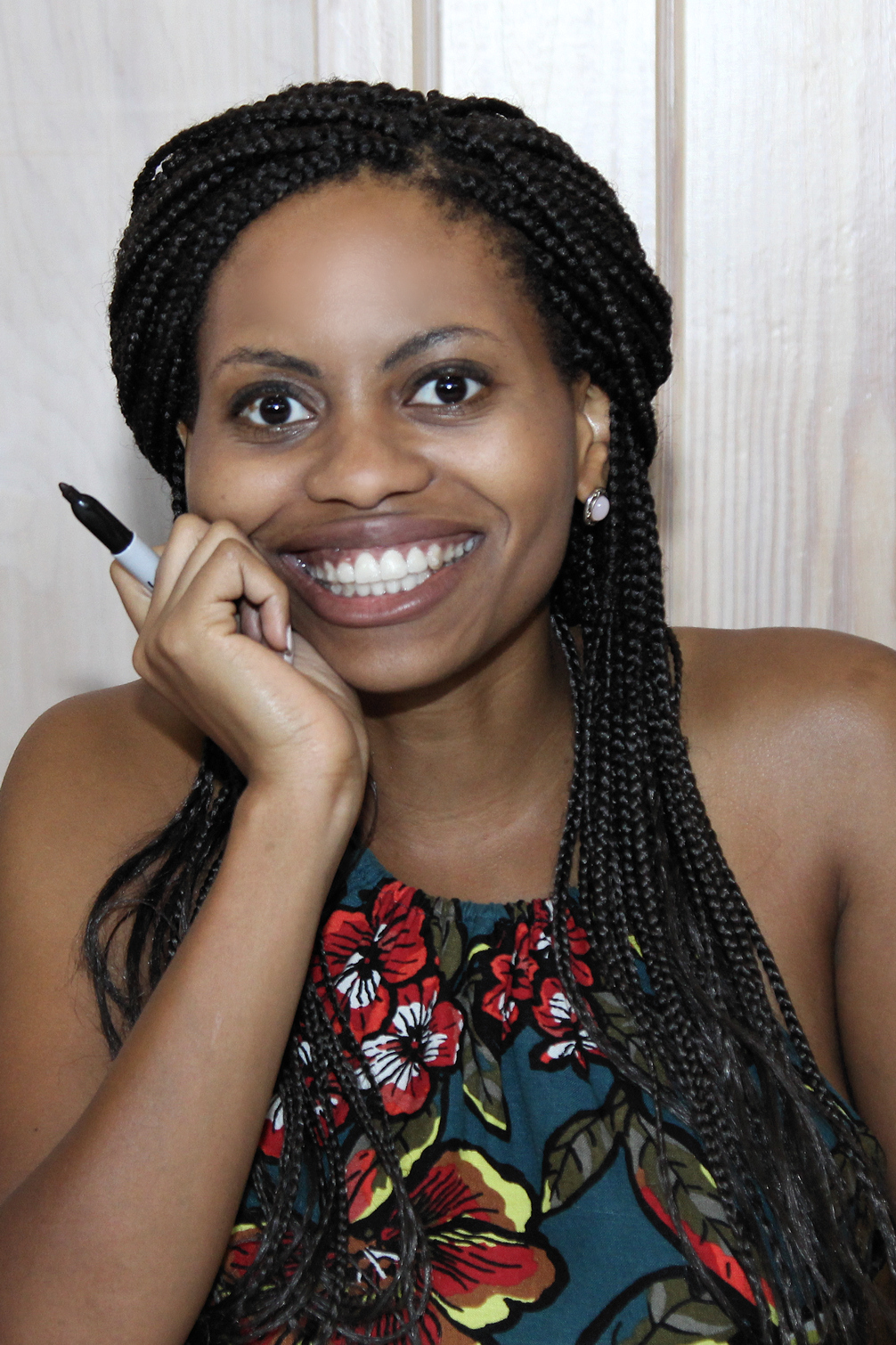
Ukazu at the 2018 Texas Teen Book Festival

Check, Please! is written and drawn by Ngozi Ukazu, a graduate of the Savannah College of Art and Design. Ukazu can not skate, but has a large amount of knowledge on hockey and hockey culture. She credits this to three months of research she did at Yale, as she was writing screenplay Hardy, starring a hockey player who falls in love with his best friend. Ukazu describes Check, Please! as somewhat of a reaction to Hardy, as her screenplay was rather depressing. Hardy featured themes of "addiction, externalized and internalized homophobia, the anxiety of graduating and feelings of failure." Ukazu described Check, Please!-protagonist Eric as "born to balance that out," and she suggested that Check, Please! conceived out of the question of whether "someone like Bitty [can] survive in a world like Hardy's."

Ukazu's ice hockey stories are inspired by narratives built around hockey players such as Jonathan Toews, Sidney Crosby, and Patrick Kane. Gavia Baker-Whitelaw of The Daily Dot described Ukazu's relationship with her webcomic as though Ukazu herself is part of the fandom. Ukazu draws short comic strips that were described by Baker-Whitelaw as "fanfiction of her own creation," and Ukazu's constant interactions with fans of the webcomic on Tumblr accentuates this.

In 2015, Ukazu launched a Kickstarter campaign in order to publish a first volume for the webcomic. Due to its large fan base, Check, Please! quickly reached its initial goal of $15,000 USD, eventually making US$74,000. A second Kickstarter campaign was launched September 2016, raising nearly $400,000 on a $32,500 goal, becoming the most-funded webcomic on Kickstarter. In June 2017, it was announced that First Second Books would publish two volumes of the webcomic. A third Kickstarter campaign was begun in November 2019 so Ukazu could launch what she described as a "chirpbook," collecting Bitty's best tweets to round out the Check Please! story. Within a single day, Ukazu surpassed her original goal of $26,000. In April 2021, Ukazu started a final Kickstarter campaign to bring Year Four to print and quickly surpassed her original goal of $63,000. One of the rewards included a new comic entitled "Madison" taking place between Years Two and Three. On the final day of the campaign, the Check Please! Year Four Kickstarter became the most funded webcomics Kickstarter ever.

== Reception ==
Chloe Goodwin of The Rocky Mountain Collegian described the story of Check, Please! as "addictive" and praised Ukazu as an "extraordinary artist". Goodwin mainly applauded Ukazu for her worldbuilding, describing the setting of Check, Please! as "a vast detailed universe." Writing for The A.V. Club, Caitlin Rosberg described Check, Please! as a "passion project", praising "the clear care and love that goes into every page of content." Rosberg particularly enjoyed Ukazu's characterization, stating that each character has his own motivation and character quirks, even if they're all supposed to be "bros".

In 2017, Check, Please! won a Reuben Award in the "Online Comic: Long Form" category. In 2019, it won the Harvey Award for Digital Book of the Year, and an Ignatz award for Outstanding comic. Check, Please! Book 2: Sticks & Scones was nominated for the Eisner Award for Best Publication for Teens in the 2021 award season.
