= Hudsonville High School =

School in Hudsonville, Michigan, United States

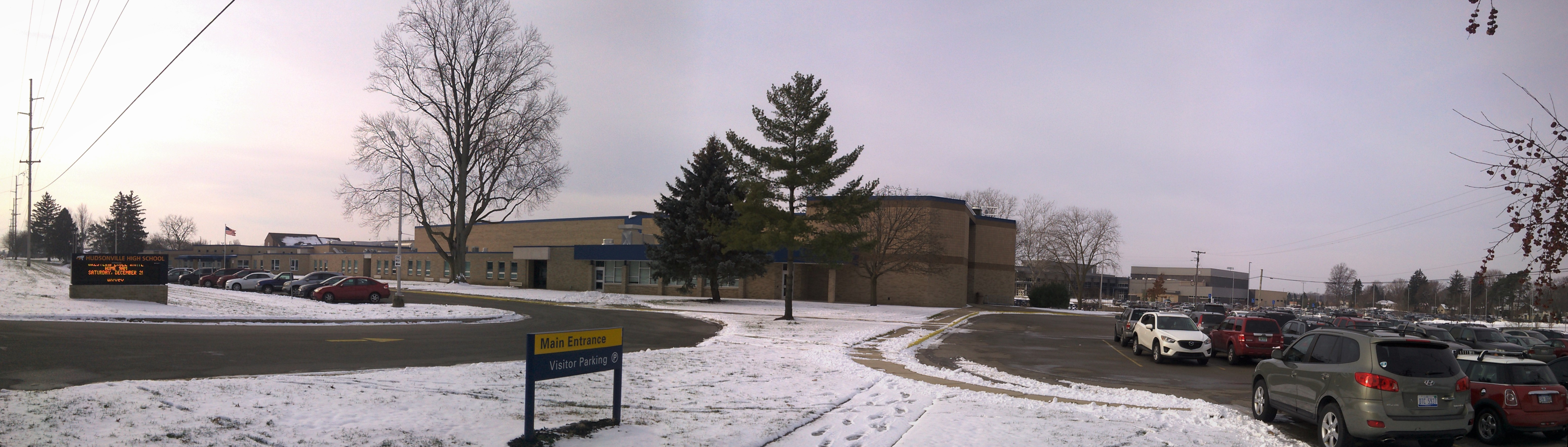

Location
- 5037 32nd Avenue; Hudsonville, Michigan 49426; United States
- Coordinates: 42°51′41″N 85°51′44″W

Information
- Type: Public secondary school
- Motto: Addressing the Needs of Every Student, Every Day
- School district: Hudsonville Public Schools
- Superintendent: Douglas VanderJagt
- Principal: Jordan Beel
- Teaching staff: 116.32 (on an FTE basis)
- Grades: 10–12
- Enrollment: 1,951 (2023-2024)
- Student to teacher ratio: 16.77
- Campus: Suburban
- Colors: Maize and blue
- Athletics conference: Ottawa-Kent Conference
- Nickname: Eagles
- Rival: Rockford High School (Michigan) and Grandville High School
- Newspaper: The Vantage Point
- Yearbook: The Pioneer
- Website: www.hudsonvillepublicschools.org/hudsonvillehigh/

Student assessments
- 2021–22 school year Change vs. prior year

M-STEP 11th grade proficiency rates (Science / Social Studies)
- Advanced %: 24.6 / 18.2
- Proficient %: 27.8 / 30.6
- PR. Proficient %: 14.3 / 38.1
- Not Proficient %: 33.3 / 13.1

Average test scores
- SAT Total: 1073.1 (▲ +15.1)

Hudsonville High School, is a public high school located in Hudsonville, Michigan. It serves grades 9-12 for the Hudsonville Public Schools.

It serves all of Hudsonville and small portions of Allendale and Jenison. It also includes the majority of Jamestown Charter Township and portions of the following townships: Blendon, Georgetown, and Zeeland, as well as a small portion of Allendale Charter Township.

== Facility ==
The present high school opened in fall 1963. VanderMeiden and Koteles was the architecture firm that designed the original building. The pool was expanded in 1990. In 1996, the freshman campus was established at 5535 School Avenue, in the former junior high school building.

In fall 2014, a new freshman campus opened on the site of the high school. It included a new pool and auditorium, which opened in fall 2015. GMB was the architecture firm.

As a result of the bond issue passed in 2019, a 3,700-seat arena and fitness center addition was built, as well as a connector between the high school and freshman campus and other additions. With the completion of these additions in December 2023, the high school is one of the largest in the state, at 580,000 square feet.

== Athletics ==
The Hudsonville Eagles competes in the Ottawa-Kent Conference. School colors are maize and blue. The following Michigan High School Athletic Association (MHSAA) sanctioned sports are offered:

- Baseball (boys)
- Basketball (girls and boys)
- Bowling (girls and boys)
- Competitive cheerleading (girls)
- Cross country (girls and boys)
- Football (boys)
- Golf (girls and boys)
- Ice hockey (boys)
- Lacrosse (girls and boys)
- Soccer (girls and boys)
- Softball (girls)
- Swim and dive (girls and boys)
- Tennis (girls and boys)
- Track (girls and boys)
- Volleyball (girls)
- Wrestling (boys)

== Notable alumni ==
Ray Bentley, National Football League (NFL) linebacker and sportscaster

- Kyle Clement, NFL defensive lineman
- Tyson DeVree, NFL tight end
- Joel Smeenge, NFL defensive lineman
- John Vander Wal, Major League Baseball (MLB) journeyman utility player
