= Hudsonville Public Schools =

School district in Michigan

Address
- 3886 Van Buren Hudsonville, Michigan, 49426; United States
- Coordinates: 42°52′13″N 85°52′42″W

District information
- Grades: PreK-12
- Superintendent: Dr. Douglas VanderJagt (2018-)
- Schools: 13
- Budget: US$147,920,000 (2022-2023 expenditures)
- NCES District ID: 2618840

Students and staff
- Students: 6,709 (2024-2025)
- Teachers: 419.23 FTE (2024-2025)
- Staff: 892.79 on FTE basis (2024-2025)
- Student–teacher ratio: 16.0 (2024-2025)
- Colors: Blue & Maize

Other information
- Website: www.hudsonvillepublicschools.org

Hudsonville Public Schools is a public school district in Ottawa County, Michigan. It serves the city of Hudsonville and parts of Jamestown, Blendon, Georgetown, and Zeeland townships. The district is a part of the Ottawa Area Intermediate School District.

== History ==
The present high school opened in fall 1963. VanderMeiden and Koteles was the architecture firm that designed the original building. The pool was expanded in 1990.

In 1996, the freshman campus was established at 5535 School Avenue, in the former junior high school building. This was made possible by the completion of Baldwin Street Middle School. Riley Street Middle School opened four years later.

Enrollment in the district grew every year between the 1999-2000 and 2019-2020 school years, adding 2,488 students during that twenty year period. A bond issue passed in 2011 to build Jamestown Lower Elementary and a new freshman campus on the site of the high school. In fall 2014, the new freshman campus opened northwest of the high school. The former freshman building became an early childhood center.

As a result of the bond issue passed in 2019, several additions were built at the high school, including a connector to the freshman center.

== Schools ==
Schools in Hudsonville Public Schools district
Schools	Address	Notes
Secondary Schools
Hudsonville High School	5155 32nd Avenue, Hudsonville	Grades 9-12. Opened fall 1963. Northwestern section opened 2014, and connected in 2023.
Baldwin Street Middle	3835 Baldwin Street, Hudsonville	Grades 7-8. Opened fall 1996.
Riley Street Middle	2745 Riley Street, Hudsonville	Grades 6-8. Opened fall 2000.
Elementary Schools
The 5/6 Building @ Georgetown	8175 36th Avenue, Hudsonville	Grades 5-6. Opened 2023.
Alward Elementary	3811 Port Sheldon St., Hudsonville	Grades K-4
Bauer Elementary	8136 48th Avenue, Hudsonville	Grades K-4
Forest Grove Elementary	1645 32nd Avenue, Hudsonville	Grades K-5
Georgetown Elementary	3909 Baldwin Street, Hudsonville	Grades K-4
Jamestown Lower Elementary	2522 Greenly, Hudsonville	Grades K-2. Opened fall 2013.
Jamestown Upper Elementary	3291 Lincoln Ct., Hudsonville	Grades 3-5
Park Elementary	5525 Park Avenue, Hudsonville	Grades K-4
South Elementary	4900 40th Avenue, Hudsonville	Grades K-5
Preschools
Early Childhood Center	5535 School Avenue, Hudsonville	preschool

== Awards ==
US Department of Education National Blue Ribbon School

- 2014 - Jamestown Elementary School
- 2015 - Forest Grove Elementary School
- 2016 - South Elementary School

Michigan Schools to Watch

- 2009 - Baldwin Street & Riley Street Middle Schools
- 2013 - Baldwin Street Middle School
- 2017 - Baldwin Street Middle School
