= Jamestown Charter Township, Michigan =

Jamestown Township, Michigan
- Charter township
- Jamestown Charter Township
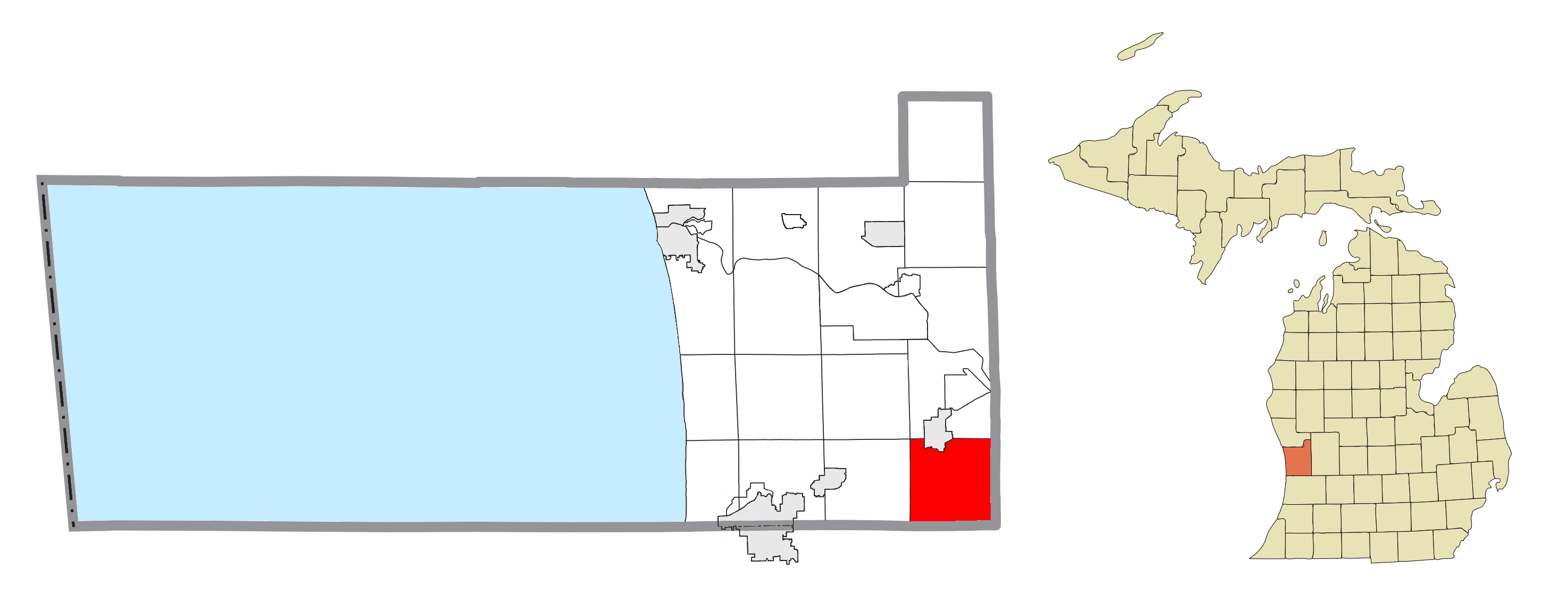
- Location within Ottawa County

- Location within the state of Michigan Location within the United States
- Coordinates: 42°49′12″N 85°50′24″W
- Country: United States
- State: Michigan
- County: Ottawa
- Established: 1849

Government
  - Supervisor: Laurie Van Haitsma
  - Clerk: Candy DeHaan

Area
  - Total: 35.48 sq mi (91.89 km^{2})
  - Land: 35.38 sq mi (91.63 km^{2})
  - Water: 0.10 sq mi (0.26 km^{2})
- Elevation: 720 ft (220 m)

Population (2020)
  - Total: 9,630
  - Density: 272.2/sq mi (105.1/km^{2})
- Time zone: EST
- ZIP code(s): 49315 (Byron Center); 49323 (Dorr); 49418 (Grandville); 49426 (Hudsonville); 49427 (Jamestown); 49464 (Zeeland)
- Area code: 616
- FIPS code: 26-41520
- GNIS feature ID: 1626537
- Website: Official website

Jamestown Charter Township is a charter township of Ottawa County, Michigan, United States. The population was 9,630 at the 2020 census.

== Communities ==
- Forest Grove – near Jamestown
- Gitchel – the area settled by S.L. Gitchel had a post office from 1886 until 1902.
- Jamestown – unincorporated community

== History ==
Interest in Jamestown Township had its beginning when Grandville on the east and Holland on the west was being settled. Rix Robinson induced people of the east to come this way and the area was covered with a fine forest. Grandville was the central point of settlement and land offices were established there. In 1831, the land was surveyed and labeled as Township 5, Range 13 West.

James Cronkright and his wife were the first settlers in the township. In 1843 they settled in Section 11 in where they built a 16 X 22 foot house. The closest neighbors were over four miles away and there were no roads. Bears, wolves, deer and other wild animals were common. Some were important for food. S.L. Gitchel first settled on the SW corner of Sec.1 in 1845 and finally on Sec.33. He became a specialist in making small bridges and corduroy roads. Monsur Brown, parents of Mrs. Gitchel, followed in 1846 settling in the SE corner of Sec. 11 with a son James M. Brown who was married three years later. He also settled in Sec.11. More families followed from the east but some Hollanders were entering from the west. Later Germans entered from the south.

Until 1849, Georgetown and Jamestown were under the same jurisdiction. All taxes were paid in Jenison. Evidently there were no printed blanks, for tax receipts were written out in full.

Twelve voters were required in what is now Jamestown before the towns could be separated. In 1849 there were a sufficient number and steps were taken to bring this about. The meeting took place at the James Cronkright Jr. home in Sec. 11. In April, Mrs. Cronkright prepared a dinner for the men and spent the day with her mother. Twelve men attended and were assisted by a Mr. James Scott from Grandville. Each was elected to an office.

Of the twelve men present one-third were named James, so this new township was named Jamestown. Six men living in the township were not there. It is believed that four men from the western part of the township could not yet speak English.

There were fifteen residents on the first 1849-tax roll covering seventeen parcels of land. These seventeen parcels were found in only 9 of the 36 sections of the township. Six of those sections were in the west one third of the township. Eleven family names were included in those fifteen residents.

In 1850, the town meeting was held at the Cronkright home again but the 1851 and 1852 meetings were held at the first log schoolhouse in Sec. 11. In 1853 it was held at the log schoolhouse in Jamestown Center, which was the second schoolhouse in the township. The Forest Grove log school was built in 1853 by the third district in the township, out of seven, that finally served the township's educational needs for many years.

=== Defunding of library system ===
In August 2022, 62% of township primary voters chose to defund the township's Patmos library system, which was initially expected to force the library to close in 2023. Before the vote, fewer than 50 township residents had complained about the presence of three books discussing the life stories of LGBT people: Gender Queer by Maia Kobabe, Kiss Number 8 by Colleen AF Venable, and Spinning by Tillie Walden. The activists who sought to defund the library system claimed that the presence of these books in the library's young adult and adult sections meant the library was trying to "groom" young children, with a prominent activist claiming that the book Gender Queer was pornographic. Community members also sent the library director angry messages on Facebook, attempted to film her without her permission, and accused her of not being of Christian faith; as a result of this treatment, the library director resigned. A second director and two staff members have also quit during the year due to harassment. The library board stood firm saying they would not participate in banning books. Due to the books not being banned the activist group, Jamestown Conservatives, advocated for removing the operating funds of the library.

According to the Library Board President, without the fund renewal, "the library will run out of money in 2023, jeopardizing its existence." In response to the threat of defunding the library, online fundraisers were created to help the library temporarily. At least two GoFundMe accounts were started to fund the library through 2023; and by Sunday, August 28, approximately 4,000 people had donated to the campaign, including a $50,000 donation from romance author Nora Roberts. By September 9, the campaign had successfully past the goal of $245,000.

Following the August 8th meeting, the library board agreed to have a November millage which initially used the same language as the August millage. This required a special election that was paid for by the library system due to the township not having any local elections in November. The November millage ended up being modified slightly for the special election. In the November election, the millage was again defeated; this time by 55% of township voters. Jamestown Conservatives had again pushed for the millage to be defeated.

== Geography ==
According to the United States Census Bureau, the township has a total area of 35.6 square miles (92 km^{2}), of which 35.6 square miles (92 km^{2}) is land and 0.03% is water.

== Demographics ==
As of the 2020 Census, Jamestown was home to 9,630 people and 2,695 households. The population density was 142.2 inhabitants per square mile (54.9/km^{2}) with 1,553 housing units at an average density of 43.6 per square mile (16.8/km^{2}). The racial makeup of the township was 97.97% White, 0.45% African American, 0.14% Native American, 0.53% Asian, 0.34% from other races, and 0.57% from two or more races. Hispanic or Latino of any race were 1.13% of the population.

There were 1,500 households, out of which 49.9% had children under the age of 18 living with them, 84.1% were married couples living together, 4.6% had a female householder with no husband present, and 9.7% were non-families. 8.3% of all households were made up of individuals, and 3.2% had someone living alone who was 65 years of age or older. The average household size was 3.37 and the average family size was 3.59.

The township population contained 34.9% under the age of 18, 8.9% from 18 to 24, 28.4% from 25 to 44, 21.9% from 45 to 64, and 5.9% who were 65 years of age or older. The median age was 31 years. For every 100 females, there were 101.3 males. For every 100 females age 18 and over, there were 101.4 males.

The median income for a household in the township was $68,689, and the median income for a family was $71,438. Males had a median income of $46,825 versus $27,688 for females. The per capita income for the township was $21,184. About 0.5% of families and 1.1% of the population were below the poverty line, including 1.5% of those under age 18 and none of those age 65 or over.

== Points of interest ==
=== Cemeteries ===
- Zutphen Cemetery
- Star Cemetery
- Forest Grove Cemetery
- Jamestown Cemetery

=== Lakes ===
- Mud Lake

== Education ==
Hudsonville Public School District includes most of the township. A portion is in the Grandville Public Schools.

Patmos Library is located at 2445 Riley Street of Jamestown.
