= Kiss Number 8 =

Graphic novel by Colleen A. F. Venable

- Cover of Kiss Number 8
- Author: Colleen AF Venable
- Illustrator: Ellen T. Crenshaw
- Language: English
- Genre: Young adult fiction, Romance
- Publisher: First Second
- Publication date: March 12, 2019
- ISBN: 9781596437098

Kiss Number 8 is a 2019 graphic novel written by Colleen A. F. Venable, illustrated by Ellen T. Crenshaw, and published by First Second Books. In 2019, the novel was longlisted for the National Book Award for Young People's Literature. The following year, it was a finalist for an Eisner Award and Prism Award.

The novel follows the protagonist's experiences through a series of horrible kisses and humorously explores her sexuality, family, and faith.

== Reception ==
=== Reviews ===
Kiss Number 8 received starred reviews from Kirkus Reviews and Publishers Weekly, who respectively called the novel a "rare blend of tender and revolutionary" and a "queer coming-of-age story that earns its powerful emotional impact."

The New York Times's Jen Doll wrote, "Venable's frequently heartbreaking recollection of the abuse and torment that people went through for being 'different' — and the fact that it still happens all too frequently — is a powerful reminder of how far we still have to go."

School Library Journal called the book "thought-provoking" and a "solid addition to YA shelves."

=== Awards and honors ===
In 2019, the New York Public Library included Kiss Number 8 on its list of the best books for teens published that year. The following year, the book was included on the Texas Maverick Graphic Novel Reading List and the TAYSHAS Reading List.

Year	Award	Result	Ref.
2019	National Book Award for Young People's Literature	Longlist	
2020	Eisner Award for Best Publication for Teens	Finalist	
2020	Great Graphic Novels for Teens	Top 10	
2020	Quick Picks for Reluctant Young Adult Readers	Top 10	
2020	Prism Award for Mainstream Publisher	Finalist	

=== Controversy ===
In the summer of 2021, at a Leander Independent School District board meeting, a parent complained about In the Dream House, a memoir by Carmen Maria Machado, which led to a review of all the books on the district's Language Arts Reading List. Eight books, including Kiss Number 8, were ultimately removed.

In August 2022, 62% of Jamestown Charter Township residents voted to defund their public library system after librarians refused to remove three books from the library's shelves: Gender Queer by Maia Kobabe, Kiss Number 8, and Spinning by Tillie Walden. Community activists claimed that the presence of these books in the library's young adult and adult sections meant the library was trying to "groom" young children. According to Library Board President Larry Walton, without fund renewal, "the library will run out of money in 2023, jeopardizing its existence." Despite not wanting to close the library, Walton has stated that the board refuses to ban the books.
