= Spinning (comics) =

2017 graphic novel memoir by Tillie Walden

- The front cover of the graphic novel
- Date: September 12, 2017
- Page count: 400 pages
- Publisher: First Second Books (US); SelfMadeHero (UK)

Creative team
- Writers: Tillie Walden
- Artists: Tillie Walden
- ISBN: 978-1-62672-772-4

Spinning is a graphic novel memoir by cartoonist Tillie Walden that was first published by First Second Books on September 12, 2017. The memoir chronicles Walden's years coming-of-age as a competitive figure skater, as she navigates romance, bullying and various traumas. It won the 2018 Eisner Award for Best Reality-Based Work.

== Synopsis ==
At the start of Spinning, Walden is ten and her family has just moved to Texas from New Jersey. Walden, a competitive figure skater, finds herself having to adjust to the new environment and figure skating culture. As Walden becomes more disenchanted with the culture around the competitive sport, she discovers her talent as an artist. Having known she was gay since she was five, Walden also struggles with the alienation and pressure she faces as she embarks on her first romance with another girl. The novel also recounts Walden's sexual assault by her SAT tutor.

== Development ==
The idea for Spinning first came to Tillie Walden when she attempted to make a short comic about ice skating at the end of her first year at the Center for Cartoon Studies. Walden realized that she had "too much baggage with skating to even make a small comic about it," and began working on the book that summer before her second year. Spinning was initially Walden's school thesis and upon graduating, she worked with First Second Books to turn her thesis into the final graphic novel.

Having published three fictional graphic novels before Spinning, Walden noted that it was a lot harder, but far more rewarding, to write the memoir than works of fiction. According to Walden, revisiting the trauma she faced was difficult and "there were scenes in Spinning where [she] just cried the entire time [she] drew it."

== Reception ==
In her review, Rachel Cooke of The Guardian wrote: "Intimate and charming, Spinning already has the feeling of a coming-of-age classic – and yet, amazingly, its talented author has only just hit 21." The New York Times's Douglas Wolk described the novel as "engrossing, gorgeously quiet", while The Austin Chronicle's Wayne Alan Brenner called it a "powerful work of real-life storytelling". Publishers Weekly noted that the memoir is "a haunting and resonant coming-of-age story," while Booklist's Sarah Hunter called it "a stirring, gorgeously illustrated story of finding the strength to follow one's own path."

The Daily Dot's Gavia Baker-Whitelaw concluded that: "Spinning is a raw and intimate memoir, and likely to appear on many “best-of” lists for 2017. It's honest and sensitive, holding a different appeal for a wide range of viewpoints. As a coming-out story, it's painful and therapeutic. To figure skaters, the depictions of the sport and its culture will doubtless ring true. And for childhood overachievers, it's a firsthand observation by someone who grew up and escaped through an unexpected avenue."

The A.V. Club's Oliver Sava named Spinning as one of the best comics of 2017, and it was tied for third place in Publishers Weekly 2017 Graphic Novel Critics Poll. The novel won the 2018 Eisner Award for Best Reality-Based Work, making Walden one of the youngest Eisner Award winners ever at 22.

=== Challenges ===
In August 2022, 62% of voters in Jamestown Charter Township voted to defund their public library system after librarians refused to remove three books from the library's shelves: Gender Queer by Maia Kobabe, Kiss Number 8 by Colleen A. F. Venable, and Spinning by Tillie Walden. Community activists claimed that the presence of these books in the library's young adult and adult sections meant the library was trying to "groom" young children. According to Library Board President Larry Walton, without fund renewal, "the library will run out of money in 2023, jeopardizing its existence." Despite not wanting to close the library, Walton has stated that the board refuses to ban the books.
