= Gender Queer: A Memoir =

2019 graphic memoir

- 1st Edition cover art illustrated by Maia Kobabe.
- Date: May 28, 2019
- Publisher: Lion Forge Comics; Oni Press

Creative team
- Writers: Maia Kobabe
- Artists: Maia Kobabe
- Colorists: Phoebe Kobabe

Gender Queer: A Memoir is a 2019 American graphic memoir written and illustrated by Maia Kobabe. It recounts Kobabe's journey from adolescence to adulthood and the author's exploration of gender identity and sexuality, ultimately identifying as being outside of the gender binary.

Gender Queer involves topics such as gender euphoria, gender dysphoria, and asexuality using both narrative and illustrations. They begin telling their story from childhood to the present day and include many important experiences in their life: their first period, learning about what it means to be transgender, first relationship, and numerous others.

Gender Queer initially received a small printing and was marketed toward older teens and adults. It increasingly entered the collections of high school and middle school libraries after receiving an Alex Award in 2020, an award given by the American Library Association to "books written for adults that have special appeal to young adults ages 12 through 18." Since 2021, its inclusion in American libraries, particularly school libraries, has been frequently challenged, based on the presence of sexually explicit illustrations. The American Library Association ranked it as the most challenged book in 2021, 2022, and 2023. The book holds the Guinness World Record for "Most banned book of the year".

== Composition and publication ==
After coming out as non-binary in 2016, Kobabe (who uses the Spivak pronouns, e/em/eir) began drawing black-and-white cartoons about their experience with their gender identity, and publishing them on Instagram. They later used these cartoons as the basis for Gender Queer. They stated that they were motivated in part by their difficulty in explaining their gender to their parents after coming out. Kobabe outlined the book by revisiting their high school and college journals, pulling out their confusions about gender and the words they felt they could not say to people. They were inspired by books like Fun Home (2006), by Alison Bechdel, but they wrote the memoir because they could not find the right book to explain their thoughts on gender for their family.

2022 cover of the graphic novel Gender Queer: A Memoir Deluxe Edition

Gender Queer was published by Lion Forge Comics on May 28, 2019, receiving a small initial print run of 5,000 copies. The book was marketed to adults and older teens, and Kobabe has stated that their intended audience was 16-plus. Following Lion Forge's merger with Oni Press in May 2019, Oni–Lion Forge Publishing Group (OLFPG) has continued to republish Gender Queer now under their Oni Press imprint. In July 2022, a new hardcover edition was released by Oni Press with a foreword by ND Stevenson and an afterword by Kobabe. Also in 2022, a French edition of Gender Queer was published by Casterman with translation by Anne-Charlotte Husson and letters by Jean-Francois Rey.

Gender Queer: The Annotated Edition was released in May 2026. This expanded edition features commentary from Kobabe as well as comments from artists, comics creators, and academics such as Jadzia Axelrod, Andrea Colvin, Sandra Cox, Ashley R. Guillory, Justin Hall, Kori Michele Handwerker, Phoebe Kobabe, Ajuan Mance, Matthew Noe, Hal Schrieve, Rani Som, Shannon Watters.

== Critical reception ==
Publishers Weekly's February 2019 review stated that "this heartfelt graphic memoir relates, with sometimes painful honesty, the experience of growing up non-gender-conforming. [...] This entertaining memoir-as-guide holds crossover appeal for mature teens (with a note there's some sexually explicit content) and is sure to spark valuable discussions at home and in classrooms." The graphic novel was also included in Publishers Weekly's December 2019 "PW Graphic Novel Critics Poll" – Heidi MacDonald wrote that Gender Queer is "an immensely sympathetic memoir of self-discovery, rendered in clean, elegant art, that should become a queer comics classic." Tegan O'Neil, for The Comics Journal in 2019, commented that "more than simply a memoir, the book is designed to explain the very concept of being non-binary, beginning with the author's first memories of gender and ending with the discovery of Spivak pronouns (e, em, eir) and eir first steps towards getting the people around em to accept and understand said pronouns. [...] Part of the book details eir sexual history, as well as a series of terrifying and painful trips to the OBGYN, and even in the most sensitive areas Kobabe's art and storytelling remains both personable and clear."

Jenni Frencham, for the School Library Journal in 2019, called the graphic novel a "great resource for those who identify as nonbinary or asexual as well as for those who know someone who identifies that way and wish to better understand" and stated that it "will resonate with teens, especially fans of Alison Bechdel's Fun Home and Mason Deaver's I Wish You All the Best." Jacob Roden, for The News-Gazette in 2020, wrote that "due to the format, the book is easily digestible in a single sitting, and Kobabe holds the reader's hand every step of the way into the weeds of gender construction. [...] I heartily recommend this book to anyone interested in learning the basics of gender identity. LGBTQ+ folks will especially appreciate the coming out/coming-of-age story and the frequent allusions to queer icons." Sophie Brown, for GeekMom in 2022, commented that "Gender Queer isn't an especially easy book to read but it is a powerful one" and that for someone questioning their identity, "Gender Queer will be a comforting voice from someone who has walked the same paths."

Publishers Weekly viewed Kobabe as "a straightforward cartoonist who uses the medium skillfully (if not particularly stylishly), incorporating ample cheery colors, with a script that's refreshingly smooth and nondidactic for the topic". Roden called the art style "economical, demonstrative, unpretentious, colorful" and highlighted that the writing conveys Kobabe's "experiences with purpose and candor in every panel." O'Neil commented that the "art is very readable and, above all, accommodating. E lays out eir personal history with an enviable degree of candor" and that "Phoebe Kobabe's colors are strong throughout, a palette of soft pastels and earth tones to communicate a range of emotions." Frencham noted that "the muted earth tones and calm blues match the hopeful tone and measured pacing. Matter-of-fact descriptions of gynecological exams and the use of sex toys will be enlightening for those who may not have access to this information elsewhere." Brown also highlighted some "harrowing moments" in the book – "Kobabe's first experience going for a pap smear was especially traumatic and resonated with me more than I expected, as I suspect it might for many of us who have had to undergo that procedure while uncomfortable with our bodies and sexualities. Other difficult moments included shopping for undergarments, exploring masturbation, and dating. While all these moments are difficult to read, they are handled beautifully and with a sense of both solidarity and the knowledge that things will eventually get better."

=== Awards ===
In 2020, Gender Queer was one of ten books to receive an Alex Award from the American Library Association, for "books written for adults that have special appeal to young adults ages 12 through 18." In the same year, the book was also a finalist for the Stonewall Book Award for non-fiction. These awards led to the book becoming more widely available in school libraries.

== Sexual imagery ==
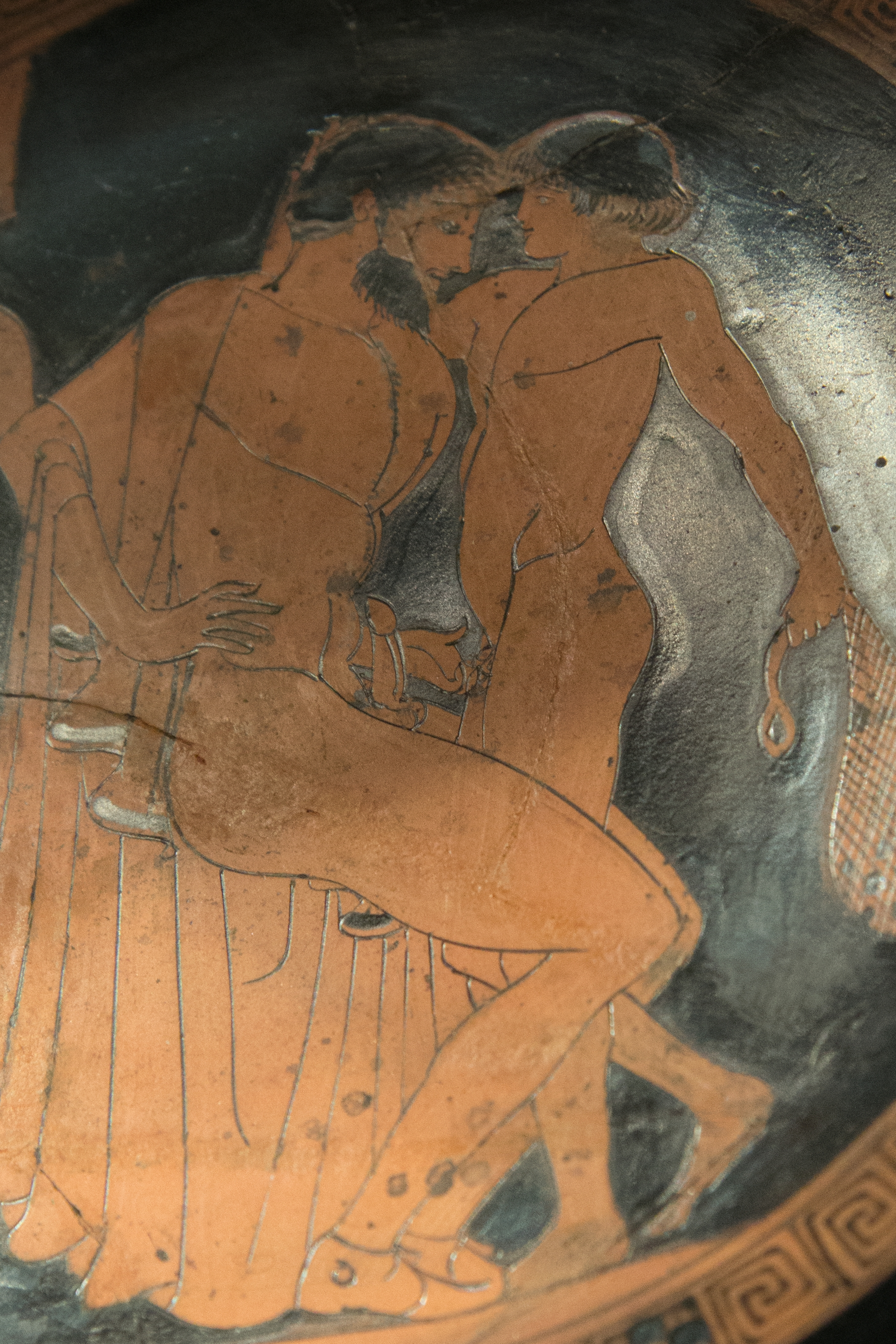
A controversial illustration in Gender Queer is based on this piece of red-figure pottery attributed to the Brygos Painter.

Gender Queer includes a handful of sexually explicit illustrations which have been used to argue that the book is inappropriate for minors. The age recommendations for the book vary – the American "School Library Journal in 2019, in one of several reviews, said it can be appropriate for students in grades 9 and up — typically ages 14 to 15. Barnes & Noble says it's appropriate for ages 15 and older. Amazon recommends it for ages 18 and older". The Australian Classification Board (ACB) does not recommend the book for those under 15.

In one commonly cited panel, a 14-year-old Kobabe fantasizes about a scene in which an older man touches the penis of a youth. The illustration is based on a piece of painted ancient Greek pottery depicting a "courting scene." Detractors have described this as a depiction of pedophilia. Another illustration frequently cited by critics depicts Kobabe's girlfriend performing oral sex on Kobabe while Kobabe wears a strap-on dildo. The book also includes depiction of masturbation. The ACB found the book's "descriptions and depictions of sexual activity" as "an integral part of the story on the author's struggle to understanding gender identity and sexuality, and the sex is highly stylised and containing little or no realistic detail, as well as infrequent". On the Plato's Symposium image, the ACB noted that it was "highly stylised" and no sexual activity is depicted "in a detailed or realistic manner, and it is not possible to determine the age of the two male figures in the image", noting "the most that can accurately be said is that the panel contains a depiction of an older-looking male and a younger-looking male".

These sexually explicit illustrations have been widely reproduced (sometimes in censored form) by critics of the book on social media, at school board meetings, and on conservative television programs. The American conservative advocacy group Independent Women's Forum attempted to purchase air time for an advertisement including imagery from Gender Queer but it was rejected as too graphic. The inclusion of Gender Queer in American public libraries and particularly school libraries has been the subject of numerous challenges beginning in 2021, with objections focusing on a handful of sexually explicit illustrations. Stephanie Mencimer, writing for the progressive website Mother Jones, argues that critics of the book have misrepresented the book as pornographic by focusing on a small number of explicit illustrations, which are generally presented without context.

== Censorship ==
=== United States ===
Gender Queer has been described as being at the center of a larger wave of challenges to books with LGBT content that began in 2021, which has included other books like Lawn Boy and All Boys Aren't Blue. The American Library Association ranked it as the most challenged book in 2021, 2022, and 2023, the second-most challenged book in 2024, and the third-most challenged book in 2025.

Kobabe has stated that the book's sales have increased following the challenges, and that the controversy has raised their profile. They have urged those who would challenge the book to read it in its entirety, rather than passing judgement based on a small number of images. Tara Lehmann, publicity director at Oni Press, said to Publishers Weekly in June 2022 that "selling more copies doesn't fix the intrinsic problem: people are trying to police what others read. We are against the banning of books, of any kind" and she added "that Oni supports schools, libraries, and organizations as best it can, but 'our main focus is being supportive of Maia and making sure we're doing the most we can to ensure Gender Queer is available to any and all people who want to read it'."

==== Community censorship in public and school libraries ====
===== Schools =====
The book challenges to Gender Queer gained national attention after a September 23, 2021 Fairfax County School Board meeting, when parent Stacy Langton spoke out against the inclusion of Gender Queer and Lawn Boy in the library of her teenager's high school. Langton brought posters bearing enlarged sexually explicit illustrations from Gender Queer and read from a scene in which Kobabe's girlfriend sends them sexually explicit text messages such as "I cannot wait to have your cock in my mouth." Langton had her microphone cut mid-presentation, which elicited jeers from audience members. Langton's testimony was censored in the official footage of the meeting uploaded by the board, but uncensored footage was captured and uploaded to social media, where it went viral. The story was widely covered by conservative media, such as The Daily Wire, which used the headline "WATCH: School Board Squirms as Mom Reads Them The Gay Porn In Books Available To Students," and on Fox News, which interviewed Langton on its morning show Fox & Friends. Soon after the meeting, the Fairfax County School Board pulled the book from its library collections, but reinstated it months later following an investigation of the book's content.

According to a report from PEN America, school library book bans grew to a "full-fledged social and political movement powered by local, state, and national groups" in the 2021–22 school year. While this censorship movement originally focused on "discussions of race and racism, over the past year, it morphed to include a heightened focus on LGBTQ+ issues and identities". The report identified Gender Queer as the most frequently challenged book, banned in 41 school districts.

Moms for Liberty, a conservative group founded in Florida in 2020 with chapters around the country, have been leading many of the school board debates about Gender Queer and other LGBTQ+ books. In response to Moms for Liberty, a group called Defense of Democracy was formed in New York in 2022 and has since spread to eight states.

===== Library responses to censorship =====
In response to the growing book censorship movement in the United States, the Brooklyn Public Library opened its library ecard to any individual, ages 13–21, for a limited time under the program Books Unbanned starting in April 2022.

In August 2022, 62% of Jamestown Charter Township, Michigan residents voted to defund their public library system after librarians refused to remove three books from the library's shelves: Gender Queer, Kiss Number 8 by Colleen A. F. Venable, and Spinning by Tillie Walden. Prior to the vote, two librarians quit after being harassed about the book Gender Queer. Community activists claimed that the presence of these books in the library's young adult and adult sections meant the library was trying to "groom" young children. According to Library Board President Larry Walton, without fund renewal, "the library will run out of money in 2023, jeopardizing its existence." In response to the threat of defunding the library, at least two GoFundMe accounts were started to fund the library through 2023; and by Sunday, August 28, approximately 4,000 people had donated to the campaign, including a $50,000 donation from romance author, Nora Roberts. Attached to Roberts' GoFundMe donation was a note that said, "Libraries and librarians should be valued and celebrated, never attacked and demeaned." In total, $250,000 was raised, which would support keeping the library open for a year or more. A second vote to fund the library for a decade failed in November 2022. After the second vote, two local business owners donated $100,000 to keep the library open. In early December the library closed early one day in response to threats against library staff.

In Bonner's Ferry, Idaho, the public library director resigned in August 2022 after harassment related to banning books, and Gender Queer in particular. At a Meridian, Idaho, library board meeting in the fall of 2022 the library director stated, "I'm a fourth-generation Idahoan. I've worked in libraries for over two decades. I have never seen this level of vitriol, hate, and thinly veiled threats of violence at libraries." In February 2023, a group of residents in Meridian, Idaho filed a petition to eliminate the Meridian Library District in order to restrict access to books they deemed offensive, including Gender Queer. A public hearing allowed comments from Meridian residents on March 20, 2023. The library board for the Ada Community Library in Ada County, Idaho, (a separate library system from the Boise and Meridian library systems which are also located within the county) in March 2023 voted to remove six books from circulation, including Gender Queer, for being "harmful to minors." However, the decision was reversed in April 2023, as the board had violated the Idaho Open Meeting Law because the vote occurred "without noting an action item on the agenda."

==== Politics ====
Numerous conservative politicians in the United States have challenged Gender Queer and other books, including Ron DeSantis, Republican governor of Florida. Henry McMaster, Republican governor of South Carolina, called for an investigation into "obscene and pornographic" material such as Gender Queer in the state's schools. The book was seen as having a significant impact on the 2021 Virginia gubernatorial election race between Republican Glenn Youngkin and Democrat Terry McAuliffe. During the last debate between the two candidates, Youngkin referred to the viral Fairfax County School Board meeting incident which had occurred just five days earlier:

What we've seen over the course of this last 20 months is our school systems refusing to engage with parents. In fact, in Fairfax County this past week, we watched parents get upset because there was such sexually explicit material in the library they had never seen. It was shocking. And in fact, you vetoed the bill that would have informed parents that they were there.

The bill referred to by Youngkin applied only to assigned reading, not books like Gender Queer which were merely present in a school's library. In his response to Youngkin, McAuliffe stated "I don't think parents should be telling schools what to teach." This was widely interpreted as a critical gaffe which contributed to McAuliffe's ultimate loss. Soon after the debate, Youngkin's campaign began running a campaign advertisement which juxtaposed McAuliffe's statement with footage from the Fairfax County board meeting.

In the summer of 2022, Patriot Mobile Action – a conservative political action committee (PAC) – backed the elections of 11 school board members in Texas's Carroll, Grapevine-Colleyville, Keller, and Mansfield School districts. In addition to monetary support, they contracted with top conservative political consulting firms and helped these 11 candidates win school board seats. Following the wins, the Patriot Mobile Action's executive Director stated that their aim is to eliminate "critical race theory" and "LGBTQ indoctrination" from schools. In August and September 2022, the Keller Independent School District made national and international headlines when it removed 42 books from library shelves, including Gender Queer, the day before school began.

In September 2022, the Maine Families First political action committee and the American Principles Project launched efforts in the 2022 Maine gubernatorial election focused on banning Gender Queer. The American Principles project described these efforts as a multimillion-dollar effort to "hold Democrats accountable for grooming our kids." A spokesperson for Janet Mills, the incumbent Democratic governor, stated, "Maine parents don't want a governor interfering in that process, to dictate what books should or shouldn't be in their kids' classroom." In October 2022, the American Principles Project paid for TV ads against the Michigan Democratic governor, Gretchen Whitmer, that feature a narrator reading passages of Gender Queer while red letters display "stop grooming our kids." On March 22, 2023, the Illinois House of Representatives passed a bill prohibiting libraries from banning books. Anne Stava-Murray specifically mentioned Gender Queer and attempts to remove the book from shelves by the Proud Boys and others while debating the bill.

==== Legal challenges ====
In June 2022, Virginian politicians Tim Anderson and Tommy Altman sued Kobabe and Oni–Lion Forge Publishing Group (OLFPG) over Gender Queer by "citing an obscure state obscenity law" and alleged that the graphic novel is "obscene for unrestricted viewing by minors." In response, OLFPG filed a "Demurrer and Motion to Dismiss" which "argues that the petition 'grossly mischaracterizes the nature and subject' of Gender Queer, and that the arguments that the petition submits are irrelevant to the suit and contradicted by the rest of the book. [...] Overall, Oni-Lion Forge Publishing Group argues that the petitioner 'lacks standing' and has not made a strong enough case to establish standing in their argument." The ACLU, "which is representing a group of local bookstores, as well as library and free speech organizations," has also filed a "Motion to Dismiss" – the ACLU's motion highlights "if the court decides that the book is obscene, then selling or distributing it anywhere in the state would be a crime. Retailers could be prosecuted for selling the book without being officially informed that it is obscene. In addition, retailers outside of Virginia Beach could be prosecuted for selling a book that was only determined to be obscene in one county." On August 30, 2022, a Virginia Beach circuit court judge dismissed the petition against Gender Queer; Judge Pamela S. Baskervill wrote that the cited obscenity law was "unconstitutional on its face in that it authorizes a prior restraint that violates the First Amendment and the Constitution of Virginia".

In November 2022, ACLU Texas filed an Office for Civil Rights (OCR) complaint over the Keller Independent School District's ban on books about gender fluidity. The district's policy bans any library book that includes or mentions a transgender or non-binary person, including fictional characters or historical figures; Gender Queer was banned by the district in August 2022. The OCR complaint states that "to assert that the mere presence of a transgender or non-binary character would render a book sexually explicit or age-inappropriate is inflammatory, inaccurate, and discriminatory."

On December 6, 2022, The US Education Department's Office of Civil Rights notified Granbury Independent School District in Northern Texas that it had opened an investigation following a July complaint from the ACLU accusing the district of violating federal law, Title IX, that prohibits discrimination based on sexual orientation and gender. The complaint came after the school district superintendent was secretly recorded talking to district librarians and telling them, "There are two genders. There's male and there's female" and then he went on to say, "there's no place for it in our libraries." In the same meeting he told librarians to remove "the 850 books that were put forth by Representative Krause...plus any that that we think that do not conform." Gender Queer is among the 850 books on Krause's list. This is the first federal investigation tied to the nationwide movement in the US to ban library books dealing with sexuality and gender.

=== Australia ===
On March 9, 2023, Queensland police flagged Gender Queer to the Department of Communications and Art, which oversees the Australian Classification Board (ACB), for review after a complaint by a conservative activist. The ACB has the power to censor, restrict, or ban literature, film, and other content. Mark Saunokonoko, for 9News, highlighted on March 20 that "a decision is likely in the next 25 days, and there are several routes the ACB may choose to take, ranging from age restrictions on who can read and buy the book through to an outright ban." The complaint also led Logan City Council to remove the book from library shelves, however, Gender Queer was still available by request. Jane Sullivan, The Sydney Morning Herald book columnist and reviewer wrote, "If there's one thing I hope Australia never imports from the US, it's that country's raging appetite for banning books. But there are signs the culture wars have reached our shores." She went on to say that she hopes the ACB will "resist" the effort to censor Gender Queer.

In early April 2023, the ACB gave Gender Queer an "unrestricted classification" but with "consumer advice" of "M (Mature) — Not Recommended for Readers Under 15 Years". The consumer advice does not constitute a legal restriction on its sale or availability. Classification Board Director Fiona Jolly said, "within the context of the publication, the treatment of themes is not high in impact or offensive," and, "the treatment of sex and nudity is also not high in impact and is not exploitative, offensive, gratuitous or very detailed." Rightwing activists appealed the board's decision leading the board to collect additional public "submissions on the classification"; the board received over 500 submissions, leading to a delay in the appeal review. In July 2023, the review board decided to keep the M classification stating that:

The content of the publication is justified in context, is appropriate for its intended audience of people who are interested in the author or interested in the subjects of gender identity and asexuality, and has a positive tone and character as well as many layers of positive messaging.

The Guardian Australia noted that "the review board found the depictions of sex and nudity in the book were justified in the context of a nonfiction memoir describing the author's lived experience". This assessment was then challenged in court by "rightwing activist Bernard Gaynor" and in October 2024, the review board was ordered to re-review "its assessment of the book Gender Queer, after the federal court found the board had ignored, overlooked or misunderstood public submissions for it to be censored". A newly assembled board, none of whom participated in the original decision, then ruled in April 2025 that Gender Queer "was approved for distribution in Australia on the same classification as the earlier ruling". This board highlighted that of the 526 public submissions received, "the 'significant majority' of submissions called for the book to be banned"; however, the board noted that this included "82 identical submissions made from a Citizen Go online petition" and "some submissions used concerns that Gaynor had sent out in an email to his supporters, with 50 appearing to have been cut and paste directly from Gaynor's email". As a result, the board commented that these submissions cannot "be assumed" to be "representative of the broader community's views". Heidi MacDonald of The Beat noted that they "also downplayed the claims that the book is pornographic".

=== Poland ===
Gender Queer has been available in Poland since 2021. In January 2025, Telewizja Republika ran a news report accusing the Museum of Modern Art, Warsaw of "depravity" for stocking the book in its store. The following month, the opposition Law and Justice (PiS) party reported the museum to prosecutors for alleged child pornography. Karol Nawrocki, the PiS-backed candidate in the 2025 Polish presidential election who was later elected president, shredded a copy of the book's cover on the campaign trail in an attack on rival candidate Rafał Trzaskowski, the mayor of Warsaw and an advocate for LGBT rights.

=== Canada ===
In May 2025, Alberta's education minister Demetrios Nicolaides announced the introduction of an "age-appropriate" book policy in school libraries which "would apply to public, separate, francophone, charter and independent schools". Gender Queer was one of four examples which led to the development of this policy after Nicolaides received parental complaints; notably, all four examples of objectionable materials are graphic novels depicting coming-of-age and LGBTQ subjects. Nicolaides stated, "this is not a question of banning specific books or specific titles but rather establishing clear policies and guidelines for all school divisions to follow". Laura Winton, president of the Library Association of Alberta, stated that neither the Library Association nor "public school boards were contacted" before this announcement. Following the release of the ministerial order in July 2025, Alberta Teachers' Association president Jason Schilling released a statement opposing the "order, saying it may make students believe 'some expressions of their gender and sexual identities are shameful and should be hidden away'" and that "the sweeping scope of this ministerial order will result in the removal of valuable and inclusive resources from our libraries".

A parental rights group, Parents for Choice in Education (PCE), and a conservative Christian lobbying group, Action4Canada, later took credit for supplying Nicolaides with the book titles they wanted removed from school libraries. Brett McKay of the Investigative Journalism Foundation (IJF) explained that PCE "has previously taken issue with sexual orientation and gender identity (SOGI) education in schools, gay-straight alliance laws and other 2SLGBTQ-related policies" and Action4Canada "promotes deeply conspiratorial beliefs" in regards to these issues. Mel Woods of Xtra Magazine argued that while Nicolaides stated this originated with "concerned parents", this is part of "coordinated movements and efforts to target these books in specific". Woods highlighted both the report by IJF as well as movements in the United States to target these books along with the "larger political context of what's happening in Alberta". In September 2025, Temur Durrani of The Globe and Mail reported that "the Alberta government is altering its controversial ministerial order for the removal of books in schools across the province, extensively revising the restrictions to only include visual depictions of sexual acts" and that "the written word, particularly classic literature," will be excluded from order scheduled to go into effect in January 2026.

In April 2026, Alberta's United Conservative Party government then introduced a bill restricting access to sexually graphic visual content in public libraries for children ages 15 and under; this bill also adds the ability for public libraries to be reviewed by the municipal affairs minister. Municipal Affairs Minister Dan Williams showcased Gender Queer and Blankets (2003) by Craig Thompson as examples of literature that the provincial government had been hearing about "informally", which contributed to the bill's development. The Coalition of Alberta Public Libraries, which represents Alberta's 324 public library services, stated "none of its members were consulted about the bill" and "called the bill an 'act of censorship'". Matthew Scace of The Globe and Mail reported that the bill is part of a broader set of policies introduced in recent years by Premier Danielle Smith's government and highlighted that following the 2025 school library ministerial order, Alberta "faced accusations of book banning from education and free-speech advocates and raised the ire of numerous authors, including Canadian literary icon Margaret Atwood".

== Editions ==
Title	Format	Publisher	Publication date	Pages	ISBN	Ref
Gender Queer: A Memoir	Trade paperback	Lion Forge Comics	May 31, 2019	240	ISBN 978-1-5493-0400-2	
Gender Queer (French Edition)	Hardcover	Casterman	May 5, 2022	240	ISBN 9782203224322	
Gender Queer: A Memoir Deluxe Edition	Hardcover	Oni Press	July 5, 2022	240	ISBN 978-1-63715-072-6	
Gender Queer: The Annotated Edition	Hardcover	Oni Press	May 19, 2026	272	ISBN 979-8-89488-082-2	

== See also ==
- Anti-LGBT curriculum laws in the United States
- Book censorship in the United States
