= Blendon Township, Michigan =

- Civil township
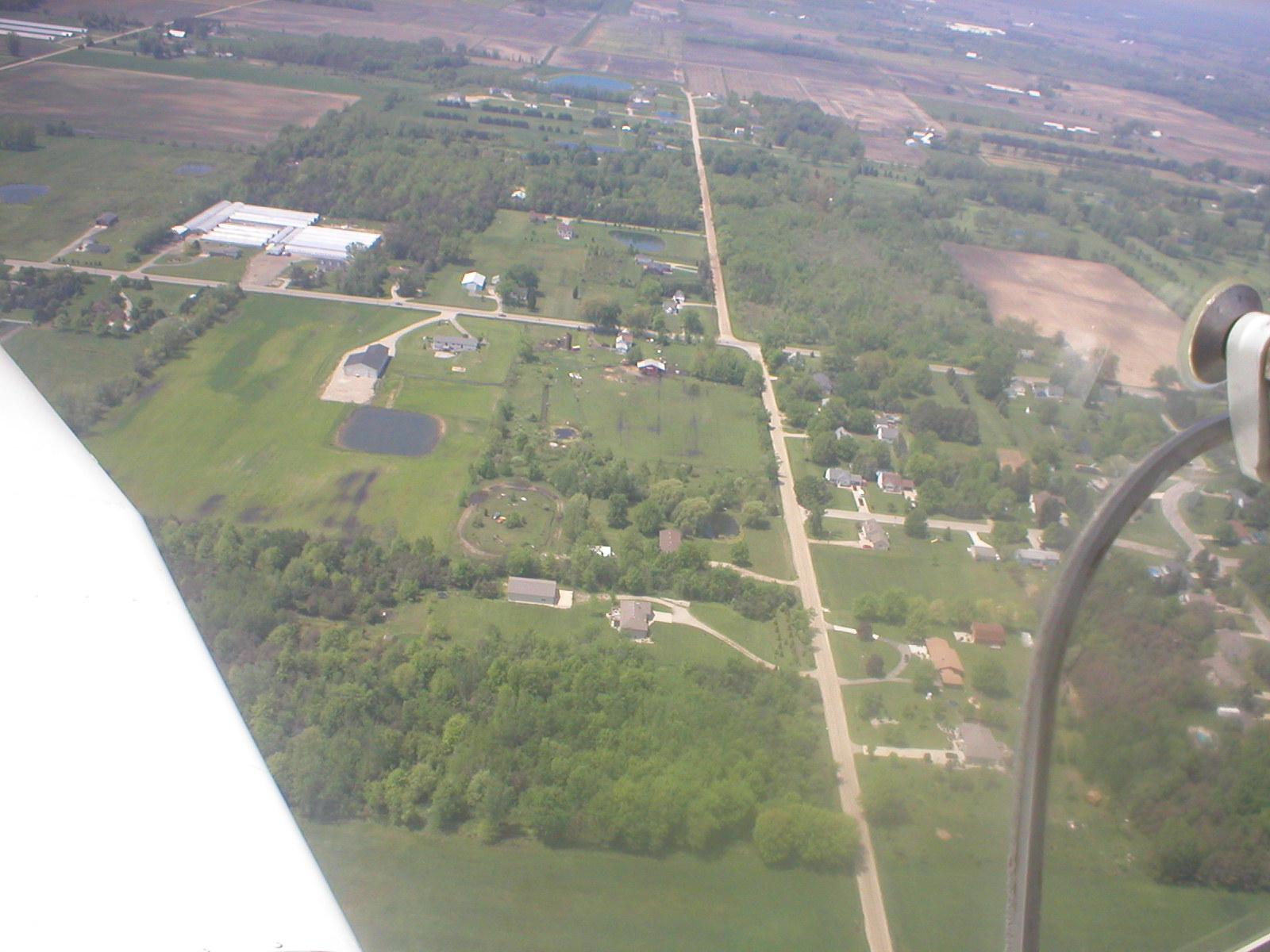
- Aerial view of the community of Borculo

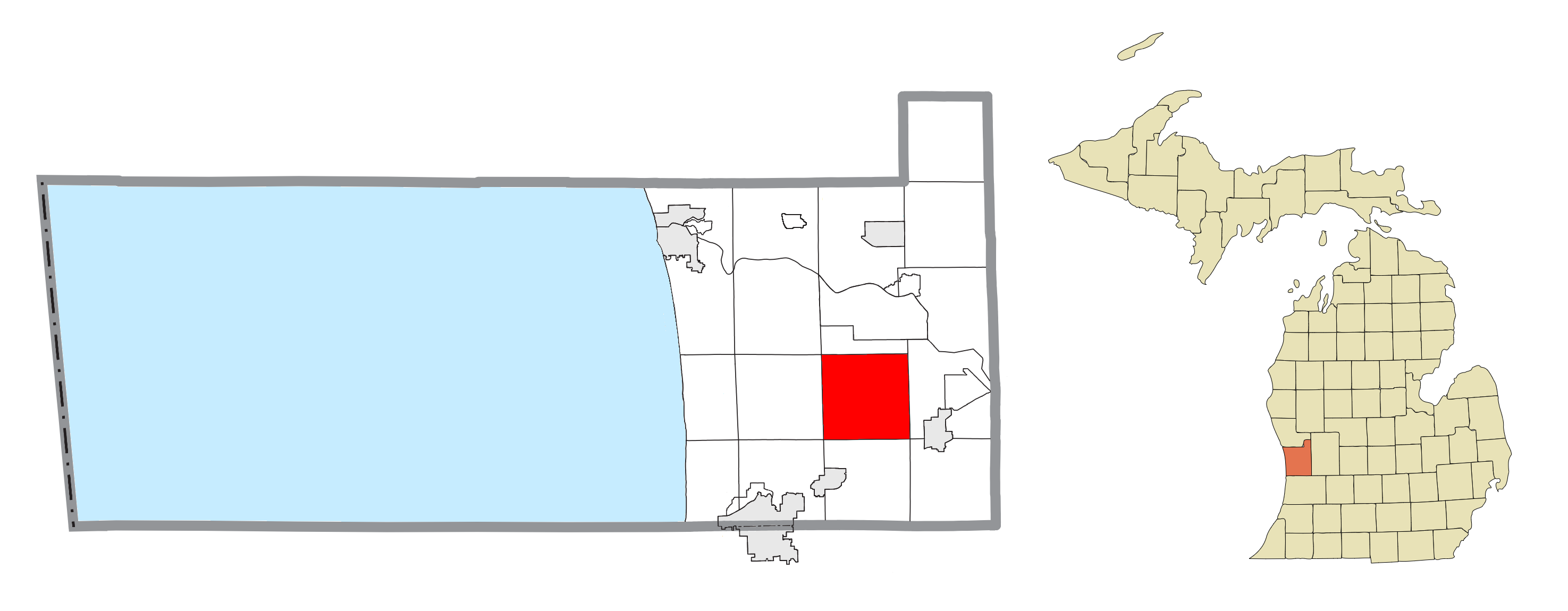
- Location within Ottawa County

- Location within the state of Michigan Location within the United States
- Coordinates: 42°54′13″N 85°57′05″W
- Country: United States
- State: Michigan
- County: Ottawa
- Established: 1854

Government
  - Supervisor: Donald Vander Kuyl
  - Clerk: Robin Overway

Area
  - Total: 36.37 sq mi (94.20 km^{2})
  - Land: 36.36 sq mi (94.17 km^{2})
  - Water: 0.012 sq mi (0.03 km^{2})
- Elevation: 643 ft (196 m)

Population (2020)
  - Total: 7,081
  - Density: 194.7/sq mi (75.2/km^{2})
- Time zone: UTC-5 (Eastern (EST))
  - Summer (DST): UTC-4 (EDT)
- ZIP code(s): 49401 (Allendale); 49426 (Hudsonville); 49464 (Zeeland)
- Area code: 616
- FIPS code: 26-08940
- GNIS feature ID: 1625946
- Website: Official website

Blendon Township is a civil township of Ottawa County in the U.S. state of Michigan. As of the 2020 census, the township population was 7,081.

== History ==
Blendon Township was formed in 1854. It was named for the Blendon Lumber Company, which owned much of the land in the township at the time.

== Communities ==
There are no incorporated municipalities within the township. There are settlements in the unincorporated communities of Blendon, North Blendon, Borculo (which lies on the western boundary with Olive Township) and Bauer (which lies on the eastern boundary with Georgetown Township).

- Bauer was established in 1880.
- Borculo was established in 1867 by Jackus Klamderman and named for it for his place of birth Borculo in the Netherlands. Most of the early settlers were Dutch.

== Geography ==
According to the United States Census Bureau, the township has a total area of 36.5 square miles (95 km^{2}), all land.

Olive Township is to the west, Robinson Township to the northwest, Allendale Charter Township to the north, Georgetown Township to the east, Jamestown Charter Township to the southeast, Zeeland Charter Township to the south, and Holland Charter Township to the southwest.

No major roads pass through the township, although Interstate 196 passes just south of the township. The city of Hudsonville is just southeast of the township, while the cities of Zeeland and Holland are just a short distance to the southwest. Grand Rapids is about 15 miles to the east and Grand Haven is 20 miles to the northwest.

== Demographics ==
Historical population
Census	Pop.	Note	%±
2000	5,721		—
2010	5,772		0.9%
2020	7,081		22.7%
U.S. Decennial Census

As of the census of 2000, there were 5,721 people, 1,743 households, and 1,492 families residing in the township. The population density was 156.6 inhabitants per square mile (60.5/km^{2}). There were 1,783 housing units at an average density of 48.8 per square mile (18.8/km^{2}). The racial makeup of the township was 97.82% White, 0.17% African American, 0.09% Native American, 0.42% Asian, 0.44% from other races, and 1.07% from two or more races. Hispanic or Latino of any race were 1.94% of the population.

There were 1,743 households, out of which 48.3% had children under the age of 18 living with them, 79.6% were married couples living together, 4.0% had a female householder with no husband present, and 14.4% were non-families. 11.0% of all households were made up of individuals, and 3.3% had someone living alone who was 65 years of age or older. The average household size was 3.28 and the average family size was 3.57.

In the township the population was spread out, with 33.1% under the age of 18, 11.8% from 18 to 24, 29.1% from 25 to 44, 20.4% from 45 to 64, and 5.7% who were 65 years of age or older. The median age was 31 years. For every 100 females, there were 103.2 males. For every 100 females age 18 and over, there were 105.9 males.

The median income for a household in the township was $56,094, and the median income for a family was $61,611. Males had a median income of $41,226 versus $31,000 for females. The per capita income for the township was $20,876. About 1.6% of families and 2.8% of the population were below the poverty line, including 1.5% of those under age 18 and 8.8% of those age 65 or over.

== Notable people ==
- John J. Pruis (Borculo, MI) American academic, best known as being a president of Ball State University
