= Blendon Township =

Blendon Township may refer to:

- Blendon Township, Michigan
- Blendon Township, Ohio
