= Donald Tabron II =

American football player

Cass Tech Technicians
- Position: Quarterback
- Class: Junior

Personal information
- Listed height: 6 ft 4 in (1.93 m)
- Listed weight: 190 lb (86 kg)

Career information
- High school: Cass Tech (Detroit, Michigan)

Donald Tabron II is an American football quarterback for the Cass Tech Technicians.

== Early life ==
Tabron II attends Cass Technical High School in Detroit, Michigan. As a freshman, he threw for 1,656 yards and 17 touchdowns and won the Michigan High School Athletic Association (MHSAA) Division 1 state championship over Hudsonville. In week 8 of his sophomore season, Tabron II threw for 340 yards and set an MHSAA record with a 99-yard touchdown pass in a win over Detroit Martin Luther King. He threw for 2,800 yards and 35 touchdowns on the season, losing in the state championship to Detroit Catholic Central. Heading into his junior season, Tabron II was voted the Buffalo Wild Wings Preseason Football Player of the Year.

=== Recruiting ===
Tabron II was rated as a five-star recruit by 247Sports, receiving offers from schools such as Alabama, LSU, Miami, Michigan, Michigan State, Ohio State, Oregon, and Penn State.
