= Kyle Clement =

American football player (born 1985)

No. 67
- Position: Defensive tackle

Personal information
- Born: April 10, 1985 (age 41); Hudsonville, Michigan, U.S.
- Listed height: 6 ft 3 in (1.91 m)
- Listed weight: 315 lb (143 kg)

Career information
- High school: Hudsonville
- College: Northwood
- NFL draft: 2008: undrafted

Career history
- Pittsburgh Steelers (2008)

Awards and highlights
- Super Bowl champion (XLIII); 3× All-GLIAC (2005–2007)

Kyle Clement (born April 10, 1985) is an American former professional football player who was a defensive tackle in the National Football League (NFL). He played college football for the Northwood Timberwolves. Clement was signed by the Pittsburgh Steelers as an undrafted free agent in 2008. He helped the Steelers win the Vince Lombardi Trophy in Super Bowl XLIII.

== Early life ==
Clement attended Hudsonville High School, in Hudsonville, Michigan.

== College career ==
He played college football at Northwood University in Midland, Michigan, where he was a four-year starter and a standout defensive lineman. He was twice named first-team all conference in the GLIAC, and was selected to participate in the Cactus Bowl after his senior season.

== Professional career ==
=== Pittsburgh Steelers ===
Clement was signed to a 2-year deal by the Pittsburgh Steelers as an undrafted free agent following his college career. During training camp, Clement suffered a knee injury that required microfracture surgery. He was placed on injured reserve for the remainder of the 2008 season.

Clement was a member of the Super Bowl XLIII Champion Pittsburgh Steelers.
