= John Vander Wal =

American baseball player & coach (born 1966)

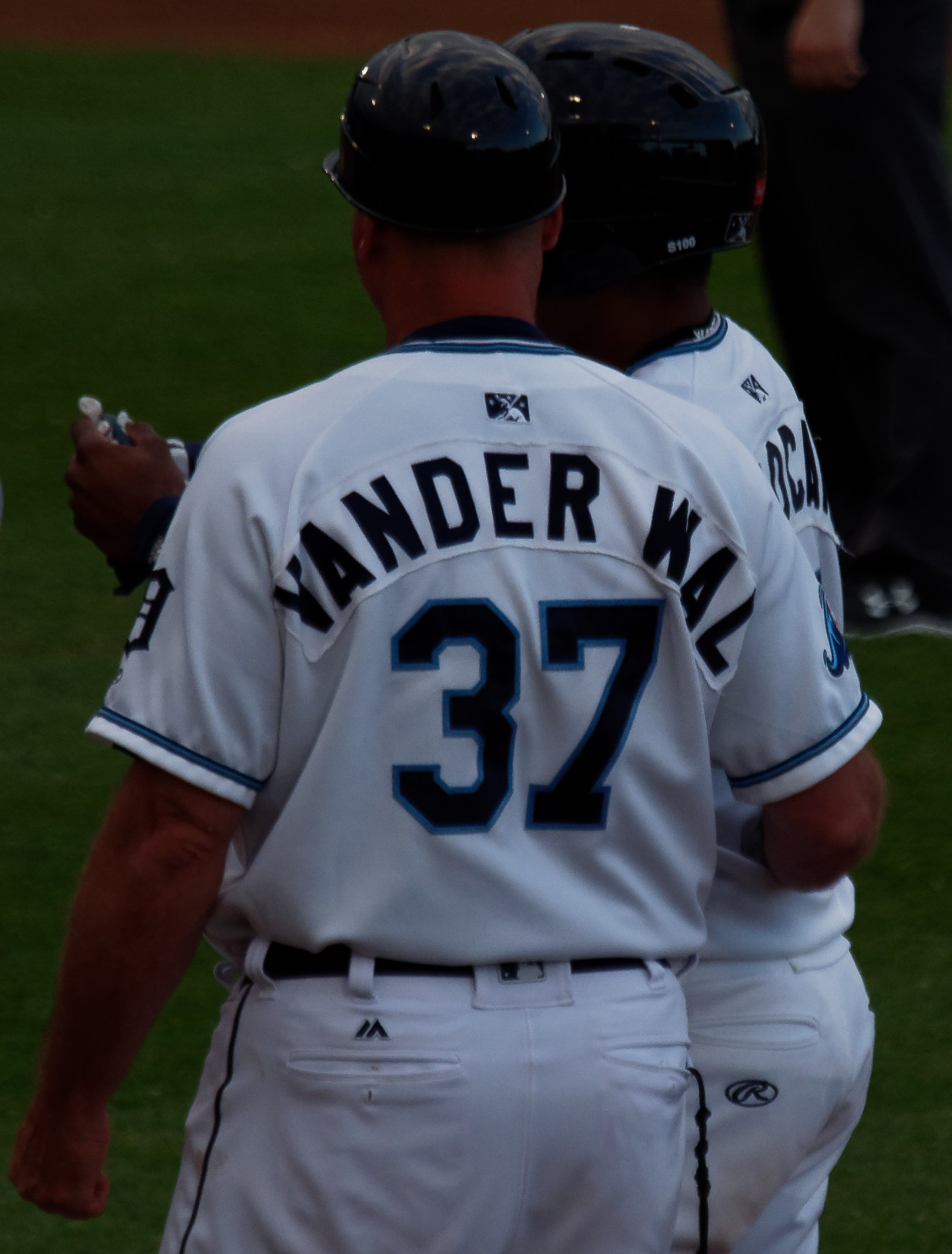
- Vander Wal as manager of the West Michigan Whitecaps in 2018
- Outfielder / First baseman
- Born: April 29, 1966 (age 60); Grand Rapids, Michigan, U.S.
- Batted: Left Threw: Left

MLB debut
- September 6, 1991, for the Montreal Expos

Last MLB appearance
- September 27, 2004, for the Cincinnati Reds

MLB statistics
- Batting average: .261
- Home runs: 97
- Runs batted in: 430
- Stats at Baseball Reference

Teams
- Montreal Expos (1991–1993); Colorado Rockies (1994–1998); San Diego Padres (1998–1999); Pittsburgh Pirates (2000–2001); San Francisco Giants (2001); New York Yankees (2002); Milwaukee Brewers (2003); Cincinnati Reds (2004)

John Henry Vander Wal (born April 29, 1966) is an American former Major League Baseball left-handed hitter who played outfield and first base for eight different teams over 14 seasons.

== Early life ==
Vander Wal grew up in Hudsonville, Michigan and graduated from Hudsonville High School in Hudsonville. He was drafted in the 8th round of the 1984 Major League Baseball draft by the Houston Astros. He did not sign with Houston, and instead attended Western Michigan University. He was drafted by the Montreal Expos in the third round of the 1987 Major League Baseball draft.

== Major league career ==
Vander Wal made his major league debut with the Expos on September 6, 1991, and finished his first season with 13 hits in 61 at-bats for a .213 batting average.

Vander Wal played two more seasons in Montreal before moving on to the Colorado Rockies in 1994, where he would spend all of four seasons and part of another, although he never recorded more than 151 at-bats or appeared in 105 games in any of those seasons. On August 31, 1998, he was traded to the San Diego Padres for a PTBNL. He went on to appear in the World Series with the Padres, recording two hits in five at-bats.

Vander Wal spent 1999 in San Diego before moving on to the Pittsburgh Pirates in a 2000 trade that brought Al Martin to the Padres. While playing for the Pirates, he posted his best season, appearing in 134 games, and batting .299 with 24 home runs and 94 RBI. In 2001, Vander Wal was traded to the San Francisco Giants, who later traded him to the New York Yankees for Jay Witasick. Vander Wal was a part-time performer for the Yankees in 2002, before moving on to the Milwaukee Brewers in 2003, and the Cincinnati Reds in 2004, where he recorded just 6 hits in 51 at-bats for a .118 average.

Vander Wal played 14 seasons in the major leagues. 13 of these seasons were with National League clubs, where the pinch hitter was a much more widely used tactic prior to adoption of the designated hitter.

In 1372 games over 14 seasons, Vander Wal posted a .261 batting average (717-for-2751) with 374 runs, 170 doubles, 18 triples, 97 home runs, 430 RBI, 38 stolen bases, 385 bases on balls, .351 on-base percentage and .441 slugging percentage. He finished his career with a .987 fielding percentage playing at right and left field and first base. In 16 postseason games, he hit .286 (6-for-21) with 2 runs, 1 double, 1 triple, 1 home run and 4 RBI.

On February 10, 2009, Vander Wal was named a scout for the San Diego Padres and held that position until 2016.

== Achievements ==
Vander Wal holds the modern Major League Baseball single-season record for pinch hits, with 28 in 1995 while playing for the Colorado Rockies. In 2017, Ichiro Suzuki almost equaled Vander Wal's record, but finished with 27 pinch-hits. In his career, Vander Wal contributed 129 pinch hits, which is one of the highest totals of the modern era, behind Lenny Harris' 212.

Vander Wal was inducted into the Western Michigan University Athletic Hall of Fame in 2003.
