= On a Sunbeam =

Science fiction webcomic and graphic novel

On A Sunbeam
- Book cover
- Author: Tillie Walden
- Website: www.onasunbeam.com
- Current status/schedule: finished
- Launch date: Fall 2016
- End date: Spring 2017
- Genre: Science fiction

On a Sunbeam is a science fiction webcomic, later released as a graphic novel, by American cartoonist Tillie Walden. Set in a spacefaring science fiction world, the plot follows the development of the protagonist Mia, who joins the crew of the maintenance ship Aktis and attempts to reconnect with a lost love. It was nominated for the 2017 Eisner Award for Best Digital Comic and the graphic novel won the 2018 Los Angeles Times Book Prize.

== Plot ==
The story is set in outer space that has been colonized by humanity via fish-like spaceships. In addition to other planets, mankind has colonized island-like asteroids and constructed moving, foundation-less buildings.

The story is told non-linearly; a series of flashbacks relating to the protagonist, Mia, are presented concurrently with present events.

Five Years Ago:

A freshman at Cleary's School for Girls, Mia is rebellious and apathetic about her studies, which prove to alienate her from her classmates. Mia is passionate about Lux, a school sport that sees students build and pilot hovercraft to obtain orbs known as "planets", and hopes to become a Lux pilot someday. To this end, she sneaks into the Lux gym during a school assembly, but is caught and sent to the principal's office for trespassing.

There, she meets Grace Hill, a creative but shy new kid. The two girls become friends, getting closer after Mia fights a group of bullies to retrieve Grace's prized necklace that was stolen from her, and eventually fall in love.

Mid-school year, Grace is requested home by her enigmatic family. She reveals to Mia that she hails from The Staircase, a floating archipelago located on the far reaches of the cosmos. The Staircase is not easily inhabited due to violent storms that threaten to erode the surface, but is also home to fantastical wildlife, hot springs and so-called "healing rock". A long time ago, the Hill family colonized The Staircase, and proceeded to go to war in its defense against outside forces hoping to use the natural resources for themselves. In the aftermath, a mutual agreement illegalized passage through The Staircase's border. Grace was delivered to Cleary, despite protests from her family, thanks to Alma and Charlotte (nicknamed "Char"), a married couple and the crew of the ship Aktis, who illegally help those stranded on The Staircase cross the border. Now, rock formations on The Staircase's exterior are forecasted to shift, blocking the only path to the interior, and the Hills want Grace to return immediately, or else risk never seeing her again.

The Hills send Grace's sisters to retrieve her; they arrive at night and plan on departing the next morning. That morning, as Mia makes her way from her dormitory to Grace's suite, she is kidnapped and imprisoned in a closet by her bullies, seeking revenge for the fight. Mia manages to escape, but finds that Grace and her family have already departed.

The Present:

By now, Mia has become more responsible and emotionally reserved. Having graduated high schools with a poor academic record, she has few prospects and thus accepts a position on the Aktis, which has been reformed and now travels throughout the galaxy, restoring buildings scheduled for recycling. In addition to Alma and Char, the crew consists of Jules, Alma's rambunctious niece, and Elliot, a non-binary, non-verbal technician. On her first construction assignment, Mia's recklessness results in a near-fatal foundational collapse. Char reports the incident and is suspended for negligent supervision. During their subsequent period of sadness, Jules reveals that Elliot is a refugee from The Staircase, who was rescued by Alma and Char in their days as criminals. This prompts Mia to ask Elliot and the others for help infiltrating The Staircase, so she can reconnect with Grace and finally give their relationship a proper ending. The others accept and pledge to accompany Mia on her mission. They stop at Alma and Char's residence on an extraterrestrial planet to reunite with Char and plan their quest, before setting off to The Staircase.

Immediately after arriving at The Staircase's surface, things don't go as planned. The crew finds the Hills' surface-level house deserted, reasoning that the worsening storms must have necessitated a mass exodus to The Staircase's naturally occurring caverns. They descend to find an underground city and are intercepted by a patrol squadron, causing them to split up:

- Alma and Char are captured and imprisoned by the patrol and end up meeting the Hills' matriarch.
- Jules stumbles deeper underground and meets a Tessian Fox, a ghost-like creature native to The Staircase and considered a spiritual symbol by the native human population. The Fox reveals that the mist surrounding it is toxic to humans, and Jules is poisoned. With the Fox's cub's help, she's able to make it to Alma before losing consciousness, at which point Alma is released and returns to the Aktis to treat her.
- Elliot and Mia split up. Elliot reconnects with an old friend, and their backstory is revealed: they were once an apprentice to a cartographer named Sid. After a Tessian Fox killed Sid, Elliot retaliated and killed the Fox, an act of blasphemy. Elliot was branded a fugitive and secured passage on the Aktis to escape persecution. Elliot goes to a memorial for Sid, and is spotted and wounded by policewomen. Elliot flees, helping Char escape her imprisonment before heading for the Aktis.
- Mia makes her way into the city and spots one of Grace's sisters, convincing her to let her see Grace. They go to the Hills' underground manor, where Grace works as a playwright. Mia and Grace reconnect, with Mia apologizing for not saying goodbye when she had the chance and offering Grace a place on the crew of the Aktis. Though initially hesitant, Grace accepts, and the two make it back to the ship just in time before it is forced to depart The Staircase.

An unspecified time later, Jules and Elliot have fully recovered from their respective injuries. Alma and Char decide to settle down at their residence, and appoint Mia the new captain of the Aktis. The new crew sets off to repair more buildings and explore the galaxy.

== Characters ==
- Mia - Story's protagonist. She joins a group of maintenance workers in outer space aboard a spaceship that looks like a fish named the Aktis, reflecting on what brought her there, including a past relationship in boarding school with another girl named Grace. She has two mothers, like most characters in this webcomic.
- Elliot ("Ell") - The mechanic aboard the Aktis, who is non-binary. Jo is later criticized for using the wrong pronouns for them. They communicate non-verbally with the crew.
- Jo - A temporary supervisor of the Aktis crew after Char gets suspended, who uses the wrong pronouns for Ell in one part of the comic.
- Alma and Char - Two female, and married, crew members on the Aktis. Char is the captain.
- Julia ("Jules") - A crew member on the Aktis who is, like Ell, about the same age as Mia. Alma's niece.
- Grace - Mia's girlfriend at boarding school who hails from The Staircase, an off-limits region of outer space.

== Books ==
The webcomic was adapted into a graphic novel that was released in October 2018 by First Second Books, with the UK edition published by Avery Hill Publishing.

== Reception ==
Reviews for the webcomic were positive. Andrew Liptak of The Verge said that the comic is fantastic and "has a ton of potential." Rowan Hisayo Buchanan of The Atlantic noted that the resistance to viewing profit as an "ultimate goal" goes beyond the story itself to the way it was made, with the whole comic still "online even after the book deal," meaning it is "simultaneously free and available for purchase."

When the comic was published in a graphic novel format, reviews were just as positive. Reviewers for New York Public Library and CBR praised the colorful illustration, mixing of science fiction and fantasy genres, and queer characters, especially the queer romance between Mia and Grace. Andrea Crow of Lambda Literary and Zora Gilbert of Women Write About Comics further called the story captivating and beautiful, praising the illustrations. However, Crow specifically pointed to the focus on environmentalism and engagement with genderqueer identities, while Gilbert said the comic refuses to acknowledge the existence of masculinity, while crititicizing the comic for "homogeneity in body type." Others, like Stephanie Burt of The New Yorker, Caitlin Rosberg of The A.V. Club, Josh Kramer of The Comics Journal, praised the comic for being an optimistic, "queer coming-of-age story," world-building, imaginative setting, and storytelling. On the other hand, Lee Mandelo of Tor.com called the comic unremarkably queer, tender, and heartwarming, while Rowan Hisayo Buchanan of 'The Atlantic described it as a "science-fiction universe of queer love, crumbling ruins, and magical forests." At the same time, NPR praised the comic for its "interwoven timelines and stunning art" and Publishers Weekly called it a "sprawling, wonderfully original space jaunt" and a mix of sci-fi mixed with adventure, road trip, and school drama.
