= Grandville Public Schools =

School district in Michigan, United States

Address
- 3839 Prairie Street SW Grandville, Kent, Michigan, 49418; United States

District information
- Superintendent: Roger Bearup
- Schools: 10
- Budget: US$112,586,000 (2022-23 expenditures)
- NCES District ID: 2616470

Students and staff
- Students: 5,547 (2024-25)
- Teachers: 322.26 FTE (2024-25)
- Staff: 748.46 FTE (2024-25)
- Student–teacher ratio: 17.21 (2024-25)

Other information
- Website: www.gpsbulldogs.org

Grandville Public Schools is a public school district near Grand Rapids, Michigan. In Kent County it includes almost all of Grandville and parts of Walker and Wyoming, and small parts of Grand Rapids and Byron Township. In Ottawa County it includes portions of Georgetown Township, Jamestown Charter Township, and Tallmadge Township.

== History ==
Oakestown Intermediate School opened as Grandville High School in fall 1964. The present Grandville High School opened in 1997.

== Robotics competition facility ==
As part of the middle school construction project completed in 2023, a 60,000 square foot robotics competition arena was built. The facility has specialized fire suppression and electrical infrastructure to accommodate robotics competitions.

== Schools ==
List of Schools in Grandville Public Schools District
School	Address	Notes
Elementary Schools
Central Elementary	4052 Prairie St SW, Grandville	Grades K-4
Century Park Learning Center	5710 Kenowa Ave SW, Grandville	Grades K-4
Cummings Elementary	4261 Schoolcraft St. SW, Grand Rapids	Grades K-4
East Elementary	3413 30th St. SW, Grandville	Grades K-4
Grand View Elementary	3701 52nd St. SW, Wyoming	Grades K-4
South Elementary	3650 Navaho St. SW, Grandville	Grades K-4
West Elementary	3777 Aaron Ave. SW, Grandville	Grades K-4
Intermediate School
Oakestown Intermediate	3535 Wilson Ave. SW, Grandville	Formerly Grandville Middle School, reopened as a grades 5-6 building in fall 2024.
Middle School
Grandville Middle School	4900 Canal Ave. SW, Grandville	Grades 7-8. Opened fall 2023.
High School
Grandville High School	4700 Canal Ave. SW, Grandville	Grades 9-12. Opened fall 1997.
Other Facilities
Grandville Education Center		Houses Early Learning Center and Pathways program.

== See also ==
- List of school districts in Michigan
