= Zeeland Charter Township, Michigan =

Zeeland Township, Michigan
- Charter township
- Zeeland Charter Township
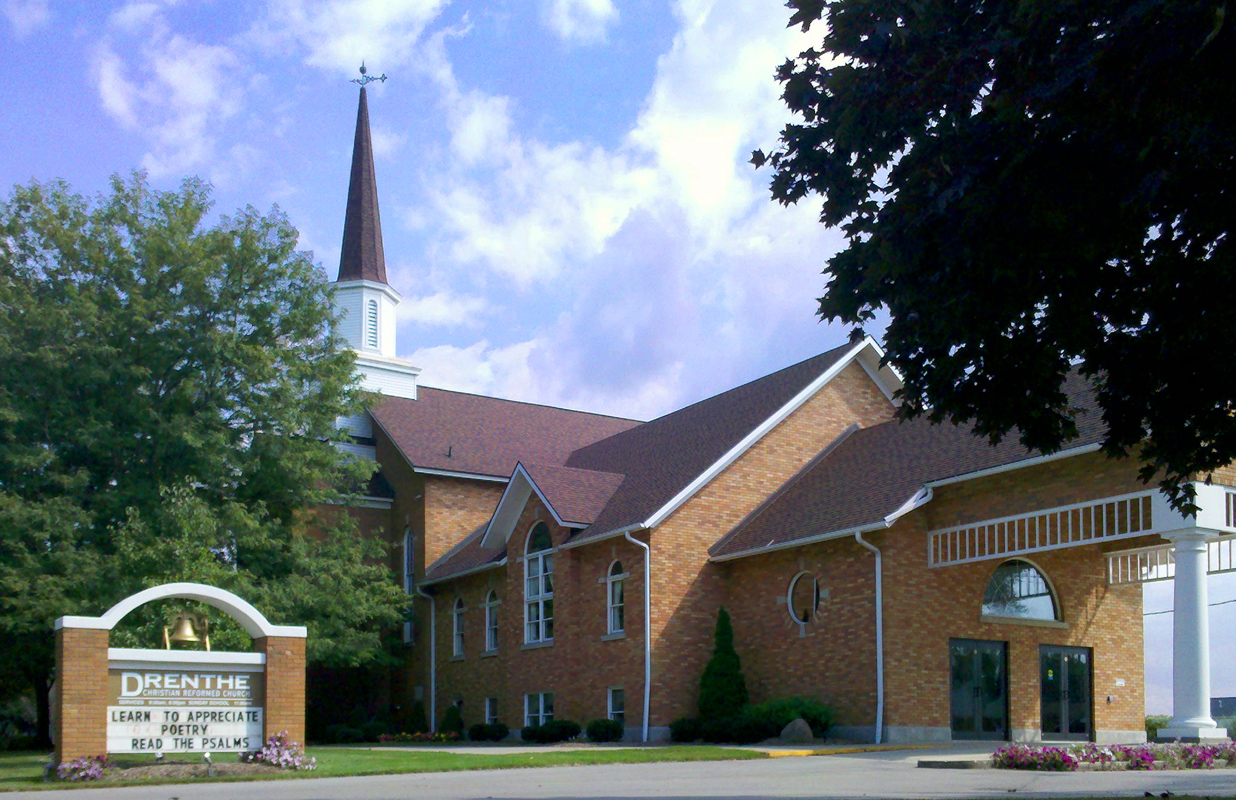
- Drenthe Christian Reformed Church

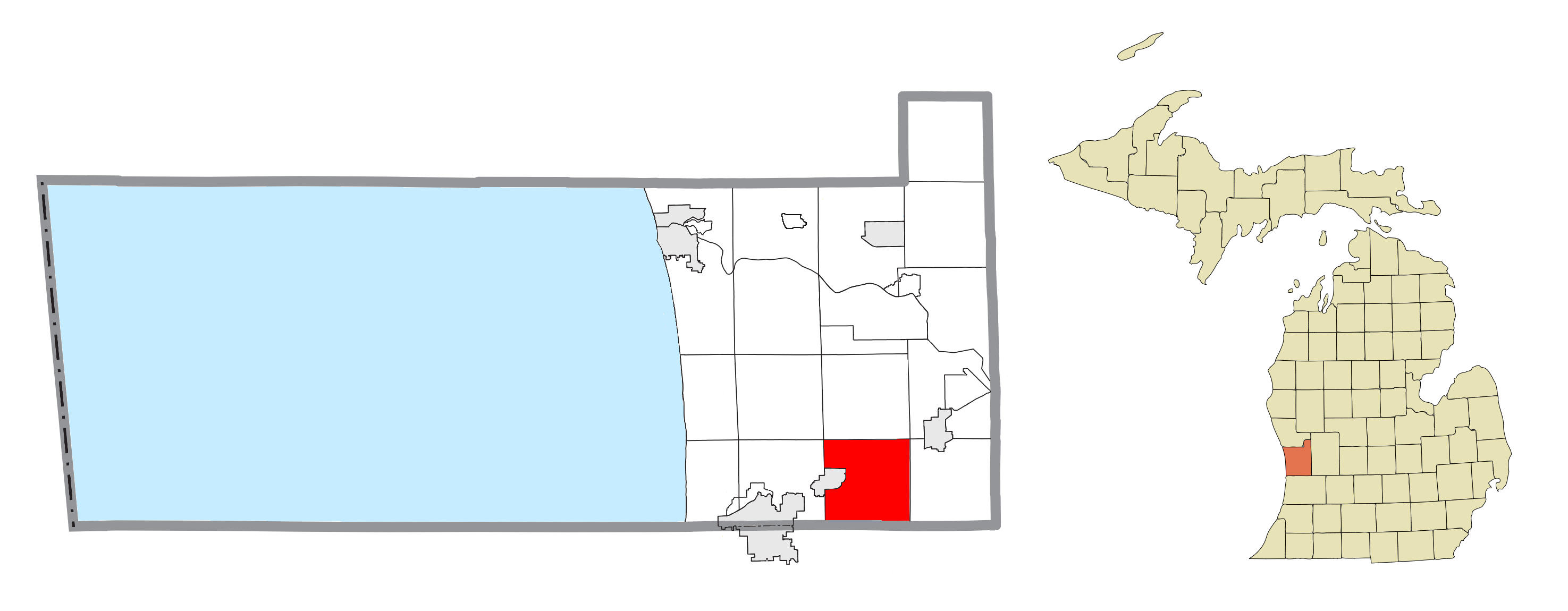
- Location within Ottawa County

- Location within the state of Michigan Location within the United States
- Coordinates: 42°48′55″N 85°57′17″W
- Country: United States
- State: Michigan
- County: Ottawa
- Settled: 1847

Government
  - Supervisor: Thomas Oonk
  - Clerk: Kate Kraak

Area
  - Total: 34.46 sq mi (89.25 km^{2})
  - Land: 34.40 sq mi (89.10 km^{2})
  - Water: 0.062 sq mi (0.16 km^{2})
- Elevation: 653 ft (199 m)

Population (2020)
  - Total: 12,008
  - Density: 349.1/sq mi (134.8/km^{2})
- Time zone: UTC-5 (Eastern (EST))
  - Summer (DST): UTC-4 (EDT)
- ZIP code(s): 49423 (Holland); 49426 (Hudsonville); 49464 (Zeeland)
- Area code: 616
- FIPS code: 26-89280
- GNIS feature ID: 1627303
- Website: Official website

Zeeland Charter Township is a charter township of Ottawa County in the U.S. state of Michigan. The population was 12,008 at the 2020 census.

== Communities ==
- The city of Zeeland is located at the western edge of the township and is administratively autonomous.
- Drenthe is an unincorporated community in the southeast part of the township at 42°46′58″N 85°56′24″W. It was named for the province of Drenthe in the Netherlands, and is primarily an agricultural community. It was founded in 1847 and had a post office from 1877 until 1907.
- Vriesland is an unincorporated community in the township at 42°48′43″N 85°56′25″W. It was named for the province of Friesland in the Netherlands.

== Geography ==
According to the United States Census Bureau, the township has a total area of 34.5 square miles (89 km^{2}), of which 34.4 square miles (89 km^{2}) is land and 0.04 square miles (0.10 km^{2}) (0.06%) is water.

== Demographics ==
As of the census of 2000, there were 7,613 people, 2,523 households, and 2,089 families residing in the township. The population density was 221.1 inhabitants per square mile (85.4/km^{2}). There were 2,604 housing units at an average density of 75.6 per square mile (29.2/km^{2}). The racial makeup of the township was 91.87% White, 0.62% African American, 0.38% Native American, 1.81% Asian, 3.80% from other races, and 1.52% from two or more races. Hispanic or Latino of any race were 6.32% of the population.

There were 2,523 households, out of which 47.5% had children under the age of 18 living with them, 70.6% were married couples living together, 8.7% had a female householder with no husband present, and 17.2% were non-families. 13.6% of all households were made up of individuals, and 3.4% had someone living alone who was 65 years of age or older. The average household size was 3.02 and the average family size was 3.33.

In the township the population was spread out, with 34.2% under the age of 18, 8.2% from 18 to 24, 31.5% from 25 to 44, 18.9% from 45 to 64, and 7.2% who were 65 years of age or older. The median age was 31 years. For every 100 females, there were 99.1 males. For every 100 females age 18 and over, there were 96.2 males.

The median income for a household in the township was $52,079, and the median income for a family was $57,423. Males had a median income of $41,522 versus $26,283 for females. The per capita income for the township was $19,295. About 5.5% of families and 6.3% of the population were below the poverty line, including 8.1% of those under age 18 and 10.9% of those age 65 or over.

== Transportation ==
The township is home to Ottawa Executive Airport, a privately owned airport used for general aviation.
