= Maia Kobabe =

American cartoonist (born 1989)

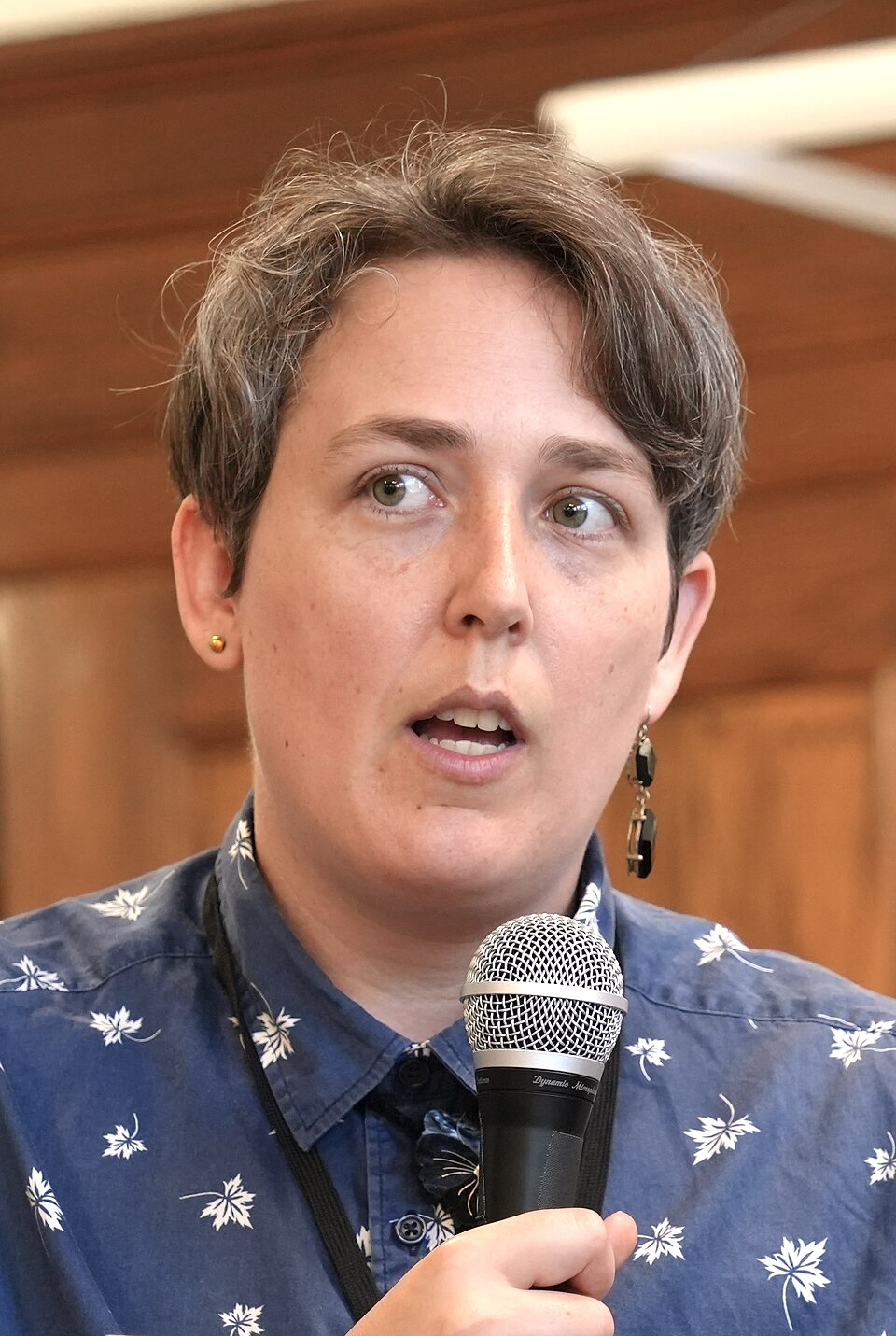
- Kobabe at Bay Area Book Festival 2025
- Born: 1989 (age 36–37)
- Areas: Cartoonist, Writer
- Notable works: Gender Queer: A Memoir
- Awards: Alex Awards (2020); Stonewall Book Awards (2020)

Maia Kobabe (/koʊˈbeɪb/ koh-BAYB; born 1989) is an American cartoonist and the author of Gender Queer: A Memoir (2019), an autobiographical graphic novel recounting Kobabe's life as a person who would ultimately identify as non-binary. Kobabe's works primarily revolve around themes of identity, sexuality, anti-fascism, fairy tales, and homesickness.

== Education ==
Kobabe was one of the first students enrolled in the Master of Fine Arts in Comics program at California College of the Arts, and graduated in 2015.

== Career ==
Kobabe's graphic nonfiction work has been featured in The Nib, The Press Democrat, and SF Weekly, among other publications.

Kobabe's first full-length book Gender Queer: A Memoir was published by Lion Forge Comics in 2019. When asked in a Time magazine interview why Kobabe wrote the book, Kobabe said:

I wrote this book in huge part because I was struggling to come out, and I was asking myself all these questions and I was having these somewhat challenging conversations. And it often seems like I was never able to fully get my point across. And I got to the point where I thought, 'I have to sit down and write about this because I don’t feel like I am getting across verbally what I’m really trying to say.'

Gender Queer was made available in some school libraries but was subsequently banned by a school district in Alaska, due to its sexually explicit content. Kobabe responded to the controversy with an opinion piece in The Washington Post, suggesting that accusers were upset less by the sexually explicit images and language than by the LGBTQ themes of the book. Gender Queer was listed as one of the most banned or challenged books in September 2021 by The American Library Association's Office of Intellectual Freedom (OIF). According to a report (September 2022) from PEN America, Kobabe was the second most banned author in US school districts during the 2021–22 school year, with Gender Queer the most frequently challenged book, banned in 41 school districts. Discussing a wave of book censorship in early 2022 within the United States in a Slate interview, Kobabe said:

What I'm learning is that a book challenge is like a community attacking itself. The people who are hurt in a challenge are the marginalized readers in the community where the challenge takes place. That is readers who are younger, readers who do not have the financial means to buy books if they're not available for free in the library. That is queer teens who might not feel comfortable bringing a book with such an obvious title into their home, if they have more conservative parents who would only feel safe reading the book secretly in the library without even checking it out. So yes, it upsets me because what I'm seeing is resources being taken away from queer marginalized youth, which does hurt. That does hurt me.

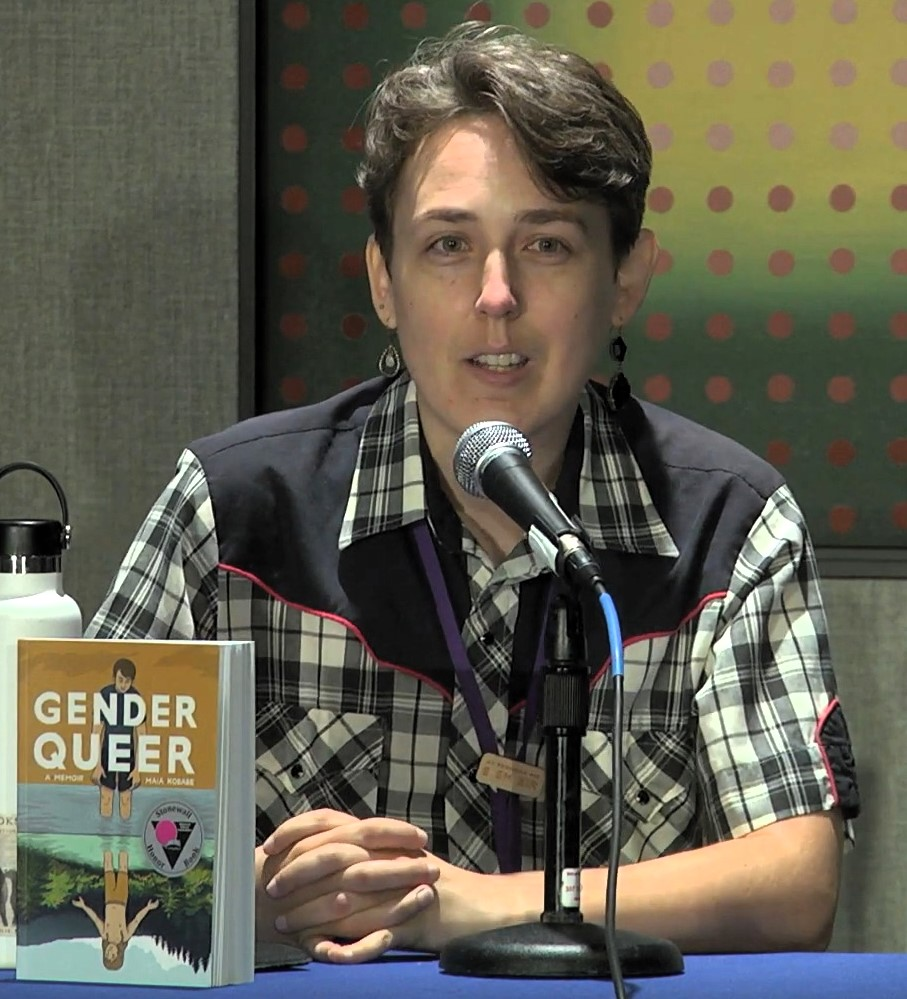
Kobabe at Small Press Expo 2023

In January 2023, Scholastic acquired a middle-grade graphic novel by Kobabe and Lucky Srikumar "in a six-figure auction". The novel, titled Opting Out, was published by Scholastic's imprint Graphix on May 5, 2026.

In collaboration with University of Michigan professor Dr. Sarah Peitzmeier, Kobabe created Breathe: Journeys to Healthy Binding, an educational graphic novel about binding. Originally a 32-page digital zine, it received a 64-page print release through Dutton Books in May 2024.

== Personal life ==
Kobabe uses Spivak pronouns (e/em/eir) and is non-binary and asexual. Kobabe is dyslexic and did not learn to read until age 11.

== Bibliography ==
- Kobabe, Maia (May 31, 2019). Gender Queer. Portland, Oregon: Lion Forge Comics. ISBN 9781549304002.
- McCullough, Joy (February 9, 2021). We Are The Ashes, We Are The Fire. Illustrated by Maia Kobabe. Dutton Books for Young Readers. ISBN 978-0525556053.
- Kobabe, Maia; Peitzmeier, Sarah (May 7, 2024). Breathe: Journeys to Healthy Binding. Dutton Books.
- Kobabe, Maia (May 19, 2026). Gender Queer: The Annotated Edition. Oni Press. ISBN 979-8894880822.
- Kobabe, Maia; Srikumar, Lucky (May 5, 2026). Opting Out. Graphix. ISBN 978-1546110125.

=== Anthologies ===
Kobabe has published short comics in the following anthologies:

- Alphabet (Stacked Deck Press, 2016)
- Tabula Idem: A Queer Tarot Comic Anthology (Fortuna Media, 2017)
- The Secret Loves of Geeks (Dark Horse Comics, 2018)
- Gothic Tales of Haunted Love (Bedside Press, 2018)
- Mine!: A Celebration of Liberty And Freedom For All Benefiting Planned Parenthood (ComicMix, 2018)
- Faster Than Light, Y’all (Iron Circus Comics, 2018)
- Advanced Death Saves (Lost His Keys Man Comics, 2019)
- How to Wait: An Anthology of Transition (edited by Sage Persing, 2019)
- Theater of Terror: Revenge of the Queers (Northwest Press, 2019)
- Rolled and Told Vol. 2 (Oni Press, 2020)
- Be Gay, Do Comics (IDW Publishing, 2020)

== Awards ==
- 2016 Ignatz Award — Promising New Talent Nominee (Tom O’Bedlam)
- 2019 Ignatz Award Outstanding Graphic Novel Nominee (Gender Queer: A Memoir)
- 2019 YALSA Great Graphic Novels for Teens Nominee (Gender Queer: A Memoir)
- 2020 American Library Association Alex Award Winner (Gender Queer: A Memoir)
- 2020 Stonewall Book Awards — Israel Fishman Non-Fiction Honor Book (Gender Queer: A Memoir)
