= Tillie Walden =

American cartoonist and author

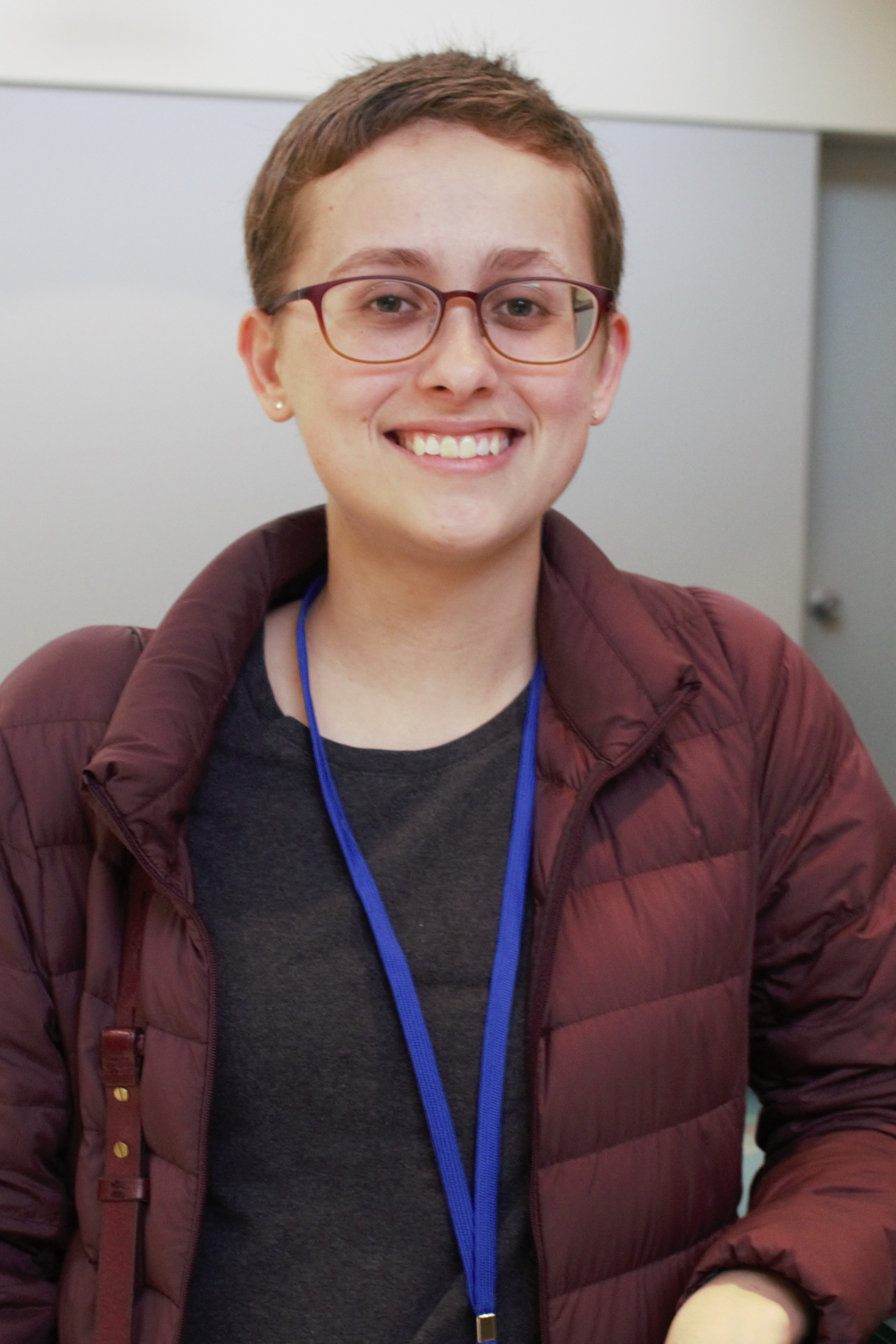
- Walden in 2018
- Born: 1996 (age 29–30)
- Education: Center for Cartoon Studies
- Occupations: Cartoonist, author
- Writing career
- Genre: Graphic novel
- Notable works: Spinning; On a Sunbeam
- Notable awards: Eisner Award 2018 Best Reality-Based Work – Spinning; Eisner Award 2020 Best Graphic Album-New – Are You Listening?; Ignatz Award 2016 Outstanding artist – The End of Summer; Ignatz Award 2016 Promising new talent – I Love This Part l
- Website: tilliewalden.com

Tillie Walden (born 1996) is an American cartoonist who has published several graphic novels and a webcomic. Walden won the 2018 Eisner Award for Best Reality-Based Work for her graphic novel Spinning, making her one of the youngest Eisner Award winners ever. She was named Vermont's cartoonist laureate for 2023-2026, making her the state's youngest-ever cartoonist laureate.

== Early life ==
Walden grew up in New Jersey and Austin, Texas. She was a competitive figure skater.

Walden is named after her paternal grandmother, an artist who died before Walden was born. Walden's first comic was a black-and-white comic "about never knowing her [grandmother] but following in her footsteps. A workshop led by Scott McCloud was a major turning point in her career; it "really inspired [her] to draw some comics, and around this time [she] was also becoming increasingly bored with fine art."

Growing up, Walden read a lot of manga, which had an influence on her work, in particular the art of Yoshihiro Togashi, Osamu Tezuka, and Rumiko Takahashi. Walden has also said, "Studio Ghibli has completely shaped my visual vocabulary and how I think about stories." Walden has also been influenced by graphic memoirs, such as Fun Home by Alison Bechdel, Blankets by Craig Thompson, and Stitches by David Small.

Walden began putting her comics and drawings on her website, and was discovered while still in high school by British publisher Avery Hill Publishing, who worked with Walden to publish her first graphic novel, The End of Summer.

== Career ==
Walden's debut graphic novel, The End of Summer, was published by Avery Hill in June 2015. It is told from the viewpoint of Lars, a feeble boy who lives in a fantastical palace and has a giant cat named Nemo. In an WORDS interview with Paul Gravett, she dedicates the book to her twin brother, John, describing the main characters as being a mishmash of her and John. Walden won the 2016 Ignatz Award for Outstanding Artist for The End of Summer.

Her second graphic novel, I Love This Part, was published by Avery Hill in November 2015 and tells the story of two teenage girls who fall in love. Walden won the 2016 Ignatz Award for Promising New Talent for I Love This Part. The novel was also nominated for the 2016 Eisner Award for Best Single Issue/One-Shot.

Walden's third graphic novel, A City Inside, was published by Avery Hill in 2016. It won the 2016 Broken Frontier Award for Best One-Shot.

Spinning, Walden's first graphic novel memoir about her years as a competitive ice skater, was published by First Second Books in September 2017. Originally, Spinning was Walden's thesis work for the Center for Cartoon Studies during her second year of schooling there. It won the 2018 Eisner Award for Best Reality-Based Work, making Walden one of the youngest Eisner Award winners ever at 22.

Walden's On a Sunbeam, a science fiction webcomic, was nominated for the 2017 Eisner Award for Best Digital Comic. The webcomic was adapted into a graphic novel that was released in October 2018 by First Second Books, with the UK edition published by Avery Hill Publishing. Set in space, the story revolves around a crew in charge of restoring old structures. As Mia, the newest member, gets to know her team, in the present timeline, a flashback occurs to her past at school, where she fell in love with another student named Grace. The graphic novel won the 2018 Los Angeles Times Book Prize.

To commemorate International Women's Day, Walden's piece "Minutes" was featured as a Google Doodle on March 8, 2018.

In 2019, Walden published Are You Listening? from First Second Books, which earned her the 2020 Eisner Award for Best Graphic Album-New.

In 2020, Walden published Alone in Space: A Collection, which compiled her previously published I Love This Part and A City Inside, as well as several previously unpublished comics, sketches, and works from magazines, including her piece What It's Like To Be Gay In An All-Girls Middle School.

In 2021, Walden was approached by Skybound to write a trilogy of graphic novels centering on Clementine from The Walking Dead. Clementine: Book One was released in 2022, Book Two in 2023, while Book Three was released in 2025.

In 2022, Walden and Emma Hunsinger published My Parents Won't Stop Talking! from First Second Books.

In 2023, Walden illustrated the graphic novel Junior High, written by Tegan and Sara. A sequel, Crush was published in 2024.

=== Charity and Sylvia graphic novel dispute ===
In May 2024, Walden took up residency at the Henry Sheldon Museum of Vermont History to write a graphic novel about the relationship between Sylvia Drake and Charity Bryant. The Sheldon Museum has many records from the couple, which Walden used to write the novel. The project was commissioned by Vermont Humanities and the Vermont branch of the National Endowment for the Humanities. The book was released in June 2026 from Drawn & Quarterly, entitled Charity and Sylvia. On June 29, 2026, historian Rachel Hope Cleves stated that while she appreciated Walden's graphic novel, Walden had not adequately acknowledged that the graphic novel was based upon her book with a similar name (Charity & Sylvia: A Same-Sex Marriage in Early America), and had adapted it "without credit or compensation", claiming Cleves' research "for her own". She said she was disappointed that Walden's media appearances will make her book "harder for readers to find, not easier, and diminish its ... enormously positive impact." She later told Comics Beat that she wanted Walden's publisher, Drawn & Quarterly, to give her the option for the adaptation and to "co-credit her, with appropriate compensation."

In a statement on July 2, Drawn & Quarterly defended Walden and her research, and noted that Walden had cited Cleves. Cleves responded that the graphic novel was an uncredited adaptation for which Walden and D&W should acknowledge, with appropriate compensation, rather than "profiting off eight years" of her labor. On July 20th, it was reported that historian Ellery Foutch and Coco Moseley of Henry Sheldon Museum, and the museum itself, supported Walden, as did the Vermont Humanities executive director, Christopher Kaufman Ilstrup. Foutch stated that she was surprised at Cleves' claims, described the two books as different, while Moseley stated that "historical understanding is cumulative. It rarely begins with a single researcher or ends with a single book." In contrast, author Alison Bechdel expressed sympathy for Cleves, telling Seven Days Vermont that Cleves was correct in saying that Walden's book would "supersede" her book, adding that the controversy was "as much a commentary on our postliterate era as anything else."

== Personal life ==
Walden has known she was a lesbian since she was 5. Before she came out, Walden avoided including queer characters in her stories, feeling that she "couldn't draw openly gay characters if [she] was still scared to be openly gay."

Walden has spoken of her father's influence on her entrance into the comics industry. As she said in an interview, "My dad has been the behind-the-scenes guy for my entire comics career. I realized that when I start looking, he's been everywhere."

Walden is a graduate of the Center for Cartoon Studies. She also works as a professor there.

She is married to fellow graphic novelist Emma Hunsinger, whom she met when they were both attending the Center for Cartoon Studies. On October 4, 2023, the same day as Clementine: Book Two was released, Walden gave birth to her and Hunsinger's first son, Walter. Walden has two cats named Stanley and Tatiana.

== Published works ==
- The End of Summer (Avery Hill Publishing 2015)
- I Love This Part (Avery Hill Publishing 2015)
- A City Inside (Avery Hill Publishing 2016)
- Spinning (First Second Books 2017)
- Mini Meditations on Creativity (Liminal 11, 2018)
- On a Sunbeam (First Second Books 2018)
- Are You Listening? (First Second Books 2020)
- Alone in Space (Avery Hill Publishing 2021)
- My Parents Won't Stop Talking! (First Second Books 2022)
- Clementine: Book One (Image Comics / Skybound Entertainment 2022)
- Junior High by Tegan Quin and Sara Quin (Farrar, Straus and Giroux 2023)
- Clementine: Book Two (Image / Skybound 2023)
- Crush by Tegan Quin & Sara Quin (Farrar, Straus and Giroux 2024)
- Clementine: Book Three (Image / Skybound 2025)
- Charity and Sylvia (Drawn & Quarterly, 2026)

== Awards ==
- Broken Frontier, 2016 – A City Inside
- Ignatz Award, 2016 –The End of Summer
- Ignatz Award, 2016, Outstanding Artist – The End of Summer
- Ignatz Award, 2016, Promising New Talent – I Love This Part
- Eisner Award, 2018, Best Reality-Based Work – Spinning
- Los Angeles Times Book Prize, 2018 – On A Sunbeam
- Eisner Award, 2020, Best Graphic Album-New – Are You Listening?
