= Georgetown Township, Michigan =

- Charter township
- Georgetown Charter Township
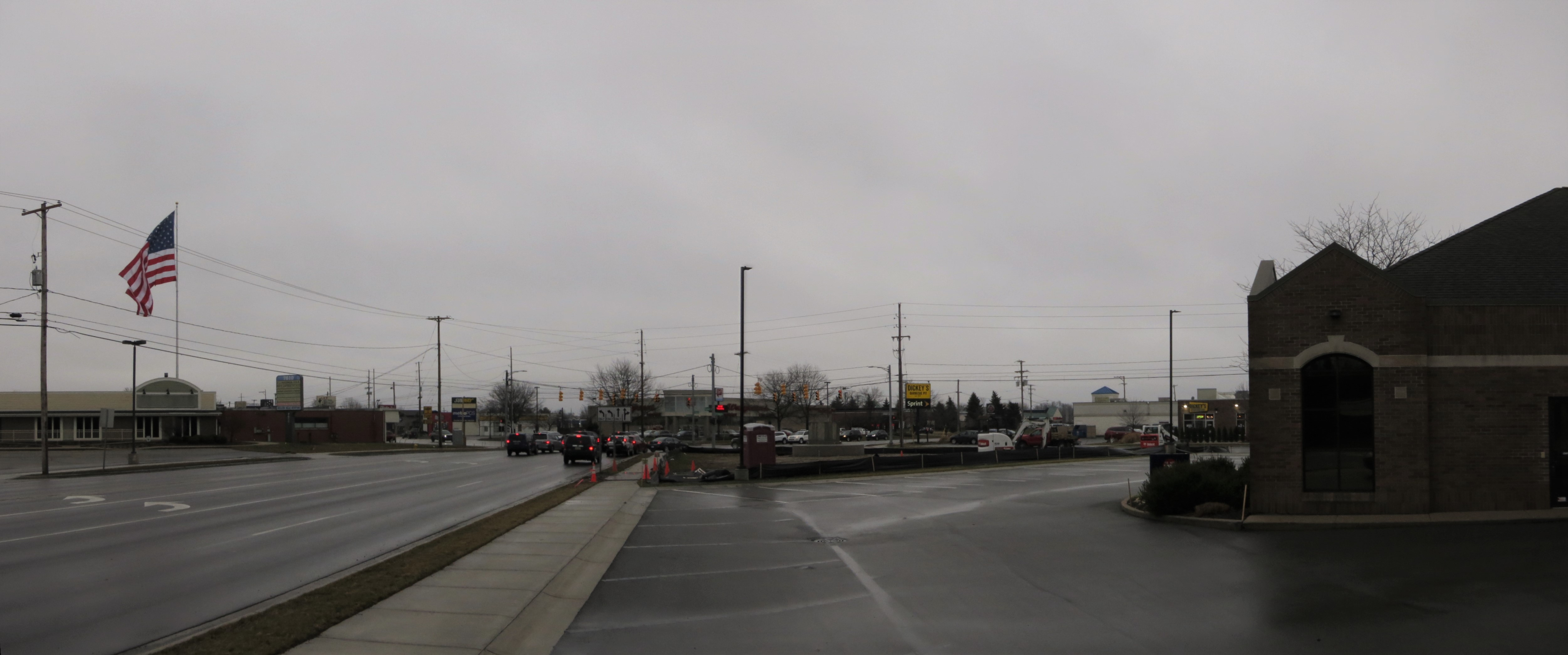
- Unincorporated community of Jenison

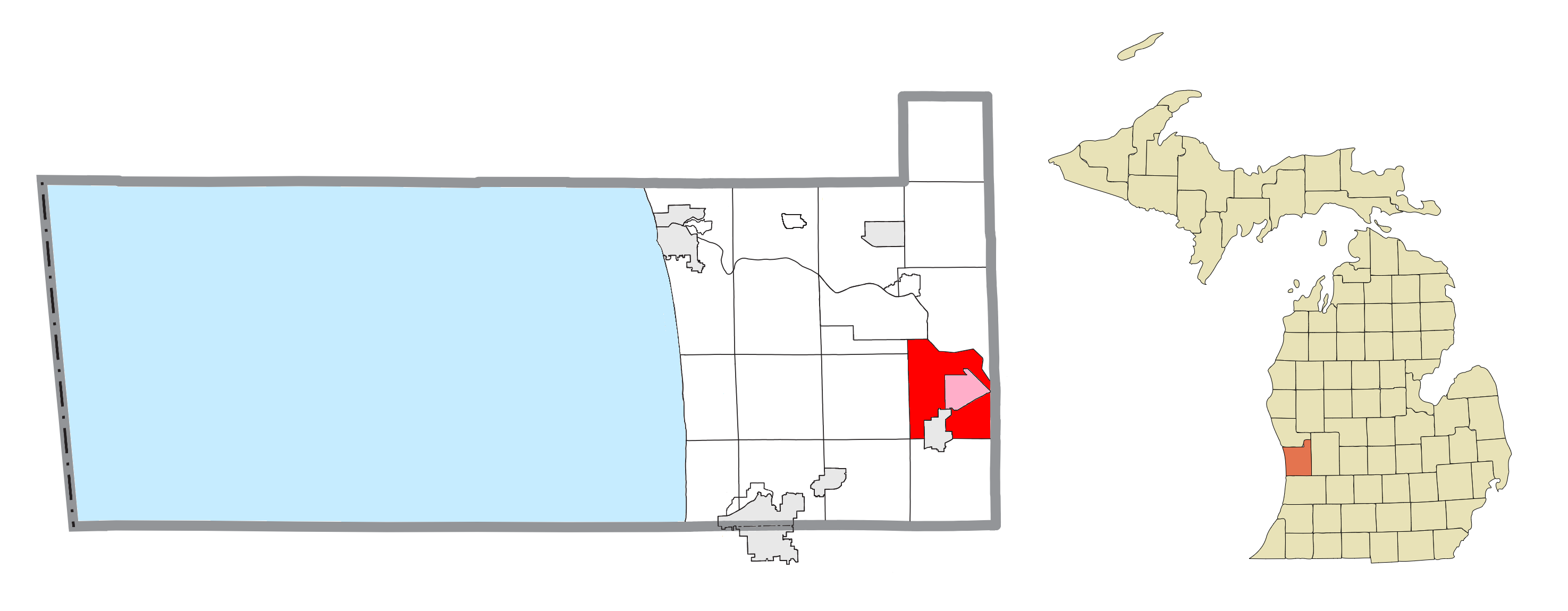
- Location within Ottawa County (red) and the administered CDP of Jenison (pink)

- Location within the state of Michigan Location within the United States
- Coordinates: 42°54′00″N 85°49′46″W
- Country: United States
- State: Michigan
- County: Ottawa
- Settled: 1834
- Established: 1840; 1965 (chartered)

Government
  - Supervisor: Jim Wierenga
  - Clerk: Ryan Kidd

Area
  - Total: 34.08 sq mi (88.27 km^{2})
  - Land: 33.17 sq mi (85.91 km^{2})
  - Water: 0.91 sq mi (2.36 km^{2})
- Elevation: 673 ft (205 m)

Population (2020)
  - Total: 54,091
  - Density: 1,630.7/sq mi (629.6/km^{2})
- Time zone: UTC-5 (Eastern (EST))
  - Summer (DST): UTC-4 (EDT)
- ZIP code(s): 49401 (Allendale); 49418 (Grandville); 49426 (Hudsonville); 49428, 49429 (Jenison)
- Area code: 616
- FIPS code: 26-31880
- GNIS feature ID: 1626346
- Website: Official website

Georgetown Charter Township is a charter township of Ottawa County in the U.S. state of Michigan. The population was 54,091 at the time of the 2020 census. The city of Hudsonville is adjacent to the township and the unincorporated community of Jenison is within the township, which includes about half the township's population.

== Geography ==
According to the United States Census Bureau, the township has a total area of 34.1 square miles (88 km^{2}), of which 33.5 square miles (87 km^{2}) is land and 0.6 square miles (1.6 km^{2}) (1.91%) is water.

== History ==
European-American settlement of Georgetown Township was begun in 1834 by the brothers Hiram and Samuel Jenison.

== Demographics ==
At the 2020 census there were 54,091 people, 19,164 households, and 14,290 families living in the township. The population density was 1,631.1 inhabitants per square mile (629.8/km^{2}). There were 19,878 housing units at an average density of 559.5 per square mile (216.0/km^{2}). The racial makeup of the township was 90.45% White, 1.32% Black or African American, 0.24% American Indian and Alaska Native, 1.48% Asian, 0.02% Native Hawaiian and Other Pacific Islander, 1.32% from some other race, and 5.19% from two or more races. Hispanic or Latino of any race were 4.30%.

Of the 14,099 households 41.0% had children under the age of 18 living with them, 71.9% were married couples living together, 5.1% had a female householder with no husband present, and 21.0% were non-families. 15.7% of households were one person and 7.6% were one person aged 65 or older. The average household size was 2.92 and the average family size was 3.29.

The age distribution was 29.4% under the age of 18, 10.9% from 18 to 24, 27.5% from 25 to 44, 21.6% from 45 to 64, and 10.6% 65 or older. The median age was 34 years. For every 100 females, there were 95.1 males. For every 100 females age 18 and over, there were 91.7 males.

The median household income was $58,936 and the median family income was $65,557. Males had a median income of $50,111 versus $28,894 for females. The per capita income for the township was $22,323. About 1.9% of families and 4.5% of the population were below the poverty line, including 3.0% of those under age 18 and 5.0% of those age 65 or over.

== Communities ==
- Jenison (unincorporated area)

== Education ==
Jenison Public Schools operates public schools in the Jenison area. Hudsonville Public Schools operates public schools in the Hudsonville area.

== Notable residents ==
- Glenn Duffie Shriver, American convicted of conspiracy to spy for China
