= Hudsonville, Michigan =

- City
- City of Hudsonville
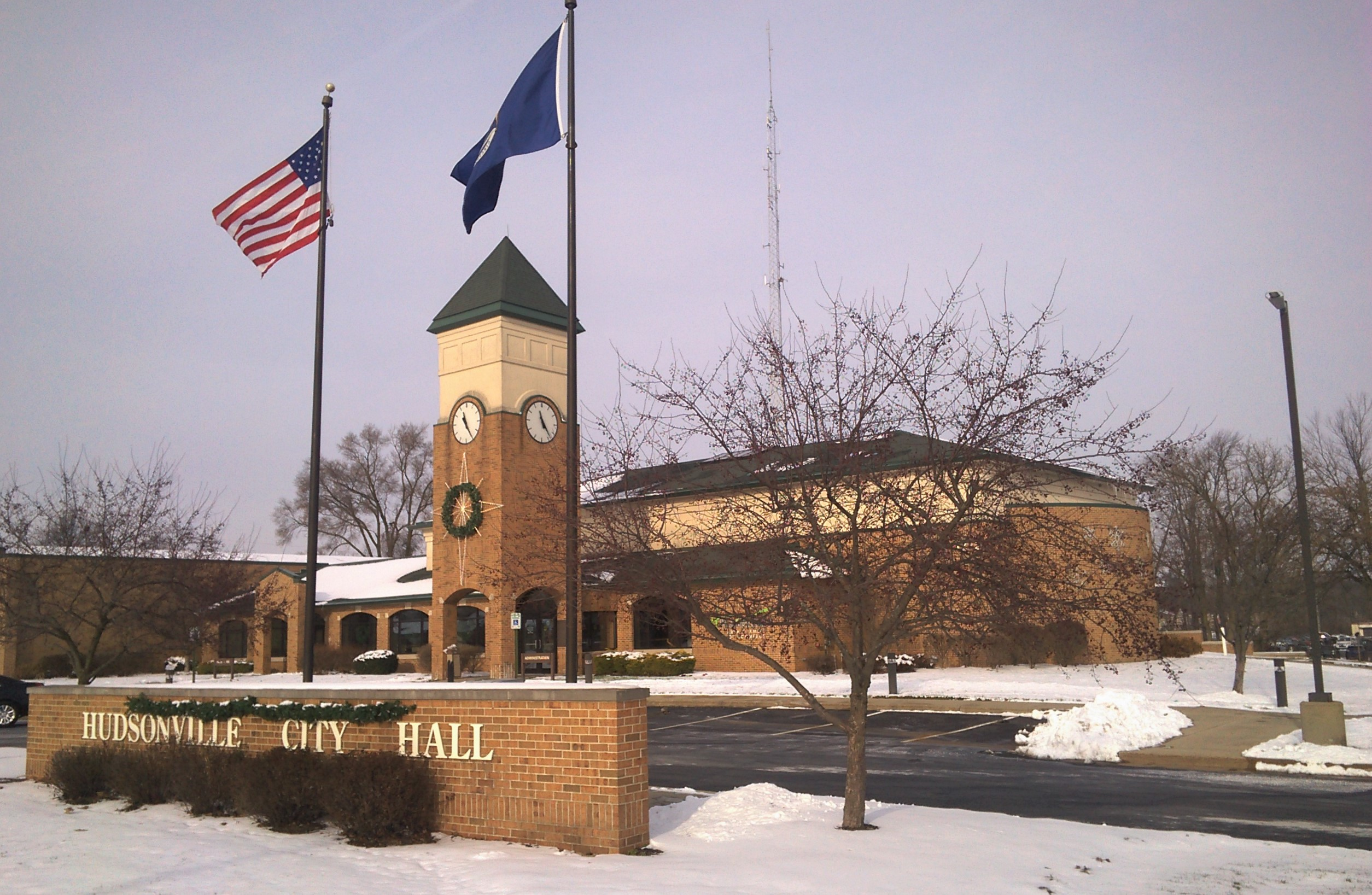
- Hudsonville City Hall
- Nickname: Michigan's Salad Bowl
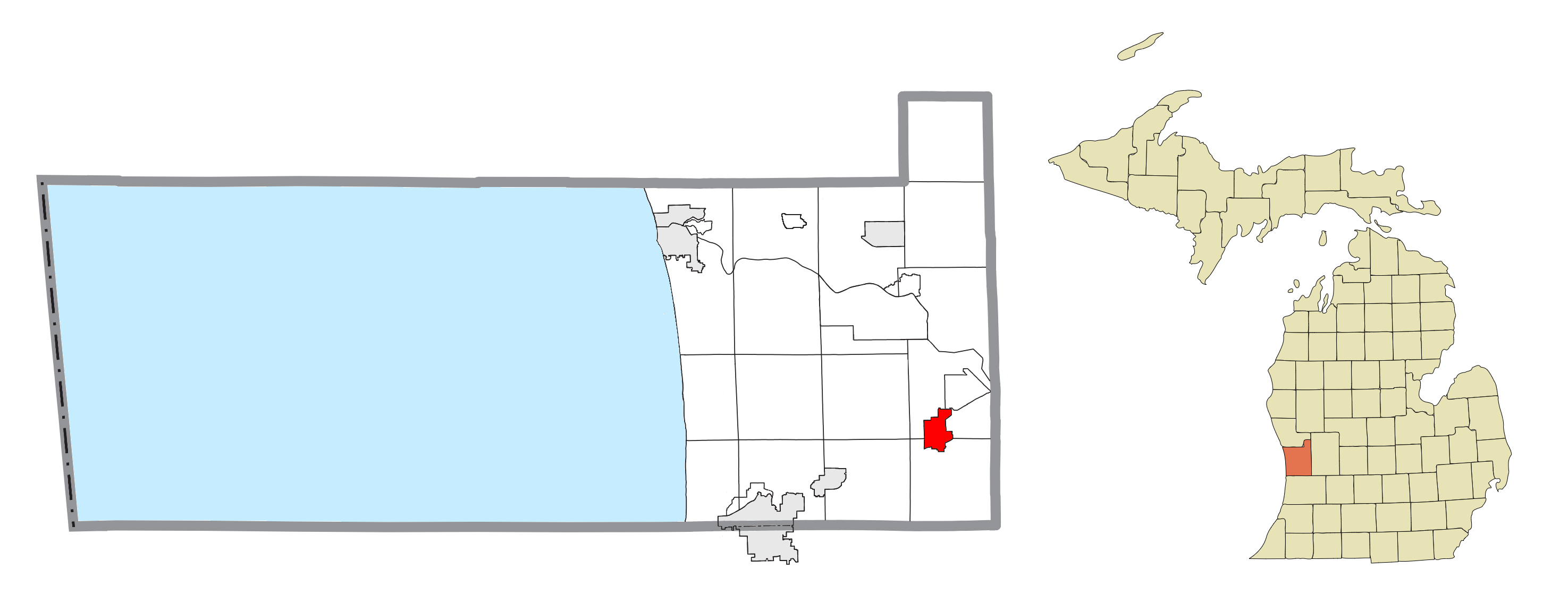
- Location within Ottawa County

- Location within the state of Michigan Location within the United States
- Coordinates: 42°52′15″N 85°51′54″W
- Country: United States
- State: Michigan
- County: Ottawa
- Settled: 1868
- Incorporated: 1926 (village); 1957 (city)

Government
  - Type: Council–manager
  - Mayor: Mark Northrup
  - Clerk: Jill Gruppen
  - Manager: R. Tyler Dotson

Area
  - Total: 4.12 sq mi (10.67 km^{2})
  - Land: 4.12 sq mi (10.67 km^{2})
  - Water: 0 sq mi (0.00 km^{2})
- Elevation: 659 ft (201 m)

Population (2020)
  - Total: 7,629
  - Density: 1,851.7/sq mi (714.9/km^{2})
- Time zone: UTC-5 (EST)
  - Summer (DST): UTC-4 (EDT)
- ZIP code(s): 49426
- Area code: 616
- FIPS code: 26-39800
- GNIS feature ID: 0628773
- Website: Official website

Hudsonville is a city in Ottawa County in the U.S. state of Michigan; it is part of the Grand Rapids metropolitan area. The population was 7,721 at the 2020 US Census. Hudsonville is nicknamed "Michigan's Salad Bowl."

== History ==
Hudsonville was platted in 1873, soon after the Chicago and West Michigan Railway was extended to that point. The town was named for Homer E. Hudson, a pioneer settler, who was also the town's first postmaster. The early settlement of Hudsonville was next to a swamp, which hampered early development. In 1872, construction of the Chicago and West Michigan Railroad was completed. The railroad brought more settlers to the area, including many Dutch immigrants. Long a village within Georgetown Township, it became a city in 1957.

== Geography ==
According to the United States Census Bureau, the city has a total area of 4.54 square miles (11.76 km^{2}), all land.

=== Points of interest ===
Terra Square is a mixed-use community center, located in downtown Hudsonville at 3380 Chicago Drive. Terra Square offers an event space and a work space, in addition to hosting the Hudsonville Farmers Market.

Hudsonville Nature Center is located at the east end of New Holland Dr. and features 5.4 miles of hiking trails, picnic areas, and lookouts in a 76 acre nature preserve.

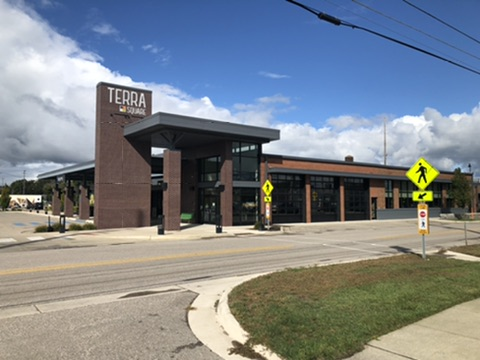
Terra Square

== Demographics ==
Historical population
Census	Pop.	Note	%±
1930	643		—
1940	837		30.2%
1950	1,101		31.5%
1960	2,649		140.6%
1970	3,523		33.0%
1980	4,844		37.5%
1990	6,170		27.4%
2000	7,160		16.0%
2010	7,116		−0.6%
2020	7,629		7.2%
U.S. Decennial Census

=== 2020 census ===
As of the 2020 census, Hudsonville had a population of 7,629. The median age was 35.0 years. 26.5% of residents were under the age of 18 and 16.5% of residents were 65 years of age or older. For every 100 females there were 94.5 males, and for every 100 females age 18 and over there were 91.4 males age 18 and over.

100.0% of residents lived in urban areas, while 0.0% lived in rural areas.

There were 2,816 households in Hudsonville, of which 34.1% had children under the age of 18 living in them. Of all households, 58.0% were married-couple households, 13.6% were households with a male householder and no spouse or partner present, and 23.9% were households with a female householder and no spouse or partner present. About 22.9% of all households were made up of individuals and 11.0% had someone living alone who was 65 years of age or older.

There were 2,880 housing units, of which 2.2% were vacant. The homeowner vacancy rate was 0.4% and the rental vacancy rate was 2.6%.

Racial composition as of the 2020 census
Race	Number	Percent
White	6,862	89.9%
Black or African American	102	1.3%
American Indian and Alaska Native	31	0.4%
Asian	77	1.0%
Native Hawaiian and Other Pacific Islander	4	0.1%
Some other race	97	1.3%
Two or more races	456	6.0%
Hispanic or Latino (of any race)	375	4.9%

=== 2010 census ===
As of the census of 2010, there were 7,116 people, 2,582 households, and 1,901 families living in the city. The population density was 1,718.8 inhabitants per square mile (663.6/km^{2}). There were 2,712 housing units at an average density of 655.1 per square mile (252.9/km^{2}). The racial makeup of the city was 94.3% White, 1.5% African American, 0.4% Native American, 0.8% Asian, 1.3% from other races, and 1.7% from two or more races. Hispanic or Latino of any race were 3.2% of the population.

There were 2,582 households, of which 37.1% had children under the age of 18 living with them, 60.4% were married couples living together, 9.8% had a female householder with no husband present, 3.4% had a male householder with no wife present, and 26.4% were non-families. 23.0% of all households were made up of individuals, and 10.2% had someone living alone who was 65 years of age or older. The average household size was 2.71 and the average family size was 3.20.

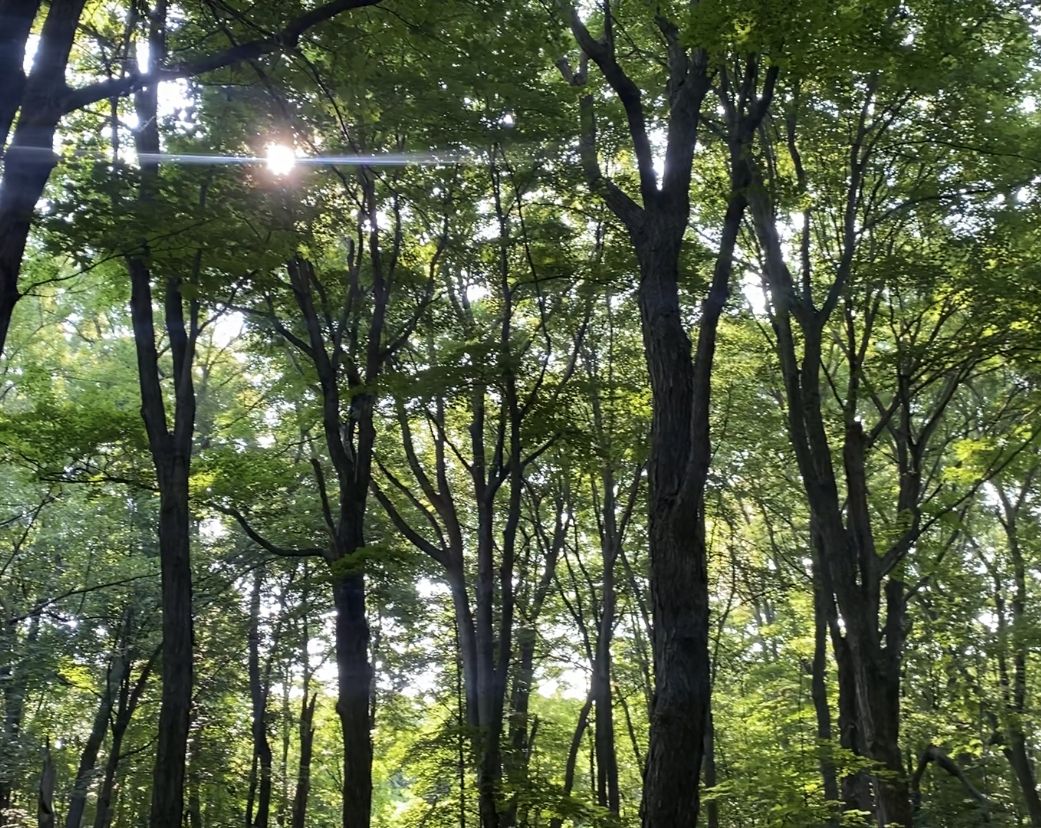
Hudsonville Nature Center

The median age in the city was 33.5 years. 28.4% of residents were under the age of 18; 8.8% were between the ages of 18 and 24; 25.8% were from 25 to 44; 22.5% were from 45 to 64; and 14.5% were 65 years of age or older. The gender makeup of the city was 47.7% male and 52.3% female.

=== 2000 census ===
As of the census of 2000, there were 7,160 people, 2,514 households, and 1,920 families living in the city. The population density was 1,729.1 inhabitants per square mile (667.6/km^{2}). There were 2,598 housing units at an average density of 627.4 per square mile (242.2/km^{2}). The racial makeup of the city was 97.71% White, 0.47% African American, 0.27% Native American, 0.41% Asian, 0.01% Pacific Islander, 0.39% from other races, and 0.74% from two or more races. Hispanic or Latino of any race were 1.45% of the population.

There were 2,514 households, out of which 39.5% had children under the age of 18 living with them, 66.4% were married couples living together, 7.5% had a female householder with no husband present, and 23.6% were non-families. 20.4% of all households were made up of individuals, and 9.6% had someone living alone who was 65 years of age or older. The average household size was 2.80 and the average family size was 3.26.

In the city, the population was spread out, with 30.8% under the age of 18, 9.5% from 18 to 24, 28.2% from 25 to 44, 16.6% from 45 to 64, and 14.9% who were 65 years of age or older. The median age was 32 years. For every 100 females, there were 91.9 males. For every 100 females age 18 and over, there were 87.6 males.

The median income for a household in the city was $46,961, and the median income for a family was $55,372. Males had a median income of $41,418 versus $26,554 for females. The per capita income for the city was $19,286. About 2.4% of families and 4.6% of the population were below the poverty line, including 5.8% of those under age 18 and 3.6% of those age 65 or over.

== Notable people ==
- Isaac TeSlaa, professional football player, Detroit Lions
- Bethany Balcer, professional soccer player, grew up in Hudsonville
- Taylor Lautner, actor, grew up in Hudsonville
- John Vander Wal, Major League Baseball player, grew up in Hudsonville
