= Lists of webcomics =

This is a list of all lists of webcomics, sorted by varying classifications.

== By genre or subject ==
- List of webcomics with LGBT characters
- List of video game webcomics
- List of anthropomorphic (furry) webcomics
- List of Heroes graphic novels

== By date ==
- List of early webcomics
- 1995 to 1999 in webcomics
- 2000 in webcomics
- 2001 in webcomics
- 2002 in webcomics
- 2003 in webcomics
- 2004 in webcomics
- 2005 in webcomics
- 2006 in webcomics
- 2007 in webcomics
- 2008 in webcomics
- 2009 in webcomics
- 2010 in webcomics
- 2011 in webcomics
- 2012 in webcomics
- 2013 in webcomics
- 2014 in webcomics
- 2015 in webcomics
- 2016 in webcomics
- 2017 in webcomics
- 2018 in webcomics
- 2019 in webcomics
- 2020 in webcomics
- 2021 in webcomics
- 2022 in webcomics
- 2023 in webcomics

== Other lists ==
- List of webcomics in print

== See also ==
- Lists of comics
- List of webcomic creators
- All lists marked as part of the Webcomics Work Group, a group within ProjectComics
