= 2011 in webcomics =

Notable events of 2011 in webcomics.

== Events ==
- Namco Bandai started subsidiary ShiftyLook, with the purpose to revive unused video game characters from the company's past with webcomics.
- International webcomic platform MangaMagazine.net, which later became Inkblazers, is founded by Victor Chu and Bancha Dhammarungruang.
- Dark Horse Comics releases Dark Horse Digital, an iOS app that functions as a digital store front for webcomics.

=== Awards ===
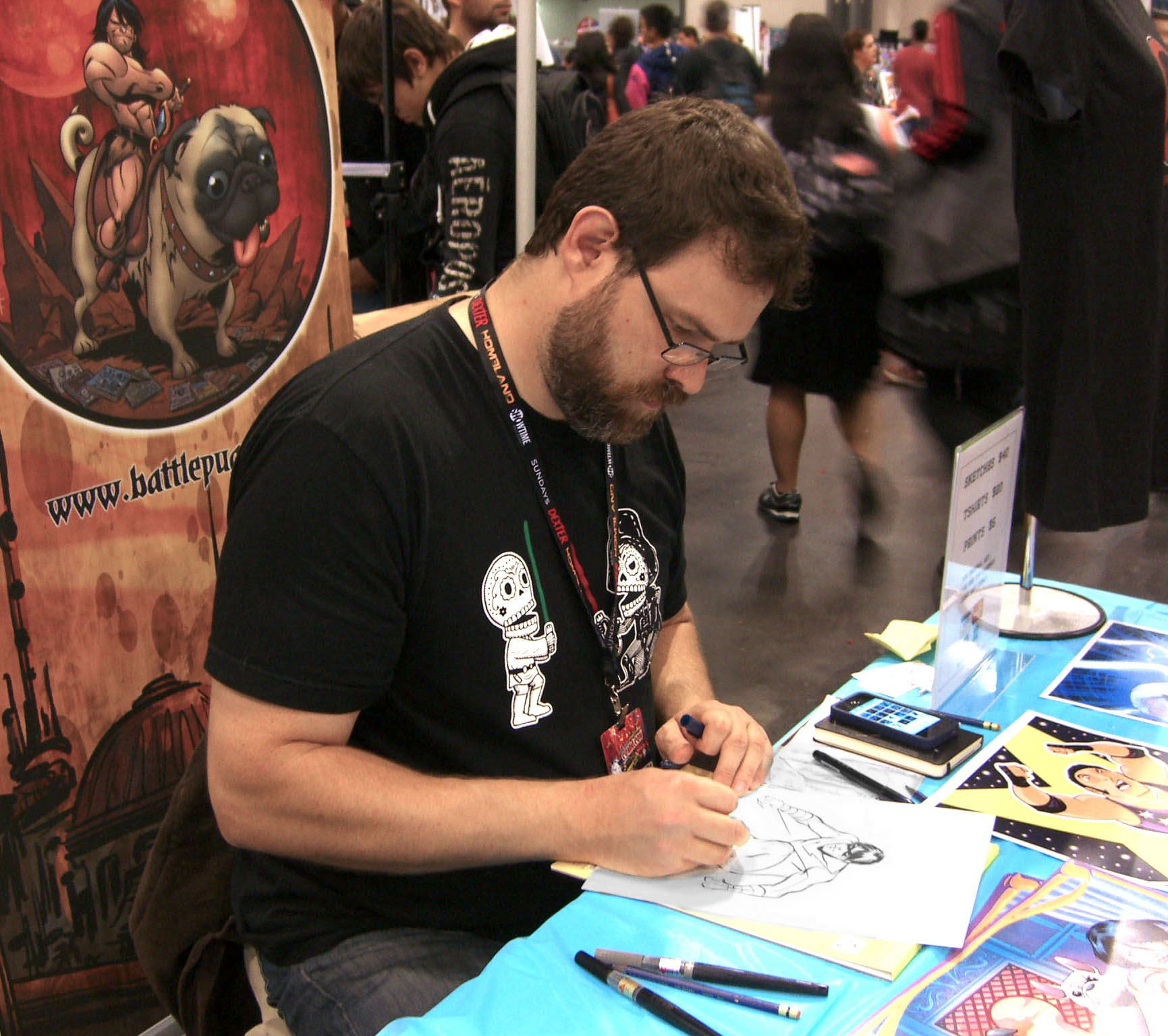
Mike Norton went on to win an Eisner Award for Battlepug in 2012.

- Eagle Awards, "Favourite Web-Based Comic" won by Ethan Nicolle and Malachai Nicolle's Axe Cop.
- Eisner Awards, "Best Digital Comic" won by Karl Kerschl's Abominable Charles Christopher.
- Harvey Awards, "Best Online Comics Work" won by Kate Beaton's Hark! A Vagrant.
- Joe Shuster Award, "Outstanding Web Comics Creator(s)" won by Emily Carroll.
- Ignatz Awards, "Outstanding Online Comic" won by Kate Beaton's Hark! A Vagrant.
- Aurora Awards, "Best Graphic Novel" won by Tarol Hunt's Goblins.
- Hugo Award for Best Graphic Story won by Kaja Foglio, Phil Foglio, and Cheyenne Wright's Girl Genius, Volume 10.

=== Webcomics started ===
- February 2 — Dr. Frost by Lee Jong-beom
- February 14 — Battlepug by Mike Norton
- March 12 — Prequel (or Making A Cat Cry: The Adventure) by Kazerad
- March 25 — Artifice by Alex Woolfson
- April 3 — Cucumber Quest by Gigi D.G.
- May 24 — Steroids 'n' Asteroids with Quadra Blu by Lyman Dally
- May 28 — Delilah Dirk and the Turkish Lieutenant by Tony Cliff
- June 2 — Dorris McComics by Alex Norris
- July — Bongcheon-Dong Ghost by Horang
- September 7 — War and Peas by Jonathan Kunz and Elizabeth Pich
- September — A Redtail's Dream by Minna Sundberg
- October — The Fox Sister by Christina Strain and Jayd Aït-Kaci
- November 1 — Gaia by Oliver Knörzer and Puri Andini
- November 26 — JL8 by Yale Stewart
- Bucko by Jeff Parker and Erika Moen
- Fashion King by Kian84
- Girls of the Wild's by Hun and Zhena (Kim Hye-jin)
- God of Bath by Ha Il-kwon
- Orange Marmalade by Seok Woo

=== Webcomics ended ===
- Digger by Ursula Vernon, 2003 – 2011
- The Phoenix Requiem by Sarah Ellerton, 2007 – 2011
- Hori-san to Miyamura-kun by HERO, 2007 – 2011
- FreakAngels by Warren Ellis and Paul Duffield, 2008 – 2011
