= 2015 in webcomics =

Notable events of 2015 in webcomics.

== Events ==
- Randall Munroe of xkcd released a collection of illustrations called Thing Explainer on 24 November, based on his comic "Up Goer Five".
- Chris Onstad of the webcomic Achewood resumed to posting new comics on December 24, after 20 months of hiatus.

=== Awards ===
- Eisner Awards, "Best Digital Comic" won by Brian K. Vaughan and Marcos Martin's The Private Eye.
- Harvey Awards, "Best Online Comics Work" won by Brian K. Vaughan and Marcos Martin's The Private Eye.
- Ignatz Awards, "Outstanding Online Comic" won by Lilli Carré's The Bloody Footprint.
- Joe Shuster Awards, "Outstanding Webcomic Creator" won by Nicole Chartrand (Fey Winds).
- Reuben Awards, "Online Comics"; Short Form won by Danielle Corsetto's Girls with Slingshots, Long Form won by Minna Sundberg's Stand Still, Stay Silent.
- Cartoonist Studio Prize, "Best Web Comic" won by Winston Rowntree's Watching.
- Aurora Awards, "Best Graphic Novel" won by Kari Maaren's It Never Rains.
- Cybil Awards, "Young Adult Graphic Novel" won by ND Stevenson's Nimona.
- WEBTOON's Webtoonist Day, "Webtoonist of the Year" won by Oh Seong-dae's Tales of the Unusual.

=== Webcomics started ===
- April 1 — Yumi's Cells by Lee Dong-geun
- April 3 — Never Satisfied by Taylor Robin
- May — Fantome-Stein by Beka Duke
- May 14 — How to Love by Alex Norris
- April 6 — Sleepless Domain by Mary Cagle
- August 31 — Cyberforce by Marc Silvestri
- September 13 — Gosu by Giun Ryu and Mun Jeong Hoo
- October — Finnish Nightmares by Karoliina Korhonen
- October 3 — 33-sai Dokushin Onna Kishi Taichō by Amahara
- December 26 — These Memories Won't Last by Stu Campbell
- Time Prisoners by Bai Xiao
- Urbanlore by Kaveri Gopalakrishnan and Aarthi Parthasarathy

=== Webcomics ended ===
- 319 Dark Street by David Wade, 2004 – 2015
- Girls With Slingshots by Danielle Corsetto, 2004 – 2015
- The Private Eye by Brian K. Vaughan and Marcos Martín, 2013 – 2015
