= 2023 in webcomics =

Notable events of 2023 in webcomics.

== Events ==
=== Awards ===
- Eisner Awards, "Best Webcomic" won by Rachel Smythe's Lore Olympus
- Harvey Awards, "Digital Book of the Year" won by Rachel Smythe's Lore Olympus
- Ignatz Awards, "Outstanding Online Comic" won by Reimena Yee's The God of Arepo
- Next Manga Award, "Web Manga" won by Sumiko Arai's The Guy She Was Interested in Wasn't a Guy at All

=== Webcomics started ===
- January 1 – Firefly Wedding by Oreco Tachibana
- January 23 – Jiangshi X by Norihiko Kurazono
- February 5 – Neko ni Tensei Shita Oji-san by Yajima
- February 22 – Isekai Samurai by Keigo Saitō
- February 24 – King's Proposal by Kōshi Tachibana and Nemo Kurio
- February 25 – Beat & Motion by Naoki Fujita
- June 26 – Spacewalking with You by Inuhiko Doronoda
- May 27 – Bite Maker: AK by Miwako Sugiyama
- August 1 – Good Night World End by Uru Okabe
- December 7 – The Angel Next Door Spoils Me Rotten: After the Rain by Saekisan and Puyo

=== Webcomics ended ===
- Chō yo Hana yo by Zenyu Shimabukuro, 2017–2023
- Excuse Me Dentist, It's Touching Me! by Sho Yamazaki, 2020–2023
- Love Revolution by 232, 2013–2023
- Tomorrow by Llama, 2017–2023
