= 2016 in webcomics =

This article presents a list of notable events of 2016 in webcomics.

== Events ==
On April 13, 2016, Andrew Hussie finished his webcomic Homestuck. In 7 years he published over 8000 pages of content.

- On April Fools' Day, a large group of webcomic artists published their own version of the same four-panel webcomic, satirizing debates on unoriginality and joke-theft.
- In December, Chris Onstad puts Achewood on hiatus again indefinitely.

=== Awards ===
- Eisner Awards, "Best Digital/Webcomic" won by Paul Tobin and Colleen Coover's Bandette.
- Harvey Awards, "Best Online Comics Work" won by Mike Norton's Battlepug.
- Ignatz Award, "Outstanding Online Comic" won by Meredith Gran's Octopus Pie.
- Reuben Awards, "Online Comics"; Short Form won by Dave Kellett's Sheldon, Long Form won by Drew Weing's The Creepy Case Files of Margo Maloo.
- Cartoonist Studio Prize, "Best Web Comic" won by Boulet's I Want to Believe.

=== Webcomics started ===
- January — Les Culottées by Pénélope Bagieu
- January 14 — Terror Man by Han Dong-Woo and Ko Jin-Ho
- January 23 — Nano List by Min Song-ah
- March — Siren's Lament by instantmiso
- March 18–December 16 — Helios:Femina by Michelle Phan
- April 5–September 27 — The Red Hook by Dean Haspiel
- April 21 — Overwatch digital comics series by James Waugh
- May 13 — Lady of the Shard by Gigi D.G.
- May 13 — Dents by Beth Behrs, Matt Doyle & Sid Kotian
- May 24 — unOrdinary by uruchan
- June 25 — Brown Paperbag by Sailesh Gopalan
- July 15 — Otokonoko Zuma by Crystal na Yousuke
- July 26 — Webcomic Name by Alex Norris
- October 28 — Hello World! by Alex Norris
- November 15 — Adventures of God by Teo and Corey
- December 1 — Firebrand by Jessica Chobot and Erika Lewis

=== Webcomics ended ===
- Homestuck by Andrew Hussie, 2009 – 2016
- Battlepug by Mike Norton, 2011 – 2016
- Girls of the Wild's by Hun and Zhena, 2011 – 2016
- Soul Cartel by Kim Eun-hyo and Kim Yeong-ji, 2012 – 2016
- Henchgirl by Kristen Gudsnuk, 2013 – 2016
- Bastard by Kim Carnby and Hwang Young-chan, 2014 – 2016
- Demon by Jason Shiga, 2014 – 2016
- Cyberforce by Marc Silvestri, 2015 – 2016
- How to Love by Alex Norris, 2015 – 2016
