= 2013 in webcomics =

Notable events of 2013 in webcomics.

== Events ==
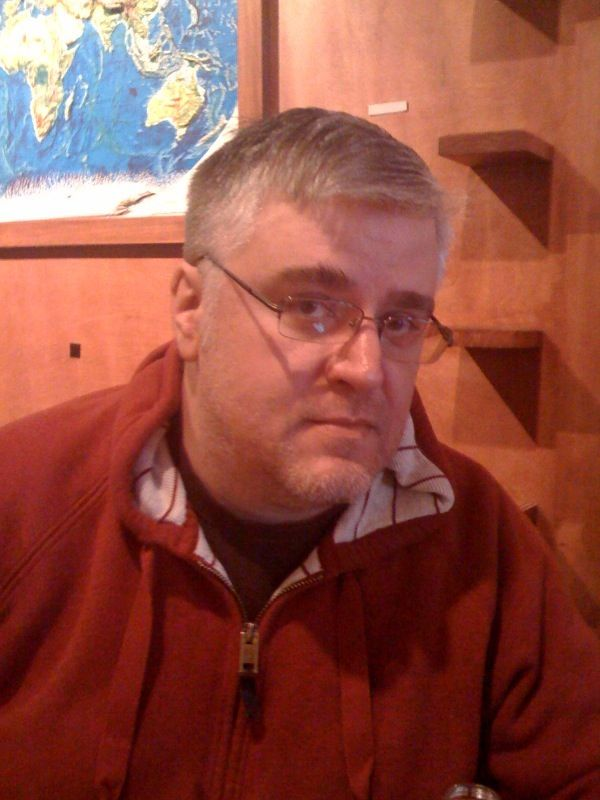
Joey Manley greatly influenced the business model of webcomics.

- Randall Munroe creates the Hugo Award-winning 3,099 panel xkcd strip "Time".
- The Modern Tales family of websites closes in April.
- Joey Manley, founder of webcomic syndicates such as Modern Tales and Webcomics Nation, dies at age 48.

=== Awards ===
- Eisner Awards "Best digital comic" won by Paul Tobin and Colleen Coover's Bandette.
- Harvey Awards, "Best Online Comics Work" won by Mike Norton's Battlepug.
- Ignatz Awards, "Outstanding Online Comic" won by Jillian Tamaki's SuperMutant Magic Academy.
- Joe Shuster Awards, "Outstanding Webcomics Creator" won by Michael DeForge (Ant Comic).
- Reuben Awards, "On-Line Comics"; Short Form won by Graham Harrop's Ten Cats, Long Form won by Vince Dorse's Untold Tales of Bigfoot.
- Cartoonist Studio Prize, "Best Web Comic" won by ND Stevenson's Nimona.
- Aurora Awards, "Best Graphic Novel" won by Alina Pete's Weregeek.
- Mythopoeic Fantasy Award for Adult Literature won by Ursula Vernon's Digger.

=== Webcomics started ===
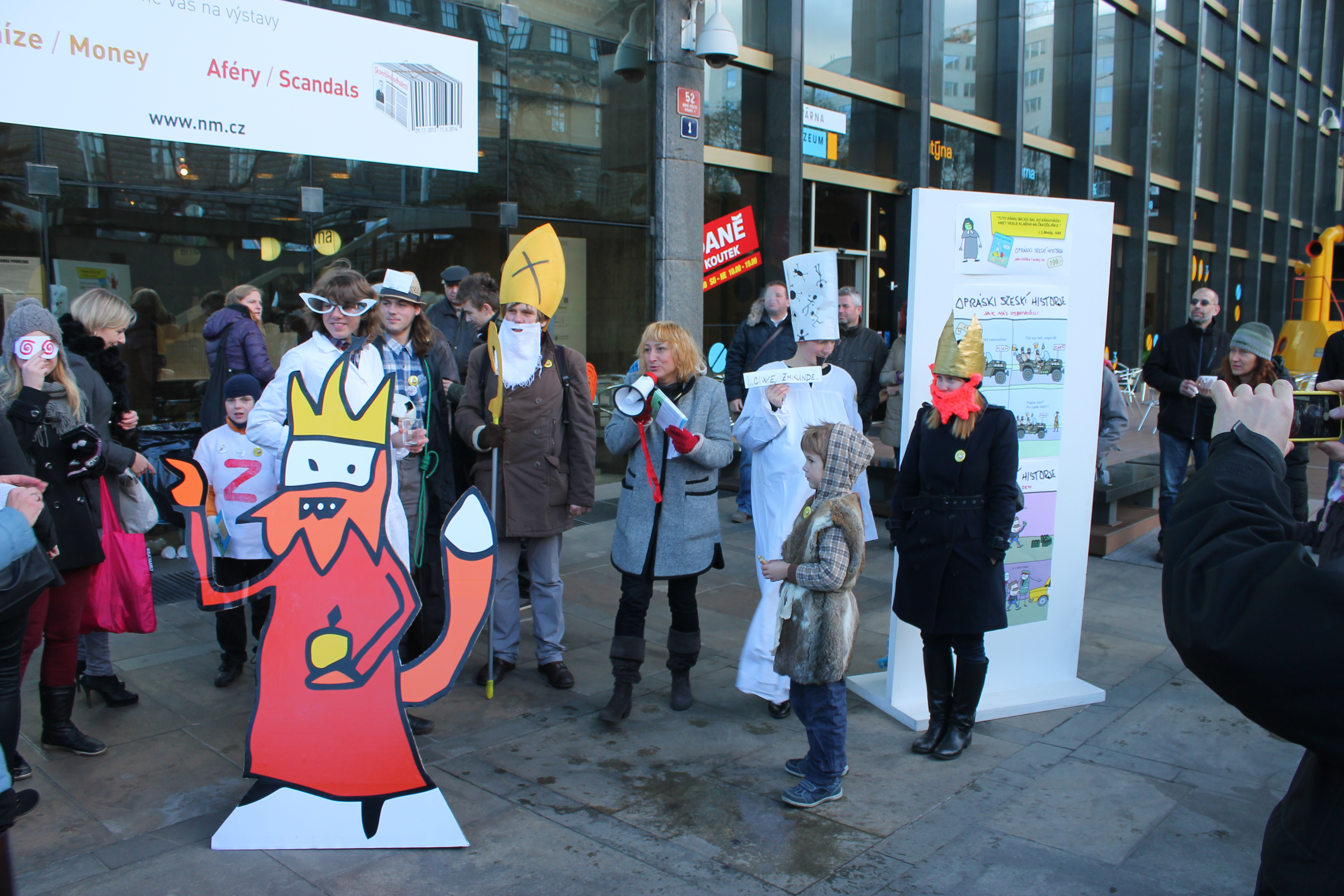
Opráski sčeskí historje (lit. "The Pictures of the Czech History", though misspelled), among the most popular Czech webcomics, started in 2013.

- January 26 — A Simple Thinking About Blood Type by Real Crazy Man
- January 28 — Table Titans by Scott Kurtz
- March – The Private Eye by Brian K. Vaughan and Marcos Martín
- April – Kill Six Billion Demons by "Abbadon" (Tom Parkinson-Morgan)
- May – Up and Out by Julia Kaye
- May 8 — Tales of the Unusual by Oh Seong-dae
- June – Henchgirl by Kristen Gudsnuk
- June 30 — Qahera by Deena Mohamed
- July – Fowl Language by Brian Gordon
- August 8 — Check, Please! by Ngozi Ukazu
- August — ēlDLIVE by Akira Amano
- September 4 – Love Revolution by 232
- September 5 — The Gamer by Sung Sang-Young and Sang-Ah
- October 8 – The Last Halloween by Abby Howard
- October 12 — ReLIFE by Sō Yayoi
- October 31 – Blindsprings by Kadi Fedoruk
- November 1 — Stand Still, Stay Silent by Minna Sundberg
- November 21 – Let's Speak English by Mary Cagle
- November — Trans Girl Next Door by Kylie Summer Wu
- December 8 – Wind Breaker by Yongseok Jo
- December 11 — Million Doll by Ai
- Sarah's Scribbles by Sarah Andersen
- Year Hare Affair by Lin Chao

=== Webcomics ended ===
- FreakAngels by Warren Ellis and Paul Duffield, 2008 – 2013
- Fashion King by Kian84, 2011 – 2013
- Orange Marmalade by Seok Woo, 2011 – 2013
- A Redtail's Dream by Minna Sundberg, 2011 – 2013
- Misaeng by Yoon Tae-ho, 2012 – 2013
