= 2021 in webcomics =

Notable events of 2021 in webcomics.

== Events ==
=== Awards ===
- Eisner Awards, "Best Webcomic" won by Simon Hanselmann's Crisis Zone
- Harvey Awards, "Digital Book of the Year" won by Rachel Smythe's Lore Olympus
- Ignatz Awards, "Outstanding Online Comic" won by Michael DeForge's Birds of Maine
- Next Manga Award, "Web Manga" won by Naoya Matsumoto's Kaiju No. 8

=== Webcomics started ===
- February 17 — Chuhai Lips: Canned Flavor of Married Women by Chinjao Musume and Tama Nogami
- February 25 — Stomp, Kick, Love by Sumi Ichiya
- March 1 — The Invisible Man and His Soon-to-Be Wife by Iwatobineko
- March 22 — Return of the Blossoming Blade by Studio LICO and Biga
- April 30 — Don't Stop My Beautification by Mana Aizen
- May 19 — With You, Our Love Will Make It Through by Chihiro Yuzuki
- June 24 – Studio Cabana by Agri Uma
- July 9 – Hoshitabi Shōnen by Sakana Sakatsuki
- September 1 — Shota Oni by Miyuki Nakamura
- October 9 — Dara-san of Reiwa by Haruomi Tomotsuka
- November 25 — Soara and the House of Monsters by Hidenori Yamaji

=== Webcomics ended ===
- Crossdressing Pandemic by Mikuzu Shinagawa, 2019–2021
- Doctor Elise by Yuin and Mini, 2017–2021
- Dr. Frost by Lee Jong-beom, 2011–2021
- Mr. Boop by Alec Robbins, 2020–2021
- Romance 101 by Namsoo, 2018–2021
- Senpai wa Otokonoko by Pom, 2019–2021
- Solo Leveling by Chugong, 2016–2021
- Why Raeliana Ended Up at the Duke's Mansion by Milcha and Whale, 2017–2021
