= Brown Paper Bag =

Brown Paper Bag may refer to:

- Brown paper bag, a paper bag of brown color

== Songs ==
- "Brown Paper Bag", by Birdman and Lil Wayne from Like Father, Like Son, 2006
- "Brown Paper Bag", by DJ Khaled from We the Best, 2007
- "Brown Paper Bag", by Migos from Culture, 2017
- "Brown Paper Bag", by Roni Size from New Forms, 1997
- "Brown Paper Bag", by the Syndicate of Sound, 1970
- "Brown Paper Bag", by Tammy Wynette, 1975

== Other uses ==
- Brown Paperbag, a webcomic by Sailesh Gopalan
- Brown paper bag test, a term in African-American oral history
- Brown Paper Bag, winner of the 2003 BAFTA Award for Best Short Film

== See also ==
- Paper bag (disambiguation)
