= 2014 in webcomics =

Notable events of 2014 in webcomics.

== Events ==
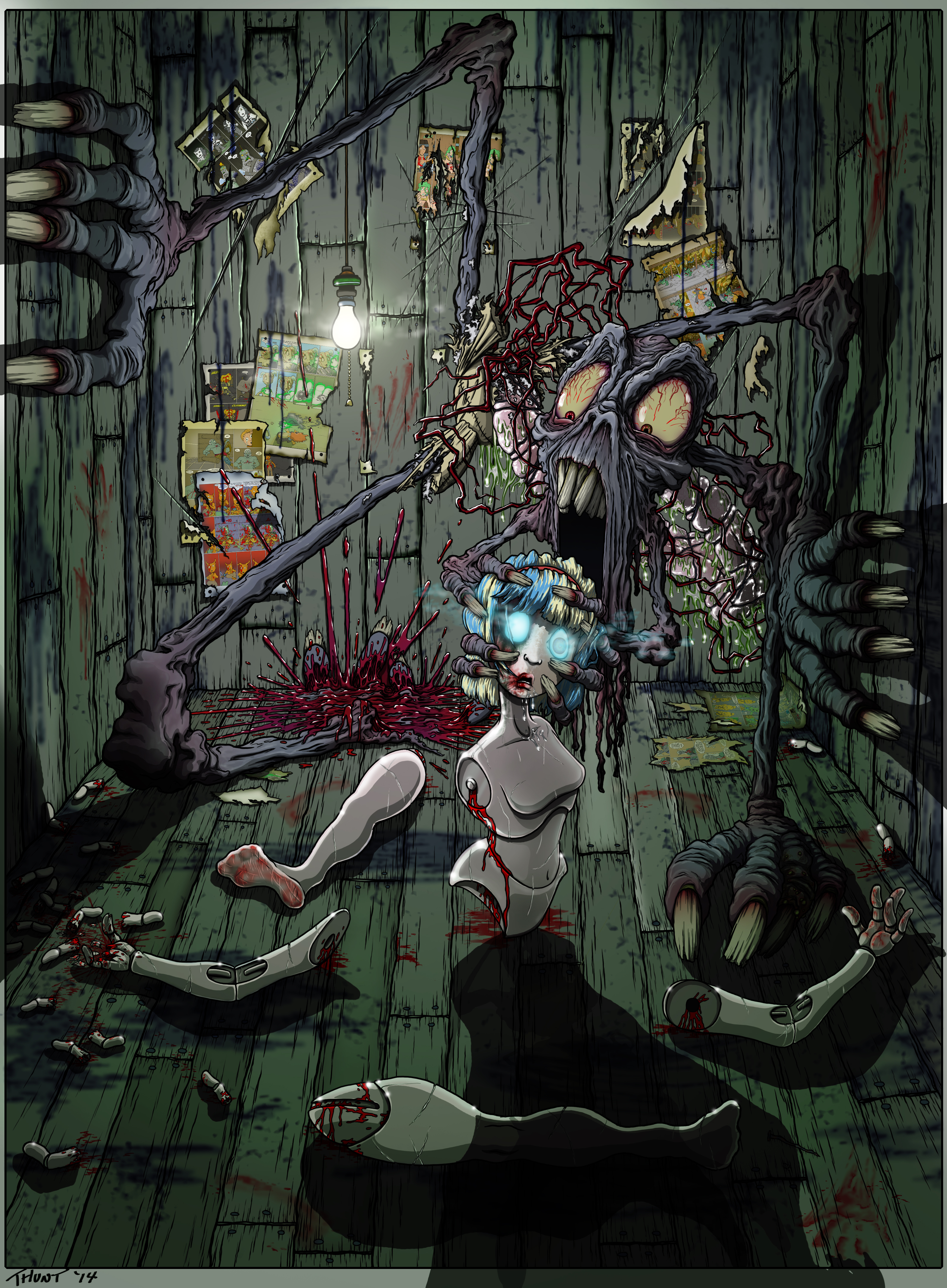
In 2014, Ellipsis Stephens' Goblins went on hiatus as its creator suffered a nervous breakdown. Two months later, Stephens published this image.

- Naver Corporation globally launched WEBTOON on July 2.
- Namco Bandai subsidiary ShiftyLook shut down in March.

=== Awards ===
- Eisner Awards, "Best Digital Comic" won by Matthew Inman's The Oatmeal.
- Harvey Awards, "Best Online Comics Work" won by Mike Norton's Battlepug.
- Ignatz Award, "Outstanding Online Comic" won by Evan Dahm's Vattu.
- Joe Shuster Awards, "Outstanding Webcomic Creator" won by Jayd Aït-Kaci and Christina Strain (The Fox Sister).
- Reuben Awards, "Online Comics"; Short Form won by Ryan Pagelow's Buni, Long Form won by Jeff Smith's Tuki: Save the Humans.
- Cartoonist Studio Prize, "Best Web Comic" won by Emily Carroll's Out of Skin.
- Aurora Awards, "Best Graphic Novel" won by Peter Chiykowski's Rock, Paper, Cynic.
- Hugo Award for Best Graphic Story won by Randall Munroe's "Time".

=== Webcomics started ===
- January 1 — Eth's Skin by Sfé R. Monster
- January 6 — Harpy Gee by Brianne Drouhard
- January 31 — Demon by Jason Shiga
- February 12 — unTouchable by massstar
- April 13 — Paradox Space by Andrew Hussie and various others
- May — Pepper&Carrot by David Revoy
- June 15 — Sanitary Panels by Rachita Taneja
- August 13 — Tahilalats by Nurfadli Mursyid
- August–December — No Girlfriend Comics by Brandon Sheffield and Dami Lee
- October 19 — Devil's Candy by Clint Bickham and Priscilla Hamby
- November — The Royal Existentials by Aarthi Parthasarathy
- November 20 — Lookism by Taejun Pak
- Congqian Youzuo Lingjianshan by Guowang Bixia and Zhuhua and Junxiaomo.
- Bugcat Capoo by Yara
- Princess Maison by Aoi Ikebe
- Witchy by Ariel Ries

=== Webcomics ended ===
- Pictures for Sad Children by Simone Veil, 2007 – 2014
- Brawl in the Family by Matthew Taranto, 2008 – 2014
- Gunshow by KC Green, 2008 – 2014
- Nimona by ND Stevenson, 2012 – 2014
