= 2018 in webcomics =

Notable events of 2018 in webcomics.

== Events ==
- Nicholas Gurewitch announced that he was cutting back on the production of The Perry Bible Fellowship. While it used to be a weekly strip, it is now infrequently updated.

=== Awards ===
- Eisner Awards, "Best Webcomic" won by Katie O’Neill's The Tea Dragon Society.
- Ignatz Awards, "Outstanding Online Comic" won by Carta Monir's Lara Croft Was My Family.
- Joe Shuster Awards, "Outstanding Webcomic Creator" won by Gisele Lagace (Ménage à 3).
- Harvey Awards, "Digital Book of the Year" won by Brian K. Vaughan, Marcos Martín, and Muntsa Vicente's Barrier.
- Reuben Awards, "Online Comics"; Short Form won by Gemma Correll's Gemma Correll, Long Form won by John Allison's Bad Machinery.
- Ringo Awards:
  - "Favorite Publisher" won by WEBTOON.
  - "Best Webcomic" won by Sanford Greene's 1000.
- Cartoonist Studio Prize, "Best Web Comic" won by Michael DeForge's Leaving Richard's Valley.
- Aurora Awards, "Best Graphic Novel" won by Peter Chiykowski's Rock, Paper, Cynic.

=== Webcomics started ===
- March 4 — Lore Olympus by Rachel Smythe
- March 4 — Solo Leveling by Chugong
- March 13 — Romance 101 by Namsoo
- April 2 — True Beauty by Yaongyi
- May 19 — A Returner's Magic Should Be Special by Usonan and Wookjakga
- July 7 — The Beginning After the End by TurtleMe and Fuyuki23
- August 11 — Oct 13 — Your Letter by Hyun-ah Cho
- August 20 — Mage & Demon Queen by Kuru
- October 2 — Eleceed by Son Je-ho and Zhena
- October 21 — SubZero by Junepurrr
- Acursian by John Barrowman
- Backchannel by Stan Lee and Tom Akel
- Caster by Common and Noble Transmission

=== Webcomics ended ===
- Guilded Age by T Campbell, Phil Kahn, Erica Henderson, & the Waltrip brothers, 2009 – 2018
- Hello World! by Alex Norris, 2016 – 2018
- Nano List by Min Song-ah, 2016 – 2018
- Leaving Richard's Valley by Michael DeForge, 2017 – 2018
- War Cry by Dean Haspiel, 2017 – 2018
- Woman World by Aminder Dhaliwal, 2017 – 2018
- 1000 by Chuck Brown and Sanford Greene, 2017 – 2018
