= 2017 in webcomics =

Notable events of 2017 in webcomics.

== Events ==
=== Awards ===
- Eisner Awards, "Best Webcomic" won by Anne Szabla's Bird Boy.
- Ignatz Awards, "Outstanding Online Comic" won by Der-Shing Helmer's The Meek.
- Joe Shuster Awards, "Outstanding Webcomic Creator" won by Ty Templeton (Bun Toons).
- Reuben Awards, "Online Comics"; Short Form won by Ruben Bolling's Donald and John, Long Form won by Ngozi Ukazu's Check, Please!.
- Ringo Awards, "Best Webcomic" won by Dean Haspiel's The Red Hook.
- Cartoonist Studio Prize, "Best Web Comic" won by Christina Tran's On Beauty.
- Special Prometheus Award won by Mark Stanley's Freefall.

=== Webcomics started ===
- January 10 — Leaving Richard's Valley by Michael DeForge
- March 6 — My Giant Nerd Boyfriend by Fishball
- March 8 — Woman World by Aminder Dhaliwal
- March 18 — Dogeza de Tanondemita by Kazuki Funatsu
- April 7 — I Love Yoo by Quimchee
- May 12 — Cheshire Crossing (2nd version) by Andy Weir and Sarah Andersen
- May 20 — Tomorrow by Llama
- June — SandSerif by Sandy
- June — StoneToss
- June 30 — Chō yo Hana yo by Zenyu Shimabukuro
- July 5 — 17776 by Jon Bois
- September 3 — Why Raeliana Ended Up at the Duke's Mansion by Milcha and Whale
- September 18 — Doctor Elise by Yuin and Mini
- October 3 — Nothing Special by Katie Cook
- October 12 — Sweet Home by Kim Carnby and Hwang Young-chan
- November 7 — Let's Play by Mongie
- November 7 — 1000 by Chuck Brown and Sanford Greene
- December 5 — War Cry by Dean Haspiel

=== Webcomics ended ===
- The Adventures of Dr. McNinja by Christopher Hastings, 2004 – 2017
- Multiplex by Gordon McAlpin, 2005 – 2017
- The Dreamland Chronicles by Scott Christian Sava, 2006 – 2017
- Octopus Pie by Meredith Gran, 2007 – 2017
- Mob Psycho 100 by One, 2012 – 2017
- Snarlbear by Natalie Riess, 2012 – 2017
- Cheese in the Trap by Soonkki
- unTouchable by massstar, 2014 – 2017
- 17776 by Jon Bois, 2017 – 2017
