= Dr. Frost (TV series) =

- Promotional poster
- Genre: Crime; Thriller; Mystery
- Based on: Dr. Frost by Lee Jong-beom
- Written by: Heo Ji-young
- Directed by: Sung Yong-il
- Starring: Song Chang-eui; Jung Eun-chae; Lee Yoon-ji; Sung Ji-ru; Choi Jung-woo
- Country of origin: South Korea
- Original language: Korean
- No. of episodes: 10

Production
- Production location: Korea
- Production company: Studio 605

Original release
- Network: OCN
- Release: November 23, 2014 – February 1, 2015

Dr. Frost (Korean: 닥터 프로스트) is a South Korean television series based on Lee Jong-beom's webtoon of the same name that was first serialized on web portal Naver in 2011. Starring Song Chang-eui in the title role, it aired on OCN from November 23, 2014, to February 1, 2015, on Sundays at 23:00 for 10 episodes.

== Plot ==
Baek Nam-bong is a handsome, thirty-four year old professor of psychology by day and bartender by night, and he is nicknamed "Dr. Frost" because of his premature white hair. He sustained a frontal lobe injury in his childhood, which heightened his reasoning centers to genius-level, but left him unable to feel empathy, love, sorrow and other emotional responses.

Nam-bong also volunteers at the university's counseling center, where he meets the cheerful and meddlesome Yoon Sung-ah, who's on the fast track to graduate early, and who becomes his teaching assistant. Nam-bong has a love-hate relationship with his colleague Song Sun, a professor with a cold personality who was also his classmate in university. His mentor is Chun Sang-won, the head of the department of psychology. Given his excellent deductive skills, Nam-bong officially (and unofficially) assists veteran detective Nam Tae-bong in solving crimes.

== Cast ==
- Song Chang-eui as Baek Nam-bong
- Jung Eun-chae as Yoon Sung-ah
- Lee Yoon-ji as Song Sun
- Sung Ji-ru as Nam Tae-bong
- Choi Jung-woo as Chun Sang-won
- Lee Hee-jin as Yoo Anna/Sung-hye
- Yoon Jong-hoon as Kang Jin-wook
- Im Kang-sung as Kim Jung-hoon
- Kim Ga-young as Da-rae
- Mu Jin-sung as Young-ho
- Yoo Gun as Bae Doo-han
- Kim Pub-lae as Park Do-chul
- Lee Si-won as Song Sul (Song Sun's younger sister)
- Song Jong-ho as Moon Sung-hyun
  - Choi Soo-han as young Moon Sung-hyun
- Seo Yi-an as Park In-young
- Cha Joo-young as Lee Ji-hye
- Park Sun-cheon as Orphanage director
- Joo Ho-min
- Ha Il-kwon
- Lee Jong-beom
- Seok Woo
- Choi Woo-shik as Kim Jung-hoon

== Ratings ==
In the table below, the blue numbers represent the lowest ratings and the red numbers represent the highest ratings.

Ep.	Original broadcast date	AGB Nielsen
1	November 23, 2014	1.8%
2	November 30, 2014	1.4%
3	December 7, 2014	1.6%
4	December 14, 2014	1.0%
5	December 21, 2014	0.8%
6	January 4, 2015	0.8%
7	January 11, 2015	0.8%
8	January 18, 2015	0.9%
9	January 25, 2015	1.1%
10	February 1, 2015	0.6%
Average		1.1%
