= Nawlz =

NAWLZ is a 24-episode cyberpunk adventure webcomic created by interactive designer and illustrator Stu Campbell, also known as Sutu. The comic is designed for interactive storytelling, combining interactivity, animation, music and text. The comic first launched in late 2008 and was followed by an iPad format in 2011. The comic story follows Harley Chambers as he navigates through the city of Nawlz, a futuristic city full of overlaying virtual realities, mind-altering drugs and a myriad of techno cultures.

== Format ==
The format of NAWLZ is experimental. Traditional comic panels have been replaced by multifaceted animated frames which work on a panoramic, interactive digital canvas. Digital Comics. On popular platforms such as ComiXology user Interface functionality allows readers to zoom in on panels or select Guided View option to read the comic pages panel by panel. NAWLZ has a horizontal digital scroll instead.

The format has also won the comic an FWA award and a WEBBY award.

== Story ==
The metropolis of NAWLZ is a sprawling, yet claustrophobic city and the comic’s namesake. It depicts a world in the future with its focus on youth culture.. Technology is incredibly advanced causing reality to be augmented with digital overlays and multi-sensory interactive experiences. The reader follows Harley Chambers, a cyber graffiti artist ‘casting’ his ‘sleeper real’ to cover the city. A ‘real’ is a personal channel for broadcasting imagination in the form of digital interactive art, animation and sound design. Harley’s real is based on a recurring dream from his childhood. His dream inspired artwork covers most of Nawlz City. Harley encounters a Real disturbingly like his own and causes him to question who is behind it. He sets out to discover who is hijacking and altering his vision. He moves through the story getting harassed by increasingly disturbing and bizarre Reals. Readers move with him into a world where Harley feels the need to push the limits of mind control with hallucinogenic drugs, surgical upgrades and experimental software, but how long before the boundary between his imagination and his reality is dissolved forever?

== Series ==
The NAWLZ universe, story, illustration and colouring are by Sutu, with main console programming by Wayne Harris. Sound designers and musicians include Jordan King, Lhasa Mencur, Joel Edmondson, Matt Tierney and Fredrik Stolpe.

Season 1 - Distortion Reigns Supreme

- Issue 01 – "On the Clip Trail"
- Issue 02 – "Sleeper Background"
- Issue 03 – "28 Clips in the trip"
- Issue 04 – "Hail the Jon"
- Issue 05 – "Nawlz Recap, Clip #28″
- Issue 06 – "Master Chameleon"
- Issue 07 – "In Search of the Lotus Seed"
- Issue 08 – "The Life Real"
- Issue 09 – "Skyman's Hand"
- Issue 10 – "Elixir"
- Issue 11 – "Gracelands"
- Issue 12 – "Walking Limo"
- Issue 13 – "Seeds"
- Issue 14 – "Distortion Reigns Supreme

Season 2 - Real Werld Information Breakdown

- Issue 1 – "Real Werld Information Breakdown"
- Issue 2 – "Rapid Form Social Blitzkrieg"
- Issue 3 – "Skyman Seeks"
- Issue 4 – "Raw Analogue"
- Issue 5 – "Latenight Paranoia Engine"
- Issue 6 – "They’re Watching"
- Issue 7 – "Grey Matter"
- Issue 8 – "Grimshaws"
- Issue 9 – "Beyond"
- Issue 10 – "Custard"
