= 2009 in webcomics =

Notable events of 2009 in webcomics.

== Events ==
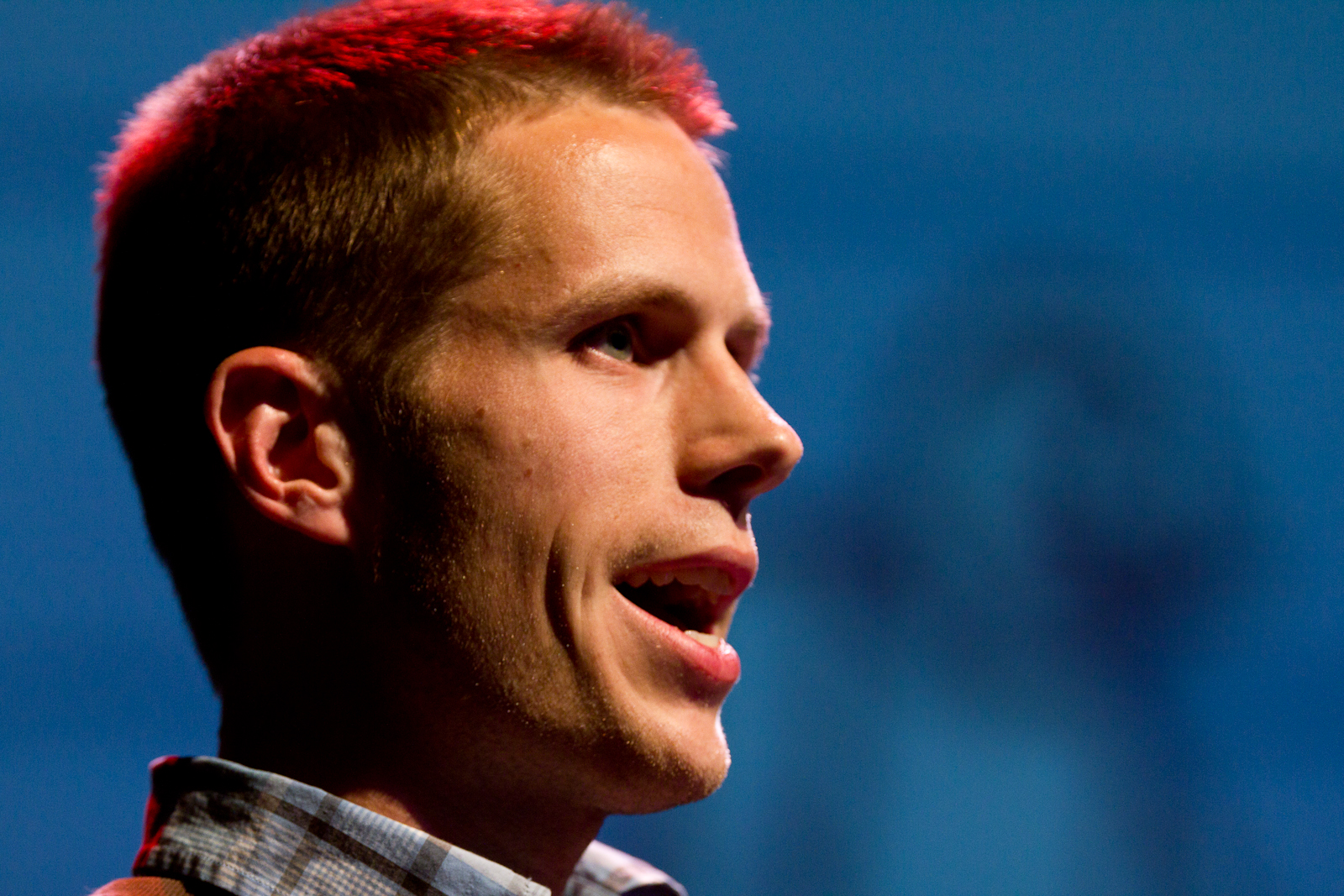
By 2010, Matthew Inman's The Oatmeal received an average of 4.6 million visitors per month.

- New England Webcomics Weekend was first held March 20–22.

=== Awards ===
- Eisner Awards, "Best Webcomic" won by Carla Speed McNeil's Finder.
- Harvey Awards, "Best Online Comics Work" won by Scott O. Brown, Steve Ellis, and David Gallaher's High Moon.
- Ignatz Awards, "Outstanding Online Comic" won by Cayetano Garza's Year of the Rat.
- Joe Shuster Awards, "Outstanding WebComic Creator/Creative Team" won by Cameron Stewart, creator of Sin Titulo.
- Cybils Awards for Young Adult Books, "Graphic Novel" won by Tom Siddell's Gunnerkrigg Court: Orientation.
- Hugo Award for Best Graphic Story won by Kaja Foglio, Phil Foglio, and Cheyenne Wright's Girl Genius, Volume 8.

=== Webcomics started ===
- January 14 — Forming by Jesse Moynihan
- January 21 — Doc and Raider by Sean Martin
- February 1 — Amalgam by Maya Zankoul
- April 13 — Homestuck by Andrew Hussie
- April 18 — Kiwi Blitz by Mary Cagle
- July 13 — One-Punch Man by One
- July 6 — The Oatmeal by Matthew Inman
- July — Hyperbole and a Half by Allie Brosh
- August 15 — Drive: the scifi comic by Dave Kellett
- September 4 — Guilded Age by T Campbell, Erica Henderson and Phil Khan
- September 21 — Bad Machinery by John Allison
- October 31 — Death-Day by Sam Hiti and Joseph Midthun
- October — La Morté Sisters by Tony Trov, Johnny Zito and Christine Larsen
- December 25 — Axe Cop by Malachai Nicolle and Ethan Nicolle
- Countryballs by Falco
- Fok_It by Joonas Rinta-Kanto
- Writer J by Oh Seong-dae

=== Webcomics ended ===
- The Pain – When Will It End? by Tim Kreider, 2000 – 2009
- Scary Go Round by John Allison, 2002 – 2009
- Ugly Hill by Paul Southworth, 2005 – 2009
- Problem Sleuth by Andrew Hussie, 2008 – 2009
- Oh My Gods! by Shivian Montar Balaris, 2002 – 2009
- DAR by Erika Moen, 2003 – 2009
