= Death day (disambiguation) =

Death day is the anniversary of the day on which an individual died.

Death day may also refer to:

- Death-Day, a webcomic
- "Death Day", a song by Alien Ant Farm from Anthology

== See also ==
- "Date of Death", an episode of Fear The Walking Dead
- "Day of Death", an episode of The Rookie
- Day of the Dead
- Happy Death Day (disambiguation)
- Memorial service (Orthodox), the custom observed in Orthodox Christianity
