= 2008 in webcomics =

Notable events of 2008 in webcomics.

== Events ==
- The website of Plan Nine Publishing went down.

=== Awards ===
- Web Cartoonist's Choice Awards, "Outstanding Comic" won by Phil and Kaja Foglio's Girl Genius.
- Ignatz Awards, "Outstanding Online Comic" won by Chris Onstad's Achewood.
- Eagle Awards, "Favourite Web-Based Comic" won by Rich Burlew's The Order of the Stick.
- Eisner Awards, "Best Digital Comic" won by Joss Whedon and Fábio Moon's Sugarshock!.
- Harvey Awards, "Best Online Comics Work" won by Nicholas Gurewitch' The Perry Bible Fellowship.
- Joe Shuster Awards, "Outstanding Webcomic Creator" won by Ryan Sohmer and Lar DeSouza (Least I Could Do and Looking for Group).
- The Weblog Awards, "Best Comic Strip" won by Randall Munroe's xkcd.

=== Webcomics started ===
- January 1 — Hitlercito by Tormentas and Alejandro Cavallazzi
- January 22 — Yehuda Moon and the Kickstand Cyclery by Rick Smith
- February — Welcome to Convenience Store by Ji kangmin
- February 15 — FreakAngels by Warren Ellis and Paul Duffield
- February 27 — Star Wars: The Old Republic, Threat of Peace by Rob Chestney and Alex Sanchez
- February — Garfield Minus Garfield by Dan Walsh
- March 1 — The Black Cherry Bombshells by Tony Trov and Johnny Zito
- March 10 — Problem Sleuth by Andrew Hussie
- April 1 — Truth Serum by Jon Adams
- April 23 — Super Effective by Scott Ramsoomair
- May 16 — Ménage à 3 by Gisele Lagace and Dave Lumsdon
- June 13 — Brawl in the Family by Matthew Taranto
- July 26 — Oglaf by Trudy Cooper and Doug Bayne
- July — Order of Tales by Evan Dahm
- July — XDragoon by Felipe Marcantonio
- September 4 — Gunshow by KC Green
- September 21 — Johnny Wander by Ananth Panagariya and Yuko Ota
- October 19 — Sandra and Woo by Oliver Knörzer and Puri Andini
- November 1 — Sister Claire
- December 27 — The Meek by Der-Shing Helmer

=== Webcomics ended ===
- Ozy and Millie by D. C. Simpson, 1998 – 2008
- Casey and Andy by Andy Weir, 2001 – 2008
- The original Cheshire Crossing by Andy Weir, 2006 – 2008
- minus by Ryan Armand, 2006 – 2008
- Rice Boy by Evan Dahm, 2006 – 2008
- A.D.: New Orleans After the Deluge by Josh Neufeld, 2007 – 2008

=== Notable publications ===
- June 2 — Loss by Tim Buckley
