= Wind Breaker =

Wind Breaker may refer to:

- Wind Breaker (manhwa), a 2013 South Korean manhwa series author and illustrated by Yongseok Jo
- Wind Breaker (manga), a 2021 Japanese manga series written by Satoru Nii

== See also ==
- Windbreaker, a jacket
- Windbreaker (disambiguation)
