= 2007 in webcomics =

Notable events of 2007 in webcomics.

== Events ==
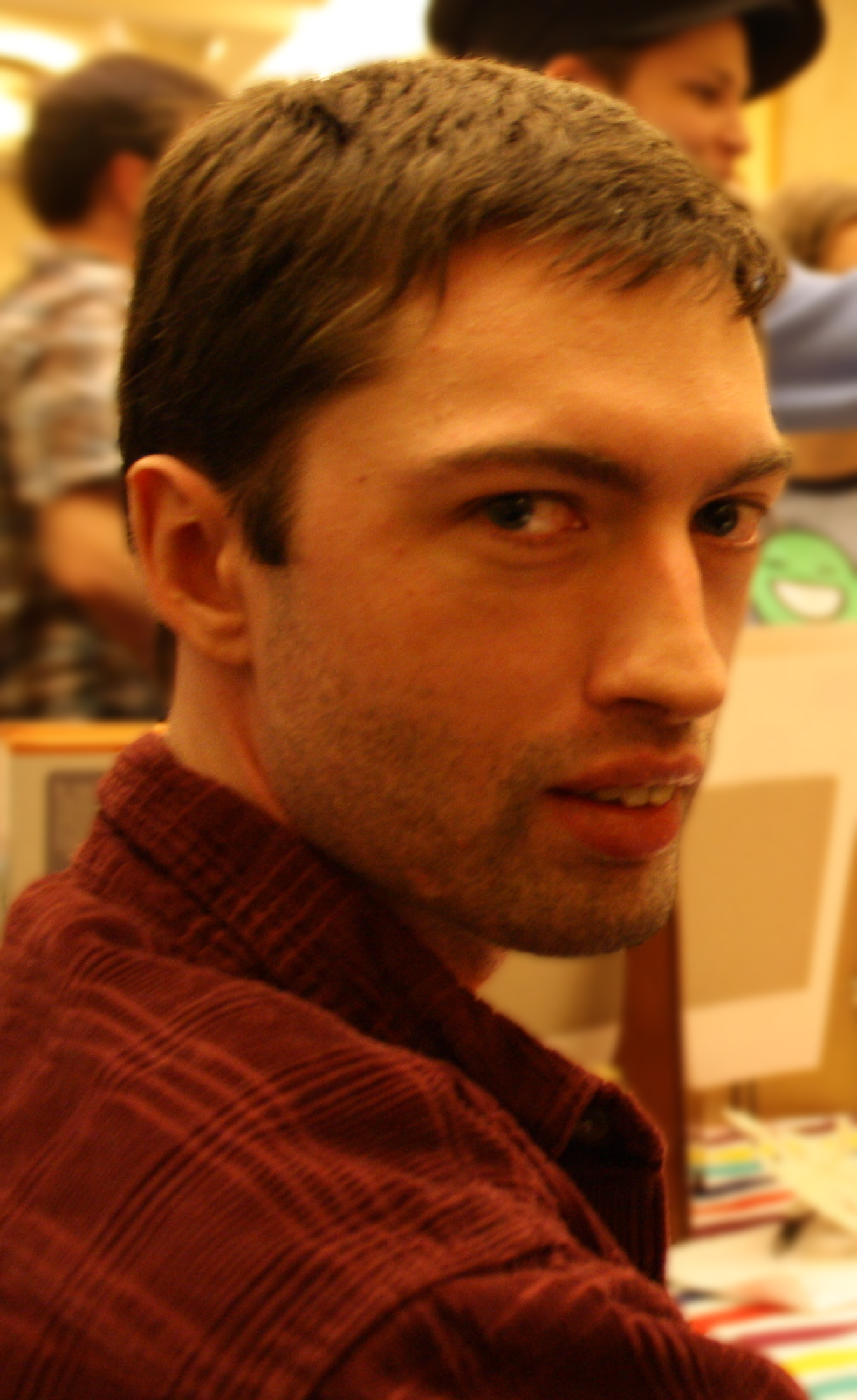
Andrew Hussie launched MS Paint Adventures in 2007.

- Zuda Comics, an imprint of DC Comics, launches on October 30.
- Marvel Digital Comics Unlimited, an online archive of Marvel Comics, launches on November 13.
- Cloud-based comics platform ComiXology launches.

=== Awards ===
- Web Cartoonist's Choice Awards, "Outstanding Comic" won by Nicholas Gurewitch's Perry Bible Fellowship.
- Clickburg Webcomic Awards, won by Rob van Barneveld, Martijn van Santen, and others.
- Eagle Awards, "Favourite Web-Based Comic" won by Jerry Holkins and Mike Krahulik's Penny Arcade.
- Eisner Awards, "Best Digital Comic" won by Steve Purcell's Sam & Max: The Big Sleep.
- Harvey Awards, "Best Online Comics Work" won by Nicholas Gurewitch's Perry Bible Fellowship.
- Ignatz Awards, "Outstanding Online Comics" won by Chris Onstad's Achewood.
- Joe Shuster Awards, "Outstanding WebComic Creator/Creative Team" won by Dan Kim, for April & May & June, Kanami & Penny Tribute.
- The Weblog Awards, "Best Comic Strip" won by Randall Munroe's xkcd.
- ENnies, "Best Regalia" won by Rich Burlew's The Order of the Stick: No Cure for the Paladin Blues.

=== Webcomics started ===
- January 1 — A.D.: New Orleans After the Deluge by Josh Neufeld
- January 4 — Create a Comic Project by John Baird
- March 2 — Galaxion by Tara Tallan
- March 18 — Sugar Bits by Vinson Ngo
- May 14 — Octopus Pie by Meredith Gran
- June 3 — MS Paint Adventures by Andrew Hussie
- June 20 — The Abominable Charles Christopher by Karl Kerschl
- July — Masque of the Red Death by Wendy Pini
- September 7 — Eben 07 by Eben Burgoon and D.Bethel
- September 27 — The Phoenix Requiem by Sarah Ellerton
- October 29 — Grey Legacy by Wayne Wise and Fred Wheaton
- October 30 — High Moon by David Gallaher, Steve Ellis, and Scott O Brown
- December 11 — Don't Forget To Validate Your Parking by Mike Le
- December 13 — The Night Owls by Peter and Bobby Timony
- Hark! A Vagrant by Kate Beaton
- Ma vie est tout à fait fascinante by Pénélope Bagieu
- Noblesse by Son Je-ho and Lee Kwang-su
- Hori-san to Miyamura-kun by HERO
- pictures for sad children by Simone Veil
- Rage comics
- Sin Titulo by Cameron Stewart
- Sugarshock! by Joss Whedon
- Subnormality by Winston Rowntree

=== Webcomics ended ===
- Art Comics Daily by Bebe Williams, 1995 – 2007
- Polymer City Chronicles (online) by Chris Morrison, 1995 – 2007
- Bruno by Christopher Baldwin, 1996 – 2007
- Bob and George, by David Anez, 2000 – 2007
- Inverloch by Sarah Ellerton, 2003 – 2007
- Starslip Crisis by Kristofer Straub, 2005 – 2007
