= 2022 in webcomics =

Notable events of 2022 in webcomics.

== Events ==
=== Awards ===
- Eisner Awards, "Best Webcomic" won by Rachel Smythe's Lore Olympus
- Harvey Awards, "Digital Book of the Year" won by Rachel Smythe's Lore Olympus
- Ignatz Awards, "Outstanding Online Comic" won by Mars Heyward's Ride or Die
- Next Manga Award, "Web Manga" won by Jinushi's Smoking Behind the Supermarket with You

=== Webcomics started ===
- January 15 — Dark Moon: The Blood Altar by Hybe
- March 9 — Smoking Behind the Supermarket with You by Jinushi
- April 10 — The Guy She Was Interested in Wasn't a Guy at All by Sumiko Arai
- April 11 — Goodbye, Eri (one-shot) by Tatsuki Fujimoto
- April 20 — Marriagetoxin by Joumyaku and Mizuki Yoda
- June 24 — Kirio Fan Club by Ponchan Chikyū no Osakana
- July 4 — Just Listen to the Song (one-shot) by Tatsuki Fujimoto and Oto Toda
- December 11 — Damedol and the Only Fan in the World by Kirishimo
- December 12 — 3rd Voice by Evan Dahm

=== Webcomics ended ===
- Everyday Host by Nimo Gotō, 2020–2022
- Takopi's Original Sin by Taizan 5, 2021–2022
- Tales of the Unusual by Oh Seong-dae, 2013–2022
- The Boxer by Jung Ji-Hoon, 2019–2022
- The Girl Downstairs by Min Song-a, 2019–2022
- The God of High School by Yongje Park, 2011–2022
- Vattu by Evan Dahm, 2010-2022
