= Windbreaker (disambiguation) =

A windbreaker is a thin jacket.

Windbreaker may also refer to:

- Windbreaker, or windbreak, a sheet of material supported by poles to protect from the wind; see Windbreak
- Windbreaker, a Transformers action figure
- "Windbreaker", a song by Northlane from their 2013 album Singularity
- Trophy (countermeasure), a.k.a. "Windbreaker", an active protection system (APS) for armored fighting vehicles

== See also ==
- Wind Breaker (disambiguation)
- Windbreak
