= Paper bag (disambiguation) =

Paper bag is a container, made of paper.

Paper bag may also refer to:

- "Paper Bag", a song by Fiona Apple from her 1999 album When the Pawn...
- "Paper Bag", a song by Goldfrapp from their 2000 album Felt Mountain
- Paper Bag Records, a Canadian independent record label, founded in 2002
- Brown Paperbag, a 2016 webcomic
