= Webtoon Singer =

South Korean reality competition show

- Promotional poster
- Hangul: 웹툰싱어
- RR: Weptunsingeo
- MR: Wept'unsingŏ
- Genre: Reality competition
- Directed by: Hwang Sung-ho
- Starring: Choi Min-ho; Yoo Se-yoon; Jang Do-yeon
- Country of origin: South Korea
- Original language: Korean
- No. of episodes: 8

Original release
- Network: TVING
- Release: February 17 – April 7, 2023

Webtoon Singer (Korean: 웹툰싱어) is a South Korean reality competition musical show created by TVING. It is based on the Naver's Webtoon. The series aired on TVING on February 17 to April 7, 2023, with each episode being released every Friday at 16:00 (KST).

== Cast ==
- Choi Min-ho
- Yoo Se-yoon
- Jang Do-yeon

== Production and release ==
In the end of 2022, TVING's Webtoon Singer was scheduled to be released in 2023.

The series premiered on February 17, 2023, and performed as a K-pop combines 16 webtoons with an immersive extended reality technology, including: The God of High School, All of Us Are Dead, Dr. Frost, Romance 101, Jeong Nyeon, Love Revolution, Tomorrow, Whale Star: The Gyeongseong Mermaid, Wind Breaker, The Girl Downstairs, Unholy Blood, Nine Us, Byeolyisam Shop, Knitting Room, Hive, and Feeding Dad.
