= Happy Death Day (disambiguation) =

Happy Death Day is a 2017 American horror film.

It may also refer to:

- Happy Deathday, an album by the Saddolls
- "Happy Death Day" (song), a song by Xdinary Heroes
- "Happy Death Day" (Ghosts), a 2019 TV episode

== See also ==
- Death day (disambiguation)
