= Hitlercito =

Spanish webcomic

- Author(s): Alejandro Cavallazzi, Tormentas
- Current status/schedule: Monday
- Launch date: 2008-01-01 https://hitlercito.blogspot.com/2008/01/hitlercito-1.html
- Publisher(s): Pelafustan comics
- Genre(s): Humor

Hitlercito is a Spanish webcomic written and drawn by Alejandro Cavallazzi and Tormentas. The comic is a spoof on historical conquerors, and has been reviewed in the Mexican newspaper Reforma, in an article of the student newspaper 8/ochenta of the Universidad Iberoamericana, in an article in the online magazine TVA, and in nationwide magazine Emeequis. It was also listed as an example of a webcomic in the weekly magazine Milenio. Hitlercito has recently been published in the magazine Replicante and the comic strip magazine ¡#$%&! Cómics from Monterrey.

== History ==
Hitlercito was first published online in October 2005, but was dropped by the authors after a couple of months. The project was restarted in January 2008. After a couple of months, the authors began another webcomic, Perro, gato y ardilla. In May 2008 Hitlercito began appearing regularly in the bimonthly publication Replicante.

== Content ==
The main character is Hitlercito, a small version of Hitler obsessed with world domination. His lack of success has been a constant in the story. The strip draws heavily on historical jokes and anachronisms. The other main characters are Napoleon and Julius Caesar. At different times, they may be supportive or competitive, depending on the story line.

Many strips are based on historical facts, but Hitlercito also deals with modern-day issues such as Windows Vista criticism, outsourcing, and casual dressing at work. In addition, the title of almost every strip is written in an academic style, in a manner reminiscent of Genshiken. In some of the titles, references are made to political science, philosophy, and other subjects with themes such as game theory, Max Weber, Nicomachean Ethics, the Lebenswelt, and Latin mottos.

Although World War II is mentioned, due to the light humor tone of the strip there are no references to Hitler's racist ideology or to the Nazi holocaust.

== Characters ==
Hitlercito's characters are mainly historical. This is a complete list.

=== Main characters ===
Hitlercito is spoof of Adolf Hitler. Although there are many similarities between him and the historical Hitler, it is more accurate to consider him a construct. The character behaves in an extremely dignified manner which contrasts with his lack of success and his failure in obtaining respect from his peers.

Julius Caesar is based on the Roman general and dictator, and serves as the comic relief. He frequently misunderstands the situations, and keeps a cheerful mood even when inappropriate.

Napoleon hasn't spoken yet, instead keeping a quiet and noble attitude.

=== Secondary Characters ===
Alexander the Great was found in Egypt by the main characters, and is vain and successful. His continuous mentioning of efficiency and productivity are examples of office humor.

Cleopatra made some appearances while the characters were on Egypt. She is portrayed as bad tempered and capricious, particularly with Julius Caesar, with whom she has a relationship.

Chicken was originally used as a phony opponent by Hitlercito in a debate. His plan failed when the chicken won the debate without speaking. The chicken began gaining power in an unexpected way, in a similar way than the Animaniacs' character Chicken Boo.

=== Minor characters ===
When the main characters go to what seems to be an expensive restaurant, a ceremonious waiter serves them. Cameo appearances include the fox from the Little Prince (confused with the Desert Fox), and Prince Charles.
