= Fantome-Stein =

- Logo of the website
- Author: Beka Duke
- Current status/schedule: Last updated March 2023
- Launch date: May 2015

Fantome-Stein (Note: Sources variously write the title as "Fantome-Stein", FantomeStein", and "Fantomestein".) is a webcomic by Beka Duke. It is based on the premise that Frankenstein's monster did not die but went on to become The Phantom of the Opera.

== Premise and development ==
In Fantome-Stein, Frankenstein's monster did not die but went on to become The Phantom of the Opera. The story follows Frankenstein's monster and his struggle to find humanity and to win the affections of Christine Daae. The comic draws inspiration from Israeli and Middle-Eastern culture.

The comic was initially published on Tumblr but now has its own website. The comic was also published on Tapas, but Duke removed it from that site after Tapas changed its terms of service. The last update to the comic was in March 2023, after a three-year hiatus.

== Reception ==
Fantom-Stein was a runner up in ComicsAlliance's "Best New Webcomic of 2015". In announcing the result, ComicsAlliance writer Charlotte Finn said that the comic "is drenched in atmosphere, with thick scratchy inks, bold lettering with perfectly chosen fonts, and desaturated colors wringing the operatic melodrama for all that it's worth."

== Author ==
Fantome-Stein is created by Beka Duke. As of 2015, Duke was attending Southern Arkansas University, studying Game and Animation Design and Communication Design. She was encouraged to create a comic book by a professor. Fantome-Stein counted towards her class credits. Duke was 23 as of January 2016, and grew up mostly in Israel.
