= Stu Campbell =

Australian artist

Stuart Campbell (born 1981), producing work under the name Sutu, is Australian artist and director who works with digital media. He has produced interactive webcomics, augmented reality stories, virtual reality films and virtual concerts. He lives and works in Los Angeles.

== Career ==
Campbell often locates his projects and presentations among isolated populations and involves the residents creating interactive web content including Neomad, a digital interactive comic series created for the iPad in collaboration with the community of Roebourne in northern western Australia. Neomad was adapted as a live-action television series in Australia and has inspired the Neo-learning curriculum in Australia.

== Awards ==
- 2016 Gold Ledger Award- NEOMAD, print edition.
- 2016 Webby Honoree for best NetArt - These Memories Won't Last
- 2015 Winner of Air15 Artist in Residency in Vienna, Austria
- 2015 Winner 2016 Neo Future Ateles Artist in Residency, Finland
- 2014 Atom Awards Best Documentary – Short Form ‘How do we get to space? The story of the Love Punks & the Satellite Sisters’ (Big hArt – directed by Chynna Campbell)
- 2014 Best of 2014 award, Village Voice – The Gatecrashers graphic novel
- 2014 Best of 2014 award, Bleeding Cool – The Gatecrashers graphic novel
- 2013 Japan Media Arts Festival – Jury Selection – Ngurrara
- 2013 ATOM Award – Best Game/Multimedia Production – NEOMAD
- 2012 Webby Honoree – Experimental and Innovation (Handheld Devices)
- 2010 SXSW Interactive Design Award – Finalist for Nawlz
- 2009 Australian ATOM Awards Finalist Best Multimedia for Nawlz
- 2008 Australian Desktop Create Awards Silver Prize for Best Digital Media
- 2007 AIMIA Best Cultural Interactive Development Award for NMA Harvest Scroll 3
- 2006 Basefield Design Competition, Winner Best New Artist Category
- 2004 Melbourne Art Director Awards, Bronze Medal for Best Multimedia Animation
- 2004 Melbourne Art Director Awards, Bronze Medal for Best CD Rom/DVD

== Works ==
- Nawlz- 24 episodes
- Modern Polaxis
- Neomad
- These Memories Won't Last
- The Ocean is Broken
- The Gatecrashers- 9 current issues
- Krysalis
- Exponius Museum
- SUTUWERLD
