= JL8 =

American superhero webcomic

- Author: Yale Stewart
- Website: http://jl8comic.tumblr.com
- Current status/schedule: Ongoing
- Launch date: 26 November 2011

JL8 is a webcomic by Yale Stewart based on the characters of DC Comics' Justice League. Having started in 2011 under the title Little League, the webcomic presents the members of the Justice League as 8-year-old children. Stewart has used JL8 to raise funds for charities, and the webcomic has been positively received by critics.

Yale Stewart, cartoonist, at Dragon Con in Atlanta Ga September 6 2026

== Overview ==
The webcomic JL8 features the various major characters of DC Comics' Justice League, reimagined as 8-year-old children. The art style has been compared to that of a 1980s Saturday-morning cartoon and the designs of Art Adams' X-Babies. The characters do not act much like their counterparts from The New 52, and the webcomic has been characterized as "fanfiction". Michael May of Comic Book Resources stated that the webcomic is akin to Tiny Titans, but while Titans emulates the gag-focused format of Archie and Harvey Comics, JL8 has more in common with newspaper strips: each comic has a joke, but also contributes to a story arc.

The story arcs in JL8 revolve around Bruce Wayne (Batman), Clark Kent (Superman), Princess Diana (Wonder Woman), Barry Allen (The Flash), Karen Starr (Power Girl), J'onn J'onzz (Martian Manhunter), and Hal Jordan (Green Lantern), all in elementary school. The characters are presented as a group of friends, and the webcomic is "for all ages".

== Development ==
Yale Stewart started the webcomic Little League in November 2011. In the second half of 2012, Stewart renamed Little League to its current title, JL8, and moved the webcomic to a different URL. During this period, Stewart also included a cameo of author Neil Gaiman in his webcomic.

Beginning in May 2023, Stewart began publishing single panel one-shot comics called JL8: Monday Minis. These comics are not part of the main canon of JL8, but instead feature the main characters in various (typically seasonally appropriate) activities.

== Charity and monetization ==
After Typhoon Haiyan made land in the Philippines in 2013, Stewart was among a few webcomic creators to fund money for those displaced by the disaster, as a large portion of his fanbase lives in the country.

Stewart sells original artwork and prints of his webcomic despite a possible violation of DC Comics' copyright and trademarks, as the company has turned a blind eye to him for a long time. Capstone Publishers even hired Stewart to create official Superman children's books.

== Reception ==
IGN named JL8 its best webcomic of 2012, Paste Magazine listed it among its top webcomics of 2014, and PC Magazine listed it among its top webcomics of 2015. JL8 was nominated for a Harvey Award in 2014.
