= God of Bath =

South Korean webtoon by Ha Il-kwon

목욕의 신 RR: Mogyogui sin MR: Mogyogŭi sin
- Genre: Comedy, Drama
- Author: Ha Il-kwon
- Publisher: Jaemijooe
- Magazine: Naver Webtoon
- Original run: 2012
- Collected volumes: 3

God of Bath (Korean: 목욕의 신) is a South Korean manhwa series written and illustrated by Ha Il-kwon. Started on July 14, 2011, this webtoon manhwa was released on Naver Webtoon. The print release of the first volume of God of Bath was released on May 8, 2012. The webtoon was to be adapted into a feature film in 2014, though the film never premiered.
