= Star Wars: The Old Republic (comics) =

Comic book series

Star Wars: The Old Republic is an American comic book series set in the Star Wars universe. The series is published by Dark Horse Comics. The first two arcs of the series were originally posted online for reading at Star Wars: The Old Republic's official site. They then were published by Dark Horse Comics in a comic book series.

It is set in the Old Republic timeframe in the Star Wars universe.

== Synopsis ==
=== Threat of Peace ===
Threat of Peace is set in the year 3,653 BBY (Before the Battle of Yavin). It is written by Rob Chestney, and penciled by Alex Sanchez with color by Michael Atiyeh. It was originally released online in 27 parts, divided up into 3 acts. It was later put in print by Dark Horse Comics.

=== Blood of the Empire ===
Blood of the Empire is set in the year 3,678 BBY. It is written by Alexander Freed, and penciled by David Ross with color by Michael Atiyeh. It was originally released online in 12 parts, divided up into 3 acts. It was later put in print by Dark Horse Comics.

=== The Lost Suns ===
The Lost Suns is set in the year 3,643 BBY. It is written by Alexander Freed, and penciled by David Ross with color by Michael Atiyeh. Unlike the other two arcs, it was not published online. Instead, it was published in print by Dark Horse Comics.

== Issues ==
- The Old Republic #1: Threat of Peace, Part 1 of 3 (Color 40 Pages, Jul 2010) $2.99
- The Old Republic #2: Threat of Peace, Part 2 of 3 (Color 40 Pages, Aug 2010) $2.99
- The Old Republic #3: Threat of Peace, Part 3 of 3 (Color 40 Pages, Sep 2010) $2.99
- The Old Republic #4: Blood of the Empire, Part 1 of 3 (Color 40 Pages, Oct 2010) $2.99
- The Old Republic #5: Blood of the Empire, Part 2 of 3 (Color 40 Pages, Nov 2010) $2.99
- The Old Republic #6: Blood of the Empire, Part 3 of 3 (Color 40 Pages, Dec 2010) $2.99
- The Old Republic #7: The Lost Suns, Part 1 of 5 (Color 40 Pages, Jun 2011) $3.50
- The Old Republic #8: The Lost Suns, Part 2 of 5 (Color 40 Pages, Jul 2011) $3.50
- The Old Republic #9: The Lost Suns, Part 3 of 5 (Color 32 Pages, Aug 2011) $3.50
- The Old Republic #10: The Lost Suns, Part 4 of 5 (Color 32 Pages, Sep 2011) $3.50
- The Old Republic #11: The Lost Suns, Part 5 of 5 (Color 32 Pages, Oct 2011) $3.50

== Trade Paperbacks ==
- Threat of Peace...........(#s 1-3) - $15.99
- Blood of the Empire.....(#s 4-6) - $15.99
- The Lost Suns.............(#s 7-11) - $18.99
