= These Memories Won't Last =

- A panel of These Memories Won't Last
- Author: Stu Campbell
- Website: memories.sutueatsflies.com
- Current status/schedule: One-shot
- Launch date: December 2015

These Memories Won't Last is a 2015 webcomic created by Stu Campbell. The infinite canvas webcomic written in HTML5 tells the story of Campbell's grandfather suffering from Alzheimer's disease. These Memories Won't Last is deliberately created to work with current web browser software and will likely not be readable with future technologies. The webcomic was nominated for an Eisner Award.

== Content ==
In These Memories Won't Last, Stu Campbell describes his experiences from when his grandfather was suffering from Alzheimer's disease. In the webcomic, Campbell recounts how he spent parts of his youth listening to his grandfather's childhood memories and old war stories, before going on to describe how these stories began to fade as his grandfather's condition developed. As the reader scrolls down the page, earlier panels begin to disappear making re-reading the webcomic difficult, mimicking the effects of the disease. Campbell tells mournful anecdotes of his grandfather experiencing severe paranoia and calling him by his cousin's name.

The webcomic was created in HTML5 in order to work on web browsers and features a large amount of subtle visual effects. Foggy clouds drift across the screen as the reader scrolls down the page and an atmospheric soundtrack was composed by Lhasa Mencur. A rope twists around the panels of the webcomic, connecting elements of the story. As the grandfather's mind deteriorates, the rope becomes tangled and knotted, ensnaring individual elements of his memory. Some panels and text are crystal clear when these are out of sync, but when the reader scrolls to line them up properly, they get a misty appearance. Scrolling backwards is fruitless, as previous panels become hidden in a white fog.

== Development ==
Campbell created These Memories Won't Last during his stay at Vienna's Air 15 artist residency. In an interview with CNET, Campbell explained that he had been experimenting with incorporating interactive elements in digital comics for a while at that point, in order to find new ways to invoke a feeling for his story. Campbell's previous works Modern Polaxis, Neomad, and Nawlz were similarly enhanced through digital means. The slowly fading panels of These Memories Won't Last were intended to create a sense of urgency to read the story before time runs out.

Campbell wrote his webcomic in part to preserve the memories of his grandfather. Though browser updates have shown to often break the functionalities of the page, Campbell stated that reaching an audience through computers and smart devices was something he deemed important. Campbell said to CNET that he hopes that the story of his grandfather and the digital presentation of his work "shows the fragility of memory and makes us question how we choose to preserve it."

These Memories Won't Last was published in December 2015. Its soundtrack was designed by Lhasa Mencur, and it was programmed by Vitaliy Shirokiy.

== Reception ==
These Memories Won't Last was nominated for an Eisner Award in the "Best Digital/Webcomic" category in 2016. Caitlin Rosberg of Paste Magazine stated that These Memories Won't Last uses motion and music to "ensnare" the reader’s attention and force them to actively engage with the webcomic. Michelle Starr of CNET said that, as a "story of fading memories told in a fading medium," These Memories Won't Last is particularly poignant, asking questions of how stories should be preserved and remembered.

Minna Sundberg of NPR noted that though Cambell's "goofy" art style doesn't seem suited for the melancholy plot at first, the latter actually works really well with the over-exaggerated features and fantastical images. Noting the brittle nature of the work, Sundberg described These Memories Won't Last as a "fragile gem". The Hindu stated in 2018 that the webcomic "offer[s] an experience that cannot be reproduced in print," calling it "a homage to the unique opportunities offered by technology."
