= SandSerif =

2017 webcomic by Sandy

- Author(s): Sandy
- Website: Instagram
- Current status/schedule: Ongoing
- Launch date: June 2017

SandSerif is a brand created by cartoonist, graphic designer and illustrator, Sandy C., which started in June 2017.

== Content ==
SandSerif is a webcomic created by the artist Sandy to express feelings and experiences in his life, through dark and humorous illustrations and cartoon strips. SandSerif features a representation of Sandy as its main character; a young man without a mouth. Most SandSerif strips are drawn in black-and-white, with color only used to imagine a parallel world in which the main character is content.

== Development ==
In an interview with The Hindu, Sandy stated that the title of his webcomic came up as he was playing around with his nick-name and the font style Sans-serif. Sandy wrote that he enjoys being a character and doesn't want to attach his own name to it yet. "The comics are basically projections of myself on paper. It's all autobiographical." Sandy frequently states that he has difficulty expressing himself with words, and wrote that "visuals can always convey more than just words." Sandy draws SandSerif in Adobe Photoshop, using a Wacom tablet

Writing with The Mighty, Sandy stated that he started SandSerif as a "silly little idea for a comic" that he created "for fun". Sandy wrote that his webcomic helps him "express [negative] emotions or talk about a certain situation in my life that I have experienced," and encourages others who live with mental health issues or any regular daily troublesome lives, to express their emotions through art as well.

== Impact ==
Storypick described SandSerif as "an amazing comic collection" 77,000 people follow Sandy on Instagram as of 2019. Sandy has written that he has received many messages from people telling him that his strips resonated with them, and thanking him for creating them. Sandy teamed up with e-commerce website and online artist community Threadless in 2018, in order to sell merchandise.

== External websites ==
- SandSerif Comics on Instagram
- SandSerif on Instagram
- SandSerif Art on Instagram
- Sandserif on Facebook
- Sandserif on Twitter
