= Bugcat Capoo =

Fictional cartoon character

- First appearance: 2014
- Created by: Yara

Bugcat Capoo (Chinese: 貓貓蟲咖波; pinyin: Māomāochóng Kābō), sometimes abbreviated to Capoo, is a cartoon character resembling a chubby blue cat with six legs. He is the namesake and main subject of a webcomic strip on Facebook and Instagram, cartoon clips on YouTube, and stickers on LINE and other social media. He was created by the Taiwanese artist Yara (亞拉; Yàlā) in 2014.

Capoo is described as "a little monster like a cat and like a bug, both violent and cute, who loves to eat meat". The comic depicts him as a cute house pet with an endless hunger for meat and a disdain for vegetables, living together with his owner Lala and the seemingly immortal Dogdog—a large dog possessing uncanny skills in every field—in Lala's house. Much of the comic revolves around everyday situations which explode into absurdity, and often end with Capoo either eating whatever frustrates him, or being comically punished by Lala for his antics.

== Webcomic ==
The comic takes place in a world that is generally grounded in present-day life, but contains various comical features which defy logic and physics, such as sentient everyday objects, different conventions such as buses being replaced with large friendly turtles, and a host of anthropomorphic supporting characters such as the masochistic simultaneously in love with Capoo bunny Tutu, Capoo's sister Mika, and a race of little round creatures resembling young chicks, which are frequently hunted for food by Capoo.

The comic is notable for its juxtaposition of the cute and the macabre, due to Capoo's occasional propensity for violence and the devouring of living beings.

== History ==
Bugcat Capoo started in 2014 as an amateur comic strip drawn by Yara on Bahamut, a popular Taiwanese ACG site. After positive feedback, he published a set of 40 Capoo stickers on the LINE Creators Market in October 2014. The success of these stickers, and rising popularity of the character, led Yara to become a full-time illustrator. After winning the short comic category in the 2015 WEBTOON Original Comic Competition, Bugcat Capoo was serialised as an official LINE WEBTOON comic until March 2020. During the serialisation at LINE, the character became part of various promotional events and materials. Today, the comic is primarily hosted on Facebook, Instagram, and YouTube.

Bugcat Capoo artwork is widely available as stickers on social media platforms like Facebook and LINE. Among sticker creators, Yara was ranked #7 on the LINE Creators Market in 2017, rising to #5 by 2020. Capoo and other characters from the comic have been part of various collaborations with games and companies. The popularity of the character has also spawned a number of businesses selling merchandise and themed services, such as the "Capoo House" store and the "Foam cat cafe" coffee house, both located in Taichung.
