= Fok It =

Finnish comic strip

Fok_It is a Finnish comic strip drawn by Joonas Rinta-Kanto (born 1982) since 2009, whose trademarks include absurdity and omission of the actual punchline. Strips of the comic have been published on Facebook and on the web page of the Helsingin Sanomat Nyt supplement since 2011. There have also been seven collective print albums of the strip.

Rinta-Kanto draws the original drawings of the strip in felt-tip pen, scans them in, and colours the strip by computer.

Ideas of Fok_It strips, originally consisting of three panels, have included for example belt bags and moustaches. The artist himself calls the humour in Fok_It "tired", it can also be described as twisted or outright absurd. At first some characters in the strip resembled each other, which was a coincidence, but the strip has later started featuring different main characters such as Pete and power animals. Current issues and phenomena also feature in the strip. These include for example bakery products for festive occasions such as Christmas pastries or laskiainen buns.

== Power animals ==
Power animals in the strip include:

- Säihkyturpa ("sparkling snout"), a unicorn who saves Monday with a rainbow. Säihkyturpa was one of the first power animals.
- Perjantai-pingviini ("the Friday penguin"), who takes care of entertainment on Friday and serves drinks.
- Salaliitto-sammakko ("the conspiracy frog"), who warns people of lurkers, dangers on the Internet and attempts to monitor individuals, and advises people to wear a tinfoil hat.
- Elämäntaito-etana ("the lifestyle snail"), who advises readers to slow down.
- Keskiviikko-kroko ("the Wednesday crocodile"), who sometimes acts unpredictably.
- Kilokatti ("the kilogram cat"), who likes eating.
- Nöyhtänokka ("stringed beak") the parrot.

The strip sometimes also features other animals such as small birds. On Fridays the characters often have the weekend on their minds.
