= Inkblazers =

International comic platform

Inkblazers.com (formerly MangaMagazine.net) was an international comic platform helping to monetize webcomics and manga. The company had offices in Boston, Massachusetts and Bangkok, Thailand. It was founded in 2011 by Victor Chu and Bancha Dhammarungruang, and received $1 million in seed funding. Inkblazers.com supported artists via paid subscription, merchandise sales, and ads sales. It also offered free online comic and manga hosting without requiring artists to give up rights to their works.

In an interview, co-founder Victor Chu said that the company aimed to provide the technology behind online comics publishing, in terms of hosting, promotion of great titles, monthly sponsorship and print on demand book publishing. The company was more a service provider to independent artists and this sets them apart from other e-comics initiatives.

== Crowdsourcing ==
Inkblazers.com took a crowdsourcing approach to publishing. Key benefits of crowdsourcing drove the company's decisions included:

1. Fan support for authors.
2. Data backing up decisions on marketing and content rights acquisition.
3. More sales resulting from content aggregation.

Furthermore, the website created an environment in which authors and member contributors can interact and share advice as well as an area in which project collaborations become possible.

Inkblazers shut down on February 1, 2015, as the creators could no longer financially support the continuation of the site, causing many members to search for another webcomic site.
