= Bite Maker: The King's Omega =

Japanese manga series

- First tankōbon volume cover

Bite Maker～王様のΩ～ (Baito Mēka ~ Ōsama no Omega ~)
- Genre: Romance; Supernatural; Omegaverse
- Manga
- Written by: Miwako Sugiyama
- Published by: Shogakukan
- English publisher: NA: Seven Seas Entertainment
- Imprint: Flower Comics
- Magazine: &Flower
- Original run: October 5, 2018 – December 2, 2022
- Volumes: 11
- Manga

Bite Maker: AK
- Written by: Miwako Sugiyama
- Published by: Shogakukan
- Imprint: Flower Comics Special
- Magazine: MangaONE; Ura Sunday; Biccomi
- Original run: May 27, 2023 – May 30, 2026
- Volumes: 6

Bite Maker: The King's Omega (Bite Maker～王様のΩ～, Baito Mēka ~ Ōsama no Omega ~) is a Japanese manga series written and illustrated by Miwako Sugiyama. It was serialized in Shogakukan's &Flower web magazine from October 2018 to December 2022.

== Synopsis ==
Nobunaga was born an Alpha, and is therefore desired by everyone. He is intelligent, handsome, and his pheromones exert a powerful attraction on many people around him, who are Betas. However, no one has been able to satisfy him, and he continues his search for the perfect partner. He despises the Betas because they either admire him too much, or become completely captivated by his pheromones, yet cannot satisfy him. Then he meets Noel, an Omega who actually wants to lead a quiet life. They both quickly realize that their roles make them a perfect match. As an Omega, Noel is not so easily influenced by the Alphas. But she actually loves her childhood friend Hiro, and doesn't want to get involved with anyone else.

== Characters ==
Noel Mamezaki (豆崎 のえる, Mamezaki Noeru)
Voiced by: Yurina Amami (voice comic)
Nobunaga Suō (蘇芳 信長, Suō Nobunaga)
Voiced by: Tatsuhisa Suzuki (voice comic)
Hideyoshi Aoni (青丹 秀吉, Aoni Hideyoshi)
Voiced by: Junpei Baba (voice comic)
Yukimura Asagi (浅葱 幸村, Asagi Yukimura)
Voiced by: Yūki Ono (voice comic)
Ran (蘭)
Voiced by: Yuki Sakakihara (voice comic)
Iyo (伊代)
Voiced by: Miki Hase (voice comic)
Hiro (ヒロ)
Voiced by: Aoi Goda (voice comic)
Saru Nonono (野々乃紗瑠, Nonono Saru)
Voiced by: Atsumi Tanezaki (voice comic)
Kotora Mitsunari (小虎三成, Mitsunari Kotora)
Voiced by: Ryōhei Kimura (voice comic)

== Media ==
=== Manga ===
Written and illustrated by Miwako Sugiyama, Bite Maker: The King's Omega was serialized in Shogakukan's &Flower web magazine from October 5, 2018, to December 2, 2022. Its chapters were collected into eleven tankōbon volumes from January 25, 2019, to March 24, 2023. The series is licensed in North America by Seven Seas Entertainment.

A sequel manga, titled Bite Maker: AK, was serialized on Shogakukan's Ura Sunday, MangaONE, and Biccomi websites from May 27, 2023, to May 30, 2026. The sequel's chapters have been collected into six tankōbon volumes released of February 26, 2024, to August 26, 2026.

==== Volumes ====
No.	Original release date	Original ISBN	North American release date	North American ISBN
1	January 25, 2019	978-4-09-870332-6	May 25, 2021	978-1-64827-117-5
2	June 26, 2019	978-4-09-870445-3	August 3, 2021	978-1-64827-275-2
3	October 25, 2019	978-4-09-870532-0	November 9, 2021	978-1-64827-366-7
4	February 26, 2020	978-4-09-870755-3; 978-4-09-943061-0 (LE)	April 19, 2022	978-1-63858-157-4
5	July 27, 2020	978-4-09-871058-4; 978-4-09-943068-9 (LE)	August 2, 2022	978-1-63858-267-0
6	December 10, 2020	978-4-09-871152-9; 978-4-09-943078-8 (LE)	December 20, 2022	978-1-63858-711-8
7	April 26, 2021	978-4-09-871301-1; 978-4-09-943087-0 (LE)	April 4, 2023	978-1-63858-886-3
8	September 24, 2021	978-4-09-871397-4	July 18, 2023	978-1-68579-731-7
9	February 25, 2022	978-4-09-871568-8	October 31, 2023	978-1-68579-621-1
10	August 26, 2022	978-4-09-871702-6	February 27, 2024	979-8-88843-335-5
11	March 24, 2023	978-4-09-871870-2; 978-4-09-943123-5 (LE)	July 9, 2024	979-8-88843-662-2

==== Bite Maker: AK ====
No.	Japanese release date	Japanese ISBN
1	February 26, 2024	978-4-09-872241-9
2	February 26, 2024	978-4-09-872558-8
3	August 26, 2024	978-4-09-872694-3
4	March 26, 2025	978-4-09-873044-5
5	November 26, 2025	978-4-09-873268-5
6	August 26, 2026	978-4-09-873478-8

=== Other media ===
A voice comic adaptation was released on the Flower Comics YouTube channel on April 26, 2021. It featured the voices of Tatsuhisa Suzuki, Yurina Amami, Yūki Ono, Junpei Baba, Yuki Sakakihara, Miki Hase, and Aoi Goda.

A voice comic adaptation of the sequel manga, Bite Maker: AK, was released on the same channel on February 26, 2024. It featured the voices of Atsumi Tanezaki and Ryōhei Kimura.

== Reception ==
By February 2024, the series had over 5 million copies in circulation.

The series was ranked fourteenth in Honya Club's Nationwide Bookstore Employees' Recommended Comics of 2020.
