= Tahilalats =

Indonesian webcomic

- Author: Nurfadli Mursyid
- Current status/schedule: Updated four times a week
- Launch date: 30 August 2014

Tahilalats, also known as Mindblowon, is an Indonesian-language webcomic which is created, written and illustrated by Nurfadli Mursyid. First published through the Instagram account @tahilalats in 2014, the daily four-panel comic is one of the most-followed webcomics in Indonesia, being published primarily via Webtoon and social media platforms such as Instagram and Facebook. The webcomic follows the slice of life genre, generally with the addition of overexaggerated, absurd twists.

== History ==
In an interview with Antara News, Fadli stated that he had been creating picture stories since he was child, unaware of the existence of comics. During his civil engineering studies in a polytechnic in Makassar, Fadli became an illustrator for a local newspaper. Upon his graduation, he accepted a job offer from Jakarta-based social media company Dagelan. Fadli's parents did not support his career choice until he got a stable income from it. During this time, he began publishing four-panel comics through Instagram account @tahilalats. The Webtoon's name is a play on "Tahilalat, an Indonesian for nevus, which is prominent on Fadli's face. Its alternative name – Mind Blowon – is likewise a play on mind-blown and blo'on, an Indonesian slang for "dumb".

Although Fadli had begun publishing webcomics on his personal blog by 2013, it did not gain much attention. Contrary to the locally popular manga-styled webcomics of the time, Fadli opted for a simpler style to deliver surreal stories that mirrored some Western webcomics.

Due to the webcomic's rising popularity in social media, Fadli received and accepted an offer from Webtoon to become a contributor. Later in December 2015, he went to South Korea along with other popular Indonesian webcomic authors, attending the 2015 Webtoonist Day. A collection of Tahilalats strips was released in form of physical comic book in April 2017. Published by Loveable Publishers, the comic book was released as a limited print.

== Style ==
Tahilalats shows various daily lives of Indonesian teenagers and young adults, ranging from having meals to taking examinations and driving by adding an absurd plot twist for later panels. As Mursyid is self-taught, most of inspiration comes from his own daily life. The art-style of Tahilalats' is inspired by western webcomics, stating that it "works fairly well for a comic strip with surreal storylines. Simple, but people get the idea." Most strips of Tahilalats are one-shots, but a page would be related to another one published afterwards in several cases.

== Reception ==
Tahilalats has become one of the most popular webcomics in Indonesia, with nearly 3 million subscribers through Webtoon and 2.4 million Instagram followers, excluding its presence on other social media websites as of 2017. In May 2017, it was placed second between other Indonesian webcomics registered on Webtoon, where Indonesians form the largest user base of the service.
