= Ha Il-kwon =

South Korean manhwaga (born 1982)

- Born: January 10, 1982 (age 44) Seoul, South Korea
- Area: Webtoon artist
- Notable works: Annarasumanara, God of Bath, Duty after School

Ha Il-kwon (Korean: 하일권, born January 10, 1982) is a South Korean manhwaga. He graduated from Sejong University in South Korea and majored in Cartoon-Animation.

== Bibliography ==
Year	English title	Hangul
2006	Sambong Barber Shop	삼봉이발소
2007	Boss's Pure Love	보스의 순정
2008	3-Part Transformation, Kim Chang-Nam	3단합체김창남
2009	Be Still My Heart	두근두근두근거려
2010	Annarasumanara	안나라수마나라
2011	God of Bath	목욕의 신
2012	Duty After School	방과 후 전쟁활동
2013	Move! Here Warrior	출동! 히어로 전사
2015	GoGoGo	고고고
2016	Sperman	스퍼맨
2017–2018	Came Across	마주쳤다
2018–2019	Taste of Illness	병의 맛
2024–2025	The Video Game Store Under the Barbershop	이발소 밑 게임가게

== Adaptations ==
=== Screen ===
- The Sound of Magic (Annarasumanara) (안나라수마나라) (2022)
- Duty After School (방과 후 전쟁활동) (2023)
- Sperman (스퍼맨) (2025)

=== Stage ===
- Sambong Barber Shop (삼봉이발소) (2011)
- Annarasumanara (안나라수마나라) (2014)
