= Stomp, Kick, Love =

Japanese manga series

- First tankōbon volume cover

踏んだり、蹴ったり、愛したり (Fundari, Kettari, Aishitari)
- Genre: Drama; Romantic comedy
- Manga
- Written by: Sumi Ichiya
- Published by: ASCII Media Works
- English publisher: NA: Yen Press
- Imprint: Sylph Comics
- Magazine: Pixiv Sylph
- Original run: February 25, 2021 – present
- Volumes: 6

Stomp, Kick, Love (踏んだり、蹴ったり、愛したり, Fundari, Kettari, Aishitari) is a Japanese manga series written and illustrated by Sumi Ichiya. It began serialization on ASCII Media Works' Pixiv Comic-based Pixiv Sylph website in February 2021.

== Characters ==
Akira Iomori (五百森泰, Iomori Akira)
Voiced by: Yuma Uchida (voice comic)
Kaho Kusumi (久栖佳帆, Kusumi Kaho)
Voiced by: Yoko Hikasa (voice comic)

== Media ==
=== Manga ===
Written and illustrated by Sumi Ichiya, Stomp, Kick, Love began serialization on ASCII Media Works' Pixiv Comic-based Pixiv Sylph website on February 25, 2021. Its chapters have been compiled into six tankōbon volumes as of August 2025.

During their panel at Anime Expo 2024, Yen Press announced that they had licensed the series for English publication with the first volume releasing in December 2024.

No.	Original release date	Original ISBN	North American release date	North American ISBN
1	August 20, 2021	978-4-04-913886-3	December 10, 2024	978-1-9753-9970-2
2	March 22, 2022	978-4-04-914297-6	April 22, 2025	978-1-9753-9971-9
3	September 22, 2022	978-4-04-914589-2	September 23, 2025	978-1-9753-9972-6
4	July 22, 2023	978-4-04-915084-1	April 28, 2026	978-1-9753-9973-3
5	August 22, 2024	978-4-04-915868-7	December 15, 2026	979-8-8554-2353-2
6	August 22, 2025	978-4-04-916541-8	—	—

=== Other ===
A voice comic adaptation was uploaded to the Kadokawa Anime YouTube channel on December 2, 2022. It featured the voices of Yuma Uchida and Yoko Hikasa.

== Reception ==
The series was nominated twice for the eighth and the ninth Next Manga Awards in the web category in 2022 and 2023, and was ranked twentieth out of 41 nominees.
