= Blindsprings =

Fantasy webcomic

- Cover of the print collection

Publication information
- Publisher: Self-published online; print version published by Hiveworks
- Schedule: Last updated August 2019
- Format: Ongoing webcomic series
- Genre: Fantasy
- Publication date: October 2013

Creative team
- Created by: Kadi Fedoruk

Blindsprings is a fantasy webcomic by Kadi Fedoruk. Started in October 2013, it follows a magical Princess named Tamaura after she is forced to return from a spirit realm, finding that 300 years have passed.

== Premise ==
At the start of Blindsprings, Princess Tamaura of Aberwelle is believed to have been killed by revolutionaries along with the rest of her magical royal family, but is actually alive and living in a "Blindspring", an area hidden from humans where the spirits live. Tamaura made a deal with the spirits; in return for 300 years of service, they will protect her and her sister. There are no other humans with Tamaura until a boy named Harris appears and after meeting her, decides to "save" her from the Blindspring. He returns shortly later, though now an adult, and uses magic to keep the spirits at bay and force Tamaura out of the Blindspring. Tamaura finds that while time has passed slowly for her, almost 300 years have passed in Aberwelle, which is now an industrialised nation.

The story follows Tamaura as the main character, as well as her new friends Street and Ingrid, Harris, Ingrid's family, the militant Gravers, and a number of allied secret societies. The story features warring factions, morally grey villains, and a society with complicated prejudices. As described by one reviewer, "The comic explores conflicts where both parties can be wrong. Killing the royal family was wrong, but the monarchy probably wasn’t great; the spirits are needed for balance, but they are amoral and exact cruel contracts with the people."

== Reception ==
Kadi Fedoruk was nominated for a Joe Shuster Award for Webcomics Creator in 2014. Writing for io9, Lauren Davis called Blindsprings one of the best new webcomics of 2014.

== Publication ==
Blindsprings began to be published in October 2013. A book of the comic was published in 2017. A French edition was published by Hachette. The comic went on hiatus in August 2019 till April 2023. As of now the series is ongoing.
