= Isekai Samurai =

Japanese manga series

- First tankōbon volume cover

異世界サムライ
- Genre: Adventure; Chanbara; Isekai
- Manga
- Written by: Keigo Saitō
- Published by: Media Factory
- English publisher: NA: Yen Press
- Imprint: MF Comics
- Magazine: ComicWalker
- Original run: February 22, 2023 – present
- Volumes: 8
- icon

Isekai Samurai (Japanese: 異世界サムライ) is a Japanese manga series written and illustrated by Keigo Saitō. It began serialization on Kadokawa Corporation's ComicWalker website in February 2023.

== Plot ==
The manga follows Ginko, a female Samurai and a survivor of the Battle of Sekigahara. Having been taught an honorable death is the preferred fate of all Samurai, Ginko has tried and failed to find anyone to kill her but she is too skilled and powerful to be beaten. While praying to Buddha to help her find a worthy opponent that can finally kill her, Ginko finds herself transported to a magical medieval world where the humans and their allies are attacked by demons led by the mysterious Demon King. Excited to find a world with powerful enemies, she helps the humans fight against the demons and hoping to find an opponent who can give her an honorable death in battle.

== Publication ==
Written and illustrated by Keigo Saitō, Isekai Samurai began serialization on Kadokawa Corporation's ComicWalker website on February 22, 2023. The series' chapters have been collected by Media Factory in eight tankōbon volumes as of August 2026. The series is licensed in English by Yen Press.

No.	Original release date	Original ISBN	English release date	English ISBN
1	June 22, 2023	978-4-04-682464-6	June 24, 2025	979-8-8554-1657-2
2	October 20, 2023	978-4-04-682938-2	November 4, 2025	979-8-8554-1659-6
3	February 22, 2024	978-4-04-683284-9	May 26, 2026	979-8-8554-1661-9
4	August 22, 2024	978-4-04-683849-0	November 24, 2026	979-8-8554-2526-0
5	February 20, 2025	978-4-04-684397-5	—	—
6	September 22, 2025	978-4-04-685015-7	—	—
7	February 20, 2026	978-4-04-685531-2	—	—
8	August 21, 2026	978-4-04-660375-3	—	—

== Reception ==
The series was nominated for the ninth Next Manga Awards in the web category in 2023, and was ranked 17th. It was also nominated in the same category for the tenth edition in 2024 and was ranked 14th and won the Traditional Chinese version of the "Global Special Prize". The series was also ranked 17th in the 2024 edition of Takarajimasha's Kono Manga ga Sugoi! guidebook for the best manga for male readers. The series was also ranked eighth in the Nationwide Bookstore Employees' Recommended Comics list of 2024.
