= Damedol and the Only Fan in the World =

Japanese manga series

- First tankōbon volume cover

ダメドルと世界に1人だけのファン (Damedoru to Sekai ni Hitori Dake no Fan)
- Genre: Romantic comedy
- Manga
- Written by: Kirishimo
- Published by: Comic Smart (digital); Ichijinsha (print)
- English publisher: NA: Mangamo
- Magazine: Ganma!
- Original run: May 23, 2023 – present
- Volumes: 5

Damedol and the Only Fan in the World (Japanese: ダメドルと世界に1人だけのファン, Hepburn: Damedoru to Sekai ni Hitori Dake no Fan) is a Japanese manga series written and illustrated by Kirishimo. It was originally posted as a web manga on Twitter in December 2022, before beginning serialization on the Ganma! web service in May 2023. Ichijinsha has published five tankōbon volumes as of September 2026.

== Plot ==
The series follows Moegi Urushiba, a university student who is a member of the underground idol group Merry☆Universe. However, due to her clumsiness and poor singing and dancing skills she only has a single fan, Kimiya Okuda. Kimiya is also a university student who spends his time and money on oshikatsu supporting Urumin.

== Characters ==
Moegi Urushibara (漆原 萌, Urushibara Moegi)
Voiced by: Yumiri Hanamori (PV)
An underground idol in the group Merry☆Universe who goes by the name Urumin (うるみん). She is clumsy and not good at singing or dancing so she often makes mistakes during performances, leading to her having no fans other than Kimiya. She goes to the same university as Kimiya, although they have not met each other outside of idol activities. She is happy to have Kimiya as her fan.
Kimiya Okuda (奥田 君也, Okuda Kimiya)
Voiced by: Shoya Chiba (PV)
A university student at the same university as Moegi and one of Merry☆Universe's few fans. Due to the group's lack of popularity and Urumin's lack of talent, he is her only fan. He is very devoted to her and vows to support her with the strength of 8 billion people.
Ai Nobori (野堀 愛, Nobori Ai)
The leader of Merry☆Universe and oldest member of the group. She goes by the name Airu (あいる). She was previously a delinquent when she was in school.
Rei (レイ)
A member of Merry☆Universe, who has a masculine appearance. She is fond of reading boys' love works.
Suguru Mutsuki (睦月 優, Mutsuki Suguru)
A member of Merry☆Universe who goes by the name Mū-chan (むーちゃん). She has the appearance of a gyaru but despite her looks, she is actually the smartest member and a graduate student at university.
Popochi (ぽぽち)
At 19, she is the youngest member of Merry☆Universe.

== Publication ==
The series is written and illustrated by Kirishimo. It was originally posted on Twitter on December 11, 2022, where it gained popularity and received over 90,000 likes. Kirishimo was inspired to draw the manga by the idea of drawing a blushing girl and a straight-faced guy who makes her blush, as well as the idea of a guy liking a girl one-sidedly and the girl is embarrassed but secretly happy about his feelings. It later began serialization on Comic Smart's manga platform Ganma! on May 23, 2023. Ichijinsha published the first tankōbon volume on January 25, 2024. Five volumes have been released as of September 2026.

During their panel at Anime NYC 2025, Mangamo announced that they had licensed the series for English publication.

No.	Release date	ISBN
1	January 25, 2024	978-4-7580-2627-7
2	July 25, 2024	978-4-7580-2735-9
3	February 25, 2025	978-4-7580-2854-7
4	November 25, 2025	978-4-7580-2994-0
5	September 8, 2026	978-4-8251-0089-3

== Reception ==
The series was nominated for the 2024 and 2025 Next Manga Award in the Web Manga category.
