= Pictures for Sad Children =

Webcomic by Simone Veil (2007 - 2014)

- Author: Simone Veil
- Current status/schedule: Stopped
- Launch date: 2007
- End date: 2014
- Genre(s): Absurdist humor, black humor

Pictures for Sad Children is a 2007 webcomic, created by Simone Veil (at the time known as John Campbell). The webcomic, about a ghost named Paul, featured a spare and minimalist black-and-white artstyle and depressive, nihilistic themes. In 2012, Veil launched a highly successful Kickstarter campaign to publish a print collection of the webcomic. However, Veil was not able to ship all of the copies to backers, and emails from fans asking when their book would arrive eventually led Veil to burn some of the books. She later stated that only unsaleable copies had been burned and that all backers who had paid at least fifteen dollars were sent their copy. After Pictures for Sad Children was taken offline in 2014, a fan community rose up to share pages and other content from the webcomic.

== Overview ==
Paul trying to get his job back after dying and turning into a ghost.

Veil had posted comics online for some time before the 2007 launch of Pictures for Sad Children, including hourly comics and also longer stories, such as "Stevie Might Be a Bear Maybe" (published as a mini-comic by Loose Teeth Press). Veil entered the Daily Grind Iron Man Challenge webcomic competition in 2005.

Pictures for Sad Children is considered a simple webcomic, featuring only occasional plotlines and few recurring characters. CBS Chicago described Veil's black-and-white work as "rooted in nihilism, apathy, and frustration," though notes that these feelings are "prodded gently, and with love." The webcomic is centered around a ghost named Paul, who had nothing better to do with its afterlife than to simply return to doing its dayjob. ComicsAlliance stated that Pictures for Sad Children is "defined by its spare, minimalist drawing [and] a deep, pervading sense of ineluctable sadness that lingers long after you've finished the comic."

In 2010, Veil held an art exhibition, featuring depressing installations in the style of the webcomic.

== Kickstarter campaign ==
In 2012, Veil held a successful Kickstarter campaign which raised $51,615 USD to create a print version of Pictures for Sad Children, far exceeding the crowdfunding goal of $8,000 USD. However, in August, a few months after the campaign had concluded, the artist published a lengthy satirical post on the Kickstarter page in which she claimed that she had been pretending to be depressed in order to gain a profit. According to the post, her biggest regret was that she made it easier for what she described as "borderline people" to trick themselves into thinking that they are depressed as well. In the post, Veil also stated that she expected that the book would be finished and delivered before the end of 2012.

In February 2014, Veil published a new blog post in which she confirmed that she was able to ship around 75% of the Kickstarter rewards to her backers, but was unable to ship any more copies because she ran out of money. The post was accompanied with a video that shows Veil burning over a hundred copies of the book, with an attached threat to burn even more. According to DNAinfo.com, Veil spent $30,000 USD producing the 200-page hardcover book and even more to include a plastic-wrapped dead wasp in each copy, leaving little money for actual shipping. In 2021, Veil stated that the books that were burned were misprints or otherwise unsaleable copies, and indicated that all backers who had contributed at least fifteen dollars had received their copy.

In October 2015, Max Temkin contacted some initial Kickstarter backers who never received their copy via email, and offered them "one of the remaining copies", distributing an unknown number of remaining copies of the book. It isn't clear how he came to be involved.

== Closure ==
The webcomic was taken offline in 2014 and is no longer available. As Pictures for Sad Children was taken offline, Kickstarter backer Jacob Weiss suggested that he would send his copy of the book to anyone who was not able to read it, as he had already finished reading it himself. Within a week, there were over 100 people asking for the book, and Weiss decided to send it to one of them along with $15 so that they could send it to someone else. Along with this process of sending the book to different interested parties came offers from other people who were also interested in sending books around or uploading PDF versions. Some users shared screenshots of Veil's blog, audio interviews Veil had done, and so on. Meanwhile, Veil had expressed a desire for a diminished internet presence and did not want her work to be publicly hosted or reposted, turning Weiss' "Book Club" into a more private gathering. Weiss wanted to issue a takedown of the Google Drive with all the Pictures for Sad Children content in late 2014, but felt unable to do so at the time. As of July 16, 2015, "the Sad Children Book Club has ended, and the files are no longer accessible to anyone."

== Legacy ==
Pictures for Sad Children was a finalist in the 2008 Web Cartoonists' Choice Awards in the "Outstanding Newcomer" category, losing to Meredith Gran's Octopus Pie.

Starting January 1, 2006, Simone Veil began drawing hourly autobiographical comics. Veil then recruited several other cartoonists to spend February 1 doing the same. The resulting "Hourly Comics Day" grew in popularity, inspiring webcomic artists such as Kate Beaton and John Allison to create 24-hour comics of their own. Though it is no longer organized by Veil, Hourly Comics Day continues to be observed in the comics community and beyond in February each year. In 2026, after the Cartoonist Cooperative (now known as Cartoonists United) took over hosting of the original domain, the date was moved from February 1st to the 8th in solidarity with Black History Month.

In 2013, Veil published DMT, a color comic in PDF format about the psychoactive drug dimethyltryptamine. One year later, fans noticed a website that purported to be the official site of the 2014 film Birdman, but contained an assortment of stories and comics by Simone Veil about the film's star Michael Keaton.
