= Death-Day =

Web comic

- Cover of volume 1

Publication information
- Publisher: La Luz Comics
- Format: Webcomic; Graphic novel
- Genre: Biopunk, Military science fiction
- Publication date: 2009-10-31
- No. of issues: 5

Creative team
- Written by: Sam Hiti
- Artist: Sam Hiti
- Editor: Joseph Midthun

Death-Day is a webcomic and series of graphic novels created by Minnesota cartoonist Sam Hiti and edited by Joseph Midthun. The comic follows a group of soldiers fighting grotesque monsters on an alien planet and has a pronounced war-theme. Death-Day was published online in episodic form since 2009, and the first of four graphic novels was published in September 2010. The comic was well-received because of its detailed art.

== Synopsis ==
Lauren Davis, writing for ComicsAlliance, summed Death-Day up as "military science fiction filled with unnerving biomechanical creations. Death-Day is about a group of soldiers stranded on an exotic planet, where they have to defend themselves against grotesque monsters while attempting to find a way back to Earth. Max Sparber of MinnPost pointed out that the comic has a near-total lack of exposition, as most context of the story is left untold. It is unclear why a war is taking place between humanity and the enormous six-limbed monsters or on what world the characters are stationed. All that is clear is the mission of the military team: to destroy some sort of black orb behind enemy lines.

== Development ==
"Sam was floundering. It was all inked but he couldn’t finish it. He couldn’t end the story. So I offered to help."

— Joseph Midthun

Established comics creator Sam Hiti got the inspiration to create Death-Day after the September 11 attacks and the wars that followed shortly after the collapse of the World Trade Center. As a child, Hiti did not know what the letter D in "D-Day" stood for, and concluded that it must stand for "death" due to all the deceased people that are shown on television on the anniversary of the Normandy landings. Later in life, Hiti decided that if he were ever to write a story about war, "Death-Day" would make a great title.

Hiti created Death-Day in collaboration with Joseph "Joe" Midthun, who took on the role of editor. Midthun lived in the same apartment building as Hiti and studied film in college, which got the two talking about comics. As Hiti "respected what he had to say," he showed Midthun an early draft of Death-Day, after which he slowly became part of the creation process. The development of Death-Day took multiple years: though Midthun considered the art to be of high quality, the two had difficulty figuring out an ending for the comic. Hiti and Midthun went through a process of moving art around and changing the format of the story, but to no avail. After a few years, this version of the story was scrapped and the two started from scratch. Hiti has said that he has "4-foot[sic] high stack of pages" that will probably never be released.

According to Hiti, communication between him and Midthun was poor during the development process, but Hiti "respected [Midthun's] intelligence enough" to try and work through it. Hiti stated that Midthun "challenged [him] technically, creatively, and internally." Midthun similarly stated that the collaboration it was difficult at first, and that though his background in film gave him experience in working with other people, creating an independent comic was very different.

=== Content ===
Death-Day was initially created in a more "spiritual setting" and Hiti has stated that the comic turned out "more science fiction" than he had originally planned. Hiti wanted the comic to be set in a world which the reader can relate to, and felt adding science fiction elements helped in this regard. He said that the purpose of both science and spirituality is to answer deep philosophical questions, and Midthun added that Death-Day is "just fiction ... a reflection of reality." Midthun said that, through Death-Day, the two are trying to make a statement both about comics and about life itself.

Hiti let himself be influenced by things he visually ingested as a child, such as cartoons and old war and science fiction films. Furthermore, Hiti was inspired by a quote from C.S. Lewis he heard at a conference in 2005, which made him focus more on writing a "good story" rather than writing what he believed in:

We do not need more people writing Christian books; what we need is more Christians writing good books.

— C.S. Lewis

== Release ==
Midthun and Hiti released the first Death-Day graphic novel in September 2010.

Hiti and Midthun first released Death-Day in the form of a webcomic on his own website, before publishing the series in the form of graphic novels. Death-Day consists of twenty "episodes", each approximately 30 pages in length. The first episode was released on Hiti's personal website on October 31, 2009, which got 8,000 unique views in ten days. The second episode was released one month after the first. Each five episodes would eventually be compiled into one graphic novel, resulting in four books. The first graphic novel was published by La Luz Comics in September 2010.

In May 2015, Sam Hiti announced that he would retire his comics career entirely, possibly because of a series of unfortunate setbacks or due to ill health. Hiti has not responded to any inquiries regarding the future of his comics.

== Reception ==
The first graphic novel of Death-Day was positively received after its release. Sparber of MinnPost liked the vagueness of the comic, stating that the unexplained nature of the war works well with the highly detailed science fiction setting. Sparber also stated that the artwork is the finest aspect of the comic, praising the crowded frames filled with details and extensive shading, and declaring that some panels "must have taken hours to complete." Sparber also noticed a "deliberate sloppiness" to Hiti's style, as all lines seem to sway and shading is not perfectly executed, resulting in a "sense of frenzy." Cecilia Johnson of the Star Tribune also praised Hiti's "bold, expressive" artwork for its high level of detail.

Writing for Comic Book Resources, Michael May applauded Death-Day's slowly paced story and densely packed artwork, saying that he "couldn’t help feeling satisfied" despite the fact that the story was still incomplete. May praised the comic highly because, according to him, "the world is so whole, the concept is so thorough [and] the characters are so well-rounded."
