= Henchgirl =

Comic by Kristen Gudsnuk

- Cover of the trade paperback, second edition
- Genre: Superhero, coming-of-age

Creative team
- Created by: Kristen Gudsnuk

Henchgirl is a comic by Kristen Gudsnuk about a henchperson working for a supervillain. Originally a webcomic, it was published in issues then as a trade paperback. In 2020, a television adaptation was announced to be in development.

== Premise ==
Mary Posa is the title character of Henchgirl, which takes place in the fictional Crepe City, a city overrun with crime due to its many supervillains. While she has some superpowers and mostly likes her life as a henchperson in the Butterfly Gang, she is too nice for a life of crime and starts wondering if being a henchperson is right for her when her crew starts planning to defraud an orphanage.

According to reviewer Lauren Davis, Henchgirl has "Much of the story is driven by Mary's overwhelming desire to be nice, even as she's out committing crimes. She's romanticized her supervillain life, but that's getting harder as her gang is looking to expand its criminal activities. On top of that, she has a rivalry with a fellow henchlady. And there's the small detail that most of the people in Mary's life aren't villains — in fact, some of them are heroes." A writer for CBR said that "while it takes place in a superhero milieu, the superhero/supervillain dynamic is merely the catalyst for a book about a young woman trying to find her place in the world, dealing with roommates who wish she'd grow up, and a possible love interest who has his own secrets."

== Publication history ==
Gudsnuk started work on Henchgirl in May 2013 and began publishing it online in June 2013. After starting to attend conventions and self-publishing some physical copies, she met an employee of Scout Comics at New York City Comic Con in 2014, and Scout Comics subsequently picked up Henchgirl and printed it as issues. A trade paperback collecting the whole story was printed by Dark Horse Comics in 2017; a second edition was published in 2020 with an additional story.

The original site of the webcomic is no longer online. Gudsnuk announced at the end of 2016 that she would be shutting down the site now that the comic had been physically printed, to avoid the costs of hosting the comic.

== Reception ==
Writing for Paste Magazine, writer Caitlin Roberg said, "Henchgirl nails all the best parts of “becoming an adult” bildungsromans, with a dynamic and diverse cast sorting through 20-something ambiguity. By layering real drama under the high pressure and comedy of a superhero story, Gudsnuk crafts vivid characters and draws readers deeper into her world... Henchgirl is full of visual gags and humor to temper the violence that Mary and her friends face as their story unfolds. Gudsnuk's skill with characterization and nuanced, unexpected storytelling are complemented by her bright and poppy art style."

Writing for The Guardian, Graeme Virtue said, 'Henchgirl might sound a little goofy but Gudsnuk sneaks in some emotional gut-punches along the way. In the current fifth issue, Mary has to deal with the aftermath of a painful break-up – sadly an occupational hazard when your pal’s superpower is turning into a mannequin."

== Proposed television adaptation ==
In November 2020, Scout Comics announced that Henchgirl was being developed as a live-action television series for Freeform, a basic cable channel owned by a subsidiary of the Walt Disney Company. The announcement did not include a release date or casting information.
