= Chō yo Hana yo =

Japanese manga series

- First wideban volume cover

腸よ鼻よ
- Genre: Autobiography; Comedy
- Manga
- Written by: Zenyu Shimabukuro
- Published by: Comic Smart (digital); Kadokawa Shoten (print)
- Magazine: Ganma!
- Original run: June 30, 2017 – April 14, 2023
- Volumes: 10

Chō yo Hana yo (腸よ鼻よ; "O Gut, O Nose!") is a Japanese manga series written and illustrated by Zenyu Shimabukuro. It was serialized on Comic Smart's Ganma! manga website from June 2017 to April 2023, with its volume releases handled by Kadokawa Shoten.

== Synopsis ==
The series is an autobiographical comedy based on the author's experiences trying to serialize her manga while battling ulcerative colitis.

== Publication ==
Written and illustrated by Zenyu Shimabukuro, Chō yo Hana yo was serialized on Comic Smart's Ganma! website from June 30, 2017, to April 14, 2023. The series' chapters were collected by Kadokawa Shoten into ten wideban volumes released from September 13, 2019, to September 22, 2023.

No.	Release date	ISBN
1	September 13, 2019	978-4-04-735777-8
2	November 29, 2019	978-4-04-735851-5
3	June 30, 2020	978-4-04-736172-0
4	March 4, 2021	978-4-04-736511-7
5	September 9, 2021	978-4-04-736779-1
6	March 10, 2022	978-4-04-736956-6
7	September 15, 2022	978-4-04-737195-8
8	March 16, 2023	978-4-04-737427-0
9	August 18, 2023	978-4-04-737619-9
10	September 22, 2023	978-4-04-737620-5

== Reception ==
In 2019, the series was ranked third in the 5th Next Manga Awards in the web category.
