= Love Revolution (manhwa) =

2013–2023 South Korean manhwa

연애혁명 Yeonae hyeongmyeong
- Genre: Romantic comedy
- Author: 232
- Webtoon service: Naver Webtoon (Korean)
- Original run: September 4, 2013 – April 26, 2023
- Video game

Love Revolution: Find It!
- Publisher: Lunosoft Inc.
- Genre: Puzzle
- Engine: Smartphone
- Platform: Android iOS
- Released: March 25, 2021

Love Revolution (Korean: 연애혁명) is a South Korean manhwa released as a webtoon written and illustrated by 232. It was serialized via Naver Corporation's webtoon platform, Naver Webtoon, from September 2013 to April 2023, with the individual chapters collected. A live-action adaptation series was released on September 1 to December 27, 2020, on KakaoTV and Naver SERIES.

== Media ==
=== Manhwa ===
232 launched Love Revolution in Naver's webtoon platform Naver Webtoon on September 4, 2013. Love Revolution has collected 4 billion views worldwide.

=== Game ===
A mobile puzzle game titled Love Revolution: Find It! (연애혁명-숨은그림찾기 with NAVER WEBTOON) developed by Lunosoft Inc., was released on March 25, 2021.

=== Live-action series ===
A South Korean live action series based on this manhwa was released from September 1 - December 27, 2020 on KakaoTV.

=== Other media ===
The series was featured on the South Korean reality music show Webtoon Singer, premiered on the streaming service TVING on February 17, 2023, which featured K-pop artists' performances combining webtoons with extended reality technology.
