= Wind Breaker (manhwa) =

South Korean webtoon

^윈드브레이커
- Genre: Sports (fixie)
- Author: Yongseok Jo
- Webtoon service: Naver Webtoon (Korean); Line Webtoon (English)
- Original run: December 8, 2013 – July 11, 2025
- Volumes: 26

Wind Breaker (Korean: 윈드브레이커) is a South Korean manhwa released as a webtoon written and illustrated by Yongseok Jo. It was serialized via Naver Corporation's webtoon platform, Naver Webtoon, from December 2013 to July 2025, with the individual chapters collected and published into 26 volumes. The manhwa has been published in English by Line Webtoon. The series was cancelled after it was discovered the series author was plagiarizing other works via tracing.

== Plot ==
Jo "Jay" Ja-hyeon (조자현) wants to ride bikes because he looks up to his uncle Jo Mahyeon (조 마현) who was a professional cyclist. Jay received a bike from his uncle and has been obsessed with cycling ever since. Later Jay finds out about an event called League of Streets, where cyclists form teams to compete against each other. This event is when Jay starts to make a name for himself.

== Characters ==
Jo "Jay" Ja-hyeon (조자현; Jo Jahyeon)
Main character of the manhwa, often called Super Rookie by his fans. He is one of the members of the Hummingbird Crew, one of the crews that participated in the League of Streets Korean Branch. Nephew of Jo Ma-hyeon, a Korean professional cyclist.
Shelly Scott
An experienced cyclist from England as her father, Mark Scott, is a legendary cyclist. She is one of the members of the Hummingbird Crew. Has a crush on Jay. Later she starts dating Jay.
Hong "Vinny" Yubin (홍유빈; Hong Yubin)
Known as 'Mad Dog' because of his brutality. He is a member of Sabbath Crew before leaving the Zephyros Crew first, the Hummingbird Crew second, and the Ghost Crew third.
Kang "Dom" Hannam (강한남; Gang Hannam)
Son of the notorious Korean mafia. He is one of the members of the Hummingbird Crew and acts as a sprinter.
Yoon "Minu" Min-woo (윤민우; Yun Minu)
Lee "June" Jun-soo (이준수; I Junsu)
Kim "Mia" Mi-yeong (김미영; Gim Miyeong)
Yoon "Yuna" Yun-ha (윤유나; Yun Yuna)
Owen Knight
Yoo Wooin (유우인; Yu Uin)
Hajun "Joker" (하준; Hajun)
Kwon "Grim Reaper" Hyuk (권혁; Gwon Hyeok)
Kim "Monster" Deokbong (김덕봉; Gim Deokbong)
Leader of Monster Crew, one of the participating crews in League of Streets Korean Branch, and a former quarterback in some high schools in the United States. He returns to Korea and regains his confident after doing cycling.
Jang Juhwan (장주환; Jang Juhwan)
Leader of Trident Crew, one of the participating crews in League of Streets Korean Branch. Had a rivalry with Monster because he thought the girl that he had a crush on had a crush on Monster.
Noah Austin
Harry Shepherd
Kaneshiro Takeda (武田金城, Takeda Kaneshiro)
Ryohei Hachijō (八条良平, Hachijou Ryohei)
Kenji Ikusaba (イクサバケンジ, Ikusaba Kenji)
Hyōma Nagase (永瀬兵間, Nagase Hyouma)

== Media ==
=== Manhwa ===
Yongseok Jo launched Wind Breaker in Naver's webtoon platform Naver Webtoon on December 8, 2013. Its serialization was suspended by Naver Webtoon on July 11, 2025, following allegations of tracing illustrations from other works. On July 19, 2025, Naver announced it would offer refunds to anyone who paid for the webtoon.

==== Volumes ====
No.	Korean release date	Korean ISBN
1	May 30, 2016	979-1-18-519334-2
2	June 27, 2016	979-1-18-519336-6
3	January 3, 2017	979-1-18-519346-5
4	October 20, 2017	979-1-18-519375-5
5	December 27, 2017	979-1-18-519390-8
6	October 12, 2018	979-1-16-279029-8
7	October 12, 2018	979-1-16-279030-4
8	November 23, 2018	979-1-16-279032-8
9	February 1, 2019	979-1-16-279039-7
10	February 1, 2019	979-1-16-279040-3
11	February 1, 2019	979-1-16-279041-0
12	June 14, 2019	979-1-16-279049-6
13	September 24, 2019	979-1-16-279057-1
14	February 12, 2020	979-1-16-279063-2
15	October 14, 2020	979-1-16-279069-4
16	October 14, 2020	979-1-16-279070-0
17	July 21, 2021	979-1-19-015321-8
18	September 29, 2021	979-1-16-779015-6
19	January 26, 2022	979-1-16-779061-3
20	April 26, 2022	979-1-16-779084-2
21	February 14, 2023	979-1-16-779206-8
22	February 27, 2023	979-1-16-779209-9
23	June 28, 2023	979-1-16-779257-0
24	August 10, 2023	979-1-16-779283-9
25	December 21, 2023	979-1-16-779360-7
26	January 29, 2024	979-1-16-779375-1

=== Other media ===
The series was featured on the South Korean reality music show Webtoon Singer, premiered on the streaming service TVING on February 17, 2023, which featured K-pop artists' performances combining webtoons with extended reality technology.
