= Romance 101 =

2018–2021 South Korean webtoon

바른연애 길잡이 RR: Bareun yeonae giljabi MR: Parŭn yŏnae kiljabi
- Genre: Romance
- Author: Namsoo
- Webtoon service: Naver Webtoon (Korean); Line Webtoon (English)
- Original run: March 13, 2018 – July 27, 2021
- Volumes: 12

Romance 101 (Korean: 바른연애 길잡이) is a South Korean manhwa released as a webtoon written and illustrated by Namsoo. It was serialized via Naver Corporation's webtoon platform, Naver Webtoon, from March 2018 to July 2021, with the individual chapters collected and published into 12 volumes. The manhwa has been published in English by Line Webtoon. A Japanese live-action adaptation series premiered on January 1, 2023, on TV Asahi.

== Media ==
=== Manhwa ===
Namsoo launched Romance 101 in Naver's webtoon platform Naver Webtoon on March 13, 2018.

==== Volume list ====
No.	Korean release date	Korean ISBN
1	May 27, 2019	979-1-19-649427-8
2	May 27, 2019	979-1-19-649428-5
3	May 27, 2019	979-1-19-649429-2
4	January 15, 2020	979-1-19-015319-5
5	January 15, 2020	979-1-19-015320-1
6	May 21, 2020	979-1-19-015327-0
7	January 28, 2021	979-1-19-015363-8
8	January 28, 2021	979-1-19-015364-5
9	April 7, 2021	979-1-19-015368-3
10	August 31, 2021	979-1-16-779008-8
11	August 31, 2021	979-1-16-779009-5
12	October 6, 2021	979-1-16-779011-8

=== Other media ===
The series was featured on the South Korean reality music show Webtoon Singer, premiered on the streaming service TVING on February 17, 2023, which featured K-pop artists' performances combining webtoons with extended reality technology.
