= Lee Jong-beom (artist) =

South Korean webtoon artist

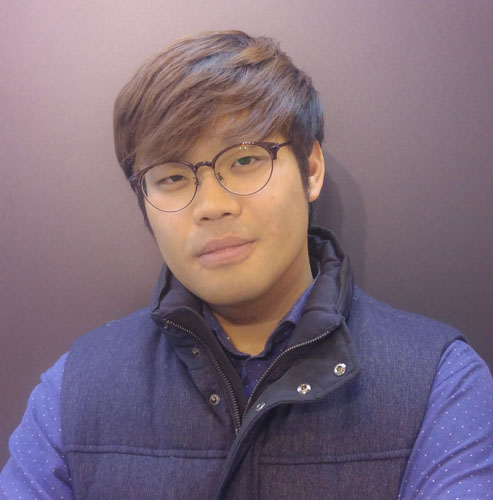
- Born: March 2, 1982 (age 44) South Korea
- Area: Webtoon artist

Korean name
- Hangul: 이종범
- RR: I Jongbeom
- MR: I Chongbŏm

Lee Jong-beom (Korean: 이종범; born March 2, 1982) is a South Korean webtoon artist. He is best known for writing the webtoon Dr. Frost. He has also appeared in The Genius: Black Garnet in 2014.
