= Nano List =

South Korean webtoon

^나노_리스트
- Author: Min Song-ah
- Webtoon service: Naver Webtoon (Korean); Line Webtoon (English)
- Original run: January 23, 2016 – December 22, 2018
Nano List
- Country of origin: South Korea
Production
- Production companies: Studio Gale; Studio N
Original release
- Network: TVING

Nano List (Korean: 나노리스트) is a South Korean manhwa released as a webtoon written and illustrated by Min Song-ah. It was serialized via Naver Corporation's webtoon platform Naver Webtoon from January 2016 to December 2018, with the individual chapters collected. The manhwa has been published in English by Line Webtoon. An aeni series adaptation by Studio Gale and Studio N has been announced and will be released on the OTT streaming platform TVING.

== See also ==
- The Girl Downstairs, another manhwa series by the same author
