= Subnormality =

Webcomic by Winston Rowntree

- Author(s): Winston Rowntree
- Website: viruscomix.com
- Current status/schedule: Updating infrequently
- Launch date: 2007
- Genre(s): Humor, Politics, Satire, Absurd

Subnormality is a satirical and often absurdist webcomic by a cartoonist who uses the pseudonym Winston Rowntree. Rowntree is a former resident of Regina, Saskatchewan who now lives in Toronto, Ontario. The strip appears at Rowntree's own website and occasionally at Cracked, where Rowntree also publishes the related webcomic Abnormality and created the animated web series peopleWatching.

== Style and development ==
Subnormality makes heavy use of written language; it is frequently verbose, often featuring large portions of text in the form of lengthy monologues and dialogues, narrative boxes, or thought balloons. Occasionally, as in the strip "The Line", it will heavily integrate text within the image and/or consist almost entirely of text. This heavy use of text is acknowledged by the comic's slogan, "Comix with too many words since 2007". When asked in an interview about his use of words, Rowntree said: "In terms of the amount of text in a given comic, I make absolutely no efforts whatsoever to limit that. If what I want to say is 2000 words then that’s how much text is gonna be in there. I would write a book, but I am not a skilled writer or thinker."

In tone and content, strips are occasionally just absurd or parody, and are often comedic; however, some, such as "The Line", are not humorous in tone and even many of the comedic strips often make comments on human nature (often misanthropic or deconstructive in nature) or current politics (often left-leaning).

In an interview with Observer, Rowntree stated that he hopes to keep Subnormality alive for as long as possible.

== Characters ==
The names of the characters are generally left unspecified, and there are a large number of them, varying unpredictably. These are some of the recurring characters:

- The Sphynx. She is an immortal monster based upon the mythical creature; she eats people (at most one or two each day) to live. She does not ask or respond to riddles, and mocks anyone who believes in this stereotype about her. Many people seem to be aware that she eats people, but they respond only by running away or appeasing her. On one occasion, she was stopped by a policeman, not because she was eating people, but because she was walking down the middle of the street and blocking traffic, causing her to have an altercation with him about the car culture and ultimately eat him. However, when not eating people, she is generally nice to them, abiding by most of the other laws and conventions of society (although most doors are too small for her, so she often has to enter buildings by tearing down parts of the walls). Her extreme age frequently causes trouble with her inability to adjust to changes in society, such as one incident when she asked the fire department, the water department, a car repair place with a sign up about radiators, and an aquarium manager how to get heat in her house. She was ultimately unable to do this, and tried to use a fireplace, only to burn down her house.
- An intelligent and thoughtful, but extremely insecure and uncertain, young woman (AKA Pink-Haired Girl). She is often menaced by personifications of her problems, such as a green blob monster representing her lack of money. She can change the color of her hair between brown and pink at will, making it brown when trying to get and keep a job and pink otherwise. Over the course of the series, she obtains her bachelor's degree (presumably in something with few practical applications), attempts to find a job, works as a waitress to obtain money for grad school for a while, quits, and then tries to become a flight attendant. She befriends the Sphynx after the Sphynx saves her from being run over by a bus.
- Ethel, a gothic horror fiction author who lives in the same town as the Sphinx and Pink-Haired Girl. Struggles with many personal issues, such as depression and self-doubt. Became friends with Pink-Haired girl when they applied for a job at the same airport on the same day, and they have interacted on several more strips since. Rowntree has often stated that his characters reflect pieces of his own personality, and Ethel reflects that.
- Marie & Annelise. Not actually named in-comic, but names seen on earlier work featuring the characters. Two friends who are often seen together and discuss various topics in the comic. It is implied they will in the future become romantically involved.
- The succubus. She is a green-skinned demon with horns, who comes up to Earth because she doesn't like dating male demons and prefers humans. However, there is no evidence that she kills, damns, or steals the souls of the men she finds here. She is also seen at work, introducing people to new tortures and getting them oriented in Hell. She is not evil necessarily, as she obviously has a negative opinion of the occupants of Hell because of what they did in life.
- Two neo-Nazis. These frequently attempt to use a time machine to alter history so the Third Reich won World War II, but something always goes wrong. For example, they attempted to kill Theodore Roosevelt, who nearly destroyed their time machine, instead of Franklin Roosevelt.

== Reception ==
In 2013, Subnormality was nominated for a Slate Magazine "Cartoonist Studio Prize" in the webcomics category, and won the same category in 2015 for a page titled "Watching". Tris McCall of Inside Jersey listed Subnormality among the "best webcomics" of 2013, praising its large scale despite its imperfect visual quality.
