= Tomorrow (manhwa) =

2017–2023 South Korean webtoon

내일 Naeil
- Genre: Drama
- Author: Llama
- Webtoon service: Naver Webtoon (Korean); Line Webtoon (English)
- Original run: May 20, 2017 – April 29, 2023
- Volumes: 18

Tomorrow (Korean: 내일) is a South Korean manhwa released as a webtoon written and illustrated by Llama. It was serialized via Naver Corporation's webtoon platform, Naver Webtoon from May 2017 to April 2023, with the individual chapters collected and published into 18 volumes. The manhwa has been published in English by Line Webtoon. A live-action adaptation premiered on April 1, 2022, on MBC TV.

== Media ==
=== Manhwa ===
Llama launched Tomorrow in Naver's webtoon platform Naver Webtoon on May 20, 2017.

==== Volume list ====
No.	Korean release date	Korean ISBN
1	June 6, 2019	978-8-92-556626-9
2	June 6, 2019	978-8-92-556627-6
3	September 25, 2019	978-8-92-556628-3
4	September 25, 2019	978-8-92-556629-0
5	January 21, 2020	978-8-92-556630-6
6	January 21, 2020	978-8-92-556631-3
7	August 20, 2020	978-8-92-554654-4
8	August 20, 2020	978-8-92-554701-5
9	May 31, 2021	978-8-92-554760-2
10	May 31, 2021	978-8-92-559296-1
11	December 27, 2021	978-8-92-554880-7
12	December 27, 2021	978-8-92-555344-3
13	March 25, 2022	978-8-92-557864-4
14	March 25, 2022	978-8-92-557863-7
15	January 18, 2023	978-8-92-557862-0
16	January 18, 2023	978-8-92-557861-3
17	July 5, 2023	978-8-92-557860-6
18	July 5, 2023	978-8-92-557859-0

=== Other media ===
The series was featured on the South Korean reality music show Webtoon Singer, premiered on the streaming service TVING on February 17, 2023, which featured K-pop artists' performances combining webtoons with extended reality technology.
