= Dr. Frost =

2011–2021 South Korean manhwa series

- Volume 1 cover, featuring the titular character

닥터 프로스트 RR: Dakteo Peuroseuteu MR: Takt'ŏ P'ŭrosŭt'ŭ
- Author: Lee Jong-beom
- Publisher: (South Korea) Anibooks
- English publisher: Webtoon
- Magazine: Naver Webtoon; Webtoon (official English translation)
- Original run: February 2, 2011 – October 1, 2021
- Collected volumes: 18

Dr. Frost (TV series)

Dr. Frost (Korean: 닥터 프로스트) is a South Korean manhwa written and illustrated by Lee Jong-beom. This webtoon was released on internet portal Webtoon from February 2, 2011, October 1, 2021, with the first imprint volume being published on May 18, 2012. It was adapted into a Korean drama of the same name in 2014.

== Volumes ==
No.	Korean release date	Korean ISBN
1	May 18, 2012	978-89-59194-51-3
2	November 9, 2012	978-89-59194-96-4
3	February 8, 2013	978-89-59195-16-9
4	August 30, 2013	978-89-59195-72-5
5	October 31, 2014	978-89-59196-97-5
6	January 16, 2015	978-89-59197-04-0
7	December 12, 2021	978-89-54683-54-8
8	December 24, 2015	978-89-59197-68-2
9	November 12, 2021	978-89-54683-55-5
10	December 24, 2015	978-89-59197-70-5
11	December 24, 2015	978-89-59197-71-2
12	October 14, 2019	979-11-64330-59-1
13	October 14, 2019	979-11-64330-60-7
14	October 14, 2019	979-11-64330-61-4
15	October 14, 2019	979-11-64330-62-1
16	March 6, 2023	978-89-54691-69-7
17	May 28, 2024	978-89-54698-27-6
18	November 15, 2024	979-11-41602-18-5

== Related media ==
The series was featured on the South Korean reality music show Webtoon Singer, premiered on the streaming service TVING on February 17, 2023, which featured K-pop artists' performances combining webtoons with extended reality technology.
