= Brown Paperbag =

Webcomic

- Author: Sailesh Gopalan
- Current status/schedule: Ongoing
- Launch date: 2016-06-25
- Publisher: WEBTOON
- Genre: Slice of life

Brown Paperbag is a slice of life webcomic by Mumbaikar cartoonist Sailesh Gopalan that began in June 2016.

== Overview ==
Brown Paperbag Comics consists of gag-a-day pages that draw from mundane situations within a stereotypical Indian family. The webcomic often focuses on two angsty teenagers, Kabir and Ananya, who frequently have to deal with their overprotective and intrusive parents. Many pages of Brown Paperbag are modeled after the hypocrisies perpetuated by Indian society, but the webcomic does not feature any particularly political themes.

== Development ==
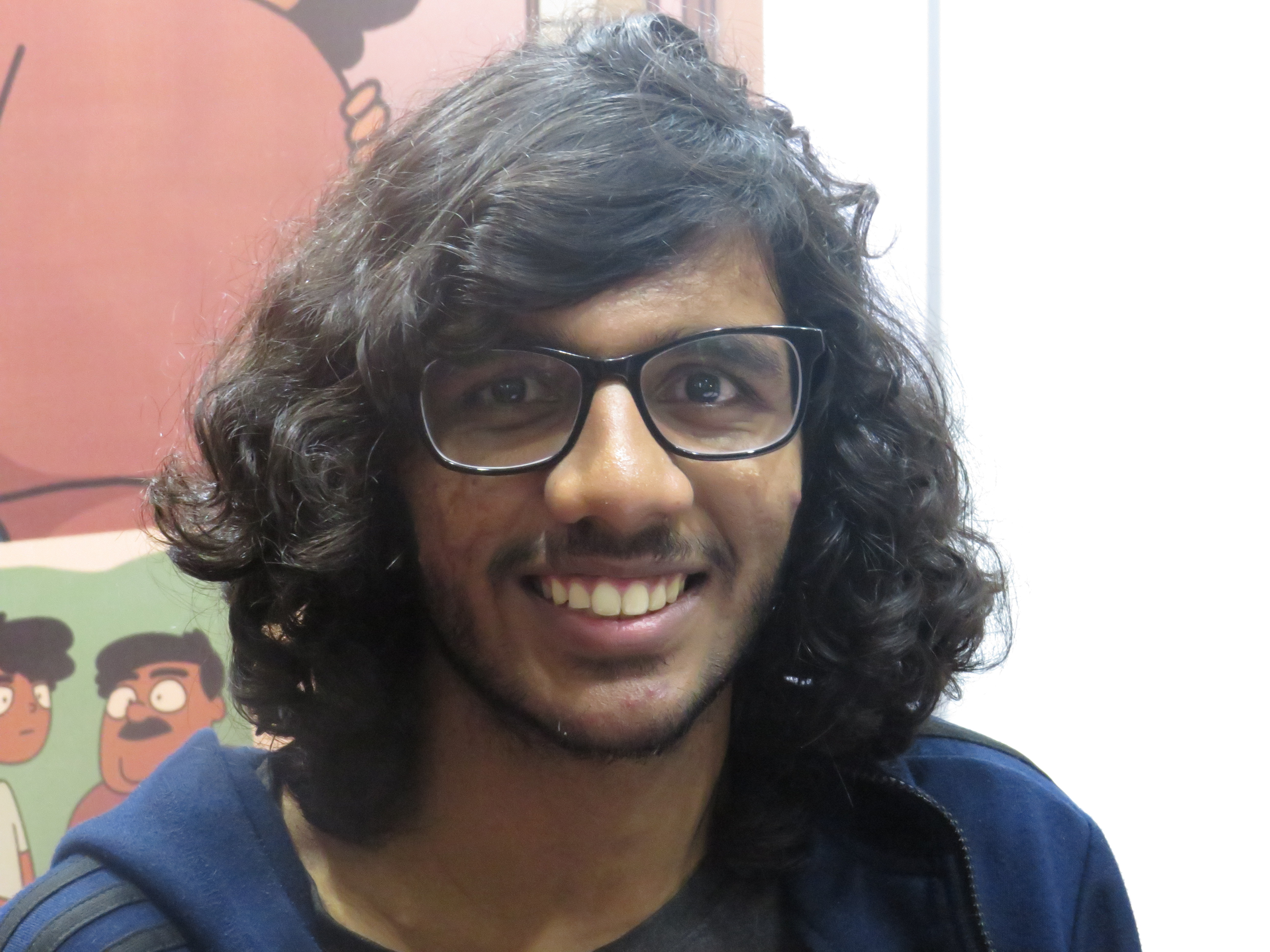
Sailesh Gopalan is the creator of the comics.

Sailesh Gopalan began Brown Paperbag on June 25, 2016. 20 years old at the time, Gopalan was studying animation at the Srishti Institute of Art, Design & Technology in Bangalore. Gopalan has stated that he decided to start a webcomic on a whim, as he had noticed a lack of Indian daily life satire comics that were devoid of politics. Gopalan made the first page of Brown Paperbag within an hour of conceptualizing Brown Paperbag as a whole. He initially released the page both on Facebook and WEBTOON, under the pen name Saigo.

The name of the webcomic is based on the skincolor of Indian people, as well as the "unvarnished realities of everyday life." In an interview with Scroll.in, Gopalan stated that "I was trying to portray society as it really is, without the mask that people put on. When you look at old cartoons, you see brown paper bags with two eyeholes punched in them that people put on their heads to hide." However, Gopalan insists that the webcomic is not intended to be particularly political, as he stated that "there are enough political comics in India." Brown Paperbag explores the behavior of people in Indian culture, rather than focusing on the people in power. Gopalan has said that his characters are stereotypes, but not based on any particular group of people. As such, Brown Paperbag typically exaggerates the conventional social roles assigned to parents, teenagers, and siblings.

Brown Paperbag was inspired by Shenanigansen's Bluechair and Sarah Andersen's Sarah's Scribbles. The webcomic's approach to storytelling and comedy was also influenced by that of manga artist Eiichiro Oda. Gopalan has stated that he intended to implement 2D animation to Brown Paperbag at some point, and produced a short celebratory animation when he reached 100,000 followers on Facebook in 2017. Though Gopalan gets many suggestions from fans, he primarily tries to take scenarios from his own life and work on his own ideas.

== Impact ==
Gopalan's webcomic went viral within a month after its launch, getting over 50,000 likes in its first five days and getting over 70,000 followers in only three weeks. Gopalan had acquired over 174,000 followers on Facebook and over 185,000 followers on Instagram by October 2018.
