= Alex Norris (cartoonist) =

British comic artist

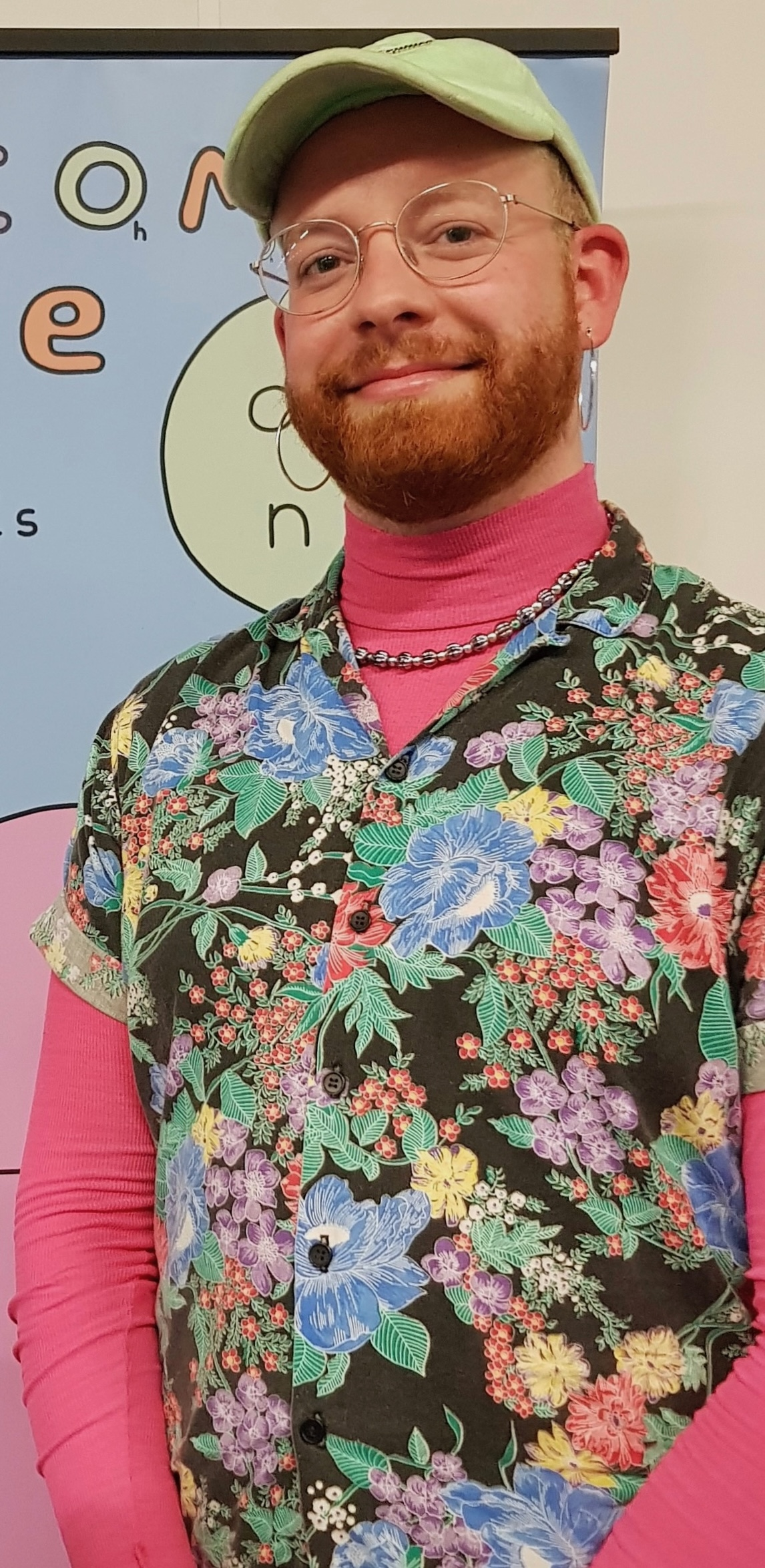
- Alex Norris at Thought Bubble 2021
- Born: Swansea, Wales
- Education: Bristol University
- Occupation: Comic artist
- Website: Official website

Alex Norris is a Welsh cartoonist known for Webcomic Name and How to Love.

== Biography ==
Alex Norris, who is from Swansea, studied English literature at Bristol University, and said that they wanted to be a poet. In an interview, they said that they drew comics as a child and would draw in lectures and published comics in the student newspaper. Norris said that they discovered webcomics during a boring office job.

Norris started their webcomic Dorris McComics while in university. Norris described the work as "weird... body horror gags [that] looked cute but were upsetting... a lot of them were about the form of comics... breaking the format". Norris said that when the South Korean company Webtoon was looking to launch its English-language service, they found Dorris McComics and asked Norris to do a comic for them, for a salary. How to Love launched on Webtoon in 2015 and ran until 2016; they followed this with Hello World! which ran from 2016 until 2018, when Norris left Webtoon.

Webcomic Name, Norris's most popular work, began in 2016, and parodies three-panel-a-day webcomic humour. All strips end with the punchline "oh no" (although a few early comics do not follow this format); as reviewer Heidi MacDonald put it, all strips are "...a panel, a complication and the final “oh no” no matter what the situation." Norris said that while doing Dorris McComics, "relatable comics" became popular, and they became frustrated with this trend and decided to parody the genre, though they say that Webcomic Name did become a "relatable comic" to many of the audience. A book collection, entitled oh no, was published in 2019 by Andrews McMeel Publishing.

== Reception ==
A reviewer for The Beat said of Webcomic Name,

"...bottom line, people like a short laugh that reflects their live as it is lived. Hence The Oatmeal, Sarah’s Scribbles and Instagram comics. Webcomic name has a nice deconstructive quality, though. So many of today’s popular humor webcomics showcase either acute personal anxiety or else mass destruction and Norris’s set-up is an effective way to frame this preoccupation... the future sucks and black humor is a logical reaction."

A reviewer for Broken Frontier called Webcomic Name "an online comics phenomenon" and said

"on occasion [it] can be profound in theme and message, juxtaposing joy and disappointment with a dexterous flourish... Man-spreading, accidental human contact on a tube carriage, and sex being observed by household pets are some of the daily incidents that readers may find recognisably funny. But [it] also captures the zeitgeist with, for example, its subtle yet cutting dissection of the idiosyncrasies of our online lives or its gentle ribbing of our dependence on technology."

== Awards ==
- 2018 Shorty Award
- 2024 School Library Association Children’s Choice Award
- 2024 ALCS Educational Writers' Award

== Legal battle ==
Beginning in 2019, Norris was in a legal battle with game publisher Golden Bell over the intellectual property rights to their webcomic.

In January 2025, Norris and Golden Bell settled their lawsuits, allowing Norris to keep the rights to their webcomic, characters, and associated copyrights, while Golden Bell retained their right to make Webcomic Name plush toys, two games, and a Webcomic Name book featuring Animals.

== Works ==
=== Webcomics ===
- Dorris McComics
- How to Love
- Hello World!
- Webcomic name

=== Books ===
- Oh No (collection of strips from Webcomic name), Andrews McMeel Publishing, 2019, ISBN 9781449492533
- How to Love: A Guide to Feelings & Relationships for Everyone, Walker Books US, 2023, ISBN 9781536217889
