= 2020 in webcomics =

Notable events of 2020 in webcomics.

== Events ==
=== Awards ===
- Eisner Awards, "Best Webcomic" won by Erica Eng's Fried Rice
- Harvey Awards, "Digital Book of the Year" won by Matt Bors' The Nib
- Ignatz Awards, "Outstanding Online Comic" won by Ariel Ries' Witchy
- Ministry of Culture, Sports and Tourism, "Today's Our Manhwa Award" won by Oh Seong-dae's Tales of the Unusual
- Next Manga Award, "Web Manga" won by Norio Sakurai's The Dangers in My Heart

=== Webcomics started ===
- January 12 — I Cross-Dressed for the IRL Meetup by Kurano
- January 25 — Ako and Bambi by HERO
- February 14 — Lost in Translation by Jjolee
- February 23 — Kiruru Kill Me by Yasuhiro Kanō
- February 28 – Mr. Boop by Alec Robbins
- April 3 – Uchi no Kaisha no Chiisai Senpai no Hanashi by Saisō
- May 16 — Excuse Me Dentist, It's Touching Me! by Sho Yamazaki
- May 25 — Omniscient Reader by sing N song, UMI, and Sleepy-C
- June 26 — Seasons of Blossom by Hongduck and Nemone
- June 30 — Kimi no Koe by Miku Morinaga
- July 26 — Everyday Host by Nimo Gotō
- October 3 — Josou o Yamerarenaku Naru Otokonoko no Hanashi by Kobashiko
- October 19 — Hazbin Hotel "The Radio Demon" (posted in its entirety)
- November 7 — Teenage Mercenary by YC and Rakyeon
- December 4 — New Normal by Akito Aihara

=== Webcomics ended ===
- Schlock Mercenary by Howard Tayler, 2000–2020
- The Sound of Heart by Jo Seok, 2006–2020
- Yumi's Cells by Lee Dong-geun 2015–2020
- Otokonoko Zuma by Crystal na Yousuke, 2016–2020
- Siren's Lament by instantmiso, 2016–2020
- Terror Man by Han Dong-Woo and Ko Jin-Ho, 2016–2020
- Sweet Home by Kim Carnby and Hwang Young-chan, 2017–2020
- Kimi ga Shinu Made Ato Hyaku Nichi by Migihara, 2018–2020
- A Smart and Courageous Child by Miki Yamamoto, 2019–2020
- Hazbin Hotel "Chapter 1: Dirty Healings", October 27, 2019 — July 7, 2020
- Hazbin Hotel "The Radio Demon", posted in its entirety on October 19, 2020
