= List of webcomics in print =

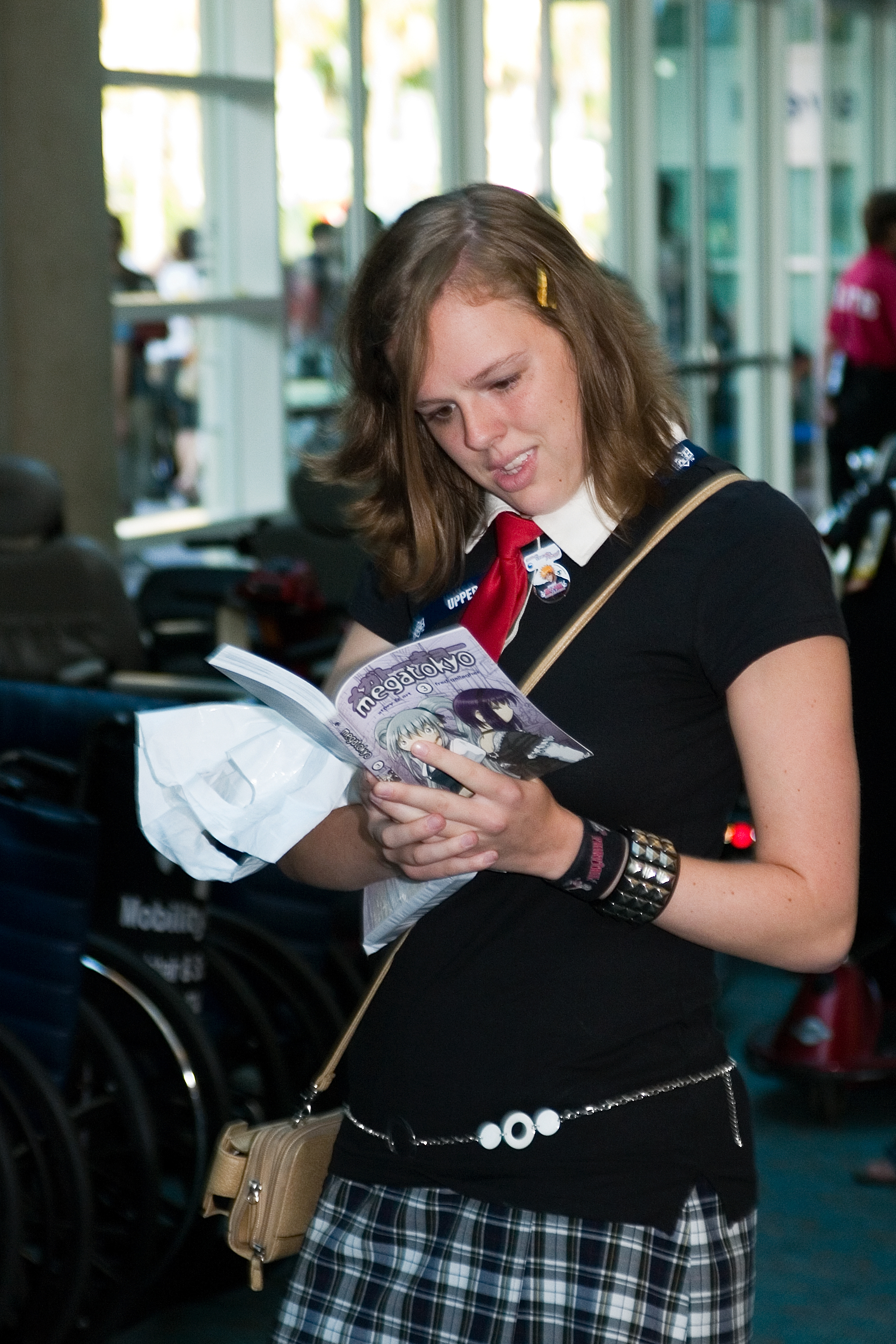
Woman reading a print volume of Megatokyo at SDCC 2008

Though webcomics are typically published primarily on the World Wide Web, some webcartoonists may get publishing deals in which comic books are created of their work. Sometimes, these books are published by mainstream comics publishers who are traditionally aimed at the direct market of regional comic books. Some webcartoonists may pursue print syndication in established newspapers or magazines. In other cases, webcomic creators decide to self-publish their work. Crowdfunding through Kickstarter is often used in order to fund such projects.

== Publication of webcomics ==
Though mainstream comic book publishers have typically been wary of licensing webcomics and adapting them into a print format, the rise of webcomics in the 2000s coincided with an American boom in graphic novels. Anna Baddeley, writing for The Guardian, stated that the established fanbase many webcomics have could give publishers a chance to attract new audiences to the print format, making webcomics an attractive focus for publishers. The traditional audience base for webcomics and print comics are vastly different, and webcomic readers do not necessarily go to bookstores. For some webcartoonists, a print release may be considered the "goal" of a webcomic series, while for others, comic books are "just another way to get the content out."

Caitlin Rosberg, writing for Paste Magazine, noted that "digital-first" comics, as found on platforms such as ComiXology, Marvel Unlimited and DC Comics' Digital First, share more aspects with printed comics than with webcomics. With the exception of two-page spreads and the occasional large-panel layout, the formatting of such digital comics are indistinguishable from their print counterparts. "Digital-first" comics can almost seamlessly transition from screen to print, as they are designed with this leap in platform in mind. Rosberg claimed that such comics are not webcomics, as webcomics are designed for consumption only on the World Wide Web, often using infinite canvas techniques or uncommon page formats. Similarly, Lauren Davis wrote for ComicsAlliance that "webcomics are not print comics that happen to appear on the web. They're a distinct animal, offer a distinct reading experience, and should be evaluated accordingly."

Webcomics have been seen by some artists as a potential new path towards syndication in newspapers, but attempts have rarely proven lucrative. According to Jeph Jacques (Questionable Content), "there's no real money" in syndication for webcomic artists. For instance Jeffrey Rowland uploaded his webcomics to the internet in order to gain constructive criticism after being rejected from various syndicates in 1999, but eventually found that he didn't need to get his work syndicated when he started selling merchandise of his webcomic Wigu. To The Boston Globe, Rowland said that "if a syndicate came to me and offered me a hundred newspapers, I would probably say no ... I'd probably make less money, with more work." When Diesel Sweeties found syndication by United Media in 2007, its creator Richard Stevens still made 80% of his income through his website. Other webcomic creators, such as R. K. Milholland (Something Positive) and Michael Terracciano (Dominic Deegan), wouldn't be able to syndicate their work in newspaper because they fill up a specific niche and wouldn't be accepted by a broader audience. Some webcartoonists have proven more successful with newspaper syndication since: in 2015, Dana Simpson syndicated her webcomic Phoebe and Her Unicorn through Universal Uclick to over 100 newspapers.

Many authors opt to self-publish their webcomic in print. In order to do so, many comic artists may use the crowdfunding service Kickstarter, which successfully funded 994 comic and graphic novel projects in 2015.

== Published webcomics ==
In 1996, David Allen launched Plan Nine Publishing, a small press American publisher focused on printing webcomics. The first webcomic Plan Nine published was Bill Holbrook's Kevin and Kell. Plan Nine published over 70 titles, printing late 1990s and early 2000s webcomics such as Sluggy Freelance, Ozy and Millie, Greystone Inn, and College Roomies from Hell!!!. Since 1997, various webcomic creators worldwide have made book deals with larger publishing companies, resulting in their webcomics being adapted into comic books and distributed to retailers.

Note: This alphabetical order ignores the first "the" in the title.

Webcomic	Publication title	Creator(s)	Publisher(s)	Initial publication	Issues	Issues total	Ref(s).
Acception		Coco “Colourbee” Ouwerkerk	Syndikaat	2016		2	
Achewood		Chris Onstad	Dark Horse Comics	2008		3	
The Adventures of Dr. McNinja		Christopher Hastings	TopatoCo	2007	3	6	
The Adventures of Dr. McNinja		Christopher Hastings	Dark Horse Comics	2011	3	6	
Always Human		Ari North	Simon & Schuster	2020		1	
American Elf		James Kochalka	Top Shelf Productions	2004		4	
Ant Comic	Ant Colony	Michael DeForge	Drawn & Quarterly	2014		1	
As the Crow Flies		Melanie Gillman	Iron Circus Comics	2017		1	
Aoi House		Adam Arnold	Seven Seas Entertainment	2006		4	
Ava's Demon		Michelle Czajkowski Fus	Skybound Entertainment	2020		1	
Axe Cop		Malachai and Ethan Nicolle	Dark Horse Comics	2011		6	
Bad Machinery		John Allison	Oni Press	2013		8	
Battlepug		Mike Norton / Allen Passalaqua / Chris Crank	Dark Horse Comics	2012		5	
Bee	Shutterbug Follies	Jason Little	Doubleday	2002	1	2	
Bee	Motel Art Improvement Service	Jason Little	Dark Horse Comics	2010	1	2	
Blindsprings		Kadi Fedoruk	Hachette	2018		2	
Bouletcorp	Notes	Boulet	Delcourt	2008		10	
Bucko		Jeff Parker / Erika Moen	Dark Horse Comics	2012		1	
Buzzer Beater		Takehiko Inoue	Shueisha	1997		4	
Check, Please!		Ngozi Ukazu	First Second Books	2018		2	
Cheshire Crossing		Andy Weir / Sarah Andersen	Ten Speed Press	2019		1	
Comical Psychosomatic Medicine		Yū Yūki	Young King	2010		15	
copper		Kazu Kibuishi	GRAPHIX	2010		1	
Cosmoknights		Hannah Templer	Top Shelf Productions	2019		1	
Crocodile in Water, Tiger on Land		Anonymous	HarperCollins India	2015			
Crossdressing Pandemic		Mikuzu Shinagawa	Kill Time Communication	2020		2	
Crossplay Love: Otaku x Punk		Tooru	Mag Garden / Seven Seas Entertainment	2019		7	
Cucumber Quest		Gigi D.G.	First Second Books	2017		4	
Cyanide & Happiness		Explosm	It Books	2009	2	4	
Cyanide & Happiness		Explosm	Boom! Studios	2014	2	4	
Demon		Jason Shiga	First Second Books	2016		4	
Diesel Sweeties		Richard Stevens III	Oni Press	2013		3	
Digger		Ursula Vernon	Sofawolf Press	2005		6	
Dinosaur Comics		Ryan North	TopatoCo	2010		3	
Evert Kwok		Eelke de Blouw and Tjarko Evenboer	Syndikaat	2006		7	
Excuse Me Dentist, It's Touching Me!		Sho Yamazaki	Shueisha	2020		4	
Fangs		Sarah Andersen	Andrews McMeel Publishing	2020		1	
Forming		Jesse Moynihan	Nobrow Press	2011		2	
FreakAngels		Warren Ellis / Paul Duffield	Avatar Press	2008		6	
General Protection Fault	Mating Call of the North American Computer Geek, Gone With the Windows, And the Geek Shall Inherit the Earth, Surreptitious Machinations, $ which spoon /usr/bin/which: no spoon in $PATH	Jeffrey T. Darlington	Plan Nine Publishing	2000	4	5	
General Protection Fault	Mating Call of the North American Computer Geek, Gone With the Windows, And the Geek Shall Inherit the Earth, Surreptitious Machinations, $ which spoon /usr/bin/which: no spoon in $PATH	Jeffrey T. Darlington	Moonbase Press	2009	1	5	
Get Your War On		David Rees	Soft Skull Press	2002	2	3	
Get Your War On		David Rees	Riverhead Books	2004	1	3	
The Glass Scientists		Sage Cotugou	Razorbill, Penguin Random House	2023	1	1	
Gunnerkrigg Court		Tom Siddell	Archaia Entertainment	2008		7	
Hark! A Vagrant	Hark! A Vagrant / Step Aside, Pops	Kate Beaton	Drawn & Quarterly	2011		2	
Heartstopper		Alice Oseman	Hachette Children's Group	2019		5	
Henchgirl		Kristen Gudsnuk	Dark Horse Comics	2017		1	
Hetalia: Axis Powers		Hidekaz Himaruya	Gentosha	2008		6	
Homestuck		Andrew Hussie	TopatoCo	2011	3	6 (Note: Books 1 and 2 from Viz republish the TopatoCo run, therefore only the Viz total is counted here.)	
Homestuck		Andrew Hussie	Viz Media	2018	6	6	
Hooky		Míriam Bonastre Tur	Houghton Mifflin Harcourt	2021		1	
hori-san to Miyamura-kun		Hero	Square Enix	2007		10	
How to Keep a Mummy		Kakeru Utsugi	Futabasha	2016		4	
I Think I Turned My Childhood Friend into a Girl		Azusa Banjo	Ichijinsha / Seven Seas Entertainment	2020		3	
I Was Kidnapped By Lesbian Pirates From Outer Space		Megan Rose Gedris	Platinum Comics	2007		6	
Inverloch		Sarah Ellerton	Seven Seas Entertainment	2006		2	
Josou o Yamerarenaku Naru Otokonoko no Hanashi		Kobashiko	Kadokawa Shoten	2021		1	
I Cross-Dressed for the IRL Meetup		Kurano	Kodansha	2020		3	
The Joy of Tech	The Best of the Joy of Tech	Liza Schmalcel / Bruce Evans	O'Reilly Media	2003		1	
Kill Six Billion Demons		Tom Parkinson-Morgan	Image Comics	2016		3	
Leaving Richard's Valley		Michael DeForge	Drawn & Quarterly	2019		1	
Ma vie est tout à fait fascinante		Pénélope Bagieu	Delcourt	2012		1	
Marine Corps Yumi		Anastasia Moreno and Takeshi Nogami	Kodansha	2012		7	
Wendy Pini's Masque of the Red Death	Masque of the Red Death	Wendy Pini	Go! Comi	2007		1	
Megatokyo		Fred Gallagher / Rodney Caston	Studio Ironcat	2003	1	6 (Note: Book 1 was first printed through Studio Ironcat and later reprinted through Dark Horse; the total count counts these as one issue.)	
Megatokyo		Fred Gallagher / Rodney Caston	Dark Horse Comics	2004	3	6	
Megatokyo		Fred Gallagher / Rodney Caston	CMX	2006	2	6	
Megatokyo		Fred Gallagher / Rodney Caston	WildStorm	2010	1	6	
Ménage à 3		Gisele Lagace / David Lumsdon	Udon Entertainment	2018		10	
Mimi & Eunice	Misinformation Wants To Be Free	Nina Paley	CreateSpace	2010		1	
Mob Psycho 100		One	Shogakukan	2012		16	
Motherlover		Lindsay Ishihiro	Iron Circus Comics	2025		1	
Mom's Cancer		Brian Fies	Abrams Books	2006		1	
Mooncakes		Suzanne Walker / Wendy Xu	Lion Forge	2019		1	
Moving Pictures		Kathryn Immonen / Stuart Immonen	Top Shelf Productions	2010		1	
My Lesbian Experience With Loneliness		Kabi Nagata	East Press / Seven Seas Entertainment	2016		1	
Nimona		ND Stevenson	HarperCollins	2015		2	
Octopus Pie		Meredith Gran	Image Comics	2016		5	
Oglaf		Trudy Cooper / Doug Bayne	TopatoCo	2011		2	
Ojisan and Marshmallow		Rekomaru Otoi	Ichijinsha	2014		4	
One-Punch Man		One / Yusuke Murata	Shueisha / Viz Media	2013		18	
Owlturd Comix	Emotions Explained with Buff Dudes	Andrew Tsyaston	Andrews McMeel Publishing	2018		1	
Parade (with Fireworks)		Mike Cavallaro	Image Comics	2007		2	
The PC Weenies	Rebootus Maximus	Krishna M. Sadasivam		2009		1	
Penny Arcade		Jerry Holkins / Mike Krahulik	Dark Horse Comics	2006	5	9	
Penny Arcade		Jerry Holkins / Mike Krahulik	Del Rey Books	2010	2	9	
Penny Arcade		Jerry Holkins / Mike Krahulik	Oni Press	2012	2	9	
The Perry Bible Fellowship	The Trial of Colonel Sweeto and Other Stories	Nicholas Gurewitch	Dark Horse Comics	2007		2	
Polar		Víctor Santos	Dark Horse Comics	2013		2	
Princess Maison		Aoi Ikebe	Shogakukan	2015		2	
Problem Sleuth		Andrew Hussie	TopatoCo	2010		5	
PvP		Scott Kurtz	Dork Storm Press	2001	1	45 (Note: PvP was printed as a series of short comic book issues, which were then collected into larger books. This resulted in a higher issue count than other long-running webcomics.)	
PvP		Scott Kurtz	Image Comics	2003	45	45	
Questionable Content		Jeph Jacques	TopatoCo	2010		6	
The Red Hook		Dean Haspiel	Image Comics	2018		2	
Red String		Gina Biggs	Dark Horse Comics	2002		3	
Rice Boy		Evan Dahm	Iron Circus Comics	2018		1	
Sabrina Online	A Decade in Black & White / The Tail of Two Decades / Baby Steps/Homecoming & Skunks Day Out	Eric Schwartz	United Publications & Distribution Ltd	2012		4	
Salamander Dream		Hope Larson	AdHouse Books	2005		1	
Sarah's Scribbles	Adulthood is a Myth / Big Mushy Happy Lump / Herding Cats	Sarah Andersen	Andrews McMeel Publishing	2016		3	
Saturday Morning Breakfast Cereal	Save Yourself, Mammal! / The Most Dangerous Game / Science: Ruining Everything Since 1543	Zach Weinersmith	Breadpig	2011		3	
Schlock Mercenary		Howard Tayler	Hypernode Press	2000		16	
Senpai wa Otokonoko		Pom	Ichijinsha	2021		1	
Serenity Rose		Aaron Alexovich	Slave Labor Graphics	2005		3	
Sinfest		Tatsuya Ishida	Dark Horse Comics	2009		2	
Sleepless Domain	The Price of Magic	Mary Cagle	Hachette	2018		1	
Sleepless Domain	The Price of Magic	Mary Cagle	Seven Seas Entertainment	2021		1	
Smile	Smile	Raina Telgemeier	GRAPHIX	2010		1	
A Softer World		Joey Comeau / Emily Horne	TopatoCo	2009	4	5	
A Softer World		Joey Comeau / Emily Horne	Breadpig	2016	1	5	
Space Boy		Stephen McCranie	Dark Horse Comics	2018		13	
Spy × Family		Tatsuya Endo	Shueisha / Viz Media	2019		9	
Strong Female Protagonist		Brennan Lee Mulligan / Lee Knox Ostertag	Top Shelf Productions	2014		2	
Sunstone		Stjepan Šejić	Image Comics	2014		6	
Sunstone		Stjepan Šejić	Top Cow Productions	2014		6	
Templar, Arizona		Spike Trotman	Iron Circus Comics	2007		4	
Tsuredure Children		Toshiya Wakabayashi	Kodansha	2012		12	
Tu mourras moins bête		Marion Montaigne	Ankama	2011	2	4	
Tu mourras moins bête		Marion Montaigne	Delcourt	2014	2	4	
Uchi no Kaisha no Chiisai Senpai no Hanashi		Saisō	Takeshobo	2020		5	
Unshelved		Gene Ambaum, Bill Barnes	Overdue Media	2004		12	
Up and Out	Super Late Bloomer: My Early Days in Transition	Julia Kaye	Andrews McMeel Publishing	2018		1	
User Friendly	User Friendly 1.0, User Friendly, Evil Geniuses in a Nutshell, The Root of All Evil, Even Grues Get Full, Ten Years of User Friendly.org	J. D. Frazer	O'Reilly Media	1999	4	5	
User Friendly	User Friendly 1.0, User Friendly, Evil Geniuses in a Nutshell, The Root of All Evil, Even Grues Get Full, Ten Years of User Friendly.org	J. D. Frazer	Manning Publications	2008	1	5	
Van Von Hunter		Mike Schwark / Ron Kaulfersch	Tokyopop	2005		3	
Witchy		Ariel Slamet Ries	Lion Forge Comics	2019		2	
Woman World		Aminder Dhaliwal	Drawn & Quarterly	2018		1	
Wondermark	Beards of Our Forefathers, Clever Tricks to Stave Off Death, Dapper Caps & Pedal-Copters	David Malki	Dark Horse Comics	2008		3	
The Wormworld Saga		Daniel Lieske	Lion Forge Comics	2018		4	
Wotakoi: Love is Hard for Otaku		Fujita	Ichijinsha / Kodansha USA	2014		11	
xkcd	xkcd: Volume 0	Randall Munroe	Breadpig	2009		1	
Yarichin Bitch Club		Ogeretsu Tanaka	Gentosha / Viz Media	2012		3	

== Webcomics syndicated in newspapers and magazines ==
Some webcomics have been regularly published in periodicals such as newspapers and magazines.

Webcomic	Creator(s)	Syndicate	Publication(s)	Size	Ref(s).
A Softer World	Joey Comeau / Emily Horne		The Guardian	"several newspapers"	
Aiura	Chama	Kadokawa Shoten	4-Koma Nano Ace / Monthly Shōnen Ace		
Big Fat Whale	Brian McFadden	Association of Alternative Newsmedia	Cleveland Free Times / The Phoenix		
Boy on a Stick and Slither	Steven L. Cloud	United Media	The Atlanta Journal-Constitution / Esquire		
Bug Bash	Hans Bjordahl		Micronews	newsletter	
Comical Psychosomatic Medicine	Yū Yūki		Young King		
Diesel Sweeties	Richard Stevens III	United Media		20 newspapers	
Fetus-X	Eric Millikin		Metro Times / Lansing State Journal		
Helen, Sweetheart of the Internet	Peter Zale	Tribune Media Services	The New York Times / New Straits Times	60 newspapers	
Idiot Box	Matt Bors	United Media	Seven Days / Funny Times		
Phoebe and Her Unicorn	Dana Simpson	Universal Uclick		100+ newspapers	
Tsuredure Children	Toshiya Wakabayashi	Kodansha	Weekly Shōnen Magazine		
User Friendly	J.D. Fraser		National Post, Linux Journal		
Van Von Hunter	Mike Schwark / Ron Kaulfersch	Universal Press Syndicate	Los Angeles Times, / The Denver Post / The Seattle Post-Intelligencer / The Detroit News / The Oregonian / The Vancouver Sun / Toronto Sun		
Wondermark	David Malki		Flak Magazine, The Onion		

== Collected works ==
From 2004 to 2011, graphic novel author and illustrator Kazu Kibuishi edited the comics anthology series Flight. Published by Image Comics and Ballantine Books, Flight featured short comics by various artists who had varying audiences online. The third book in Ted Rall's Attitude series, subtitled "The New Subversive Online Cartoonists" (2006), features interviews with and strips of 21 different webcartoonists.
