= Shiver (D. C. Simpson album) =

Studio album by D. C. Simpson
- Released: May 18, 2005
- Recorded: 2005 at D.C. Simpson's house
- Genre: Folk/Alternative
- Length: 43:50
- Label: CafePress
- Producer: D.C. Simpson

Shiver, released May 18, 2005, is the first album released by Dana Simpson, author of the webcomics Ozy and Millie and I Drew This. The album was recorded by the artist and released on CafePress.com, but the tracks have also been made available for free download.

There is also an expanded edition with an alternative cover, demos, and extra songs.

The songs on the album were written from 1999 ("Impression of You") to 2005 ("Still Nina").

== Track listing ==
All songs were written by Simpson.

1. "If I Can't Get To London"
2. "Impression Of You"
3. "From The Rain"
4. "I See"
5. "Mockingbird Song"
6. "California"
7. "We All Fall Down"
8. "Turn Away"
9. "Warm"
10. "Tin Heart"
11. "Hey Abandon"
12. "Still Nina"

== Personnel ==
- D. C. Simpson – guitar, saxophone, vocals
- Jim Clawson – bass
- Ben Yackley – keyboards
