= Nemi (disambiguation) =

Nemi is a town and commune in Rome.

Nemi may also refer to:

- Lake Nemi, located near the above town
  - Nemi ships, two ancient Roman ships salvaged from the above lake
- Neminatha, 22nd Jain Tirthankara
- Nemi (comic strip), Norwegian comic strip
- Nemi language, New Caledonian language
- Northeastern Manitoulin and the Islands, a municipality in Canada
