= Lost in Translation (disambiguation) =

Lost in Translation is a 2003 film directed by Sofia Coppola.

Lost in translation commonly refers to losses in a translation or to untranslatability.

Lost in Translation may also refer to:

== Film and television ==
- Trevor Noah: Lost in Translation, a 2015 stand-up comedy special by Trevor Noah
- "...In Translation", a 2005 episode of the TV series Lost
- "Lost in Translation", a 2006 episode 49 of the TV series The Suite Life of Zack and Cody
- "Lost in Translation" (Robin Hood), a 2009 episode of the 2006 TV series, Robin Hood
- "Lost in Translation" (Star Trek: Strange New Worlds), an episode of the second season of Star Trek: Strange New Worlds

== Literature ==
- "Lost in Translation" (poem), a 1974 poem by James Merrill
- Lost in Translation (memoir), a 1989 memoir by Eva Hoffman
- Lost in Translation (novel), a 1999 novel by Nicole Mones
- Lost in Translation (webtoon), a webtoon by Jjolee
- Lost in Translation, the third novel (2004) in The Queendom of Sol hard science fiction series by Wil McCarthy

== Music ==
- Lost in Translation (soundtrack) by Kevin Shields
- Lost in Translation (mixtape), a 2011 mixtape by Mr. Muthafuckin' eXquire
- Lost in Translation (New Politics album)
- Lost in Translation, a 1995 album by Roger Eno
- Lost in Translation, an album by Ellwood
- "Lost in Translation", a song by Apoptygma Berzerk on the 2005 album You and Me Against the World
- "Lost in Translation", a song by Frontline from the 2005 album Borrowed Time
- "Lost in Translation", a song by Of Machines on the 2009 album As If Everything Was Held in Place
- "Lost in Translation", a song by Logic from Confessions of a Dangerous Mind
- "Lost in Translation", a song by Reks from Straight, No Chaser
- "Lost in Translation", a song by The Neighbourhood

== See also ==
- "Lost and Found in Translation", a 2004 episode of the TV series Power Rangers: Dino Thunder
- "Lust in Translation", a 2007 episode of The Green Green Grass
- Lost in the Translation, a 1994 album by Axiom Ambient
- Lost in the Translation, an album by Jeff Scott Soto
- Lost in Transmission
