= Lise Myhre =

Norwegian cartoonist

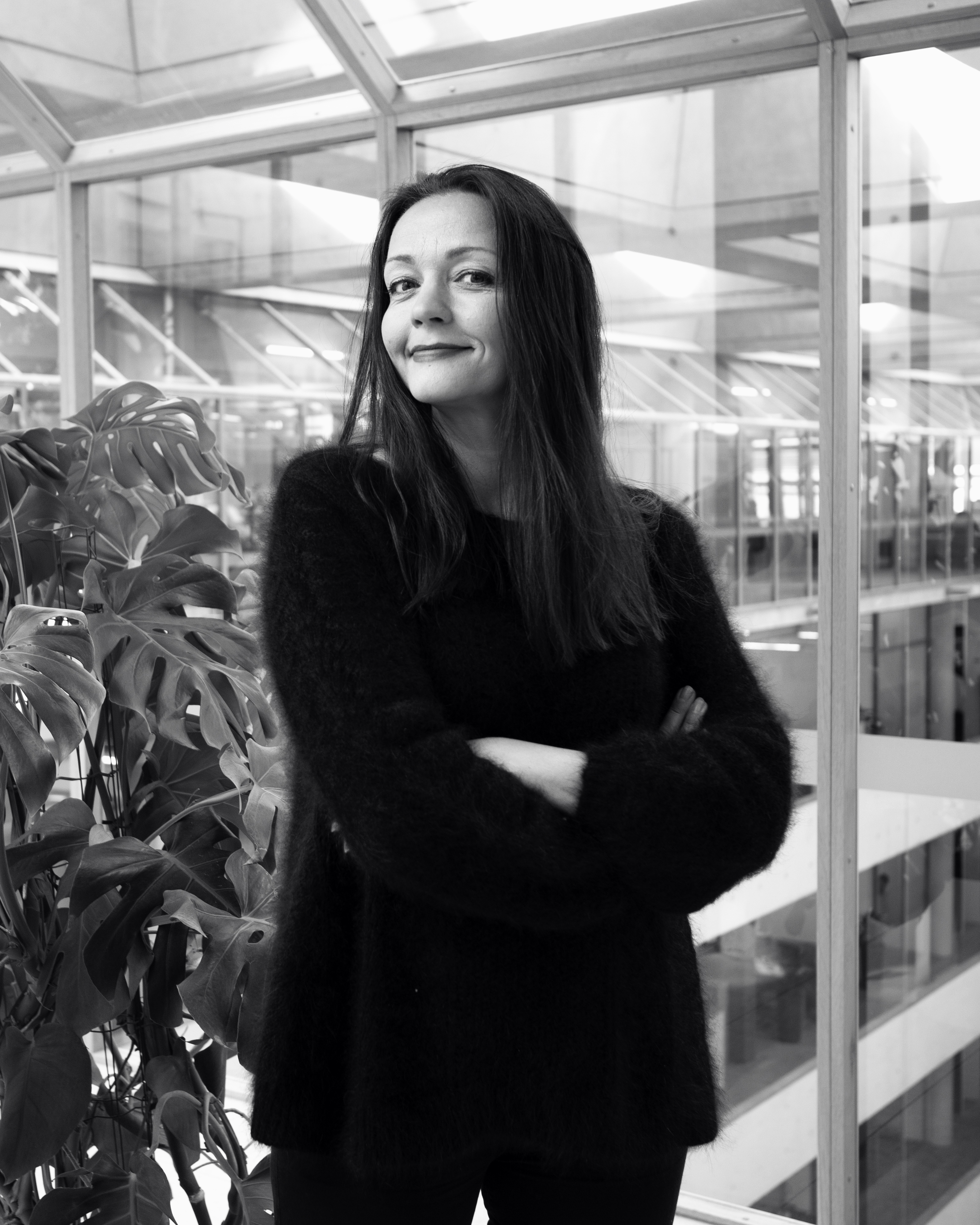
Lise Myhre_Gyldendal

Lise Myhre is a Norwegian cartoonist. Her most famous cartoon is Nemi.

== Biography ==
Myhre is from Lørenskog, just outside of Oslo, and grew up at Skedsmokorset. She studied graphic design and art history at Santa Monica College of Art in California after finishing high school, and moved to Oslo in 1995, where she continued her studies at the Mercantile Institute. Myhre started working as an illustrator from her teenage years, creating her first comic strips in 1996. These were published in various outlets, including the free newspaper Planetarium C, the Norwegian Mad, and Pyton. Her first comics were without recurring characters, before she created Anne And – a series that started as a tribute to Charlie Christensen’s Arne And (which is itself a parody of Donald Duck) – and the series M.P., which was published in Larson’s Gale Verden. In 1997, Nemi was born, initially as a random character in cartoons friendly mocking goth culture, and soon as the main character in the series Den sorte siden (also published in Larson’s Gale Verden).

Nemi quickly became popular and debuted as a daily strip in Dagbladet in 1999. That same year, Lise Myhre won the Raptus Comic Festival’s debutant prize. In 2002, she received the Oslo City Art Prize for her “outstanding contribution to Oslo’s art scene.” Nemi got its own magazine in 2003, when Myhre changed publishers from Bladkompaniet to Egmont. Since its launch, the magazine has been centered around a theme, with articles written by experts or others with an interest in the subject. It also includes various Norwegian and foreign backup comics in addition to Nemi strips. The backup comics have varied over the years, but Ronja Svenning Berge’s Ronja has been featured since the beginning.

Nemi is one of the largest commercial comic successes in Norway and has been translated into several languages. At its peak, the series has been published in about 150 newspapers and websites. Since 2018, Nemi has been published by Gyldendal Norwegian Publishing House. In 2019, Myhre won the SPROING prize for the series.

Lise Myhre has also illustrated poems by, among others, Edgar Allan Poe and André Bjerke using characters from Nemi. Several of the poems were published in the anthology Drømmesvart (Gyldendal, 2018) and in Nattlys (2019). Myhre has also illustrated album covers (including for Gothminister), textbooks and horror books, in addition to a number of factual books written by Synnøve Borge. In connection with the 100th anniversary of comics in Norway in 2011, she was one of four comic artists whose works were featured on an official Norwegian postage stamp.
