= Sinfest =

American webcomic

- Author: Tatsuya Ishida
- Website: www.sinfest.xyz
- Current status/schedule: Daily
- Launch date: October 16, 1991 (Daily Bruin newspaper); January 17, 2000 (web publication)
- Genre(s): Comedy, satire

Sinfest is a long-running daily American comic strip by Tatsuya Ishida. It originally appeared in the University of California, Los Angeles' Daily Bruin student newspaper between 1991 and 1994. Ishida relaunched the comic strip in 2000 by self-publishing it online as a webcomic. Sinfest has also been collected into five printed books; three were self-published by Ishida between 2002 and 2005 and two were published by Dark Horse Comics in 2009 and 2011.

The comic has received mixed reactions over the years due to its treatment of topics such as race, feminism, politics, and sexism. Its themes and tone have shifted significantly over time, with the 1990s incarnation often regarded as particularly crass. During the 2000s, the comic was described as frequently referencing pop culture and using black comedy, a style that makes light of subjects normally considered serious or painful to discuss. In 2008, it began incorporating more overt political and ideological themes, including elements of radical feminism from 2011 onward. In the 2020s, Sinfest increasingly embraced conspiratorial and antisemitic themes; Ishida was banned from platforms such as Patreon and Twitter for violating policies on hateful content.

== History ==
=== Early years ===
Ishida has said he wanted to create comics after reading a Peanuts paperback as a child, due to "the simplicity and solitary nature of the medium."

Sinfest was initially published by the University of California, Los Angeles' Daily Bruin from October 16, 1991, to 1994. This first Sinfest comic included a "full spread artist's rendition of an opened vagina," with Ishida saying that he created this comic as "a response to an issue of a feminist newsletter." Publishers Weekly described these strips as even "raunchier and harsher" than the "harsh" Sinfest comics from the early 2000s. Ishida debuted the character Slick in 1991, with the character saying that UCLA was "obsessed with admitting underqualified minorities for the sake of diversity." In 1994, Sinfest included what Ishida has described as "the original 'Matriarchy' series," set in a "society ruled by women" where Slick starts a "pro-men guerilla insurgency group."

Following this phase of Sinfest, Ishida briefly worked as penciller for Dark Horse Comics' G.I. Joe Extreme and Godzilla (published 1995–6). (Note: Ishida said that he "botched" this job, saying that "several [of his] pages were so poorly drawn they had to get another guy to redo them entirely".)

=== Transition to web publication ===
In 2000, Ishida taught himself HTML, put together a GeoCities web page, and started uploading Sinfest strips seven days per week. By April 2000, Sinfest was being hosted on the webcomics site Keenspot. Author Sean Kleefeld described some of the earliest strips, including from the first week as a webcomic, as using "racial stereotypes" that are "racially insensitive at best" and "insulting and degrading," including depicting a "Blaxsplotation Funk Bible" with anti-African American racist fried chicken stereotypes. Ishida, who lives a private life and has little interaction with his readership, has said that the political views included in Sinfest have led to reader complaints since its early editions. Writing for The Comics Journal, comics-writer Shaenon Garrity has described how the comic has included "a lot of offensive material over the years, including racial caricatures, sex and drug humor, and lots of sexism." Writing for The Comics Beat, journalist Laura Sneddon stated that, during this period, "originally the comic was indeed a Sin-fest, stuffed with black comedy and poking outrage for humour". Paste magazine described it as a four-panel comic strip relying on pop culture references and dark humor. Sinfest won two Web Cartoonists' Choice Awards in 2001 and two more in 2003. Journalist Ryan Broderick describes the mid-2000s comics as being "against the Iraq War" and the comic by the late 2000s as including anti-porn "SWERF or 'sex worker exclusionary radical feminist'" ideology. Ishida has said that he maintained a seven-day-a-week schedule during the first seven years through "coffee and revenge".

According to Garrity, the comic's art resembles American newspaper comics and Japanese manga chibi style, and it can get away with offensive material for being "darn cute". Garrity and Kleefeld have both commended the artwork. Early characters included Slick, a main-character and a hedonistic womanizer, resembling Bill Watterson's Calvin, described by Ishida as a "Pimp Ninja, Calvin rip-off." In the 2003-2004 comics, Slick runs for President. His side-kick was "it girl" Monique, described by Ishida as "age:16," a "SlutTrampHo" and "jail bait." Garrity describes her as a "sexy coffeehouse poet" and recounts her spending "one of her earliest strips in a bikini, showing her ass to the reader at Slick’s command". Other early characters included God and the Devil.

Ishida self-published three print volumes of Sinfest between 2002 and 2005. Two volumes of early Sinfest have been published in print by Dark Horse Comics. The first of these was released in mid-2009 and reprints the first year of the webcomic. Dark Horse planned another book release in late 2009, but that book was cancelled due to the poor sales of the first book. The second volume, a 2011 collection titled Viva la Resistance, covers the webcomic's run from 2003 to 2004. Sinfest has also appeared in the Norwegian comic magazine Nemi.

=== Growth in sociopolitical and radical feminist themes ===
Over its first decade as a webcomic, the comic evolved to include a large cast of regular characters commenting on such themes as organized religion, American exceptionalism, and economic insecurity.

During the 2008 United States presidential election, Sinfest incorporated even more political themes. Critic R. C. Harvey wrote in The Comics Journal in 2009 that it was the best webcomic around, and that "It borders on the blasphemous, but uproariously so. Surely we deserve to be offended in so hilarious a fashion." Ishida has said that he switches between characters and situations in his webcomic "pretty much on a whim", saying that "the longer storylines help to pull it all together." In 2011, Ishida started to produce weekly strips in color on Sundays, giving readers, in his words, "something extra fun and engaging".

In October 2011, the comic abruptly shifted in tone, focusing heavily on radical feminist themes. Ishida introduced new characters to explore these new themes, and to confront the humor in older strips, tackling issues such as slut-shaming, misogyny, and street harassment. In this period, Monique cut her hair and began questioning gender roles and patriarchy as a system of oppression, the latter depicted as a Matrix-like oppressive simulated reality. Sneddon compared the comic's themes in this period to I Was Kidnapped By Lesbian Pirates From Outer Space, another feminist webcomic, noting that Sinfest had a larger audience inherited from before the change in direction; however, some of these old fans were outraged by the changes to Monique.

Garrity said in 2012 that "raunchy strips about strippers are followed by cute cat-and-dog gags are followed by religious humor are followed by autobio strips are followed by shit-stirring political cartoons are followed by spoken-word poetry are followed by lessons in drawing Japanese kanji, one of Sinfest's signature running features," and that "Sinfest is always, first and foremost, about what Ishida wants to cartoon at any given moment." PC Magazine listed Sinfest among the best webcomics of 2015. Ishida said in 2017, "Over the years [Sinfest] has gone through many changes, to the delight of some and dismay of others. I hope to continue polarizing audiences for many years to come." Kleefeld wrote in 2020 that "The message of social justice through radical feminism is still the strip's raison d'etre, but it's a message of safety and inclusion rather than one of outreach and education."

=== Shift towards conspiracy theories and antisemitism ===
A partial 2025 Sinfest panel depicting a caped Adolf Hitler protecting a blonde child from figures representing Judaism, communism, and pedophilia. The halo, a Black Sun, is a symbol of the esoteric neo-Nazi conspiracies increasingly referenced by the strip.

In April 2022, Broderick noted the addition of "long-running internet conspiracies, like the Illuminati and the Bilderberg group" (by the early 2010s), the MAGA movement (2016), anti-trans storylines (2019), and QAnon (2021), and opined that "as of now, the comic is a Christian fascist slurry of random internet nonsense." In September 2022, Ishida wrote that he was locked out of social media site Twitter for "hateful conduct", in reference to his September 3 strip. In December 2022, Ishida wrote that crowdfunding website Patreon, where he had had an account for four years, had banned him for promoting "sentiments of discrimination based on gender identity or sexual orientation."

In 2024, Kleefeld wrote that when catching up on Sinfest strips, he "wasn't understanding them", and that the comic had gone into a "downward spiral". In a subsequent 2026 article, he stated that Sinfest had entered a daily, months-long arc of "conspiratorial anti-semitism" that regularly vilified Jews, glorified Adolf Hitler, and promoted "increasingly unhinged" conspiracy theories such as those regarding the Rothschild family and the Kalergi Plan. According to Kleefeld, Sinfest's historical negationism of World War II and its straightforward depiction of Hitler as a heroic opponent of Jews separated it from mainstream portrayals of neo-Nazi perspectives (such as Mark Waid's Red Skull), and suggested a sincere and concerning alignment with antisemitic views.

== Awards and nominations ==
Year	Award	Category	Result	Reference
2001	Web Cartoonists' Choice Awards	Best Female Character	Won	
2001	Web Cartoonists' Choice Awards	Best Other Character	Won	
2003	Web Cartoonists' Choice Awards	Outstanding Comic	Nominated	
2003	Web Cartoonists' Choice Awards	Outstanding Black and White Art	Nominated	
2003	Web Cartoonists' Choice Awards	Outstanding Line Art	Won	
2003	Web Cartoonists' Choice Awards	Outstanding Short Form Comic	Nominated	
2003	Web Cartoonists' Choice Awards	Outstanding Gag Comic	Won	
2004	Web Cartoonists' Choice Awards	Outstanding Black and White Art	Nominated	
2004	Web Cartoonists' Choice Awards	Outstanding Character	Nominated	
2004	Web Cartoonists' Choice Awards	Outstanding Short Form Comic	Nominated	
2005	Web Cartoonists' Choice Awards	Outstanding Short Form Comic	Honorable Mention	
2008	Web Cartoonists' Choice Awards	Outstanding Short Form Comic	Nominated	
