= Em (comics) =

Serialised cartoon strip

Em is a cartoon strip written by Maria Smedstad, which depicts the life of a young woman and her friends living in London. It was first published in thelondonpaper on 30 October 2006, and appeared daily until the paper's demise on 18 September 2009. It was then published in The Sun (newspaper) until January 2010. The strip has continued to be published online through Maria Smedstad's website, and in Nemi's Norwegian and Swedish comic book, and since January 2012 has been published daily in Scandinavian paper, Aftonbladet.

The same cartoon style has been used by Maria in her illustrations for Reb Williams' book, website and blog, and also on a website supporting green initiatives in London.
