= Hooky (webcomic) =

Fantasy adventure webcomic by Míriam Bonastre Tur

- Webtoon Originals release illustration
- Author: Míriam Bonastre Tur
- Website: Hooky on Webtoon Originals
- Current status/schedule: Completed
- End date: 2023
- Publishers: Webtoon; Houghton Mifflin Harcourt (print)
- Genres: Fantasy; adventure
- Rating: 9.80 Stars on Webtoon as of November 2021

Hooky is a fantasy adventure webcomic written and illustrated by Spanish author Míriam Bonastre Tur. Originally serialized as a webtoon on Naver Corporation's Webtoon app from 2015 to 2020, Hooky was eventually released in print by Houghton Mifflin Harcourt in 2021.

The series follows two young twin witches from a powerful family, Dani and Dorian Wytte. After missing the bus to magic school, they eventually get wrapped up in a prophesied war between witches and regular people. The webcomic began on Webtoon's user-published service Challenge League, now called Canvas. Bonastre Tur developed it from a doodle of two twin witches while in art school, in order to enter Challenge League's first competition for formal publication. Though she did not win, Hooky was eventually selected for release as a Webtoon Original in April 2015.

The webtoon has seen largely positive reviews since its release, with praise for its characters and art style. The graphic novel release of Hooky placed on The New York Times Best Seller list in October 2021.

== Plot ==
The story follows main characters Daniela "Dani" and Dorian Wytte, two 12-year-old witches who miss the bus to magic school. Rather than returning home, the pair opts to find a mentor, initially selecting their Aunt Hilde. After failing the mission given to them by their aunt, the pair begins to search for a new mentor. On a train, the kids meet Nico, a rambunctious non-magical boy who lives with a soothsayer named Pendragon. Nico convinces the Wyttes to meet Pendragon, who in turn agrees to take the kids on as students. Monica, the princess of the kingdom, eventually joins as a fourth student. Initially seeking Pendragon as soothsayer while on a journey to save her captured fiancé Prince William, she decides living with the witch is more worthwhile to her quest.

The series is set in a fantasy world with historic conflict between non-magical people and witches. Though under the current king's rule, witch-hunting is illegal, animosity between the two groups remains. Unbeknownst to Dani and Dorian, powerful witches, including the pair's aunt and parents, are plotting to kill the current king and replace him with a witch, as a means to create a new era for witches.

== Characters ==
- Daniela "Dani" Wytte – The female protagonist of the series. Bubbly and extroverted, she's more social than her twin brother Dorian, as well as a skilled broom rider. She does, however, struggle with magic, finding it difficult to produce spells. When she does, they oftentimes turn out dangerous and destructive, to Dani's dismay. She is the daughter of Hans and Angela Wytte and younger sister to Damien Wytte.
- Dorian Wytte – The male protagonist of the series. Highly studious and talented at magic, he is able to produce powerful spells with ease. Dorian, however, cannot ride a broom and is significantly more socially awkward than his twin sister Dani. Dorian is the second son of Hans and Angela Wytte, the younger brother of Damien Wytte, and heir to the Wytte family.
- Monica – The princess of the kingdom who sets out on a quest to save her captured husband-to-be, William. She begins the series self-centered, ignorant, and suspicious of witches, though she eventually befriends Dani and Dorian and begins to learn how to use magic herself.
- Nico – A rambunctious and extroverted kid and adoptive son of Pendragon. Nico beings the series with low self-esteem, growing jealous of Mark's popularity and Dorian's skill as a witch, causing Nico to hate the former and tease the latter. Originally thought to be a non-magic person, Nico eventually learns he is a witch.
- Damien Wytte – The estranged eldest son of the Wytte family, Damien is a highly powerful witch, intelligent and skilled in combat. At the start of the series, Damien already joined the royal court and serves the king, as well as Princess Monica. He is aloof, quiet, and curt.
- Mark Evans – A young son of a baker who works at his father's bakery. He is kind and helpful, as well as a childhood friend (and supposed rival) of Nico. He eventually befriends Dani, Dorian, and Monica. Unbeknownst to him, Dani develops a crush on him.
- William – A prince and fiancé to Monica. An optimistic person but unskilled fighter, William desires to become stronger and a stereotypical prince worthy of Monica's affections. He, like the other princes, was captured and imprisoned by the witches.
- Aisha – A young princess and younger sister to Amir. She is highly intelligent and dedicated to her kingdom. She was captured at the floating rock along with the princes.
- Pendragon – A soothsayer witch with clairvoyance. Pendragon foresees the outcome of the witches' plot and, in an attempt to stop it, takes Dani and Dorian in as students.
- Hans Wytte – The arrogant patriarch of the Wytte household, and one of the most powerful witches. He was born into the Wytte family, an old, highly respected witch family known for their power. Father of Dani, Dorian, and Damien Wytte. Husband to Angela Wytte.
- Angela Wytte – Wife of Hans Wytte. She is usually very quiet and calm, worrying mostly about her kids. She is also, however, highly powerful and willing to use that power when deemed necessary. Mother of Dani, Dorian, and Damien Wytte.
- Donato - The former pet dragon of Dorian Wytte .
- Hilde Wytte – The sister of Hans and biological member of the prestigious Wytte family. She is highly intelligent, calculating, and extremely powerful. Aunt of Dani, Dorian, and Damien Wytte.
- Amir – A carefree, extroverted, intelligent prince and older brother to Aisha. He was imprisoned with the other princes before escaping with Damien and William.
- Alex – An extroverted witch, musician, and magic school dropout who helps Dani, Dorian, Nico and Monica during the witches sabbath, befriending them. Dies at a party around the palace.
- Ivy – One of Monica's ladies-in-waiting, close friend of Monica, and younger cousin of William.
- Anne – The older of Monica's ladies-in-waiting, and a close friend of Monica.
- Noah – A witch, close friend, and bandmate of Alex. He is the more talkative one of Alex's friends.
- Barry – A witch, close friend, and bandmate of Alex. He is the less talkative one of Alex's friends, and generally drives their van.
- Prison Head – An unnamed witch who heads the prison on the floating rock. He accuses the Wyttes of treason after Dorian attempts to steal a dragon egg.
- Carlo – A fire-tongue frog adopted by Dorian.
- Minino – Dani's pet cat and spirit of darkness.

== Development ==
Bonastre Tur's initial Inktober sketch of Dani and Dorian as the "witch siblings."

Author Míriam Bonastre Tur first sketched main characters Dani and Dorian Wytte, then unnamed, as part of an Inktober challenge in early 2014. At the time, she was at student at Escola Joso, an art school in Barcelona. Finding them enjoyable to draw, she became "obsessed with them" and drew them repeatedly throughout the month of November. Eventually, Bonastre Tur decided to come up with a story for the characters. One of her earliest ideas for the story was the premise: two magical kids missing the bus for school and eventually becoming embroiled in an evil plot. A few weeks later, she had developed the main characters and their relationships, the major plot beats and twists, and a complete loose structure of the story. Some early panels were drawn as class assignments. The character of Carlo, a frog who spits fire, was inspired by and named after a friend of Bonastre Tur. When writing Hooky, she felt bad about making Dorian lose his dragon egg, and Carlo, a classmate, suggested she give him a pet "dragon frog" to make up for it.

Bonastre Tur drew early episodes as a regular comic before adapting it to the webtoon (scrolling) style. Initially, she found the vertical, single-page style difficult, as she was used to the sheet-based style of print comics. However, after some practice, Bonastre Tur became more fond of it. She liked that, in digital comics, readers do not get an overview of pages while reading them, making surprising or dramatic panels more effective. She also appreciated how she could create extremely long panels, or "bird's-eye view panels," that allow readers to "see the entire scene and move in space and time with the characters as you scroll down." She compared them to splash pages in traditional publishing, but without the limitations of print. The art style of Hooky is simplified from Bonastre Tur's usual one, allowing her to focus on the characters' expressions and allow for more lightweight character movement. She also stated it gives her more room to draw detailed backgrounds.

In an interview with Webtoon in 2019, Bonasatre Tur cited Harry Potter and Avatar: The Last Airbender as inspirations when conceptualizing Hooky. She particularly liked that both were fantasy stories starring children and teenagers with an emphasis on their dynamics, friendships, and heartwarming aspects. Her intention was to emulate their happy, magical worlds and then to "destroy it with drama and darkness." Other works cited as influences include Fruits Basket, Kiki's Delivery Service, Ojamajo Doremi, Fullmetal Alchemist, and Kaoru Mori's work (Emma and A Bride's Story). Bonastre Tur stated that she has "a tendency to obsess over specific works during periods of [her] life" and selected influences that excited her when she was young. With Hooky, she intended to create a comic that both her younger, "fangirl" self and current adult self could enjoy.

== Publication ==
=== Online ===
In early 2015, Webtoon's self-publishing service Challenge League, now called Canvas, hosted its first-ever competition for formal publication on Webtoon's "Originals" label. At the suggestion of a friend, Bonastre Tur developed and published Hooky on Challenge League and entered into the contest. Though she did not place, Bonastre Tur continued working on and regularly updating the comic. Webtoon eventually approached her a few months later for a formal release under the Originals label. The original Challenge League page was wiped with a notice of its formal publication on March 22, 2015, and the first episode of Hooky was released as a Webtoon Original on April 10, 2015. The series updated weekly on Fridays. Bonastre Tur initially anticipated for the webcomic to have around 100 episodes, but the estimate later grew to 200 as the series continued. The series concluded with its 222nd episode on January 9, 2020, with a bonus Q&A published on January 16.

While working on the webtoon, Bonastre Tur created the script, storyboard, and roughly 40-60 full-color panels in 5–6 days. At one point, she reached up to 70, but decided to scale back. Starting in 2017, she began another art-related job in addition Hooky. Her day functioned as follows: "I get up at six in the morning, catch the train at seven thirty and go to Barcelona to work. I get home at five in the afternoon and work until ten on Hooky." She also worked during weekends. Webtoon allowed her relative creative freedom with the project—as long as she hit a minimum threshold of 25-30 panels a week and did not include sex or drugs, she was allowed to do anything.

=== Print ===
In January 2021, Webtoon, Houghton Mifflin Harcourt, and Míriam Bonastre Tur announced plans to release the first 71 chapters of Hooky in a graphic novel format. The book was set for release on September 7, 2021, and would feature updated English prose and additional bonus content. The graphic novel release features thirty chapters with an additional extra chapter. For the release, Bonastre Tur had to redraw the first sixty pages (first ten Webtoon episodes) of Hooky, as the initial illustrations were on a previous, broken laptop. She also adapted the webcomic to print herself, reformatting pages as she saw fit. The process involved laying out the pages, cutting parts of the story, and adding panel fragments to fit properly in the layouts. A second print volume was later announced with a September 2022 release date.

A Spanish edition of the graphic novel was released in January 2021 release via Planeta de Libros.

==== Publication history ====
No.	Release date	ISBN
1	September 7, 2021	978-0-358-46830-1
2	September 6, 2022	978-0-358-69309-3
3	September 5, 2023	978-0-358-69357-4

== Reception ==
=== Critical reception ===
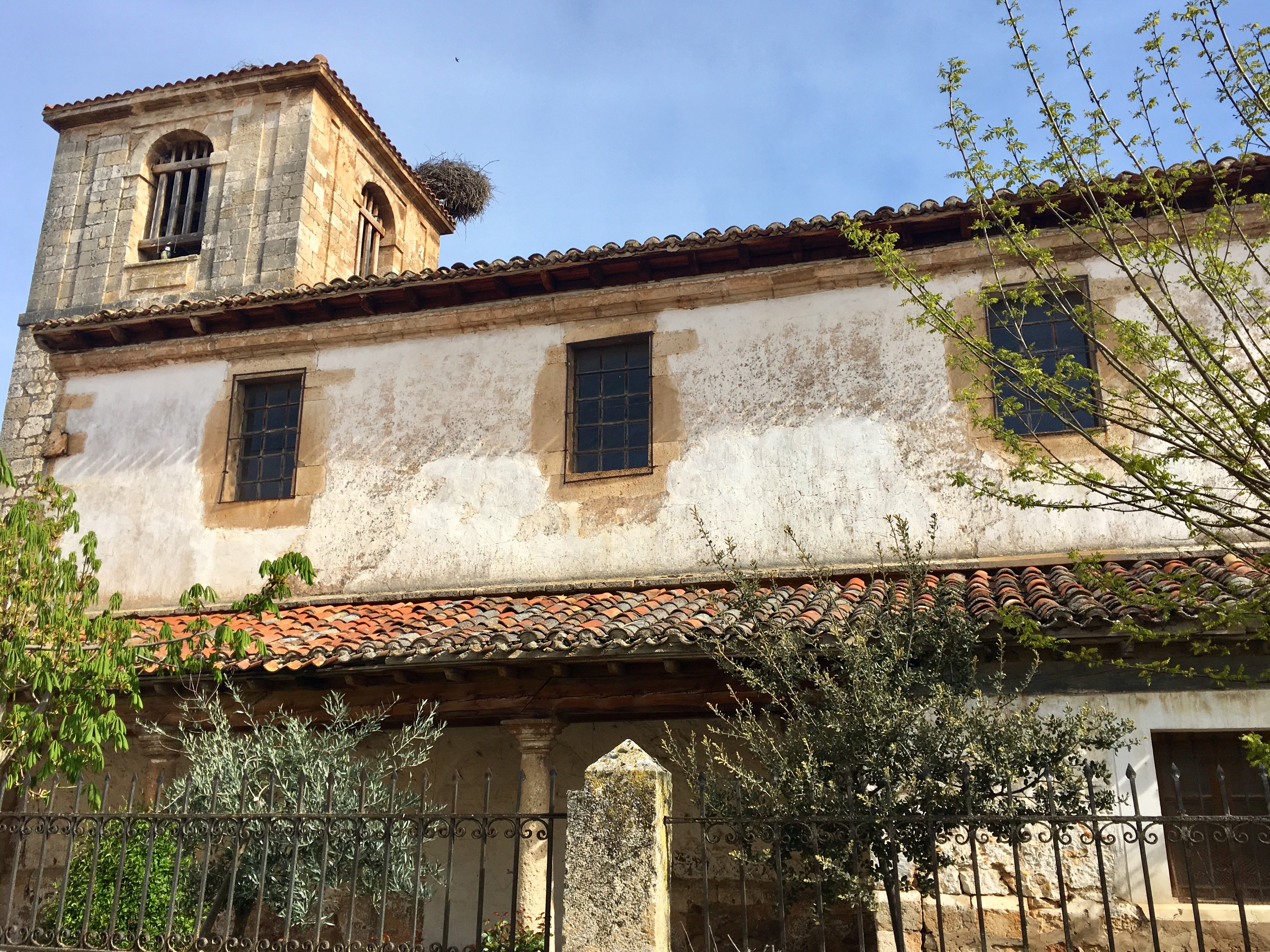
Hooky has received praise for its locations inspired by rural Spanish architecture.

The series has received generally positive reviews, with praise for its art, characters, and world building, but criticism for its English translation. Kirkus Reviews wrote that the book's "central conflict plays with the ideas of good and evil as well as biases and assumptions" and that the characters "grapple with self-doubts and questions of self-worth." It praised the "energetic, manga-style art" and the "dramatic color palette," as well as the fast-paced nature of the book. Writing for Booklist, critic Sara Smith praised the characters, writing that "most of the characters are compelling and sympathetic" but noted that "some readers might find some of their motivations to be somewhat trite." She also complimented the artwork, calling it "beautifully and brightly colored with lovely, atmospheric details." In a positive review for Geek Girl Authority, writer Julia Roth stated that "the series includes a colorful cast of characters" and it "is sure to provide you with an unforgettable adventure." Hayley Andrews of Comic Book Resources suggested the series to fans of fantasy manga, writing that "Hooky is both heartwarming and heartbreaking, similar to many amazing anime, but well worth reading."

Elias Rosner of Multiversity Comics, in an in-depth review of Hooky for the platform's "Webcomics Worth Watching" series, wrote that the worldbuilding in Hooky "created a massive story that only gets more interesting with each new episode" and called central characters Dani and Dorian "endearing." Bonastre Tur's artwork, in particular its detail and Spanish-inspired architecture, was praised. Panel layouts, which Rosner noted as "boxy," were criticized, as was the grammatical mistakes in early chapters. In a mixed review for WomenWriteAboutComics, author Claire Napier noted Hooky's artwork as "very attractively drawn, [...] with some very nice and enticing layouts and diagrammatic panel choices," however, she found the grammatical errors distracting. On the grammatical issues, Napier wrote that the webcomic's "lines are often badly garbled, stripping any sense of character from the voice and making the pages seem sterile." In a Spanish-language review for Deculture, reviewer Suzume Mizuno wrote that "the characters develop slowly but have room for their own growth" and noted that "it is worth highlighting the villains" whose motivations are not "black or white." Mizuno also complimented the series' balance of slice-of-life and action elements.

=== Popularity ===
As of July 2023, Hooky has 106.8 million unique readers and over 1 million subscribers. As of August 2021, the hashtag "#HookyCosplay" has over 1.7 million views on TikTok. The print edition of Hooky placed fifteenth on The New York Times Best Seller list in October 2021, under the graphic books and manga category. As of 2017, Hooky's largest readership is in the United States, followed by Indonesia, Spain, Mexico, and Brazil.

== See also ==
- List of webcomics in print
- List of webcomics with LGBT characters
