= Mr. Boop =

Satirical webcomic

- The first strip
- Author: Alec Robbins
- Website: https://mrboop.net/
- Current status/schedule: Concluded on January 1st, 2021
- Launch date: February 28, 2020
- Preceded by: Show Me Less Like This
- Followed by: Crime Hot

Mr. Boop is a satirical webcomic created by Alec Robbins about him being married to Betty Boop. The comic launched on February 28, 2020. The comic comprises four "books" made up of 216 strips, several videos, and a visual novel.

== Background ==
Robbins enjoyed the notion that a character designed as a sex symbol was now mostly remembered by grandmothers.

Robbins' comedic style was influenced by a company he works for, Abso Lutely Productions, especially Jon Benjamin Has a Van, The Birthday Boys and Nathan for You.

Book III features a meta-narrative about Betty Boop's father breaking up the marriage between Alec and Betty as it breaches copyright law. The arc was fuelled by a "scare" Robbins had with copyright infringement, combined with a want to discuss other topics.

Robbins had his reservations about the ending, unsure if he was sending out the right message. He said that he did not want its message to be "it's bad to fall into fantasy worlds and enjoy them."

== Plot ==
The strip is, supposedly, autobiographical.

=== Book I: "My Wife Is Betty Boop" ===
Alec Robbins is happily married to Betty Boop. Bugs Bunny attempts to kill Alec so that he can marry Betty, but Alec talks things out with Bugs. Alec visits a bar and tells the bartender, Sonic the Hedgehog, about this. Sonic suggests having a threesome between Alec, Betty, and Bugs, as reconciliation. This happens, and then Alec and Betty have orgies with fictional characters from other franchises. (Note: Robbins used characters that "people have well-known sexual obsessions with online," such as Jessica Rabbit or Gardevoir. He said that his inclusion of Ranma Saotome was personal, as the character resonated with him when he was young.) Sonic, angry at not being invited to one, shoots Alec from afar.

=== Book II: "God Is A Woman, And She's My Wife" ===
Sonic is sent to jail. Alec enters a coma, and hallucinates that he has entered the afterlife, where Betty is god. She sends him to a world where everything is the same, except that Betty never married him. Betty waits beside Alec's hospital bed, and after almost a year, Alec awakens from his coma. He forgives Sonic, and calls the prison to ask for his release. A prison guard brings Sonic to Alec, and Sonic, Alec, Betty, and Bugs have sex in Alec's house.

In the "real world", which takes a less cartoonish style, Elizabeth talks with a friend about "Mr. Boop" while reading it.

=== Book III: "Cease & Exist" ===
Betty's father, "Mr. Boop", issues a cease and desist to Alec, which says that he and Betty must divorce or be sent to prison for copyright violations. With much reluctance, they divorce; the title of the strip changes to "Mr. Robbins". A week later, Betty is held in handcuffs and forced to act in a cartoon. After her filming session, Alec proposes marriage again to Betty. Mr. Boop catches them, and he sues Alec; as a result, the comic strip is gradually replaced with all-black panels.

Book III concludes with two short videos. The first is an interview with "The Strip Club", a fictional talk show, where Alec apologizes for lying about being married to Betty Boop. The second features appearances from Tim Robinson, Mara Wilson, Justin McElroy, and many others, forgiving Alec for his lies.

In the "real world", Elizabeth reads the final strip of Book III. Having looked at Alec's selfies, she develops romantic feelings for him.

=== Book IV: "Mr. Mr. Boop" ===
In the "real world", Alec says that "Mr. Boop" has concluded, and the strip will become a comic that depicts his daily life, titled "Mr. Mr. Boop".

In a grocery store, Alec runs into Elizabeth; she recognizes him, and they begin a romantic relationship. While together, Alec calls Elizabeth "Betty", alters what she says in the comic to be more flattering to him, and draws her to resemble Betty Boop more and more. In the strip, Alec proposes to a Elizabeth who looks almost exactly like Betty, and during their wedding, she says that she will change her name to Betty Boop. The strip reverts to the world of "Mr. Boop", and Alec and Betty constantly reassure themselves that they are happy and their lives are perfect.

Bugs suddenly gets the idea to kill Alec so that he can marry Betty. He dismisses it, but suspects that something is up. He kidnaps Alec and demands answers about the world, believing it all fake; he remembers the events in Books I and II. Alec asserts that the world is real and exactly as it should be. Betty walks in and affirms Bugs's suspicions, and says that she is not Betty Boop.

In a finale video, "real world" Alec looks at his drawing tablet with Mr. Boop on screen, and cries. In the "Mr. Boop" world, Betty rises from the ground, and her body cracks open, revealing a floating Elizabeth. Back in the "real world", "Mr. Fleischer" of Fleischer Studios (the studio that created Betty Boop) writes an email to Alec on his infringement of their intellectual property. He responds with an overly apologetic letter.

The video ends with a clip of Alec walking off the set of "The Strip Club". For a short moment, a nude person, with their face buried in their hands, is seen on the chair Alec was just sitting on. (Note: The print release differs in the ending. In it, Alec fades away from the set; he does not walk off. In addition, the nude person is not present.)

== Physical releases ==
The physical releases of Book I, II, and III featured guest strips drawn by other artists, including Kate Leth, Ryan North, Julia Kaye, and Night in the Woods creator Scott Benson. The revenue received from extra copies of Book I was donated to charities and GoFundMe pages benefiting the Black community.

In 2022, Silver Sprocket released a hardcover collection of the entirety of Mr. Boop.

== Reception ==
Mr. Boop was shortlisted for Heidi MacDonald's 2021 Cartoonists Studio Prize, and was nominated for an Ignatz Award. Zachary Jenkins of ComicsXF said "Until the team behind Sonic understands our dark desires, we will have to fulfill our needs with underground art like Mr. Boop." In 2022, Silver Sprocket's hardcover collection of the series won the Ignatz Award for Outstanding Collection.

The Verge called it "a hilarious, sometimes existentially troubling interrogation of what’s fascinating about fandoms and dumb about copyright law" and "a note-perfect satire of a very specific time on the internet".
