= Nemi (comic strip) =

Norwegian comic strip

- Translation: "So you don't think playing "hard to get" will work after this?"
- Author: Lise Myhre
- Website: Norwegian; English
- Current status/schedule: Running
- Launch date: 1997
- Publishers: Titan Books (hardcover collections); several Nordic daily newspapers
- Genre: Humour
- Preceded by: Den svarte siden

Nemi (Norwegian pronunciation: [ˈnêːmi]) is a Norwegian comic strip, written and drawn by Lise Myhre. It made its first appearance in 1997 under the title Den svarte siden ("the Black Side" or "the Black Page"). At that time, it was a tonally dark cartoon concerning heavy metal subcultures. Over the years, Myhre made the comic generally brighter and more comedic, though still frequently published with strips about serious issues, especially in the larger Saturday panels. The strip was renamed Nemi after its protagonist, a young goth woman.

Myhre has also illustrated poems by Edgar Allan Poe and André Bjerke in the strip.

== Publication ==
=== Newspapers ===
In the United Kingdom and Ireland, the strip was, until 8 January 2016, printed daily in the Metro newspaper, after translation into English; background images, and magazines the characters are reading often remain clearly in Norwegian. Originally Nemi was published in monthly extreme music magazine Terrorizer before it lost the UK rights due to the syndication deal with Metro. In Norway, Sweden, Finland and Denmark the strip runs in several local daily newspapers.

=== Comic books and albums ===
The strip has its own monthly comic book in Norway and Sweden, with similar (but not identical) content. The Norwegian comic book has introduced several upcoming Norwegian comic artists, and also run foreign comics including Lenore by Roman Dirge, Em by Maria Smedstad, Liberty Meadows by Frank Cho, WayLay by Carol Lay, EC Comics horror classics, Sinfest by Tatsuya Ishida and Fables by Bill Willingham.

An album series collecting the strips chronologically has been published in Norway, Sweden and Finland. Apart from Norway, books are published in Sweden, Denmark, Finland, Germany, Spain, Italy, France and the United Kingdom.

Books in English:

- Nemi (Titan books, 2007, ISBN 978-1-84576-586-6)
- Nemi II (Titan books, 2008, ISBN 978-1-84576-614-6)
- Nemi III (Titan books, 2009, ISBN 1-84576-615-6 & ISBN 978-1-84576-615-3)
- Nemi IV (Titan books, 2010, ISBN 1-84576-589-3 & ISBN 978-1-84576-589-7)

=== Mobile ===
Nemi is also available on Apple mobile and Android devices.

== Main characters ==
=== Nemi Montoya ===
A goth woman 20 years of age, Nemi almost always wears black clothes (although she does very rarely wear red scarves and gloves, and has a red bath towel), has very pale skin and long black hair, and very little in common with most of the rest of the world. She shares her name with a lake in Italy, Lake Nemi, though this was not known by the author when the character was created, and her surname from Inigo Montoya, a character in Lise Myhre's favourite film, The Princess Bride. It underlines Nemi's "outsider" status within Norwegian society and suggests that she may not be naturally raven-haired. This is confirmed in one cartoon where a childhood friend fails to recognise her without her "blond curls"—implying her hair is not only dyed but also straightened; however, the several comics showing Nemi as a black-haired child with her long hair in bunches also possibly suggest that she may have at least once tried to fit in with normal society. She has a black dragon tattoo on her left shoulder.

==== Character ====
Nemi is a "tough girl" with an attitude, not afraid to speak her mind and more often than not in confrontational ways: blunt rejections of would-be one-night stands at the pub are not uncommon. At the same time, she can be very sensitive: a devoted animal activist, she is against killing anything, including spiders, of which she is very fond. Nemi is nominally vegetarian, though she will occasionally indulge in seafood; her true passion is for chocolate and Coca-Cola, and she finds fault with people who prefer Pepsi over Coke. She can also feel very alone at times. She is afraid of growing up, and loathes blonde bimbos (vide a cartoon in which she insinuates that Tim is nothing more than a replaceable penis for his new blonde-bimbo girlfriend). Her fear of growing up is reflected in her appeal to readers through her childlike qualities and innocence, as well as her sense of fun.

Nemi has great difficulty keeping down a job due to her inability to sleep at a decent hour and wake up in the morning; her most steady form of employment is babysitting for her responsible and grown-up friends. Not surprisingly, childlike Nemi gets along very well with children but her dark sense of humour and grim fairy tales often traumatize them (although, it is more common that the parents are traumatized when hearing what the children have been allowed to read). Occasionally, she works in music stores at the counter but usually is fired pretty quickly after various altercations with customers over the corrupt morals of popular stars. In Nemi III, it's revealed that Nemi grew up fairly poor and was bullied at school; this is where she gets most of her cynical and insecure traits from that would hinder her in adult life. Growing up poor also affected her ability to manage money as an adult, as she would rather spend her money than save it or pay her bills.

==== Lifestyle ====
She listens to heavy metal music, and has a number of friends in those subcultures who dress similarly. She is often unemployed or employed in temporary jobs, where she often gets fired for her temper (such as beating a customer who asked for a CD of Christina Aguilera for her daughter, instead of the Alice Cooper CD Nemi had suggested).

She is fond of holidays in warmer countries, but when at the beach she uses top-grade sunblock cream to avoid tanning, which would severely damage her carefully cultivated surface image. Nemi suffers from strong allergic reactions and has advocated exterminating birch trees, on the grounds that "we kill off thousands of species every day anyway".

She likes to visit the pub, often with her friend Cyan, where she often gets drunk. Alcoholism is however not a main theme of the comic. However, as a consequence Nemi has a lot of casual sex, and often wakes up beside complete strangers. In spring 2011, she became enamoured with a beefcake boyfriend whom she converted to vegetarianism with a single look. Her boyfriend, Grimm, is now a huge part of Nemi's life and the two are regularly featured together in the (UK) strip, sharing and discussing off-beat topics. The strips in which they appear can be said to mirror the strips that only feature Cyan and Leo.

Nemi's room in the apartment is almost always a mess, and she has an uncontrollable passion for chocolate.

==== Politics ====
Nemi does not state a clear political preference, but is opposed to George W. Bush, Norwegian whale hunting and hunting in general, fur, smoking restrictions (although depictions of her smoking have declined dramatically in recent years), the Norwegian agrarian party Senterpartiet and in general the Establishment. The animal rights content is mostly passive resistance (in one cartoon Nemi disrupts a moose hunt by singing loudly to scare the moose away), but other cartoons appear to rather simplistically condone violence against scientists conducting research on animals, e.g. one in which Nemi tries to teach a laboratory mouse how to swing a baseball bat (though this could be seen as very much a child's way of thinking of the subject). In another cartoon Nemi berates a boyfriend for disagreeing with her on this issue, the punchline being that he is apparently not fit to be regarded as a human for doing so. Nemi is also a pescetarian.

==== Culture ====
Nemi's heroes are Edgar Allan Poe, H. P. Lovecraft, André Bjerke, J. R. R. Tolkien, Alice Cooper, W.A.S.P., The Phantom Blot, Darth Vader and Batman. She also has a passion for dragons, and hates reality shows such as Big Brother, with the exception of Extreme Makeover: Home Edition. She regards "modern art" as simply a manifestation of insecurity by would-be intellectuals, who secretly know they have nothing original to say (vide a cartoon in which Nemi visits a modern art exhibition with Cyan and Tim). Nemi has vehement opinions about the arts, especially music, and an enthusiastic willingness to destroy art she deems unworthy, as when she asks a bartender to lend her a CD by The Corrs, presumably to burn herself a copy of it, and then sets it on fire instead. She adores, among others, Dimmu Borgir, Laibach, Opeth, The Cure, Tori Amos, The Sisters of Mercy, Red Harvest, Nicole Blackman, Lamented Souls, Use Me, Warrior Soul, Metallica, Darkthrone, Slayer, and Alice Cooper (as mentioned above). She once met the "Showman" Alice Cooper character from The Last Temptation.

=== Other characters ===
Cyan is Nemi's best friend. She has cyan hair worn in bunches, and a lot of worries (apparently being especially afraid of spiders and death; vide the recurring nightmare cartoon). She usually functions as Nemi's conscience and reality anchor, or the other way around: the two basically take turns playing the Straight man or comic foil for each other. Cyan works a nine-to-five shift in an office in a mid-level but low-paying position and often brings her work home with her; she spends much time planning her future and struggling to be a responsible adult, much to Nemi's disdain. She had a one-night stand in Prague and gave birth to a girl in 2017.

Grimm enters Nemi's life early in 2012 (British strip) and is now Nemi's live-in boyfriend who shares some of her goth ideas but is down-to-earth and sensible, and endeavours to return Nemi to the real world when she strays too far. A fireman, he is a muscular giant of a man compared to Nemi and Cyan (bearing a strong resemblance to Peter Steele), but gentle and non-abusive. He is also instrumental in steering Nemi away from chocolate when he can; however, he does indulge some other fantasies. He comes across in current strips as a caring cohabitant unlikely to stray (Jan 2013).

Ophelia is another friend of Nemi and Cyan. She is an artist, and usually miserable. She is overweight, has long grey hair and wears a long brown dress.

Tim used to be Cyan's boyfriend. A punk-metal fan with a green mohawk, he plays in a mediocre band, and has no permanent job but financially relied on Cyan and lived with her rent-free for quite some time. Tim and Cyan had a pretty bad relationship (e.g. him suggesting their sex life was boring, prompting Cyan to put him in the hospital with a black eye and a broken arm) until eventually he dumped her for a blonde. Subsequently, his presence in the strip was sharply reduced to make way for Leo, Cyan's new boyfriend.

Leo was Cyan's boyfriend, a much more responsible alternative to Tim, and works in advertising. Cyan and Leo formerly live together and have what Cyan refers to as a "grown-up and committed" relationship (which means they own a wide-screen plasma television together). Unfortunately their relationship ended in 2015.

Nemi's Dad is one of the main influences on Nemi's life as it is. He's a goth who hides his face behind a shiny black "Ozzy Osbourne" hairstyle and is partial to Wumpscut and reading comics (much like Nemi). He and Nemi's mother divorced at some point and he later remarried, much to Nemi's disdain. However Nemi's dad and Evilina have long since divorced. Nemi's dad is currently in a same-sex relationship. He often makes Nemi feel like a little girl.

Evilina is Nemi's dad's second ex-wife, a stereotypical stepmother from hell with a very snobby attitude, plenty of money, and a standard for hygiene and cleanliness. Evilina wears fur (which Nemi objects to) and speaks in a loathing icy tone most of the time; she seems to enjoy pointing out the flaws in Nemi's life and leaves the usually outspoken Nemi too insecure to speak back.

The cartoon also features a large number of friends, family, short-term boyfriends, and Goths.

== Nemi in the United States ==
The Nemi books are available for sale in the United States, one of which has the foreword by Tori Amos.

In episode 3 of the US TV series Defying Gravity, the character of Steve Wassenfelder is seen having a Nemi cover hanging on his wall.

== Soundtrack ==
Nemi Soundtrack

Soundtrack album
- Released: 5 March 2001
- Recorded: 2001
- Genres: Electronic, rock
- Length: 57:38
- Label: Nocturnal Art Productions

A soundtrack was released by Nocturnal Art Productions in 2001 and a screensaver was included on the soundtrack.

Track listing

No.	Title	Length
1.	"Fields of the Nephilim - One More Nightmare"	5:12
2.	"Zection 8 - On and On"	4:39
3.	"Warrior Soul - The Losers"	6:43
4.	"Hagalaz' Runedance - On Wings of Rapture (Vision of Skuld Re-Mix)"	4:04
5.	"Lamented Souls - Var"	6:31
6.	"Bay Laurel - Pale Colours"	3:53
7.	"Beyond Dawn - Atmosphere (Version)"	5:31
8.	"Mayhem - A Bloodsword and a Colder Sun"	5:00
9.	"Zeromancer - Houses of Cards"	3:57
10.	"Magicka - Lullaby for a Vampire"	3:50
11.	"Living Dreamtime - Silver Streams"	5:10
12.	"Red Harvest - Absolut Dunkel:Heit"	3:39
