= Ozy and Millie =

Daily comic strip

- Cover of the 2018 collection
- Author: Dana Simpson
- Website: OzyAndMillie.org
- Current status/schedule: Ended
- Launch date: April 29, 1998
- End date: December 23, 2008
- Publisher(s): Plan Nine Publishing; Universal Uclick
- Genre: Satire/Comedy

Ozy and Millie is a webcomic that ran from 1998 to 2008, created by Dana Simpson (originally published under D.C. Simpson). It follows the adventures of assorted anthropomorphic animals, centering on Ozy and Millie, two young foxes attending North Harbordale Elementary School in Seattle, Washington, contending with everyday elementary school issues such as tests and bullies, as well as more surreal situations.

The strip mostly concentrates on character interaction, but sometimes veers into commentary based on author Simpson's own political views.

== Publication history ==
Ozy and Millie originally started as a printed comic strip in a Washington college newspaper, the Copper Point Journal, in 1997, with Simpson using ink and brush as drawing implements. Simpson claims to have been influenced by various comics and cartoons such as Bloom County, Calvin and Hobbes, The Simpsons, and Pogo.

It became an irregular webcomic in early 1998. In June that same year, it was changed to a Monday-Friday daily strip. The comic led Simpson to win the Scripps-Howard Foundation Charles M. Schulz College Cartoonist award and a College Media Advisors: Best Strip Cartoon award.

The strip has gone on hiatus several times. In 2000, the strip went on hiatus and returned with a new, unique style. Between January 30, 2004, and January 12, 2009, Simpson also ran another strip, I Drew This, a webcomic specifically about her political views (which are also slightly expressed in Ozy and Millie).

The comic was part of Keenspot from 2001 to 2003, going independent for several years before returning to Keenspot in November 2006. New strips were released on most weekdays, though the strip's run ended in December of 2008. Since then, it has been re-run intermittently on GoComics.

Editorial cartoonist Ted Rall included six pages of interview illustrated with Ozy and Millie strips in Attitude 3: The New Subversive Online Cartoonists.

== Collected editions ==
Most of the strips have been reprinted in book form. They are published as follows:

- An incomplete five volume collection from Plan Nine Publishing, now out of print.
- A complete seven volume collection from Lulu.com, in paperback, that replaces the discontinued Plan Nine collection. It covers the entire run of the strip from 1997 to 2008.
- A complete two volume collection from Lulu.com, in paperback and hardcover: an alternative to the seven volume collection that also covers the entire run of the strip.
- A two-book best-of collection from Andrews McMeel Publishing, in paperback and hardcover, with each strip in full color for the first time.

Collection	Name	ISBN	Pages
Out of print
Out of print	Ozy and Millie	ISBN 1929462115	
Out of print	Ozy and Millie II: Never Mind Pants	ISBN 1929462204	
Out of print	Ozy and Millie III: Ink and White Space	ISBN 1929462433	
Out of print	Ozy and Millie IV: Authentic Banana Dye	ISBN 1929462565	
Out of print	Ozy and Millie V: Om	ISBN 1929462697‡	
Seven volume collection
Seven volume collection	Prehistrionics: Ozy and Millie, 1997–2000	ISBN 1847287735	176
Seven volume collection	The Big Book of Ancient, Semi-Coherent Wisdom: Ozy and Millie, 2000–2001	ISBN 9781430315056	132
Seven volume collection	Zen Again: Ozy and Millie, 2001–2002	ISBN 9781430315087	128
Seven volume collection	Perpetual Motion: Ozy and Millie, 2002–2003	ISBN 9781430321163	128
Seven volume collection	Tofu Knights: Ozy and Millie, 2004–2005	ISBN 1847287727	128
Seven volume collection	Closer to the Void: Ozy and Millie, 2006–2007	ISBN 9781435705043	127
Seven volume collection	Never Grow Up: One More Ozy and Millie Collection	N/A	127
Two volume collection	The Complete Ozy and Millie, Volume 1	N/A	337
Two volume collection	The Complete Ozy and Millie, Volume 2	N/A	336
Best of collection	Ozy and Millie	Hardcover ISBN 9781449499433; Paperback ISBN 9781449495954	178; 176
Best of collection	Ozy and Millie: Perfectly Normal	Paperback ISBN 9781524865092	177

‡ Volume 5 of the original printing by Plan Nine Publishing shares an ISBN with Orange Alert by John Robey, a webcomic printed by the same publisher.

== Characters ==
=== Ozy ===
Ozymandias Justin Llewellyn is a ten-year-old anthropomorphic fox of an unidentified species (also called an "Adolescent Gray Zen Fox") who attends North Harbordale Elementary School in Seattle with his friend, Millie. His full name, Ozymandias Justin Llewellyn, is a reference to the famous poem Ozymandias by Percy Bysshe Shelley.

Ozy is recognised by his large top hat, which he got from his adoptive father, Llewellyn. The only other clothing he wears is a vest, which makes him the target of some of Millie's practical jokes. He is adept at letting Millie's pranks pass by without effect, but he does suffer bullying at the hands of the school jock, Jeremy, who likes to stuff Ozy into trash cans. Ozy is also quiescent and serene, usually playing the "straight person". Under Llewellyn's guidance, Ozy also practices Zen (or rather, a humorous version of it).

=== Millie ===
Millicent Mehitabel Mudd, better known as Millie, is a ten-year-old red fox girl who is best friends with Ozy. Millie is usually seen wearing a set of blue denim overalls. Unlike Ozy, who is calm, Millie is chaotic and crafty, both in the destruction she leaves behind and the ways she devises of avoiding work (or attempting to). She is a rebel and is opposed to any form of authority, which regularly leads to confrontations with both her teacher, Ms. Sorkowitz, and her mother, Mililani Mudd. Although she is normally manic, she also has a strong sense of justice, facing the inexplicable wrongs of life and the world she sees. However, her rebellions are mostly limited to annoying her mother, playing jokes on Ozy and disrupting the peace at school; none of which matters any less to her, as long as she has fun doing it. She, like Ozy, often tries to answer the most important questions in life, but her method of finding the answers makes her unique.

=== Llewellyn ===
Ozy's adoptive father, known only as Llewellyn, is a red dragon. Llewellyn and other members of his dragon family have been responsible for running several secret conspiracies. He also lends both Ozy and Millie advice, although his advice can tend to be nonsense. The words in his speech balloons are always in the Blackletter font, unlike most of the characters. Llewellyn married Millie's Mother at the end of the Daily Strip. Of all the characters in Ozy and Millie, Simpson has claimed that Llewellyn is her favorite.

=== Ms. Mudd ===
Ms. Mililani Minerva Mudd, Millie's mother, is a lawyer, who is an older, wiser, more temperate version of Millie. She was like Millie in her childhood, and as a result knows how to deal with any trouble caused by her, much to Millie's annoyance. While Ms. Mudd knows how to deal with Millie, she is also the first to lend her support if there is anything amiss. She married Llewellyn at the end of the strip's run in a story arc from November–December 2008. Her full name was revealed on October 1, 2008.

=== Other characters ===
Other characters in Ozy and Millie include Avery, a raccoon friend who constantly tries to be "cool," even ditching his "uncool" friends on frequent occasions. Ironically, his friend, Stephan the aardvark, is rather the nerdiest character in the strip. Avery's curious younger brother, Timulty, constantly undermines his coolness, although he simply likes being with him and his friends. The two major antagonists are Felicia the sheep, a "popular girl" who teases Millie for being too individualistic, and Jeremy the jock rabbit who bullies Ozy for few reasons.

Other minor characters include Ms. Sorkowitz, Ozy and Millie's kangaroo teacher, and Principal Beau Vine, the bull principal of the school who allows bullying, believing that "Repeated exposure to unprovoked assault squelches unhealthy nonconformist tendencies." Dr. I. Wahnsinnig (the German word for insane or mad) is a ring-tailed lemur and psychiatrist of the school who fights with Vine over school issues and frequently interacts with Millie. Ozy's dragon cousin, Isolde, is known for her unusual methods in her job in journalism, and, like Llewellyn, is in charge of various conspiracies. Another character is Pirate Captain Locke, a child pirate from an alternate dimension on the other side of Llewellyn's couch, in which people age backwards. Locke, currently the same age as Millie, is also her biological father.

== Reception ==
Critic Fred Patten is one of the main supporters of the strip. In 2001, he wrote that the strip was, "a gently humorous fantasy with a liberal political philosophy." In 2006, Patten still claimed that, "Ozy and Millie is one of the top anthropomorphic cartoon strips on the Internet," although he did also comment negatively about the loss of colour in between changes of printed editions of books. The comic is also popular because of its relatively inoffensive content, with one person writing that it was, "Suitable for readers of all ages, really." The strip (the books, specifically) has also received decent reviews from outside sources and other critics.

In 2002, the strip won the Web Cartoonists' Choice Awards for "Best Anthropomorphic Comic". Ozy and Millie also won the 2006 and 2007 Ursa Major Awards for "Best Anthropomorphic Comic Strip". In 2009 (the year after she ended the strip), she won that year's Comic Strip Superstar contest.

== See also ==
- Phoebe and Her Unicorn (aka Heavenly Nostrils)
