= 100 Days Until You Die =

Japanese manga series

- Cover of manga volume 1 with character Umi Kanzaki

君が死ぬまであと100日 (Kimi ga Shinu Made Ato Hyaku Nichi)
- Genre: Romantic comedy
- Manga
- Written by: Migihara
- Published by: Shueisha
- English publisher: Shueisha (digital)
- Imprint: Margaret Comics
- Magazine: Manga Mee; Shonen Jump+
- Original run: November 1, 2018 – October 1, 2020
- Volumes: 6
- Television drama
- Original network: Nippon TV
- Original run: October 24, 2023 – December 26, 2023
- Episodes: 10

100 Days Until You Die (君が死ぬまであと100日, Kimi ga Shinu Made Ato Hyaku Nichi) is a Japanese web manga series written and illustrated by Migihara. It was serialized on Shueisha's online platform Manga Mee from November 2018 (and on Shōnen Jump+ from January 2020) to October 2020. The story follows Rintarou Tsuda, a high school student with the ability to see longevity, and Umi Kanzaki, a high school girl with less than 100 days left to live. Migihara described the series as "a story about the battle against longevity and fate". A television drama adaptation aired from October to December 2023.

== Plot ==
Rintarou Tsuda is a high school student with the capacity to predict the lifespan of living things. However, he has struggled with his abilities since he was a child, and he can only gradually observe the people around him without being able to assist them. He discovers one day that Umi Kanzaki, his childhood buddy and the one who has feelings for him, has less than 100 days to live.

During the concept stage, Umi Kanzaki was supposed to die after 100 days, and the entire tale would be about "how to live in 100 days", but due to the gloom, the story was adjusted to be more comical romantic while keeping the original core theme.

== Characters ==
Rintarō Tsuda (津田林太郎, Tsuda Rintarō)
Portrayed by: Yuto Takahashi
Rintarō Tsuda is a very emotional boy. His name is derived from the fact that the author has a friend with the nickname "Tarō".
Umi Kanzaki (神崎うみ, Kanzaki Umi)
Tarō's childhood friend. Tarō confesses his affections to Umi in the first chapter of the series, and she accepts him, but Tarō quickly finds that Umi only has roughly 100 days left to live. Despite her feminine appearance, Umi is a neutral figure who pays little attention to others.
Itsuki Onodera
Portrayed by: Mizuki Inoue

== Media ==
=== Manga ===
Written and illustrated by Migihara, 100 Days Until You Die started in Shueisha's online platform Manga Mee on November 1, 2018; it also started publishing on Shōnen Jump+ on January 23, 2020. The series finished on October 1, 2020. Shueisha collected its chapters in six tankōbon volumes, released from November 25, 2019, to November 25, 2020. Shueisha began publishing the manga in English on its Manga Million digital platform in 2026.

==== Volume list ====
No.	Japanese release date	Japanese ISBN
1	November 25, 2019	978-4-08-844270-9
2	January 24, 2020	978-4-08-844307-2
3	March 25, 2020	978-4-08-844322-5
4	May 25, 2020	978-4-08-844342-3
5	November 25, 2020	978-4-08-844366-9
6	November 25, 2020	978-4-08-844401-7

=== Drama ===
A television drama adaptation was announced on September 18, 2023. The series stars Yuto Takahashi and Mizuki Inoue, both of HiHiJets, as Rintarō Tsuda and Itsuki Onodera respectively. It aired on Nippon TV from October 24 to December 26, 2023.
