= Crossplay Love: Otaku x Punk =

Japanese manga series

- Japanese volume 1 cover, depicting Shuumei (left) and Yuuma (right) as themselves and as their female alter egos Mei and Hana

女装してめんどくさい事になってるネクラとヤンキーの両片想い (Josou-shite Mendokusai Koto ni Natteru Nekura to Yankii no Ryou Kataomoi)
- Genre: Romantic comedy
- Manga
- Written by: Toru
- Published by: Mag Garden
- English publisher: NA: Seven Seas Entertainment
- Imprint: Blade Comics
- Magazine: MAGXIV
- Original run: April 18, 2018 – present
- Volumes: 15
- Manga

Kesanani & Nekuyan Collab!
- Written by: Toru, Yuu Horii
- Published by: Mag Garden
- Published: November 5, 2019

Crossplay Love: Otaku x Punk, known in Japan as Josou-shite Mendokusai Koto ni Natteru Nekura to Yankee no Ryou Kataomoi (Note: Josou-shite Mendokusai Koto ni Natteru Nekura to Yankee no Ryou Kataomoi (Japanese: 女装してめんどくさい事になってるネクラとヤンキーの両片想い; "Dressing Up Like Women Became Troublesome: A Pessimist and a Delinquent's Mutual Unrequited Love")) and abbreviated Nekuyan, (Note: Nekuyan (ネクヤン)) is a Japanese romantic comedy manga series written and drawn by Toru, originally released independently since April 18, 2018, and published by Mag Garden on MAGXIV since September 10, 2018. The series is also published in collected tankōbon volumes, which are released in English by Seven Seas Entertainment since September 2022.

The story follows Yuuma Hanae and Shuumei Satogiri, two young men who fall in love with each other while cross-dressing, both believing the other to be a woman. Following this, both try to keep the other from learning the truth. The series was well received by readers and critics for its comedic and suspenseful writing, and was nominated for the 2019 Next Manga Award and the 2020 Denshi Comic Awards.

== Premise ==
Yuuma Hanae, (Note: Yuuma Hanae (波苗 憂真, Hanae Yuuma)) a gloomy student, works at the Taishō era-themed maid café Roman as a waitress, where he as part of his job cross-dresses in a kimono-inspired dress and goes by the feminine name Hana. (Note: Hana (花)) Shuumei Satogiri, (Note: Shuumei Satogiri (里切 秀明, Satogiri Shuumei)) a delinquent at the same school, mistakes Yuuma for a woman and falls in love with him, but is afraid of approaching him, so he disguises himself as a woman, and becomes a regular at Roman as his female alter ego Mei. (Note: Mei (めい))

Yuuma does not realize that Shuumei is a man, and falls in love with him, too – but since Yuuma dislikes delinquents and Shuumei dislikes gloomy people, both must keep the other from learning the truth of who they are. Other characters include Shuumei's childhood friend Yuzuru Tanigami, (Note: Yuzuru Tanigami (谷上 弓弦, Tanigami Yuzuru)) who sees through Yuuma's and Shuumei's disguises but pretends not to.

== Production and release ==
The series is created by Toru, who writes the story with a combination of misunderstanding-based comedy, romance, and suspense. It was originally released independently through their Twitter account starting on April 18, 2018; since September 10, 2018, it is serialized by Mag Garden on their digital platform MAGXIV. In May 2025, after the release of chapters 114 and 115, Toru and their editor put the manga on hiatus to restart the story from chapter 114 and redo these chapters; Toru mentioned having agonized over the decision, saying they believed this should "never be done" after a chapter has already been published. They cited having been under "a great mental strain" for the past few years, impacting their ability to write, which had resulted in them drawing chapter 114 and 115 without fully developing the narrative, and putting it in a "dead end" they felt they could not continue writing from. As the manga was entering its final arc, they were also concerned about being able to deliver something of the quality they wanted without starting over. The serialization continued with a new chapter 114 the next month.

Mag Garden has published collected tankōbon volumes of the series in Japanese since February 9, 2019, under its imprint Blade Comics and has released 14 volumes as of February 9, 2026. On November 5, 2019, Toru and Kesaran Nanigashi to Soup'ya-san creator Yuu Horii released a cross-over one-shot manga based on their respective series, Kesanani & Nekuyan Collab!. (Note: Kesanani & Nekuyan Collab! (「ケサなに」&「ネクヤン」コラボ！, Kesanani to Nekuyan Korabo!)) Mag Garden has also released Crossplay Love merchandise including art prints and badges.

The tankōbon volumes have since been translated into other languages: Kazé began publishing the series in German in April 2022, Dango Manga in Thai beginning in June 2022, and Seven Seas Entertainment in English in September 2022. Piccoma has published the series in French since September 2022 as a digital-only release.

=== Volumes ===
No.	Original release date	Original ISBN	English release date	English ISBN
1	February 9, 2019	978-4800008299	September 27, 2022	978-1638585848
1. "Hana and Mei" (花とめい, Hana to Mei); 2. "Yuuma and Shuumei" (憂真とシューメー, Yuuma to Shuumei); 3. "Otaku and Punk" (ネクラとヤンキー, Nekura to Yankee); 4. "The Pair and the Windy Day" (二人と風の日, Futari to Kaze no Hi); 5. "Mei and Yuuma" (めいと憂真, Mei to Yuuma); 6. "Hana and Shuumei" (花とシューメー, Hana to Shuumei); 7. "Mei and Her Reward" (めいとごほうび, Mei to Gohoubi); 8. "Yuzuru and Shuumei" (ゆづるとシューメー, Yuzuru to Shuumei); 9. "Shuumei and Kanoko" (シューメーとかのこ, Shuumei to Kanoko); "Extra: Yuuma and Udon-san" (番外編 憂真とうどんさん, Bangai-hen: Yuuma to Udon-san) (part 1–2); "Bonus #1: First Contact" (描き下ろし① ファーストコンタクト, Kakioroshi 1: Fāsuto Kontakuto); "Bonus #2: Roman and Nurses" (描き下ろし② 浪漫とナース, Kakioroshi 2: Roman to Nāsu)
2	July 10, 2019	978-4800008756	November 22, 2022	978-1638589570
10. "Mei and Kanoko" (めいとかのこ, Mei to Kanoko); 11. "Mei and the Confession" (めいと告白, Mei to Kokuhaku); 12. "Yuuma and the Undesirables" (憂真と不良, Yuuma to Furyou); 13. "Mei and Scars" (めいとキズあと, Mei to Kizuato); 14. "My Type and Your Type" (二人とタイプ, Futari to Type); 15. "Punk and Otaku" (ヤンキーとオタク, Yankee to Otaku); 16. "Yuuma and Tsubaki" (憂真とつばき, Yuuma to Tsubaki); 17. "Mei and Yuzuru" (めいとゆづる, Mei to Yuzuru); 18. "Distance and Gap" (距離と隔たり, Kyori to Hedatari); 19. "Popularity and Nakamura-shi" (モテと中村氏, Mote to Nakamura-shi); "Bonus #1: Yuuma and the Beginning" (描き下ろし① 憂真とハジメテ, Kakioroshi 1: Yuuma to Hajimete); "Bonus #2: Roman and Police" (描き下ろし② 浪漫とポリス, Kakioroshi 2: Roman to Police); "Bonus #3: Udon and his Merry Men" (描き下ろし③ うどんと愉快な仲間たち, Kakioroshi 3: Udon to Yukai na Nakama-tachi)
3	December 10, 2019	978-4800009203	February 21, 2023	978-1638589747
20. "Tsubaki and Suspicion" (つばきと疑念, Tsubaki to Ginen); 21. "Yuuma and Belief" (憂真と確信, Yuuma to Kakushin); 22. "Punk and Horror" (ヤンキーとホラー, Yankee to Horror); 23. "Otaku and Terror" (ネクラとテラー, Nekura to Terror); 24. "Hana and Salvation" (花と人助け, Hana to Hitodasuke); 25. "Shuumei and the Present" (シューメーとプレゼント, Shuumei to Present); 26. "Everyone and Their Day-to-Day" (みんなと日常, Minna to Nichijou); 27. "Absence and Yuuma" (会えない時間と憂真, Aenai Jikan to Yuuma); 28. "Cuteness and Mei" (かわいいとめい, Kawaii to Mei); 29. "Yuzuru and the Truth" (ゆづると真意, Yuzuru to Shin'i); "Bonus #1: Roman and Switch" (描き下ろし① 浪漫と変身, Kakioroshi 1: Roman to Henshin); "Bonus #2: Coincidence and Him" (描き下ろし② 偶然とあの人, Kakioroshi 2: Guuzen to Ano Hito)
4	May 9, 2020	978-4800009708	May 2, 2023	978-1685795122
30. "Hana and Nakamura-kun" (花と中村氏, Hana to Nakamura-shi); 31. "Mei and the Couple Quandary" (めいとカップル, Mei to Couple); 32. "Mei and the Favor" (めいと手伝い, Mei to Tetsudai); 33. "Mei and Nakamura-kun" (めいと中村氏, Mei to Nakamura-shi); 34. "Shuumei and the Fever" (シューメーと発熱, Shuumei to Hatsunetsu); 35. "Hana and 38.7°C" (花と38.7度, Hana to 38.7 Do); 36. "Yuuma and Soumei" (憂真と蒼明, Yuuma to Soumei); 37. "Hana and Modeling" (花とモデル, Hana to Model); 38. "Hana and Yuzuru" (花とゆづる, Hana to Yuzuru); 39. "Yuzuru and Nakamura-kun" (ゆづると中村氏, Yuzuru to Nakamura-shi); "Bonus #1: Jun and Those Three" (描き下ろし① 潤とあの3人, Kakioroshi 1: Jun to Ano Sannin); "Bonus #2: Reina and Those Two" (描き下ろし② レイナとあの2人, Kakioroshi 2: Reina to Ano Futari); "Bonus #3: Pasta and Ramen" (描き下ろし③ パスタとラーメン, Kakioroshi 3: Pasta to Ramen)
5	October 10, 2020	978-4800010209	August 1, 2023	978-1685799120
40. "Tanigami Yuzuru and Nakamura Jun" (谷上弓弦と中村潤, Tanigami Yuzuru to Nakamura Jun); 41. "Jun and Shuumei" (潤とシューメー, Jun to Shuumei); 42. "The Secret and a Request" (隠し事とお願い, Kakushigoto to Onegai); 43. "A Date and an Accident" (デートとアクシデント, Date to Accident); 44. "Hesitation and Choice" (ためらいと選択, Tamerai to Sentaku); 45. "Impatience and Determination" (焦りと決断, Aseri to Ketsudan); 46. "Yuzuru and Mei" (弓弦とめい, Yuzuru to Mei); 47. "Dislikes and Human Nature" (苦手と人それぞれ, Nigate to Hito Sorezore); 47.5. "Meanwhile" (花たちと一方そのころ, Hana-tachi to Ippou Sonokoro); 48. "Yuuma and the Invitation" (憂真とご招待, Yuuma to Goshoutai); "Bonus #1: Mei and Pride" (描き下ろし① めいとプライド, Kakioroshi 1: Mei to Pride); "Bonus #2: Shimazaki and Makeup" (描き下ろし② 嶋崎とメイク, Kakioroshi 2: Shimazaki to Meiku); "Bonus #3: Kanoko and the Supernatural" (描き下ろし③ 霊感と子, Kakioroshi 3: Reikan to Ko); "Bonus #4: Soba and the Request, Part 1" (描き下ろし④ そばと依頼 前編, Kakioroshi 4: Soba to Irai Zenpen)
6	April 9, 2021	978-4800010704	October 31, 2023	979-8888430330
49. "Yuuma and the Satogiris" (憂真と里切家, Yuuma to Satogiri Ie); 50. "Yuuma and Sayu" (憂真とさゆ, Yuuma to Sayu); 51. "Eyeballing and One Punch" (ガン見と一発, Ganmi to Ippai); 52. "Hana and Hanayama" ("花と花山", Hana to Hanayama); 53. "Hana and the Lost Item" (花と落とし物, Hana to Otoshimono); 54. "Shuumei and the Fallen Object" (シューメーと落下物, Shuumei to Rakkabutsu); 55. "Mei and Distress" (めいと気がかり, Mei to Kigakari); 56. "Nakamura-kun and Worry" (中村氏と心配, Nakamura-shi to Shinpai); 57. "Distance and Warmth" (距離感と温度感, Kyorikan to Ondokan); 58. "Hanayama and the One He Wants" (花山と憧れの人, Hanayama to Akogare no Hito); "Bonus #1: Hana and Thunder" (描き下ろし① 花と雷, Kakioroshi 1: Hana to Kaminari); "Bonus #2: Shimazaki and the Trail He Blazed" (描き下ろし② 嶋崎と新開拓, Kakioroshi 2: Shimazaki to Shinkaitaku); "Bonus #3: Soba and the Request, Part 2" (描き下ろし③ そばと依頼 後編, Kakioroshi 3: Soba to Irai Kouhen)
7	September 10, 2021	978-4800011305	January 9, 2024	979-8888431023
59. "Mei and the Last Resort" (めいと苦肉の策, Mei to Kuniku no Saku); 60. "Yuuma and Boyfriending" (憂真と彼氏役, Yuuma to Kareshi-yaku); 61. "Love and Timidity" (愛しさとめめしさ, Itoshisa to Memeshisa); 62. "Makeup and Summer" (メイクと夏, Meiku to Natsu); 63. "Maids and Jealousy" (メイドとジェラシー, Maid to Jealousy); 64. "Spite and Turmoil" (あてつけと動揺, Atetsuke to Douyou); 65. "Hiyoko and Mei" (緋代子とめい, Hiyoko to Mei); 66. "Mei and Soumei" (めいと蒼明, Mei to Soumei); 67. "Hana and the Hostage" (花と人質, Hana to Hitojichi); 68. "Hana and Shizuku" (花としずく, Hana to Shizuku); "Bonus #1: Sayu and Her Taste in Men" (描き下ろし① さゆと好みの男の子, Kakioroshi 1: Sayu to Konomi no Otoko no Ko); "Bonus #2: Dense and Oblivious" (描き下ろし② 無自覚と鈍感, Kakioroshi 2: Mujikaku to Donkan); "Bonus #3: Aoi and Insider Information" (描き下ろし③ 葵と裏事情, Kakioroshi 3: Aoi to Urajijou); "Bonus #4: Yuzuru and Tsubaki" (描き下ろし④ 弓弦と椿, Kakioroshi 4: Yuzuru to Tsubaki)
8	February 9, 2022	978-4800011749	April 9, 2024	979-8888433461
69. "Hana and Being Forward (花と積極的, Hana to Sekkyoku-teki); 70. "Shizuku and the Secret" (しずくと隠し事, Shizuku to Kakushigoto); 71. "Summer and Anticipation" (夏と期待, Natsu to Kitai); 72. "The Festival and the Yukata Date" (夏祭りと浴衣デート, Natsumatsuri to Yukata Date); 73. "The Festival and the Attack" (夏祭りと襲撃, Natsumatsuri to Shuugeki); 74. "The Festival and the Lost Boy" (夏祭りと迷子, Natsumatsuri to Maigo); 75. "Worry and Premonition" (心配と予感, Shinpai to Yokan); 76. "Shizuku and the Talk" (しずくと相談, Shizuku to Soudan); 77. "Trauma and Misunderstanding" (トラウマと誤解, Trauma to Gokai); 78. "Yuuma and Abduction" (憂真と誘拐, Yuuma to Yuukai); "Bonus #1: Post-Sayu and Her Taste in Men" (描き下ろし① さゆと好みの男の子 after, Kakioroshi 1: Sayu to Konomi no Otoko no Ko After); "Bonus #2: The Komachian Candidate" (描き下ろし② コマチと候補者, Kakioroshi 2: Komachi to Kouhosha)
9	July 8, 2022	978-4800012302	August 6, 2024	979-8891600393
79. "Kidnapping and Shuumei" (誘拐とシューメー, Yuukai to Shuumei); 80. "Misunderstanding and the Truth" (誤解と本当, Gokai to Hontou); 81. "A Break and an Encounter" (休止と遭遇, Kyuushi to Souguu); 82. "Clues and Rumor" (手がかりと言伝, Tegakari to Kotozute); 83. "Reunion and the Unvarnished Truth" (再会と本音, Saikai to Honne); 84. "Confession and the Future" (告白とこれから, Kokuhaku to Korekara); 85. "Cross-dressing and the School Festival" (女装と文化祭, Josou to Bunkasai); 86. "Helpers and Opportunity" (助っ人とチャンス, Suketto to Chance); 87. "Prep Meeting and His Son" (打ち合わせと息子, Uchiawase to Musuko); 88. "Supika and Crossplay" (スピカと女装, Supika to Josou); "Bonus #1: Brothers and Regret" (描き下ろし① 兄弟と残念, Kakioroshi 1: Kyoudai to Zannen); "Bonus #2: The Komachian Candidate and Introductions" (描き下ろし② 候補者と紹介, Kakioroshi 2: Kouhosha to Shoukai)
10	February 9, 2023	978-4800012982	November 12, 2024	979-8891600409
89. "Looks and a Sneaking Suspicion" (面影と疑念, Omokage to Ginen); 90. "Hypothesis and Confirmation" (仮定と確定, Katei to Kakutei); 91. "Bargaining and Cooperation" (駆け引きと協力, Kakehiki to Kyouryoku); 92. "Shizuku and Conflict" (しずくと葛藤, Shizuku to Kattou); 93. "Hana and Her Brother" (花とお兄ちゃん, Hana to Oniichan); 94. "Yuuma and Crossplay" (真と女装, Yuuma to Josou); 95. "Shizuku and Her Friends" (しずくと友人たち, Shizuku to Yuujin-tachi); "Bonus #1: Soumei and the Request" (描き下ろし① お願いと蒼明, Kakioroshi 1: Onegai to Soumei); "Bonus #2: The Komachian Candidate and Introductions 2" (描き下ろし② 候補者と紹介2, Kakioroshi 2: Kouhosha to Shoukai 2)
11	September 7, 2023	978-4800013699	February 11, 2025	979-8891607453
96. "The Search and the Roof" (人捜しと屋上, Hitosagashi to Okujou); 97. "Nakamura-shi and the Truth" (中村氏と真実, Nakamura-shi to Shinjitsu); 98. "Bare-faced and Responsible" (素顔と責任, Sugao to Sekinin); 99. "Father and Son" (父と息子, Chichi to Musuko); 100. "Parent, Child, and Promise" (親子と約束, Oyako to Yakusoku); "Bonus: The Downpour and the Couple (描き下ろし 豪雨ととある夫婦, Kakioroshi: Gouu to Toaru Fuufu)
12	February 8, 2024	978-4800014214	June 3, 2025	979-8891609747
101. "First Love and Café au Lait" (初恋とカフェオレ, Hatsukoi to Café au Lait); 102. "Puzzles and the Fog" (謎解きと洋館, Nazotoki to Youkan); 103. "Ayane and Tsutsuji" (アヤネとつつじ, Ayane to Tsutsuji); 104. "Hobbies Versus Life" (趣味と人生, Shumi to Jinsei); 105. "Falling Seven Times, Getting Up Eight" (七転びと八起き, Nanakorobi to Yaoki); "Bonus: The Komachian Candidate and Introductions Part 3" (描き下ろし 候補者と紹介3, Kakioroshi: Kouhosha to Shoukai 3)
13	September 10, 2024	978-4800014979	October 7, 2025	979-8893738018
106. "Ikidomari to Korekara" (行き止まりとこれから; "Dead End and From Now On"); 107. "Kyoufushin to Koukishin" (恐怖心と好奇心; "Fear and Curiosity"); 108. "Yankee to Sagadachi" (ヤンキーと逆立ち; "Delinquent and Handstand"); 109. "Kizu to Kaori" (傷と香り; "Injury and Smell"); "Bangai-hen: Bunkasai to Hitomaku" (番外編 文化祭と一幕; "Extra: Culture Festival and One Scene); "Kakioroshi: Touchaku to Junbi (描き下ろし 到着と準備; "Bonus: Arrival and Preparations")
14	May 10, 2025	978-4800015969	March 17, 2026	979-8895616925
110. "Te to Te" (手と手; "Hand and Hand"); 111. "Honki to Uso" (本気と嘘; "Truth and Lie"); 112. "Itsuwari to Makoto" (イツワリとまこと; "Lie and Truth"); 113. "Ibasho to Kesshin" (居場所と決心; "Place and Determination"); "Bangai-hen: Kamibukuro to Nakami" (番外編 紙袋と中身; "Extra: A Paper Bag and Its Contents"); "Bangai-hen: Mei to Maria" (番外編 めいとまりあ; "Extra: Mei and Maria"); "Bangai-hen: Satogiri Ie to Kyakujin" (番外編 里切家と客人; "Extra: The Satogiris and the Visitor"); "Kakioroshi: Ohatsu to Satsuei" (描き下ろし お初と撮影; "Bonus: A First Time and a Photo Shoot")
15	February 9, 2026	978-4800017031		

=== Chapters not in collected volumes ===
The following have not been published in collected volumes as of the release of volume 14:

- "Shuumei to Shiranai Hanae" (シューメーと知らない波苗; "Shuumei and the Unfamiliar Hanae"), the original chapter 114
- "Mei to Sankaku Kankei" (めいと三角関係; "Mei and the Love Triangle"), the original chapter 115
- "Bangai-hen: Yankee to Kakureta Skill" (番外編 ヤンキーと隠れたスキル; "Extra: Delinquent and a Hidden Skill")
- 114. "Yuuma to Atarashii Tomodachi" (憂真と新しい友達; "Yuuma and a New Friend")
- 115. "Hana to Kaede" (花と楓; "Hana and Kaede")
- 116. "Kaede to Mei" (楓とめい; "Kaede and Mei")
- 117. "Madoi to ' '" (惑いと「」; "Confusion and ' '")
- 118. "Kamidanomi to Puchi Tatari" (神頼みとプチ祟り; "Praying to God, and Minor Curses")

== Reception ==
Crossplay Love was nominated for the 2019 Next Manga Award and the 2020 Denshi Comic Awards, the latter of which called it a great series with an intriguing premise. The manga's web edition had been viewed 15 million times as of February 2019, and was popular with readers; the American comic book store Sour Cherry Comics reported that it was their second-highest selling queer manga of 2023, after Asuka Miyazaki's X-Gender, and one of their highest selling comics of the year in general. Animania and Splashcomics both considered it a good cross-dressing comedy for fans of the genre, recommending it to readers who have enjoyed similar manga like Mikiyo Tsuda's Princess Princess. Crunchyroll News recommended it to readers who like "fluffy" romantic comedies, and included it in a feature on "fantastic" LGBTQ manga.

The writing was generally well received, with Animania, Koneko, and Splashcomics commending it for its comedic and "mind-boggling set-up" and quirky scenarios, and NLab finding it cute. Koneko appreciated the comedy of the hidden boys' love scenario; Animania also highlighted the comedic moments, which they thought would appeal to cross-dressing and gender-bending fans, but found the timing off for the slapstick-based gags. Reviewing the first volume, they also criticized the series for not living up to the premise's potential to the same level as similar series like Wakana Yanai's Cinderella Closet, although Splashcomics found the story to develop well as it continued, with increasing amounts of chaotic and wacky comedy and suspense as more characters get involved and the two leads try to avoid getting found out. NLab, too, enjoyed the suspenseful developments, such as when the leads meet while only one is disguised as their female alter ego. Multiversity Comics liked its "multi-layered" exploration of sexuality and gender, which they considered earnest while avoiding becoming too serious.

Critics also liked Toru's art, with Splashcomics calling it well staged, and Animania describing it as having a stylish, appealing and frantic shōjo-like style, although at times visually cluttered. They also liked the character designs, which they thought suited each character well, such as Yuuma's "gorgeous" dresses and Shuumei's sporty outfits, although Koneko considered the protagonists' female personas to be better drawn than their regular selves.
