= Ako and Bambi =

Japanese manga series

- First wideban volume cover

あことバンビ (Ako to Banbi)
- Genre: Coming-of-age; Romance; Supernatural
- Manga
- Written by: Hero
- Published by: Asahi Sonorama
- English publisher: NA: Yen Press
- Imprint: Sonorama+ Comics
- Magazine: Sonorama+; (February 12, 2023–July 7, 2024)
- Original run: January 25, 2020 – July 7, 2024
- Volumes: 8

Ako and Bambi (あことバンビ, Ako to Banbi) is a Japanese manga series written and illustrated by Hero. It initially began serialization on the author's Pixiv account in January 2020. It was later acquired by Asahi Sonorama who published the series on the Pixiv Comic website under their Sonorama+ brand from February 2023 to July 2024.

== Plot ==
The series is centered around Bambi, a struggling novelist, and Ako, a shy ghost. Bambi moves into a cheap apartment that's said to be haunted, and meets Ako, the ghost who haunts the apartment, and the two gradually get closer to each other.

== Publication ==
Written and illustrated by Hero, Ako and Bambi initially began serialization on the author's Pixiv account on January 25, 2020. It was later acquired by Asahi Sonorama who published the series on the Pixiv Comic website under their Sonorama+ brand from February 12, 2023, to July 7, 2024. The series' chapters were compiled into eight wideban volumes released from September 20, 2022, to October 20, 2023. The series is licensed in English by Yen Press.

| No. | Original release date | Original ISBN | North American release date | North American ISBN |
|---|---|---|---|---|
| 1 | September 20, 2022 | 978-4-02-214345-7 | February 20, 2024 | 978-1-9753-7783-0 |
1. "Ako"; 2. "Fan Letter"; 3. "Yamashiro-san"; 4. "Good Night"; 5. "Dream"; 6. "New Acquaintances"; 7. "Body Temperature"; 8. "Classmate"; 9. "Uniform"; 10. "Yuu"; 11. "Solid"; 12. "Appearance"
| 2 | September 20, 2022 | 978-4-02-214346-4 | June 18, 2024 | 978-1-9753-7785-4 |
13. "Azusa"; 14. "Protect and Be Protected"; 15. "What Makes You Happy"; 16. "Hana"; 17. "Just Missed Each Other"; 18. "Late at Night"; 19. "Duplicate Key"; 20. "Proof"; 21. "Gakuto"; 22. "Health and Peace of Mind"; 23. "Summary"; 24. "Alone in the Rain"
| 3 | December 20, 2022 | 978-4-02-214351-8 | October 22, 2024 | 978-1-9753-7787-8 |
25. "Good Morning"; 26. "Riku"; 27. "Change of Heart"; 28. "An Unfamiliar Friend"; 29. "Twilight"; 30. "Night and Day"; 31. "Blade"; 32. "To Halt"; 33. "Kanae"; 34. "This Is a Dream"; 35. "Water Drop"; 36. "Won't Disappear"
| 4 | February 21, 2023 | 978-4-02-214368-6 | January 21, 2025 | 979-8-8554-0327-5 |
37. "Eyes"; 38. "If"; 39. "Time Machine"; 40. "Side"; 41. "Nice Person"; 42. "Winter Wind"; 43. "A Place to Go Home to"; 44. "Milky Railway"; 45. "Sun"; 46. "Blank Space"; 47. "Stuttering Dreams"; 48. "Weakling"; 49. "Armadillo"
| 5 | April 24, 2023 | 978-4-02-214371-6 | May 27, 2025 | 979-8-8554-0329-9 |
50. "Kanoko-chan"; 51. "Freeze"; 52. "Who"; 53. "Detour"; 54. "Snow-Covered Road"; 55. "Forever Like This"; 56. "Normal Person"; 57. "Kind Friends"; 58. "Shaken"; 59. "Secrets"; 60. "Ambition"; 61. "Powder Snow"; 62. "The Two Of Them"
| 6 | June 20, 2023 | 978-4-02-214377-8 | November 25, 2025 | 979-8-8554-0331-2 |
63. "Now"; 64. "Palpitations"; 65. "Can't Concede On"; 66. "Leak"; 67. "Heart"; 68. "Color"; 69. "Eve"; 70. "The Hostage and the Insensitive"; 71. "Someone Next Me"; 72. "Smoke"; 73. "Author Failure"; 74. "Lingering Scent"
| 7 | August 21, 2023 | 978-4-02-214379-2 | April 28, 2026 | 979-8-8554-0333-6 |
75. "Sensei"; 76. "Release Day"; 77. "Landing"; 78. "Early Evening"; 79. "Wandering Star"; 80. "Whereabouts"; 81. "From a Dream"; 82. "Wound, Scar"; 83. "Setting Sun"; 84. "Support"; 85. "Rui"; 86. "Reflection"
| 8 | October 20, 2023 | 978-4-02-214383-9 | November 24, 2026 | 979-8-8554-0335-0 |

== Reception ==
The series was nominated for the 7th Next Manga Awards in 2021 in the web category.

== See also ==
- Hori-san to Miyamura-kun, another manga series by the same creator
