= Kimi no Koe =

Japanese manga series

- First tankōbon volume cover

君ノ声
- Genre: Historical; Romance
- Manga
- Written by: Miku Morinaga
- Published by: Line Corporation (digital); Media Factory (print)
- Imprint: Gene Line Comics
- Magazine: Line Manga
- Original run: June 30, 2020 – January 2, 2024
- Volumes: 6

Kimi no Koe (君ノ声; "Your Voice") is a Japanese manga series written and illustrated by Miku Morinaga. It was serialized on Line Corporation's Line Manga service from June 2020 to January 2024.

== Characters ==
Kazunari Kyōgoku (京極 一成, Kyōgoku Kazunari)
Voiced by: Makoto Furukawa (PV)
Nana Suwabe (諏訪部 七名, Suwabe Nana)
Voiced by: Ayaka Atsuchi (PV)

== Publication ==
Written and illustrated by Miku Morinaga, Kimi no Koe was serialized on Line Corporation's Line Manga service from June 30, 2020, to January 2, 2024. Its chapters were compiled by Media Factory into six tankōbon volumes released from November 13, 2020, to January 15, 2024.

No.	Release date	ISBN
1	November 13, 2020	978-4-04-064969-6
2	May 14, 2021	978-4-04-680348-1
3	November 15, 2021	978-4-04-680804-2
4	September 15, 2022	978-4-04-681617-7
5	May 15, 2023	978-4-04-682152-2
6	January 15, 2024	978-4-04-683023-4
