= Dana Simpson =

American cartoonist

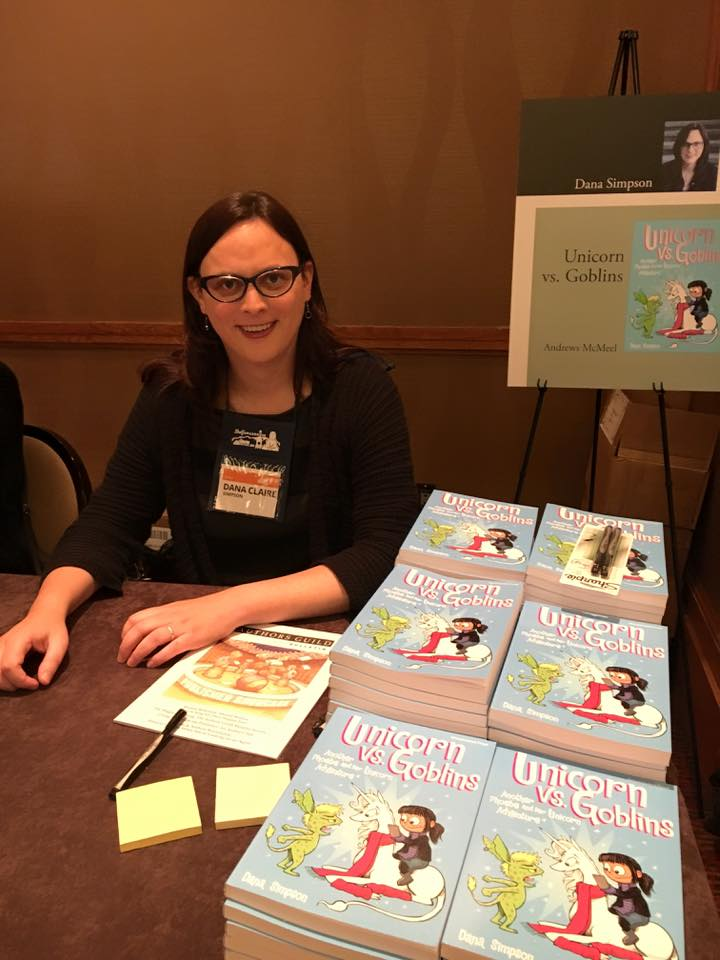
- Dana Simpson at the 2016 Winter Institute, in January, 2016, promoting 'Unicorn vs. Goblins'
- Born: Pullman, Washington, U.S.
- Occupation: Cartoonist
- Years active: 1998 - present
- Notable work: Ozy and Millie; I Drew This; Phoebe and Her Unicorn

Dana Claire Simpson is an American cartoonist, best known as the creator of the comic Phoebe and her Unicorn, as well as the long-running webcomic Ozy and Millie. Other works created by Simpson include the political commentary cartoon I Drew This and the alternate reality drama comic Raine Dog.

== Biography ==
Simpson was born in Pullman, Washington, and then lived in the Seattle area for most of her life. She is a graduate of The Evergreen State College.

Her influences comes from Jeff Smith, Walt Kelly, Berkeley Breathed, Lynn Johnston, Marjane Satrapi, Charles M. Schulz and Bill Watterson. She noted some of the comic strips have political satire in it and also liked zany characters.

Simpson considered herself an artist from an early age, drawing comic strips as young as five years old as part of making her own homemade newspaper. As she grew up, she began drawing inspiration from Peanuts, The Simpsons and Pogo.

In her 20s, she came out as transgender. She currently lives in Santa Barbara, California.

== Career ==
=== Ozy and Millie ===
The webcomic Ozy and Millie, Simpson's first published comic strip (published under D.C. Simpson), began running regularly in 1998 while she was attending Washington State University as a graduate student. The strip centered on Ozy (an Arctic fox) and Millie (a red fox) as they and their friends dealt with everyday elementary school issues and more surreal situations. For her work on Ozy and Millie, Simpson was a finalist for the 1998 Scripps-Howard Foundation Charles M. Schulz College Cartoonist Award. The comic went on to win the 1999 College Media Advisers award for Best Strip Cartoon and the 2002 Web Cartoonists' Choice Awards for Best Anthropomorphic Comic. It also won the Ursa Major Award for both "Best Anthropomorphic Other Work" for 2002 and for "Best Anthropomorphic Comic Strip" for 2006 and 2007. Simpson continued the strip for ten years while attempting to seek syndication for the title, but could not secure any deal. She cancelled the web comic in 2008 and the final strip was published on December 23, 2008.

I Drew This volume 1: Insert title here

=== I Drew This ===
Simpson's second published comic strip, I Drew This, was concerned mainly about politics, from a liberal perspective. It is semi-autobiographical, in that one of the main characters is the author (the other is Joe, the Liberal Eagle) and its focus is often the author's own musings. I Drew This began life in the Washington State University Daily Evergreen in January 2004, while Simpson was attending graduate school. Like Ozy and Millie, this comic is part of the webcomics portal Keenspot, beginning November 2006. Material from I Drew This was included in Attitude 3: The New Subversive Online Cartoonists. The May 16, 2005 edition, "Teaching Gravity", featured the first reference to the theory of intelligent falling. insert title here and I Drew This (a complete collection of the strips) are both available for purchase on Lulu. On January 20, 2009, the web comic was officially canceled, and the last strip was published prior to that, on January 12, 2009.

=== Phoebe and Her Unicorn ===
Simpson's most popular work commenced in 2012 as a web comic and continued as a daily comic strip until March 30, 2025. It continues in graphic novel format as of February 2026.

=== Other work ===
On January 16, 2009, Simpson posted the first page of Raine Dog, a graphic novel which follows an anthropomorphic dog living among humans with other recently liberated house dogs. The most recent update was in January 2010. Simpson abandoned the project "for the foreseeable future".

Simpson announced that she is writing and illustrating a book about her transition, targeted for middle-school students, titled Only You're Different. She also illustrated a picture book, I'm Not a Girl, written by Maddox Lyons, a 12-year-old transgender boy.

== Awards ==
- Scripps-Howard Foundation Charles M. Schulz College Cartoonist Award, 1998: named finalist for Ozy and Millie
- College Media Advisers, 1999: Best Strip Cartoon for Ozy and Millie
- Washington State Book Award, Scandiuzzi Children's Book Award, 2015: Books for middle readers (ages 9 to 12) for Phoebe and Her Unicorn: A Heavenly Nostrils Chronicle
- Pacific Northwest Booksellers Association Award for Unicorn on a Roll
