= Josou o Yamerarenaku Naru Otokonoko no Hanashi =

2020 manga by Kobashiko

- Volume 1 cover, featuring Kazu

女装をやめられなくなる男の子の話
- Genre: Romantic comedy
- Manga
- Written by: Kobashiko
- Published by: Kadokawa Shoten
- Imprint: MFC
- Original run: October 3, 2020 – present
- Volumes: 1

Josou o Yamerarenaku Naru Otokonoko no Hanashi (Japanese: 女装をやめられなくなる男の子の話; "A Story About a Guy Who Can't Stop Cross-Dressing") (Note: Also romanized as Josoh wo Yamerarenakunaru Otokonoko no Hanashi.) is a 2020 romantic comedy manga series written and illustrated by Kobashiko. It follows the secret cross-dresser Kazu, whose friend Masaru walks in on him while he is dressed up, and thinks Kazu has become a woman.

The manga is released by Kobashiko through their Twitter account since October 3, 2020, and is collected in print volumes by Kadokawa Shoten since May 21, 2021. The series was well received by readers, who found Kazu cute and appealing.

== Premise ==
Josou o Yamerarenaku Naru Otokonoko no Hanashi is a romantic comedy manga following Kazu, a young man who secretly has enjoyed his cross-dressing hobby for half a year. He contemplates how he would like to be called cute and treated as if he were a woman, but how he is worried about someone finding out that he likes being feminine, when his best friend Masaru walks in on him while he is wearing women's clothes. Confused by Kazu's appearance, Masaru misunderstands the situation and asks if Kazu has become a woman like in the gender-swapping manga Kazu likes to read, and calls him cute; Kazu is so happy about it that he begins diligently working on improving his cross-dressing skills further, but keeps getting interrupted by Masaru when trying to explain that he is not a woman.

== Production and release ==
Josou o Yamerarenaku Naru Otokonoko no Hanashi is written and illustrated by Kobashiko. They wrote the story themed around the happiness stemming from dressing how one wants, describing it as something they believe is good for the soul, not only for cross-dressers.

The series premiered on October 3, 2020, and is released by Kobashiko through their Twitter account. Publisher Kadokawa Shoten has released the series in print in collected tankōbon volumes under its MFC imprint since May 21, 2021, the first of which includes twenty additional pages of illustrations.

=== Volumes ===
| No. | Release date | ISBN |
|---|---|---|
| 1 | May 21, 2021 | 978-4047366503 |
Chapter 1–16
Secret cross-dresser Kazu dreams of being called cute and treated like a woman when his friend Masaru walks in on him and misunderstands, thinking that Kazu has become a woman, and interrupts his attempts to explain. Kazu enjoys being called cute by Masaru, and works at improving his cross-dressing. Masaru later invites Kazu for lunch, but Kazu worries about going outside in women's clothes. They go for a walk together, and Masaru says he wants Kazu to live life however makes him happy. When meeting Masaru's sister Shouko, she does at first not recognize Kazu, and praises him for his work on becoming feminine. Kazu gets flustered when Shouko asks if he is dating Masaru, and she offers to help him get together with Masaru. Kazu is unsure if he is attracted to Masaru and what that means for his sexuality, and gets flustered as Masaru sits next to him. Shouko lends Kazu a yukata and lingerie for the summer festival, and he goes there with Masaru, enjoying himself despite worrying about being recognized by classmates. Masaru admits that he has been aware that Kazu is not a woman for some time, but he does not mind, and they kiss.

== Reception ==
Josou o Yamerarenaku Naru Otokonoko no Hanashi is popular with readers, who liked its protagonist, calling Kazu appealing and so cute that one could forget he is not a girl; the series was ranked by Manga Navi as the tenth most popular manga about male-to-female cross-dressing as of December 2021. Excite News liked the series, describing it as full of cute moments, and enjoyed following the relationship between Kazu and Masaru as it develops.
