= Phoebe and Her Unicorn =

Children's comic strip

- Author: Dana Simpson
- Website: Phoebe and Her Unicorn at GoComics
- Current status/schedule: Running
- Launch date: April 22, 2012 (as a webcomic); March 30, 2015 (in newspapers)
- Alternate name: Heavenly Nostrils
- Syndicate(s): Universal Uclick/Andrews McMeel Syndication
- Publisher: Andrews McMeel Publishing
- Genre(s): Humor, fantasy, children

Phoebe and Her Unicorn is a daily children's comic strip by American cartoonist Dana Simpson. Originally called Heavenly Nostrils, the strip debuted as a webcomic on April 22, 2012, in Universal Uclick's GoComics website. It was later launched in more than 100 newspapers on March 30, 2015, under the current name. Simpson announced that, on March 30, 2025, the daily newspaper strip would cease, but new original material will continue to be published in graphic novels and in Sunday comic strips.

== Overview ==
The strip begins when 9-year-old Phoebe Howell skips a rock across a pond and accidentally hits a unicorn in the face. Freed from the trap of gazing at her own reflection in the pond, the unicorn, named Marigold Heavenly Nostrils, gives Phoebe one wish, which she decides to use by making the unicorn her best friend.

Marigold, like all unicorns in the series, is experienced in magic. Through various "spellcraft", she is able to perform such feats as divert or redirect rain and send text messages and broadcast a Wi-Fi hotspot through her horn. However, her most frequently-used spell is "The Shield of Boringness", which causes humans to view her as nothing out of the ordinary and allows her to interact with them on a daily basis.

Phoebe deals with childhood challenges both mundane and magical with Marigold, her friend Max, pen friend Sue, and even her arch frenemy Dakota in a quick-witted romp through a little girl's world.

== Background ==
Following the end of her earlier Ozy and Millie, Simpson provided illustrations for children's books. She also submitted a new comic idea to Amazon.com's "Comic Strip Superstar" contest in 2009, entitled Girl, which was selected the winner and received a publishing contract from Andrews McMeel Universal. Girl centered around an unnamed girl with a vivid imagination who interacts with forest creatures. The strip's launch was delayed; according to Simpson, this was imposed by the syndicate due to its reluctance to launch two "talking animal" strips at the same time, as well as its request for further edits. Simpson also noted she only had a limited number of Girl strips ready and needed more time to draw out more.

During this time, Simpson had drawn one Girl strip that included a unicorn. Soon after drawing this strip, Simpson knew that the unicorn was a necessary character to make her comic work. Girl was retooled and reimagined as Heavenly Nostrils, which is about a nine-year-old girl named Phoebe (essentially the same character from Girl) who comes across Marigold Heavenly Nostrils while the latter is enraptured by her reflection in a pond; Phoebe accidentally hits her with a rock, breaking the spell and receives a granted wish as reward.

Heavenly Nostrils was scheduled to debut on GoComics April 23, 2012, but debuted a day early on April 22, 2012. The strip entered into print syndication across 100 papers starting on March 30, 2015; the title of the strip was changed to Phoebe and her Unicorn for print syndication.

== Influences ==
Simpson drew inspiration from her real life. Phoebe herself is loosely based on Simpson's own personality. Phoebe's best friend, Max, is based on Simpson's husband David. Dakota, a fellow schoolmate of Phoebe who initially teases her until she learns about the unicorn, was an amalgamation of several students that had given Simpson trouble when she was younger, but also incorporates elements of her younger sister Nicole. Phoebe's parents are based on Simpson's friends who have become parents themselves but "they're also still the same weird people they were before they had kids". Marigold is based partially on the unicorn character in the work The Last Unicorn by Peter S. Beagle. Marigold's name was based on the results of using Simpson's own name in an online unicorn name generator.

The design of the unicorns draws inspiration from Medieval depictions, including the series of tapestries entitled The Lady and the Unicorn and The Hunt of the Unicorn. Marigold is drawn with cloven hooves and a swan-shaped body. The latter set of tapestries was referenced in the opening sequence of The Last Unicorn. Simpson has stated that the book was one of the inspirations for her comic strip.

The strip has been favorably compared to Calvin and Hobbes with a feminine slant; in contrast to Calvin and Hobbes, where the character of Hobbes is only a stuffed tiger doll that Calvin imagines is alive, Marigold the unicorn has to use magic to appear as unremarkable.

== Publications ==
Title	Publication Date	Dates Covered	ISBN
Phoebe and Her Unicorn: A Heavenly Nostrils Chronicle	2014	April 22, 2012 - November 18, 2012	ISBN 978-1-4494-4620-8
Unicorn on a Roll	2015	November 19, 2012 - June 16, 2013	ISBN 978-1-4494-7076-0
Unicorn vs. Goblins	2016	June 17, 2013 - November 25, 2013	ISBN 978-1-4494-7628-1
Razzle Dazzle Unicorn	2016	November 26, 2013 - August 7, 2014	ISBN 978-1-4494-7791-2
Unicorn Crossing	2017	September 30, 2014 - July 24, 2015	ISBN 978-1-4494-8357-9
Phoebe and Her Unicorn in the Magic Storm	2017	N/A (original graphic novel)	ISBN 978-1-4494-8359-3
Unicorn of Many Hats	2018	July 25, 2015 - January 16, 2016	ISBN 978-1-4494-8966-3
Phoebe and Her Unicorn in Unicorn Theater	2018	N/A (original graphic novel])	ISBN 978-1-4494-8981-6
Today I'll Be a Unicorn	2018	N/A (original board book)	ISBN 978-1-4494-8999-1
Unicorn Bowling	2019	January 19, 2016 - August 7, 2016	ISBN 978-1-4494-9938-9
The Unicorn Whisperer	2019	August 26, 2016 - February 19, 2017	ISBN 978-1-5248-5196-5
Camping with Unicorns	2020	May 1, 2017 - May 6, 2017 and May 29, 2017 - November 4, 2017	ISBN 978-1-5248-5558-1
Virtual Unicorn Experience	2020	November 6, 2017 - November 11, 2017 and December 4, 2017 - December 23, 2017 and December 25, 2017 - December 27, 2017 and January 1, 2018 - January 6, 2018 and January 8, 2018 - January 13, 2018 and January 15, 2018 - January 27, 2018 and January 29, 2018 - February 25, 2018 and March 4, 2018 - March 25, 2018 and April 1, 2018 - April 1, 2018 and April 8, 2018 - May 19, 2018 and June 23, 2018 - June 23, 2018	ISBN 978-1-5248-5558-1
Unicorn Famous	2021	May 28, 2018 - November 3, 2018 (not all webcomic strips from this period are included in the print edition)	ISBN 978-1-5248-6476-7
Unicorn Playlist	2021		ISBN 978-1-5248-6857-4
Unicorn Selfies	2022		ISBN 978-1-5248-7158-1
Unicornado	2022		ISBN 978-1-5248-7556-5
Punk Rock Unicorn	2023		ISBN 978-1-5248-7922-8
Unicorn for a Day	2023		ISBN 978-1-5248-8130-6
Unicorn Crush	2024		ISBN 978-1-5248-8751-3
Unicorn Time Machine	2024		ISBN 978-1-5248-9044-5
Unicorn Book Club	2025		ISBN 978-1-5248-8784-1
Galactic Unicorn	2025		ISBN 979-8-8816-0244-4
Unicorn Secrets	2026		ISBN 979-8-8816-0245-1

In addition, translations of the comic are published in France (renamed as Lucie et sa licorne), Germany (as Fibi und ihr Einhorn) Spain (as Cloe y su unicornio), Portugal (as Bia e o Unicórnio), Poland, Russia (as Фиби и единорог) and Hungary (as Phoebe és az egyszarvú).

== Other media ==
=== Scrapped television series adaptation ===
Phoebe and Her Unicorn has been optioned for a possible animated television and/or movie series adaptation twice, first by Amazon Studios in 2017 and later by Nickelodeon in 2020. Neither project ever materialized. On December 28, 2022, Dana Simpson announced that Nickelodeon was no longer pursuing the project, as the executives who had greenlit the project had been replaced by new ones who felt it would not attract a male audience.

== Awards ==
- Washington State Book Award, Scandiuzzi Children's Book Award, 2015: Books for middle readers (ages 9 to 12) for Phoebe and Her Unicorn: A Heavenly Nostrils Chronicle
- PNBA Book Award, 2016 for Unicorn on a Roll
