= Lost in Translation (webtoon) =

Webtoon by Jjolee

- Opening panel of Chapter 1 (WEBTOON Originals version)
- Genre: Slice of life; Drama
- Author: Jjolee
- Illustrator: Jjolee
- Publisher: Webtoon
- Magazine: WEBTOON (English)
- Original run: February 14, 2020 – ongoing

Lost in Translation (also stylized as LOST in TRANSLATION) is an English language webtoon written and illustrated by Jjolee. It was first published in WEBTOON's self-publishing section Canvas on July 21, 2017 and has been republished as one of the platform's "official" webtoons (WEBTOON Originals) since February 14, 2020. Set in South Korea, the webtoon follows the struggles of a rookie K-pop boy group, with particular focus on one of its members who is forced to take on a controversial persona for the sake of boosting the group's popularity.

As of March 2021, Lost in Translation has garnered 545.4 thousand subscribers, 3.3 million likes and a rating of 9.72.

== Plot ==
25-year-old K-pop idol Ahn Jae-won, a.k.a. Wyld, is a member of the rookie group Mayhem. Unbeknownst to his mother and to his co-members, he is being tormented by the group's boss who coerces him to take on a fake controversial persona in order to boost the group's popularity. As he quickly becomes, in the public eye, Mayhem's "bad boy" who is seemingly caught in successive scandals, Jae-won has to endure the suffering masked by the glamour of their rising fame while fearing he might soon become his own false persona.

The plot of Lost in Translation can de subdivided into the following story arcs:

1. Jae-won being bullied by the CEO; his struggles with Min-young (Prologue–Ch.12)
2. Jae-won and his sasaeng fan (Chs. 13–19)
3. Mayhem in the idol sports competition; the conflict between Min-soo and Min-sung (Chs. 20–32)
4. Dae-hyun and the conflict between Min-young and Min-seok (Chs. 33–39)
5. Jae-won confesses to his mother about his suffering as an idol (Chs. 40–46)
6. Dong-ho reconciles with his mother (Chs. 47–55)
7. Jae-won and Ah-ra (Chs. 56–67)
8. Jae-won tries defending Ah-ra from the CEO; Jun-su opens his story up to Jae-won (Chs. 68–78)
9. Dae-hyun learns the truth about Min-seok's hatred against Min-young (Chs. 79–94)
10. Min-seok issues a formal apology; public opinion on Jae-won starts to improve (Chs. 95–105)
11. Mayhem wins their first award (Chs. 106–113)
12. Min-soo and Min-sung reconciles (Chs. 114–118)
13. The CEO tries to cause a rift between Jun-su and Jae-won (Chs. 119–138)
14. Jae-won and Ah-ra being tormented by the CEO in a frame-up (Chs. 139–ongoing)

== Characters ==
=== Main ===
- Ahn Jae-won (Wyld)

a 25-year-old singer who is a member of the K-pop boy group Mayhem, managed by High Class Entertainment; the protagonist of the webtoon. Unbeknownst to his mother and to his co-members, Jae-won is a victim of fake scandals, falsely accused of being a pervert or a playboy, and the group's boss Mr. Park exploits these scandals to torment him by coercing him to take on a fake controversial persona in order to boost the group's popularity. In stark contrast to his supposed "bad boy" personality, in reality he is a kind yet reticent person who feels as if he is excluded from the group.

- Kim Dae-hyun (Daehyun)

a 24-year-old singer who is the youngest member (mangnae) (Note: Korean: 막내; RR: mangnae (also erroneously, albeit more commonly, romanized as maknae); Korean pronunciation: [ma̠ŋnɛ~ma̠ŋne̞] In the context of K-pop idol culture, the mangnae refers to the youngest member of an idol group (both male and female).) of the K-pop boy group Mayhem, managed by High Class Entertainment. Dae-hyun is the most extroverted of the members of Mayhem. He can easily make friends with fellow K-pop idols, including his high school friend and crush Min-young of Marshmell-o. As a perceptive kind of person, he believes in Jae-won's innocence despite the scandals hounding the co-member.

- Kang Dong-ho (D.Min)

a 28-year-old rapper and dancer who the eldest member (mathyeong) (Note: Korean: 맏형; RR: mathyeong; Korean pronunciation: [ma̠tʰjʌ̹ŋ] In the context of K-pop idol culture, the mathyeong refers to the eldest member of a male idol group.) of the K-pop boy group Mayhem, managed by High Class Entertainment. Dong-ho is a musical prodigy who hails from a rich family. He had decided to leave home in order to pursue a career as a K-pop idol. He presumes that the scandals surrounding Jae-won are true, but he later changes his views about Jae-won as he gets to know him better.

- Lee Min-soo (Minsoo)

a 27-year-old singer and dancer who is the leader of the K-pop boy group Mayhem, managed by High Class Entertainment. Min-soo appears to be an enthusiastic yet competitive leader who wants Mayhem to strive for success. This competitiveness is driven by his rivalry with his older brother Min-sung, who is a fellow idol leading the group SA1NT.

=== Supporting ===
==== People around Jae-won ====
- Jae-won's mother

Though supportive of Jae-won, she does not know that he is already an idol and is also unaware of the abuse he is suffering from his boss.

- Jun-su

a barista at Coffee Temple whom Jae-won befriended.

- Song Ah-ra

Jae-won's childhood friend who wants to audition in High Class Entertainment.

==== SA1NT ====
- Lee Min-sung (Minsung)

a 28-year-old singer who is the leader of the K-pop boy group SA1NT; Min-soo's older brother. Min-sung is involved in a rivalry with Min-soo which has started since they were teenagers.

- Im Young-joon (Young J)

a 24-year-old rapper and dancer who is a member of the K-pop boy group SA1NT. Young-joon has a crush on Dae-hyun.

- Moon Kyung-hun (Kyunghun)
- Jung Hyun-jin (Ven)
- Kim Tae-seok (Taeseok)

==== Marshmell-o ====
- Kwon Min-young (Minyoung)

the leader of the K-pop girl group Marshmell-o, managed by SHC Entertainment; Dae-hyun's crush and childhood friend. In her teenage years, Min-young bore the harsh consequences of not conforming to society's standards of beauty that she never knew about Dae-hyun's feelings for her. She drastically transformed her appearance and became an idol, but she has been suffering from body dysmorphia.

- Koko

a member of the K-pop girl group Marshmell-o, managed by SHC Entertainment.

- Yoomi

a member of the K-pop girl group Marshmell-o, managed by SHC Entertainment.

==== Others ====
- Mr. Park

the abusive and greedy CEO of High Class Entertainment; the antagonist of the webtoon. Mr. Park learns of the scandals hounding Jae-won, and he used them to his own advantage in bullying Jae-won by forcing him to take on a fake controversial persona in order to boost Mayhem's popularity.

- Na-ri

Junsu's co-worker at Coffee Temple.

- Mr. Choi

CEO of SHC Entertainment.

- So-hee

Jae-won's sasaeng fan (Note: In K-pop fandom culture, a "sasaeng fan" (Korean: 사생팬; RR: sasaengpaen; pron. [sʰa̠sʰɛŋpʰɛn] ~ [sʰa̠sʰe̞ŋpʰe̞n]) is an obsessed fan who takes his/her acts of admiration to extreme levels, usually in ways that intrude and/or threaten the privacy or security of the victimized artist. For more information, see this article.) who gained access to his apartment room and has become so obsessed with him that she can kill him if things go wrong for her.

- Min-seok

a model managed by SHC Entertainment; Dae-hyun and Min-young's high school acquaintance. Min-seok is one of those who tormented Min-young because of her looks when they were in their teens.

- Jeong-min

the butler of Dong-ho's family; Dong-ho's confidante.

- Dong-ho's mother

== Background and publication history ==
Though its serialization formally started in 2020, Lost in Translation began as a self-publishing webtoon in 2017, a "personal project" of its author, webtoon writer-illustrator Jjolee, who at that time was working in a pharmacy. On July 21, 2017, Jjolee uploaded the first chapter of Lost in Translation (then stylized as LOST in TRANSLATION) in WEBTOON through its self-publishing section Canvas where webtoon authors can earn income (through Patreon) based on page views. Two years later, WEBTOON selected it for licensing to become one of the platform's official webtoons under WEBTOON Originals. The 78th (final) chapter of the Canvas version of Lost in Translation was uploaded on July 21, 2019 and in a written message to readers ten days later, Jjolee said that there are things about the webtoon that she wants to "change and add" though she will still "keep the integrity of the [webtoon's] story."

The re-launching and serialization of Lost in Translation as part of WEBTOON Originals began on February 14, 2020 with the uploading of its prologue and first three chapters. Jjolee collaborated with Korean artists YooLee (Daniel Lee), Day6's Jae (of whom she is a fan), Kim Soo-yoon and Eliit to provide voices for its four main characters Jae-won, Dae-hyun, Dong-ho and Min-soo, respectively. YooLee, who has made music for webtoons, is also in charge for the production of two songs in the Lost in Translation universe, "Find a Way" (2020) and "Be The Change" (2021).

== Music ==
As a third generation webtoon, Lost in Translation employs the use of music as part the universe or story and as part of the overall artwork.

The following are the musical pieces that are part of the Lost in Translation soundtrack:

1. "Find a Way" (2020) - composed and performed by YooLee (Daniel Lee)
2. "Be the Change" (2021) - composed by YooLee; produced by YooLee and 220; performed by YooLee, Jae, Kim Soo-yoon and Eliit

== Reception ==
The Canvas (2017-2019) version of Lost in Translation gathered 417.2 thousand subscribers and attained a rating of 9.85 (in a 1-10 scale). As of March 2021, the ongoing WEBTOON Originals version garnered 545.4 thousand subscribers, 3.3 million likes and a rating of 9.72. The webtoon has also generated a fandom called "Mayniac", taking after the fandom of the webtoon's fictional idol group Mayhem.
