= Webtoon (platform) =

Webtoon hosting service

WEBTOON
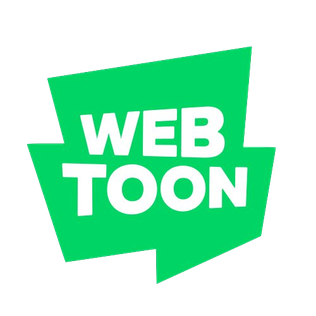
- Website type: Webtoon platform
- Available in: Multilingual
- Traded as: Nasdaq: WBTN
- Founded: 2004; 22 years ago
- Owners: Naver Corporation (59.67%); LY Corporation (23.34%)
- Creator: JunKoo Kim
- Parent: WEBTOON Entertainment
- Website: International website
- Commercial: Yes
- Registration: Optional
- Launched: 2004 (South Korea); 2014 (English, Traditional Chinese); 2014 (Thai); 2015 (Indonesian); 2019 (Spanish, French); 2021 (German)
- Current status: Active

Webtoon (stylized as WEBTOON) is a digital comics platform developed by Naver Corporation in South Korea. The service began as Naver Webtoon; NAVER's corporate history dates its official launch to December 2005, although a 2014 company announcement described it as having launched in 2004. An English-language international version launched under the name LINE Webtoon in July 2014 and was rebranded as WEBTOON in 2019.

The platform is operated by WEBTOON Entertainment Inc., a Delaware-incorporated company headquartered in Los Angeles, California. The company is a majority-owned subsidiary of NAVER Corporation.

The platform publishes professionally produced series under its WEBTOON Originals banner and hosts independently published comics through CANVAS. It offers both free and paid episodes. Readers can use Coins, an in-app currency, to unlock selected episodes through Fast Pass and Daily Pass. Super Likes, which readers purchase separately to support creators of participating series, are a separate feature. The service is accessible through its website and mobile applications.

== History ==
=== Digital comics (1997–2005) ===
Webtoons are a type of episodic digital comic that originated in South Korea, usually meant to be read on smartphones. Posting comic content for free caused the $3 billion South Korean book and comic industry to rapidly collapse. While webtoons were mostly unknown outside of South Korea during their inception, there has been a surge in popularity internationally, thanks to the easy online accessibility and variety of free online comic content. Today, Webtoons make roughly $5.91 billion in just the U.S. alone. In the country, as digital comics have emerged as a popular medium, print publication of comics has decreased. The amount of material published in webtoon form has now reached an equal amount as that published offline.

Webtoons are a sub-menu of the gate companies that began with South Korean portal services Daum and Naver. The Naver site started in 1999, but it initially had a muted response as a hidden menu. Portal sites gathered a large online audience by offering digital comics as bait. Naver, taking advantage of the unexpected success of digital comics, placed webtoons in premium advertising spaces worth 300 million Korean won on its portal surface. This significantly increased their traffic. The key to their success in the portal market was digital comics.

=== Comics platform (2005–2014) ===
Webtoon Entertainment, the serial comics platform, was founded in South Korea in 2005 by CEO Junkoo Kim, Naver. Since its launch in 2013, WEBTOON has become the most popular mobile app, catering to young adults and teens who enjoy reading comics and webcomic content. Similar webcomics can be found on these platforms, including Tapas, Pocket Comic, and others.

In 2004, they already had a market share of 80%. Kim Jun-gu, who introduced the "Bizarre Comics" genre, played a crucial role in Naver's rapid growth. In 2008, Naver introduced ads on webtoons, but they did not fairly share the ad revenue with artists.

In 2012, Naver did not participate in the legal crackdown on illegal sites that had been pirating their content for eight years. The first legal action was taken against a frame-link piracy site. In 2013, Lezhin Comics introduced a new form of payment called "Time Delay."

Naver adopted this payment model and, due to the free nature of its site, had to offer low royalties to artists. However, the influx of readers brought in significant income through search keywords, exceeding the revenue from selling comics, despite the cost of around 26,000 to 4,000 Korean Won ($20 to $3) per keyword.

Moreover, there were multiple ads. Naver absorbed the electronic publication rights of Korean artists for a small fee, which allowed them to monopolize works for a long time, even though they were not books. Mobile platforms were utilized for brand promotion, and international publishing rights were eventually obtained. Many aspiring creators submitted free comics, and the influx of free content was guaranteed as long as they were not part of the 0.1% that received a formal serialization.

Due to this discrimination, freelance creators could not unite. Some profited from this system, which improved the company's image thanks to a few star artists. The "vertical scrolling" method was used to fit more content, demanding over 100 cuts, which strained artists' health due to the excessive workload.

Kakao Webtoons' top artist, for example, died at the age of 37 due to overwork. The BBC reported on artists suffering from severe labor and exploitation. The "gate sites", which were initially established to support comics, became highly profitable.

In 2013, Webtoon launched Page Profit Share (PPS), which offered the artist a share of the advertising revenue for the first time.

=== Global launch (2014–present) ===
On July 2, 2014, the Line Webtoon website and mobile app were launched worldwide, allowing international artists to upload their own works to the service. Hundreds of webtoons are available in the self-publishing section of Webtoon, known as Canvas, where artists can be paid based on page views. JunKoo Kim, Director and Head of the Line Webtoon Division at the time of the launch, stated that a partnership with established and up-and-coming American creators would serve to "expand [Line Webtoon's] selection of titles and help [the creators] expand their fan base." Naver Corporation selected 42 webtoons (including Noblesse, Tower of God, and The God of High School) and one new webtoon by an American artist to be available on the service in English at launch. According to 148 Apps, the service offered "plenty of content" at launch, as seven to ten webtoons were updated each day and the webtoons spanned various genres.

The company's business model has expanded to include paid content sales, advertising revenue, and IP business revenue. When launched in 2013, Webtoon's programs generated 23.2 billion won. By 2022, these programs will have grown to 2.25 trillion won (USD $1.69 billion), an increase of more than 87 times.

In 2016, Webtoon Entertainment Inc. was incorporated under the Delaware General Corporation Law. In May 2020, it was announced that Webtoon was being transferred to Naver Webtoon Corp. After the purchase of Wattpad in early 2021 by Naver Corporation, both companies started to work together under Naver's content division. In June 2024, following reorganizations, Webtoon Entertainment Inc. went public.

In 2019, the international service began adopting the WEBTOON name, replacing the LINE WEBTOON branding in its Western markets. However, the change was not applied uniformly across NAVER's regional comics services. The company continued to operate NAVER WEBTOON in South Korea, LINE MANGA in Japan, and LINE WEBTOON in Southeast Asia, while using WEBTOON in the Americas and Europe. This distinction was reflected in NAVER's 2022 description of its regional services.

== Partnerships ==
=== 2013–2019 ===
In April 2013, Naver Webtoon created a Profit Page Share program. In 2015, Line Webtoon partnered with American comics veteran Stan Lee, Image Comics co-founder Marc Silvestri, and make-up artist Michelle Phan in order to promote their service. Silvestri brought his long-running comics series, Cyberforce, to the platform. Various other established American comic book artists and cartoonists have also partnered with Line Webtoon over time, including Dean Haspiel (New Brooklyn), Katie Cook (Nothing Special), Seth Kushner and Shamus Beyale (The Brooklynite), and Tracy J. Butler (Lackadaisy).

In September 2016, Line Webtoon partnered with Patreon, a crowdfunding service, incorporating a "Patreon button" in the "Discover" portion of the website. This function creates an easier channel for readers and artists to mutually communicate. Naver invested US$3.6 million and $1,000 every following month for webtoon creators who reached a certain threshold of activity and popularity with a Patreon page. One month later, Naver signed with the Creative Artists Agency for film and television opportunities in the United States.

Line Webtoon also partnered with DeviantArt in the second half of 2016, in the form of the "Artist Alley Tour". The companies were active at four comic cons: Boston Comic Con, Baltimore Comic Con, Rose City Comic Con, and New York Comic Con. Here, Line Webtoon and DeviantArt held discussion panels, "Artist Alley Sponsorships", live draw events, influencer and creator demonstration areas, and on-site contests.

In 2017, Line Webtoon and Legendary Comics expanded their partnership with the addition of John Barrowman's Acursian and season 2 of Firebrand. In 2018, they partnered with Noble Transmission and Common for the new Caster series. In 2019, Webtoon's digital content subsidiary Studio LICO collaborated with Big Hit Entertainment to release Save Me as part of the latter's BTS Universe (BU), which revolves around the output of South Korean boy band BTS.

On October 15, 2019, Crunchyroll, then owned by WarnerMedia at the time, and Line Webtoon announced a partnership to produce animated works from Line Webtoon's catalog, with the two will team up to maintaining distribution, licensing, and retail of the series produced by the partnership.

=== 2020–present ===
In October 2020, Webtoon and Archie Comics announced that the two companies would collaborate on the new Webtoon original series Archie Comics: Big Ethel Energy, which launched in September 2021.

In January 2021, Webtoon's parent company, Naver, announced that it would acquire the popular user-generated fiction platform Wattpad to provide more opportunities for creators. The acquisition was completed in May 2021. Wattpad had previously partnered with Webtoon in its 2020 Watty Awards Contest. In June 2021, Wattpad and Webtoon announced that the companies would merge their studio divisions to create Wattpad Webtoon Studios, a division of the company focused on developing Wattpad and Webtoon IP for film, television, and print publishing.

As of May 2023, around 300 projects from Webtoon and Wattpad Webtoon Studios are in development for entertainment adaptations. In August 2021, it was announced that Webtoon would be partnering with DC Entertainment to create standalone webcomics that "will appeal to all fans, without the need to know or read any previous stories."

The series is being adapted by Webtoon creators instead of established DC creators. Line Webtoon founder and CEO Junkoo Kim put it this way: "DC has allowed us to create content with their characters and world. The writers of Webtoon are creating content based on DC characters."

In November 2021, Webtoon announced a series of upcoming webcomics created in collaboration with BTS-management company Hybe and various artists from the label, including BTS, TXT, and Enhypen. These series, 7Fates: Chakho, Dark Moon: The Blood Altar, and The Star Seekers, launched on January 15, 16, and 17, 2022, respectively.

The first announced DC collaboration was a Batman-oriented title, Batman: Wayne Family Adventures. Additional series within this partnership, Vixen: NYC, Red Hood: Outlaws, and Zatanna & the Ripper, were announced in April 2022. Webtoon has also partnered with Rewriting Extinction, the global 12-month comic storytelling campaign supporting seven charities involved in biodiversity conservation and the climate crisis, featuring comics from the likes of Jane Goodall.

The adapted, celebrity-created comics from the campaign launched on Webtoon on December 23, 2022. Marvel Entertainment partnered with Webtoon in January 2022 to create the seven-part miniseries Eternals: The 500 Year War, which launched in tandem with the Eternals' arrival for at-home viewing.

The video game PUBG: Battlegrounds joined Webtoon's growing slate of partnerships in January 2022 with the creation of three new digital comics based on the fantasy world in the Krafton video game. In May 2022, Webtoon and McDonald's USA partnered to celebrate Asian and Pacific American voices through a webcomic series called Drawing on Heritage.

In April 2023, Webtoon announced a creative partnership with Ubisoft on Assassin's Creed: Forgotten Temple, an original webcomic set in the Assassin's Creed universe. The series is published by Redice Studio. Webtoon teamed up with Discord in May 2023 and announced a dedicated Webtoon Discord server as well as a content collaboration for the original webcomic miniseries Wumpus Wonderventures, created in partnership with Merryweather Media.

In March 2024, Dark Horse partnered with Webtoon to republish "the entire run of Avatar: The Last Airbender comics online on the Webtoon platform". Then in 2025, this partnership expanded to include the "vertical scroll digital versions of The Witcher, The Legend of Korra, Critical Role: The Mighty Nein Origins, Cyberpunk 2077, and Plants vs. Zombies"; the latter four series are exclusive to Webtoon.

In March 2025, Webtoon partnered with Dropout to launch a comic adaptation of Fantasy High, the first campaign of the actual play webseries Dimension 20. In April 2025, they partnered with IDW Publishing to release IDW comics reformatted for the Webtoon platform starting with Godzilla: Unnatural Disasters, Beneath the Trees Where Nobody Sees by Patrick Horvath, and They Called Us Enemy by George Takei. In April 2026, it was announced that Webtoon Entertainment was collaborating with artificial intelligence (AI) avatar technology company Genies. The partnership would let creators make their characters into interactive AI avatars. In June 2025, MyFutprint Entertainment's Saturday AM partnered with Webtoon to republish a slate of the publisher’s most popular series to the Webtoon platform. The first wave will include flagship series like Apple Black, Clock Striker, and Hammer. The Saturday AM series will launch on the platform throughout the second half of 2025. Through this collaboration, Webtoon and Saturday AM will "further expand the reach of these powerful stories, featuring creators and characters across a wide range of backgrounds, races, ethnicities, genders, and sexualities."

On September 15, 2025, The Walt Disney Company and WEBTOON Entertainment announced a proposed strategic agreement to develop a digital comics platform and a planned 2% equity investment in WEBTOON Entertainment. The agreements, including the equity investment, were completed on January 8, 2026.

In February 2026, Disney and WEBTOON announced an original vertical-scroll comic series, Mickey x F1: Racing to the Top!, as part of Disney and Formula One's wider Fuel the Magic campaign. The series premiered on WEBTOON on March 6, during the 2026 Australian Grand Prix, and features Mickey Mouse, Minnie Mouse, Donald Duck, and Goofy helping a racing team in difficulty. New episodes were scheduled to be released throughout the Formula One season in connection with race weekends.

The wider Disney–Formula One campaign also included merchandise and retail collaborations. Products announced for 2026 included racing-themed apparel, accessories, collectibles, and a Mickey Mouse plush dressed in a Formula One uniform. Collaborations with eyewear company Gentle Monster and clothing retailer Uniqlo were also announced, alongside merchandise releases and retail pop-ups at selected Grand Prix events.

In August 2026, Disney and Formula One extended the Fuel the Magic collaboration through the 2028 season, with the addition of Disney and Pixar's Cars franchise to the partnership.

In August 2026, Disney Publishing announced Disney Cursed Love, an original romantasy comic initiative developed for WEBTOON. The first instalment, The Curse of a Forsaken Heart, is written by Emily McIntire and illustrated by Samairu. The story features Belle and the Beast from Beauty and the Beast, who are transported to a magical kingdom where they encounter Princess Emberlynne and Lucan. The webcomic is scheduled to debut on WEBTOON before receiving print editions in multiple formats in 2027.

On October 8, 2026, Crunchyroll, and its subsidiary Hayate Inc., and LINE Digital Frontier, a subsidiary of WEBTOON Entertainment, announced a co-production partnership to develop potential anime adaptations of around 15 webtoon titles, beginning with The Boxer, The Remarried Empress, and Teenage Mercenary, as announced in New York Comic Con. Hayate will lead development and production in collaboration with the other partners, while its parent, Crunchyroll, will stream the resulting series in certain territories.

== Userbase ==
The userbase of Webtoon grew rapidly after the service was released globally, with 10 million people reading on the platform daily and 35 million people monthly. In Asia, several webtoons receive 5 million views per week. In 2016, 42% of the webtoon creators on Line Webtoon were female, as were 50% of its 6 million active daily readers. 75% of the users in North America are 24 or younger, and 64% are female.

Between 2020 and 2021, Webtoon paid out more than $27 million to its base of more than 120,000 creators who publish in English. In Korea, top creators earn an average of $250,000 per year. The top creator earned around $9 million in 2021.

As of March 2023, Webtoon had grown to receive more than 125 billion views annually. It has 85.6 million monthly active users worldwide and has become the top webcomic platform in the U.S., with 12.5 million monthly active users.

== Coins ==
WEBTOON uses coins as a virtual currency that readers can purchase through the Android and iOS versions of its mobile application. Readers can utilize coins to support their favorite creators and access paid episodes through features such as Fast Pass and Daily Pass. The number of coins required to unlock an episode varies depending on the series being read. Coins can also be used through the Title Purchase feature to unlock all purchasable episodes of selected completed series at a discounted price.

For each Daily Pass series, the users have option to unlock one episode for free each day. Once unlocked, each Daily Pass episode remains accessible for 14 days. Alternatively, users may use coins to unlock these episodes, which allows access to them for as long as the series is available on WEBTOON.

Fast Pass allows readers to access selected episodes of ongoing series before their regular release dates, with the episodes becoming available for free after a specified period. Ad Pass provides another method of unlocking eligible episodes by watching advertisements. Episodes unlocked through Ad Pass remain accessible for three days, while those unlocked using coins remain available for as long as the series is hosted on WEBTOON.

== Contests ==
Naver Corporation has held various comics competitions through its Webtoon service. In 2015, Line launched the "Challenge League", a recurring competition where amateur artists have the chance to become "official Line webtoon artists", as well as win tens of thousands of US dollars. Over 19,000 people joined the first English-language Challenge League in February 2015, which was won by Stephen McCranie's Space Boy. Local Challenge Weeks were also held; the first Thai Challenge League was held in April 2015 and had a grand prize of 1 million baht.

In June 2015, Naver Corporation hosted the Science Fiction Comics Contest, a global competition with a grand prize of US$30,000. JunKoo Kim called science fiction, the theme of the competition, "both the broadest and fastest-growing area in comics and entertainment, [and thus] a natural fit as the genre for our second comics contest." This contest had over 800 entrants and was won by Srinitybeast's Overdrive.

In November 2018, Webtoon hosted their Discover Creator Contest. The winner, Kris Nguyen's Cape of Spirits, received a grand total of US$80,000 and an exclusive contract for the series.

On February 28, 2020, "The Short Story Contest" was announced. Running from April 30 to June 30, the contest was split into two categories: "heart" and "brain". The grand prize winners of each category would get US$15,000, an animated short, and a featured contract, with the subsequent winners being Marvin W.'s The Monster Under My Bed for "Heart" and Kotopopi's and Kibbitzer's The Ladder for "Brain". The grand prize, silver, and bronze contest winners were published in two anthologies: the Heart Anthology, which was released in September 2020, and the Brain Anthology, which was released in October 2020.

Between April 2020 and July 2020, Webtoon ran an interactive contest series titled Webtoon GREENLiGHT, wherein nine titles were selected and pitched to readers. The readers then voted (by liking the series' episodes) on which series would be "greenlit" as a new original series. Within one week, each series had to reach a record threshold of 60,000 likes on its third episode in order to be "greenlit" for publication. All nine series succeeded and were released in 2021.

In the summer of 2022, Webtoon started a new contest for their users to create an action comic called Call to Action, where the winner got US$50,000 and a chance to be a Webtoon original.

In August 2022, Webtoon announced a Valorant contest held in conjunction with Riot Games, having fans submit original artwork depicting their interpretations of the character Fade, with ten webcomics selected as winners. In January 2023, WEBTOON announced the winners of its 2022 CANVAS Awards, an annual competition recognizing creators and series published on its CANVAS platform. The competition featured 48 fan-nominated series across 11 categories, with category winners receiving US$5,000, an opportunity to develop merchandise with WEBTOON, and additional marketing support. The top three entries in the "Hidden Gems" category received US$500 each.

In January 2025, WEBTOON Entertainment and Capcom announced the Monster Hunter Wilds Webcomic Contest, the first competition under WEBTOON's new Branded Contest program. The competition invited creators to submit original webcomics inspired by the Monster Hunter franchise, based on three prompts. The contest was judged by representatives from WEBTOON Entertainment and Capcom, with three grand prize winners and nine runner-up winners receiving merchandise and copies of Monster Hunter Wilds.

In November 2024, WEBTOON announced Webcomic Legends, a global contest for creators on its English-language CANVAS platform, which launched in March 2025. The competition featured four genre categories: action and fantasy, romance and drama, comedy and slice of life, and horror, thriller, mystery and supernatural. Its prize pool exceeded US$1 million, with 40 entries receiving cash prizes and opportunities to join the WEBTOON Originals program.

In September 2025, WEBTOON announced the winners of the inaugural Webcomic Legends contest. Akikakie's Covenant once given won the grand prize of US$150,000 and the Most Epic category, while other category winners included Vago_XD's UNVEILING YOU, heiMO.'s My Dear Watson, and Lucía Cid's I want to kiss 100 monster girls!. The competition received nearly 4,000 entries and generated over 5.3 million views.

== In media ==
=== Other media into webtoons ===
Some webtoons on the platform are adaptations of YA novels, including:

- Renée Ahdieh's The Wrath & the Dawn
- Rebecca Schaeffer's Not Even Bones
- Hanna Alkaf's The Weight of the Sky
- Victoria Lee's The Fever King
- Nicki Pau Preto's Crown of Feathers
- Patrick Flores-Scott's American Road Trip
- Rebecca Sullivan's Night Owls and Summer Skies
- Kate Marchant's Float

Many South Korean webtoons on the platform are adaptations of web novels, including titles such as:

- The Omniscient Reader's Viewpoint is written by a Korean author duo under the alias Sing Shong and drawn by Sleepy-C from Redice Studios.
- The Remarried Empress (which also became a mobile game and audio drama and was collected and published in paperback format by Yen Press's Ize Press imprint)
- So I Married the Anti-Fan (based on this novel, which also got adapted into both a Chinese film and a Korean TV series).
- Like Wind on a Dry Branch

On June 23, 2021, it was announced that the 2018 film On Your Wedding Day will be adapted into a webtoon, to be serialized on webtoon platforms Naver and Kakao.

A webtoon based on a TV series Our Beloved Summer is a prequel about the high school days of the two main characters of the TV series (Choi Woong and Kuk Yeon-su).

The Korean drama Extraordinary Attorney Woo has also been adapted as a webcomic on Webtoon.

Batman: Wayne Family Adventures, a series based on the Batman family from DC Comics, began serialization in September 2021.

Eternals: The 500 Year War, a series based on the Eternals from Marvel Comics and prequel to the 2021 film, released on January 20, 2022.

=== Webtoons into other media ===
==== Published format (English) ====
- Space Boy was published in paperback by Dark Horse Books.
- Hooky was published in paperback by Clarion Books.
- Lore Olympus was published in paperback by Random House Worlds.

Yen Press, via its imprint Ize Press, has collected and published several other of Webtoon's titles as paperbacks, including:

- 7Fates: Chakho
- Dark Moon: The Blood Altar
- My Gently Raised Beast
- The Boxer
- The Remarried Empress (see above)
- The Star Seekers
- The World After the Fall

Rocketship Entertainment has collected and published several of Webtoon's titles, including:

- #Blessed
- 1000
- Adventures of God
- Assassin Roommate
- Brothers Bond
- Cupid's Arrows
- Darbi
- Girls Have a Blog
- Late Bloomer
- Let's Play
- Live Forever
- Metaphorical Her
- Outrage
- Spirits: The Soul Collector
- Stan Lee's Backchannel
- The Croaking
- Urban Animal
- undeadEd
- Wolfsbane

Webtoon, after its acquisition of Wattpad, announced in 2021 a new imprint, Webtoon Unscrolled. Through it, Webtoon will be publishing print editions of its own titles, including:

- Boyfriends
- Cursed Princess Club
- Doom Breaker
- Everything Is Fine
- True Beauty
- Tower of God
- The God of High School
- Freaking Romance
- GremoryLand
- Noblesse
- Lumine
- SubZero graphic novel from Oni Press
- unOrdinary graphic novel from HarperCollins

Webtoon has begun serializing other titles. In 2021, they announced that the popular webcomic Lore Olympus would be adapted as a series of print graphic novels, published by Del Rey Books. Volumes 1, 2, and 3 of the print adaptation were published on November 2, 2021, July 5, 2022, and October 11, 2022, respectively, with all three reaching No. 1 on The New York Times Best Seller list. Volume 4 was published on June 6, 2023, and Volume 5 will be released on October 3, 2023.

In October 2022, Webtoon launched Yonder, a serialized fiction app where readers can purchase and read one chapter at a time. At the time of launch, Yonder offered more than 700 titles as a part of a carefully curated collection.

==== Film and animation ====
Various movies, Korean dramas, animated series, and video games have been produced based on webtoons released on Naver Corporation's service. According to JunKoo Kim in 2014, "a total of 189 books, videos, and games based on Naver webtoons have either been produced or are in the process of being made." However, Line Webtoon's first entry of video content in the U.S. came in 2016, in the form of an animated film based on Noblesse.

On November 7, 2016, Air Seoul announced that it had collaborated with Line Webtoon to produce pre-flight safety demonstration videos. Some of the works featured in these include Denma, The Sound of Heart, and Noblesse.

In July 2019, Webtoon produced their first promotional animated short series from one of their exclusive originals, My Giant Nerd Boyfriend. A second set of promotions from the work Let's Play was released in September 2019.

In October 2019, Crunchyroll revealed on Instagram that it would be collaborating with Webtoon to release animated series based on selected webtoons as a part of its "Crunchyroll Originals" project. In February 2020, Crunchyroll announced that Noblesse, Tower of God, and The God of High School were chosen for later release.

A growing body of Webtoon adaptations now regularly stream on Netflix, Disney+, Crunchyroll, and other platforms. In fall 2022, Netflix saw strong performances for an adaptation of Lookism, and Disney+ released an adaptation of Connect from acclaimed director Takashi Miike. Webtoon subsidiary Wattpad Webtoon Studios has multiple series in development, including an adaptation of A Rasen's Gremoryland with Vertigo Entertainment and an animated adaptation of Rachel Smythe's Lore Olympus in conjunction with The Jim Henson Company.

Several webcomics that started on Webtoon have provided the source IP for popular TV and film adaptations launched by major streamers and distributors. For example, the Netflix hit series All of Us Are Dead, Hellbound, and Sweet Home.

=== Platform statistics ===
Recent statistics for WEBTOON Entertainment
Metric	Figure	Period	Scope
Monthly active users (MAU)	156.9 million	Q2 2026	Global services
Monthly paying users (MPU)	7.5 million	Q2 2026	Global services
Webcomic stories	Over 500,000	December 2025	Platform ecosystem
Webcomic creators	Approximately 400,000	December 2025	Platform ecosystem
Google Play downloads	100 million+	November 2026	Android app
Annual revenue	US$1.38 billion	FY 2025	WEBTOON Entertainment
Quarterly revenue	US$338.5 million	Q2 2026	WEBTOON Entertainment

NOTE: MPU, MAU, and revenue are collective ecosystem-wide metrics(including WEBTOON, LINE MANGA, NAVER SERIES, eBookJapan, Munpia and Wattpad) rather than standalone WBTOON app metrics.

== List of adapted webtoons ==
Below is a list of Naver Webtoon titles adapted into television series, web series, and films.

Title	Creator(s)	Format	Premiere	Notes	Ref.
Welcome to Convenience Store (와라! 편의점)	Ji Kang-min	Animated series	January 17, 2012	Broadcast on Tooniverse	
The Cliff (절벽귀)	Oh Seong-dae	Omnibus film	June 5, 2013	Adapted in the first episode	
Fashion King (패션왕)	Kim Hee-min	Film	November 6, 2014	YLAB, Nomad Films	
Dr. Frost (닥터 프로스트)	Lee Jong-beom	TV series	November 23, 2014	Broadcast on OCN	
Orange Marmalade (오렌지 마말레이드)	Seok-woo	TV series	May 15, 2015	Broadcast on KBS2	
We Broke Up (우리 헤어졌어요)	Ryu Chae-rin	Web series	June 29, 2015	Broadcast on Naver TV and YouTube	
Noblesse (노블레스)	Son Je-ho and Lee Kwang-su	Animation	December 4, 2015	DVD release by Woongjin Thinkbig Funnism	
Noblesse (노블레스)	Son Je-ho and Lee Kwang-su	ONA	February 4, 2016	Crunchyroll release	
Noblesse (노블레스)	Son Je-ho and Lee Kwang-su	Anime	October 7, 2020	Crunchyroll release Broadcast on Tokyo MX	
Cheese in the Trap (치즈인더트랩)	Soonkki	TV series	January 4, 2016	Broadcast on tvN	
Cheese in the Trap (치즈인더트랩)	Soonkki	Film	March 14, 2018	Exclusive premiere in CGV theaters	
Lucky Romance (운빨로맨스)	Kim Dal-nim	TV series	May 25, 2016	Broadcast on MBC	
Let's Fight, Ghost (싸우자귀신아)	Im Man-sup	TV series	July 11, 2016	Broadcast on tvN	
The Sound of Your Heart (마음의 소리)	Jo Seok	Web series	November 7, 2016	Broadcast on Naver TV and KBS2	
The Sound of Your Heart (마음의 소리)	Jo Seok	ONA	September 20, 2018	Naver Webtoon YouTube Channel release	
The Sound of Your Heart (마음의 소리)	Jo Seok	Web Series	October 29, 2018	Netflix release	
Tales of the Unusual (기기괴괴)	Oh Seong-dae	TV special	April 29, 2017	Adapts short story My Wife's Memories in an episode	
Tales of the Unusual (기기괴괴)	Oh Seong-dae	ONA	February 21, 2019	Naver Webtoon YouTube Channel release	
Tales of the Unusual (기기괴괴)	Oh Seong-dae	Animated Film	September 9, 2020	Adapts the short story Beauty Water	
Do It One More Time (한번 더 해요)	Hong Seung-pyo and Kim Hye-yeon	TV series	October 13, 2017	Broadcast on KBS2	
unTOUCHable (언터처블)	massstar	Web series	November 20, 2017	Broadcast on Sohu TV	
Along with the Gods (신과함께)	Joo Ho-min	Film	December 20, 2017	Realies Pictures, Dexter Studios	
Along with the Gods (신과함께)	Joo Ho-min	Film	August 1, 2018	Realies Pictures, Dexter Studios	
Student A (여중생 A)	Heo 5 Pa 6	Film	June 20, 2018	Lotte Entertainment	
Girls of the Wild's (소녀더와일즈)	Hun and Zhena	TV series	July 23, 2018	Broadcast on Hunan TV	
My ID is Gangnam Beauty! (내 ID는 강남미인!)	Ki Maeng-gi	TV series	July 27, 2018	JTBC release	
My ID is Gangnam Beauty! (내 ID는 강남미인!)	Ki Maeng-gi	Thailand TV series	2024	GMM25 release	
Before We Knew It (文学処女)	Nakano Mayaka	TV series	September 9, 2018	Broadcast on MBS and TBS	
Tale of Fairy (계룡선녀전)	Dol Bae	TV series	November 5, 2018	Broadcast on tvN	
A Fake Affair (偽装不倫)	Higashimura Akiko	TV series	July 10, 2019	Broadcast on Nippon TV	
Hell Is Other People (타인은 지옥이다)	Kim Yong-ki	TV series	August 31, 2019	Broadcast on OCN	
Pegasus Market (쌉니다 천리마마트)	Kim Gyu-sam	TV series	September 20, 2019	Broadcast on tvN	
Lookism (외모지상주의)	Pak Tae-jun	Web series	September 26, 2019	Broadcast on Tencent Video	
Lookism (외모지상주의)	Pak Tae-jun	Web animation	December 8, 2022	Netflix release	
The Tale of Nokdu (녹두전)	Hye Jin-yang	TV series	September 30, 2019	Broadcast on KBS2	
Eggnoid	Archie the RedCat	Film	December 5, 2019	No US release yet	
Welcome (어서와)	Go A-ra	TV series	March 25, 2020	Broadcast on KBS2	
Tower of God (신의 탑)	SIU	Anime	April 1, 2020	Crunchyroll release Broadcast on Tokyo MX	
Odd Girl Out (소녀의 세계)	Morangji	Web series	April 22, 2020	Broadcast on Naver TV, V LIVE, and YouTube	
Boy and Girl Straight Out of Cartoon (만찢남녀)	Nimni	Web series	June 25, 2020	Broadcast on YouTube and MBC	
The God of High School (갓 오브 하이스쿨)	Park Yong-je	Anime	July 6, 2020	Crunchyroll release Broadcast on Tokyo MX	
Love Revolution (연애혁명)	232	Web series	September 1, 2020	Broadcast on KakaoTV and Naver SERIES	
Marry Me! (マリーミー!)	Miku Yuki	TV series	October 3, 2020	Broadcast on TV Asahi and ABC TV	
True Beauty (여신강림)	Yaongyi	TV series	December 9, 2020	Broadcast on tvN	
Sweet Home (스위트홈)	Kim Carnby and Hwang Young-chan	Web series	December 18, 2020	Netflix release	
My Roommate Is a Gumiho (간 떨어지는 동거)	Na	TV series	May 26, 2021	Broadcast on tvN	
Nevertheless (알고있지만)	Jung Seo	TV series	June 19, 2021	Netflix release	
Yumi's Cells (유미의 세포들)	Lee Dong-gun	TV series	September 17, 2021	tvN and TVING release	
Yumi's Cells (유미의 세포들)	Lee Dong-gun	Animated film	April 3, 2024	Produced by Locus Corporation (a.k.a. Sidus Animation Studios)	
Hellbound (지옥)	Yeon Sang-ho and Choi Kyu-seok	TV series	November 19, 2021	Adaptation of animations by Yeon Sang-ho. Netflix release	
A DeadbEAT's Meal (백수세끼)	Cheese	Web series	December 10, 2021	TVING and NaverTV release	
All of Us Are Dead (지금 우리 학교는)	Joo Dong-geun	TV series	January 28, 2022	Netflix release	
Love and Leashes (모럴센스)	Gyeoul	Film	February 11, 2022	Netflix release	
Tomorrow (내일)	Llama	TV series	April 1, 2022	MBC TV and Netflix release	
My Daughter Is a Zombie (좀비딸)	Lee Yun-chang	Animated series	April 3, 2022	EBS and Naver SeriesOn release	
My Daughter Is a Zombie (좀비딸)	Lee Yun-chang	Film	2025		
Annarasumanara (안나라수마나라)	Ha Il-kwon	TV series	May 6, 2022	Netflix release	
Code Helix	Nikki Dibya Wardhana and Bryan Arfiandy	Web series	June 15, 2022	SinemArt and Nyra Studio	
Moon You (문유)	Cho Seok	Chinese film	July 29, 2022		
Seasons of Blossom (청춘 블라썸)	HONGDUCK and NEMONE	TV series	September 21, 2022	Wavve release	
Seasons of Blossom (청춘 블라썸)	HONGDUCK and NEMONE	Animated series	2024		
The Golden Spoon (금수저)	HD3	TV series	September 23, 2022	MBC TV release	
Connect (커넥트)	Shin Dae-sung	TV series	December 7, 2022	Disney+ (Star) and Hulu release	
Unlock My Boss (사장님을 잠금해제)	Park Seong-hyun	TV series	December 7, 2022	ENA release	
Island (아일랜드)	Youn In-wan and Yang Kyung-il	TV series	December 30, 2022	TVING release	
Romance 101 (바른연애 길잡이)	Namsoo	TV series	January 1, 2023	TV Asahi release	
Duty After School (방과 후 전쟁활동)	Ha Il-kwon	TV series	March 31, 2023	TVING release	
The Ghost of Oksu Station (옥수역 귀신)	Horang	Film	April 19, 2023	Adaptation of one of stories in webtoon Horang's Nightmare	
The Girl Downstairs (이두나!)	Min Song-a	Chinese animation	April 20, 2023	Bilibili release	
The Girl Downstairs (이두나!)	Min Song-a	TV series	October 20, 2023	Netflix release	
Black Knight (택배기사)	Lee Yun-kyun	TV series	May 12, 2023	Netflix release	
Bloodhounds (사냥개들)	Jeong Chan	TV series	June 9, 2023	Netflix release	
See You in My 19th Life (이번 생도 잘 부탁해)	Lee Hey	TV series	June 17, 2023	tvN and Netflix release	
Mask Girl (마스크걸)	Mae-mi, Hee-se	TV series	August 18, 2023	Netflix release	
Possessed (빙의)	Fresh and Kim Hong-tae	Film	September 29, 2023	CJ Entertainment	
A Good Day to be a Dog (오늘도 사랑스럽개)	Lee Hey	TV series	October 11, 2023	MBC TV release	
Vigilante (비질란테)	CRG and Kim Gyu-sam	TV series	November 8, 2023	Disney+ (Star) and Hulu release	
Death's Game (이제 곧 죽습니다)	Lee Won-sik and Ggulchan	TV series	December 15, 2023	TVING release	
A Killer Paradox (살인자ㅇ난감)	Kkomabi	TV series	February 9, 2024	Netflix release	
Pyramid Game (피라미드 게임)	Dalgonyak	TV series	February 29, 2024	TVING release	
Chicken Nugget (닭강정)	Park Ji-dok	TV series	March 15, 2024	Netflix release	
Viral Hit (싸움독학)	Pak Tae-jun and Kim Jung-hyun	Anime	April 11, 2024	Broadcast on Fuji TV (+Ultra)	
Viral Hit (싸움독학)	Pak Tae-jun and Kim Jung-hyun	TV series	June 11, 2026	Netflix	
Money Game (머니게임)	Bae Jin-soo	TV series	May 17, 2024	Netflix release	
Pie Game (파이게임)	Bae Jin-soo	TV series	May 17, 2024	Netflix release	
Mom, I'm Sorry (맘마미안)	MiTi and GuGu	Chinese animation	May 23, 2024	Bilibili release	
Senpai is an Otokonoko (先輩はおとこのこ)	Pom	Anime	July 5, 2024	Broadcast on Fuji TV (Noitamina)	
Perfect Family (완벽한 가족)	Nyangpa and Joo-eun	TV series	August 14, 2024	KBS2 release	
Jeong Nyeon (정년이)	Seo Ireh and Namon	TV series	October 12, 2024	tvN release	
No Home (집이 없어)	Wannan	Animated series	November 1, 2024	Laftel release	
1 Second (1초)	Sini and Kwangwoon	Animated series	November 24, 2024	EBS release	
1 Second (1초)	Sini and Kwangwoon	TV series	TBA	Disney+ and Hulu release	
Study Group (스터디그룹)	Shin Hyung-wuk and Ryu Seung-yeon	TV series	January 23, 2025	TVING release	
Friendly Rivalry (선의의 경쟁)	Song Chae-yun and Shim Jae-young	TV series	February 10, 2025	U+ Mobile TV release	
Plaza Wars (광장)	Oh Se-hyung and Kim Gyun-tae	TV series	June 6, 2025	Netflix release	
S Line (S 라인)	Kkomabi and Angmabi (Kkomabi)	TV series	July 11, 2025	Wavve release	
Omniscient Reader's Viewpoint (전지적 독자 시점)	Sing Shong	Film	July 23, 2025	Lotte Entertainment	
Omniscient Reader's Viewpoint (전지적 독자 시점)	Sing Shong	Anime	TBA		
Let's Play	Mongie	Anime	October 2, 2025	Fuji TV (+Ultra)	
Spirit Fingers (스피릿 핑거스)	Han Kyoung-chal	TV series	October 29, 2025	TVING release	
Dear X (친애하는 X)	Vanziun	TV series	November 6, 2025	TVING release	
Terror Man (테러맨)	Han Dong-woo and Ko Jin-ho	Animated series	January 29, 2026	TVING release	
Whale Star: The Gyeongseong Mermaid (고래별)	Na Yoonhee	TV series	2027	tvN	
Nano List (나노리스트)	Min Song-a	Animated series	TBA	TVING release	
Reawakened Man (부활남)	Chae Yong-taek and Kim Jae-han	Film	TBA	TBA	
This Life to the Next (고인의 명복)	Jo Joo-hee and Yuno	TBA	TBA	TBA	
Batman: Wayne Family Adventures	CRC Payne	TV series	TBA	TBA	
Gosu (고수)	Ryu Gi-un and Mun Jeong-hoo	Anime	TBA	TBA	
The Boxer (더 복서)	Jung Ji-hoon	Animated series	TBA	TBA	
Get Back (겟백)	Seyoon	TV series	TBA		
The Year We Turned 29 (아홉수 우리들)	Lady Watermelon	TV series	TBA	TBA	
Mirae's Antique Shop (미래의 골동품 가게)	Gu A-jin	Animated series	TBA	TBA	
Return of the Blossoming Blade (화산귀환)	Biga	Animated series	TBA	TBA	

== Awards and nominations ==
Year	Award	Category	Nominee	Author(s)	Result	Ref
2017	Ringo Awards	Fan Favorite Villain	Arlo, from unOrdinary	uru-chan	Won	
2017	Ringo Awards	Best Humor Comic	Adventures of God	Teo and Corey	Nominated	
2017	Ringo Awards	Best Humor Comic	Bluechair	Shen	Nominated	
2017	Ringo Awards	Best Webcomic	Siren's Lament	instantmiso	Nominated	
2017	Ringo Awards	Best Webcomic	The Red Hook	Dean Haspiel	Won	
2017	Ringo Awards	Best Webcomic	unOrdinary	uru-chan	Nominated	
2018	Eisner Awards	Best Webcomic	Brothers Bond	Kevin Grevioux and Ryan Benjamin	Nominated	
2018	Ringo Awards	Fan Favorite Hero	Mags, from Assassin Roommate	Monica Gallagher	Won	
2018	Ringo Awards	Fan Favorite Villain	Arlo, from unOrdinary	uru-chan	Won	
2018	Ringo Awards	Fan Favorite New Series	I Love Yoo	Quimchee	Won	
2018	Ringo Awards	Fan Favorite Publisher	Line Webtoon		Won	
2018	Ringo Awards	Best Humor Comic	Boyfriend of the Dead	Ushio	Nominated	
2018	Ringo Awards	Best Humor Comic	My Giant Nerd Boyfriend	fishball	Nominated	
2018	Ringo Awards	Best Webcomic	1000	Chuck Brown and Sanford Greene	Won	
2018	Ringo Awards	Best Webcomic	I Love Yoo	Quimchee	Nominated	
2018	Ringo Awards	Best Webcomic	Siren's Lament	instantmiso	Nominated	
2018	Ringo Awards	Best Webcomic	War Cry	Dean Haspiel	Nominated	
2019	Eisner Awards	Best Webcomic	Lavender Jack	Dan Schkade	Nominated	
2019	Eisner Awards	Best Webcomic	Let's Play	Mongie	Nominated	
2019	Eisner Awards	Best Webcomic	Lore Olympus	Rachel Smythe	Nominated	
2019	Ringo Awards	Fan Favorite Hero	Clove, from Toaster Dude	soaporsalad	Won	
2019	Ringo Awards	Fan Favorite New Series	Luff	Arechan	Won	
2019	Ringo Awards	Best Humor Comic	Bluechair	Shen	Nominated	
2019	Ringo Awards	Best Humor Comic	Love Advice from the Great Duke of Hell	unfins	Nominated	
2019	Ringo Awards	Best Webcomic	Age Matters	Enjelicious	Nominated	
2019	Ringo Awards	Best Webcomic	Lavender Jack	Dan Schkade	Nominated	
2019	Ringo Awards	Best Webcomic	Luff	Arechan	Nominated	
2019	Ringo Awards	Best Webcomic	Nothing Special	Katie Cook	Nominated	
2020	Eisner Awards	Best Webcomic	Third Shift Society	Meredith Moriarty	Nominated	
2020	Ringo Awards	Fan Favorite Hero	Clove, from SubZero	Junepurrr	Won	
2020	Ringo Awards	Fan Favorite Villain	John, from unOrdinary	uru-chan	Won	
2020	Ringo Awards	Best Webcomic	The Croaking	echorise	Nominated	
2020	Ringo Awards	Best Webcomic	Lore Olympus	Rachel Smythe	Nominated	
2020	Ringo Awards	Best Webcomic	SubZero	Junepurrr	Nominated	
2021	Eisner Awards	Best Webcomic	The Kiss Bet	Ingrid Ochoa	Nominated	
2021	Harvey Awards	Digital Book of Year	Lore Olympus	Rachel Smythe	Won	
2021	Ringo Awards	Fan Favorite Hero	Persephone, from Lore Olympus	Rachel Smythe	Won	
2021	Ringo Awards	Fan Favorite Villain	Emma, from My Deepest Secret	Hanza Art	Won	
2021	Ringo Awards	Fan Favorite New Series	Midnight Poppy Land	Lilydusk	Won	
2021	Ringo Awards	Best Series	Lore Olympus	Rachel Smythe	Nominated	
2021	Ringo Awards	Best Series	My Deepest Secret	Hanza Art	Nominated	
2021	Ringo Awards	Best Webcomic	Midnight Poppy Land	Lilydusk	Nominated	
2021	Ringo Awards	Best Webcomic	Shiloh	Kit Trace and Kate Flynn	Nominated	
2021	Ringo Awards	Best Humor Webcomic	Cursed Princess Club	LambCat	Nominated	
2022	Eisner Awards	Best Webcomic	Batman: Wayne Family Adventures	CRC Payne and StarBite	Nominated	
2022	Eisner Awards	Best Webcomic	Lore Olympus	Rachel Smythe	Won	
2022	Harvey Awards	Digital Book of Year	Everything Is Fine	Mike Birchall	Nominated	
2022	Harvey Awards	Digital Book of Year	Lore Olympus	Rachel Smythe	Won	
2022	Ringo Awards	Fan Favorite New Series	Clinic of Horrors	Merryweather and PokuriMio	Won	
2022	Ringo Awards	Best Webcomic	Archie Comics: Big Ethel Energy	Keryl Brown Ahmed and Siobhan	Nominated	
2022	Ringo Awards	Best Webcomic	Batman: Wayne Family Adventures	CRC Payne and StarBite	Nominated	
2022	Ringo Awards	Best Webcomic	Let's Play	Mongie	Nominated	
2022	Ringo Awards	Best Webcomic	Lore Olympus	Rachel Smythe	Won	
2022	Ringo Awards	Best Humor Webcomic	Love Advice from the Great Duke of Hell	unfins	Nominated	
2023	Eisner Awards	Best Webcomic	Lore Olympus	Rachel Smythe	Won	
2023	Harvey Awards	Digital Book of Year	Everything Is Fine	Mike Birchall	Nominated	
2023	Harvey Awards	Digital Book of Year	Lore Olympus	Rachel Smythe	Won	
2023	Ringo Awards	Fan Favorite Villain	Adam, from The Guy Upstairs	Hanza Art	Won	
2023	Ringo Awards	Fan Favorite New Series	Nevermore	Kate Flynn and Kit Trace	Won	
2023	Ringo Awards	Best Webcomic	The Guy Upstairs	Hanza Art	Nominated	
2023	Ringo Awards	Best Webcomic	I Love Yoo	Quimchee	Nominated	
2023	Ringo Awards	Best Webcomic	Lore Olympus	Rachel Smythe	Won	
2023	Ringo Awards	Best Humor Webcomic	Finding Fiends	LizardxLizard	Nominated	
2023	Ringo Awards	Best Humor Webcomic	Live with Yourself!	Shen and David J Catman	Nominated	
2023	Ringo Awards	Best Humor Webcomic	Vampire Husband	Scragony	Nominated	
2024	Eisner Awards	Best Webcomic	Lore Olympus	Rachel Smythe	Won	
2024	Eisner Awards	Best Webcomic	3rd Voice	Evan Dahm	Nominated	
2024	Harvey Awards	Digital Book of Year	Boyfriends	Refrainbow	Nominated	
2024	Harvey Awards	Digital Book of Year	Encore	Miles Burks	Nominated	
2024	Harvey Awards	Digital Book of Year	Heir's Game	suspu	Nominated	
2024	Harvey Awards	Digital Book of Year	Lore Olympus	Rachel Smythe	Nominated	
2024	Harvey Awards	Digital Book of Year	unOrdinary	uru-chan	Nominated	
2024	Harvey Awards	Digital Book of Year	Of Swamp and Sea	Mia Jay Boulton and Laurel Boulton	Nominated	
2024	Ringo Awards	Fan Favorite Hero	Lenore, from Nevermore	Kate Flynn and Kit Trace	Won	
2024	Ringo Awards	Fan Favorite Villain	Montresor, from Nevermore	Kate Flynn and Kit Trace	Won	
2024	Ringo Awards	Fan Favorite New Series	City of Blank	66	Won	
2024	Ringo Awards	Best Webcomic	The Guy Upstairs	Hanza Art	Nominated	
2024	Ringo Awards	Best Webcomic	I'm Dating a Psychopath	NoSleepAreWe	Nominated	
2024	Ringo Awards	Best Webcomic	Lore Olympus	Rachel Smythe	Won	
2024	Ringo Awards	Best Webcomic	Nevermore	Kate Flynn and Kit Trace	Nominated	
2024	Ringo Awards	Best Webcomic	Señorita Cometa	Arechan	Nominated	
2024	Ringo Awards	Best Humor Webcomic	Bluechair	Shen	Won	
2024	Ringo Awards	Best Humor Webcomic	Not So Shoujo Love Story	Curryuku	Nominated	
2024	Ringo Awards	Best Humor Webcomic	Vibe Check!	Ucheomaaa	Nominated	

== See also ==
- Kakao Webtoon
- Line Manga
- Studio N, a film studio that produces drama adaptations of Naver Webtoon series
- Tapas (website)
