= AOG =

AOG may refer to:

- 152d Air Operations Group, a unit of the New York Air National Guard
- Abscisate beta-glucosyltransferase, an enzyme
- Aircraft on ground, an aviation term
- Anshan Teng'ao Airport, IATA code AOG
- AOG desk, a dedicated aviation logistics service
- Adventures of God, a Belgian webtoon series
- Army of God (United States), a Christian terrorist organization in the United States
- Assemblies of God
  - Australian Christian Churches
  - Assemblies of God in Great Britain
- Appellation d'Origine Garantie, fourteen wine-producing regions of Morocco
- Association of Graduates for the United States Military Academy
- A US Navy hull classification symbol: Gasoline tanker (AOG)
