= Trapped (webcomic) =

South Korean webcomic

올가미 Olgami
- Genre: Romance, Fantasy, Psychological thriller, Vampire fiction, Enemies-to-lovers
- Author: Haemuri
- Publisher: Naver Webtoon

Trapped (Korean: 올가미), also known as Olgami, is a South Korean webtoon written and illustrated by Haemuri. It began serialization on Naver Webtoon on September 2, 2019. The series is categorized under romance, fantasy, and psychological thriller genres, notably featuring an enemies-to-lovers dynamic and vampire themes.

== Synopsis ==
The story revolves around the complex and volatile relationship between Chae-a Han and Yunsu Park. Chae-a, an ex-convict with a troubled past, works as a taxi driver, while Yunsu appears to be a respectable churchgoer but is secretly a powerful vampire. Their lives become entangled when Yunsu blackmails Chae-a over a murder she did not commit. Initially, Chae-a attempts to find a way to escape Yunsu's control, leading to a dangerous game of cat and mouse where the balance of power constantly shifts. As the narrative progresses, their dynamic evolves from a predator-and-prey relationship filled with manipulation and deceit into a deeply intertwined and often "toxic" yet compelling romance. Both characters, shaped by their own traumas, struggle with understanding and expressing love, leading to a slow-burn development of their feelings. The webtoon explores themes of survival, revenge, and the complexities of unhealthy relationships, often with a dark and gruesome portrayal of vampirism.

== Characters ==
Chae-a Han (한채아): The female protagonist, initially portrayed as a foul-mouthed ex-convict and a resilient survivor. She is intelligent and headstrong, constantly trying to outwit Yunsu and fight for her freedom, even resorting to morally ambiguous means.

Yunsu Park (박윤수): The male protagonist, a vampire who blackmails Chae-a. He is initially depicted as a cruel and manipulative figure, but his character develops throughout the story, revealing his own vulnerabilities and capacity for love, albeit expressed in a "twisted" manner.

== Publication ==
Trapped was written and illustrated by Haemuri. It premiered on Naver Webtoon in South Korea on September 2, 2019. The series has garnered significant readership and has been discussed extensively across online communities.
