= Monica Gallagher =

Monica Gallagher may refer to:

- Monica Gallagher (comics artist), comics artist
- Monica Gallagher (fictional character), character in Shameless
- Dame Monica Gallagher (community worker) (1923–2013)
