= Lucifer Morningstar =

Lucifer Morningstar may refer to:

== DC Comics ==
- Lucifer (DC Comics), a DC Comics character
  - Lucifer Morningstar, a character in the films Constantine (2005) and the forthcoming Constantine 2
  - Lucifer Morningstar (Lucifer), a character in the TV series Lucifer and The Flash
  - Lucifer Morningstar, a character in the TV series The Sandman

== Other media ==
- Lucifer Morningstar, a main character in the webtoon Adventures of God
- Lucifer Morningstar, a character in the TV series Chilling Adventures of Sabrina
- Lucifer Morningstar (Hazbin Hotel), a supporting character in the animated series Hazbin Hotel (2024–present)
