= One Second =

One Second may refer to:

- One Second (film), a 2020 film
- One Second (Yello album), 1987
- One Second (Paradise Lost album), 1997, or the title track
- "One Second", a song by Stormzy from his 2019 album Heavy Is the Head

== See also ==
- 1 Second, a 2019 South Korean manhwa series author by Sini and illustrated by Kwang Woon
