= Mirae's Antique Shop =

South Korean webtoon

미래의 골동품 가게 RR: Miraeui goldongpum gage MR: Miraeŭi koltongp'um kage
- Genre: Thriller
- Author: Gu Ah-jin
- Webtoon service: Naver Webtoon
- Original run: March 3, 2020 – March 31, 2023
- Volumes: 3

Mirae's Antique Shop
- Country of origin: South Korea

Production
- Production company: Tooneed Entertainment

Mirae's Antique Shop (Korean: 미래의 골동품 가게) is a South Korean manhwa released as a webtoon written and illustrated by Gu Ah-jin. It was serialized via Naver Corporation's webtoon platform, Naver Webtoon, from March 2020, with the individual chapters collected. A South Korean animated series adaptation by CJ ENM and Tooneed Entertainment has been announced.

== Media ==
=== Manhwa ===
Gu Ah-jin launched Mirae's Antique Shop in Naver's webtoon platform Naver Webtoon on March 3, 2020.

==== Volume list ====
No.	Korean release date	Korean ISBN
1	March 31, 2023	979-1-15-925752-0
2	March 31, 2023	979-1-15-925753-7
3	March 31, 2023	979-1-15-925754-4

== Reception ==
The webtoon won the Presidential Award in the cartoon category at the 2022 Korea Contents Awards, and was praised as a monumental work that made a mark.
