= No Home =

South Korean webtoon

집이 없어 RR: Jibi eopseo MR: Chibi ŏpsŏ
- Genre: Drama
- Author: Wanan
- Webtoon service: Naver Webtoon (Korean)
- Original run: December 31, 2018 – September 9, 2024

No Home
- Country of origin: South Korea
- Original language: Korean

Production
- Production company: Studio Lico

Original release
- Network: Laftel
- Release: November 1 – November 15, 2024

No Home (Korean: 집이 없어) is a South Korean manhwa released as a webtoon written and illustrated by Wanan. It was serialized via Naver Corporation's webtoon platform, Naver Webtoon, from December 2018, with the individual chapters collected. A South Korean animated series adaptation by Studio Lico has been transmitted on Laftel in November 2024.

No Home/Homeless (alternate title) is a slice-of-life drama webtoon about 6 high school students, primarily Haejoon Goh and Eunyung Baek, who have both but different troubled backgrounds who end up reluctantly sharing an abandoned dorm. The story follows their emotional journey as they struggle to heal, navigate their clashing personalities, and confront the trauma of their pasts.

== Media ==
=== Manhwa ===
Wanan launched No Home in Naver's webtoon platform Naver Webtoon on December 31, 2018, and is currently a completed series of 269 chapters.

=== Plot ===
The story follows two high school students who are both homeless, each carrying the weight of their own painful past.

The story began when Haejoon Goh decided to live in a dorm just to get away from his home. He particularly chose Hansol High School that offers dorms to its students for his purpose while studying. But while he was on his way after he inquired the dorm applications in Hansol High School, he got bump with a boy with blonde hair and red hairpin (Eunyung Baek). The bump looks like a typical accident and Haejoon let it go easily. But after of few minutes, he realizes that his only money that he saved for a long time was already gone together with his wallet. He eventually figured out that it was the blonde boy who stole his money.

Enraged by his unfortunate fate, he desperately look for the blonde boy only to find him living near a dump space under a tent only. There he learns the blonde boy's name and he was Eunyung Baek (which was actually a girl's name). Eunyung, on the other hand, ran away from home too with his own reason and forced to live under a tent. Living in a tent while he was still a teenager must have been difficult that is why he has no choice to do whatever it takes for him to survive alone and that includes stealing.

After Haejoon rushed on Eunyung's place, they began fighting especially Haejoon was insisting to have his money back, and Eunyung's tent got even tored-up by Haejoon because of his wrath. Not until Eunyung accidentally stabbed him in his stomach. That is where their twisted story began. Due to those circumstances, they found themselves sharing the same dorm that the Hansol-high offered to them, but it was not like the dorms that every student dreamt of anymore especially for Haejoon who misses the dorm applications because he have to recover in the hospital first after he got stabbed. It was an abandoned dorm - let alone a haunted dorm, and they have to share it with each other while having each other's pride wanting to stay despite having many reasons they could have.

A lot has happened inside that house and both of them faces difficulty in coming-of-age and character development especially with their hostile relationship that all started with "that" bump. But as the story goes, they find themselves helping each other despite all that. Beyond the two of them, four other students enter their lives and eventually become part of their circle of friends. Each of these teenagers carries their own story, their own burdens, which are gradually revealed as they grow closer. Together, the six of them form an unlikely bond, built on shared hardships and mutual understanding. Among them, however, Haejoon and Eunyung stand apart—the only ones without a home, shaped most directly by the harsh realities of their pasts.

=== Cast ===
1. Haejoon Goh - a problem boy but he is physically strong and emotionally distant, shaped by a life that forced him to toughen up early. For years, he was bullied because of his mother, and those experiences hardened him—turning him into someone others now fear. However, he was one of the most intelligent students in class. His resentment toward Eunyung runs deep, especially after their very first encounter, when Eunyung stole his money. So when he discovers that they will be living together in the school dormitory, he is both shocked and irritated.

2. Eunyung Baek - Eunyung, on the other hand, is a year younger than Haejoon, though they stand at the same height. Where Haejoon is reserved and quietly kind, Eunyung is lively, reckless, and often shameless. He is a troublemaker—known for stealing and having an irritating attitude that causes fights. His good looks have earned him popularity at school, making him something of a local celebrity among their peers. But beyond his charm and appearance, there seems to be something else he can take pride in. Eunyung is still attending high school, but it is clear he drifts through it without any real sense of purpose.

3. Juwan Park - Juwan Park is the same age as Haejoon and is also decided to live in the dormitory alongside him and Eunyung. Naturally friendly and easygoing, Juwan has a cheerful personality that draws people toward him. However, he tends to be careless with his belongings, often losing them without realizing it. Kind-hearted and patient, Juwan often finds himself acting as the mediator between Haejoon and Eunyung whenever their arguments flare up, bickering like cats and dogs.

4. Marie Kim - She serves as the president of their school's journalism club and is the same age as Juwan Park and Haejoon. Despite being the smallest in their group of friends, Marie Kim carries herself with a quiet confidence that makes her presence felt. Marie is kind by nature, but she also has a sharp, calculating side. She harbors a certain irritation toward Minju Gong.

5. Hara Kang - She is Juwan's closest friend—a constant presence by his side. Tall and athletic, Hara naturally stands out, making her one of the more well-known students at their school. Her abilities are not limited to sports; she is also academically capable, able to keep up with Haejoon in class without falling behind. Yet behind her composed and capable image lies a quiet struggle.

6. Minju Gong - She is Juwan's former childhood sweetheart. Minju Gong is undeniably beautiful, but her personality can be difficult at times, which often leads to tension—especially between her and Marie Kim. The two share a strained relationship, marked by unspoken rivalry and irritation. She eventually taken an interest for Haejoon, but Haejoon has no interest to anybody aside from his studies.

== Reception ==
The webtoon won the Presidential Award and Korea Manga Video Promotion Agency in the cartoon category at the 2022 Korea Contents Awards and the 2023 Korea Comic Critics Exhibition, and was praised as a monumental work that made a mark.
