= Mom, I'm Sorry =

2019–2021 South Korean webtoon

맘마미안 RR: Mammamian MR: Mammamian
- Genre: Drama, Slice of Life
- Author: MiTi
- Illustrator: GUGU
- Webtoon service: Naver Webtoon (Korean); Line Webtoon (English)
- Original run: June 8, 2019 – July 10, 2021
- Volumes: 4

Mom, I'm Sorry (Korean: 맘마미안; Chinese: 邂逅她的少女时代; pinyin: Xièhòu tā de shàonǚ shídài) is a South Korean manhwa released as a webtoon written by MiTi and illustrated by GUGU. It was serialized via Naver Corporation's webtoon platform, Naver Webtoon, from June 2019 to July 2021, with the individual chapters collected and published into 4 volumes. The manhwa has been published in English by Line Webtoon. A Chinese animated series premiered on Bilibili on May 23 to September 19, 2024.

== Characters ==
- Gong Hyo-chan (Korean: 공효찬)
- Alchemy Prison (Korean: 연금옥)
- Lifespan Dealer

== Media ==
=== Manhwa ===
MiTi launched Mom, I'm Sorry in Naver's webtoon platform Naver Webtoon on June 8, 2019.

==== Volumes ====
No.	Korean release date	Korean ISBN
1	December 24, 2020	979-1-19-111903-9
2	December 24, 2020	979-1-19-111904-6
3	December 24, 2020	979-1-19-111905-3
4	December 24, 2020	979-1-19-111906-0

=== Donghua ===
Mom, I'm Sorry
- Country of origin: China
- Original language: Chinese
- No. of episodes: 18

Production
- Animators: GOINDOL; Red Dog

Original release
- Network: Bilibili
- Release: May 23 – September 19, 2024

A donghua series based on webtoon of the same name premiered on Bilibili on May 23, 2024.
