= The Boxer (manhwa) =

2019–2022 South Korean webtoon

- Manhwa cover of The Boxer volume 1

더 복서 RR: Deo bokseo MR: Tŏ poksŏ
- Genre: Action, drama, sports
- Author: Jung Ji-Hoon
- English publisher: NA: Yen Press
- Webtoon service: Naver Webtoon (Korean); Line Webtoon (English)
- Original run: December 15, 2019 – June 16, 2022
- Volumes: 11
- Anime television series
- Directed by: Takehiro Kubota; Won Yeong Kang
- Written by: Toshiya Ono
- Studio: Breccia; Studio Jemi
- Licensed by: Crunchyroll

The Boxer (Korean: 더 복서) is a South Korean manhwa released as a webtoon written and illustrated by Jung Ji-Hoon. It was serialized via Naver Corporation's webtoon platform Naver Webtoon from December 2019 to June 2022, with the individual chapters collected and published into 11 volumes. A Japanese-South Korean anime television series adaptation produced by Breccia and Studio Jemi has been announced.

== Characters ==
Yu
Voiced by: Koki Uchiyama (Japanese)
Ryu
Voiced by: Kensho Ono (Japanese)
K
Voiced by: Tomokazu Seki (Japanese)
J
Voiced by: Toshiyuki Toyonaga (Japanese)

== Media ==
=== Manhwa ===
Jung Ji-Hoon launched The Boxer in Naver's webtoon platform Naver Webtoon on December 15, 2019. During their panel at Anime Expo 2022, Yen Press announced that they licensed the manhwa in English under their Ize Press imprint.

==== Volumes ====
No.	Original release date	Original ISBN	English release date	English ISBN
1	October 15, 2021	979-1-13-628242-2	December 20, 2022	979-8-40-090008-2
2	February 11, 2022	979-1-13-628937-7	April 18, 2023	979-8-40-090011-2
3	May 17, 2022	979-1-19-122543-3	July 18, 2023	979-8-40-090017-4
4	September 2, 2022	979-1-16-918492-2	October 24, 2023	979-8-40-090018-1
5	November 23, 2022	979-1-16-944668-6	January 23, 2024	979-8-40-090019-8
6	March 16, 2023	979-1-16-944935-9	April 23, 2024	979-8-40-090020-4
7	June 23, 2023	979-1-17-062061-7	July 23, 2024	979-8-40-090021-1
8	November 30, 2023	979-1-17-124996-1	October 22, 2024	979-8-40-090022-8
9	April 14, 2024	979-1-17-203085-8	January 21, 2025	979-8-40-090023-5
10	August 30, 2024	979-1-17-288355-3	April 22, 2025	979-8-40-090024-2
11	January 24, 2025	979-1-14-230440-8	July 22, 2025	979-8-40-090025-9

=== Anime ===
A Japanese-South Korean anime adaptation was announced in April 2023. It was later confirmed during Crunchyroll's panel at New York Comic Con 2026 to be television series produced by Breccia and Studio Jemi with Hayate Inc. handling general production and directed by Takehiro Kubota and Won Yeong Kang, with Toshiya Ono handling series composition and screenplays and Masahiro Suwa designing the characters. Crunchyroll will stream the series.

== Reception ==
In reviewing the first volume, Noemi10 from Anime UK scored the manhwa a 5 out of 10, criticizing the bullying portrayed in the volume as "extreme" and the reason the main character becomes a boxer as "being forced".
