= Let's Play (comic) =

Web comic series by Leeanne M. Krecic

- Let's Play banner art
- Author: Mongie (Leeanne M. Krecic)
- Website: tapas.io/series/Lets-Play-official; WebToon (formerly; comic removed)
- Launch date: 2016
- Publishers: Webtoon; Rocketship Entertainment
- Genre: Romance
- Ratings: 9.63 Stars on Webtoon; 5.0 out of 5 stars on Amazon

- Let's Play

Let's Play クエストだらけのマイライフ (Retsu Purē Kuesuto-darake no Mai Raifu)
- Genre: Romantic comedy
- Created by: Mongie (Leeanne M. Krecic)
- Anime television series
- Directed by: Daiki Tomiyasu
- Written by: Aya Matsui
- Music by: Conisch
- Studio: OLM Division 1
- Licensed by: Crunchyroll
- Original network: Fuji TV (+Ultra)
- Original run: October 2, 2025 – December 18, 2025
- Episodes: 12

Let's Play is a romantic comedy comic series by Leeanne M. Krecic, also known as Mongie, which is published by Rocketship Entertainment. Let's Play was published digitally on Webtoon from 2016 to 2022. It follows the romantic and professional life of Sam Young, who is discovering romance as she works on her video game development career.

Let's Play has over 7.5 million subscribers globally on Webtoon and was nominated for an Eisner Award in 2019. In May 2021, it was announced that the comic would be adapted into a live-action television series by Allnighter. In November 2022, Krecic announced that the comic would be moving away from Webtoon, citing ongoing difficulties with the platform, and that the series will continue with season four elsewhere. In September 2025 the series relaunched on Tapas. An anime television series adaptation produced by OLM aired from October to December 2025.

== Premise ==
Let's Play is a romantic comedy. It follows Sam Young, a 22-year-old female software developer looking to get into video games, a passion she developed while sick in hospital. Sam's passion project, Ruminate, gets heavily criticized by a game reviewer going by "Marshall Law", and his many fans review-bomb it. After this, Marshall Law becomes Sam's new next-door neighbor.

Sam's father is the CEO of software company Young Technologies; he is overprotective of Sam and wants her to take over the company some day, but Sam would rather make video games. At the same time, Sam, who has never had a romantic relationship, starts to feel attraction. She considers dating an old friend, Link, though the two remain friends instead. She has romantic tension with Marshall Law, and becomes flirty with her manager at Young Technologies, Charles, who is teaching her to be more confident and business savvy. Charles also falls for Sam, despite her being his boss's daughter. Season two of the comic ended with Sam drunkenly trying to seduce Charles at his apartment.

Let's Play explores and satirizes gaming culture and the male-dominated gaming industry. Storylines cover depression, anxiety, and family.

== Characters ==
Sam Young
Voiced by: Kana Hanazawa (Japanese); Lacey Deline (English)
The female main protagonist, who is an aspiring video game designer and creator of Ruminate, an indie puzzle adventure game. She works as a software developer at her father's family company. In the MMORPGWorld of Warquest, Sam is the powerful wizard Ariadne, and raids with #3 guild The Rare Spawns.
Bowser
Voiced by: Kenta Miyake (Japanese); Meg McClain (English)
Sam's Boston terrier, and the inspiration for a dragon that serves as the final boss of Ruminate.
Marshall Law
Voiced by: Shimba Tsuchiya (Japanese); Brandon Acosta (English)
A popular ViewTube video game influencer who becomes Sam's next-door neighbor. In World of Warquest, he is Black Mage Dion.
Charles Jones
Voiced by: Yuichi Nakamura (Japanese); Nick Huber (English)
The manager of Young Technologies and Sam's boss.
Link Hudson
Voiced by: Tomokazu Sugita (Japanese); Monty Thompson (English)
A long-time friend and, briefly, love interest of Sam. Sam and Jasmine may have based the design of a prince in Ruminate on him.
Angela O'Neill
Voiced by: Ayane Sakura (Japanese); Monica Rial (English)
One of Sam's friends. Angela is a very protective towards Sam despite having an aggressive personality with a hot temper. In World of Warquest, Angela's avatar character is Signy the Valkyrie. In Ruminate, Sam based a knight character on Angela.
Vikki Song
Voiced by: Yōko Hikasa (Japanese); Dani Chambers (English)
One of Sam's friends. Vikki is Angela's roommate and works as a yoga instructor. In World of Warquest, Vikki's avatar character is Vixie.
Monica McKenzie
Voiced by: Mie Sonozaki (Japanese); Corey Pettit (English)
Marshall's girlfriend, a successful ViewTube beauty streamer and fashion influencer.
Dallas Hudson
Voiced by: Hiroshi Watanabe (Japanese); Tristan Bonner (English)
One of Sam's friends. Dallas is Link's younger brother. In World of Warquest, Dallas' avatar character is xXNightKillerXx the Rogue.
Abe Calhoun
Voiced by: Kengo Tsujii (Japanese); Wes Frazier (English)
One of Sam's friends. Abe is the guildmaster of The Rare Spawns in the World of Warquest. His avatar character is Yemoja the Druid. In Ruminate, Sam cast him as a ranger.
Olivia Sweet
Voiced by: Minami Kurisaka (Japanese); Emi Lo (English)
One of Sam's friends. Olivia is a young mute and deaf girl who reads lips uses a text-to-speech app on her phone to communicate with others. In the World of Warquest, Olivia's avatar character is Lily-chan, the party's healer.
Edgar
Voiced by: Kenichirou Matsuda (Japanese); Larry Brantley (English)
Olivia's butler and a fellow gaming member of The Rare Spawns.
Lucy Wright
Voiced by: Sumire Morohoshi (Japanese); Jordan Colea (English)
Sam's friend at work. Lucy works at Young Technologies as a receptionist.
Umed Patel
Voiced by: Tasuku Hatanaka (Japanese); Abi Kumar (English)
An employee of Young Technologies. Umed is Sam's co-worker with full knowledge of the video game industry.
Dee Parker
Voiced by: Mitsuki Saiga (Japanese); Amber May (English)
The owner of a coffee shop, The Daily Grind. Dee used to be roommates with Sam in college.
Samuel A. Young
Voiced by: Kenta Miyake (Japanese); John Burgmeier (English)
The CEO of Young Technologies and Sam's overprotective father.
Jasmine Flores
Voiced by: Mikako Komatsu (Japanese); Jasmine Renée Thomas (English)
A college friend of Sam's, she did the art design for Ruminate then worked in the industry for a while before she got discouraged and joined her mother working in real estate.

== Publication ==
Let's Play is created by Leeanne M. Krecic, who writes and illustrates the comic under the pen name Mongie. Krecic has said that she created the comic "because I was looking for characters like me – die-hard gamers, heartfelt romantics, and young women with dreams of success on their own terms – but couldn't find them represented anywhere in the pop culture of the moment."

The comic debuted on Webtoon in 2016. It finished season two in August 2020 and finished season three in September 2022. Krecic said in a tweet that the start of season three was delayed by contractual negotiations.

Let's Play volume one was kickstarted for publication in 2019 by Rocketship Entertainment and volume two was kickstarted in 2020.

In November 2022, Krecic announced that season four of Let's Play would not be published through Webtoon. Krecic cited age gates, a lack of marketing, and racial pay disparities among the reasons. Krecic said that they would, "when the time is right" announce when and how season four would be published.

== Reception ==
=== Readership figures ===
Forbes described Let's Play as "megapopular"; according to Webtoon it had 3.6 million subscribers as of May 2021, and had received 145 million views by the end of 2019. The comic has had two Kickstarter campaigns through publisher Rocketship Entertainment that in total raised nearly $1 million USD. It has been one of the most popular series published by Webtoon.

Forbes said that Let's Play was in a genre not well-served by "the traditional comics industry", and that works like Let's Play are "finding [their] way directly to a new generation of readers [through internet platforms], and [readers] are feeling seen and validated by those stories."

=== Reviews ===
A writer for Forbes said that Let's Play "takes a light but thoughtful touch on a hot-button issue, playing up the romantic comedy elements in the manner of a Friends or New Girl aimed at the generation raised on YouTube and Twitch." A writer for ComicBook.com said that Let's Play "deftly mixes Internet and gaming humor". A writer for Bleeding Cool said, "Krecic's engaging story, which is both romantic and funny, works in tandem with her anime-inspired art style to make readers all for her cast of dynamic characters."

In a review for Women Write About Comics, columnist Claire Napier called Let's Play "a responsible comic, and a compassionate one", noting the creator's personal experience in tech and on YouTube, and saying, "None of the characters exist to be hated or looked down on, and the founding premise, that joining a hate mob is being part of a harmful effect, is a necessary part of today's discourse." However, Napier felt that the comic lacked structural tension, saying that it "introduces itself as tightly reined enemies-to-lovers with a strong #online flavour, but quickly relaxes into a three, four, or five-pronged friendship-group/colleague soap loosely centred upon one floppy character." Napier called the art "basically frictionless – Questionable Content meets seasonal anime", adding that "every gamer in this comic either has a Men's Fitness cover body or a huge, buoyant rack on a tall thin frame". She said that the dialogue was often "quite explainer-text, but this does allow for absolute clarity of theme." She concluded that it was not a comic she loved, but said it had "some clever jokes and visual gags and it is agreeably bawdy at times", and recommended it for those who like soap operas or have "ever stanned a real life let's player".

=== Awards ===
Let's Play was nominated for an Eisner Award in 2019 for Best Webcomic.

== Adaptations ==
=== Live-action series ===
In May 2021, studio Allnighter announced a development deal to adapt Let's Play into a live-action television series, with Krecic, Amanda Kruse, Dinesh Shamdasani, Hunter Gorinson, and Tom Akel serving as executive producers. A columnist for Forbes said that this was "another sign that the serialized GenZ-friendly comics published on mobile platforms such as Webtoon are a rising force in the media industry".

=== Anime series ===
In October 2023, at New York Comic Con, Mongie announced that OLM would be producing an anime television series adaptation of the comic. It is directed by Daiki Tomiyasu, with series composition handled by Aya Matsui, Ebimo as the original character designer, Saki Ebisawa as the animation character designer, and music composed by Conisch. The series aired from October 2 to December 18, 2025, on Fuji TV's +Ultra programming block. (Note: Fuji TV listed the series premiere on October 1 at 24:45, which is effectively October 2 at 12:45 a.m. JST.) The opening theme song is "1,2, Play", while the ending theme song is "Left & Right", both performed by Toshinobu Kubota. Crunchyroll streamed the series.

==== Episodes ====
No.	Title	Directed by	Storyboarded by	Original release date
1	"Life is S-Rank"	Ayumi Moriyama	Daiki Tomiyasu	October 2, 2025
Samara "Sam" Young successfully completes a quest with her guild Rare Spawns in the game World of Warquest. The next day, Sam starts her day visiting her favorite coffee shop, The Daily Grind, and discusses about how popular Ruminate, an indie puzzle adventure game that she worked on since college, is on the game review site Indigineer. Sam heads to work at Young Technologies, a technology company run by her father Samuel Young. After her lunch break, a delivery man conversing with the company receptionist Lucy Wright accidentally causes Sam to spill coffee on her sweater. Sam's boss Charles Jones calls her in to lend her a shirt, while talking about the need to take a tough stance against those making mistakes as Samuel's eventual successor, meaning firing Lucy for her mistake, but Sam defends her and demands that she be fired along with Lucy, which impresses Charles. After work, Sam watches Marshall Law's livestream and Marshall heavily criticizes Ruminate after playing it the wrong way, while his viewers bombard her game with scathing reviews. Afterwards, Sam steps out and sees that Marshall is moving into the apartment next door.
2	"I am N00b"	Ayae Shinkai	Daiki Tomiyasu	October 9, 2025 (Note: This episode aired at 1:10 a.m. JST, 25 minutes after the regular air time on Fuji TV.)
Despite wanting to let Marshall know that he played Ruminate the wrong way, Sam opts not to speak her mind and politely greets him instead. The next day, Sam talks with her gaming friends at The Daily Grind about how her gaming career is being jeopardized by Marshall's livestream with her Indigineer account suspended. At work, Sam asks her co-worker Umed Patel for advice and Umed plans to look into the matter, while expressing his criticism of the ratings system. That night, Sam is informed by her landlord Whipple about Marshall moving in and has her greeting him in his apartment. As Sam continues to work on her next indie game, Evermake, despite her suspended account Marshall causes lots of noise during his livestream. Sam writes a note about the noise, and Marshall responds promising to soundproof his apartment. The next day, while Sam walks her dog Bowser, she runs into Marshall, and a couple of his fans continuing to act friendly without bringing up the livestream. That night, Sam decides to tell the truth to Marshall, but when he goes over to his apartment, she is greeted by his girlfriend instead.
3	"Unity of the Guild"	Akihiko Ota	Ayumi Moriyama	October 16, 2025
4	"Witch, Wizard, Sword Master and The King of Beasts"	Masato Satō	Masato Satō	October 23, 2025
5	"Peel"	Michita Shiraishi	Katsuhito Akiyama	October 30, 2025
6	"ADS -Aim Down Sights-"	Michihiro Satō	Ayumi Moriyama	November 6, 2025
7	"Good Game"	Ayae Shinkai	Ayae Shinkai	November 13, 2025
8	"Unalive"	Marie Watanabe	Noriyoshi Sasaki	November 20, 2025
9	"Replay"	Masato Satō	Masato Satō	November 27, 2025 (Note: This episode aired at 12:55 a.m. JST, 10 minutes after the regular air time on Fuji TV.)
10	"Ruminate Journey"	Mayu Tanimoto	Katsuhito Akiyama	December 4, 2025
11	"Bard"	Kou Nakagawa & Jun Ōwada	Kou Nakagawa	December 11, 2025
12	"Continue"	Daiki Tomiyasu & Ayumi Moriyama	Daiki Tomiyasu	December 18, 2025

== Webcomic's Inspiration ==
Ayres Andrea, from The Comics Beat, interviewed Leeanne M. Krecic, discussing her inspirations for making the story. Krecic has stated that the concept for Let's Play was inspired by her frequent viewing of YouTube content, particularly a video in which a let's player struggled with an amateur fan-made game. Observing the player's frustration led her to consider what might happen if the let's player and the game's creator were to meet, which became the central premise of the comic. Krecic also chose to make the protagonist a female gamer to promote representation, drawing from her own experiences. She began developing the webcomic in Webtoon's Discover section, where she initially published the series, while utilizing Twitter and Tumblr to advertise. Later on, the comic would become an official WebToon release.

== Publications ==
- Krecic, Leeanne M. (October 26, 2021). Let's Play Volume 1. Rocketship Entertainment. ISBN 9781952126116.
- Krecic, Leeanne M. (February 14, 2022). Let's Play Volume 2. Rocketship Entertainment. ISBN 9781952126123.
- Krecic, Leeanne M. (June 13, 2023). Let's Play Volume 3. Rocketship Entertainment. ISBN 9781952126604.
