= UnOrdinary =

Superhero webcomic by Chelsey Han

unOrdinary
- First volume cover, featuring John and Seraphina
- Author: Chelsey Han (uru-chan)
- Website: unOrdinary on WEBTOON
- Current status/schedule: Ongoing
- Launch date: May 24, 2016
- Publisher: Webtoon
- Genres: Superhero; Sci-fi
- Rating: 9.73 Stars on Webtoon as of August 2024

unOrdinary is an American manga-inspired superhero webcomic written and illustrated by the Acton, Massachusetts-based artist Chelsey Han, better known as "uru-chan" (written only with lowercase letters). It was serialized on Tapas from November 2015 until January 2016; it has been published weekly on the platform Webtoon since May 2016, with its chapters collected into four volumes as of November 2025. The story follows a powerless high school student named John Doe navigating a world full of superpowered people. The narrative focuses on how a society built on raw strength affects those at the bottom of the hierarchy, and the brutality of the institutions used to enforce it.

At the Ringo Awards, unOrdinary has won three awards for Fan Favorite Villain category in 2017, 2018, and 2020. It also received one nomination for Best Webcomic category in 2017.

== Plot and themes ==
Set primarily in Wellston Private High School, it features John as a second-year transfer student enrolled in a school full of students with superhuman abilities, despite having no abilities whatsoever, thus labelled as a 'cripple'. There, he meets Seraphina, a 'god-tier' student, also known as Wellston's Ace, who can manipulate time. Despite being at extreme ends of the hierarchy, Seraphina and John strike a close friendship.

unOrdinary deals with themes focusing on coming of age and high school drama. It also has themes of bullying, abuse of power, and mental trauma.

== Awards and nominations ==
Year	Award	Category	Nominee	Result	Ref
2017	Ringo Awards	Fan Favorite Villain	Arlo, from unOrdinary	Won	
2017	Ringo Awards	Best Webcomic	unOrdinary	Nominated	
2018	Ringo Awards	Fan Favorite Villain	Arlo, from unOrdinary	Won	
2020	Ringo Awards	Fan Favorite Villain	John, from unOrdinary	Won	
