= Lore Olympus =

Romance webcomic by Rachel Smythe

- Banner art on Webtoon
- Author: Rachel Smythe
- Current status/schedule: Completed
- Launch date: 2017 (Tumblr, WEBTOON Discover); March 4, 2018 (WEBTOON Canvas)
- End date: June 2, 2024
- Syndicate: WEBTOON
- Publisher: Del Rey Books
- Genre: Romance
- Rating: 9.59 Stars on Webtoon as of May 2024

Lore Olympus is a romance webcomic created by New Zealand artist Rachel Smythe. The comic is a modern retelling of the relationship between the Greek goddess and god Persephone and Hades. Originally published to Smythe's Tumblr in 2017, she began publishing it weekly on the platform Webtoon Discover in April 2017, relaunching it on Webtoon Canvas in March 2018, where the series concluded in June 2024 after three seasons, and 280 episodes. From 2021 to 2026, the series was collected across 11 print volumes by Del Ray Books. The comic has won two Eisner Awards, two Harvey Awards, and two Ringo Awards. It was announced in 2019 that a television adaptation was under development and will be released on Amazon Prime Video.

== Plot and themes ==
Lore Olympus is an adaptation of the classic Greek myth The Abduction of Persephone in a mostly modern setting. The comic deals with themes of rape, harassment, abuse, and trauma.

== Characters ==
The following characters are central to plot lines in the comic and make regular appearances:

- Persephone is the goddess of Spring, Queen of the Underworld, and wife of Hades; she is depicted as a young pink woman, and, briefly in later chapters, has green hands. She is a naive, warmhearted newcomer to the Olympian life, and is searching for her independence. Persephone is 19–20 years old (she turned 20 in episode 107, and, later, 30 in episode 192). She has prehensile hair which responds to her emotions at varying levels, sometimes by growing or sprouting flowers. She strives to become self-sufficient and to maintain a positive, hard-working attitude. While a kind, caring, and somewhat naive individual, Persephone also unintentionally massacred a mortal village for unknowingly uprooting her handmaidens, the sacred flower nymphs.
- Hades is the King of the Underworld, god of the dead and wealth, and husband of Persephone. He is the older brother of Zeus and Poseidon, depicted as a tall, muscular blue businessman with a lot of scars around his body and white hair. Hades is the CEO of Underworld Corp, a large corporation that manages the souls of the dead. The reviewer for Love in Panels! described Hades as "the ultimate sensitive emo guy." Unlike in traditional mythology, Hades is not related to Persephone; Smythe changed this to avoid a story about incest.
- Hera is the goddess of marriage and family, Queen of the gods, and Zeus' wife, depicted as a golden woman with long hair and a long scar across her stomach. She is constantly seen drinking or smoking and is unhappy in her marriage to Zeus. She and Hades originally had a close relationship with each other, before Zeus sent Hades to the Underworld to be the King and proposed to Hera to be both his wife and the Queen of the gods. Due to Zeus' numerous affairs, which motivated Hera to get back at him, she and Hades had an ongoing, passionate sexual affair that lasted centuries, until they ended it in the 80s. Despite this, Hades and Hera continued to be close friends who only have a platonic love for one another. Hera in Lore Olympus is a feminist.
- Eros is the god of love, son of Aphrodite and Ares, and grandson of Zeus and Hera. He is a friend of Persephone and is one of the few gods who is aware of Persephone's rape. He is depicted as a tall, muscular magenta man who enthusiastically creates and supports relationships. Eros has seven younger siblings from his mother and is in a relationship with Psyche.
- Hecate is the goddess of witchcraft. She is presented as a blue woman with yellow eyes and short black hair. She is Hades' right-hand woman. She is smart, sassy, materialistic, and loves chaos.
- Zeus is the King of the gods and Hades' and Poseidon's youngest brother, depicted as a muscular purple businessman with long straight hair. Zeus is an adulterer who shows constant promiscuous behavior. He is stubborn, selfish, narcissistic, egotistical, paranoid, a compulsive liar, and a bully. He is shown to overreact when things do not go his way; for example, he burns down Demeter's crops after she refuses to continue hiding his lovers from Hera. However, despite his negative qualities, he still deeply cares for and loves his wife and both of his brothers. Zeus is a member of the Six Traitors Dynasty and the only one without a scar on his body.
- Apollo is the god of the sun, music, and prophecy, depicted as a dark purple, burly playboy who is interested in Persephone. He is shown to be very arrogant. He rapes her and believes that they are in a relationship and then tries to force her to become his wife, but she refuses. He is Artemis' twin brother. It is later revealed that he is one of Zeus' sons. It is implied that he wants to be with Persephone, not because he genuinely likes her, but because she is a fertility goddess that he can use to overthrow Zeus.
- Artemis is the goddess of the hunt and a member of The Goddesses of Eternal Maidenhood. She is Persephone's best friend, roommate, and the twin sister of Apollo. Artemis is depicted as a feisty, dark purple tomboy who looks out for Persephone and is generally ignorant of her brother's bad personality traits. However, she begins to question her brother after Persephone tells her that she hates Apollo and he makes her miserable.
- Demeter is the goddess of the harvest and agriculture in the Mortal Realm. She is depicted as a tall, green woman with long purple hair and scars across her back. Demeter is shown to be an overbearing, overprotective, controlling, and emotionally abusive mother towards Persephone. She is shown in flashbacks to give her daughter very little freedom in the mortal realm, and as a result of her parenting, Persephone has occasional nightmares.
- Ares is the god of war, depicted as a muscular orange man with red eyes. He is a son of Zeus and Hera and the older brother of Hebe, and brother to Hephaestus. He dated Aphrodite for centuries, but she eventually broke up with him and married Hephaestus. The two are the parents of both Eros and Storge. He also had a brief history with Persephone when they first met in the mortal realm, after being impaled on a tree trunk and Persephone both freed and unknowingly, healed him. Thus, making him suspect she was potentially a fertility goddess.
- Poseidon is the King and god of the sea as well as the younger brother of Hades and the older brother of Zeus. He is the brother-in-law of Persephone, Hera, and Thetis. He is shown to be a carefree, free-spirited, impulsive, muscular green man with long curly hair and a long scar across his left eye. He was also eaten by his father, Cronos and was saved by his brother Zeus. Despite his dimwitted demeanor, he has his moments of wisdom. Poseidon also has a deep love and respect for both of his brothers. He is a member of the Six Traitors Dynasty. He and his wife, Amphitrite, are happily in a polyamorous relationship.
- Amphitrite is both the goddess and Queen of the sea; she is also the wife of Poseidon. She is a green sea nymph, with patterns around her face and has a long fishtail. She appears to have an active social life, going to nightclubs and engaging in queen-related activities with her close friend Hera. She and Poseidon are happily in a polyamorous relationship. Amphitrite is one of Thetis' sisters and the cousin of Leuce.
- Hermes is the god of speed and travel, depicted as a muscular red athlete. He was friends with Persephone before she came to Olympus and frequently hangs out at Artemis and Persephone's house. He is one of Hades' soul collectors at Underworld Corp. He loves three things, money, his Mother, Maia, and annoying Apollo.
- Aphrodite is the goddess of love and beauty and mother of Eros. She is depicted as a lavender woman. At one point, Zeus blamed his affairs on her, resulting in Hera forbidding both Aphrodite and Eros from using their powers on any of the other gods. Originally Ares and Aphrodite were in an open relationship for centuries; though she eventually breaks up with him, and marries Hephaestus. She loves her children and is protective of them. An example is when Aphrodite seduced Zeus and slept with him in order for Eros to avoid getting a cruel punishment after he committed an act of wrath.
- Psyche is a beautiful human from the Mortal Realm. She was originally a princess from an abusive household and was to be wed to an elderly, wealthy merchant before Eros abducted her. She currently lives in Olympus, originally disguised as a purple nymph who served Aphrodite.
- Hestia is the goddess of hearth and home. She is depicted as a curvy orange woman with long hair and a long scar on her left thigh. She is a member of the six traitors dynasty and is the founder of TGOEM, The Goddesses of Eternal Maidenhood which is a group designed for Goddesses to be virgins for all eternity.
- Athena is the goddess of wisdom and warfare. She is depicted as a silver woman with short silver hair.
- Minthe is a scarlet red river nymph who previously lived in the Underworld, and is Hades' ex-girlfriend. She is snarky, has a very self-destructive personality and has low self-confidence in herself; part of this was a result of being raised by her neglectful mother growing up. She is depicted as being emotionally and sometimes physically abusive towards Hades.
- Thanatos is the god of death, depicted as a young grey man with light blue eyes; he is also the son of the titan Nyx, brother of Hypnos, and uncle to Morpheus. Thanatos is insecure in his position as one of Hades' soul collectors due to his low productivity.
- Eris is the goddess of discord. She is presented as a bald woman with yellow skin, black wings and a big scar in the centre of her chest. She was the first child of Hera and Zeus but they disowned her. She gifted Persephone wrath when she was an infant.
- Hephaestus is the god of fire and metalworking. He is a son of Zeus and Hera, and brother of Ares and Hebe. He is depicted as a dark orange man with yellow eyes, a buzzcut, glasses, prosthetic legs and a robotic left arm. He is shown to be a computer hacker and inventor. He has an intelligent AI named Aetna. He is aware of what Apollo did to Persephone, as his mother, Hera, requested that he hack into Apollo's smartphone and delete photos that were taken during the rape.
- Thetis is a grey and turquoise sea nymph. She is a manipulative woman and is Minthe's former toxic best friend. She originally was Zeus' personal secretary and one of his mistresses. She wanted him to leave Hera for her.
- Daphne is a pink and blue flower nymph. Daphne is a friend of Persephone's from the mortal realm. She previously dated Apollo, but after an uncomfortable date together, she ditches him and eventually enters a relationship with Thanatos. She is Echo's roommate and friend.
- Leto is a titan and the goddess of motherhood. She is depicted as a yellow figure with black sclera who wears long veil that hides her mouth. She is the mother of the twins—Artemis and Apollo. She was once best friends with Hera, but after her affair with Zeus was revealed, their friendship was destroyed, and she was socially exiled from Olympus.
- Kronos is the titan of time. He is depicted as a colossal man with skin that looks like the night sky. He was a tyrannical leader and when Hades was six years old he swallowed his son and kept him imprisoned for thirteen years.
- Metis is the titan of wisdom. She is depicted as a giant orange woman with wings. She was a fertility goddess and because of her incredible abilities, she was consumed by Zeus so he could overthrow Kronos. She is the mother of Hera, Hestia and Demeter. She reveals to both Persephone and Hades that she turned herself into a star, as she was about to be consumed by Zeus. She also had an intimate relationship with him.
- Nyx is the primordial goddess of the night. She is depicted as a giant dark blue woman with multiple hot pink eyes. She is the mother of both Thanatos and Hypnos and grandmother of Morpheus.
- Chiron is an orange centaur who wears glasses. She is Persephone's therapist. Chiron is depicted as a female in Lore Olympus rather than a male as in the original myths.
- Rhea is the titan of motherhood and serenity. She is presented as a giant magenta woman. She was the mother of Hades, Poseidon and Zeus. She was a fertility goddess and because of her abilities, she was used by Kronos so he could overthrow Ouranos.
- Leuce is a pink nymph. She was presented as a peace offering, by Zeus to Hades, during negotiations as an alternative bride for Persephone. Hades angrily refused in response. She is a cousin to Amphitrite, Thetis, and their other sisters.
- Morpheus is the goddess of dreams. She is depicted as a blue woman with black hair and wings on her head. She's the daughter of Hypnos, niece to Thanatos, and granddaughter of Nyx. She is transgender.
- Hypnos is the god of sleep. He is Thanatos' twin brother, father to Morpheus, and son of Nyx. He is presented as a nude grey man with blue eyes and wings, similar to Thanatos' look.
- Cerberus is one of Hades' dogs. He is a giant, black greyhound who has the ability to change from being a normal-sized dog to a giant-sized dog with three heads. He is close to Persephone and is able to verbally communicate with Hades.
- Hebe is the goddess of youth. She is the youngest daughter of Zeus and Hera. She also has the ability to concoct numerous types of alcoholic beverages. She is presented as being in the spitting image of her mother.
- Helios is the titan of the sun. He is presented as a giant golden man. He told Thanatos about Persephone's wrathful event.
- Asclepius is a demigod and son of Apollo. He is the god of medicine and works as a physician. Asclepius is presented as a light purple, bald man. He is known to confide others' private matters to his father, most likely as a result of Apollo forcing him to do so; for example, telling Apollo about Hades's sterility. He is clearly intimidated by his father.
- Gaia is the primordial goddess of the earth. Gaia is presented as a giant turquoise woman with hair that looks like leaves. She was the first fertility goddess.
- Ouranos is the primordial god of the sky. He is presented as a giant, muscular sky-blue man, who has six eyes. It is later revealed that Apollo is plotting with him to overthrow Zeus.
- Dionysus is an infant god, born out of the leg of his father Zeus. He was conceived in Zeus' long-running affair with the mortal woman Semele. Zeus has Asclepius stitch an unborn Dionysus into his leg after Semele's death, and because his whole body is immortal, he believed he would be able to keep Dionysus alive until his birth. Persephone is ordered by Zeus to help him deliver the infant god at her apartment complex, as well as not tell Hera about this, since he's trying to make his marriage with her work. Dionysus has purple skin and white hair, a trait Zeus says runs in the family and is most likely connected to Ouranos.

The characters in Lore Olympus are each defined by a particular color. According to columnist Nahlia Bonfiglo, "Hades is depicted in dark colors—blues, purples, and blacks—that match his setting. The underworld is likewise illustrated in dark hues, making Persephone and all of her bold, bright colors pop even more."

== Development history ==
Lore Olympus is written and illustrated by New Zealander Rachel Smythe. Smythe graduated with a graphic design degree, sought to enter the creative industry without success, and went into marketing. Smythe learned about the Webtoon app in 2016, shortly after which she began publishing The Doctor Foxglove Show—a sequel to her former attempt at a long-form series, The Doctor Pepper Show—until it was discontinued after two chapters, the last of which was posted to the Webtoon Discovery section (now called 'Canvas') on June 12, 2016. Roughly a year later, in April 2017, she began drawing Lore Olympus, which began on Tumblr, as well as WEBTOON Discover, before being relaunched on WEBTOON Canvas in March 2018.

On her website for Lore Olympus, Smythe lists some of the sources that she uses for the comic:

- Heroes, Gods and Monsters of the Greek Myths by Bernard Evslin;
- Classical Mythology: The Greeks: The Modern Scholar by Professor Peter Meineck;
- Classical Mythology by Professor Elizabeth Vandiver;
- The Metamorphoses by Ovid;
- The Greek Myths by Robert Graves;
- The Works and Days by Hesiod;
- The Iliad by Homer;
- The Odyssey by Homer;
- The Homeric Hymns, specifically the Hymn to Demeter.

== Publication history ==
Originally published to Tumblr and Webtoon Discover in 2017, The webcomic updated weekly on Webtoon Canvas on its launch there on March 4, 2018, and readers with the "Webtoon Fast Pass" can access pages earlier. In July 2023, Smythe confirmed that she had an ending in mind for the series, and the series ended June 2, 2024, after three seasons, totalling 280 episodes.

Smythe created Lore Olympus using Adobe Photoshop and a Wacom Cintiq Pro drawing tablet.

=== Collected editions ===
Volume	Chapters	Release date	Notes
1	1-25	November 2, 2021	Del Rey Books
2	26-49	July 5, 2022	
3	50-75	October 11, 2022	
4	76-102	June 6, 2023	
5	103-126	October 3, 2023	
6	127-152	May 7, 2024	
7	153-179	October 1, 2024	
8	180-206	May 6, 2025	
9	207-233	October 7, 2025	
10	234-260	June 2, 2026	
11	261-280	October 6, 2026	

== Reception ==
In 2019, Webtoon announced that Lore Olympus had been viewed over 299 million times, making it the most viewed webcomic on the platform.

In an article for The Daily Dot, columnist Nahila Bonfiglio recommended the webcomic, saying: "There are many reasons to read Lore Olympus, but the simplest is to see Smythe's brilliant take on the myth. Her story is flawlessly enthralling, heartwarming, and painful. The characters confront timeless issues through a modern lens, breaking down the romanticization of rape and abduction with grace and intrigue. Smythe updates the series every Sunday, and new readers will find themselves awaiting that notification with bated breath." Bonfiglio also praised the art, saying: "[Smythe's] captivating way of telling her tale often involves carefully considered colors, panels completely without words and even—sometimes—music."

The Beat declared Lore Olympus to be one of the 100 best comics of the 2010s, describing Smythe's art as "breathtaking" and making good use of the webtoon format, and saying that the modern setting made the story "feel as fresh and urgent as eavesdropping on your (very wealthy, very messy) neighbors."

Critical Darlings reviewer Kaitlin Konecke said that "the drawings allow us to see how Persephone feels. It's a visceral way to tell a story, with graphics allowing us to see inside the mind of Persephone and convey the complicated array of emotions that follow trauma such as sexual assault and rape." Konecke also praised the depiction of assault from a female writer, saying that Smythe and others "are not just telling us, but showing us. And in doing so, they make women and survivors feel seen."

A reviewer for Love in Panels! praised the decision to give Persephone more agency than in the original story, saying that "it's that agency, her claiming of her own body and sexuality, that pulls me like a magnet to these tales." Nicole Mejias of Crunchyroll said that while the story is a "bit mature and dramatic," the suspense and romance between Hades and Persephone is gripping, while the "art is colorful and gorgeous."

== Awards and nominations ==
Year	Category	Institution	Result	Ref.
2023	Best Webcomic	Eisner Awards	Won	
2022	Best Webcomic	Eisner Awards	Won	
2022	Best Graphic Story or Comic	Hugo Awards	Nominated	
2021	Best Graphic Novels & Comics	Goodreads Choice Awards	Won	
2021	Digital Book of the Year	Harvey Awards	Won	
2020	Best Webcomic	Ringo Awards	Nominated	
2019	Best Webcomic	Eisner Awards	Nominated	
2019	Best Colorist	Ringo Awards	Nominated	

== Animated adaptation ==
In October 2019, Deadline reported that the Jim Henson Company had entered into a partnership with Webtoon to create an animated series based on Lore Olympus. The series was said to be shepherded by the executive director of television for Jim Henson Company, Ashley Griffis, its style was not yet determined, and nor was its platform announced. Other reports stated that the series would be aimed at young adults and expand the "unique perspective" of Smythe on Greek mythology in the comic. It was also unclear whether Smythe would be involved in the adaptation.

In March 2021, it was claimed that the series would be the "first [Western] animated series based on a Webtoon comic", after other Webtoons, such as Tower of God and The God of High School, had received anime adaptations. In December 2021, Webtoon stated, in a press release, that the Western animated series was "currently in development". The same was repeated in press releases from Webtoon in July 2022 and October 2022. In a November 29, 2024 interview with Anime News Network, Wattpad WEBTOON Studios president Aron Levitz stated that Webtoon was "working with the Jim Henson Company" on the animated adaptation and that since coloration was important to the storytelling, animation was a "great place" to start. In January 2026, it was announced the animated series has received a series order at Amazon Prime Video with Julia Cooperman serving as showrunner, writer, and executive producer on the series. Cooperman replaced original Writer/EP, Stephanie K. Smith who departed the project in mid-2025 after developing the property for five years.
