= The Remarried Empress (novel) =

South Korean web novel series

- Cover of the web novel volumes

재혼 황후 RR: Jaehon hwanghu MR: Chaehon hwanghu
- Genre: Fantasy; Romance
- Author: Alphatart
- Illustrator: Sumpul
- Publisher: Youngcom
- English publisher: NA: Yen Press
- Webtoon service: Naver Webtoon (South Korea); Line Webtoon (English)
- Original run: October 25, 2019 – present
- Volumes: 11
- Anime television series
- Directed by: Tetsuya Yanagisawa
- Written by: Akiko Inoue
- Music by: Yuki Fukazawa
- Studio: Troyca
- Licensed by: Crunchyroll
- Original run: 2027 – scheduled
- Live-action television series
- The Remarried Empress (2026)

The Remarried Empress (Korean: 재혼 황후) is a South Korean web novel series written by Alphatart. It was serialized on Naver Corporation's web novel platform Naver Web Novel from November 2018 to March 2020, with its individual chapters collected into eight volumes.

A manhwa adaptation, which was released as a webtoon, began serialization on Naver Corporation's webtoon platform Naver Webtoon in October 2019. As of August 2026, its individual chapters have been collected into eleven volumes. A live-action television series adaptation, titled The Remarried Empress, is set to be released in November 2026. An anime television series adaptation produced by Troyca is set to premiere in 2027.

== Plot ==
The story follows the life of Navier Ellie Trovi, the empress of the Eastern Empire, and the wife of emperor Sovieshu, whom she has known since childhood. Navier is unable to conceive children, so to get an heir to the throne, Sovieshu brings a concubine named Rashta to bear a child. However, the emperor seems to fall increasingly in love with Rashta and neglects Navier; he eventually files for divorce, though he claims it will only be temporary. Navier finds a confidant and friend in the young prince Heinrey of the Western Empire, and they begin to develop feelings for each other. On the day of the divorce proceedings, Navier agrees, but only on one condition: that she be allowed to marry Heinrey.

== Characters ==
Navier
Voiced by: Yoko Hikasa
Heinrey
Voiced by: Ryōhei Kimura
Sovieshu
Voiced by: Tomoaki Maeno
Rashta
Voiced by: Reina Ueda

== Media ==
=== Web novel ===
Written by Alphatart, the novel was serialized on Naver Corporation's web novel platform Naver Web Novel from November 2, 2018, to March 31, 2020. Its individual chapters were collected into eight volumes. The web novel is published in English digitally by Yonder.

=== Manhwa ===
A manhwa adaptation, released as a webtoon, began serialization on Naver Corporation's webtoon platform Naver Webtoon on October 25, 2019. As of August 2026, the series' individual chapters have been collected into eleven volumes.

The manhwa is published in English digitally by Line Webtoon. At Anime Expo 2022, Yen Press announced that they licensed the manhwa for English publication in print.

=== Live-action TV series ===
A live-action television series adaptation was announced in April 2025. It is produced by Studio N, directed by Jo Soo-won, written by Yeo Ji-na and Hyun Choong-yeol, and starring Shin Min-a, Ju Ji-hoon, Lee Jong-suk, and Lee Se-young. The series premiere on Disney+ and Hulu on November 3, 2026, a day earlier to its original date.

=== Anime ===
An anime television series adaptation was announced during Crunchyroll's panel at New York Comic Con 2026. The series will be produced by Troyca with Hayate Inc. handling general production and directed by Tetsuya Yanagisawa, with Akiko Inoue handling series composition and screenplays, Jun Nakai designing the characters, and Yuki Fukazawa composing the music. It is set to premiere in 2027. Crunchyroll will stream the series.

== Reception ==
The series is one of the most popular web novels in Asia, garnering 70 million views and 4 billion won in sales.

Rebecca Silverman of Anime News Network liked the characters, especially the main character Navier. She also felt the artwork of the webtoon was beautiful. However, she felt the story was too melodramatic at times and that some of the comedic moments were out of place. Silverman concluded by recommending it to fans of Villains Are Destined to Die or Why Raeliana Ended Up at the Duke's Mansion.
