= Return of the Blossoming Blade =

South Korean web novel series

- First webtoon adaptation volume cover, featuring Cheongmyeong
- Author: Biga
- Country: South Korea
- Language: Korean
- Genre: martial arts
- Publisher: Luff (Korean); Webnovel (English)
- Published: April 25, 2019 – present
- Media type: web novel

Return of the Blossoming Blade

화산귀환 RR: Hwasan gwihwan MR: Hwasan kwihwan
- Author: Biga
- Publisher: Studio Lico
- Webtoon service: Naver Webtoon (Korean); Line Webtoon (English)
- Original run: March 23, 2021 – present
- Volumes: 7

Return of the Blossoming Blade (Korean: 화산귀환) is a South Korean web novel written by Biga. It was serialized in Webtoon's digital comic and fiction platform Naver beginning on April 25, 2019.

A webtoon adaptation of Return of the Blossoming Blade was first serialized in Webtoon on March 23, 2021, with the first season ended on August 16, 2022, followed by its second season, which was released on June 23, 2023. Return of the Blossoming Blade received official English translations by Line Webtoon beginning in June 2021. Its individual chapters have been collected and published in five volumes by Studio Lico, as of December 2024.

An aeni television series adaptation has been discussed. An original soundtrack can be found on Studio Lico’s YouTube channel as well as other short-form animations.

A crossover role-playing video game titled Seven Knights Idle Adventure has been released as an update by Netmarble.

== Characters ==
- Cheongmyeong – the carefree protagonist of Return of the Blossoming Blade. He was a master martial artist known as the Plum Blossom Sword Saint, one of the greatest swordsmen over 100 years ago. After dying in a battle against the Cheonma of the Demonic Cult, he is reincarnated a century later as a 15-year-old boy. Upon seeing the Mount Hua Sect falling into despair, he sets out to restore it to its former glory, training a new generation of disciples.
- Yunjong – the third-class disciple of the Mount Hua Sect and the eldest of the Cheong generation. As the oldest third-class disciple, he is respected as a leader and caretaker of the younger members. Despite his calm nature, Yunjong strives to improve and become stronger, inspired by Cheongmyeong's swordsmanship.
- Jo Gul – the shy, yet loyal third-class disciple of the Mount Hua Sect and second son of a merchant family. He is skilled in martial arts, comparable to Lee Songbaek in talent.
- Yoo Iseol – Known as the Ice Sword Plum Blossom, Iseol is the a second-class disciple of the Mount Hua Sect. Despite her cold and expressionless demeanor, she is focused on mastering the Plum Blossom Sword Technique, following her father's legacy.
- Baek Cheon – A stern second-grade disciple of the Mount Hua Sect and leader of the Baek generation. Initially content with his status, Baek Cheon later realizes his limitations and wants to surpass his older brother in martial arts.

== Media ==
=== Web novel ===
Return of the Blossoming Blade was first serialized in Naver's digital comic and fiction platform Webtoon since April 25, 2019. The novel was licensed in English by Webnovel under the title Return of the Mount Hua Sect.

=== Webtoon ===
A webtoon adaptation launched in Webtoon on March 23, 2021, and ended its run on August 16, 2022. The second season began on June 23, 2023, with its first collected volume being previously released by Studio Lico the same year on January 18. The webtoon has been published Line Webtoon in English.

==== Volumes ====
No.	Korean release date	Korean ISBN
01	January 18, 2023	979-11-69630-43-6
02	January 18, 2023	979-11-69630-44-3
03	May 10, 2023	979-11-69631-40-2
04	August 29, 2023	979-11-69632-76-8
05	February 22, 2024	979-11-69635-58-5
06	December 4, 2024	979-11-73042-12-6
07	December 4, 2024	979-11-73042-12-6

=== Aeni ===
An aeni television series adaptation has been announced.

=== Game ===
In March 2024, Netmarble announced that they were updating Seven Knights Idle Adventure, a role-playing video game. The game was released on September 6, 2023.

== Reception ==
The webtoon won the Presidential Award in the cartoon category at the 2022 Korea Contents Awards, and was praised as a monumental work arts.
