= Teenage Mercenary =

South Korean webtoon

입학용병 RR: Iphagyongbyeong MR: Iphagyongbyŏng
- Genre: Action; Suspense
- Author: YC
- Illustrator: Rakyeon
- Webtoon service: Naver Webtoon (Korean); Line Webtoon (English)
- Original run: November 7, 2020 – present
- Anime television series
- Directed by: Manabu Ono
- Written by: Manabu Ono
- Music by: Hiroyuki Sawano
- Studio: J.C.Staff
- Licensed by: Crunchyroll
- Original run: 2027 – scheduled

Teenage Mercenary (Korean: 입학용병; RR: Iphak yongbyeong, Japanese: 入学傭兵, romanized: Nyūgaku Yōhei) is a South Korean manhwa released as a webtoon written by YC and illustrated by Rakyeon. It has been serialized on Naver Corporation's webtoon platform Naver Webtoon since November 2020. An anime television series adaptation produced by J.C.Staff is set to premiere in 2027.

== Plot ==
After surviving a plane crash and suffering from amnesia, child Ijin Yu is forced to become a mercenary to survive in a war zone. After ten years, his memory returns, and he decides to return to Korea to live an ordinary life and enroll in high school with his sister. However, Ijin finds out that even this life has its own forms of violence, like bullying and other forms of injustice. Ijin decides to use the skills he gained as a mercenary to confront these challenges.

== Media ==
=== Manhwa ===
Written by YC and illustrated by Rakyeon, Teenage Mercenary began serialization on Naver Webtoon on November 7, 2020. Line Webtoon has been publishing the series in English since 2021.

=== Anime ===
An anime television series adaptation was announced on June 19, 2025. The series will be produced by J.C.Staff with Hayate Inc. handling general production and directed and written by Manabu Ono, with Koji Haneda designing the characters and Hiroyuki Sawano composing the music. It is set to premiere in 2027. Crunchyroll will stream the series.

== Reception ==
On Line Manga in Japan, Teenage Mercenary was the most popular title in 2023 and 2024. In 2023, it generated ¥100 million in revenue, the most of any title that year.
