= The Remarried Empress =

2026 South Korean television series

- Promotional poster
- Hangul: 재혼 황후
- RR: Jaehon hwanghu
- MR: Chaehon hwanghu
- Genre: Romantic fantasy
- Based on: The Remarried Empress by: Alphatart; Sumpul; HereLee
- Written by: Yeoh Geena; Hyun Choong-yeol
- Directed by: Cho Su-won; Kim Chang-ju
- Starring: Shin Min-a; Ju Ji-hoon; Lee Jong-suk; Lee Se-young
- Music by: Kim Tae-seung
- Country of origin: South Korea
- Original language: Korean
- No. of episodes: 8

Production
- Executive producers: Jung Yun-jae; Lee Sang-jik; Kim Nam-su
- Producers: Michelle Kwon; Lee Ji-sun
- Production locations: Czech Republic; Germany; South Korea
- Cinematography: Baek Yun-seok; Kwon Byung-su; Jung Jong-bum
- Editor: Kim Chang-ju
- Running time: 48–59 minutes
- Production companies: Studio N; Beyond Story

Original release
- Network: Disney+ (Hulu content hub)
- Release: November 3, 2026 – present

The Remarried Empress (Korean: 재혼 황후) is an ongoing South Korean romantic fantasy television series written by Yeoh Geena and Hyun Choong-yeol, directed by Cho Su-won and Kim Chang-ju, and starring Shin Min-a, Ju Ji-hoon, Lee Jong-suk, and Lee Se-young. Based on the web novel of the same name by Alphatart, Sumpul, and HereLee, the series depicts Empress Navier, who is divorced by Emperor Sovieshu and remarries Prince Heinrey of the Western Kingdom.

Produced by Studio N and Beyond Story, principal photography took place across the Czech Republic, Germany, and South Korea between June and November 2025. The series held preview screenings at the 31st Busan International Film Festival on October 9, 2026, before premiering globally on Disney+ and Hulu on November 3.

== Synopsis ==
Empress Navier is taken aback by her husband's cruel demand for a divorce so he can wed his mistress (described in the Disney+ synopsis as a runaway slave), but she does not give up easily. Instead, she takes a risk and joins forces with an enigmatic Prince Heinrey from the Western Kingdom in an unlikely alliance. Navier will go to any lengths to regain her throne and outdo her ex-husband at every opportunity as she navigates the competitive realm of palace politics and romance.

== Cast and characters ==
=== Main ===
- Shin Min-a as Navier

An intelligent and elegant Empress of the Eastern Empire, maintained a peaceful but loveless marriage with Emperor Sovieshu, her childhood friend.

- Ju Ji-hoon as Sovieshu

Empress Navier's ex-husband, who divorced her to marry Rashta, a former slave.

- Lee Jong-suk as Heinrey

A prince of the Western Kingdom, who can secretly transform into a bird, spies on the Eastern Empire's palace. While in his bird form, he encounters and falls in love with Empress Navier.

- Lee Se-young as Rashta

A runaway slave. She is Emperor Sovieshu's mistress and becomes his second wife and empress after he divorces Navier.

=== Supporting ===
- Lee Bong-ryun as Eliza

Navier's head lady-in-waiting.

- Choi Dae-hoon as McKenna

Heinrey's secretary.

- Park Ho-san as Viscount Lotteshu

Rashta's former owner.

- Jung Young-joo as Albani
- Nam Yun-ho as Baron Lante

Sovieshu's secretary.

- Ha Do-kwon as Kosair

Navier's brother.

- Kim Bo-yoon as Lady Laura

Navier's lady-in-waiting.

- Kim Taek as Artina
- Ahn Tae-hwan as Cherle

Albani‘s son.

- Lee Ki-taek as Falhan
- Han Sung-min as Princess Soz
- Cha Woo-min as Duke Kauffman

The Grand Duke of Rwabt.

- Cha Joo-wan as The royal messenger
- Hong Si-young as Allen

Lotteshu's son.

=== Special appearances ===
- Uhm Ji-won as Sovieshu’s mother
- Lee Joon-hyuk as King Wotton III
- Kang Han-na as Christa

== Production ==
=== Development ===
The series, which based on the web novel of the same name by Alphatart, was officially commissioned by Disney+. Cho Su-won served as director, who helmed Pinocchio (2014), and the script is penned by Yeoh Geena and Hyun Choong-yeol, who wrote The Uncanny Counter (2020), while Studio N and Beyond Story managed the production.

In November 2025, it was reported that director Shim Na-yeon, known for Beyond Evil (2021) and The Good Bad Mother (2023), joined the production as a co-director alongside Cho during the latter stage of filming.

A script reading took place on May 13, 2025.

=== Casting ===
In 2024, Lee Jong-suk and Shin Min-a were reportedly considering.

In April 2025, the casting of Shin Min-a, Ju Ji-hoon, Lee Jong-suk, and Lee Se-young as the leads was officially confirmed. In June, a script reading revealed that actors Lee Bong-ryun, Choi Dae-hoon, Park Ho-san, Jung Young-joo, and Nam Yoon-ho had joined the cast. Lee Joon-hyuk and Kang Han-na reportedly joined the cast in November.

=== Filming ===
Principal photography began in Prague on June 15, a month later than the initial plan of May 2025, and concluded in November. Production locations included Schleissheim Palace outside Munich, Germany, which served as the imperial palace of the Eastern Empire. Additional filming took place across the Czech Republic, including Kutná Hora, Hrádek u Nechanic, Castle Jaroměřice nad Rokytnou, Castle Tochovice, Švihov Castle, Červená Lhota Castle, Kroměříž Gardens, and places in Brno.

== Release ==
In August 2026, BIFF announced The Remarried Empress was selected as one of three drama series in the On Screen section of the 31st edition, where three of its 10 episodes would be screened on October 9, 10, and 12. Following sold-out preview screenings at the 31st Busan International Film Festival in October 2026 and a trailer that generated over 13 million views in its first 48 hours, the series was released globally on Disney+ and Hulu, a day earlier to its original premiere date. Two new episodes will release every Wednesday beginning November 11, leading up to the series finale on November 25.
