= My Giant Nerd Boyfriend =

Webcomic

- Cover Art
- Author: Fishball
- Website: WEBTOON
- Current status/schedule: Updates every Monday, Wednesday, and Friday
- Launch date: March 6, 2017
- Publisher: WEBTOON
- Genre: Slice of Life
- Rating: 9.73 Stars on WEBTOON

My Giant Nerd Boyfriend (later My Giant Nerd Boyfriend^{*now Husband}) is an autobiographical comic by Malaysian artist Fishball (born June 1990), following Fishball, her tall, nerdy husband (referred to as "Micky" by his friends and family and "Boyfriend" by fans), and their Pomeranian dog, Biscuit. Since the couple got married, the title at the start of the current chapters includes "*now Husband".

The comic has been the fourth-most popular work from the publisher Webtoon, with 158 million views in 2019, and was nominated for a Ringo Award for Best Humor Comic.

== Premise ==
My Giant Nerd Boyfriend is an autobiographical comic about its creator, Fishball, her tall nerdy husband, and their pet dog, Biscuit. A slice-of-life one-shot humor comic, it includes strips based on the couple's relationship, her husband's nerdy activities, the effects of their different height, and life in Malaysia. One review described the boyfriend as "patient, devoted, and puts up with her nuttiness with the personality of a shaggy dog."

== Notable arcs and milestones ==
In May 2021, Fishball released a three-chapter arc titled "Dear Father", detailing the events of her father's death from complications related to COVID-19.

In May 2022, chapters 724–727 were released (named "Pro", "Po", "Sal", and "Proposal (afterword)" respectively) over the course of the week to announce the couple's engagement. The comic then changed its title to "My Giant Nerd Boyfriend (*now Fiancé*)".

In November 2023, chapters 910–913 were released as a four-chapter arc titled "Planning", detailing the couple's wedding ceremony in Queenstown, New Zealand at one of the iconic filming scenes for The Lord of the Rings film trilogy. The comic's title was changed thereafter to "My Giant Nerd Boyfriend (*now Husband*)".

In July 2024, chapters 995–1000 were released under the names "5", "4", "3", "2", "1", and "Zero", commemorating the comic reaching a thousand updates.

== Publication and adaptation ==
My Giant Nerd Boyfriend is created by Fishball, who is from Malaysia and was 27 years old during 2017. The comic is published on Webtoon and began publication in March 2017. As of July 2024, it publishes three times a week and has 1000 strips. As of 2018, the comic was edited by Bekah Caden.

The comic was adapted into a short animated series which was published on YouTube in July 2019. There are ten episodes, each four minutes or less.

== Reception ==
Webtoon reported that in 2019, My Giant Nerd Boyfriend was its fourth-most popular comic, with 158 million views in that year. As of August 2021 it has 2.1 million subscribers on Webtoon.

The comic was nominated in 2018 for a Ringo Award for Best Humor Comic.

Writing for The A.V. Club, Oliver Sava called it "a delightful slice-of-life comic" that "delivers addictive, adorable short strips". Brittany Wong wrote in HuffPost that the comic was "for couples who are basically just two grown kids in love".
