= I Love Yoo =

American webtoon series

- Author: Quimchee
- Website: I Love Yoo on WEBTOON
- Current status/schedule: Ongoing
- Publisher: Webtoon
- Genre(s): Romance, Drama, Psychological
- Original language: English

I Love Yoo is an American webtoon series written and illustrated by Quimchee. Set in South Korea, it began serialization on WEBTOON (Naver Webtoon) in July 2017. Initially advertised as a romance, the series has evolved into a drama and psychological thriller, exploring themes of family, social class, and abuse.

== Synopsis ==
The story follows Shin-Ae Yoo, a high school student with a difficult past who has become jaded by relationships and prefers an unsocial, loveless existence. Her quiet life takes an unexpected turn when she accidentally spills her drink on a stranger. This incident leads her to become entangled with the wealthy and influential Hirahara brothers, Kousuke and Yeong-Gi ("Nol") Hirahara, whose conflicting personalities and complex family dynamics bring both chaos and significant changes to Shin-Ae's life.

As the narrative progresses, what initially appears to be a typical romance webtoon shifts into a broader drama, delving into themes of abuse, classism, trauma, and the intricacies of human relationships. The series is noted for its character development, with protagonists and side characters evolving in complex ways that challenge initial perceptions.

== Characters ==
- Shin-Ae Yoo: The protagonist, a pragmatic and resilient high school student who tries to avoid social interaction and romantic entanglements due to past traumas. Her life changes after meeting the Hirahara brothers.
- Kousuke Hirahara: One of the wealthy Hirahara brothers, often portrayed as stoic and ambitious.
- Yeong-Gi "Nol" Hirahara: The younger Hirahara brother, who's considered the black sheep of the Hirahara family. He is the more laid-back brother.
- Yui Hirahara: The matriarch of the Hirahara family, whose influence heavily impacts the lives of her sons and Shin-Ae.

== Publication ==
I Love Yoo began its serialization as a WEBTOON Original in July 2017, published by Naver Webtoon. The series has released hundreds of episodes and continues to be updated weekly.

A physical graphic novel adaptation, titled I Love Yoo Volume One: A WEBTOON Unscrolled Graphic Novel, is as of November 2025 in the works and set to be published in 2026.

== Reception ==
I Love Yoo is widely recognized as one of WEBTOON's most popular and long-running original series, garnering millions of views and a large global fanbase. Critics have praised its literary and artistic craftsmanship, particularly its compelling and flawed characters, which contribute to the story's engaging and complex nature. The webtoon is noted for its evolution from a pure romance into a broader drama, effectively balancing elements of romance, humor, and drama. It tackles challenging social themes such as bullying and classism, which are intricately woven into the narrative.

== Awards and nominations ==
Awards and nominations for I Love Yoo
Year	Award	Category	Recipient(s)	Result	Ref.
2018	Ringo Awards	Fan Favorite New Series	I Love Yoo	Won	
2023	Ringo Awards	Best Webcomics	I Love Yoo	Nominated	
