= SubZero (webcomic) =

Romance webcomic

- SubZero banner art
- Author: Junepurrr
- Website: https://www.webtoons.com/en/romance/subzero/list?title_no=1468
- Current status/schedule: Updates weekly
- Launch date: October 21, 2018
- Publisher: Webtoon
- Genre: Romance
- Rating: 9.80 stars on Webtoon as of July 2021

SubZero is a fantasy romance webcomic created by artist Junepurrr. It follows the marriage between a princess and prince from rival clans arranged in order to end a war. It began publishing weekly on the Webtoon platform in 2018. According to data from Webtoon, it had received 73 million views by the end of 2019. The comic won a fan Ringo Award in 2020 for Favorite Hero.

== Publication ==
SubZero is created by artist Junepurrr. It began publishing on the Webtoon platform in 2018, and started its second season in June 2021. It is published weekly, though had a hiatus between seasons.

== Plot and themes ==
SubZero is a fantasy romance that follows the marriage of the princess of the ceruleo Clan, Clove, and the rival prince of the Crimson son Clan, Kyro, as they maneuver to end the war that has waged between their clans for centuries. The conflict between the two dragon clans is the backdrop for an "enemies-to-lovers" story between Princess Clove and Prince Kyro. The comic also delves into subplots of political intrigue and explores themes of betrayal, war, forgiveness, duty, and sacrifice.

The plot begins with the ceruleo Dragon Princess Clove accepting the terms of a marriage with the rival clan's prince, Kyro, and effectively surrendering her freedom for the good of her clan. What begins as a begrudging union between the two develops into something more over the course of the series as they learn more about each other and their dedication to stopping the bloodshed between the two dragon clans.

== Major characters ==
The following characters are central to plot lines in the comic and make regular appearances:

- Clove is the princess of the cerúleo Clan and the last remaining person in her bloodline that carries the cerúleo Dragon. She has been sheltered most of life on an icebound and secluded island, and despite her heritage she has never been able to shift into a dragon. Although her upbringing was sheltered, she is portrayed as observant, diligent, commanding, and able to take advantage of the fact that people expect her to be naive. She is ultimately dedicated to ending the war between the two clans and has been shown to sacrifice her own well-being to achieve this goal.
- Kyro is the prince of the Crimson Clan and initial enemy of Clove despite their engagement. He is initially portrayed as a ruthless general, however over time he is revealed to be just as dedicated to ending the war as Clove. He is able to shift into a red dragon, and there have been several instances where he has revealed himself to be a romantic person. Throughout the series he is depicted as having a cold and calculating exterior while harboring noble motives underneath.

== Awards and reception ==
The comic won a fan favorite Ringo Award in 2020 for Favorite Hero.

According to data from Webtoon, SubZero had received 73 million views and was the platform's 13th most popular comic.

A reviewer for The Beat said in 2021 that "despite sometimes feeling pretty frustrated by the story, I am addicted to finding out the ending... Come for the dragons and angst, stay for the art and plot twists."
