= Third Shift Society =

Webcomic and graphic novel by Meredith Moriarty

- Cover of Third Shift Society vol. 1
- Author: Meredith Moriarty
- Illustrator: Meredith Moriarty
- Website: Third Shift Society on WEBTOON
- Current status/schedule: Ongoing
- Syndicate(s): Tapas (2018–2019); WEBTOON (2019–present)
- Publisher: WEBTOON Unscrolled
- Genre: Occult detective

Third Shift Society is a occult detective webcomic/graphic novel series created by Meredith Moriarty, following Ellie McGuinness, an Irish-American woman who learns she has powers of wielding magic psychic flames, who gets a job working for Ichabod Me, a pumpkin-headed paranormal detective.

The series was originally launched on Tapas, ArtStation, and Tumblr in 2018, compared to the Irish fantasy book series Skulduggery Pleasant by Derek Landy, before being republished from September 12, 2019, via WEBTOON; as of April 2025, 65 episodes spanning three seasons have been published, receiving a positive critical reception.

The title was also nominated for an Eisner Award in 2020 for Best Webcomic, while a live-action television series adaptation is in active development.

== Plot ==
The plot of the Third Shift Society follows 20-something Irish-American Ellie McGuinness, who is unable to hold down a job and is desperate for money. On her way home from losing another job, she stumbles across Ichabod Me, a pumpkin-headed paranormal detective battling a skeletal beast. While trying to help Ichabod, Ellie discovers that she has the ability to shoot psychic flames from her hands, and Ichabod offers her a job as his partner. Together the two begin to solve crimes and mysteries involving the supernatural.

== Adaptations ==
Third Shift Society currently has an ongoing graphic novel series adaptation published by Webtoon Unscrolled. A live-action television series adaptation based on the webcomic, headed by Wattpad Webtoon Studios, John W. Hyde and Terissa Kelton's Rehab Entertainment and The Jim Henson Company, was announced to be in development in October 2024.

== Collected editions ==
Volumes 1 and 2 of the Third Shift Society are available in print through WEBTOON Unscrolled.

== Reception ==
The first print volume was positively reviewed by Comic Book Resources, which praised the artwork and lettering.
