= Yumi's Cells: The Movie =

2024 South Korean animated film

- Teaser poster
- Hangul: 유미의 세포들 더 무비
- RR: Yumiui sepodeul deo mubi
- MR: Yumiŭi sep'odŭl tŏ mubi
- Directed by: Kim Da-hee
- Based on: Yumi's Cells by Lee Dong-gun
- Starring: Yoon Ah-young; Shin Beom-sik
- Animation by: Kim Da-hee
- Color process: Color
- Production companies: Studio N; Locus Animation
- Distributed by: Barunson E&A; CJ CGV; Lotte Cultureworks; Lotte Cinema
- Release date: April 3, 2024
- Running time: 93 minutes
- Country: South Korea
- Language: Korean
- Box office: US$443,995

Yumi's Cells: The Movie (Korean: 유미의 세포들 더 무비) is a 2024 South Korean animated comedy drama film directed by Kim Da-hee. Based on the webtoon of the same name by Lee Dong-gun, the film is produced by Locus Animation and Studio N. It follows an office worker Yumi and the myriad of cells inside her brain – such as Rational Cell, Emotional Cell, Anxiety Cell, Love Cell, Naughty Cell, and more – each responsible for Yumi's emotions and actions.

The film was released theatrically on April 3, 2024.

== Voice cast ==
- Yoon Ah-young
- Shin Beom-sik
- Song Ha-rim
- Ahn So-yi
- Sa Moon-young
- Ahn Young-mi
- Park Ji-Yoon
- Sim Gyu-Hyeok

== Production ==
Locus Corporation (previously known as Sidus Animation Studios) announced in June 2020 that they would co-produce an animated feature film based on Yumi's Cells with Studio N.

== Release ==
The film launched its pre-sales in February 2024 at 37th Berlin European Film Market (EFM 2024) held in conjunction with the 2024 Berlin International Film Festival. Barunson E&A acquired sales rights of the film.

CJ CGV, Lotte Cultureworks, and Lotte Cinema were the distributors of the film.

It was released in South Korea theatrically on April 3, 2024.

== Reception ==
=== Box office ===
The film was released on April 3, 2024, on 441 screens.

As of April 28, 2024, the film has grossed US$443,995 from 76,266 admissions.
