= 1 Second =

South Korean webtoon

- Manhwa cover of 1 Second volume 1

1초 RR: 1cho MR: 1ch'o
- Genre: Action, Drama, Supernatural
- Author: Sini
- Illustrator: Kwang Woon
- Webtoon service: Naver Webtoon (Korean); Line Webtoon (English)
- Original run: March 13, 2019 – October 29, 2026
- Volumes: 24
- Anime television series
- Studio: Duruflix
- Original network: EBS1
- Original run: November 24, 2024 – January 5, 2025
- Episodes: 7

1 Second (Korean: 1초) is a South Korean manhwa released as a webtoon written by Sini and illustrated by Kwang Woon. It was serialized via Naver Corporation's webtoon platform, Naver Webtoon, from March 2019 to October 2026, with the individual chapters collected and published into 24 volumes. The manhwa has been published in English by Line Webtoon. A South Korean animated series produced by Durifix, EBS, and Studio N was released. The manhwa received live musical plays in KEPCO Art Center Concert Hall, Seoul, Korea.

A live-action adaptation series produced by Arc Media has been announced and will be released on Disney+.

== Plot ==
1 Second tells the story of Hosu, a rookie firefighter and his journey on how he became a firefighter with 100% rescue rate and a seasoned veteran. He has a secret: the supernatural ability to see glimpses of future under extreme stress. Alongside with his peers, he aims to save everyone while keeping his ability hidden from others.

== Media ==
=== Manhwa ===
Sini and Kwang Woon launched 1 Second in Naver's webtoon platform Naver Webtoon on March 13, 2019, and concluded its first season on August 4, 2022. Its second season began on October 27, 2022, and ended on August 1, 2024. A third season began on October 31, 2024 and concluded the whole series finale on October 29, 2026.

==== Volumes ====
No.	Korean release date	Korean ISBN
1	May 27, 2021	979-1-19-015380-5
프롤로그 | Prologue; 1화 영웅 | Ep.1 Hero; 2화 CPR : 심폐소생술 | Ep.2 CPR: Cardiopulmonary Resuscitation; 3화 입교식 | Ep.3 Entrance Ceremony; 4화 레펠 훈련 (1) | Ep.4 Rappel Training (1); 5화 레펠 훈련 (2) | Ep.5 Rappel Training (2); 6화 레펠 훈련 (3) | Ep.6 Rappel Training (3); 7화 레펠 훈련 (4) | Ep.7 Rappel Training (4); 8화 소방학교 화재진압원 (1) | Ep.8 Fire Academy Backup for Fire (1); 9화 소방학교 화재진압원 (2) | Ep.9 Fire Academy Backup for Fire (2); 10화 소방학교 화재진압원 (3) | Ep.10 Fire Academy Backup for Fire (3); 11화 소방학교 화재진압원 (4) | Ep.11 Fire Academy Backup for Fire (4); 12화 소방학교 화재진압원 (5) | Ep.12 Fire Academy Backup for Fire (5); 13화 소방학교 화재진압원 (6) | Ep.13 Fire Academy Backup for Fire (6)
2	May 27, 2021	979-1-19-015381-2
3	May 27, 2021	979-1-19-015382-9
4	December 16, 2021	979-1-16-779044-6
5	January 26, 2022	979-1-16-779060-6
6	October 26, 2022	979-1-16-779159-7
7	October 26, 2022	979-1-16-779160-3
8	October 26, 2022	979-1-16-779161-0
9	March 30, 2023	979-1-16-779220-4
10	March 30, 2023	979-1-16-779221-1
11	May 31, 2023	979-1-16-779247-1
12	December 26, 2023	979-1-16-779365-2
13	January 31, 2024	979-1-16-779369-0
14	March 27, 2024	979-1-16-779402-4
15	April 29, 2024	979-1-16-779422-2
16	April 29, 2024	979-1-16-779423-9
17	July 17, 2024	979-1-16-779446-8

=== Animation ===
A South Korean animated series produced by Durifix, EBS, and Studio N was released on November 24, 2024 and finished it's run on January 5,2025. Total 7 episodes with each episode having a runtime of 11 minutes.

No.	Title	Original release date
1	Korean: 구하기 위해 / 추락 속의 선택; RR: guhagi wihae / churak sogui seontaek)	November 24, 2024
2	Korean: 소방학교 화재 지원 / 특별해지는 순간; RR: sobanghakgyo hwajae jiwon / teukbyeolhaejineun sungan)	December 1, 2024
3	Korean: 한계 돌파 전문 체력 측정 / 작도소방서 2팀; RR: hangye dolpa jeonmun cheryeok cheukjeong / jakdosobangseo 2tim)	December 8, 2024
4	Korean: 어둠 속의 첫 출동 / 여섯; RR: eodum sogui cheot chuldong / yeoseot)	December 15, 2024
5	Korean: 산업 단지 화재 / 반성; RR: saneop danji hwajae / banseong)	December 22, 2024
6	Korean: 조직이란 / 기적을 향한 질주; RR: jojigiran / gijeogeul hyanghan jilju)	December 29, 2024
7	Korean: 외상 후 스트레스 장애 / 집결; RR: oesang hu seuteureseu jangae / jipgyeol)	January 5, 2025

=== Live Musical ===
The series received live musical show from July 5, 2025 to August 17, 2025 at KEPCO Art Center Concert Hall.

=== Drama ===
A South Korean television series produced by Arc Media has been announced and the show will be released on Disney+.
