= Hayate Inc. =

Japanese production company

- Company logo
- Native name: 株式会社HAYATE
- Romanized name: Kabushiki-gaisha Hayate
- Type: Joint venture
- Industry: Production
- Genre: Japanese animation
- Founded: March 17, 2025; 19 months ago
- Headquarters: 4-5 Rokubanchō, Chiyoda, Tokyo, Japan
- Key people: Masanori Miyake (Chairman and CEO); Leo Watanabe (President and COO)
- Products: Anime; Motion pictures
- Parent: Aniplex; Crunchyroll, LLC
- Subsidiaries: Lay-duce
- Website: hayate-inc.co.jp

Hayate, Inc. (Japanese: 株式会社HAYATE, Hepburn: Kabushiki-gaisha Hayate) is a Japanese anime planning and production joint venture established in March 2025 by Aniplex and Crunchyroll, LLC, both subsidiaries of Sony Music Entertainment Japan. Headquartered in Tokyo, Japan, the company focuses on the planning, development, and production of anime content specifically for global distribution via Crunchyroll streaming service.

== History ==
Prior to the Sony acquisition, Crunchyroll had its own in-house animation studio which it founded in 2018 to produce its own animated originals for its streaming service as well as its VRV streaming service until it was shut down in August 2021 following the Sony acquisition.

On March 17, 2025, Aniplex and Crunchyroll, LLC announced the formation of Hayate, Inc., a joint venture between the two companies to produce "premium content for anime fans worldwide," indicating a focus on high-quality productions with broad appeal.

The leadership of Hayate, Inc. comprises key figures Masanori Miyake as the Chairman and CEO, Leo Watanabe as President and COO, who are both from Aniplex. The company's staff includes employees from both Crunchyroll and Aniplex, fostering a collaborative environment that integrates the distinct expertise of each organization.

The primary objective of Hayate, Inc. is to produce original anime exclusively for Crunchyroll's streaming service. This initiative signifies a deeper investment by both Aniplex and Crunchyroll in creating new anime for the global market and potentially expanding the variety and exclusivity of content offered on the platform.

On April 3, 2026, Hayate announced the acquisition of anime studio Lay-duce as a wholly owned subsidiary.

In October 2026, during the New York Comic Con, Hayate, Crunchyroll, and LINE Digital Frontier announced a co-production partnership primarily focusing on creating anime adaptations for a select Webtoon titles, starting with The Remarried Empress.

== Productions ==
=== TV series ===
- Hana-Kimi (2026)
- A Returner's Magic Should Be Special season 2 (2026)
- Reborn as a Space Mercenary (2026)
- Dengeki Daisy (2027)
- SSS-Class Revival Hunter (2027)
- Teenage Mercenary (2027)
- The Remarried Empress (2027)
- Ghost of Tsushima: Legends (2028)
- The Boxer (TBA)
