= Monica Gallagher (comics artist) =

American comics creator

- Born: Baltimore
- Works: The Black Ghost, Assassin Roommate
- Awards: Ringo Award for Favorite Hero (Assassin Roommate, 2018)
- Website: www.eatyourlipstick.com

Monica Gallagher is an American writer and illustrator. She has worked for several comic publishers, such as Oni Press and DC Comics, among others. She is author of WEBTOON series Assassin Roommate and BOO! It's Sex (the last one written by Danielle Corsetto).

Gallagher is also co-creator (alongside Alex Segura) of comiXology series The Black Ghost, written by her and Segura and drawn by George Kambadais. This series is about Lara Dominguez, a police reporter who is obsessed with getting an exclusive story on the mysterious vigilante Black Ghost.

Gallagher has received Ringo Awards for Fan Favorite Hero for Mags, character of Assassin Roommate.
