= Yumi's Cells (webtoon) =

2015–2020 manhwa by Lee Dong-gun

유미의 세포들 RR: Yumiui sepodeul MR: Yumiŭi sep'odŭl
- Genre: Comedy, Romance
- Author: Lee Dong-gun
- Publisher: Naver
- Original run: April 1, 2015 – November 13, 2020

Yumi's Cells (Korean: 유미의 세포들) is a South Korean manhwa series written and illustrated by Lee Dong-gun. This webtoon was released on internet portal Naver from April 1, 2015, to November 13, 2020, with a total 512 chapters. The story revolves around Kim Yumi, a 32-year-old office worker, and her brain cells, tiny blue-hooded cells that control her every mood, thought, and action.

== Adaptations ==
=== Video games ===
- Yumi's Block Pang
- Yumi's Cells: My Dream House
- Yumi's Cells: The Game

=== Web novel ===
- Yumi's Cells at Naver Series

=== Television series ===
A live-action drama, titled Yumi's Cells, was released on September 17, 2021, in South Korea. On September 8, 2021, TVING announced that the drama had sold broadcast rights in more than 160 countries around the world, including Europe, North America, and Southeast Asia.

=== Film ===
The animated film titled Yumi's Cells: The Movie was released on April 3, 2024, in South Korea.

=== Musical ===
A musical titled Yumi's Cells will premiere in South Korea on June 30, 2026 at the CJ Towol Theatre in the Seoul Arts Centre. Produced by Sam Company and Studio N, it stars Tiffany Young and Kim Ye-won as Yumi, Jung Taek-woon and Jeong Jin-woon as the original 109 Cell, and Kim So-hyang and Yuria as Love Cell.
