= Abscisate beta-glucosyltransferase =

Class of enzymes

Identifiers
- EC no.: 2.4.1.263

Databases
- IntEnz: IntEnz view
- BRENDA: BRENDA entry
- ExPASy: NiceZyme view
- KEGG: KEGG entry
- MetaCyc: metabolic pathway
- PRIAM: profile
- PDB structures: RCSB PDB PDBe PDBsum
Search
- PMC: articles
- PubMed: articles
- NCBI: proteins

Abscisate beta-glucosyltransferase (EC 2.4.1.263, ABA-glucosyltransferase, ABA-GTase, AOG) is an enzyme with systematic name UDP-D-glucose:abscisate beta-D-glucosyltransferase. This enzyme catalyses the following chemical reaction

UDP-D-glucose + abscisate $\rightleftharpoons$ UDP + beta-D-glucopyranosyl abscisate

The enzyme acts better on (S)-2-trans-abscisate than the natural (S)-2-cis isomer, abscisate, or its enantiomer, the (R)-2-cis isomer.
