= Adventures of God =

Comedy webtoon by Matteo Ferrazzi and Corey Jay

- The banner art for Adventures of God
- Author: Matteo Ferrazzi
- Illustrator: Corey Jay
- Website: WEBTOON
- Current status/schedule: Updates every Tuesday and Sunday
- Launch date: November 15, 2016
- Publisher(s): WEBTOON, Rocketship Entertainment
- Genre: Comedy
- Rating: 9.42 Stars on WEBTOON

Adventures of God is a comedy webtoon created and respectively written and illustrated by Italian Matteo "Teo" Ferrazzi and American Corey Jay. The comic explores the relationship between God and characters such as his sons Jesus and Lucy, the angel Gabe, and demon Ebag, after confirming the existence of the afterlife to humankind. It began publishing weekly on WEBTOON in November 2016. As of August 2019 it had 100 million views, and as of April 2021 WEBTOON reported that it had 1.4 million subscribers. The comic has been nominated for a Ringo Award in the Humor Comic category, ranking second behind I Hate Fairyland. Adventures of God is published in print by Rocketship Entertainment and was Kickstarted in October 2019.

== Plot synopsis ==
"In this slice of (eternal) life, you'll meet God, visit Heaven and learn that what goes on behind the pearly gates isn't exactly the way the good book describes it. For starters, it's a pretty unhealthy work environment – what with God's ginormous, fragile ego and heavy-drinking problem. The good news is that while heaven is a lot less holy than expected, it's much more hilarious too."

== Major characters ==
The following characters are central to plot lines in the comic and make regular appearances:

- God is the creator of Heaven and Earth, who after awakening after a blackout to find the horribly-outdated Old Testament is still available for people to read on Earth, goes to release an updated version excising controversial views, while reconnecting with his sons Jesus and Lucy and infrequently attempting to overcome his alcoholism.
- Lucifer "Lucy" Morningstar is the ruler of Hell who is outraged to learn that God had been sending all gay people to Hell in order to try and set him up on a date, leading him to convert the frozen lakes of Hell into an ice-skating rink. Lucy also deals with a rogue troop of girls who infrequently attempt to sell their souls to him.
- Jesus is the son of God and Mary, who seeks to reconnect with his father after estrangement in heaven over his death on Earth not being recognized in the modern day.
- Gabe is God's top angel and overseer of Earth, responsible for designing the planet and its people on behalf of God, who helps him live from day-to-day.
- Ebag is Gabe's opposite and Lucy's top demon, who seeks to do the opposite of Gabe in every action, often accidentally accomplishing good.
- Riley is a gay man sent to Hell by God in order to date Lucy. Although initially rejecting Riley and returning him to Heaven, Lucy eventually falls in love with him, and the pair gets married in the 150th episode.
- Satan's Lil' Hellpers are a group of girls who after accidentally figuring out how to summon Lucy (as "Satan") decide to attempt to keep summoning him after he refuses to accept their souls, eventually leading to Lucy helping them with their various problems free of charge. Their names are Jasmine, Kimberly, Britt, and Susan.
- Bub is the angel in charge of Limbo, deciding of those on the borderline between Heaven and Hell upon their deaths to which afterlife they will be sent to.
- Bob is a human who chooses to remain in Limbo with Bub rather than proceed to any other realm after he is given the choice to, joining him in deciding who should go where.
- BoDaDemon is a demon who decides to accompany Bub and Bob after finding himself banished from both Heaven and Hell, seeking to send the wrong people to opposite realms.

== Publication ==
The webcomic updates biweekly on Webtoon. The print edition was Kickstarted in 2019 by publisher Rocketship Entertainment and had its global release on November 9, 2021. Originally drawing the webtoon by hand, Jay illustrates Adventures of God using Photoshop and a Wacom Cintiq Pro drawing tablet.

== Influences ==
In episode descriptions of Adventures of God, Ferrazzi and Jay list their childhood Belgian Sunday school lessons in Bible stories as the primary inspiration for the series. In an interview with Indy100, Ferrazzi further elaborated that:

When I wrote this comic, the central idea behind God's character is that he works in mysterious ways. In the first episode of the series, he cripples an athlete so that he can go on to win the Special Olympics; here, he sends a gay man to hell to help Satan feel less lonely. I like that Satan's gay and conforms to none of the stereotypes we usually associate with gay people. People from all walks of life have told me this comic resonated with them. The LGBT community, of course, because of how it mocks the notion of homosexuality being a sin. But also devout Christians, who feel comics about religion are often snarky and mean-spirited, and were surprised that this one portrayed God in a positive light – even as a flawed character.

== Reception ==
In 2019, WEBTOON announced that Adventures of God had been viewed over 100 million times, making it one of the most viewed webcomic on the platform. As of April 2021, Adventures of God is the nineteenth-most popular webtoon on the platform, with over 1.4 million subscribers.

In an article for Study Breaks, columnist Christine Fang recommended the webcomic, saying it: "prove[s] that biblical stories aren't necessarily boring, and that they make for great comedic content.", ranking it as the best webtoon for newcomers to the genre of comedy. Comparatively comparing the art style to that of Family Guy, Fang further praised the "use of bright colors and overexaggerated facial features t[hat] demonstrate that conversations about Christianity do not always have to be serious; they can be colorful and lighthearted.", concluding that "the solid-colored characters and backgrounds work well with this comedic take on Christianity."

Il Post declared Adventures of God to be one of the best examples of webtoons in general, praising Ferrazzi's and Jay's ability and willingness to "humanize and makes fun of a God full of doubts and with an alcoholism problem."

ObjectifGard reviewer Linda Mansouri said that "the reading experience is more than interesting. The mockups are airy, the bubbles are very readable and the comic strip adapts perfectly to the width of the smartphone. As for the quality of the drawings, it exceeds our expectations. The episodes are quite short and very numerous. The stories of the webtoon inspire the cinema for adaptations on the big screen, but also television series, video games, and even the print edition. It's the complete opposite of French comics, which are designed on paper and then adapted on screen", before concluding the webtoon as a "cultural recommendation" for those in lockdown during the COVID-19 pandemic.

A reviewer for Ayo Bandung praised the unexpected perspective of sacred items and people of Christian beliefs, and ambiguity over the true protagonists and antagonists of the series, before concluding that "[i]t is precisely in this way that the humor that is displayed results in deep reflection."

=== Awards ===
Year	Category	Institution or publication	Result	Notes	Ref.
2017	Best Humor Comic	Ringo Awards	Nominated	Lost to I Hate Fairyland	

== Publications ==
- Ferrazzi, Teo (June 7, 2022). Adventures of God volume 1. Rocketship Entertainment. ISBN 978-1952126048.

== Stage play ==
In February 2019, the Czech Republic Tourism board announced that Adventures of God would serve as the basis for the NoD Theater stage play The Bible 2, jointly directed by Janek Lesák and Natálie Preslová. Presented in four acts, the play is accompanied by a constantly recurring musical jingle by composer Ivo Sedláček. The Bible 2 follows God (Láďa Karda) after just woken up blackout drunk after a big party to celebrate the creation of the world and publication of the Bible, only to discovers that the world is no longer the same one he created, and is soon set to destroy itself, along with the rest of humanity. Will God, together with the Professor (Martin Cikán) and his sons Lucy (Lumíra Přichystalová) and newly Buddhist Jesus (Jan Strýček) be able to write a new Bible and put the world back on track?
