= 2019 in webcomics =

Notable events of 2019 in webcomics.

== Events ==
=== Awards ===
- Aurora Awards, "Best Graphic Novel" won by Kari Maaren's It Never Rains
- Cartoonist Studio Prize, "Best Web Comic" won by Lauren Weinstein's Being an Artist and a Mother
- Eisner Awards, "Best Webcomic" won by Sophie Yanow's The Contradictions
- Harvey Awards, "Digital Book of the Year" won by Ngozi Ukazu's Check, Please!
- Ignatz Awards, "Outstanding Online Comic" won by Hannah Blumenreich's Full Court Crush
- Next Manga Award, "Web Manga" won by Tatsuya Endo's Spy × Family
- Reuben Awards, "Online Comics": Short Form won by Dorothy Gambrell's Cat and Girl, Long Form won by Yuko Ota and Ananth Hirsh's Barbarous
- Ringo Awards, "Best Webcomic" won by The Nib

=== Webcomics started ===
- January 10 — Printernia Nippon by Maigo
- January 17–April 11 — Save Me by Big Hit Entertainment & Studio LICO
- February 15 — Kuchibeta Shokudō by Bonkara
- February 24 — Cursed Princess Club by LambCat
- March 25 — Spy × Family by Tatsuya Endo
- April 3 — Takahashi from the Bike Shop by Arare Matsumushi
- April 9–September 17 — STARCROSS by Dean Haspiel
- April 11 — Pixie Trix Comix by Gisele Lagace, Dave Lumsdon, and T Campbell
- July 18 — The Girl Downstairs by Min Song-a
- August 13 — Crossdressing Pandemic by Mikuzu Shinagawa
- August 17 — A Smart and Courageous Child by Miki Yamamoto
- September 17 — 15 Minutes Before We Really Date by Perico
- September 27 — Plus-Sized Misadventures in Love! by Mamakari
- October 24 — See You Tomorrow at the Food Court by Shinichirō Nariie
- October 26 — Grandpa and Grandma Turn Young Again by Kagiri Araido
- October 27 — Hazbin Hotel "Chapter 1: Dirty Healings"
- October 30 — Wataridori to Katatsumuri by Makoto Takatsu
- October 31 — Fangs by Sarah Andersen
- November 15 — Viral Hit by Park Tae-Jun and Kim Jung-Hyun
- December 7 — Senpai wa Otokonoko by Pom
- December 15 — The Boxer by Jung Ji-Hoon
- December 22 — Cultural Exchange with Game Center Girl by Hirokazu Yasuhara
- December 26 — I Think I Turned My Childhood Friend into a Girl by Azusa Banjo

=== Webcomics ended ===
- Noblesse by Son Je-ho and Lee Kwang-su, 2007 – 2019
- Ménage à 3 by Gisele Lagace & Dave Lumsdon, 2008 – 2019
- Denma by Yang Yeong-soon, 2010 – 2019
- Dents by Beth Behrs, Matt Doyle & Sid Kotian, 2016 – 2019
- Cheshire Crossing (2nd version) by Andy Weir and Sarah Andersen, 2017 – 2019
