= Fixit =

Fixit may refer to:

- Finland's departure from the European Union and the Eurozone
- Fixit, a minor villain in the animated superhero television series Teen Titans
- Fixit, a member of the Micromasters in the Transformers franchise
- Joe Fixit, a dissociative identity/alter of the Hulk (Bruce Banner) in Marvel Comics
- Fixit, a robot character and assistant to Relic in the Sonic the Hedgehog comics
- Mr. Fixit, a fox character in The Busy World of Richard Scarry
- Professor Fixit, a character in the webtoon series Live with Yourself!
