= Syphon (comic series) =

Image Comics series by Mohsen Ashraf

- Cover to Syphon

Publication information
- Publisher: Top Cow Productions (Image Comics)
- Format: Limited series
- Publication date: July 2021 – February 2024
- No. of issues: 7

Creative team
- Created by: Mohsen Ashraf
- Written by: Mohsen Ashraf (#1-7); Patrick Meaney (#1-3); Arish Akanda (#4-7)
- Artist(s): Jeff Edwards (#1-3); Thomas Hedglen (#4-7)
- Inker(s): Jeff Edwards (#1-3); Mostafa Moussa (#4-7)
- Colorist: John Kalisz (#1-7)

Syphon is a fantasy-noir comic series about a supernatural empath, Sylas, who comes to wield an ancient power to heal the suffering of others at the cost of carrying that pain himself.

The series was created by Mohsen Ashraf and published by Image Comics under the Top Cow imprint. The first volume was released in December 2021 and collects the first three issues. It was met with critical acclaim and was nominated for Best Series and Best Artist in the 2022 Ringo Awards, with Sylas selected as Fan Favorite Hero.

A second volume was released in May 2024, collecting the next four issues in the series.

== Plot ==
The story takes place in New York City with Sylas, an EMT, chosen by an ancient power to be its next wielder. This gives him the ability to see the suffering in others and 'syphon' it away. Reeling from this supernatural transference, Sylas inadvertently uses the power on his neighbor, Livia, bringing her instant relief by taking on her burdens. The two grow close and eventually start dating.

Sylas continues employing his powers on and off work, healing the miseries of others to his own detriment. It slowly eats away at him, miring him in depression and damaging his mental health and relationships. One night after an argument with Livia, he unleashes a powerful psychic blast against a man who assaults him on the streets.

Overwhelmed by his burdens, Sylas accepts the help of a fellow wielder of the power, Antonio, who teaches him to syphon people's pleasure rather than their pain. He begins abusing his power, relishing the ecstasy of it, but eventually realizes Antonio's true intentions are far darker than his misguided altruism. Sylas is forced to fight and defeat his former mentor in an astral plane.

Over time, Sylas learns to balance work and love with the responsibility of his power, while his partner Livia, a neuroscientific, explores the impact of emotional trauma and the ethics of healing from it. Their relative calm is upended when Zenia, a brash power-hunter, explodes onto the scene warning of an ancient threat re-awakened.

== Reception ==
=== Awards ===
Year	Award	Category	Nominee	Result	Notes	Ref.
2022	Ringo Awards	Best Series	Syphon	Nominated		
2022	Ringo Awards	Fan Favorite Hero	Sylas (character)	Won		
2022	Ringo Awards	Best Artist or Penciller	Jeff Edwards	Nominated		
