= Astaroth =

Great Duke of Hell in demonology

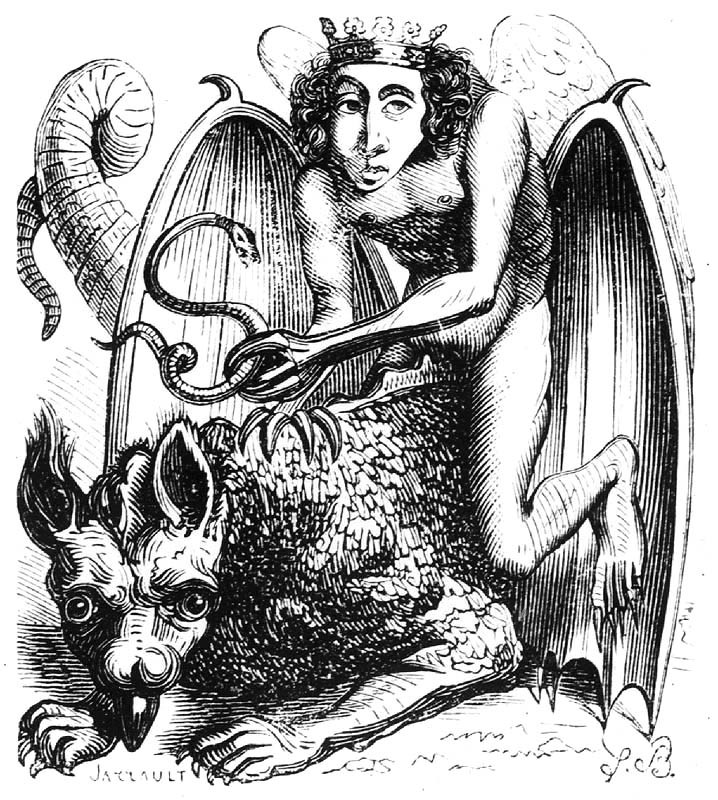
Astaroth illustration from the Dictionnaire Infernal (1818) by Louis Le Breton.

In demonology, Astaroth (also Ashtaroth, Astarot and Astetoth) is an arch-demon. He is considered to be a Great Duke of Hell.

Astaroth was theorized as an alter ego of various goddesses in ancient mythologies across different cultures which were demonized later by the Biblical demonology system.

Astaroth also features as an archdemon associated with the qlippoth (adverse forces).

== Demonization origin ==
The name Astaroth was ultimately derived from that of 2nd millennium BC Phoenician goddess Astarte, who was known in ancient Hebrew and Semitic tribes as Asherah, an equivalent of the Babylonian Ishtar, and the earlier Sumerian Inanna, and the later Greek Aphrodite (Roman Venus).

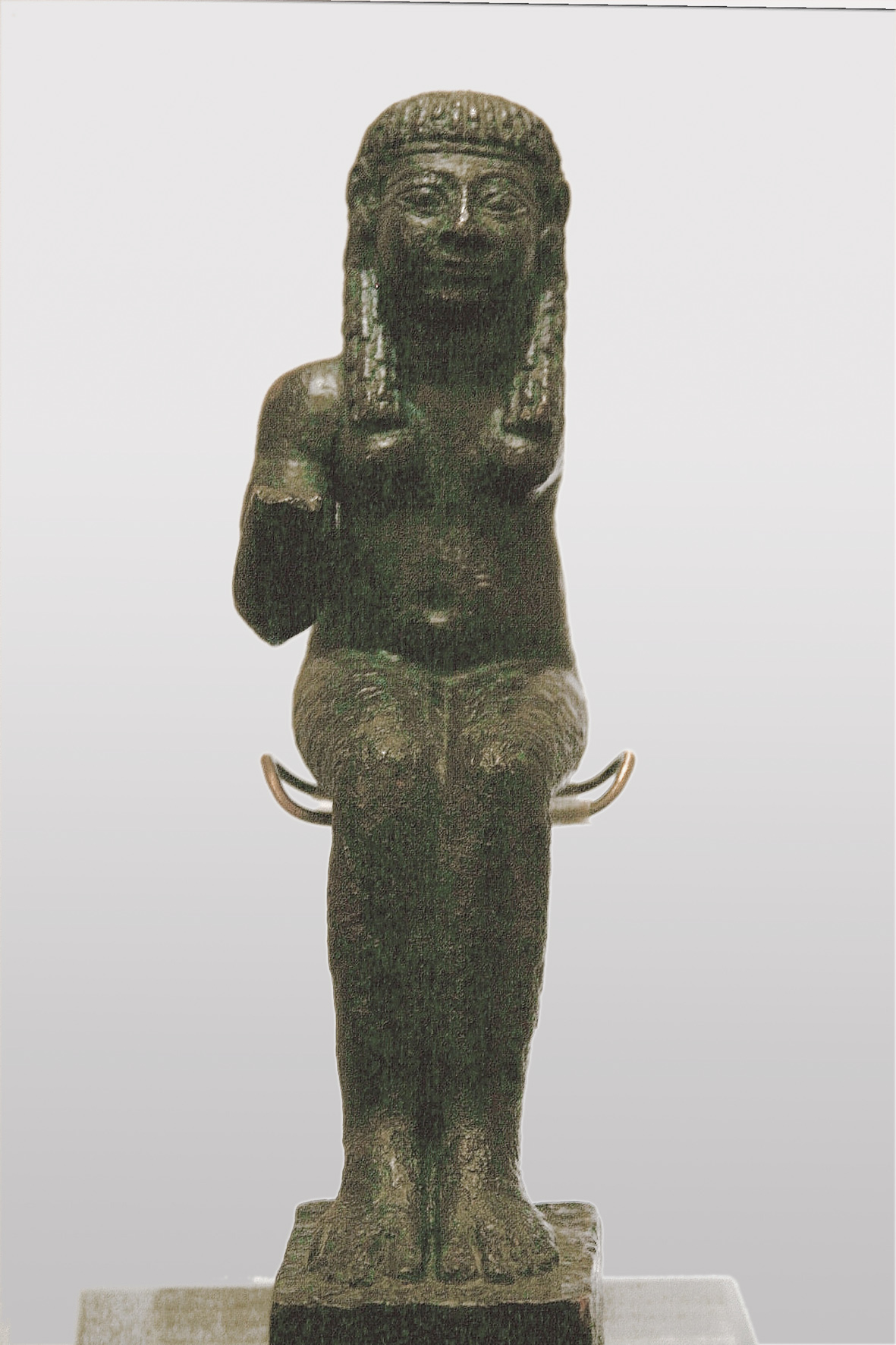
Statue of goddess Astarte from Museum of Sevilla

In this context, D. P. Agrawal has grouped those goddesses as the Ishtar group, which consisted the names of Ishtar, Astarte, Astaroth, and Atargatis, among others.

The name of Astarte was mentioned in the Hebrew Bible in the forms Ashtoreth (singular) and Ashtaroth (plural, in reference to multiple statues of it). This latter form was directly transliterated in the early Greek and Latin versions of the Bible, where it was less apparent that it had been a plural feminine in Hebrew. Apparently, the parallel between goddess Astarte, which also identified as Venus by Reginald Scot with Astaroth as demon, was made in response to the act of Solomon who once performed worship to an idol of Astarte from Sidon.

The name of Ashtoreth was also known as one of the island in Erythia. Samuel Bochart then deduced the etymology of "Astaroth" must be "Asta Erythes" (the city of Erytha).

According to Jeffrey Burton Russell, the Islamic belief system implies that female deities such as Al-Lat are manifestations of Shaitan deception, based on classical interpretations. Russell refers to the epigraphic evidence from Palmyra and Taif presented by Ignaz Goldziher to identify al-Lat with Astarte.

=== Zoroastrianism demonology ===
Scholarly sources, including The Jewish Encyclopedia (1906), A.V. Williams Jackson’s Zoroastrianism and the Resemblances between It and Christianity (1906), and Mark S. Smith’s The Origins of Biblical Monotheism (2000), indicate that Zoroastrian dualism, with its contrast between Ahura Mazda and Angra Mainyu, alongside the monotheistic shift in ancient Israel, provided a theological framework for demonizing pagan deities, enabling the transformation of the Canaanite goddess Astarte into the demonic Astaroth in Christian demonology.

Ferdinand Justi also attributed Zoroastrianism religion as the first ones to denounce the Aryan pagan worship towards Astaroth and Baal, implying their contribution to the demonization of those deities.

Concordantiae Caritatis, a chart written by Ulrich von Lilienfeld, depicted Astaroth as one of the seven archdevils representing Seven deadly sins. In this chart, Astaroth represents sloth, with a symbolic form of donkey. Ulrich was borrowing the iconography from Zoroastrianism.

=== Bible demonization ===
The interpretation of First Epistle to the Corinthians verse 10:20 in Christian theology, which equates pagan sacrifices with offerings to demons, contributed to the broader demonization of deities like Astarte (biblical Ashtoreth), later transformed into the demon Astaroth. Scholarly sources suggest that Paul’s statement provided a theological framework for viewing Gentile worship, including that of Astarte, as demonic, though no direct reference to her appears in the verse. Commentaries, such as Albert Barnes’ Notes on the Whole Bible and Coffman’s Commentaries, argue that Paul’s demonology implicitly includes deities like Astarte, particularly in Corinth’s Hellenistic context, where her worship resembled that of Aphrodite. The World History Encyclopedia and Encyclopedia of Demons in World Religions and Cultures note that Astarte’s transformation into Astaroth, a male demon, occurred in medieval demonology, influenced by this New Testament perspective. By the early 11th century, Ælfric of Eynsham’s sermon explicitly depicts Astaroth as a demon, reflecting the culmination of this demonizing trend rooted in earlier Christian thought.

=== Tale of Saint Bartholomew ===
The name Astaroth appeared during a sermon by Ælfric of Eynsham (d.1010 ce). Ælfric describes the demon named Astaroth as "immense Ethiop, with sharp visage and ample beard" (micel Æþiop, mid scarpum andsaca and mycelum berd), which Benjamin Thorpe interprets as "black-faced devil".

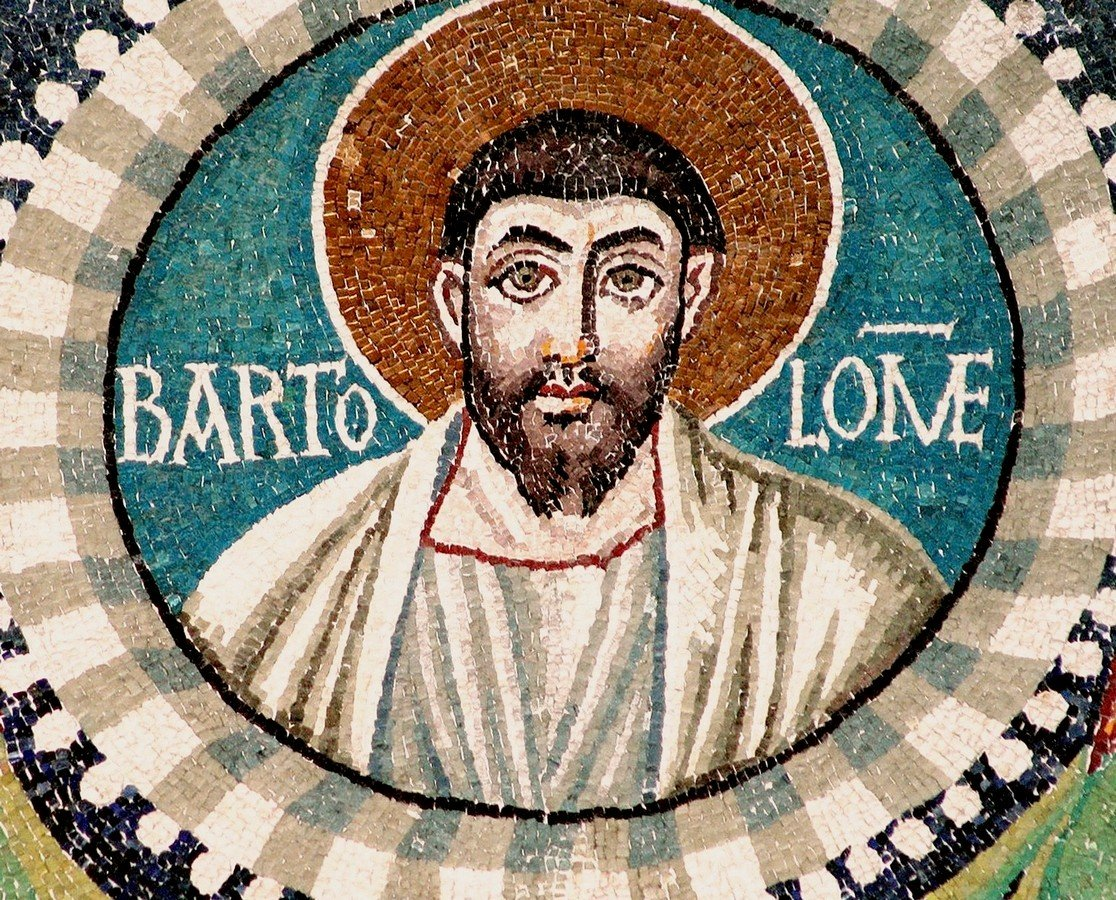
Bartholomew the Apostle, detail of the mosaic in the Basilica of San Vitale, Ravenna, 6th century

Ælfric mentioned a Latin translation of "Martyrdom of Bartholomew", which relates to the account of Bartholomew's voyage to India to help the people there from Astaroth's deception. The devil tricked them into adoring him by inflicting diseases on them and promising to cure them only if they made offerings to him. This narrative continues with the conflict between Bartholomew and Astaroth, which ends with the former's victory and freeing of the people from the shackles of worshipping Astaroth. However, the narrative concludes with Bartholomew being murdered by a local king who becomes upset about the religious change perpetrated by Bartholomew.

Similarly, in the apocryphal Passion of Bartholomew and Jacobus de Voragine’s Golden Legend (1275), Astaroth is depicted as a deceptive demon masquerading as a healing deity in a temple, manipulating worshippers by inflicting diseases and offering false cures. Scholarly analyses, such as J.K. Elliott’s The Apocryphal New Testament (1993) and William Granger Ryan’s commentary in The Golden Legend: Readings on the Saints (1993), highlight that Astaroth’s role reflects the Christian demonization of pagan gods like Astarte, portraying the demon as a symbol of idolatry defeated by Bartholomew’s missionary efforts.

The modern commentary from Medieval Institute of Jacobus de Voragine's work titled "Life of Saint Bartholomew" about the location where Bartholomew fought Astaroth was actually Medieval Armenia, as Armenia during that time was known as third India. This clarity about the location also was attested by the commentary from François Guizot of Orderic Vitalis's work. In this context, the antiquities term of "India" divided into several regions, where the first was meant for a region which extends to modern Ethiopia; the second India was Medes; while the last India, where the worship of Astaroth took place, and was visited by Bartholomew, is a region "bounded on one side by the region of darkness, on the other by the ocean.".

One of the most clear mentions of the Catholic demonification of Astaroth the goddess was found in "Las cadenas del demonio" (The Devil's Fetters) in 1636 written by Pedro Calderón de la Barca (1600-1681), which told the origin of the spread of Christianity in Armenia by Bartholomew in response of the Armenian people worship towards Astaroth in a slightly different premise. The narrative tells of how the worship of the demon was initiated by Princess Irene, a daughter of a king, who was imprisoned and denied by her father after his court astrologists told him that Irene would bring ruin to his kingdom. Faced with such a condition, Irene prayed to the gods of her pagan religion. In response to her prayer, a figure of a young man, whom she believes to be the physical manifestation of the god Astaroth, appeared to grant her wish. The narration of de la Barca stated that the man who appeared before Irene is actually a demon, not the pagan deity's manifestation.

Further depiction about the rivalry between Astaroth and Saint Bartholomew also mentioned by Francisco de Sobrecasas(d.1698). Sobrecasas wrote in 'Ideas varias de orar evangélicamente", that Astaroth is a monstrous force which causes ruin to the community.

=== Kabbalah and Occultism ===
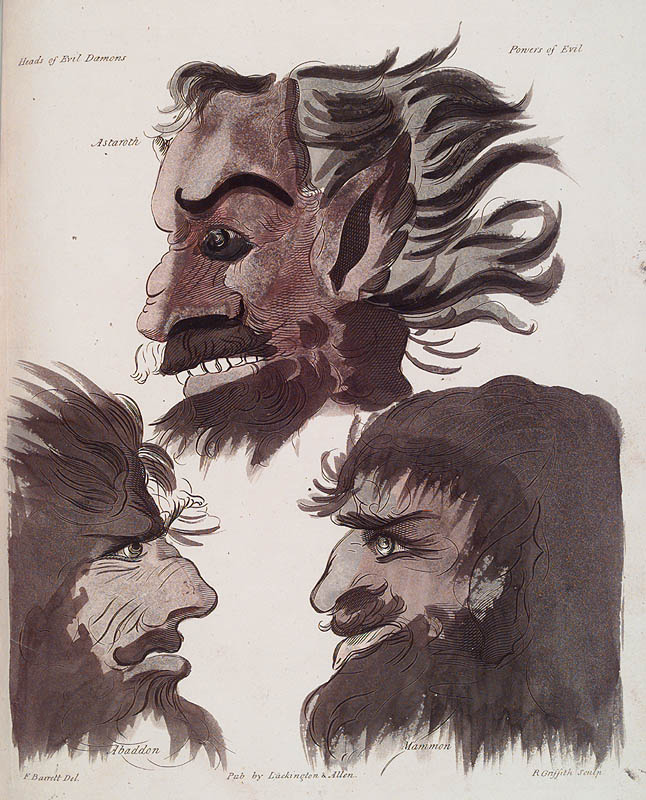
A diagram of the demon's head from Francis Barrett's Magus. Astaroth is at the top center.

In the Kabbalah system, Astarte's demonization is explained as the process of transformation from a pagan goddess into a male demon, in which Astarte (as Ashtaroth or Astaroth) becomes the negative manifestation of the Sephirah Chesed ((the fourth Sephirah, representing mercy, generosity, and the expansive flow of the divine).

Furthermore, Astaroth also featured as an archdemon according to later Kabbalistic texts, who rules over the qlippa of Jupiter, known as Gha'agsheblah.

French occultist Jacques Collin de Plancy wrote an entry of Astaroth in his work, Dictionnaire Infernal. The artistic depiction of the demon, which was illustrated by Louis Le Breton, was described as a nude man with reptilian claws punctuating long hands and feet, feathered wings, wearing a crown, holding a serpent in one hand, and riding a lupine demon with dragon-like wings and a serpent-like tail. Collin de Plancy himself described the demon as "a very ugly angel," his bushy hair kept under the crown of "a very powerful grand-duke.".

In 20th century, Astaroth is mentioned in various literatures, often with very small details. Arthur Edward Waite mentioned in his work, "The Book of Black Magic and of Pacts", that before Astaroth fell from heaven, he was a prince of the order of thrones. In another quote from Waite's other work, "The Lemegeton", Astaroth was referred as a great duke in the infernal regions. Meanwhile, Lewis Spence also mentioned Astaroth in his work, ":An Encyclopedia of Occultism". According to Spence, Astaroth was from the order of seraphim.

Francis Barrett (c. 1801) has mentioned Astaroth in his work, The Magus, as one of the nine princes of hell. Barrett placed him as the eighth prince of the group. Furthermore, Barrett also mentioned him as the prince of accusers and inquisitors. Barrett also stated that Astaroth is called Diabolus in the Greek language. Furthermore, Barrett also maintained that the demon has set up residence in America.

The idolatry of Astaroth was also somehow related to the root of modern Wicca occultism. Gerald Gardner, a 19-20th century English occultist, participated in excavations of a temple devoted to Astaroth in Palestine. After Gardner returned to England later on, he has reportedly claimed himself to be able to recall memories of his former lives.

However, Lon Milo DuQuette and Christopher Hyatt opined that the male demon Astaroth is entirely unrelated to the benevolent goddess Ashtoreth.

== Appearance in other literatures ==
Astaroth has appeared in The Book of Abramelin, purportedly written in Hebrew c. 1458, and recurred in most occult grimoires of the following centuries.

Seal of Astaroth, as depicted in The Lesser Key of Solomon

Byzantine history expert Richard P. H. Greenfield noted that Astaroth also appeared in Eastern Orthodoxy tradition of demonology.

In 1469, Johann Georg Faust mentioned Astaroth as one of the rulers of infernal kingdom in his work, "Faust’s Miraculous Art and Book of Marvels, or the Black Raven”.

Astaroth also mentioned as one of co-signatories of a Diabolical pact between various demons with Urban Grandier.

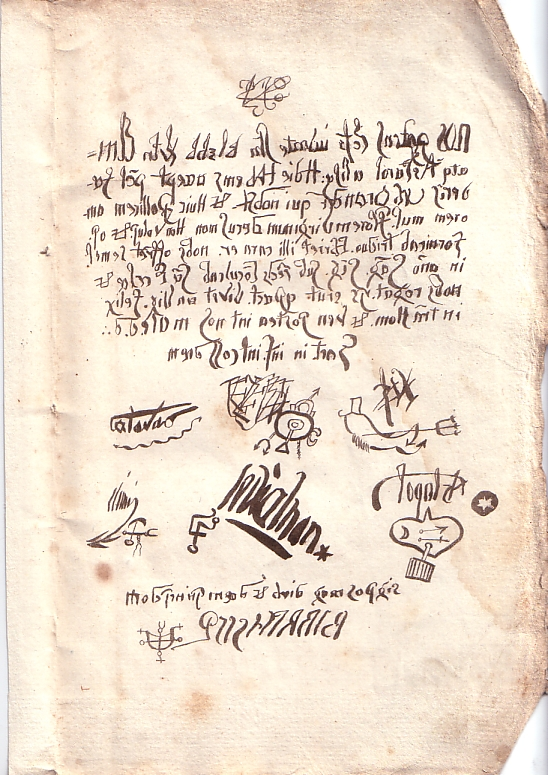
The copy of alleged diabolical Pact between some of demon lords, including Astaroth, with Urban Grandier. The pact was written in Backwards Latin

Astaroth was mentioned in Grandier's satanic pact and during the exorcism of a nun named Ursuline. Aldous Huxley refers to a court transcript in which Astaroth is described as a seraphim demon who spoke through the abbess Jeanne des Anges, whom the demon possessed.

Dutch demonologist Johann Weyer mentioned Astaroth in his work, Pseudomonarchia Daemonum (1577), whom he stated as the great duke of hell with a shape of foul angel, who sat upon a hellish dragon creature, and carrying a snake on his left hand (right hand according to Reginald Scot.)" Astaroth could be summoned with a specific magical ring. Weyer also further described that there are around 40 legions which commanded by Astaroth.

According to some demonologists of the 16th century, August is sometimes cited as the month when the demon Astaroth's influence and attacks on humans are considered strongest. This belief stems from 16th-century demonologists, such as Sebastien Michaelis, who designated August as a peak time for Astaroth's temptations, particularly through promoting laziness, vanity, and rationalized philosophies.

Astaroth was similarly referred to in the 17th-century work The Lesser Key of Solomon.

Astaroth also makes an appearance in the book of Grimorium Verum (True Grimoire), as the infernal principality which rules the Americas.

== Depiction in popular culture ==
- Ashtaroth is one of three demons summoned by Faustus to attack Benvolio in Doctor Faustus.
- In the Japanese Anime and Manga Black Clover, the Demon Megicula is based on Astoroth.
- The "Star of Astoroth" features prominently in the 1971 Disney film Bedknobs and Broomsticks, where it takes the form of a magical medallion.
- Astaroth is named in the 1976 Hammer horror film To the Devil a Daughter.
- Astaroth is the Shadowlord of Hatred, one of the primary antagonists, in Origin Systems' Ultima V: Warriors of Destiny.
- In the 1920 silent horror film The Golem: How He Came into the World, Rabbi Loew and his assistant summon Astaroth to animate the Golem, resulting in deadly and destructive results.
- Astaroth is the name of the main antagonist of the Ghosts 'n Goblins series of video games. He is the arch-nemesis of Arthur who sends his demon henchmen to kidnap Princess Prin Prin, forcing Arthur to go fight him and rescue the princess. He is the final boss of the original game and appears in subsequent games as either a lower-ranking boss or a mini-boss.
- Astaroth appears in the 2007 television series Blood Ties, with his symbol displayed in the first few episodes.
- The Solomonic seal of Astaroth makes an appearance in the 2017 film Pyewacket.
- Astaroth symbolism is prevalent in the 2018 film Antrum: The Deadliest Film Ever Made, and a symbol of Astaroth appears in the film over 170 times.
- Astaroth is the title character in Astaroth Female Demon, a film by the Brazilian director Larissa Anzoategui. The name of the company that made the film is Astaroth Produções.
- Astaroth appears as the main antagonist of the 2022 film R.I.P.D. 2: Rise of the Damned.
- Astaroth is a major character in the webcomic Love Advice from the Great Duke of Hell, being the titular Great Duke.
- Astaroth is the main antagonist of the FAITH: The Unholy Trinity series under the pseudonym "Gary Miller", who leads a satanic cult titled "The Eternal Order of the Second Death". A track in the game is directly named after Astaroth, which plays during the battle against him.

== See also ==
- Asherah
- Atargatis

== Appendix ==
=== Bibliography ===
- Samuel Liddell MacGregor Mathers, A. Crowley, The Goetia: The Lesser Key of Solomon the King (1904). 1995 reprint: ISBN 0-87728-847-X.
- Burke, Tony, ed. (2022). Passion of Bartholomew. e-Clavis: Christian Apocrypha.
- de Voragine, Jacobus (1275). Ryan, William Granger (ed.). The Golden Legend. Vol. 2. Princeton, NJ: Princeton University Press. pp. 118–122. ISBN 978-0-691-00153-1.
