= Isola (comics) =

Comic series

- Cover of Isola – Chapter One; Art by Karl Kerschl and MSassyK

Publication information
- Publisher: Image Comics
- Schedule: Monthly (#1–5); Bimonthly (#6–present)
- Format: Ongoing
- Publication date: April 2018 – present

Creative team
- Created by: Brenden Fletcher; Karl Kerschl
- Written by: Brenden Fletcher; Karl Kerschl
- Artist(s): Karl Kerschl
- Letterer(s): Aditya Bidikar
- Colorist(s): MSassyK

Collected editions
- Chapter One: ISBN 9781534309227

Isola is an American ongoing fantasy comic series created by writer Brenden Fletcher and writer/artist Karl Kerschl and published by Image Comics.

The series is set in a mystical land where the queen’s brother enacts a treacherous plot to transform her into a tiger. The captain of the guard, a woman of great skill, brings swift and lethal vengeance, unaware the wicked prince alone has the power to reverse the spell. The two women—one on two legs, one on four—must undertake a perilous journey halfway across the globe to the fabled island of Isola, the gateway to the underworld, where they hope to find the spirit of the queen’s late brother, who has the power to return his sister to human form.

== Publication history ==
Isola was first announced at the 2016 Image Expo. Writer Brenden Fletcher explained he and writer/artist Karl Kerschl had been working towards the comic since elementary school. The story follows two women, Queen Olwyn, and Rook, her captain of the guard, on a journey to the island of Isola in hopes of reversing a curse that transformed the queen into a tiger. Kerschl and Fletcher cite the films of Hayao Miyazaki as an influence on the tone of Isola. Kerschl worked closely with colorist Michele Assarasakorn (MSassyK) to create a cinematic feel, mapping out colors in advance to reflect the characters’ journey.

The series was originally scheduled for launch in spring 2017 but was delayed until spring 2018. Motor Crush, another Image Comics series written by Fletcher, ran a five-part prologue to Isola as a backup feature. The prologue is currently available to read on Karl Kerschl's website.

=== Issues ===
Chapter	Issue	Release date
Prelude	Motor Crush #1	December 7, 2016
Prelude	Motor Crush #2	January 11, 2017
Prelude	Motor Crush #3	February 8, 2017
Prelude	Motor Crush #4	March 8, 2017
Prelude	Motor Crush #5	April 12, 2017
Chapter One	#1	April 4, 2018
Chapter One	#2	May 9, 2018
Chapter One	#3	June 6, 2018
Chapter One	#4	July 11, 2018
Chapter One	#5	August 29, 2018
Chapter Two	#6	January 16, 2019
Chapter Two	#7	March 27, 2019
Chapter Two	#8	June 26, 2019
Chapter Two	#9	September 11, 2019
Chapter Two	#10	February 5, 2020

=== Collections ===
Title	Release date	Collects	ISBN
Isola – Chapter One	October 24, 2018	Isola #1–5	9781534309227
Isola – Chapter Two	July 1, 2020	Isola #6–10	9781534313538

== Reception ==
Reception to the first issue was mostly positive. Jenna Anderson of Comicbook praised the world-building and how Isola’s characters are defined through their actions. Molly Barnewitz of Comicsverse particularly praised Rook’s characterization. However, David Pepose of Newsarama felt the story was too decompressed and that its only selling point was Kerschl’s art. Karl Kerschl and MSassyK’s art received universal praise.

The Eisner-winning digital comics magazine PanelxPanel selected Isola as its feature comic for April 2018. This was particularly notable since PanelxPanel normally selects comics with longer runs, specifically avoiding comics with only a single issue out. Editor Hassan Otsmane-Elhaou explained in his introduction that he had made an exception for Isola #1 since it is markedly different from most other first issues, specifically that it was "more contemplative and less expository, but deeply interesting and worthwhile."

=== Awards ===
Year	Award	Category	Nominee	Result	Ref.
2019	Eisner Awards	Best New Series	Brenden Fletcher and Karl Kerschl	Nominated	
2019	Eisner Awards	Best Penciller/Inker	Karl Kerschl	Nominated	
2019	Eisner Awards	Best Cover Artist	Karl Kerschl	Nominated	
2019	Ringo Awards	Mike Wieringo Spirit Award	Isola	Won	
