= Ringo Awards =

Annual comic book award

Mike Wieringo Comic Book Industry Awards
- Awarded for: Achievement in comic books
- Location: Baltimore Comic-Con
- Country: United States
- First award: 2017
- Website: ringoawards.com

The Mike Wieringo Comic Book Industry Awards, commonly shortened to the Ringo Awards, are prizes given for achievement in comic books. They are named in honor of artist Mike Wieringo and they were founded by the Reisterstown, Maryland–based Cards, Comics, & Collectibles shop alongside the Ringo Awards Committee in 2017, their ceremony meant to succeed the Harvey Awards which left the Baltimore Comic-Con as its venue in 2016.

The Ringo Awards are nominated by an open vote among comic-book professionals and fans. The winners are selected from the top two fan choices as the first two nominees and the professional jury selects the remaining three nominees in each category.

== History ==
The Ringo Awards were created as an industry award voted by comics professionals and its fans. The first Ringo Awards were presented at the Baltimore Comic-Con on September 23, 2017. The 2018 awards took place at the Baltimore Comic-Con on September 29, 2018. The 2019 awards were held October 19, 2019 at the Baltimore Comic-Con. The 2020 awards were held October 24, 2020 at Baltimore Comic-Con Live, the Baltimore Comic-Con's virtual live-streaming event held during COVID-19.

== Categories ==
The Ringo Awards are awarded in the following categories:

=== Current ===
As of 2023, awards are presented in 23 categories for works published in 2020.

Perennial Jury Nomination:

- The Mike Wieringo Spirit Award (2017–present)

Fan-Only Nominations:

- Favorite Hero (2017–present)
- Favorite Villain (2017–present)
- Favorite New Series (2017–present)
- Favorite New Talent (2017–present)
- Favorite Publisher (2018–present)

Fan and Pro Nomination Categories:

- Best Cartoonist (Writer/Artist) (2017–present)
- Best Writer (2017–present)
- Best Artist or Penciller (2017–present)
- Best Inker (2017–present)
- Best Letterer (2017–present)
- Best Colorist (2017–present)
- Best Cover Artist (2017–present)
- Best Series (2017–present)
- Best Single Issue or Story (2017–present)
- Best Original Graphic Novel (2017–present)
- Best Anthology (2017–present)
- Best Humor Comic (2017–present)
- Best Webcomic (2017–present)
- Best Humor Webcomic (2021–present)
- Best Non-fiction Comic Work (2017–present)
- Best Kids Comic or Graphic Novel (2018–present)
- Best Presentation in Design (2017–present)

=== Past awards ===
Fan and Pro Nomination Categories:

- Best Comic Strip or Panel (2017–2020)

== Award winners ==
=== Characters ===
==== [Fan] Favorite Hero ====
Year	Character	Series	Publisher	Ref
2017	Cash Wayne	Spectrum	WEBTOON	
2018	Mags	Assassin Roommate	WEBTOON	
2019	Toaster Dude	Toaster Dude	WEBTOON	
2020	Clove	SubZero	WEBTOON	
2021	Persphone	Lore Olympus	WEBTOON	
2022	Sylas	Syphon	Image Comics	
2023	Sam Young	Let's Play	WEBTOON	
2024	Lenore	Nevermore	WEBTOON	
2025	Alex	Señorita Cometa	WEBTOON	
2026	Batman	Batman/Detective Comics	DC Comics	

==== [Fan] Favorite Villain ====
Year	Character	Series	Publisher	Ref
2017	Arlo	unOrdinary	WEBTOON	
2018	Arlo	unOrdinary	WEBTOON	
2019	Lance Cordrey	Aberrant	Action Lab Entertainment	
2020	John	unOrdinary	WEBTOON	
2021	Emma	My Deepest Secret	WEBTOON	
2022	Captain Martell	Blowback	Self-published	
2023	Adam	The Guy Upstairs	WEBTOON	
2024	Montresor	Nevermore	WEBTOON	
2025	Mr. Barnaby	Warm Fusion	DSTLRY	
2026	Doctor Doom	Fantastic Four	Marvel Comics	

=== Companies ===
==== [Fan] Favorite Publisher ====
Year	Publisher	Ref
2018	Line Webtoon	
2019	Dynamite Entertainment	
2020	Tapas	
2021	Rocketship Entertainment	
2022	Image Comics	
2023	Dark Horse Comics	
2024	Image Comics	
2025	Mad Cave Studios	
2026	Etan Comics	

=== People ===
==== [Fan] Favorite New Talent ====
Year	Winner	Ref
2017	InstantMiso	
2018	Quimchee	
2019	Enjelicious	
2020	Sinran	
2021	Lilydusk	
2022	Vincent Kings	
2023	Ellie Wright	
2024	Danny Earls	
2025	Annie Wright	
2026	Reese Hannigan	

==== Best Cartoonist (Writer/Artist) ====
Year	Winner	Ref
2017	Skottie Young	
2018	Joëlle Jones	
2019	Terry Moore	
2020	Stan Sakai	
2021	Stan Sakai	
2022	Jeff Lemire	
2023	Kate Beaton	
2024	Jeff Smith	
2025	Eric Powell	
2026	Craig Thompson	

==== Best Writer ====
Year	Winner	Ref
2017	Tom King	
2018	Tom King	
2019	Brian K. Vaughan	
2020	Mariko Tamaki	
2021	James Tynion IV	
2022	James Tynion IV	
2023	Ed Brubaker	
2024	James Tynion IV	
2025	Kelly Thompson	
2026	Deniz Camp	

==== Best Artist or Penciller ====
Year	Winner	Ref
2017	Fiona Staples	
2018	Lee Weeks	
2019	Sean Philips	
2020	Sanford Greene	
2021	Jamal Campell	
2022	Filipe Andrade	
2023	Evan “Doc” Shaner	
2024	Elsa Charretier	
2025	Chris Samnee	
2026	Javier Rodriguez	

==== Best Inker ====
Year	Winner	Ref
2017	Sean Murphy	
2018	Mark Morales	
2019	Fiona Staples	
2020	Sandra Hope	
2021	Sanford Greene	
2022	Sal Buscema	
2023	Klaus Janson	

==== Best Letterer ====
Year	Winner	Ref
2017	Todd Klein	
2018	Todd Klein	
2019	Todd Klein	
2020	Nate Piekos	
2021	Aditya Bidikar	
2022	Taylor Esposito	
2023	Stan Sakai (co-winner)	
2023	Hassan Otsmane-Elhaou (co-winner)	
2024	Stan Sakai	
2025	Richard Starkings	
2026	Hassan Otsmane-Elhaou	

==== Best Colorist ====
Year	Winner	Ref
2017	Laura Martin	
2018	Dave Stewart	
2019	Tamra Bonvillain	
2020	Jordie Bellaire	
2021	Tamra Bonvillain	
2022	Dave McCaig	
2023	Jordie Bellaire	
2024	Tamra Bonvillain	
2025	Jordie Bellaire	
2026	Dave Stewart	

==== Best Cover Artist ====
Year	Winner	Ref
2017	Frank Cho	
2018	Michael Cho	
2019	Fiona Staples	
2020	Sana Takeda	
2021	Peach Momoko	
2022	Simone Di Meo	
2023	Greg Smallwood	
2024	Chris Samnee	
2025	Bilquis Evely	
2026	Javier Rodriguez	

=== Works ===
==== Mike Wieringo Spirit Award ====
Year	Winner	Publisher	Ref
2017	Future Quest #1	DC Comics	
2018	Mech Cadet Yu	BOOM! Studios	
2019	Isola	Image Comics	
2020	Superman Smashes the Klan	DC Comics	
2021	Folklords	BOOM! Studios	
2022	Jonna and the Unpossible Monsters	Oni Press	
2023	World's Finest	DC Comics	
2024	The Hunger and the Dusk	IDW Publishing	
2025	Welcome to the Maynard	Dark Horse Comics	
2026	The Avengers in the Veracity Trap	Abrams ComicArts	

==== [Fan] Favorite New Series ====
Year	Winner	Publisher	Ref
2017	Spectrum		
2018	I Love Yoo		
2019	Luff		
2020	Fangs	Tapas	
2021	Midnight Poppy Land		
2022	Clinic of Horros	WEBTOON	
2023	Nevermore	WEBTOON	
2024	City of Blank	WEBTOON	
2025	The Pedestrian	Magma Comix	
2026	Excavator	D4K Studios	

==== Best Series ====
Year	Winner	Publisher	Ref
2017	Vision	Marvel Comics	
2017	Faith	Valiant Entertainment	
2017	Paper Girls	Image Comics	
2017	Saga	Image Comics	
2017	Spectrum	Automatic Pictures	
2018	Mister Miracle	DC Comics	
2018	Batman	DC Comics	
2018	Lady Killer	Dark Horse Comics	
2018	Spencer & Locke	Action Lab Entertainment	
2018	Sunstone	Image Comics	
2019	Black Hammer: Age of Doom	Dark Horse Comics	
2019	The Immortal Hulk	Marvel Comics	
2019	Bitter Root	Image Comics	
2019	Blammo	Kilgore Books	
2019	The Highest House	IDW Publishing	
2019	Venom	Marvel Comics	
2020	Bitter Root	Image Comics	
2020	Banjax	Danger Zone (Action Lab Entertainment)	
2020	Black Hammer: Age of Doom	Dark Horse Comics	
2020	Forgotten Home	Vices Press/comiXology Originals	
2020	Something is Killing the Children	BOOM! Studios	
2021	Usagi Yojimbo	IDW Publishing	
2021	The Department of Truth	Image Comics	
2021	Far Sector	DC	
2021	Lore Olympus	WEBTOON	
2021	My Deepest Secret	WEBTOON	
2021	Wonder Woman: Dead Earth	DC	
2022	Something is Killing the Children	BOOM! Studios	
2022	Locke & Key/The Sandman Universe: Hell & Gone	IDW Publishing	
2022	The Many Deaths of Laila Starr	BOOM! Studios	
2022	Stray Dogs	Image Comics	
2022	Syphon	Image Comics	
2023	Something is Killing the Children	BOOM! Studios	
2023	Fractured Shards	Comics2Movies	
2023	Parker Girls	Abstract Studios	
2023	Saga	Image Comics	
2023	Season of the Bruja	Oni Press	
2024	Geiger: Ground Zero	Image Comics	
2024	The Night Eaters	Abrams ComicArts	
2024	Phantom Road	Image Comics	
2024	Rare Flavours	BOOM! Studios	
2024	Sirens of the City	BOOM! Studios	
2024	Tower	A Wave Blue World	
2025	The Pedestrian	Magma Comix	
2025	Beneath the Trees Where Nobody Sees	IDW Publishing	
2025	The Blood Brothers Mother	DSTLRY	
2025	Helen of Wyndhorn	Dark Horse Comics	
2025	Masters of the Universe: Revolution	Dark Horse Comics	
2026	Absolute Batman	DC Comics	
2026	Absolute Martian Manhunter	DC Comics	
2026	Coexistence	Self-published	
2026	FML	Dark Horse Comics	
2026	Granite State Punk	Orange Cone Productions	
2026	Murder Podcast	Ignition Press	

==== Best Single Issue or Story ====
Also referred to as Best Short Story

Year	Winner	Publisher	Ref
2017	Emancipation Day	www.redistrictedcomics.com	
2017	Deadly Hands of Criminal	Image Comics	
2017	DC Universe Rebirth #1	DC Comics	
2017	Faith #1	Valiant Entertainment	
2017	Locke & Key: Small World	IDW Publishing	
2018	Batman/Elmer Fudd Special	DC Comics	
2018	Batman Annual #2	DC Comics	
2018	Doomsday Clock #1	DC Comics	
2018	I Am Groot	Marvel Comics	
2018	Mister Miracle #5	DC Comics	
2019	Swamp Thing Winter Special	DC Comics	
2019	Aberrant #4	Danger Zone	
2019	Black Hammer: Cthu-Louise	Dark Horse Comics	
2019	Champions #24	Marvel Comics	
2019	Klaus and the Crying Snowman	BOOM! Studios	
2020	Usagi Yojimbo #6	IDW Publishing	
2020	Bitter Root Red Summer Special	Image Comics	
2020	“Hot Comb” in Hot Comb	Drawn & Quarterly	
2020	Second Coming #1	Danger Zone (Action Lab Entertainment)	
2020	Tales of the Night Watchman: The Steam Banshee	So What? Press	
2021	The O.Z.	Self-published	
2021	All-America Comix #1	Image Comics	
2021	Firefly: The Outlaw Ma Reynolds	BOOM! Studios	
2021	Marcy and the Riddle of the Sphinx	Flying Eye Books	
2021	"Mene, Mene, Tekel, Upharsin” in Ice Cream Man Presents Quarantine Comix Special #1	Image Comics	
2022	Something Is Killing the Children #20	BOOM! Studios	
2022	Commander RAO #1	Scout Comics	
2022	Mamo #1	BOOM! Studios	
2022	The Many Deaths of Laila Starr	BOOM! Studios	
2022	Tales of the Night Watchman: Under the Surface	So What? Press	
2023	Jonna and the Unpossible Monsters	Oni Press	
2023	88 Days of Hell: One Ukrainian Man's Experience in the Russian Filtration	Insider	
2023	A Hunter's Tale	Elephant Eater Comics	
2023	“Finding Batman” in DC Pride 2022	DC Comics	
2023	Punisher #1	Marvel Comics	
2023	Thieves	Nobrow	
2023	You Were My Joker That Night	Anatola Howard	
2024	Animal Pound #1	BOOM! Studios	
2024	By The Horns: Dark Earth #7	Scout Comics	
2024	Etheres	Source Point Press	
2024	Rare Flavours #1	BOOM! Studios	
2024	Somna	DSTLRY	
2024	Star Trek: Day of Blood – Shaxs' Best Day	IDW Publishing	
2025	Batman and Robin Year One #1	DC Comics	
2025	A Blue Flame” in Second Hand Love	Drawn & Quarterly	
2025	The Crying Boy	Keenspot Entertainment	
2025	Death Ratio'd	AWA Studios	
2025	FML #1	Dark Horse Comics	
2025	Helen of Wyndhorn	Dark Horse Comics	
2025	Navigating with You	Maverick	
2025	A Never-Ending Adventure	Oscar Osorio	
2025	Trinity Special: World's Finest #1	DC Comics	
2026	Chest Face	self-published	
2026	“Pied Piper” in Cthulhu Invades Fairy Tales	Orange Cone Productions	
2026	“The Knife and Gun Club” in Detective Comics #1100	DC Comics	
2026	The Fire Breathing Duckling	Astra Books for Young Readers	
2026	“Red Snapper in the Rea” in Milk White Steed	Drawn & Quarterly	
2026	Model Five Murder	Silver Sprocket	

==== Best Original Graphic Novel ====
Year	Winner	Publisher	Ref
2017	March: Book III	Top Shelf Productions	
2017	Ghosts	Scholastic/Graphix	
2017	Patience	Fantagraphics	
2017	Tetris: The Games People Play	First Second	
2017	Wonder Woman: The True Amazon	DC Comics	
2018	My Favorite Thing is Monsters	Fantagraphics	
2018	The Aggregate	Split Decision Comics	
2018	The Best We Could Do	Abrams ComicArts	
2018	Hostage	Drawn & Quarterly	
2018	Spinning	First Second	
2019	My Heroes Have Always Been Junkies	Image Comics	
2019	The Ghost, The Owl	Action Lab Entertainment	
2019	Son of Hitler	Image Comics	
2019	Upgrade Soul	Lion Forge	
2019	Woman World	Drawn & Quarterly	
2020	Snow, Glass, Apples	Dark Horse Comics	
2020	The Adventures of Parker Reef – To Save a Soul	Chris Campana	
2020	BTTM FDRS	Fantagraphics	
2020	Dog Man: For Whom the Ball Rolls	Graphix/Scholastic	
2020	The Hard Tomorrow	Drawn & Quarterly	
2020	Hot Comb	Drawn & Quarterly	
2020	New World	BOOM! Studios	
2020	Penny Nichols	Top Shelf Productions	
2020	Simon Says	Image Comics	
2021	Pulp	Image Comics	
2021	Buried But Not Dead	Source Point Press	
2021	Kent State: Four Dead in Ohio	Abrams Books	
2021	The Loneliness of the Long-Distance Cartoonist	Drawn & Quarterly	
2021	Moms	Drawn & Quarterly	
2022	Did You Hear What Eddie Gein Done?	Albatross Funnybooks	
2022	Ballad for Sophie	Top Shelf Productions	
2022	Blowback	Self-published	
2022	Djeliya	TKO Studios	
2022	Save it for Later: Promises, Parenthood, and the Urgency of Protest	Abrams Books	
2022	This is Where We Fall	Z2	
2023	It's Lonely at the Centre of the Earth	Image Comics	
2023	Chivalry	Dark Horse Comics	
2023	Ducks: Two Years in the Oil Sands	Drawn & Quarterly	
2023	Tokyo Rose—Zero Hour: A Japanese American Woman's Persecution and Ultimate Redemption After World War II	Tuttle Publishing	
2023	Twilight Custard	Ghostpod Publishing	
2024	Monica	Fantagraphics	
2024	Parasocial	Image Comics	
2024	Roaming	Drawn & Quarterly	
2024	Slightly Exaggerated	Dark Horse Comics	
2024	Three Rocks: The Story of Ernie Bushmiller: The Man Who Created Nancy	Abrams ComicArts	
2025	Jane American	Self-published	
2025	Big Jim and the White Boy	Ten Speed Graphic	
2025	The Deep Dark	Scholastic/Graphix	
2025	ERASED: An Actor of Color's Journey Through the Heyday of Hollywood	NBM Graphic Novels	
2025	Homestead	Source Point Press	
2026	Herobear and the Kid Vol. 1	Papercutz	
2026	Black Arms To Hold You Up	Pantheon Books	
2026	The Corus Wave	Avery Hill Publishing	
2026	David Dastmalchian's Through	Z2 Comics	
2026	Do Admit: The Mitford Sisters and Me	Drawn & Quarterly	
2026	Drome	Macmillan – First Second and 23rd Street	
2026	The Ephemerata: Shaping the Exquisite Nature of Grief	Fantagraphics	
2026	Gamemasters: The Comic Book History of Roleplaying Games	Clover Press	

==== Best Anthology ====
Year	Winner	Publisher	Ref
2017	Love is Love	IDW Publishing/DC Comics	
2017	Dark Horse Presents	Dark Horse Comics	
2017	Island	Image Comics	
2017	ReDistrictedComics.com	www.redistrictedcomics.com	
2017	Wonder Woman 75th Anniversary Special	DC Comics	
2018	Mine! A Celebration of Liberty and Freedom for All Benefiting Planned Parenthood	ComicMix	
2018	Magic Bullet	D.C. Conspiracy	
2018	Mirror, Mirror II	2dcloud	
2018	Overwatch: Anthology Volume 1	Dark Horse Comics	
2018	SpongeBob Comics: Treasure Chest	Harry N. Abrams	
2019	Where We Live, A Benefit for the Survivors in Las Vegas	Image Comics	
2019	Action Comics: 80 Years of Superman	DC Comics	
2019	All We Ever Wanted: Stories of a Better World	A Wave Blue World	
2019	Femme Magnifique: 50 Magnificent Women Who Changed the World	Black Crown/IDW Publishing	
2019	Grief	Source Point Press	
2019	Twisted Romance	Image Comics	
2020	Jim Henson's The Storyteller: Sirens	Archaia	
2020	Dead Beats	A Wave Blue World	
2020	Drawing Power	Abrams ComicArts	
2020	Strange Tails	Vices Press	
2020	Thought Bubble 2019	Image Comics	
2021	Be Gay, Do Comics	IDW Publishing	
2021	Hey, Amateur! Go From Novice to Nailing It in 9 Panels	IDW Publishing	
2021	Maybe Someday: Stories of Promise, Visions of Hope	A Wave Blue World	
2021	Pandemix: Quarantine Comix in the Age of ‘Rona	Self-published	
2021	Votes for Women: The Battle for the 19th Amendment	Little Red Bird Press	
2022	DC Pride 2021	DC Comics	
2022	Sensory: Life on the Spectrum	Self-published	
2022	Smut Peddler Presents: Sordid Past	Iron Circus Comics	
2022	You Died: An Anthology of the Afterlife	Iron Circus Comics	
2022	Yule: Dreadful Tales for the Holiday Season	Self-published	
2023	Young Men in Love	A Wave Blue World	
2023	Cthulu Invades Wonderland	Orange Cone Productions	
2023	Lower Your Sights	Mad Cave Studios	
2023	The Silver Coin	Image Comics	
2023	Voices That Count	IDW Publishing	
2024	The Rocketeer One-Shot	IDW Publishing	
2024	The Devil's Cut	DSTLRY	
2024	Dwellings	Oni Press	
2024	Hairology	Lifeline Comics	
2024	Ice Cream Man	Image Comics	
2024	Swan Songs	Image Comics	
2025	Transphoria	Lifeline Comics	
2025	DC Power 2024	DC Comics	
2025	EC Cruel Universe	Oni Press	
2025	Hello Darkness	BOOM! Studios	
2025	The Savage Sword of Conan	Titan Comics	
2025	Tales from the New World	Oscar Osorio	
2026	Bowling with Corpses and Other Strange Tales From Lands Unknown	Dark Horse Comics	
2026	Flash Gordon Adventures Vol. 2	Papercutz	
2026	Jim Henson Presents	BOOM! Studios	
2026	Knapsack Magazine Volume 2: Butter	Lucky Pocket Press	
2026	unSEEN/unHEARD: Disability & Neurodivergence Comic Anthology	self-published	
2026	Young Men in Love: New Romance	A Wave Blue World	

==== Best Humor Comic ====
Year	Winner		Ref
2017	I Hate Fairyland	Image Comics	
2017	Adventures of God	WEBTOON	
2017	Bluechair	WEBTOON	
2017	Giant Days	BOOM! Studios	
2017	Jughead	Archie Comics	
2017	Unbeatable Squirrel Girl	Marvel Comics	
2018	Batman/Elmer Fudd Special	DC Comics	
2018	Baking with Kafka	Drawn & Quarterly	
2018	Boyfriend of the Dead	WEBTOON	
2018	Giant Days	BOOM! Studios	
2018	My Giant Nerd Boyfriend	WEBTOON	
2018	Sh*t My President Says	Top Shelf Productions	
2019	MAD	DC Comics	
2019	Bluechair	WEBTOON	
2019	Get Naked	Image Comics	
2019	Love Advice from the Great Duke of Hell	WEBTOON	
2019	Rick and Morty vs. Dungeons & Dragons	IDW Publishing	
2020	Superman's Pal Jimmy Olsen	DC Comics	
2020	Fangs	Tapas	
2020	The Handbook to Lazy Parenting	Drawn & Quarterly	
2020	Rick & Morty vs. Dungeons & Dragons	IDW Publishing	
2020	Twiztid: Haunted High-Ons	Source Point Press	
2020	Wonder Twins	DC Comics	
2021	Metalshark Bro 2: Assault on Hamzig Island	Scout Comics	
2021	Akissi: Even More Tales of Mischief	Flying Eye Books	
2021	ArkhaManiacs	DC	
2021	Billionaire Island	AHOY Comics	
2021	Love and Capes: The Family Way	Maerkle Press/IDW Publishing	
2021	Moms	Drawn & Quarterly	
2021	Wicked Things	BOOM! Studios	
2022	Not All Robots	AWA Studios	
2022	Cyclopedia Exotica	Drawn & Quarterly	
2022	Love and Capes: In the Time of Covid	Maerkle Press	
2022	Twiztid Haunted High-Ons: Curse of the Green Book	Source Point Press	
2022	Wicked Things	BOOM! Studios	
2023	The Illustrated Al: The Songs of “Weird Al” Yankovic	Z2 Comics	
2023	Breaking Cat News	GoComics	
2023	Crash and Troy	A Wave Blue World	
2023	Grumpy Monkey: Who Threw That?	Random House Children's Books	
2023	Little Tunny's Snail Diaries	Silver Sprocket	
2023	My Bad	AHOY Comics	
2023	Revenge of the Librarians	Drawn & Quarterly	
2023	Whatzit	Heavy Metal	
2024	Bone: More Tall Tales	Scholastic	
2024	Asterix and the White Iris Vol. 40	Papercutz	
2024	Betty & Veronica Friends Forever: Game On #1	Archie Comics	
2024	Dwellings	Oni Press	
2024	Girl Juice	Drawn & Quarterly	
2024	Great British Bump-Off	Dark Horse Comics	
2024	Snow White Zombie Apocalypse	Scout Comics	
2025	Smut #1	Self-published	
2025	Action Philosophers: Omnipotence for Dummies	Rocketship Entertainment	
2025	Archie: The Decision	Archie Comics	
2025	Forces of Nature	Drawn & Quarterly	
2025	Kids Are Still Weird: And More Observations from Parenthood	NBM Graphic Novels	
2025	Space Circus	Dark Horse Comics	
2026	The Goon: Them That Don't Stay Dead	Albatross Funnybooks/Dark Horse Comics	
2026	The Blues Brothers – The Escape of Joliet Jake	Z2 Comics	
2026	Everything Sucks: Kings of Nothing	Silver Sprocket	
2026	How to Survive an Affair	self-published	
2026	Physics for Cats	Drawn & Quarterly	

==== Best Comic Strip or Panel ====
Year	Winner	Author	Publisher	Ref
2017	Bloom County	Berkeley Breathed	Universal Uclick	
2018	Sarah's Scribbles	Sarah Andersen	Andrews McMeel Universal	
2019	Nancy	Olivia Jaimes	Andrews McMeel Universal	
2020	Nancy	Olivia Jaimes	Andrews McMeel Universal	

==== Best Webcomic ====
Year	Winner	Author/Publisher	Ref
2017	The Red Hook	Dean Haspiel	
2017	Girl Genius	Phil and Kaja Foglio	
2017	Siren's Lament	instantmiso	
2017	The Middle Age	Steve Conley	
2017	unOrdinary	uru-chan	
2018	1000	Chuck Brown and Sanford Greene	
2018	I Love Yoo	Quimchee	
2018	The Middle Age	Steve Conley	
2018	Siren's Lament	instantmiso	
2018	War Cry	Dean Haspiel	
2019	The Nib	Various	
2019	Age Matters	Enjelicious	
2019	Aztec Empire	Paul Guinan, Anina Bennett, David Hahn	
2019	The Contradictions	http://www.thecontradictions.com/	
2019	Existential Comics	Corey Mohler	
2019	Lavender Jack	Dan Schkade	
2019	Luff	Arechan	
2019	Nothing Special	Katie Cook	
2020	Fried Rice	Erica Eng	
2020	The Croaking	echorise	
2020	Lore Olympus	Rachel Smythe	
2020	Penny Arcade	Mike Krahulik and Jerry Holkins	
2020	Rocío Diestra	Rocío Diestra	
2020	Stand Still, Stay Silent	Minna Sundberg	
2020	SubZero	Junepurr	
2021	Fangs	Sarah Andersan	
2021	DPS Only	Tapas	
2021	Heart of the City	Go Comics	
2021	Midnight Poppy Land	WEBTOON	
2021	Shiloh	WEBTOON	
2021	Totally Under Control	Insider	
2022	Lore Olympus	Rachel Smythe	
2022	Archie Comics: Big Ethel Energy	WEBTOON	
2022	Batman: Wayne Family Adventures	WEBTOON	
2022	I Escaped a Chinese Internment Camp	Insider	
2022	Let's Play	WEBTOON	
2023	Lore Olympus	Rachel Smythe	
2023	88 Days of Hell: One Ukrainian Man's Experience in the Russian Filtration	Insider	
2023	The All-Nighter	Comixology Originals	
2023	The Guy Upstairs	WEBTOON	
2023	I Love Yoo	WEBTOON	
2023	Offside: I Was a Pro Football Player. I Was Tricked into Going to Qatar	Insider	
2023	You Were My Joker That Night	Anatola Howard	
2024	Lore Olympus	Rachel Smythe	
2024	Countdown to Love	Manta	
2024	The Guy Upstairs	WEBTOON	
2024	Hungry Heart	Tapas	
2024	I'm Dating a Psychopath	WEBTOON	
2024	Nevermore	WEBTOON	
2024	Señorita Cometa	WEBTOON	
2025	Renaissance of Raven	DC Go!/DC Comics	
2025	The Croaking	WEBTOON	
2025	Daughter of a Thousand Faces	Tapas	
2025	The Mafia Nanny	WEBTOON	
2025	Novae	novaecomic.com	
2025	Under the Oak Tree	Manta	
2025	Vampire Family	WEBTOON	
2026	Neon Pantheon	neonpantheoncomic.com	
2026	Battle Mage Farmer	Tapas Entertainment Inc.	
2026	Before We Sail	Aces Weekly	
2026	Daughter of a Thousand Faces	Tapas Entertainment Inc.	
2026	The Mafia Nanny	WEBTOON Entertainment	
2026	Marionetta	WEBTOON Entertainment	

==== Best Humor Webcomic ====
Year	Winner	Publisher	Ref
2021	Sarah's Scribbles	Sarah Andersen	
2021	The Abominable Charles Christopher	karlkerschl.com/abominable/	
2021	Bagel High	instagram.com/yoyorobot/	
2021	Beware of Toddler	bewareoftoddler.com	
2021	Cassandra Comics	Tapas	
2021	Cursed Princess Club	WEBTOON	
2021	The Middle Age	steveconley.com/the-middle-age/	
2021	xkcd	xkcd.com	
2022	Sarah's Scribbles	Sarah Andersen	
2022	The Little Trashmaid	Tapas Media	
2022	Love Advice from the Great Duke of Hell	WEBTOON	
2022	The Middle Age	middleagecomic.com	
2022	Mr. Lovenstein	Tapas Media	
2022	Rosebuds	GoComics	
2023	Evil Inc.	evil-inc.com	
2023	Background Noise	backgroundnoisecomic.com	
2023	Finding Fiends	WEBTOON	
2023	Live with Yourself!	WEBTOON	
2023	Vampire Husband	WEBTOON	
2024	Blue Chair	WEBTOON	
2024	Beetle Moses	Comics Kingdom	
2024	The Deviless's Impression of a Princess	Manta	
2024	The Fantastical After-School Writing Club	Manta	
2024	Not So Shoujo Love Story	WEBTOON	
2024	Vibe Check!	WEBTOON	
2025	Nothing Butt Nightwing	DC Go!/DC Comics	
2025	Dealing with Demons	Manta	
2025	Harley Quinn in Paradise	DC Go!/DC Comics	
2025	High Class Homos	WEBTOON Entertainment	
2025	Rosebuds	Comics Kingdom	
2025	Wanna Be Friends?	WEBTOON Entertainment	
2026	Nothing Butt Nightwing	DC Comics / DC Go!	
2026	The Bathroom Ghost	WEBTOON Entertainment	
2026	Evil Inc.	evil-inc.com	
2026	Harley Quinn in Paradise	DC Comics / DC Go!	
2026	I Am The Chief	iamthechiefcat.com	
2026	My Little Warlord	DC Comics / DC Go!	
2026	Taste of Justice	DC Comics / DC Go!	

==== Best Non-fiction Comic Work ====
Year	Winner	Publisher	Ref
2017	March: Book III	Top Shelf Productions	
2017	Cooking Comically	www.cookingcomically.com	
2017	Dark Night, A True Batman Story	DC Comics	
2017	ReDistrictedComics	redistrictedcomics.com	
2017	Rolling Blackouts	Drawn and Quarterly	
2017	Tetris: The Games People Play	First Second	
2018	The Best We Could Do	Abrams ComicArts	
2018	Everything is Flammable	Uncivilized Books	
2018	Going into Town: A Love Letter to New York	Bloomsbury Publishing	
2018	Hostage	Drawn & Quarterly	
2018	Poppies of Iraq	Drawn & Quarterly	
2018	ReDistrictedComics	redistrictedcomics.com	
2018	Spinning	First Second	
2019	Where We Live, A Benefit for the Survivors in Las Vegas	Image Comics	
2019	All the Answers	Simon & Schuster	
2019	The Bridge: How the Roeblings Connected Brooklyn to New York	Abrams ComicArts	
2019	Hey, Kiddo	Graphix	
2019	I Moved to Los Angeles to Work in Animation	BOOM! Studios	
2019	Let's Make Comics!	Watson-Guptill	
2020	They Called Us Enemy	IDW Publishing	
2020	Coin-Op Carnival	coinopcarnival.com	
2020	Grass	Drawn & Quarterly	
2020	In Waves	Nobrow/Flying Eye Books	
2020	The Twilight Man	Humanoids	
2021	Kent State: Four Dead in Ohio	Abrams Books	
2021	Banned Book Club	Iron Circus Comics	
2021	Chasin' the Bird: Charlie Parker In California	Z2 Comics	
2021	Come Home Indio	Street Noise Books	
2021	Dancing After TEN	Fantagraphics Books	
2021	Grateful Dead – Origins	Z2 Comics	
2021	We'll Soon Be Home Again	Dark Horse Comics	
2022	Did You Hear What Eddie Gein Done?	Albatross Funnybooks	
2022	The Comic Book History of Animation	IDW Publishing	
2022	Elvis: The Official Graphic Novel	Z2	
2022	Hakim's Odyssey, Book 1: From Syria to Turkey	Graphic Mundi	
2022	Run: Book One	Abrams Books	
2022	Yummy: A History of Desserts	Random House Children's Books	
2023	Ducks: Two Years in the Oil Sands	Drawn & Quarterly	
2023	88 Days of Hell: One Ukrainian Man's Experience in the Russian Filtration	Insider	
2023	A Game for Swallows Expanded Edition	Graphic Universe – Lerner Publishing Group	
2023	I'm Still Alive	Archaia – BOOM! Studios	
2023	Just Another Meat-Eating Dirtbag	Street Noise Books	
2023	Radium Girls	Iron Circus Comics	
2023	The Third Person	Drawn & Quarterly	
2024	Miles Davis and the Search for the Sound	Z2 Comics	
2024	Funny Things: A Comic Strip Biography of Charles M. Schulz	Top Shelf Productions	
2024	Memento Mori	Oni Press	
2024	My Picture Diary	Drawn & Quarterly	
2024	The Odyssey of the Adriana	Business Insider	
2024	Tasty	Random House Children's Books	
2025	In the Shadows of Stalin: The Story of Mr. Jones	Oni Press	
2025	Adrift on a Painted Sea	Avery Hill	
2025	Brittle Joints	Street Noise Books	
2025	Djuna	Street Noise Books	
2025	Feeding Ghosts	MCD	
2026	Surrounded: America's First School for Black Girls, 1832	Ablaze Publishing/NBM Graphic Novels	
2026	Fela: Music is the Weapon	Amistad	
2026	Ginseng Roots	Pantheon Books	
2026	Love Letters Every Day	Background Noise	
2026	Lucas Wars	23rd Street Books	
2026	Muybridge	Drawn & Quarterly	

==== Best Kids Comic or Graphic Novel ====
Year	Winner	Publisher	Ref
2018	DC SuperHero Girls	DC Comics	
2018	Bolivar	Archaia/BOOM! Studios	
2018	Cyko KO: A Comic Book Adventure You Can Color	Alterna Comics	
2018	Dog Man: A Tale of Two Kitties	Graphix	
2018	Home Time (Book One)	Top Shelf Productions	
2018	If Found…Please Return To Elise Gravel	Drawn & Quarterly	
2018	Jem and the Holograms	IDW Publishing	
2018	Pizza Tree	Arcana Comics	
2018	Red's Planet: Friends and Foes	Harry N. Abrams	
2019	Punk Taco	Adam Wallenta Entertainment	
2019	Aquicorn Cove	Oni Press	
2019	Be Prepared	First Second Books	
2019	Jupiter Jet	Action Lab Entertainment	
2019	The Nameless City: The Divided Earth	First Second Books	
2019	The Prince and the Dressmaker	First Second Books	
2020	Guts	Graphix/Scholastic	
2020	Dog Man: For Whom the Ball Rolls	Graphix/Scholastic	
2020	New Kid	Harper Collins	
2020	Science! The Elements of Dark Energy	Bedside Press	
2020	The Underfoot: The Mighty Deep	Lion Forge	
2021	Twins	Graphix/Scholastic	
2021	Akissi: Even More Tales of Mischief	Flying Eye Books	
2021	Cat Kid Comic Club #1	Scholastic Graphix	
2021	Jupiter Jet and the Forgotten Radio	Action Lab Entertainment	
2021	Max Meow: Cat Crusader	Random House	
2021	The Perhapanauts: First Blood	Black Caravan/Scout Comics	
2022	Avatar: The Last Airbender–Suki, Alone	Dark Horse Comics	
2022	Better Place	Top Shelf Productions	
2022	Just Roll With It	Random House Children's Books	
2022	Nobody Likes You	Fantagraphics	
2022	Rainbow Bridge	AfterShock Comics	
2022	The Underfoot: Into the Sun	Oni Press	
2023	Jonna and the Unpossible Monsters	Oni Press	
2023	The Aquanaut	Scholastic Graphix	
2023	Frizzy	First Second Books	
2023	The Ghoul Agency	Action Lab Entertainment	
2023	Kaya	Image Comics	
2023	PAWS: Gabby Gets It Together	Razorbill Books, Penguin Random House	
2023	Punk Taco 2	Adam Wallenta Entertainment	
2023	Tin Man	Tin Man, Abrams ComicArts	
2024	The Batman Scooby-Doo Mysteries	DC Comics	
2024	Archie Horror Presents…Chilling Adventures	Archie Comic Publications, Inc.	
2024	Big Ethel Energy Vol. 2	Archie Comic Publications, Inc.	
2024	Brownstone's Mythical Collection: Luna and the Treasure of Tlaloc	Flying Eye Books/Nobrow	
2024	Dear Rosie	Random House Children's Books	
2024	The Glopple	Legends Comics	
2024	Lights	Oni Press	
2024	Squish and Squash	Keenspot Entertainment	
2025	Hilda and Twig Hide from the Rain	Flying Eye Books	
2025	Double Booking	Papercutz/Mad Cave Studios	
2025	Dudley Datson and the Forever Machine	Dark Horse Comics	
2025	The Legend of Tiger and Tail-Flower	Levine Querido	
2025	The New Girl	Scholastic/Graphix	
2025	Night Stories	Astra Books for Young Readers	
2025	ZOR	Keenspot Entertainment	

==== Best Kids Comic or Graphic Novel – Ages 11 and Under ====
Year	Winner		Publisher	Ref
2026	Walt Disney's Mickey Mouse and the Amazing Lost Ocean	Denis-Pierre Filippi and Silvio Camboni; translation by Jonathan Gray	Fantagraphics	
2026	Brume Vol. 1: The Dragon Awakens	Jérôme Pélissier and Carine Hinder	Hippo Park/Astra Books for Young Readers	
2026	The Fire Breathing Duckling	Frank Cammuso	Toon Books/Astra Books for Young Readers	
2026	The Lost Sunday	Ileana Surducan	Oni Press	
2026	Magda, Intergalactic Chef, vol 1: The Big Tournament	Nicolas Wouters and Mathilde Van Gheluwe; translated by Ann Marie Boulanger	Graphic Universe/Lerner Publishing Group	
2026	Max, A Little Axolotl	Joey Spiotto	Graphix/Scholastics Inc.	
2026	The Mighty Bite #3: Hog Rocket Ruckus	Nathan Hale	Amulet Books/ABRAMS	
2026	The Patchwork Girl of Oz Volume 1	Otis Frampton	Image Comics	

==== Best Kids Comic or Graphic Novel – Ages 12 and Up ====
Year	Winner	Author	Publisher	Ref
2026	Raised by Ghosts	Briana Loewinsohn	Fantagraphics	
2026	Angelica and the Bear Prince	Trung Le Nguyen	Archaia/BOOM! Studios	
2026	Dracula's Brunch Club	Brian Gonsar and Keenan Gaybba	Oni Press	
2026	Hello Sunshine	Keezy Young	Little, Brown Books for Young Readers	
2026	Hunger's Bite	Taylor Robin	Union Square & Co.	
2026	Wynd Book Four: The Power of the Blood	James Tynion IV and Michael Dialynas	BOOM! Studios	

==== Best Presentation in Design ====
Year	Winner	Publisher	Ref
2017	Mike Mignola's Screw-On Head and Other Curious Objects: Artist's Edition Hardcover	IDW Publishing	
2018	Saga	Image Comics	
2019	Absolute Sandman Overture	DC Comics	
2020	Stan Sakai's Usagi Yojimbo: The Complete Grasscutter Artist Select	IDW Publishing	
2021	Dave Cockrum's X-Men Artifact Edition	IDW Publishing	
2021	Crescent City Monsters	Dream Fury Comics	
2021	Electric Black	Black Caravan/Scout	
2021	The Harrowing of Hell	Iron Circus Comics	
2021	Heavy Metal #300	Heavy Metal	
2021	Impossible Jones, Volume 1: Grin & Gritty	Panic Button Press	
2021	Marcy and the Riddle of the Sphinx	Flying Eye Books	
2022	Did You Hear What Eddie Gein Done?	Albatross Funnybooks	
2022	EC Covers Artist's Edition	IDW Publishing	
2022	Friday Foster: The Ultimate Collection	ABLAZE Comics	
2022	Jim Lee's X-Men Artist's Edition	IDW Publishing	
2022	Locke & Key: Keyhouse Compendium	IDW Publishing	
2022	Stake	Scout Comics	
2023	Richard Stark's Parker: The Martini Edition—Last Call	IDW Publishing	
2023	Beneath an Alien Sky	Rocketship Entertainment	
2023	Best of EC Stories Artisan Edition	IDW Publishing	
2023	Ronan and the Endless Sea of Stars	Abrams ComicArts	
2023	Sara Deluxe Hardcover	TKO Studios	
2024	Richard Stark's Parker: The Complete Collection	IDW Publishing	
2024	Complete Klaus Deluxe Edition	BOOM! Studios	
2024	Faithless Deluxe Edition with Slipcase	BOOM! Studios	
2024	Grendel: Devil by the Deed–Master's Edition	Dark Horse Comics	
2024	Metaphorical HER	Rocketship Entertainment	
2024	Palookaville 24	Drawn & Quarterly	
2024	Thalamus: The Art of Dave McKean	Dark Horse Comics	
2024	Watership Down	Ten Speed Press	
2025	Batman Year One Artist's Edition	IDW Publishing	
2025	Coins of Judas	Orange Cone Productions/Band of Bards	
2025	Mary Shelley's Frankenstein starring Boris Karloff and Bram Stoker's Dracula starring Bela Lugosi Casket Edition	Rocketship Entertainment and Legendary Comics	
2025	One Bite at a Time: The First 20 Years of Elephant Eater Comics	Elephant Eater Comics	
2025	Scott Pilgrim 20th Anniversary Hardcover Box Set	Oni Press	
2025	Warm Fusion	DSTLRY	

== See also ==
Other comic-related awards given at the Baltimore Comic-Con:

- Dick Giordano Humanitarian of the Year Award (2010–present)
- Harvey Awards (2006–2016)
- Hero Initiative Lifetime Achievement Award (2006–present)
