= Not So Shoujo Love Story =

2020 yuri webtoon

- volume 1 cover
- Author: Curryuku
- Website: WEBTOON
- Launch date: September 8, 2020
- Publisher(s): WEBTOON; Viz Media
- Genre(s): comedy, girls' love
- Rating: 9.76 Stars on WEBTOON

Not So Shoujo Love Story is a romantic comedy yuri webtoon created by artist Curryuku. It follows the comedic love triangle between high schooler students Rei, Hanna and Hansum. It began publishing weekly on the Webtoon platform in 2020. According to data from Webtoon, it had received 73 million views by the end of 2024.

== Plot ==
Despite her reputation as a school delinquent, Rei is actually a romance-super-fan, having read many of shoujo romance manga, and now she wants to live out a romance just like the ones she's read by winning the affections of the most handsome boy in school, Hansum Ochinchin. However, her plans are quickly derailed when her main rival for Hansum's affections, Hanna Schulerin, suddenly confesses her feelings for Rei instead.

== Publication ==
Not So Shoujo Love Story is created by artist Curryuku. It was first self-published on the Webtoon Canvas platform from May 6, 2018, to August 22, 2019. In December 2019 it was announced that the series would be moving to the Webtoon Originals platform. It began publishing on the Webtoon Originals platform in September 2020, and started its second season in February 2023. It is published weekly, though had a hiatus between seasons.

In October 2023 it was first announced that Viz Media would be publishing print volumes of the series under their Viz Originals imprint.

In May 2024, Episode 121 of the series on Webtoon Originals was published as the finale of Season 2. At the end of the episode, Curryuku announced an indefinite hiatus, which is still in effect.

No.	Release date	ISBN
1	May 13, 2025	978-1-9747-4722-1
Chapters 1–15
2	August 12, 2025	978-1-9747-5612-4
Chapters 16–32
3	February 10, 2026	978-1-9747-6216-3
Chapters 33–47
4	September 15, 2026	978-1-9747-1698-2
Chapters 48–62

== Reception ==
In 2024, Not So Shoujo Love Story was nominated a Ringo Award in the "Best Humor Webcomic" category.

Burkely Hermann of The Geekiary has praised for the series for its compelling characters and storytelling, while noting of that art "reminds me of the beautiful animation and art in Kageki Shoujo! or the scenes in Cardcaptor Sakura, both of which are just as colorful and full of life as this webcomic."
