= Love Advice from the Great Duke of Hell =

Webcomic by unfins

- Author: unfins
- Website: Love Advice from the Great Duke of Hell on Webtoon
- Current status/schedule: Completed
- Launch date: December 18, 2018
- Publisher(s): Webtoon, Webtoon Unscrolled
- Genre: Comedy
- Original language: English

Love Advice from the Great Duke of Hell is a comedic fantasy webcomic by unfins. It was published on Webtoon from 2018 to 2022 and has been published in print by Webtoon Unscrolled since 2024.

== Plot ==
Paul, a teenage boy, summons the Great Duke Astaroth from Hell to help him make his crush fall in love with him in return for Paul giving him his soul in six days.

== Publication ==
=== Digital ===
The series was originally self-published on the Webtoon platform before being picked up as a Webtoon Original after winning a contest. A Spanish language translation has been published.

=== Print ===
In 2023, it was announced that the series would be adapted in seven print volumes by Webtoon Unscrolled.

Volume	Date	ISBN
1	November 5, 2024	ISBN 1998854868

== Reception ==
Publishers Weekly dubbed the first print volume "energetic if ungainly", criticizing the large number of subplots. C. M. Ramsburg of Comic Book Resources gave the first print volume a largely negative review, rating the series as 4 out of 10, disliking the humor, chapter breaks, and plotline, though she liked the lettering and Astaroth's character design.

The series was nominated for the 2019 Ringo Award for Best Humor Comic. It also received a nomination for the 2022 Ringo Award for Best Humor Webcomic.

== Film adaption ==
A live-action film adaption of the comic, to be produced by Imagine Entertainment in collaboration with Wattpad Webtoon Studios, was announced in 2023.
