= Shen (cartoonist) =

American cartoonist

- Shen's avatar
- Born: Andrew Tsyaston; February 1, 1992 (age 34)
- Pseudonym: Shenanigansen
- Notable works: Owl Turd, Shen Comix, Bluechair, Live with Yourself!

Andrew Tsyaston (born February 1, 1992), better known by his pen names Shen or Shenanigansen, is an American cartoonist and the creator of the comic series Owlturd, Shen Comix, and Bluechair, and the co-creator of Live with Yourself!. Shen Comix has 1.8 million followers on Instagram while Bluechair has 1.4 million subscribers on Webtoon.

== Names and background ==
Shen emigrated from Europe to the United States with his family in 1999.

In his cartooning career, Shen has gone both by Shen and by Shenanigansen, though his latest works use the name Shen. For example, as of 2021, he had two ongoing comics on Webtoon with the author credit Shen, and two comics that were not updating with the author credit Shenanigansen. The book Emotions Explained with Buff Dudes, a collection of Owl Turd comics, was credited to Andrew Tsyaston.

Mitch Knox of The Music wrote that Shen was "an infamous name among certain cyber circles, having cut his trolling teeth upon the unsuspecting user-base of British indie game developer Facepunch's forums". Shen has worked as a web developer, and said that he liked to keep his comic persona separate from his "real life identity". Shen described himself as a millennial in an interview.

Shen said in a 2019 interview that he was primarily inspired to make comics by a webcomic artist named Ronnie Filyaw, the creator of Whomp! In an interview with Bustle magazine, Shen said that a lot of his comics are inspired by personal experiences, and that he will try to identify "a glimpse of humor" from stressful or bad days. Shen said that he purposely tries to make his comics more general, so that people can draw their own conclusions and apply them to a host of different situations. He said that the purpose of his comics is to remind people that their emotions, however strong or seemingly unusual they may be, are all very human and natural.

== Works ==
=== Owl Turd Comix and Shen Comix ===
Owl Turd Comix (sometimes called Owl Turd Comics or just Owl Turd) began in 2013. As of 2016, Shen was posting comics to Owl Turd almost daily, and said that each comic took between two and six hours to complete.

Selected Owl Turd comics were collected into a 111-page book, Emotions Explained with Buff Dudes, which was published by Andrews McMeel in 2018.

As of 2026, the website owlturd.com redirects to the Instagram page "Shen Comix", where the comic continues. Shen Comix stopped updating on Webtoon in January 2019, and resumed in January 2025.

=== Bluechair ===
Bluechair began in 2014 on the webcomics publishing portal Webtoon, and was announced in 2026 to be concluding with its 1250th episode on the platform by the author. Bluechair comics are presented through the fourth wall by the author's cartoon self and do not have a narrative. The series won the 2024 Ringo Award for Best Humor Webcomic.

=== Live with Yourself! ===
In Live with Yourself! Todd, a computer support worker, becomes split into four versions of himself from different times. Todd finds himself living with Tomo, the not-too-distant future of Todd; Oldie, a much older incarnation; and Babs, his baby self. As described by a reviewer, "there's a lesson amidst the sight gags and silliness. Future versions of yourself are warnings, and maybe if Todd pays attention, he'll eat better, sleep better, and have some motivation in life. Hey, he might even put himself out there for a partner!" Live with Yourself was previously both written and illustrated by Shen, before the illustration work was taken over by David J. Catman in 2019. Catman became the official writer in 2020. The comic was updated once a week.

=== Other works ===
Shen posted a horror comic on Webtoon called Eden, which ran for four episodes. According to a self-written biography, Shen has also created comics for CollegeHumor and The Daily Dot. Among this, a comedy series called Public U. art club! was started by Shen in 2023.

During the 2025 NFL season, Shen partnered with the Seattle Seahawks to draw illustrations that were posted by the team's social media accounts following wins. Such images included parodies of works like Street Fighter and Umamusume: Pretty Derby. While Shen was not an American football fan, the Seahawks wanted an artist unfamiliar with the sport who could create content that was different from other teams.

== Reception ==
=== Readership figures ===
As of March 2021, Instagram reported that Shen Comix had 2 million followers. At the same time, Webtoon reported that Bluechair had 1.2 million subscribers and Live with Yourself had over 500,000 subscribers; while Shen Comix no longer updated on Webtoon it had received 5.9 million total views through that service.

=== Reviews ===
Writing for The Beat in 2017, Heidi MacDonald said of Owl Turd and Bluechair that "Shen's subjects are the usual: internet memes, self-doubt, cats." Also for The Beat, columnist Deanna Destito reviewed Live with Yourself in 2021 and said it offers a funny look at what it is like to deal with your own nonsense. Website TheMusic.com.au included Owl Turd Comix in a list of "10 Webcomics to Add to Your Week" in 2013, calling it "darkly tinged, brutally honest and skeweringly sharp". The Bangladesh newspaper The Daily Star said in 2017 that Owl Turd Comix "drops truth bombs", "is witty and absurd", and said, "Reading it, you will be amazed at how Shen effortlessly articulates his unique experiences and inner realisations hilariously in just a few panels."

Claire Napier reviewed Bluechair for Women Write About Comics in 2020. She said of the art, "Shen's lines are nice, full of motion, well reduced cartooning, made with a pleasing, uneven digital brush" and said that the visuals have developed a long way since it started. Napier compared Bluechair to "a 2000s strip-based man-on-sofa webcomic" but said that it apparently has a "total lack of bad will towards anyone... the character Shen never seems like a dreadful wanker. This is because Shen infuses his avatar's apparent sense of self-ignorance, or lack of definition, with a basic acceptance that feels like it's there because the creator has a code of ethics... There are Bluechair jokes about his incompatibility with various symbols of trad or aggressive masculinity, but they always swerve away from 'and that means I'm bad, which makes me good because I know it, heheh, give me my man trophy anyway' to the implication of a big shrug." Napier concluded that "This isn't the type of strip I need any more, but it's clearly serving a purpose and looks like a pretty good, influencer-responsible place for kids to get laughs."

Specific strips and stories have received positive reviews. A reviewer for io9 said that "We Go Forward", a story which appeared on Owl Turd, "left us with an unexpected lump in our throats... [the comic] is set in a side-scrolling video game and deals with the protagonist's poignant solution to the problem of not being able to make an in-game jump and not being able to move backwards through the game." A short film based on "We Go Forward" was praised by writers for The Huffington Post and playgroundmag.net. Shen noted that several readers took the strip as a metaphor for immigration. Bustle magazine wrote an article on one five-panel Owl Turd comic about mental health, saying that the comic resonated strongly with many people dealing with emotions that are difficult to have out in the open, and adding, "What's great about Shen's comic is that even though the illustrations themselves use simple concepts and designs, they represent much more complicated everyday situations where we're just expected to go with the flow — both external events and internal struggles."
