= Instantmiso =

American comics creator

Kaitlyn Narvaza, better known as instantmiso (written only with lowercase letters), is an American comics creator, born in San Diego, California. She is of Filipino ancestry.

instantmiso is a WEBTOON original creator who has been on the platform since 2015, when she launched the webcomic Where Tangents Meet. After this one, she published Siren's Lament, which launched in 2016 with great success, accruing more than 430 million views. She followed Siren's Lament with Eaternal Nocturnal, which launched in 2021 and she is currently working on a comic called Fae Trapped, which was launched in 2025.

In 2017, instantmiso won Ringo Awards for Fan Favorite New Talent.

== Awards and nominations ==
Year	Award	Category	Nominee	Result	Ref
2017	Ringo Awards	Fan Favorite New Talent		Won	
2017	Ringo Awards	Best Webcomic	Siren's Lament	Nominated	
2018	Ringo Awards	Best Webcomic	Siren's Lament	Nominated	
