= The Mafia Nanny =

Webtoon by Violet Matter

- Author: Violet Matter
- Illustrator: Shoo
- Launch date: November 23, 2023.
- Publisher: Webtoon
- Genre(s): Crime fiction, Romantic comedy

The Mafia Nanny is a webtoon written by Violet Matter and illustrated by Shoo. It has been published digitally on Webtoon since November 2023, and in print since 2025 by Webtoon Unscrolled.

== Plot ==
The plot centers around Davina Diavolo, a graduate of the Elite Nanny Academy, as she is tasked with taking care of Mikey Angelini, the 4-year-old son of the Venetian underboss Gabriel Angelini.

== Development ==
Author Violet Matter had previously written another webtoon, Forever After. She credits her own nanny job in London as inspiration for the comic.

== Publication ==
The publication of the webtoon is done by Webtoon Unscrolled.

No.	Original release date	Original ISBN	English release date	English ISBN
1	February 4, 2025	1998341208		
2	October 28, 2025	1998341364		
3	August 4, 2026	1834110483		
4	May 27, 2027	1834110874		

== Adaptation ==
In September 2026, it was announced that an adaptation of The Mafia Nanny created by 20th Century Studios will air on Hulu, with Charlize Theron acting as executive producer.

== Reception ==
Screen Rant listed The Mafia Nanny as one of the best new manhwa of 2023. Hilary Leung of Comics Beat gave it a positive review, praising the found family elements. A separate review on K-Comics Beat, an outlet of Comics Beat, positively commented on the "eye-catching" character designs and compared the series to Spy x Family. As of September 2026, it has more than 400 million views.

Awards/honors
Year	Award	Result	Reference
2025	Harvey Award for Digital Book of the Year	Shortlisted	
2025	Ringo Award for Best Webcomic	Shortlisted	
2026	Ringo Award for Best Webcomic	Shortlisted	
