= I Think I Turned My Childhood Friend into a Girl =

Japanese manga series

- Japanese cover for Volume 1, depicting Kenshiro Mido (left) and Hiura Mihate

恋する(おとめ)の作り方 (Koisuru (Otome) no Tsukurikata)
- Genre: Romantic comedy
- Manga
- Written by: Azusa Banjo
- Published by: Ichijinsha
- English publisher: NA: Seven Seas Entertainment
- Magazine: Comic Pool
- Original run: December 26, 2019 – present
- Volumes: 12
- Anime television series

I Think I Turned My Childhood Friend into a Girl (Japanese: 恋する(おとめ)の作り方, Hepburn: Koisuru (Otome) no Tsukurikata; lit. "How to Make a 'Girl' Fall in Love") is an otokonoko romantic comedy manga series by Azusa Banjo, published by Ichijinsha in Comic Pool and in collected tankōbon volumes. It was originally released through Banjo's Twitter account starting on December 26, 2019, as Osananajimi (♂) o Onnanoko ni Shiteshimatta Hanashi, (Note: Osananajimi (♂) o Onnanoko ni Shiteshimatta Hanashi (幼馴染（♂）を女の子にしてしまった話; "I Turned My Childhood Friend (♂) Into a Girl")) and was picked up for serialization due to positive reader response. An English translation has been released by Seven Seas Entertainment since June 2022. An anime television series adaptation has been announced.

The series follows Kenshiro Mido, who practices applying make-up on his friend Hiura Mihate; following this, Hiura becomes interested in presenting femininely, and the two realize they are attracted to each other. The series, and the character of Hiura in particular, has been well received by critics and readers. It was nominated for the Next Manga Award in 2020, 2021, and 2022, and was voted one of the most popular web manga of 2020.

== Premise ==
I Think I Turned My Childhood Friend into a Girl is an otokonoko romantic comedy manga that follows Kenshiro Mido, a young man with an interest in cosmetics, who wants someone to practice applying make-up on other than his sisters. After Kenshiro's childhood friend Hiura Mihate agrees to let Kenshiro practice on him, Kenshiro finds himself attracted to Hiura's new, feminine appearance. Hiura starts to enjoy presenting himself femininely, taking an interest in make-up and women's fashion and cross-dressing regularly; he also begins to find Kenshiro attractive.

== Production ==
Prior to writing I Think I Turned My Childhood Friend into a Girl, Azusa Banjo liked characters who defy gender roles, such as otokonoko, cross-dressing women, and women using the boyish pronoun boku, and had debuted as a manga creator with an otokonoko story. Because of this interest, she decided to create a romantic story about a feminine male character who is shy and a little clumsy. She also introduced make-up elements to the story to make someone other than the otokonoko character the catalyst for the transformation. When designing Hiura, she started with how he looks while wearing women's clothes, and then created a pre-makeover design based on that. She wanted the two designs to contrast, but still wanted Hiura to look cute before the makeover to ensure people would continue reading past the first few pages. She based his name on "Pyrrha" (ピュラー, Pyurā), the name used by Achilles in his early years when cross-dressing. While considering Hiura's cuteness an important aspect of the series, she also wanted to give a positive portrayal of male friendships, and put effort into making Hiura and Kenshiro come across as childhood friends. When researching the series, Banjo makes use of Instagram and fashion magazines for young people; the latter in particular for the sake of realism, as it is what Kenshiro would read.

== Media ==
=== Manga ===
Written and illustrated by Azusa Banjo, I Think I Turned My Childhood Friend into a Girl was originally published as a web comic through Banjo's Twitter account under the title Osananajimi (♂) o Onnanoko ni Shiteshimatta Hanashi, starting on December 26, 2019. Banjo had originally considered self-publishing a print collection of the series but managed to get it picked up for serialization in Comic Pool, starting on February 21, 2020, due to strong positive response from her readers, with the Twitter upload receiving over 120,000 likes by January 2020. The series is also collected in tankōbon print volumes, published by Ichijinsha since September 11, 2020. The first volume was promoted with a trailer in which Kenshiro and Mihate are voiced by Yūki Ono and Yūki Kuwahara, respectively. The manga has been released in English by Seven Seas Entertainment since June 2022, and in Chinese by the Chingwin Publishing Group since September 2022.

==== Volumes ====
No.	Original release date	Original ISBN	English release date	English ISBN
1	September 11, 2020	978-4-7580-2153-1	May 31, 2022 (digital); June 7, 2022 (print)	978-1-64827-884-6
Episode 0, part 1–5; Episode 1, part 1–3; Episode 2, part 1–3; extra; Episode 3, part 1–2; Episode 4, part 1–2; Episode 5, part 1–7; Special 1–4
2	April 16, 2021	978-4-7580-2231-6	February 21, 2023	978-1-63858-659-3
Episode 6, part 1–2; Episode 7–15; Special 1; Special 2, part 1–2; Special 3
3	October 25, 2021	978-4-7580-2303-0	June 27, 2023	978-1-63858-967-9
4	April 22, 2022	978-4-7580-2384-9	October 17, 2023	978-1-68579-569-6
5	October 25, 2022	978-4-7580-2458-7	February 20, 2024	979-8-88843-358-4
6	April 25, 2023	978-4-7580-2514-0	June 11, 2024	979-8-88843-779-7
7	October 25, 2023	978-4-7580-2601-7; 978-4-7580-2603-1 (SE)	October 15, 2024	979-8-89160-501-5
8	April 25, 2024	978-4-7580-2692-5	March 4, 2025	979-8-89373-145-3
9	December 25, 2024	978-4-7580-2805-9; 978-4-7580-2806-6 (SE)	September 23, 2025	979-8-89561-683-3
10	June 3, 2025	978-4-7580-2906-3	March 24, 2026	979-8-89765-210-5
11	November 25, 2025	978-4-7580-2996-4	November 17, 2026	979-8-89863-192-5
12	June 25, 2026	978-4-7580-9952-3	—	—

=== Anime ===
An anime television series adaptation was announced on June 22, 2026.

== Reception ==
I Think I Turned My Childhood Friend into a Girl was well received by readers and critics, who liked Hiura and found him cute; Biglobe News commented that he was so cute that one could forget that he is not a girl. Excite News liked the way Hiura shyly expresses interest in cosmetics and his attraction to Kenshiro. It was nominated for the annual Next Manga Award for best new web manga in 2020, 2021, and 2022. It was among the most popular new romance manga of the first half of 2020 serialized on Pixiv, in a survey where the vast majority of readers were women and aged 18–34. In the 2020 edition of Nippon Shuppan Hanbai's annual "Web Manga General Election" poll, where 813,000 people voted for their favorite web manga, I Think I Turned My Childhood Friend into a Girl was voted the 7th most popular, and it was among the top five series in the 2022 Denshi Comic award, in the category for web manga targeted at male readers. Manga editor Kaito Suzuki named the series as his recommended manga of 2021, appreciating it for its portrayal of love regardless of gender. It ranked fourth on AnimeJapan's "Most Wanted Anime Adaptation" poll in 2024.

The English release of Volume 1 was criticized for portraying Hiura – a feminine male character in the original – as a trans woman; Seven Seas Entertainment responded by revising this for future volumes and for reprints of Volume 1.
