= Kuchibeta Shokudō =

Japanese manga series

- First tankōbon volume cover

くちべた食堂
- Genre: Cooking; Romantic comedy; Yuri
- Manga
- Written by: Bonkara
- Published by: Enterbrain
- Imprint: Beam Comix
- Original run: February 15, 2019 – present
- Volumes: 7

Kuchibeta Shokudō (くちべた食堂) is a Japanese manga series written and illustrated by Bonkara. It began serialization on the author's Twitter account in February 2019, with its volumes released in print by Enterbrain.

== Plot ==
The series is centered around a clerk and their customer. Kuchinashi is a clerk at the restaurant Kuchinashi, and Yanagi is her customer. The two have a strong desire to communicate with each other due to their shared admiration for each other.

== Characters ==
Kuchinashi-san (くちなしさん) / Clerk (店員さん, Tennin-san)
Voiced by: Saori Hayami (voice comic)
Yanagi-san (ヤナギさん) / Customer (お客さん, Ogyaku-san)
Voiced by: Ayane Sakura (voice comic)

== Media ==
=== Manga ===
Written and illustrated by Bonkara, Kuchibeta Shokudō began serialization on the author's Twitter account on February 15, 2019. The series' chapters have been collected by Enterbrain into seven tankōbon volumes as of July 2026.

No.	Release date	ISBN
1	December 10, 2021	978-4-04-736836-1
2	August 12, 2022	978-4-04-737100-2
3	April 12, 2023	978-4-04-737395-2
4	April 12, 2024	978-4-04-737878-0
5	December 12, 2024	978-4-04-738188-9
6	September 12, 2025	978-4-04-738490-3
7	July 10, 2026	978-4-04-500156-7

=== Other ===
A voice comic adaptation was uploaded to the Comic Beam YouTube channel on March 29, 2022. It featured the voice performances of Saori Hayami and Ayane Sakura. Another voice comic was uploaded to the same channel on December 12, 2024, in commemoration of the fifth volume's release that same day. It featured Hayami and Sakura reprising their roles.

== Reception ==
By September 2025, the series had over 360,000 copies in circulation.

The series was nominated for the eighth Next Manga Awards in 2022 in the web category and was ranked 19th. The series was nominated for the ninth edition of the same award in 2023 in the same category and was ranked 11th.
