= Jeff Edwards =

American writer

- Born: 1959 (age 66–67); Savannah, Georgia, U.S.
- Occupation: Author
- Writing career
- Genre: Military thriller
- Website: www.jeffedwardswrites.com

Jeff Edwards (born 1959) is an American author of bestselling military thrillers.

He has published articles and opinion columns, mostly on Military.com and military newspapers. The majority of his published work, fiction and non-fiction pertains to the U.S. military. Collectively, his novels have won the Admiral Nimitz Award for Outstanding Naval Fiction from the Military Writers Society of America, the American Author Medal from the American Author's Association, the Clive Cussler Grandmaster Award for Adventure Writing, the Reader's Choice Award, and the Silver Medal for Military/Wartime Fiction from the Independent Publishers of America.

Edwards was born and raised in Savannah, Georgia. Following a 23-year career as a sonar technician, he retired from the United States Navy as a chief petty officer. He now resides in San Diego, California, where he writes military novels and opinion columns and works as a consultant to the military.

== Bibliography ==
=== The Sea Warrior Files ===
1. Sea of Shadows (Stealth Books – December 2010) – Originally published as Torpedo (October 2004)
2. The Seventh Angel (Stealth Books – December 2010)
3. Sword of Shiva (Stealth Books – December 2012)

=== City Blues Series ===
1. Dome City Blues (Stealth Books – July 2011)
2. Angel City Blues (Stealth Books - September 2014)

=== Children's books ===
1. The Lonely Little Bumbershoot (Three Jellybean Press - December 2014)
