= A Smart and Courageous Child =

Japanese manga series

- Cover of the volume

かしこくて勇気ある子ども (Kashikokute Yūki Aru Kodomo)
- Manga
- Written by: Miki Yamamoto
- Published by: Leed Publishing
- English publisher: NA: Tokyopop
- Imprint: Torch Comics
- Magazine: Torch Web
- Original run: August 17, 2019 – May 20, 2020
- Volumes: 1

A Smart and Courageous Child (かしこくて勇気ある子ども, Kashikokute Yūki Aru Kodomo) is a Japanese manga series written and illustrated by Miki Yamamoto. It was serialized on Leed Publishing's Torch Web manga website from August 2019 to May 2020.

== Synopsis ==
Set in 2012, the series is centered around the worries of a couple about to have their first child. Sara and Kouta Takano are about to have their first child, but a few days before the birth of their child they hear about the attempted assassination of Malala Yousafzai, and it makes the couple anxious about the future of their child.

== Publication ==
Written and illustrated by Miki Yamamoto, A Smart and Courageous Child was serialized on Leed Publishing's Torch Web manga website from August 17, 2019, to May 20, 2020. The series was collected in a single tankōbon volume released on June 17, 2020.

In February 2024, Tokyopop announced that they had licensed the series for English publication.

No.	Original release date	Original ISBN	North American release date	North American ISBN
1	June 17, 2020	978-4-845-86061-6	November 19, 2024	978-1-427-87719-2

== Reception ==
The series ranked thirteenth in Freestyle magazine's "The Best 2021 Kono Manga wo Yome!" ranking in 2020. The series was ranked eighth in the 2021 edition of Takarajimasha's Kono Manga ga Sugoi! guidebook's ranking of the best manga for female readers. The series was nominated for the 25th Tezuka Osamu Cultural Prize in 2021. The series won an Excellence Award in the Manga category at the 24th Japan Media Arts Festival in 2021. The series was nominated for the Best One-Shot Manga category at Japan Society and Anime NYC's 2nd American Manga Awards in 2025.
