= Live with Yourself! =

Comedy webtoon by Andrew "Shen" Tsyaston and David J. Catman

- Author(s): Shen (2017–2020); David J. Catman (Note: Originally credited as David Mercier.) (2020–2024)
- Illustrator(s): Shen (2017–2019); David J. Catman (2019–2024)
- Website: Live with Yourself! on Webtoon
- Launch date: January 1, 2017
- End date: March 31, 2024
- Syndicate(s): Webtoon
- Publisher: Shen Comix
- Genre(s): Science fiction, comedy

Live with Yourself! (LWY) is a science fiction comedy webtoon series written and drawn by Andrew "Shen" Tsyaston and David J. Catman. Initially created by the former before passing creative control to the latter, it follows computer support worker Todd as he is split into four versions of himself (Todd, Tomo, Oldie, and Babs) from different times following a mad science experiment gone-wrong, who he becomes roommates with, his three older selves raising his younger self while dealing with both slice-of-life shenanigans and a serialised plot involving a future time civil war.

Released to the webtoon platform Webtoon, later made available to read via Webtoon Canvas (i.e. making a free Webtoon account and logging in), it was published across 542 episodes from January 1, 2017 to March 31, 2024. Live with Yourself! received a positive critical reception, being nominating for the 2023 Ringo Award for Best Humor Webcomic.

== Plot ==
Live with Yourself! is a science fiction comedy comic series. It follows Todd, a computer support worker, becomes split into four versions of himself from different times following a mad science experiment gone-wrong. Todd finds himself living with Tomo, the not-too-distant future of Todd; Oldie, a much older incarnation; and Babs, his baby self. Updated once a week, digitally available to read via the Webtoon mobile application, it was initially written and drawn by Andrew "Shen" Tsyaston, before David J. Catman took over as illustrator in 2019. Catman became the official writer in 2020.

The series is divided into three "seasons".

== Characters ==
Main characters

- Todd: A happy go-lucky young man who doesn't take life seriously, known for wearing a green hoodie.
- Tomo: The "Todd from tomorrow", with unkempt hair and stubble on his face. Known for wearing a blue hoodie, he is more bitter from always living the same day twice, unlike the continuously existing Todd.
- Oldie: The elderly Todd from the distant future, who wears glasses and the colour yellow.
- Babs: The infant Todd from the distant past, who has a pink baby blanket wrapped around himself. Having the power to age anything up, he can control his blanket as if a hand, with how he is raised for the day impacting the personalities of the others in their shared present.

Time Rebellion

- Sophie: Todd's red-wearing girlfriend and a member of the Time Rebellion.
- E6 and F5: Former members of the Time Council-turned-Time Rebellion members in a Todd-Tomo situation who are dating each other, much to Oldie's discomfort.
- Chisel Dangerma: The leader of the Time Rebellion.
- The Purple-haired-girl: The Time Rebellion's "tech-whizz".
- Sarge: A high-ranking member of Time City and Sophie's adoptive father.

Supporting characters

- Davian: The leader of the time-policing Time Bureau, who infiltrates the past.
- Professor Fixit: Todd's ex-boss and ex-employee and a gay paranormal investigator.
- Hattie: Todd's and Tomo's chaotic ex-girlfriend and a pink-wearing scam artist.
- Lex Winsmore: Todd's uncle, who operated as the superhero Mechoneko.
- Bernard: An overweight blogger and Fixit's nemesis.

== Reception ==
=== Critical reception ===
Multiversity Comics praised Live with Yourself! as a "a fascinating comic [that is] a very fun, wacky read", noting it as "the definition of solid and consistent" with "jokes [that] practically write themselves", while Comics Beat complimented Live with Yourself! as a "lighthearted webcomic [depicting] what it is like to deal with your own nonsense", describing the narrative as "funny, particularly sections with Babs [and] the sight gags and silliness".

Lemmy World praised Live with Yourself! as a "mostly fluffy, goofy series [with a] premise and plotlines [that] can be somewhat heavy" making for "a worthwhile read" while Webcomic Arts lauded the series' art for how "Shen has fantastic control over shape and color".

=== Accolades ===
Year	Award	Recipient	Category	Result	Ref.
2023	Ringo Award	Live with Yourself!	Best Humor Webcomic	Nominated	

== See also ==
- Time travel in fiction
