= Cursed Princess Club =

Weekly webtoon

- Volume 1 cover
- Author: LambCat
- Website: Cursed Princess Club
- Current status/schedule: Ended
- Launch date: February 24, 2019
- End date: March 4, 2024
- Publisher: Webtoon
- Genre(s): Fantasy, Comedy
- Original language: English

Cursed Princess Club is a weekly webtoon written and illustrated by LambCat. The strip began publishing on February 24, 2019 on Webtoon and ended on March 4, 2024. The strip was published in seasons, of which there are four, and during these seasons new comics were published on a weekly basis every Monday.

The series has received praise for its artwork and storylines.

== Synopsis ==
The series predominantly focuses on Gwendolyn "Gwen", a sixteen-year-old princess of the Pastel Kingdom who was raised with the utmost love and consideration from her father and three siblings. She, like her siblings, have all been raised in their castle and kept somewhat hidden from the outside world. This results in Gwen developing a sweet disposition but also becoming a bit sheltered from the outside world and its norms. As a result, Gwen is also unaware that her green skin and hair, particularly when contrasted against her siblings' conventional good looks, sometimes causes others to mistake her for a monster or witch. It isn't until Gwen and her two sisters are introduced to their future husbands that she truly becomes self conscious of her appearance, as she overhears her fiancé Frederick refer to her as ugly.

This rejection causes Gwen to develop low self-esteem and question her existence. It is then that she receives an invitation to a club referred to as the "CPC", which her family assumes is a well known and influential princess organization. When she eventually gains the courage to attend one of the gatherings, Gwen discovers that the CPC actually stands for the "Cursed Princess Club". This organization is made up of princesses who have been ostracized from their respective kingdoms for various reasons, ranging from enchantments and curses to their appearances. Led by President Calpernia, the CPC teaches its members to love and support themselves and others, as well as to question and challenge the norms that consider them to be outcasts.

== Development ==
Cursed Princess Club was originally created as an entry for a contest on Webtoon. LambCat chose to focus on fairy tales due to several tropes common to the genre and because it caused them to ask the question "What if the spells didn't break and there wasn't a happily ever after? What would that scenario be like?", which in turn led them to consider themes of insecurity and self-love. While not selected to proceed past the first round, LambCat was contacted by an editor who encouraged them to continue developing the series.

LambCat has stated that they have the ending plotted out, but that "It is still going to be very difficult to get there."

== Publication ==
=== Webtoon ===
Cursed Princess Club began publication on February 24, 2019 on the webtoon hosting service Webtoon. As is typical with webtoons, the strip is released in seasons, each of which are made up of a varying amount of episodes. As of January 2023 the webcomic has been read over 232 million times and has approximately 2.1 million subscribers.

Season	Beginning	End	Episodes	Notes
1	February 24, 2019	December 15, 2019	29	
2	August 18, 2019	March 22, 2020	32	
3	May 31, 2020	April 11, 2021	45	
4	August 15, 2021	March 4, 2024	67	This season had a brief hiatus, during which LambCat worked on print releases of the series.

=== Print ===
In November 2021 Webtoon announced their new imprint, Webtoon Unscrolled, through which they would release print editions of select series. The announced series included Cursed Princess Club and on January 3, 2023 the first volume was published. The different publication style required some alterations to the layout and speech bubbles.

Volume	Beginning	End	Episodes	Notes
1	February 24, 2019	September 15, 2019	1-34	
2	September 22, 2019	March 22, 2020	35-61	Four short bonus chapters between vol. 2 and 3.
3	May 31, 2020	September 20, 2020	62-77	
4	September 27, 2020	January 11, 2021	78-93	
5	January 18, 2021	April 11, 2021	94-106	
6	August 15, 2021	November 14, 2021	107-120	

== Reception ==
The series has received praise for its messages of body positivity and self-love. In a review for the first volume of the series the School Library Journal stated that it was an "affirming first volume in which the cast acknowledges inner beauty and stands firm with one another." Publisher Weekly wrote that the first volume "shines brightest in its humor;" of the art, they said "thin, wiry linework render characters with manga-esque features, and full-color art skillfully imbues midnight scenes and fanciful parties with eerie and grandiose ambiance." CBR praised the series for its messages and art style, noting that the series had a wide appeal and that "The overarching theme of challenging stereotypes and finding beauty within resonates with a universal audience."

=== Awards ===
- Ringo Award for Best Humor Webcomic (2021, nominated)
