= Printernia Nippon =

Japanese manga series

- Pinternia Nippon: My Squishy Bio-Printed Pet
- First tankōbon volume cover

プリンタニア・ニッポン (Purintania Nippon)
- Genre: Science fiction comedy
- Manga
- Written by: Maigo
- Published by: East Press
- English publisher: NA: Seven Seas Entertainment
- Magazine: Matogrosso (January 10, 2019–March 8, 2024); Comic Porta (March 8, 2024–present)
- Original run: January 10, 2019 – present
- Volumes: 6

Printernia Nippon: My Squishy Bio-Printed Pet (Japanese: プリンタニア・ニッポン, Hepburn: Purintania Nippon) is a Japanese manga series written and illustrated by Maigo. It began serialization on East Press' Matogrosso manga website in January 2019.

== Synopsis ==
Topographic designer Sato attempted to create a Shiba Inu using a bioprinter, but what actually came out was a mysterious creature resembling a rice cake with arms and legs. Sato named this creature, a "Printania Nippon," specifying its name as "Suama" and deciding to raise it, expanding his range of activities through Suama.

== Publication ==
Written and illustrated by Maigo, Printernia Nippon: My Squishy Bio-Printed Pet began serialization on East Press' Matogrosso manga website on January 10, 2019. The series was later transferred to the Comic Porta website on March 8, 2024. Its chapters have been compiled into six tankōbon volumes as of January 2026.

In September 2025, Seven Seas Entertainment announced that they had licensed the series for English publication, with the first volume set to release in September 2026.

| No. | Original release date | Original ISBN | North American release date | North American ISBN |
|---|---|---|---|---|
| 1 | September 17, 2020 | 978-4-7816-1915-6 | September 1, 2026 | 979-8-89863-087-4 |
Chapters 1–16; Bonus 1–2
| 2 | August 19, 2021 | 978-4-7816-2001-5 | January 5, 2027 | 979-8-89863-088-1 |
| 3 | December 14, 2022 | 978-4-7816-2149-4 | May 4, 2027 | 979-8-89863-089-8 |
| 4 | March 19, 2024 | 978-4-7816-2292-7 | — | — |
| 5 | February 13, 2025 | 978-4-7816-2425-9 | — | — |
| 6 | January 21, 2026 | 978-4-7816-2519-5 | — | — |

== Reception ==
The series was nominated for the sixth Next Manga Awards in 2020 in the web category and was ranked 13th. The series was ranked 4th in the Web Manga General Election 2023.
