= Wataridori to Katatsumuri =

Japanese manga series

- First tankōbon volume cover

渡り鳥とカタツムリ
- Genre: Slice of life
- Manga
- Written by: Makoto Takatsu
- Published by: Wani Books
- Imprint: Crunch Comics
- Magazine: NewsCrunch
- Original run: October 30, 2019 – present
- Volumes: 6
- Anime television series
- Original run: 2027 – scheduled

Wataridori to Katatsumuri (渡り鳥とカタツムリ; lit. 'Migratory Birds & Snail') is a Japanese manga series written and illustrated by Makoto Takatsu. It began serialization on Wani Books' NewsCrunch website in October 2019. An anime television series adaptation is set to premiere in 2027.

== Plot ==
Unpei Mochizuki has been working at a machine parts wholesaler for nearly two years, but one day, he makes a mistake that causes a lot of trouble for a client. Ashamed, Unpei wants to drive somewhere far away. Along the way, he meets a girl named Tsugumi Nagisa.

== Media ==
=== Manga ===
Written and illustrated by Makoto Takatsu, Wataridori to Katatsumuri began serialization on Wani Books' NewsCrunch website on October 30, 2019. Its chapters have been compiled into six tankōbon volumes as of March 2026.

No.	Release date	ISBN
1	August 25, 2020	978-4-8470-6856-0
2	February 25, 2021	978-4-8470-6859-1
3	September 25, 2021	978-4-8470-6863-8
4	December 25, 2024	978-4-8470-6893-5
5	August 25, 2025	978-4-8470-6897-3
6	March 25, 2026	978-4-8470-6901-7

=== Anime ===
An anime television series adaptation was announced on July 10, 2024. It is set to premiere in 2027.
