= D. P. Agrawal =

Indian historian, archaeologist, and author

Dharampal Agrawal in 2011

D. P. Agrawal (Dharmapal Agrawal) is a historian of Indian science and technology, archaeologist, and author. He has published works on Indian archaeology, metallurgy, the history of science, and palaeoclimate.

== Early life ==
Dharma Pal Agrawal was born on 15 March 1933 at Almora, United Provinces of British India (presently in Uttarakhand).

== Career ==
He has worked with the Archaeological Survey of India, Tata Institute of Fundamental Research and Physical Research Laboratory, all of which are All-India institutions. His researches were mainly done in the fields of palaeoenvironment, prehistoric archaeology, radiocarbon & TL dating, archaeometallurgy, India's contributions to the world of science and technology. At the Physical Research Laboratory, he was a Senior Professor and Area Chairman of the Quaternary Paleo-Climate Study Area, a large multi-disciplinary research group. He has been a visiting professor at the University of Pennsylvania and at the International Research Center at Kyoto,

== Contribution ==
Agrawal has made significant contributions to the fields of paleoenvironment, pre-historic archaeology, radiocarbon dating, the archaeology of metallurgy, and the history of science and technology in India. He has edited the journal Man and Environment for a number of years, and served on the advisory board of journals World Archaeology and Le anthropologie. He is a fellow of the National Academy of Sciences. and a member of the National Commission on the History of Science. During his academic career he has published 15 books and about 250 papers on different topics.

After retirement from the Physical Research Laboratory in 1993, he has been working as the Honorary Director of the Lok Vigyan Kendra in Almora, where he coordinates research on "traditional knowledge systems," codifying the accumulated folk knowledge on the crops, medicinal plants and biodiversity. He is also the chief editor of a multi-volume international project on the history of science and technology.

== Works ==
Books

- The Copper Bronze Age in India, Munshiram Manoharlal, 1971.
- Prehistoric Chronology and Radiocarbon Dating in India (with S. Kusumgar) Munshiram Manoharlal, 1974. ISBN 8121503167.
- Protohistoric Archaeology of India (in Hindi, with P. L. Agrawal), U.P. Granth Akademi, Lucknow, 1975.
- Essays in Indian Protohistory (with D. K. Chakrabarti). B.R.Publishers, 1978. ISBN 8170180430.
- The Archaeology of India. London : Curzon Press, 1981.
- Man and Environment in India through Ages, New Delhi: Books and Books, 1992.
- Dating the Human Past (with M. G. Vadava), Poona: Indian Society for Prehistoric and Quaternary Studies, 1995.
- Central Himalayas: An Archaeological, Linguistic and Cultural Synthesis (with J.S. Kharakwal). Aryan Books International, 1998. ISBN 8173051321.
- Ancient Metal Technology and Archaeology of South Asia: A Pan-Asian Perspective. Aryan Books International, 2000. ISBN 8173051771.
- South Asian Prehistory: A Multidisciplinary Study (with J.S. Kharakwal), Aryan Books International, 2002. ISBN 8173052360.
- Bronze and Iron Ages in South Asia (with J.S. Kharakwal), Aryan Books International, 2003. ISBN 8173052522.
- The Indus Civilization: An Interdisciplinary Perspective, Aryan Books International, 2007. ISBN 8173053103.

Edited works

- Palaeoclimatic and Palaeoenvironmental Changes in Asia (with S. K. Gupta and P. Sharma).. New Delhi : Indian National Science Academy, 1988.
- Radiocarbon and Indian Archaeology (with A. Ghosh). Bombay: Tata Institute of Fundamental Research, 1973.
- Ecology and Archaeology of Western India (with Agrawal, D.P. and B.M. Pande). New Delhi: Concept Publishers, 1977.
- Climate and Geology of Kashmir and Central India : The Last 4 Million years (with R. V. Krishnamurthy and S. Kusumgar). T.T. Publishers (New Delhi), 1985.
- Traditional Knowledge and Archaeology, (with Sameer Jamal and Manikant Shah). Aryan Books International, 2007. ISBN 8173053340.
- The Harappan Technology and its Legacy, Rupa and Co, 2009 (with Infinity Foundation). ISBN 8129115328.

== Views and reception ==
The 1971 book Copper Bronze Age in India reports an integrated study of the Copper-Bronze Age carried out at the Tata Institute of Fundamental Research, covering its chronology, technology and ecology.
