= The Many Deaths of Laila Starr =

Comic book series by BOOM! Studios

The Many Deaths of Laila Starr is a comic book series written by Ram V with illustrations by Filipe Andrade that was published on April 14, 2021, by Boom! Studios.

== Background ==
The series was released during the COVID-19 pandemic and focused on the theme of death. The series is set in the city of Mumbai where Ram V was born.

== Plot ==
The story is narrated by the god of life and follows three protagonists—a pregenant woman in labor, a woman at a college party, and the god of death.

== Reception ==
Tom Batten praised the series in the Library Journal calling it "A passionate and refreshingly unsentimental fable". The Publishers Weekly review expressed disappointment in the series stating that "The opening pages ... brim with explosive energy before losing momentum." Dustin Nelson praised the series in Thrillist calling it a "loving meditation on hope and the beauty of the present."

=== Awards ===
Award	Date	Category	Result	Ref.
Eisner Awards	2022	Best Limited Series	Nominated	
Eisner Awards	2022	Best Penciller/Inker or Penciller/Inker Team	Nominated	
Eisner Awards	2022	Best Coloring	Nominated	
Goodreads Choice Awards	2022	Graphic Novels & Comics	Nominated	
Ignatz Awards	2022	Outstanding Series	Won	

== Adaptations ==
The Minnesota Opera created an operatic adaptation of the comic book series. Commissioned as part of the Minnesota Opera's New Works Initiative, it will make its world premiere on Oct. 31, 2026.

The adaptation features music by Kamala Sankaram and a libretto by Minita Gandhi.
