= 15 Minutes Before We Really Date =

Japanese manga series

- First tankōbon volume cover

マジで付き合う15分前 (Maji de Tsukiau 15-fun Mae)
- Genre: Romantic comedy
- Manga
- Written by: Perico
- Published by: Kadokawa Shoten
- English publisher: NA: Yen Press
- Imprint: Kadokawa Comics A
- Original run: September 17, 2019 – January 29, 2023
- Volumes: 4

15 Minutes Before We Really Date (マジで付き合う15分前, Maji de Tsukiau 15-fun Mae) is a Japanese manga series written and illustrated by Perico. It was serialized on the author's Pixiv account from September 2019 to January 2023.

== Synopsis ==
Yuki and Natsuna have been childhood friends and lived in the same apartment complex for ten years. When high school graduation starts approaching, the two make a decision - to begin dating.

== Publication ==
Written and illustrated by Perico, 15 Minutes Before We Really Date was serialized on the author's Pixiv account from September 17, 2019, to January 29, 2023. The series was later acquired by Kadokawa Shoten who compiled the series' chapters into four tankōbon volumes released from February 26, 2021, to April 26, 2023. The series is licensed in English by Yen Press.

No.	Original release date	Original ISBN	North American release date	North American ISBN
1	February 26, 2021	978-4-04-111215-1	November 21, 2023	978-1-97-536895-1
1. "15 Minutes Before We Really Date"; 2. "15 Minutes Before We Hold Hands"; 3. "15 Minutes Before We Say Goodbye"; 4. "15 Minutes Before We Embrace"; 5. "15 Minutes Before the Tears Flow"; 6. "15 Minutes Before We Get Rained On"; 7. "15 Minutes Before We Can't Sleep"; 8. "15 Minutes Before the Silence"; 9. "15 Minutes Before We Get Serious"; 10. "15 Minutes Before We Rendezvous"; 11. "15 Minutes Before It Begins"; 12. "15 Minutes Before I Keep an Eye on You"; 13. "15 Minutes Before We're Bashful"; 14. "15 Minutes Before It's All So Precious"; Bonus: 1. "15 Minutes Before We Really Date +"; 2. "15 Minutes Before You're Seriously Cut"; 3. "An Old Story of a Couple Who Isn't Really Dating"; Extra: "15 Minutes Before I Stare"
2	February 26, 2022	978-4-04-111825-2	April 16, 2024	978-1-97-536942-2
16. "15 Minutes Before We Get Close"; 17. "15 Minutes Before We ◌◌"; 18. "15 Minutes Before I Keep an Eye on You: Halloween"; 19. "15 Minutes Before I Make You Cry"; 20. "15 Minutes Before I Get Butterflies"; 21. "15 Minutes Before I Ship Those Two"; 22. "15 Minutes Before We Break Up"; 23. "15 Minutes Before We Embrace"; 24. "A Christmas When We Really Date"; 25. "15 Minutes Before We Get Serious"; 26. "A Really Dating Present (from Yuuki)"; 27. "A Really Dating Present (from Natsuna)"; 28. "15 Minutes Before a Fight"; 29. "Really Dating on January 1"; 30. "15 Minutes Before You're Jealous"; Bonus: "15 Minutes Before We Embrace + Natsuna's Take"; Extra: "15 Minutes Before You're Jealous +"
3	April 26, 2023	978-4-04-113626-3	July 30, 2024	978-1-97-538853-9
31. "15 Minutes Before We Snuggle"; 32. "15 Minutes Before We Snack Together"; 33. "15 Minutes Before We Communicate"; 34. "15 Minutes Before We Say Cheese"; 35. "15 Minutes Before You Move"; 36. "15 Minutes Before We Dazzle"; 37. "15 Minutes Before We Confer"; 38. "15 Minutes Before We Boost Each Other"; 39. "15 Minutes Before I Apologize"; 40. "15 Minutes Before I Can't Say It"; 41. "Final Arc: Talk About the Future, Part 1"; 42. "Final Arc: Talk About the Future, Part 2"; 43. "Final Arc: Talk About the Future, Part 3"; 44. "Final Arc: Talk About the Future, Part 4"; Bonus: "A Birthday When We Really Date"; Extra: "15 Minutes Before We Say Cheese +"
4	April 26, 2023	978-4-04-113629-4	October 15, 2024	978-1-97-538855-3
45. "Final Arc: Talk About the Future, Part 5"; 46. "Final Arc: Talk About the Future, Part 6"; 47. "Final Arc: Talk About the Future, Part 7"; 48. "Final Arc: Talk About the Future, Part 8"; 49. "Final Arc: Talk About the Future, Part 9"; 50. "15 Minutes Before You Embark"; 51. "15 Minutes Before We Really Date: END"; Bonus: 6. "15 Minutes Before Our Hearts Thunder, Part 1"; 7. "15 Minutes Before Our Hearts Thunder, Part 2"; 8. "15 Minutes Before Our Hearts Thunder, Part 3"; Special chapter

== Reception ==
The series was one of 50 nominees for the seventh Next Manga Awards in 2020 in the web category.
