= Homestuck =

Multimedia webcomic by Andrew Hussie

- Author: Andrew Hussie
- Website: homestuck.com
- Launch date: April 13, 2009
- End date: April 13, 2016 (Note: This end date does not count the credits or photos posted to the official Homestuck Snapchat.)
- Publishers: TopatoCo (2011–2013); Viz Media (2017–2023)

Homestuck is an Internet fiction multimedia series created by American author and artist Andrew Hussie. The fourth and best-known of Hussie's four MS Paint Adventures, it originally ran from April 13, 2009, to April 13, 2016. Though normally described as a webcomic, and partly constituted by a series of single panel pages, Homestuck also relies heavily on Flash animations and instant message logs to convey its story, along with the occasional use of browser games.

Homestuck's plot begins with a group of teens who seemingly trigger the destruction of Earth by installing the beta version of an upcoming PC game, Sburb. The teens soon come into contact with a group of twelve Internet trolls who are revealed to be grey-skinned, horned aliens, and these trolls work with the teens to create a new universe by completing the game. It is renowned for its complex and nonlinear narrative, considerable length at over 8,000 pages and 800,000 words, and intensely devoted fan community.

Homestuck's success has resulted in numerous related projects and sequels, including the Hiveswap series of adventure games. On August 9, 2025, an animated web series pilot adaptation was announced by Vivienne Medrano's company SpindleRoo, an Australian division of SpindleHorse, with Skye Henwood as director and writer. Released on September 27, 2025, the pilot stars Toby Fox, Cherami Leigh, Colleen O'Shaughnessey, Adam McArthur, Chris O'Neill, and Brandon Winckler.

== Synopsis ==
Sburb's "beta" logo prior to the Scratch, a cataclysmic universe-resetting event

In 2009, on John Egbert's thirteenth birthday, he receives a beta copy of a mysterious computer game called Sburb, which he can use to manipulate the real world through a sandbox game style interface. John's friends—Rose Lalonde, Dave Strider, and Jade Harley—join him in the game, which causes massive meteor storms to appear that target each of their homes. They only escape by completing tasks in the game until they are able to travel to a place called "the Medium", and they learn that installing Sburb has somehow triggered the destruction of Earth, and that they must beat the game to create a new universe.

While exploring the Medium, John and his friends are attacked by a ruthless villain known as Jack Noir. John and his friends are also harassed by a group of twelve Internet trolls whose own session of Sburb ended in failure, for which they blame the kids. Among the trolls, Karkat Vantas, Kanaya Maryam, Terezi Pyrope, and Vriska Serket each develop a relationship with the four humans, and the trolls are revealed to be an actual species of troll-like aliens. The narrative shifts to a side story arc about the trolls and the specific sequence of events that led this group to play their own session of the game. The enigmatic Doc Scratch, who serves an even more mysterious master, manipulated the trolls. The trolls eventually win their session and a new universe – the universe the kids inhabit – is created. Before they can claim their prize, they are attacked by Jack Noir and forced into hiding on a meteor, where they begin to troll the kids via a chat program.

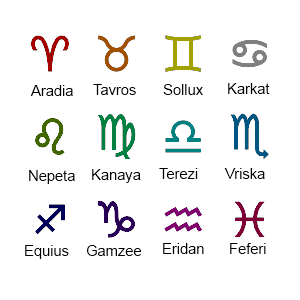
Each of the twelve trolls is associated with a Western zodiac sign and a color.

Returning to the present, the two species cooperate to salvage the kids' game session. However, Vriska sabotages key events, resulting in the kids accidentally transforming Jack Noir into a seemingly invincible monster. Rising tensions among the trolls eventually boil over, and some begin to attack and kill the others; almost half the group (including Vriska) dies before Karkat manages to restore order. From Doc Scratch, the kids learn about a game mechanism called the "Scratch" that allows the humans to reset their session to escape Jack but will also inadvertently summon Lord English, Doc Scratch's master who seeks dominion over all of reality.

Executing the Scratch resets the kids' universe, and versions of themselves become guardians to a new group of players, who are versions of their own ancestors. As a result, John's late grandmother, Jane Crocker, is fifteen years old and the protagonist of the new arc. She leads her three friends Roxy Lalonde, Dirk Strider, and Jake English—Rose's mother, Dave's brother, and Jade's grandfather, respectively—through their own session of the game, while the original humans and surviving trolls journey through dimensions to the new post-Scratch session over the course of three years.

The post-Scratch version of Earth quickly becomes dominated by Her Imperious Condescension (a.k.a. the Condesce), the sinister former troll empress now in service to Lord English. In lieu of trolls, the four post-Scratch kids interact online with one* alien cherub, (Note: The cherubs are green skeleton-like creatures named for the biblical cherubim. Fitting the name, the mature form of their species has wings, evoking common depictions of angels.) the siblings Calliope and Caliborn. While Calliope becomes a fast friend of the group, Caliborn resents their camaraderie, and is highly antagonistic towards them. After the post-Scratch kids enter their session, the two cherubs play their own version of Sburb in a session that sees Caliborn having his sister assassinated so that he may be the sole winner of the game.

When finally uniting in the new session, the kids and trolls enact a plan to create a new universe and to defeat Lord English, the Condesce, and Jack Noir; the latter of whom escaped from the original doomed session. John Egbert develops new powers allowing him to retcon previous events within the Homestuck narrative. In the ensuing conflict, only John, Roxy, Dirk, and one of the trolls, Terezi, survive. With Terezi's guidance, John retcons key events in the narrative, most notably Vriska's death, setting up a timeline with a clear path to victory. In the retconned narrative, the kids and trolls defeat their enemies in a giant battle and successfully create the new universe. The comic ends with Lord English fighting an army led by Vriska, Caliborn becoming Lord English after gaining unconditional immortality as a reward for beating Sburb alone, and the remaining living heroes about to enter their newly created universe.

== Style and development ==
A screenshot of Homestuck page 668

While nominally a webcomic, Homestuck consists of a combination of static images, animated GIFs, and instant message logs. Generally, pages included a single panel, and navigational links to successive pages are phrased similarly to commands in interactive fiction games. Additionally, unlike previous works from Andrew Hussie which exclusively relied on GIF images for animation, Homestuck introduced complex animations and browser games made with Adobe Flash, many involving contributions from fan artists. According to academic Kevin Veale of Massey University, Homestuck used these various methods of engagement to manipulate its readers' experiences in order to tell a multilayered non-linear story.

The basic premise of Sburb has been described as similar to games like The Sims, Spore, and EarthBound. As in Hussie's prior webcomic Problem Sleuth, the adventure is characterized by time travel, mystery, a complex fictional universe, and frequent references to pop culture and previous adventures. Changes from previous stories include an emphasis on contemporary society, such as online gaming and Internet culture, which contrasts with the historical settings of MS Paint Adventures comics Bard Quest and Problem Sleuth.

Hussie first launched an early version of Homestuck, the Homestuck Beta, on April 10, 2009. The Homestuck Beta was published only three days after Problem Sleuth and ran until April 13, 2009.

A recurring symbol throughout Homestuck is the spirograph.

The initial style of the webcomic was shaped by fan contributions, with the fans deciding what actions the characters would take. Later, Hussie moved away from this format due to the fan input method having grown "too unwieldy and made it difficult... to tell a coherent story." While Hussie now controlled the main plot of the story and the characters' actions, he still "visit[ed] fan blogs and forums" to figure out small things to add into Homestuck. However, throughout its run, content within Homestuck would cease to be updated in several named pauses. The most infamous of these pauses was the result of Andrew Hussie taking a full year to solely focus on the production of Hiveswap in the gigapause.

On April 13, 2016, Andrew Hussie released the final chapter of the webcomic: a nine-minute-long animated short titled "[S] ACT 7". Andrew Hussie stated that an epilogue to the webcomic would be released at some point in the future. In late 2016, the comic updated with a credit sequence and more panels in the form of a Snapchat story. By the end of its run, the entire work contained over 800,000 words across at least 8,000 pages.

Cover of Homestuck Book 1 depicting (from left to right) Dave Strider, Rose Lalonde, and John Egbert

After its completion, writer Ben Tolkin said, "Do I recommend Homestuck? Should you drop everything and start reading it? You can't. Homestuck is over, and I mean over, not just that it isn't updating. 'Homestuck' the masterpiece, was the event, the community, the shifting pace of updates, the constant chatter between fandom and author. Homestuck is done. If you missed it, you missed it." Rob Beschizza added that reading Homestuck now would be "like buying a DVD of Woodstock. It doesn't matter how well they played or how pretty they were; what mattered was being there."

In 2018, Hussie partnered with Viz Media to release physical versions of Homestuck. These hardcover books featured the original storyline and art, while also providing new commentary.

== Related projects ==
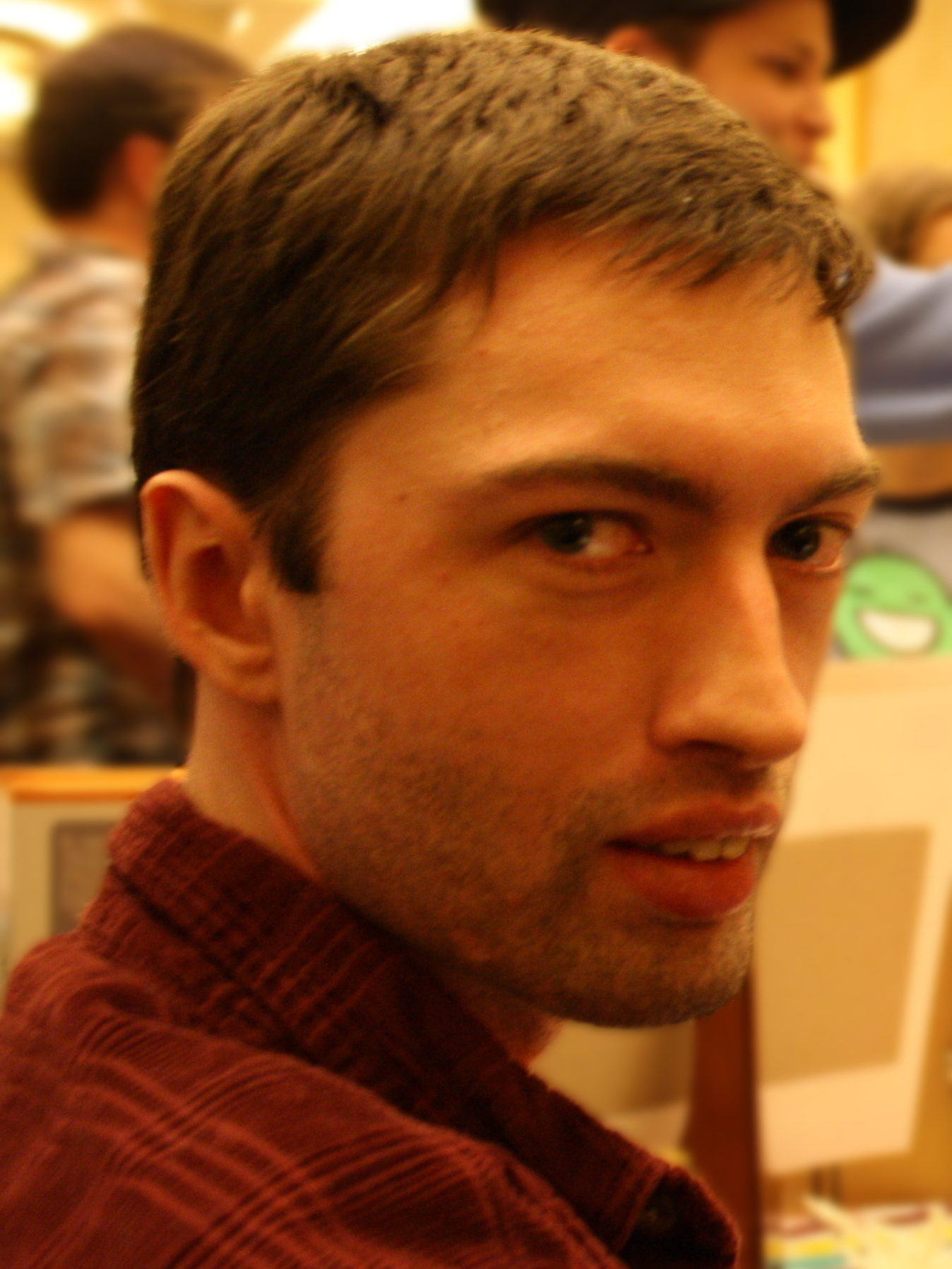
Homestuck creator Andrew Hussie at a fan convention in 2010

A significant amount of merchandise has been sold through Hussie's shop, company, and record label What Pumpkin, including "T-shirts, hoodies, pins, books" and fan art prints. Fans have also been "recruited" to make music for the webcomic. The music has been bundled into albums, with ten major soundtrack albums having been released thus far, in addition to eighteen side albums. On April 13, 2014, the fifth anniversary of Homestuck, Paradox Space, an anthology spin-off webcomic, was launched.

=== Sequels ===
On April 13, 2019 – exactly ten years after Homestuck started – The Homestuck Epilogues began. The Epilogues are presented in purely text format with no images, completely abandoning the webcomic genre and instead being styled similarly to Archive of Our Own fanfiction. They further the meta-narrative developed in Homestuck itself, telling two parallel stories of a Meat Timeline, whose story is centered around tying up loose plot threads from the original work, and a Candy Timeline, whose story includes many elements typically associated with "fanon". These two timelines are juxtaposed and eventually begin to interact with one another. Alongside Andrew Hussie, it was also written by multiple fan writers. Though released for free online, the Homestuck Epilogues were also given a physical release.

Homestuck: Beyond Canon
- Author: Furthest Ring Studios
- Website: beyondcanon.com
- Current status/schedule: Running
- Launch date: October 25, 2019

On October 25, 2019, an official followup was launched, titled Homestuck: Beyond Canon, initially Homestuck^2. Homestuck: Beyond Canon has been written by a team of writers based on a story outline by Hussie, and the project receives funding from Patreon. In March 2021, Homestuck: Beyond Canon's about page was updated to state that the work was "updated regularly for about a year until it was paused indefinitely. The creative team is now being commissioned to finish the story privately. All content will be posted here at once when the story is complete." According to a February 2021 post on Homestuck's Patreon page, "Homestuck^2 is going to be completed, but this Patreon will not be charging patrons anymore." Snake Solutions, a company commissioned to write and illustrate Homestuck^2, has reportedly shut down. On October 8, 2023, the comic was updated again for the first time in nearly three years, with a news post stating that the comic was being worked on by a new team being directed by Hiveswap composer James Roach, with Hussie acting as Executive Producer. On October 30, 2023, the Homestuck Patreon was relaunched. The ^2 from the title was also dropped, with Roach saying "In the original outline, it was just called Homestuck: Beyond Canon. Andrew mentioned the old team pushed for the ^2 but this isn't actually a sequel in the traditional sense." The original chapters leading up to the first 2023 update were also referred to as a "prologue" by Roach.

=== Sweet Bro and Hella Jeff ===
Early in Homestuck, Hussie introduced a webcomic contained within the main story titled Sweet Bro and Hella Jeff. The webcomic, drawn within Homestuck by character Dave Strider, is intentionally poorly made.

TopatoCo produced a print publication collecting the strips. The press release from TopatoCo described Sweet Bro and Hella Jeff as "the worst comic strip ever". In 2017, TopatoCo announced a second Sweet Bro and Hella Jeff book, co-written by dril, co-drawn by KC Green, and funded through Kickstarter.

=== Video games ===
On September 4, 2012, Hussie announced a Kickstarter to raise funds to develop a Homestuck video game. Kotaku noted that the project had raised "more than $275,000 in hours". More than 80% of the $700,000 goal was pledged in the first day. The game reached the full $700,000 of funding in fewer than 32 hours. The campaign also reached certain "stretch goal" amounts, whereupon Hussie added macOS and Linux support onto the proposed game. Digital Trends writer Graeme McMillan commented that the campaign was approaching, at the time, the record for most successful comics-related Kickstarter campaign, which was previously held by The Order of the Stick campaign with $1,254,120. The Kickstarter eventually raised $2,485,506, making it the "fifth game on Kickstarter to pull in a full seven figures" and the third highest funded video game in Kickstarter history at the time. An additional PayPal-based fundraiser was created to accommodate those who could not donate via Kickstarter's available methods.

While development was going to initially be done by game studio The Odd Gentlemen, production was later moved in-house to What Pumpkin. This coincided with a change in the game's art style from 3D to 2D. Development began in 2013, with the finished product expected in 2014; the first episode was later released in 2017. Additionally, Homestuck has led to the creation of two visual novel games: Hiveswap Friendsim and Pesterquest.

=== Animated pilot ===
External videos
- HOMESTUCK – The Animated Pilot on YouTube

On August 9, 2025, an animated web series pilot was announced by Vivienne Medrano's company SpindleRoo, an Australian division of SpindleHorse, with Skye Henwood as director/writer and starring Toby Fox as John Egbert, Cherami Leigh as Rose Lalonde, Colleen O'Shaughnessey as Jade Harley, Adam McArthur as Dave Strider, Chris O'Neill as the narrator, and Brandon Winckler as Karkat Vantas. In an interview with Polygon, in September 2025, it was noted that the pilot will be 11 minutes long. Medrano told the publication that audience reaction will determine whether studios are interested in developing the pilot into a full animated series, or if it will be continued on her YouTube channel, and stating that the pilot will cover most of the webcomic's first chapter, adding that Spindlehorse animation director Skye Henwood is "an enormous fan [who] knows the comic very intimately" who will be working with Hussie to condense the story, particularly if the series is continued beyond the pilot. Ben Jones, who was known for the creation of the Cartoon Network series The Problem Solverz, served as animation director. The animated pilot later released on September 27, 2025. As of July 2026, the pilot has over 2.5 million views.

== Fandom ==
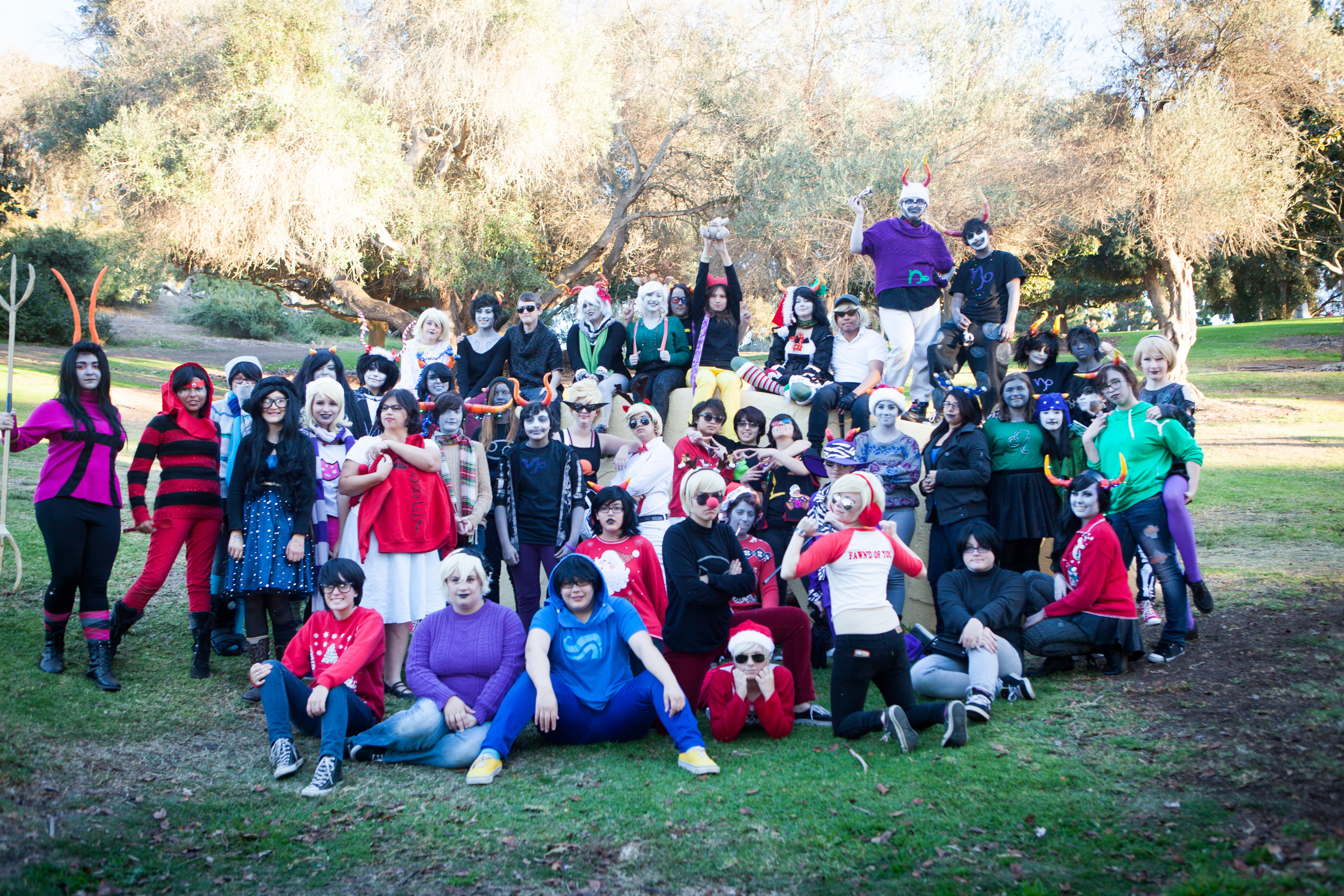
A group of Homestuck fans in cosplay in 2013

=== MSPFA ===
MS Paint Fan Adventures, or MSPFA for short, is a website in which users can create and view stories in the Homestuck format. During the period when the series was still ongoing, Andrew Hussie allowed fans to contribute suggestions to the story via the MS Paint Adventures forums, but this was later deprecated when the work got more popular.

=== Intensity and size ===
Throughout much of its history, the size of Homestuck's fandom was in the millions, with around a million unique visitors coming to the site daily. At one point, one of the webcomic's Flash animations, Cascade, caused Newgrounds, Megaupload, and Twitter to crash when it was uploaded, due to the strain that the number of views had put on the servers.

=== Notable fans ===
Composer Toby Fox in 2017

Actor Dante Basco is a known fan of the webcomic, having been urged to read it by friends telling him that the character Rufio, which he played in the 1991 film Hook, is featured in it. This interest in the webcomic led to a friendship with Andrew Hussie and resulted in the creation of a new character, Rufioh, with Basco's "typing quirks and personality". He would then team up with the Voice Over Nexus YouTube channel to voice the titular character in Let's Read Homestuck.

Toby Fox, best known for his later creation of the video games Undertale and Deltarune, was a noted member of Homestuck's official Music Contribution Team. Amanda Brennan, an Internet historian, has credited much of Undertale's initial success on Tumblr to Fox's association with Homestuck.

== Reception and impact ==
So begins Homestuck, Andrew Hussie's webcomic/cartoon/video game/mixed media art project that went on to take over every convention with a sea of grey body paint, surpass War and Peace's word count, raise $2.5 million on Kickstarter and then suddenly disappear, leaving its fans either desperate for more or wanting to forget it ever happened.

— Reuben Baron, "Let Me Tell You About Homestuck, the Internet's Most Ambitious Comic"

Lauren Rae Orsini, in an interview with Andrew Hussie, asked Hussie whether, because of the immense size of Homestuck and its fandom, with more than 5,000 pages and 128 characters at the time, Hussie considered himself in control of the comic. Hussie responded that he felt Homestuck was "still under my control", but that the background of Homestuck as a movement "is not under my control, and never really was." Orsini also suggested, in a separate article, that the effort put forward by people who finish Homestuck is an example of effort justification.

Homestuck was compared to James Joyce's Ulysses by PBS Idea Channel due to the work's length and complexity. Lori Henderson of the School Library Journal described Homestuck as being "mostly black and white with splashes of color and a minimal amount of animation", but said that it worked for the webcomic and that, because the "characters are a little goofy-looking and are often shown without arms", it only "adds to the charm". Mordicai Knode of Tor Books explained that Homestuck has to be discussed separately as a webcomic and in terms of its plot. Comparing it to hypertext fiction and the genre's attempted use in physical novels like Pale Fire and House of Leaves, Knode concluded that "Homestuck is the first great work of genuinely hypertext fiction. If that puts it in the same breath as Ulysses, then so be it."

Bryan Lee O'Malley, creator of the graphic novel series Scott Pilgrim, described Homestuck as a "massive undertaking of deftly-handled long-term serialized storytelling. It's well-written and thoughtful. It has things to say". NPR named it among its top 100 reader favorite comics and graphic novels in 2017.

== Bibliography ==
=== TopatoCo ===
- Hussie, Andrew (2011). Homestuck: Book One. Easthampton, MA: TopatoCo. ISBN 978-1-936561-82-7.
- Hussie, Andrew (2012). Homestuck: Book Two. Easthampton, MA: TopatoCo. ISBN 978-1-936561-83-4.
- Hussie, Andrew (2013). Homestuck: Book Three. Easthampton, MA: TopatoCo. ISBN 978-1-936561-10-0.

=== Viz Media ===
- Hussie, Andrew (2018). Homestuck, Book 1: Act 1 & Act 2. San Francisco, CA: VIZ Media. ISBN 978-1-4215-9940-3.
- Hussie, Andrew (2018). Homestuck, Book 2: Act 3 & Intermission. San Francisco, CA: VIZ Media. ISBN 978-1-4215-9939-7.
- Hussie, Andrew (2018). Homestuck, Book 3: Act 4. San Francisco, CA: VIZ Media. ISBN 978-1-4215-9941-0.
- Hussie, Andrew (2019). Homestuck, Book 4: Act 5 Act 1. San Francisco, CA: VIZ Media. ISBN 978-1-4215-9942-7.
- Hussie, Andrew (2019). Homestuck, Book 5: Act 5 Act 2 Part 1. San Francisco, CA: VIZ Media. ISBN 978-1-4215-9943-4.
- Hussie, Andrew (2020). Homestuck, Book 6: Act 5 Act 2 Part 2. San Francisco, CA: VIZ Media. ISBN 978-1-974706-50-1.
- Hussie, Andrew (2020). The Homestuck Epilogues: Volume Meat / Volume Candy. San Francisco, CA: Viz Media. ISBN 978-1-974701-08-7.
