= Hiveswap =

2017 video game spinoff of Homestuck

- Cover image for Act 1
- Developer: What Pumpkin Games
- Publisher: What Pumpkin Games
- Director: Cohen Edenfield
- Producers: Andrew Hussie; Cindy Dominguez
- Writers: Andrew Hussie; Cohen Edenfield
- Composers: Toby Fox; James Roach; Clark Powell
- Series: Homestuck
- Engine: Unity
- Platforms: Microsoft Windows, macOS, Linux
- Release: Act 1 September 14, 2017; Act 2 November 25, 2020; Act 3; 2026
- Genre: Adventure

Hiveswap is a episodic adventure game developed by What Pumpkin Games and overseen by Andrew Hussie and Cohen Edenfield. Based in the universe of Hussie's MS Paint Adventures webcomic Homestuck, it focuses on a girl, Joey Claire, who is accidentally transported to the planet of Alternia—home of the troll species seen in Homestuck.

The game was the subject of a crowdfunding campaign on Kickstarter, raising over US$2.4 million in funding. While development initially began with developers The Odd Gentlemen, it was eventually moved back in-house under What Pumpkin's own newly formed game development studio.

Act 1 was slated for release in mid-2015; however, the release was postponed until January 2017. It was further delayed in January to an unspecified date. On September 14, 2017, What Pumpkin Studios released Act 1. This was the release date previously announced on August 29, 2017, accompanied by a new trailer.

On October 25, 2020, a trailer was released revealing that Act 2 would be released in November 2020. Another trailer released on November 16, 2020. Act 2 was released on November 25, 2020.

== Story ==
Hiveswap tells the story of a human girl named Joey Claire, who gets swapped with a troll boy named Dammek from the planet Alternia, as she tries to get back to Earth. A second game, Hauntswitch, will feature Dammek's adventures on Earth. While set in the same universe as the Homestuck comic, Hiveswap and the sequel exist in a separate storyline with only "loose relation" to the comic, and involve a new cast of characters.

== Development ==
Despite strong initial successes, the development of Hiveswap experienced numerous logistical, chronological, and financial setbacks.

On September 4, 2012, Andrew Hussie announced a Kickstarter to raise funds for a video game based on his MS Paint Adventures webcomic Homestuck. Development was to begin in 2013, with the finished product expected in 2014. Kotaku noted that the project had raised "more than $275,000 in hours". More than 80% of the $700,000 goal was pledged in the first day.

At the time the article went to print, the Kickstarter had been running for just over one day. The game reached the full $700,000 of funding in fewer than 32 hours. The campaign also reached certain "stretch goal" amounts, whereupon Hussie added Mac and Linux support onto the proposed game. Digital Trends writer Graeme McMillan commented that the campaign was approaching, at the time, the record for most successful comics-related Kickstarter campaign, whose previous record was held by the Order of the Stick campaign with $1,254,120. The Kickstarter eventually raised $2,485,506, making it the "fifth game on Kickstarter to pull in a full seven figures" and the third highest funded video game in Kickstarter history at the time. An additional PayPal-based fundraiser was created to accommodate those who could not donate via Kickstarter's available methods.

In December 2013, new details, a projected release date of June 2014, and concept art were posted on the game's Kickstarter blog. In the post, Hussie revealed that the game would effectively be a spin-off from the comic, with a new plot and characters that will only have loose ties to the original storyline, making it more accessible to those who are unfamiliar with the original story. Hussie also indicated that the game will not include any voice acting; he considered voice acting "too easy to do badly", and stated that he was "personally not that big on VA in games like this anyway". On June 21, 2014, it was publicly announced that the game would be developed by The Odd Gentlemen—known for their game The Misadventures of P.B. Winterbottom. New concept art, including that of another new character, were also revealed.

In an interview with Game Informer, Undertale developer Toby Fox, who has worked with Hussie in the past, announced that he was contacted to write music for "the Homestuck video game".

On October 30, 2014, it was announced that the game's official title would be Hiveswap, and that production of the game had been taken back in-house "alarmingly well" under Hussie's What Pumpkin studio. It was also announced that the game would be the first of two distinct stories: each will be an episodic story, but there will be parallels between them, and they can be played in either order.

On December 26, 2015, updates were posted on the project's Kickstarter page stating that the game was going to be using a 2D system rather than using the 3D graphics shown in the teaser trailer, asset reel, and other footage. It is stated that this is "to make things a little more cost-efficient, and more rapidly producible over the full span of the series".

On October 6, 2016, a teaser trailer was released showcasing the game's changes to the 2D system and other various elements of the game, including combat and interactive objects. A release date for the first act was set to January 2017, but was delayed for a non-specific number of weeks. The game was greenlit on Steam on December 15, 2016, and showcased a number of in-game screenshots. On April 13, 2017 (Homestuck's 8th anniversary), another trailer for the game was released, this time showing parts of Alternia as well as more gameplay.

Promotion for Act 2 includes the "Troll Call", a feature of troll characters slated to appear in the installment, and the "Extended Zodiac", a feature of 288 symbols, including the original astrological signs as used by Homestuck characters, as well as symbols used by Hiveswap characters, complemented by a personality quiz to determine the quiz taker's Extended Zodiac sign. The characters from the Troll Call were later featured in a spinoff video game called Hiveswap Friendship Simulator. Starting on September 4, 2019, a sequel to Hiveswap Friendship Simulator called Pesterquest began. The story picks up where Hiveswap Friendship Simulator ended and it follows MSPA Reader (the playable character) as they interact with the kids and the trolls from the original webcomic Homestuck, such as Dave Strider and Vriska Serket.

On October 25, 2020, another teaser was released revealing that Hiveswap: Act 2 would be released in November 2020. Three weeks after that, on November 16, 2020, a gameplay trailer was livestreamed revealing the release date of November 25, 2020. The game would be released to controversy due to lacking credits upon release. The official Twitter account @homestuckteam would claim the reasoning to be the prevention of targeted harassment against those who worked on the game, and members of the Hiveswap team would reply claiming they were not consulted before the decision was made. Hiveswap: Act 2 would later be silently patched with credits on November 28.

The development of Hiveswap: Act 3 would be revealed on July 16, 2022, during a presentation at the Homestuck convention SAHCon. Two years later on July 20, 2024, another presentation was held at SAHCon, with commentary and a fan Q&A with producer Jonaya Riley, composer James Roach, and artist Kim Quach.

In 2025, What Pumpkin Studios used a Bluesky account and a Tumblr blog written from the perspective of the character Jerann Mussel as part of an ongoing promotion for Hiveswap: Act 3. The accounts posted in‑universe commentary, short fictional entries, and references to "Jeevik Week," an in‑game celebration from the series. They also showcased new characters in a style reminiscent of the Troll Call cards introduced for Act 2. On November 29, 2025, the Bluesky account announced a community event scheduled for December 13, 2025, instructing readers to RSVP via the official Discord server. Presented in a role-playing format, the profiles functioned as coordinated promotional outlets. A demo of Act 3 was released on December 13th, 2025.

== Reception ==
Reviewing Hiveswap: Act 1, Polygon gave the game a score of 8 out of 10, citing minor bugs, a "convoluted UI", and its short length of about two hours as issues but praising the game's humor as "hilarious", its art as "gorgeous", and the setting as "a treasure trove [...] for players to explore."

Hiveswap: Act 2 would be released to mixed reception, with reviewers calling the writing bloated and gameplay tedious.

== Spin-offs ==
Two visual novel spin-offs connected to Hiveswap were developed by What Pumpkin Games. Both titles expand upon characters and settings that were created by Andrew Hussie and What Pumpkin in the Homestuck universe.

=== Hiveswap: Friendsim ===
Hiveswap: Friendsim was released on May 11, 2018. The game consists of a series of short, episodic stories in which players meet and interact with various troll characters from the Hiveswap setting. It was published digitally for PC through Steam. On December 7, 2023, video games publisher, Fellow Traveller Games, released Hiveswap: Friendsim for the Nintendo Switch, the PlayStation 4, and the PlayStation 5.

=== Pesterquest ===
Pesterquest followed on September 4, 2019, continuing the visual-novel format established by Friendsim. The game features episodic chapters now centered around Homestuck characters rather than Hiveswap characters. It was also released for PC via Steam. Fellow Traveller Games also released Pesterquest on December 7, 2023 for the Nintendo Switch, the PlayStation 4, and the PlayStation 5.
