= Jeffrey Rowland =

American artist and author

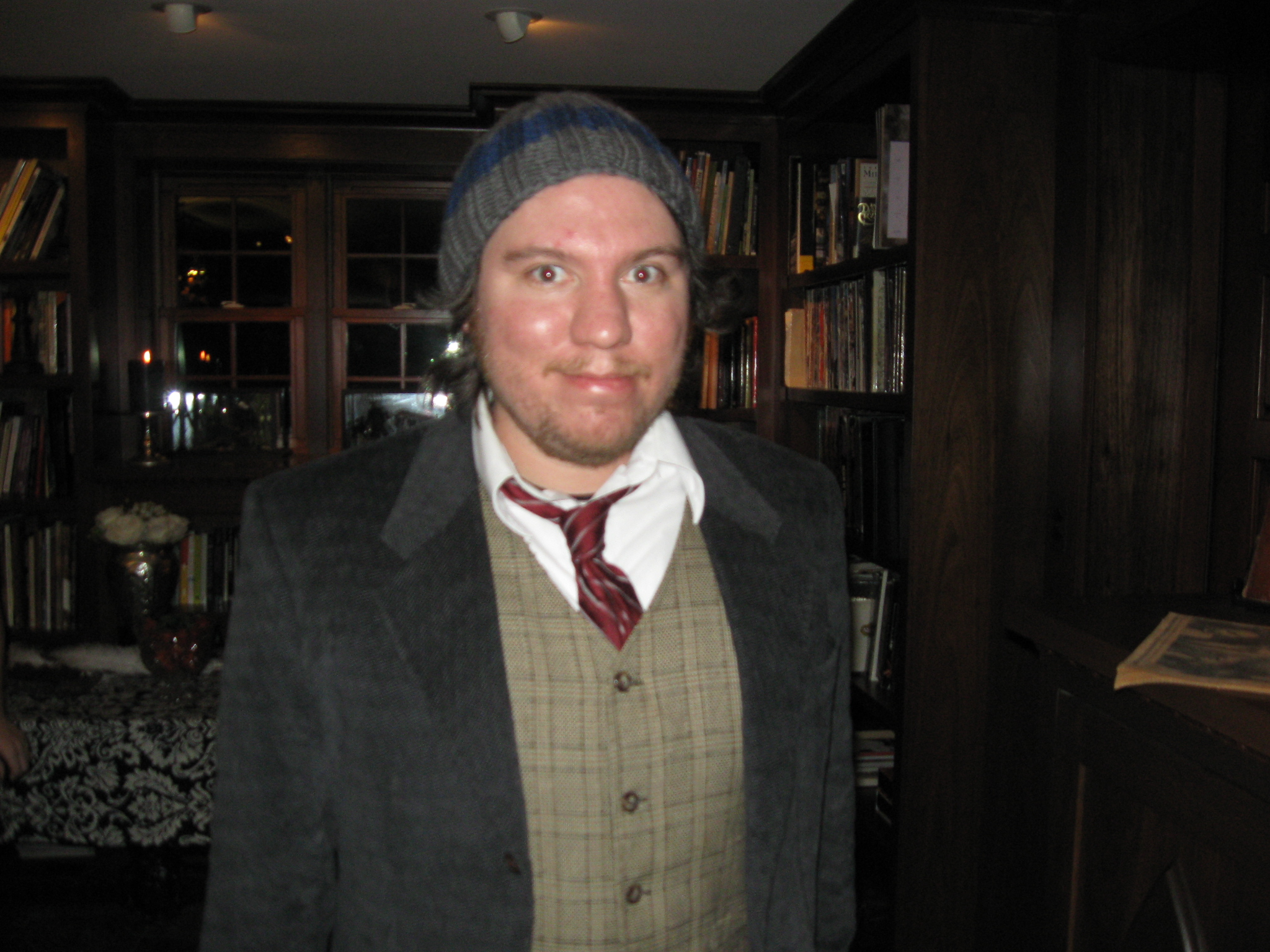
- Rowland in 2009
- Born: Jeffrey J. Rowland; May 22, 1974 (age 51)
- Occupations: Author, artist
- Known for: The webcomics Wigu and Overcompensating

Jeffrey J. Rowland (born May 22, 1974) is the author and artist responsible for Wigu and Overcompensating, two popular webcomics. Originally from Locust Grove, Oklahoma, Rowland now lives in Easthampton, Massachusetts, where he continues to work on the two projects, while running TopatoCo, a company which sells merchandise based on his and other artists' comics.

Jeffrey Rowland's comics are part of the TopatoCo network, along with comics such as Dinosaur Comics and MS Paint Adventures. Rowland can be considered one of the small number of professional webcartoonists, as running Overcompensating and Wigu, in addition to his merchandise company TopatoCo, is his full-time job and source of income.

== Comics ==
Rowland's comics were used along with Penny Arcade, Fetus-X and Questionable Content as an example of comics using the web to create "an explosion of diverse genres and styles" in Scott McCloud's 2006 book Making Comics

=== When I Grow Up ===
When I Grow Up is a webcomic written by Rowland, which ran from June 14, 1999 until January 1, 2002. It takes place in the fictional town of Shallow Brook, Oklahoma. The main characters were Neal, a young African American scientist working for the U.S. government; Roger, an unemployed slacker; Zoe, a selfish, bitter newscaster; and Gina, a college student and part-time employee of a video store.

The structure of When I Grow Up is very similar that of Rowland's second comic, Wigu. It includes five different story arcs, which are often interrupted by short stories or single strips.

When I Grow Up was hosted on Keenspot for some time, but Rowland eventually moved it to his own server.

=== Wigu ===
Wigu was a webcomic created by Jeffrey Rowland. It was publicly launched on January 7, 2002 and was also part of the Dumbrella bulletin board. Wigu is the successor to When I Grow Up and derives its name from the earlier strip's initials. There have been some guest appearances from When I Grow Up, but Wigu is otherwise a different comic with a new set of characters.

The comic is centered on the adventures of a little boy named Wigu Tinkle and his family. Each chapter of the comic represents one day in Wigu's life. Wigu is an intelligent child with an active imagination who uses much of his free time to watch television and play video games, where he encounters the beings of Butter Dimension³, primarily the intergalactic heroes Topato (a flying potato whose catchphrase is "Spring into action!" and whose primary defense mechanism consists of being made entirely of poison) and Sheriff Pony (an eloquent Space Pony who, as the storyline reveals, excretes vanilla ice cream instead of fecal waste. Topato excretes sour cream, which he also uses to shave).

Wigu was nominated for the 2004 Web Cartoonists' Choice Awards categories Outstanding Short Form Comic and Outstanding Story Concept. Wigu was originally intended to end on December 31, 2004, but resumed on April 18, 2005. The webcomic ended again on December 31, 2005 so that Rowland could continue the title as a series of printed books. It was intended that there be a new book every month, but due to various delays, only three have been published, and Wigu returned to its original online format on November 22, 2006.

=== Overcompensating ===
On September 19, 2004, Rowland began another comic, Overcompensating, a journal/daily blog comic about his life. Overcompensating, though clearly fictitious, does appear to have some reality in it. Caricatures of real life people such as Richard Stevens, John Allison and Vera Brosgol make appearances, while other characters, such as Baby, do not exist. In April 2005, Rowland predicted and then 'faked' his death by having Weedmaster P, a character in the strip, update the comic, posting that Rowland had died.

== TopatoCo ==
Rowland is the owner and operator of the web merchant TopatoCo, which sells T-shirts, stickers, magnets, comics, hoodies, tote bags, and other items for a number of webcomics. As of May 2012, TopatoCo sells merchandise for over 40 different comics. Comics that TopatoCo represents include Questionable Content, Dinosaur Comics, MS Paint Adventures, Wondermark, and Sam and Fuzzy. Rowland currently operates TopatoCo out of a large warehouse in Easthampton, Massachusetts. The various cardboard box-related adventures of running the business play a large part in Rowland's comic Overcompensating.
