= Andrew Hussie =

American author and webcomic artist (born 1979)

- Hussie in 2025
- Born: August 25, 1979 (age 47)
- Education: Temple University
- Occupations: Author; artist
- Years active: 2003–present
- Notable work: MS Paint Adventures; Homestuck
- Website: homestuck.com

Andrew F. Hussie (born August 25, 1979) is an American author and artist. They (Note: Hussie uses any/all pronouns. This article uses they/them for consistency.) are best known for creating the webcomic Homestuck, hosted on their website MS Paint Adventures alongside other works styled after text-based graphic adventure games.

In 2009, Hussie began creating Homestuck and updated it until its conclusion in 2016. During its run, Homestuck's website would sometimes see up to a million unique visitors a day. In 2017, Hussie helped produce Hiveswap, a Homestuck adventure game that crowdfunded over US$2.4 million on Kickstarter. In 2019, an epilogue for Homestuck would be released for free digitally in addition to a later physical print by Viz Media. In 2021, Hussie would create and self-publish Psycholonials, a visual novel inspired by their personal experiences as a fandom "leader".

== Life and career ==
=== 1979–2009: Early life and work ===
Andrew F. Hussie was born on August 25, 1979. Hussie graduated in computer science at Temple University while living with their parents in Abington, Pennsylvania. In 2005, they would develop Photoshop plugins under the company Master Colors, implementing a digital color space based on the Munsell color system. As of 2010, Hussie lives in Massachusetts.

Hussie began posting webcomics in 2003 on their website Team Special Olympics up until its discontinuation in 2007. The site would host various comic strips by Hussie, their brother, and Cindy Marie. Notable works that were showcased on the site include And It Don't Stop, Whistles: The Starlight Calliope, and Neon Ice Cream Headache. The Starlight Calliope would later be published by Slave Labor Graphics.

Hussie's first interactive work, Jailbreak, began on an internet forum in 2006, taking user input on character actions in the form of commands, mimicking a text-based graphical adventure game. Hussie would then quickly respond with a drawn image depicting the results of the command, often with an added caption. In 2007, Hussie would create the website MS Paint Adventures to host Jailbreak and future works in this interactive format. These later works include Bard Quest and Problem Sleuth. Problem Sleuth launched in 2008 and ran for over a year, ending in 2009 with more than 1,600 pages. During its run, Hussie would sometimes be creating up to 10 pages a day.

=== 2009–2016: Homestuck ===
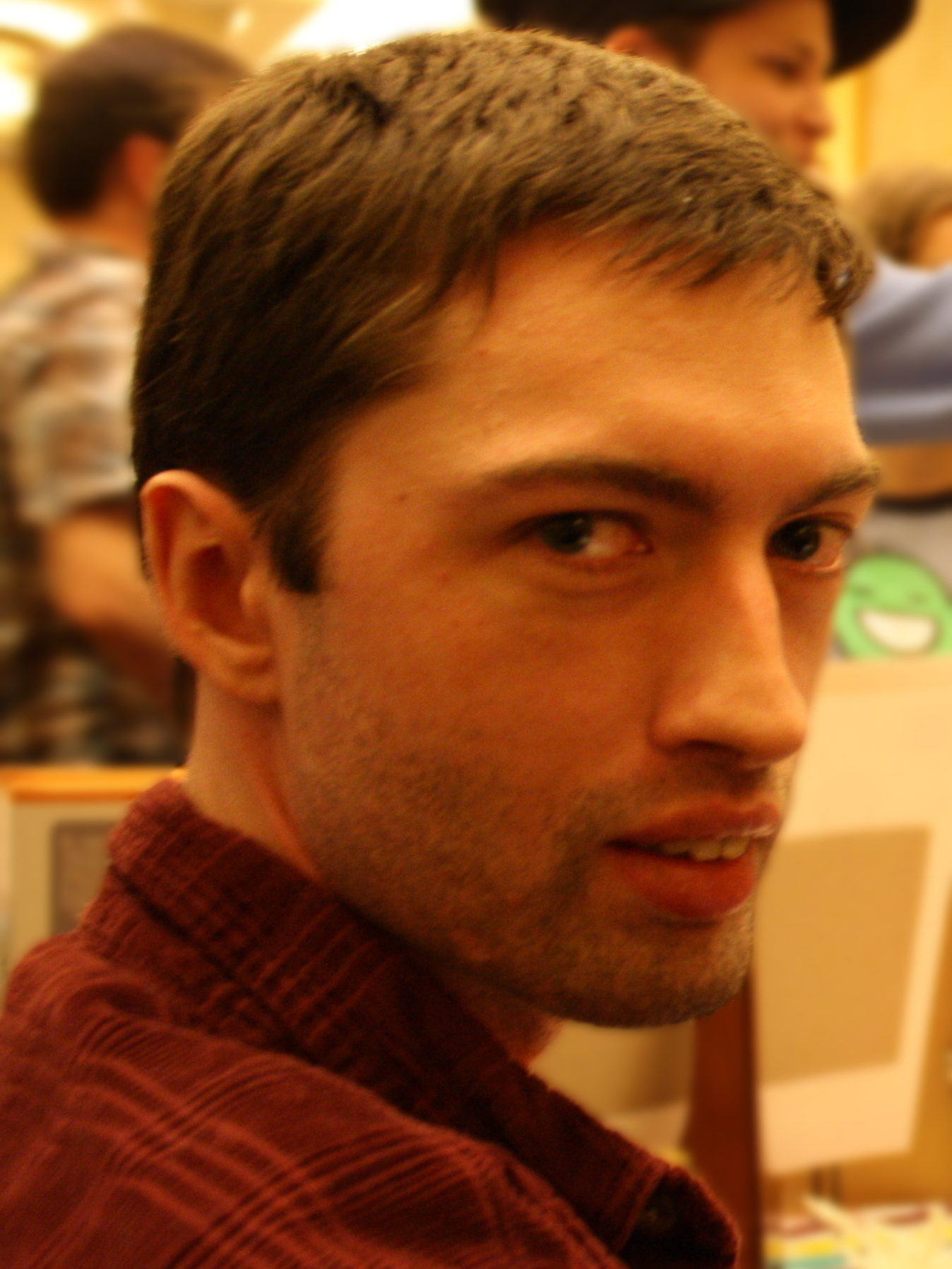
Hussie (pictured in 2010, left) is depicted in Homestuck through their author surrogate (right)

Hussie began creating Homestuck in the form of a so-called "beta" on April 10th, 2009, only 3 days after the conclusion of Problem Sleuth. The comic would officially begin shortly thereafter on April 13th, 2009. As with Hussie's previous works, Homestuck took input from its readers in the form of commands that could guide character actions. As the audience grew to almost a million daily readers through word of mouth, taking reader input became "too unwieldy and made it difficult [...] to tell a coherent story". Hussie would later make use of an author surrogate to insert themself into the story and interact with the audience, taking the responsibility for killing off fan-favorite characters before eventually dying in the comic themself. While Hussie now controlled the plot through their discontinuation of the suggestion box, they claimed to still visit fan blogs and forums when interested in audience feedback.

Fans would continue to directly contribute to Homestuck in a number of ways, including its original soundtrack with over 500 tracks. Over a hundred musicians and artists contributed to the final work, with Hussie sometimes recruiting community artists for new pages.

During Homestuck's run, Hussie would update the comic regularly, sometimes posting upwards of 10 to 20 pages in a day. Updates to the comic would eventually slow down to steady increments, about three times each week. The comic would experience two extended hiatuses in 2013 and 2015 respectively, the former lasting a year. Hussie described working on Homestuck as an "all-encompassing lifestyle", saying that the time they spend on the work occupied something just short of all their waking hours. Homestuck would conclude its main story on April 13th, 2016.

=== 2017–present: After Homestuck ===
In 2017, Hiveswap was released, an episodic adventure game that raised US$2.4 million in 2012 through crowdfunding on Kickstarter. The first act of the game released in 2017 with its second act releasing in 2020. Hussie is credited as a writer and executive producer on the game.

In April 2019, Hussie would help co-write and release The Homestuck Epilogues, a novel set after the conclusion of the Homestuck webcomic. The Homestuck Epilogues were originally released as a free addition to the comic's site with a later physical print by Viz Media. An official webcomic continuation of Homestuck titled Homestuck^2: Beyond Canon would be outlined by Hussie and handed off to a new team in late 2019 before going on indefinite pause in 2020. In late 2023, the comic would rebrand to Homestuck: Beyond Canon and resume updates under the direction of Furthest Ring Studios.

Hussie in 2020 during the production of Psycholonials.

In 2020, Hussie announced Psycholonials, a self-published visual novel that released its final episode in April 2021. The game follows the story of Zhen and Abby, two girls that try to wrestle with a messy clown-themed revolution during the COVID-19 pandemic. The plot of Psycholonials was inspired by Hussie's experience as the "leader" of the Homestuck fandom, which they found comparable to a cult at times. In Psycholonials, Hussie explores what a modern path to revolution could look like with the involvement of internet culture. After the release of Psycholonials, Hussie would begin presenting themself in clown makeup, describing it as their own version of the character Zhen's "rebrand" in the game.

In 2025, Hussie helped write the Homestuck animated pilot with independent animation studio SpindleHorse. Hussie had contacted Vivienne Medrano – the founder of the studio – about the possibility of a collaboration, which then became the animated pilot. Hussie will continue to be involved in the adaptation of the comic if the series is continued beyond the pilot.

== Works ==
=== Webcomics ===
| Series | Year | Title | Status | Ref. |
|---|---|---|---|---|
| Team Special Olympics | 2005 | Whistles | Incomplete | |
| MS Paint Adventures | 2006–2011 | Jailbreak | Complete | |
| MS Paint Adventures | 2007 | Bard Quest | Incomplete | |
| MS Paint Adventures | 2008–2009 | Problem Sleuth | Complete | |
| MS Paint Adventures | 2009–2016 | Homestuck | Complete | |
| MS Paint Adventures | 2009–present | Sweet Bro and Hella Jeff | Ongoing | |
| MS Paint Adventures | 2025 | Jester Quest | Complete | |

=== Published books ===
- Whistles, Book One (The Starlight Calliope) (out of print, available online) ISBN 978-1-59362-073-8
- Problem Sleuth (Five volumes, which cover all 22 chapters)
  - Volume One: Compensation, Adequate ISBN 978-0-9824862-3-8
  - Volume Two: This is Complete BS ISBN 978-1-936561-00-1
  - Volume Three: Suitor to the Sodajerk's Confidante ISBN 978-1-936561-80-3
  - Volume Four: Black Liquid Sorrow ISBN 978-1-936561-85-8
  - Volume Five: Sepulchritude ISBN 978-1-936561-11-7
- Homestuck
  - By TopatoCo (three volumes, which cover Acts 1, 2, and 3, respectively)
    - Volume One ISBN 978-1-936561-82-7
    - Volume Two ISBN 978-1-936561-83-4
    - Volume Three ISBN 978-1-936561-10-0
  - By Viz Media
    - Book 1: Act 1 & Act 2 ISBN 978-1-4215-9940-3
    - Book 2: Act 3 & Intermission ISBN 978-1-4215-9939-7
    - Book 3: Act 4 ISBN 978-1-4215-9941-0
    - Book 4: Act 5 Act 1 ISBN 978-1-4215-9942-7
    - Book 5: Act 5 Act 2 Part 1 ISBN 978-1-4215-9943-4
    - Book 6: Act 5 Act 2 Part 2 ISBN 978-1-9747-0650-1
    - The Homestuck Epilogues: Volume Meat / Volume Candy (2020) ISBN 978-1-9747-0108-7
- Sweet Bro and Hella Jeff ISBN 978-1936561-03-2

=== Video games ===
| Year | Title | Credited as | Ref. |
|---|---|---|---|
| 2013 | Namco High | Creative director | |
| 2017 | Hiveswap: Act 1 | Executive producer, writer | |
| 2018 | Hiveswap Friendsim | Director, writer | |
| 2019 | Pesterquest | Executive producer, writer, background artist | |
| 2020 | Hiveswap: Act 2 | Director, executive producer, programmer | |
| 2021 | Psycholonials | Writer, artist | |
| 2026 | Troubled Cosmos | Writer, artist | |
