= The Adventures of Dr. McNinja =

Webcomic

- Author(s): Christopher Hastings, inked by Christopher Hastings (2010–2017), formerly inked by Kent Archer (2006–2010), colored by Carly Monardo (2008–2009), colored by Anthony "Nedroid" Clark (2009–2017)
- Website: drmcninja.com
- Current status/schedule: Completed
- Launch date: August 3, 2004
- End date: January 19, 2017
- Publisher: Raptor Bandit Industries
- Genre(s): Action, comedy, superhero

The Adventures of Dr. McNinja is a webcomic written and drawn by Christopher Hastings, and inked formerly by Kent Archer and after 2010 by Hastings himself. Published three times a week on its own website, it features the fictional adventures of a character named Dr. McNinja, a thirty-five-year-old doctor who is also a ninja. Dr. McNinja is highly story-driven, with twenty- to ninety-page issues. The first story was published in the summer of 2004 as a one-off, and the comic was published regularly from 2005 to 2017.

The Adventures of Dr. McNinja is a member of Dayfree Press.

== History ==
In 2003, when Chris Hastings was a forum member of Something Awful Forums, his screen name was "Dr. McNinja". During a drawing contest involving a characterization of user screen names, Hastings drew an image of Dr. McNinja behind his desk with a sword on his wall and a speech bubble reading, "Should anyone need the services of a ninja or a doctor, my office is always open." Shortly afterward, Chris made a full-length comic about McNinja for an art class.

Strips were presented in a high contrast black-and-white, and then for a period of time were shaded digitally. Starting in August 2008, comics began to be drawn in full color, provided by Carly Monardo (the author's wife). In February 2009, Monardo stepped down to focus on her job on The Venture Bros., and Anthony "Nedroid" Clark replaced Monardo.

== List of characters ==
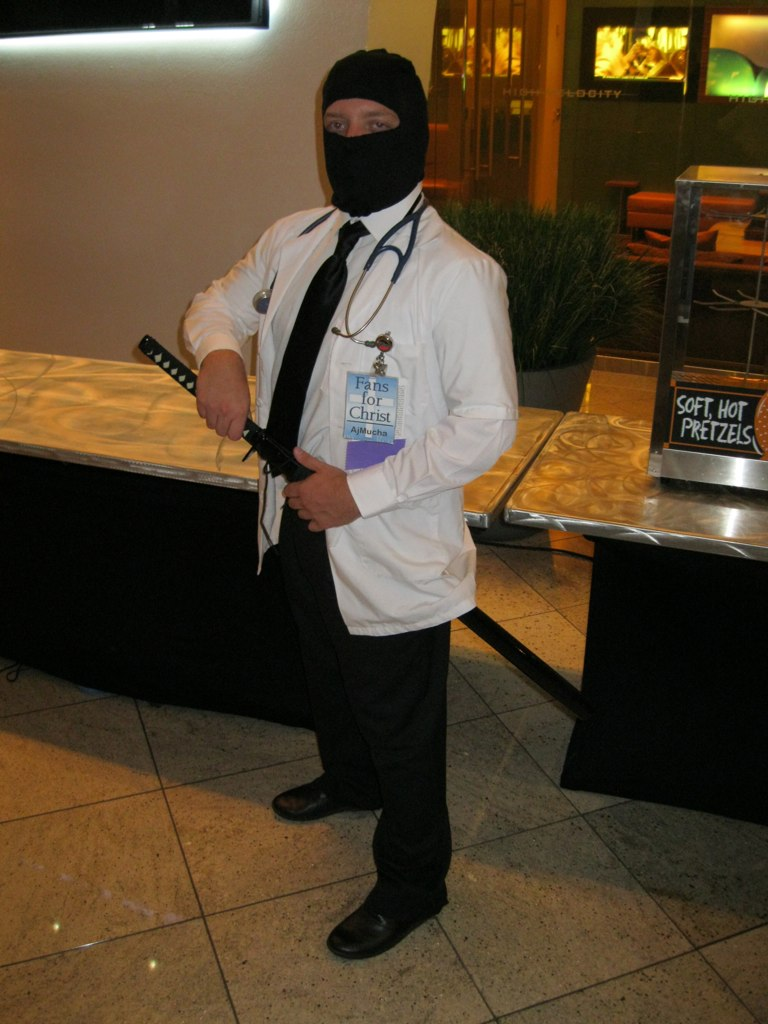
A cosplayer as Dr. McNinja

=== McNinja family and associates ===
Dr. Patrick McNinja
A cliché ninja as well as a practicing medical doctor whose medical expertise ranges from general medicine to podiatry and dentistry. He is usually seen wearing slacks, a button-down shirt and tie, a lab coat, a ninja mask, and a stethoscope around his neck. He is 35 years old. Though Dr. McNinja's full face is never seen, he has blue eyes and auburn eyebrows.

Gordito Delgado
A 12-year-old Mexican boy whom Dr. McNinja took on as a sidekick at the end of the third storyline. His last name, Delgado, was revealed on his grave stone on Hastings' April Fool's page. His first name means "little fatty" in Spanish, while the last name is the Spanish adjective for "thin" (making his name an oxymoron).

Judy
A large gorilla and Dr. McNinja's secretary and receptionist, she is extremely strong and possesses intelligence comparable to a human; she cannot speak, but she can not only understand spoken English but also read and write and even perform emergency first aid and blood transfusions. She can also communicate with sign language and operate machinery.

Yoshi
Dr. McNinja's Velociraptor, named after the Nintendo character Yoshi. Yoshi can be more accurately described as a Deinonychus, and should be portrayed with feathers, but Chris Hastings has stated in the alt-text of "There is a Raptor in My Office" on page 7 that this confuses his brain and he is just going by the Jurassic Park version.

Dan McNinja
Dr. McNinja's father, an Irish-American ninja who is disappointed by his son's choice to be a doctor.

Mitzi McNinja
Dr. McNinja's mother, a Jewish-American "convert" to the McNinja clan who strongly disapproves of her son's choice to be a doctor.

Sean "Dark Smoke Puncher" McNinja
Dr. McNinja's younger brother, named after the author's brother, Sean Hastings.

Old McNinja
One of many clones of Dr. McNinja created by Ben Franklin II, he became a farmer and expert in agricultural science.

=== Antagonists ===
Donald McBonald
An evil mime who owns a fast-food empire and is similar to Ronald McDonald in appearance but with blue hair and thinner red makeup. Initially, Hastings actually used the famous character, but as the comic became more popular he retroactively altered the character's name and appearance to avoid any future copyright issues.

Frans Rayner
An enemy of Dr. McNinja who appears to be inspired by parodies of Michael Dudikoff – especially the American Ninja films – and Jean-Claude Van Damme in films such as Bloodsport.

Dr. Knickerbockers
A dwarf scientist who works for Frans Rayner.

Dracula
An old Transylvanian vampire and an homage to Count Dracula.

Hortense
Dr. McNinja's athletic redheaded ninja ex-girlfriend from college.

King Radical
Formerly Sir Sicknasty of Spades and Chuck Goodrich, a crime boss that dresses in a style similar to a stereotypical playing-card King of Spades.

Sparklelord
An evil unicorn and King Radical's primary antagonist.

Nasaghasts
Astronauts who have been exposed to "space radiation". They have the physical properties of astronauts surrounded by black smoke that follows them wherever they go. They can also use this smoke to change their size and form, indicating that they can make the smoke solid or gaseous at will. Inside their helmet is a floating skull which is capable of movement. Nasaghasts communicate telepathically.

=== Other ===
Benjamin Franklin II
A clone of Benjamin Franklin who taught Dr. McNinja various schools of medicine.

Death
The personification of "death", a skeleton in a maître d’ outfit.

Martin Monster
Martin attended the same college as Dr. McNinja, was his superhero teammate, and is the owner of a series of supermarkets. He can transform between the forms of human and monster, much like The Incredible Hulk. Stress causes his transformation to become unstable, eventually leaving him stuck partially-transformed between human and monster. Upon becoming truly enraged, his monster form is significantly larger and more powerful.

Chuck Goodrich
A former astronaut, the mayor of Cumberland, and a time traveler.

Dr. McLuchador
He has a similar appearance to Doctor McNinja, save that his tie is golden-colored yellow, and he wears a yellow Luchadore-style mask. He also appears somewhat burlier, has a swarthier complexion, brown eyes and black eyebrows.

== In print ==
The first three volumes of Dr. McNinja are published and sold online by TopatoCo. Dark Horse Comics took over publishing beginning with the fourth volume, although Dark Horse numbers their volumes of the series as Vol. 1, Vol. 2, etc. All of the printed comics include comics not available on the Dr. McNinja website.

- Volume 1, The Adventures of Dr. McNinja, contains the first three issues Meet the Doctor and his Friendly Staff, So what is a McNinja?, and There is a Raptor in My Office, as well as some bonus material including a comic created for .Net Magazine and alt text for Meet the Doctor and his Friendly Staff, not present in the original web version.
- Volume 2, Dr. McNinja: Surgical Strike, contains parts one and two of D.A.R.E. To Resist Ninja Drugs and Ninja Violence, with bonus comic Black Ninja White Ninja.
- Volume 3, Operation Dracula! From Outer Space, contains the issues Revenge of the Hundred Dead Ninja, I Told You That Story so I Could Tell You This One, Spooky Stuff, and Punch Dracula, with bonus comic A Death in the Family.
- Volume 4, Night Powers, contains Monster Mart, Death Volley, and Doc gets Rad, with bonus comic Beyond Winter Wonderdome.
- Volume 5, Timefist, contains Army of One, Judy Gets a Kitten, Space Savers, Future Trading, and includes the Axe Cop crossover with the Nicolle brothers, Stolen Pizza, Stolen Lives.
- Volume 6, King Radical, contains AWOL MD, A Cumberland Ninja in King Radical's Court, All the King's Dirtbikes and All the King's Men, and a bonus new prologue comic.

== Awards ==
Dr. McNinja won the 2007 Web Cartoonists' Choice Award for Outstanding Superhero / Action Comic.

== Proposed video game ==
In April 2012, Christopher Hastings entered a partnership with Fat Cat Gameworks to create a video game based on the comic for mobile and web. Titled Dr. McNinja's Radical Adventures, it was slated for release by that July. The project used the Kickstarter platform for funding, to avoid the need for a publisher, but the project never came to fruition due to financial issues.

== See also ==
- Pirates versus Ninjas
