= Music of Homestuck =

Discography for a multimedia webcomic

The 2009 webcomic Homestuck, written and drawn by Andrew Hussie, currently holds a soundtrack consisting of 30 digital albums. Besides static images, Homestuck makes use of flash animations and games, which often involve background music. The music of Homestuck is composed by fans, but is published by Hussie through his Bandcamp page under the What Pumpkin record label. Hussie established a small "Music Contribution Team" for the webcomic, which is coordinated by Toby Fox.

== Production ==
"Homestuck Anthem"
Iterations of Powell's "Homestuck Anthem" are used at key turning points of Homestuck's plot.

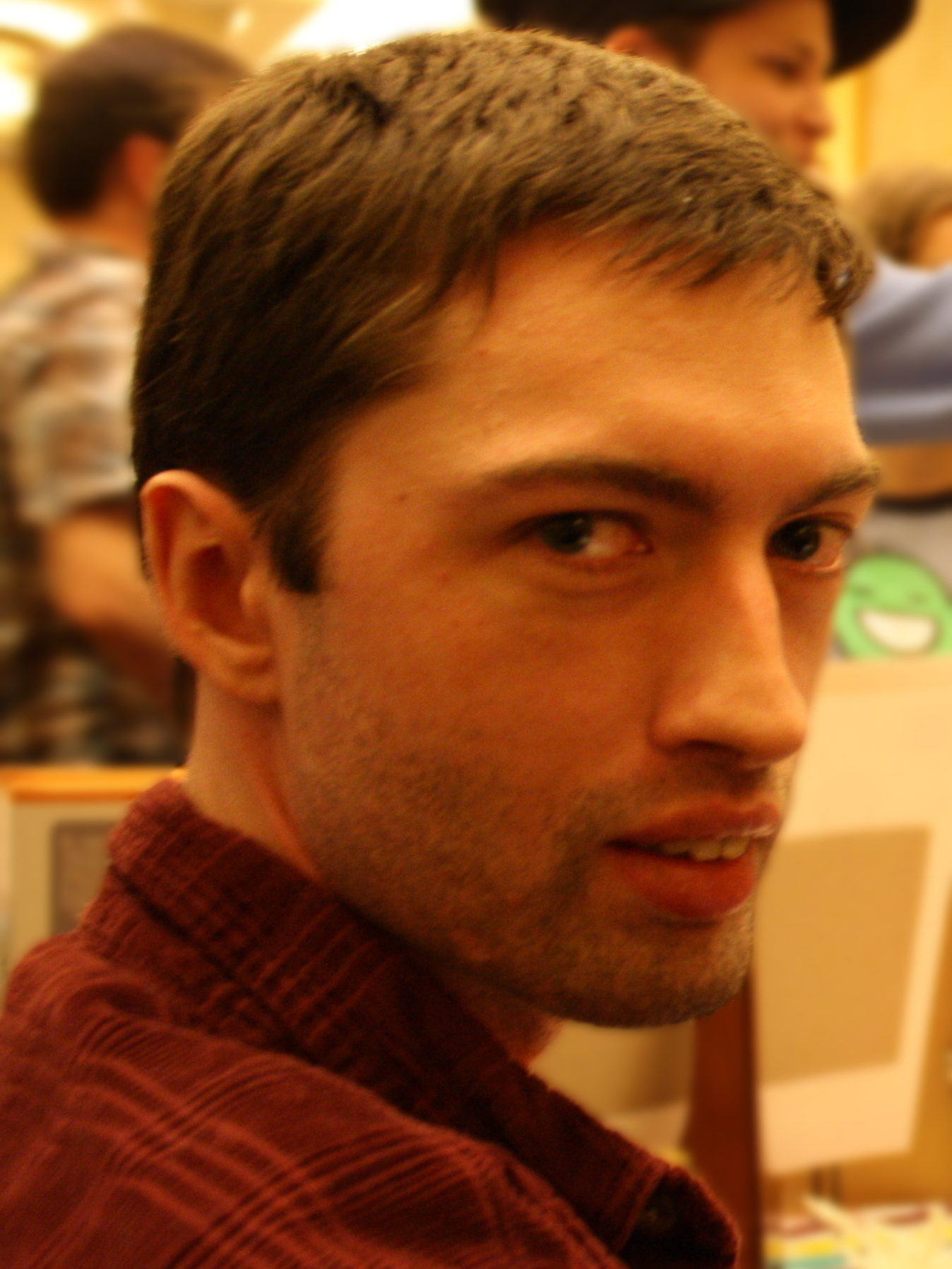
Andrew Hussie in 2010 (left) and Toby Fox in 2017

The first piece of music ever featured on MS Paint Adventures was a fan-made title theme for Problem Sleuth, created by later-Slender: The Eight Pages-developer Mark J. Hadley. While starting Homestuck, Andrew Hussie posted an open invitation for composers on the MS Paint Adventures forums. Clark Powell, the creator of the "Homestuck Anthem", responded to this call, becoming a member of the "Music Contribution Team". Jeremy "Solatrus" Iamurri's work on Homestuck's music gave him the exposure needed to become a professional musician.

After he posted various piano covers on a Homestuck fan forum, Hussie reached out to Toby Fox – who later went on to create the video game Undertale – to produce music for the webcomic's flash animations. The piece "Megalovania", which Fox initially composed for an EarthBound ROM hack titled Radiation Halloween Hack in 2008, was used in Homestuck as well as Undertale. Fox recounts that he set a goal for himself to get his music featured in the webcomic, predicting the direction the story would take and sending in music that would be relevant in the predicted situations. In an interview with Polygon, Fox said that "Over time I kind of established that I 'get' what [Hussie] wants pretty well," which eventually led him to the role of production coordinator for music.

Hussie wrote on his Tumblr blog that he never gives artists or musicians context when requesting input, keeping his requests vague by only suggesting a change in tempo or the inclusion of a leitmotif. According to Fox, Hussie creates animations in Homestuck based on the music he receives rather than the other way around. He described this as the most rewarding aspect of creating music for the webcomic: "seeing what visuals he creates to go with the audio after imagining your own."

The music of Homestuck is published through Hussie's own record label "What Pumpkin". With the music released on Bandcamp, payment is split between Hussie and the album creators. As the popularity of Homestuck rose, more fans requested to be on the Music Contribution Team; however, Hussie chose to keep the team a fixed size, and closed it to new members. Only team members are legally allowed to profit from Homestuck-related commissions.

Fans of Homestuck have created a large amount of filk music based on the webcomic and its soundtrack. Aja Romano of The Huffington Post stated that Homestuck filk music is frequently paired with "skilled video editing," producing "wondrous results."

== Reception ==
Harper described Song of Skaia as a "cosmically soppy" album.

Adam Harper of The Fader has described the music of Homestuck as "subtly evad[ing] genre, skipping through all kinds of sound worlds, seemingly guided more by emotion ... than form." He pointed at One Year Older and Song of Skaia as oddly mesmerizing albums. Furthermore, Harper described the digitally painted album artwork as "bizarre" and praised What Pumpkin's "weirdly great-looking" Bandcamp page.

Reid Gacke of Only Single Player rated Toby Fox' "Megalovania" as one of the best video game songs in 2015, noting that it was initially part of the Homestuck soundtrack before being recreated for Undertale. Gacke has also noted that Homestuck has "better video game music than many video games."

== Discography ==
32 (Note: The first four volumes of the soundtrack were later removed from sale and compiled into the Vol. 1-4 release, which featured several additional tracks. Several tracks from the original releases were not included in the compilation, due to either disputes with the composer or to being shortened versions of tracks already present on the album.) albums were released on Bandcamp through the What Pumpkin record label, aggregating to 625 (Note: This number does not include the tracks present on the original Vol. 1-4 that were not present on the compilation, or the songs removed from Vol. 5.) total tracks.

Title	Composer	Release
Homestuck Vol. 1	Andrew Huo, Curt Blakeslee, George Buzinkai, Kevin Regamey, Malcolm Brown, Mark Hadley, and Michael Guy Bowman	9 August 2009
Homestuck Vol. 2	Bill Bolin, David Ko, Gabe Nezovic, George Buzinkai, Michael Guy Bowman, and Robert Blaker	14 December 2009
Homestuck Vol. 3	Bill Bolin, BurnedKirby, Curt Blakeslee, David Ko, Gabe Nezovic, Malcolm Brown, Michael Guy Bowman, and Nick Smalley	15 December 2009
Midnight Crew: Drawing Dead	Alexander Rosetti, Andrew Huo, Clark "Plazmataz" Powell, David Ko, Gabe Nezovic, Hilary "Pie" Troiano, Ian Taylor, Kevin Regamey, Mark Hadley, Michael Guy Bowman, Robert J! Lake, and Toby "Radiation" Fox	4 February 2010
Homestuck Vol. 4	Andrew Huo, Bill Bolin, George Buzinkai, Malcolm Brown, Mark Hadley, Michael Guy Bowman, Robert J! Lake, and Toby "Radiation" Fox	13 April 2010
Homestuck Vol. 5	Alexander Rosetti, Andrew Huo, Clark "Plazmataz" Powell, David Ko, Erik "Jit" Scheele, Gabe Nezovic, Jared Micks (Note: Jared Micks' contributions to the album were removed after it was discovered that one of them was an unauthorized remix of a non-Homestuck song.), Jeremy "Solatrus" Iamurri, Mark Hadley, Micheal Guy Bowman, Perry Sullivan, Robert Blaker, Robert J! Lake, Seth "Beatfox" Peelle, Steve Everson, Toby "Radiation" Fox, and Tyler "Seppuku" Dever (Note: Also contains a cover by Michael Guy Bowman of How Do I Live, written by Diane Warren.)	23 June 2010
Alternia	Toby "Radiation" Fox	18 July 2010
Squiddles!	Alexander Rosetti, David Ko, Erik "Jit" Scheele, Ian Taylor, Jeremy "Solatrus" Iamurri, Malcolm Brown, Mark Hadley, Michael Guy Bowman, Nick Smalley, Robert J! Lake, Seth "Beatfox" Peelle, Steve Everson, and Toby "Radiation" Fox	26 August 2010
The Felt	Alexander Rosetti, Clark "Plazmataz" Powell, David Ko, Erik "Jit" Scheele, Jeremy "Solatrus" Iamurri, Mark Hadley, Robert J! Lake, Thomas "EidolonOrpheus" Ferkol, and Toby "Radiation" Fox	2 December 2010
Homestuck Vol. 6: Heir Transparent	Alexander Rosetti, Clark "Plazmataz" Powell, David Ko, Erik "Jit" Scheele, Jeremy "Solatrus" Iamurri, Joren "Tensei" de Bruin, Mark Hadley, Michael Guy Bowman, Robert J! Lake, Seth "Beatfox" Peelle, and Toby "Radiation" Fox (Note: Also contains a cover by Michael Guy Bowman of I Don't Want to Miss a Thing, written by Diane Warren.)	5 January 2011
Strife!	Joren "Tensei" de Bruin	16 February 2011
Alterniabound	Alexander Rosetti, David Ko, Erik "Jit" Scheele, Joren "Tensei" de Bruin, Malcolm Brown, Mark Hadley, Peter "abortedSlunk" Turner, Seat "Beatfox" Peelle, Thomas "EidolonOrpheus" Ferkol, and Toby "Radiation" Fox	14 March 2011
Medium	Clark "Plazmataz" Powell	14 April 2011
Mobius Trip and Hadron Kaleido	Michael Guy Bowman	31 May 2011
Homestuck Vol. 7: At the Price of Oblivion	Clark "Plazmataz" Powell, Erik "Jit" Scheele, Joren "Tensei" de Bruin, Malcolm Brown, Mark Hadley, Michael Guy Bowman, Robert Blaker, Robert J! Lake, Thomas "EidolonOrpheus" Ferkol, and Toby "Radiation" Fox	31 May 2011
Sburb	Tyler Dever	13 July 2011
The Wanderers	Alexander Rosetti, David Ko, Erik "Jit" Scheele, Jeremy "Solatrus" Iamurri, Joren "Tensei" de Bruin, Malcolm Brown, Michael Guy Bowman, Nick Smalley, Robert J! Lake, Seth "Beatfox" Peelle, Steve Everson, Toby "Radiation" Fox, and Tyler Dever	14 July 2011
Prospit & Derse	Jeremy "Solatrus" Iamurri	22 August 2011
Homestuck Vol. 1-4	Andrew Huo, BurnedKirby, Curt Blakeslee, David Ko, Gabe Nezovic, George Buzinkai, Kevin Regamey, Malcolm Brown, Mark Hadley, Michael Guy Bowman, Nick Smalley, Robert Blaker, Robert J! Lake, Steve Everson, and Toby "Radiation" Fox	24 October 2011
Homestuck Vol. 8	Clark "Plazmataz" Powell, David Ko, Erik "Jit" Scheele, Hilary "Pie" Troiano, Jeremy "Solatrus" Iamurri, John "Tensei" de Bruin, Malcolm Brown, Mark Hadley, Michael Guy Bowman, Nick Smalley, Robert J! Lake, Seth "Beatfox" Peelle, Svix, Thomas Ferkol, Toby "Radiation" Fox, and Tyler Dever	25 October 2011
Song of Skaia	Mark Hadley	1 January 2012
coloUrs and mayhem: Universe A	Dallas Ross Hicks, David "Dirtiest" Dycus, DJ 最テー, Eston "silence" Schweickart, First Turn Fold, Frank Haught, Gec (Eligecos), Ian "MyUsernamesMud" White, James "soselfimportant" Roach, Kera L. Jones, Kevin "UWBW" Grant, Magnum (CharredAsperity), Marcus Carline, Max "Imbrog" Wright, Nathan "EbonHawk7x" H, Paul Tuttle Starr, Plumegeist, Rachael Macwhirter, Ray McDougall, repeatedScales, Samm Nieland, Sinister Psyche, Toby "Radiation" Fox, William Ascenzo, and Yan "Nucleose" Rodriguez	2 April 2012
coloUrs and mayhem: Universe B	Brian Schaefer, David "Dirtiest" Dycus, David DeCou, David Ellis (A Lunatic's Daydream), Elaine "OJ" Wang, Elisa "Moony" McCabe, Elliot "TheLastBanana" Colp, Gabe "zorg" Stilez, Gec, Haunter, infiniteKnife, James "soselfimportant" Roach, Kris "Astarus" Flacke, Liam O'Donnell, Mai Yishan, Marcy "Shadolith" Nabors, Max "Imbrog" Wright, Maya Kern, Monobrow, Nathan "EbonHawk7x" H., Plumegeist, Ryan Ames, Shandy, Solarbear, The Black Curtain, Thomas Ibarra (AutoDevote, SparksD2145), Toby "Radiation" Fox, Tristan Scroggins, viaSatellite, and Will Kommor	13 April 2012
Homestuck Vol. 9	A Lunatic's Daydream, Alexander Rosetti, Astro Kid, Clark Powell, Erik "Jit" Scheele, George Buzinkai, Jeremy "Solatrus" Iamurri, Malcolm Brown, Mark Hadley, Michael Guy Bowman, Nick Smalley, Robert Blaker, Robert J! Lake, Seth "Beatfox" Peelle, Svix, Thomas Ferkol, Toby "Radiation" Fox, and Tyler Dever	12 June 2012
Symphony Impossible to Play	Clark "Plazmataz" Powell	12 August 2012
One Year Older	Erik "Jit" Scheele	15 August 2012
Genesis Frog	Alexander Rosetti	23 October 2012
Cherubim	Alexander Rosetti, Clark "Plazmataz" Powell, Erik "Jit" Scheele, Malcolm Brown, Michael Guy Bowman, Robert Blaker, Robert J! Lake, Thomas "EidolonOrpheus" Ferkol, and Toby "Radiation" Fox	14 April 2013
[S] Collide.	Joren "Tensei" De Bruin, Malcolm Brown, Seth "Beatfox" Peelle, and Toby "Radiation" Fox	6 April 2016
Act 7	Clark Powell and Toby Fox	13 April 2016
Homestuck Vol. 10	Alexander Rosetti, Astro Kid, Clark Powell, Curt Blakeslee, David "Dirtiest" Dycus, Ducksual, Erik Scheele, George Buzinkai, Kalibration, Luke Benjamins, Malcolm Brown, Marcy Nabors, Mark Hadley, Max Wright, Michael Guy Bowman, Robert J! Lake, Seth "Beatfox" Peelle, Solatrus, Tensei, and Thomas Ferkol	12 June 2016
THE GRUBBLES	James Roach (attributed to The Grubbels, a fictional band)	14 September 2017
Hiveswap Act 1 OST	James Roach and Toby Fox	14 September 2017
Hiveswap Friendsim	James Roach (with minor contributions from Toby Fox)	15 December 2018
Beyond Canon	horizon, David Ellis (A Lunatic's Daydream), polysaw, Sean "Flare" Gorter, Xauric, Erik Scheele, Alex Votl, Marcus Carline, Waif, Twirlin' Curtis, Circlejourney, Sean William Calhoun (Do the Musicy Thing), Monobrow, Clark Powell, Mathias "FriendlyCoy" Ramalho, Tristan Scroggins, rj lake, and Emelia K.	13 April 2020
HIVESWAP: ACT 2 Original Soundtrack	James Roach, Toby Fox, and Clark Powell	26 November 2020
HOMESTUCK: The Animated Pilot	Alexander Arntzen	8 August 2026
PARADISE PLANET	LED_Faye, Adam Routt, ash taylor?!, Chaotune, SUMMONFISH, SpilledCereals, FLIN THE KID, stacylmao, autumnalEqvinox, Sapd3s, and pl0nt	25 October 2026
