= Gunshow (webcomic) =

2008 American webcomic

- Logo
- Author: KC Green
- Website: http://gunshowcomic.com/
- Launch date: 2008
- End date: 2014

Gunshow is a 2008 webcomic created by KC Green. The webcomic is gag-a-day, having little overarching story and covering a large variation of topics with strong tonal shifts. Gunshow is well known for spawning the "This is fine" internet meme in 2013. The webcomic concluded in 2014, as Green moved on to other creative work.

== Overview ==
Gunshow is written by KC Green, known for other webcomics such as Back, He Is A Good Boy, and Pinocchio. Green has also worked on the Adventure Time episode "The Thin Yellow Line" and published a graphic novel through Oni Press titled Graveyard Quest. Gunshow features recurring characters, but very little ongoing plot. Alex Borkowski of Heave Media stated that Gunshow defies categorization, as Green covers topics ranging from the nature of compromise to pushing one's limits to an endearing story about a crab falling in love with a lady. The webcomic has run for hundreds of pages and tends to use self-referential humor from time to time. Gunshow frequently features some longer storylines, its most ambitious piece being "Anime Club", a story about four anime fans who get kicked out of their meeting spot for watching a hentai film.

KC Green ended Gunshow in late 2014, as his other webcomics and his Patreon income allowed him to move on from it.

== "This is fine" ==
The first two panels of the strip

A 2013 Gunshow strip titled "On Fire" features an anthropomorphic dog (dubbed "Question Hound") drinking tea in a room that is burning down. Despite its own body catching fire and beginning to melt, the dog remains perfectly calm throughout the six-panel strip, saying lines such as "That's okay, things are going to be okay." The first two panels of the strip, featuring the dog simply sitting in the blazing room saying "this is fine", became a popular internet meme. The dog's demeanor, described as "somewhere between bemused acceptance and outright denial" by Slate Magazine's Jacob Brogan, proved popular with its full context removed. The sentence "this is fine" was described by The Verge's Chris Plante as a "shorthand for when a situation becomes so terrible our brains refuse to grapple with its severity".

The spread of the two panels was traced back by the Know Your Meme community to September 2014, when the image appeared without attribution on Reddit and Imgur with the caption "Basically how I'm handling life right now". The meme has been used on social media as a general comment on bad events or disasters, such as the Deepwater Horizon oil spill. It was used by Hollywood Reporter to criticize the 2026 Golden Globes for pretending all's well with the world. Green described the meme's popularity in 2016 as "a barometer of current trends", indicating that it was an intense year. Brogan stated that the meme is unique because it is infrequently modified from its original version and because its popularity was still climbing as of 2016.

Watch NASA’s Perseverance Rover Land on Mars!
- The plushie appeared in the show at the EDL Operation Lead's table.
- 1:18:48, a front view
- 1:56:36, a side view

In an interview, KC Green stated that during the period in which he created "On Fire" he was struggling with himself and getting his anti-depressant dosage right. As the image's popularity surged, Green started selling prints and shirts of the strip on his TopatoCo storefront. Green noted that "It's easier to sell the first two [panels] than the entire [comic] where the dog melts into nothingness." Purchase of Question Hound as a plushie received newfound attention on social media when one was seen at the Mars 2020 mission control for the landing of Perseverance.

In 2016 Green followed up the "On Fire" comic with a "This is Not Fine" comic on The Nib, in which the dog abruptly switches from denial of the fire to terror over it, putting it out in a panic while yelling at themselves for letting the fire go so far out of control, and makes mention of the recent killing of Harambe, a gorilla in a Cincinnati zoo.

In 2016, The New York Times called "This is fine" "the meme this year deserves". In 2023, the Atlantic called it "The Meme That Defined a Decade", and called it "a work of near-endless interpretability".

In June 2023, the "This is Fine" emote cosmetic was added to Epic Games' Fortnite: Battle Royale as part of the Chapter 4: Season 3 Battle Pass in collaboration with KC Green.

In September 2024, KC Green and Numskull Games announced that they were working on a video game based on "On Fire" titled This is Fine: Maximum Cope which is planned as a "classic, old-school, platformer game" where Question Hound battles monsters from inside his subconscious. KC Green and Numskull Games also announced that a Kickstarter campaign to help fund the game's development would start of September 26. A year and a half after the campaign reached its goal, the game was released in May of 2026.

In August 2026, Green compiled the viral comic strip along with brand-new cartoons featuring Question Hound in a collection titled This Is Fine: Life Lessons for a World on Fire.

=== Usage in politics ===
"i still feel like i dont need to get paid when businesses or the like use memes of my art on social media. thats just how it goes now.

but I still feel I have the right to show my distaste for when it's used by unsavory people in my eyes.

so, thus, in conclusion, the gop account can eat me."

— —KC Green

In July 2016, the United States Republican Party (or GOP, short for "Grand Old Party") used the "This is fine" meme in a Twitter message, in reference to the Democratic Party selecting Hillary Clinton as their presidential candidate during the 2016 Democratic National Convention. The usage of the meme suggested that Democratic voters were in denial about damage being done by selecting Clinton as candidate, though it may also be that the GOP was simply celebrating what they saw as a "Democratic meltdown". Usage of the meme by the GOP drew backlash from some Democratic voters, webcomic creators, and also from KC Green himself, who said "everyone is in their right to use this is fine [sic] on social media posts, but man o man I personally would like @GOP to delete their stupid post." Vox Media compared Green's experience with that of various musicians that had their works appropriated for political purposes, and The New York Observer used the event as an example of how the works of webcomic artists are frequently reposted without proper attribution.

Green had already anticipated the usage of his webcomic strip for political purposes. First Look Media's webcomic The Nib commissioned Green before the Democratic National Convention to draw a version of the "This is fine" meme featuring the GOP elephant mascot similarly sitting in a flaming room. The artwork was commissioned to be placed in the Philadelphia Art Gallery in Old City. Once the GOP posted the Twitter message, The Nib responded with "We actually paid the artist who made this. Here's what he came up with" and a hyperlink to the cartoon.

The Ukrainian authorities behind the @Ukraine Twitter account used an animated version of the "This is fine" meme to illustrate in a self-deprecating sardonic tone the fight against the 2017 Ukraine ransomware attacks. This invited comments that they used the meme wrongly, since it came to signify disastrous government inaction; but it attracted attention to the tweet and contributed to an increase in the number of followers.

In early‑January 2025, Fridays for Future Germany used the first frame, redrawn to flat colors, to publicize their upcoming nationwide rally scheduled for 14 February 2025. Their caption reads instead: "Cuz this is not fine!".

== Media ==
In January 2016, Jason DeMarco, vice president and creative director of Cartoon Network's Adult Swim block, announced that there would be an animated series based on Green's webcomic. The series, animated by Shmorky, was teased by an animated version of the "On Fire" strip voiced by Dana Snyder.
