= MS Paint Adventures =

Set of multimedia webcomics by Andrew Hussie

- Author: Andrew Hussie
- Website: mspaintadventures.com
- Current status/schedule: Online (Closed from 2018 to 2025, all works moved to homestuck.com)
- Launch date: 2007
- Genre(s): Action-adventure, Puzzle, Comedy-Drama, Science Fiction, Science Fantasy

MS Paint Adventures, abbreviated MSPAdventures or MSPA, was a website and collection of webcomics written and illustrated by Andrew Hussie. According to some estimates, in April 2016 MS Paint Adventures was the largest collection of comics on the Internet, containing over 10,000 pages among its five series.

The comics were written in serial works or "adventures" in a manner that parodied interactive fiction games. The characters' actions were originally driven by commands suggested by fans in the comics' official forum, but fan suggestions were eventually abandoned due to the size of the fanbase and the author's desire to tell a more coherent story. The comics tended to draw inspiration from video games, imitating and parodying genres such as RPGs and simulation games. They frequently reference other aspects of current internet culture. Despite its name, the site's comics have been created primarily in Adobe Photoshop, not Microsoft Paint, other than the first page of Jailbreak; Hussie decided after that page that telling a story using Paint was not feasible. Over time, the comics evolved from simple static images and captions to frequent animations set to original music, and occasionally to interactive games created in Flash and HTML5.

One adventure, Homestuck, has given rise to a large fan community as made evident by the increasing amount of fan art and cosplay at comic book conventions. The rapid rise in the popularity of Homestuck led to its recognition at the Toronto Comics Art Festival for two years running, and it brought, on average, over 600,000 unique views to the site daily. An adventure game spinoff of Homestuck titled Hiveswap was released September 14, 2017, and was produced with funds contributed by fans of the comic via Kickstarter. This project raised nearly $2.5 million, exceeding its goal of $700,000 in a little under two days, at that time being the 6th largest Kickstarter drive. A followup titled Homestuck: Beyond Canon was launched October 25, 2019.

MS Paint Adventures supported its author financially, formerly through the sale of merchandise on the online store TopatoCo as well through advertising, and the site's own store and record label, What Pumpkin. Music used in the comics is sold through Bandcamp. In 2014 a majority of merchandise began a slow migration to We Love Fine. In October 2017, VIZ Media announced acquisition of the publishing rights to Homestuck, and their plans to republish the graphic novel adaptations of Homestuck starting in April 2018.

Today, the MS Paint Adventures website redirects to homestuck.com; Homestuck and Problem Sleuth were gradually republished over several months, starting in September 2025. Prior adventures were added to the site in February 2026. Later works such as Homestuck: Beyond Canon are published on their own websites. MS Paint Adventures is still available online, albeit in a slightly buggy form, at its website. (Note: Which is mspaintadventures.com/newindex.php)

== Works ==
=== Early adventures ===
Jailbreak, the first adventure written by Andrew Hussie, was originally a forum game following an unnamed man as he attempts to escape from a prison cell, first launched on September 25, 2006. The first page of Jailbreak is the only panel of any MS Paint Adventures work actually created using Microsoft Paint; Hussie created the rest of Jailbreak and later webcomics using Photoshop. Jailbreak was written entirely as a forum adventure, and the first suggestion anyone posted was taken, however ridiculous, leading to a rambling and haphazard story line. Jailbreak was only drawn to a vague conclusion, and Hussie considers it unfinished, but wishes to leave it as is. This led to the creation of the MSPA site and the closed format of later adventures. In 2011, a short official ending was added to Jailbreak as a callback during a notably lengthy Homestuck hiatus.

The second adventure, Bard Quest, was an experiment in creating multiple, branching paths rather than a single linear storyline. In Bard Quest, Hussie provided choices as hyperlinks in a choose-your-own-adventure format. It was the first adventure to be hosted on its own website, but was ultimately left unfinished due to the difficulty Hussie faced in maintaining the complex web of branching storylines. Bard Quest was updated from June 12 to July 6, 2007, after which the site was left on hiatus.

=== Problem Sleuth ===
A parody of interactive fiction games and the film noir genre, Problem Sleuth began by presenting three detectives who are attempting to escape from their respective offices, though the story quickly turned into a pastiche of video games and science fiction. Problem Sleuth ran from March 10, 2008, to April 7, 2009. Unlike its predecessors, it received a proper ending, becoming the first complete adventure. It is the second-longest comic on the website so far, after Homestuck, with 1,674 pages.

=== Homestuck ===
Homestuck is the longest adventure hosted on MS Paint Adventures with over 8,000 pages and over 800,000 words. It ran from April 13, 2009, to April 13, 2016, and follows four teenagers as they play a reality-altering video game that brings about the end of the world. They must work with an alien species from another universe to create their own universe and essentially become its "owners". Homestuck's basic premise is inspired by games like The Sims, Spore and EarthBound. As in Problem Sleuth, the adventure is characterized by time travel, mystery, a complex fictional universe, and frequent references to pop culture and previous adventures. Changes from previous stories include an emphasis on contemporary society, such as online gaming and Internet culture, which contrasts with the historical settings of Bard Quest and Problem Sleuth. Additionally, this adventure introduced complex Flash animations and games, many making use of music and assets contributed by other artists. This represented a step up from previous adventures which exclusively used GIF images for animation. Ten major soundtrack albums have been released under the comic's own record label, What Pumpkin, in addition to fourteen side albums.

Homestuck has a large following and fandom. Homestuck has been compared to James Joyce's Ulysses in relation to the webcomic's complexity and how the task of finishing it is an example of effort justification. Homestuck's Adventure Game Kickstarter reached approximately $2,485,506 of a pledged $700,000 by the ending of the fund, and had 24,346 backers. The video game was expected to be released some time in early to mid 2015, but was delayed to January 2016 and then again to January 2017 until September 14, 2017, when Hiveswap was released. Hussie also stated that he will make an epilogue for Homestuck with Viz Media's help.

=== Sweet Bro and Hella Jeff ===
Sweet Bro and Hella Jeff is a spin-off of Homestuck. Within Homestuck, the comic Sweet Bro and Hella Jeff is written by the character Dave Strider, and several actual comics were produced by Hussie. It is presented in a different format than the other adventures, formatted more similarly to that of a traditional comic, having multiple panels per page.

=== Jester Quest ===
Jester Quest is a sequel to Bard Quest. It was announced in The Official Homestuck Discord Server on September 7th, 2025, being the first MS Paint Adventure to begin since Homestuck started in 2009. It follows an unnamed jester who reads Bard Quest and notices it has not updated in 18 years. Jester Quest ended on December 12, 2025.

=== Associated works ===
Other works have been sequels of MS Paint Adventure stories, but never hosted on that website. The Homestuck Epilogues is a partially canon continuation of Homestuck that ran from April 13 to April 20, 2019. This also is formatted differently from the other adventures, as there are no pictures. There are two different plotlines, a "more canon" one represented by meat, and a "less canonical" one, represented by candy. Homestuck: Beyond Canon is the second most recent work of Homestuck's franchise. It was launched on October 25, 2019, and continues the plot of Homestuck and its epilogues. The new webcomic was at first a collaboration between What Pumpkin and Snake Solution Studios LLP. It started with a new writing team led by Kate Mitchell and Andrew Hussie, who both later resigned from the writing team and the comic was put on hold indefinitely on December 25, 2020. On October 8, 2023, it was announced that production had been restarted by a new group of authors (many of whom have worked on the series in the past) under the name "Homestuck Independent Creative Union", spearheaded by Hiveswap composer James Roach and Hussie acting as Executive Producer. Updates are planned to be monthly and several have already been published.

== Conversion from Flash and closure of website ==
On April 2, 2018, the site was updated to automatically redirect to Homestuck.com, although the majority of content on the MS Paint Adventures site is still available on Homestuck.com. Pages operating through the Flash software were converted by workers at VIZ Media into HTML formats or video files. Andrew Hussie said that he had been thinking about the obsolescence of Flash and that it was never his intent for MSPA to last forever "or to concern myself with maintaining a labyrinthine, crudely-coded website for the rest of my life." However as of 2024, the site is online and does not redirect to Homestuck.com when visited directly. Due to the broken state of Homestuck.com, several community members have created an unofficial collection to view Homestuck in its original state, with a fork run by the Homestuck Independent Creative Union as of 2024. Homestuck.com began to republish the comic in September 2025, and would finish this process on January 8, 2026. As of June 2026, all previously released comics have been re-released on the site, such as Problem Sleuth and Sweet Bro and Hella Jeff.
