= TopatoCo =

Online retailer of webcomics

The Topato Corporation
- Company type: Private
- Industry: Online retail
- Founded: Oklahoma, US (2004)
- Founder: Jeffrey Rowland
- Headquarters: Easthampton, Massachusetts, US
- Area served: Worldwide
- Products: Clothing, stickers, books
- Website: topatoco.com

The Topato Corporation (styled as TopatoCo) is an online retailer for merchandise of webcomics and other media. It was established in 2004 by artist Jeffrey Rowland.

== History ==
After Jeffrey Rowland lost his job in 2004, he started TopatoCo to help sell shirts, stickers, and other merchandise linked to his webcomics. When the 2004 presidential election was won by George W. Bush, Rowland designed a satirical T-shirt and sold 1000 of them in one month.

Rowland later expanded the business to ship products ordered from friends' websites, who in 2007 moved their retailing to TopatoCo. While Rowland founded the company while living in Oklahoma, by June of 2005 he had moved to Easthampton, Massachusetts. In 2006, he began working with his partner Holly. The two were married in 2012, and still run the company together.

The company has been described as "perhaps the largest and most recognizable E-tailer of webcomic merchandise" by Caleb Goellner in ComicsAlliance and takes its name from the Topato Potato character in Rowland's Wigu Adventures. Rowland has described the company's business philosophy as being "give digital stuff away for free, sell real stuff".

In 2013, Holly started Make That Thing, a Kickstarter management and fulfillment service. Make That Thing originally served as a sister company to TopatoCo. Now Jeffrey and Holly manage and fulfill crowdfunding campaigns as part of TopatoCo's daily operations using the nickname TopatoGO.

== Clients ==
Some cartoonists involved from the early days of the company are Jonathan Rosenberg, Richard Stevens, John Allison and Meredith Gran. In a 2008 interview, Rowland stated that the "big guys" in terms of clients were Dinosaur Comics and Dr. McNinja. Other clients include Questionable Content, MS Paint Adventures, and Girl Genius. The company found in 2009 that it was growing too quickly, and turned down some potential clients.

=== List of creators ===
| Creator | Notable Title(s) | Additional Note(s) |
|---|---|---|
| Abby Howard, Black Tabby Games | Scarlet Hollow | |
| Abby Howard, Black Tabby Games | Slay the Princess | |
| Alex Schmidt | Secretly Incredibly Fascinating | |
| Andrew Hussie | MS Paint Adventures | |
| Anthony Clark | Beartato | |
| A. Senna Diaz | Dresden Codak | |
| Asymmetric Publications | Kingdom of Loathing | |
| Becky Dreistadt, Frank Gibson | Becky & Frank! | |
| Brandon Bird | | |
| Chris Hastings | The Adventures of Dr. McNinja | |
| Cohen Edenfield | Skulltenders | Features KC Green, Jess O’Brien, and Amber Carr |
| Dave Kellett | Sheldon | |
| David Malki | Wondermark | |
| Dorothy Gambrell | Cat and Girl | |
| Erin McKeown | | |
| Evan Dahm | | |
| Gene Ambaum | Library Comic | Illustrated by Willow Payne |
| Gene Ambaum | Unshelved | Illustrated by Bill Barnes |
| Ian McConville, Matthew Boyd | Three Panel Soul | |
| Ian Worthington | Worthikids | |
| Jeffrey Rowland | | Topatoco Founder |
| Jeph Jacques | Questionable Content | |
| Jessica Hayworth | | |
| Jess Fink | | |
| John Allison | | |
| John Hodgman | | |
| Jon Rosenberg | Scenes from a Multiverse | |
| Jon Rosenberg | Goats | |
| Jonathan Coulton | | |
| Joey Comeau | A Softer World | Illustrated by Emily Horne |
| Julia Wertz | | |
| Kate Beaton | Hark! A Vagrant | |
| Kate Leth | | Affiliated with Night Vale Presents |
| KC Green | Gunshow | |
| KoiBeat | | |
| Kory Bing | Skin Deep | |
| Lucy Knisley | | |
| Machine of Death | | Anthology edited by Ryan North, Matthew Bennardo, and David Malki |
| Mattie Lubchansky | | |
| MC Frontalot | | |
| Michael Kupperman | | |
| Neil Cicierega | | |
| New Leaf Literary | Cassandra Clare | |
| New Leaf Literary | Holly Black | |
| New Leaf Literary | Leigh Bardugo | |
| New Leaf Literary | Liz Climo | |
| Night Vale Presents | Alice Isn't Dead | |
| Night Vale Presents | The Orbiting Human Circus | Written by Julian Koster |
| Night Vale Presents | Welcome to Night Vale | |
| Night Vale Presents | Within the Wires | |
| Oh Joy Sex Toy! | | Originally created by Erika Moen |
| Olive Rae Brinker | Rae the Doe | |
| Olivia Jaimes | Nancy | Continuation of the 1938 Ernie Bushmiller comic of the same name |
| Phil & Kaja Foglio | Girl Genius | |
| Post Everything Productions | The Story Must Be Told | |
| Richard Stevens | Diesel Sweeties | |
| Rosemary Mosco | Bird and Moon | |
| Ryan North | Dinosaur Comics | |
| Sarah Jolley | The Property of Hate | |
| Sam Logan | Sam & Fuzzy | |
| Shen (Andrew Tsyaston) | Shen Comix | |
| Smallbu Animation | | Co-created by Lindsay and Alex Small-Butera |
| This Modern World | Tom Tomorrow | |
| Tom Siddell | Gunnerkrigg Court | |
| Trudy Cooper, Doug Bayne | Oglaf | |
| twistCMYK | | |
| Upright Citizens Brigade Theatre | Mission to Zyxx | |
| Ursula Vernon | Red Wombat | |
| Will Flanary | Dr. Glaucommflecken | |
