= List of Homestuck characters =

Character list for a multimedia webcomic

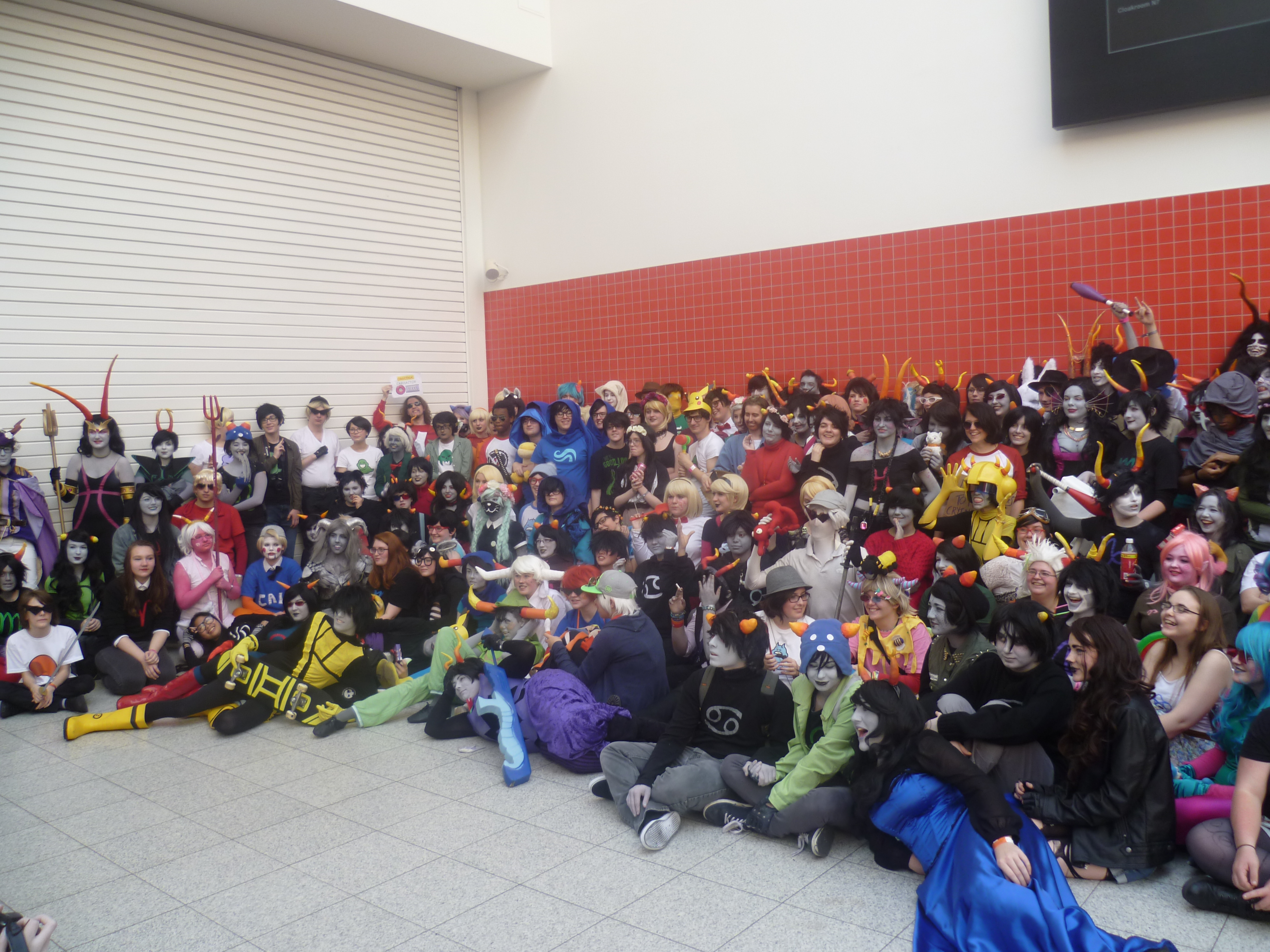
Homestuck cosplayers at MCM Comic Con October 2014 showing the wide range of Homestuck characters.

Homestuck is a webcomic written, illustrated, and animated by Andrew Hussie as part of MS Paint Adventures (MSPA). The webcomic centers on a group of teenagers who unwittingly bring about the end of the world through the installation of a beta copy of an upcoming computer game. Homestuck features a complex story and a large cast of characters, starring the four children John Egbert, Rose Lalonde, Dave Strider and Jade Harley. Andrew Hussie created an alien species, called trolls, that have a unique culture. Homestuck characters were particularly popular to cosplay at anime conventions during the early 2010s.

The first few acts of Homestuck center around four 13-year-old children. Early pages of Homestuck were experiments in "fan-sourced storytelling", where Hussie allowed readers of Homestuck to name its characters and make story suggestions. The main characters of Homestuck were all named by fans. The four main characters are presented as Internet friends who have technically never met one another but interact through an online chat application named PesterChum.

In the fifth "act" of Homestuck, Hussie introduced an alien species called "trolls", based on Internet trolls, who live on the planet of Alternia in another universe. While the first few acts of Homestuck focused on a more realistic theme of what it is like for a group of kids to be friends on the Internet, the trolls took on more explicit representations of facets of Internet culture. Homestuck aims to normalize and humanize internet cultures that are usually disfavored and rejected.

Trolls chat with unique typing quirks, inserting clues concerning the speaker's identity in their chat patterns. Troll culture features a complex system of romance, featuring four "quadrants", that was specifically designed to encourage shipping among Homestuck fans. With few exceptions, all trolls fall on the hemospectrum, a caste system dictated by blood color and its corresponding attributes, including lifespan, powers, personality, and rarity. Each troll also has an astrological sign that carries their blood color and reflects their personality.

== Human Kids ==
=== John Egbert ===
John Egbert is the main protagonist of Homestuck and the first character that is introduced. He is portrayed as a loyal "leader" of the group of kids, despite also being described as a "stereotypical mischief-making teen." Jokingly described by blogger Subdee as a "shoujo heroine", John's character is notably fond of bad films and has a seemingly irrational revulsion to the Betty Crocker brand. His weapon of choice is a hammer.

The first to enter the session, John spends much time communicating with the trolls, particularly Karkat, Terezi, and Vriska, who becomes his "patron troll." Under their guidance, he participates in the self-sustaining time loop that triggers his and his friend's births (through time travel and an in-universe science known as ecto-biology), achieves the god tier, and helps trigger the end game of his initial session by facilitating the delivery of "The Tumor". After he and Jade escape their initial session on a Prospitian Battleship, they travel for three years before arriving in the Alpha Kids' session. Once there, John mitigates the session's failure after he develops retcon powers, allowing him to literally retcon previous elements of the story, making key changes (most notably, preventing Vriska's death), eventually leading to the overall victory of the session, fighting and defeating Her Imperious Condescension in the final battle. After achieving this victory, the credits depict John slowly isolating himself from his friends as he gets older.

After the end of the original comic, a popular headcanon/fan theory arose that John would become a transgender woman under the name June. Hussie confirmed that there were plans for the character to be revealed as transgender when a fan of Homestuck was granted "a single wish" by finding a Toblerone hidden by Hussie. The silhouette of "June" has since appeared in the sequel, Homestuck: Beyond Canon.

=== Rose Lalonde ===
Rose Lalonde is portrayed as an "intellectual", both through her obsession with Lovecraftian literature and through her organizing and planning the group's movement during the story. She tends to speak and write in a formal, overwrought manner which contrasts to her messy room. Aside from her interest in the occult, the character also enjoys knitting and uses her knitting needles as her go-to weapons. In the first acts of Homestuck's story, Rose also updates a GameFAQs walkthrough of Sburb.

After some difficulties in entering the medium due to a local storm and poor internet collection, Rose begins to play the game and interact with trolls, much like her fellow players, developing a particularly close relationship with Kanaya Maryam. However, she quickly grows disillusioned with the game and ignores her questline in favor of causing destruction. This eventually causes her to enter a "Grimdark" mode, in which she fights and is killed by Bec Noir. After John revives her as her dream self, she joins Dave on his suicide mission to destroy the green sun (inadvertently creating it instead) and ascends to the god tier.

Rose, Dave, and the surviving trolls spend three years travelling to the Alpha kid's session, in which Rose begins a relationship with Kanaya and succumbs to alcoholism, rendering her largely useless when the kids arrive and contributing to the game's fail state. After John retcons the timeline, the new incarnation of Rose is no longer an alcoholic, having been deterred by Vriska, and is in a much better position to help her team, fighting and defeating Her Imperious Condescension in the final battle. The previous, pre-retcon version of Rose also gets prototyped into Roxy's kernelsprite and survives as Jasprosesprite^2. In the credits, Rose and Kanaya are shown getting married and managing the brooding caverns.

=== Dave Strider ===
Dave Strider is a boy "so cool he only appreciates things ironically". He copied this behavior from his older brother (also his biological father through ectobiology and his only guardian), who collects Smuppets (puppets) and katanas on what Dave assumes is an ironic level. Dave has been described as "smart-cynical", and is John's best friend. Surrounded by low-quality video games and junk food, he wears aviator sunglasses, obscuring his eyes entirely, and wields a katana during combat.

After some difficulties entering the medium due to his brother's interference, Dave quickly assumes his role as the Knight of Time, time travelling throughout the session in order to make sure key events take place and secure huge amounts of resources in order to give their 24-hour session better odds (although due to his time travelling, from Dave's perspective, the session takes 72 hours). This is done in coordination with Terezi, who equally assists and annoys Dave as his patron troll. Dave eventually assists Jade with her duties of breeding the Genesis frog, but is killed by Bec Noir. After Jade revives him, he sets out on a suicide mission with Rose to destroy the green sun (inadvertently creating it instead) and ascends to the god tier.

Rose, Dave, and the surviving trolls spend three years travelling to the Alpha kids' session, and Dave begins a relationship with Terezi, which he ends once she enters a kismesissitude with Gamzee. During this time, he begins to realize that the relationship he had with his brother was abusive, and both looks forward to and dreads meeting his brother's alternate self in the alpha session. Dave begins to grow disillusioned with the idea of being a hero, and when confronted by Grimbark Jade in the new session, refuses to time travel. During the confrontation with Aranea, he dies trying to protect Jade. After John retcons the timeline, his relationship with Terezi is prevented, and he instead enters a relationship with Karkat. He contributes to the session's victory, defeating Union Jack alongside Dirk and Terezi. After their victory, he is depicted in the credits taking the rest of the kids 5,000 years into Earth C's future, where he rules over the Troll Kingdom with Karkat, Terezi, and Jade.

Dave is also the fictional creator of Hussie's spin-off webcomic Sweet Bro and Hella Jeff, in-jokes of which are featured frequently in Homestuck. Sweet Bro and Hella Jeff are intentionally poorly made, featuring unsteady lines, liberal use of the spray paint tool, heavy JPEG artifacting, and the unpopular typeface Comic Sans.

=== Jade Harley ===
First shown on-screen during Homestuck's third act, Shaenon Garrity described Jade Harley as "the most recalcitrant" of the four kids. Jade Harley lives on a remote island together with her dog, Becquerel, who is the First Guardian of Earth (later merging with him). As she can see the future through her dreams, Jade was the one who encouraged the other three kids to play the fictional video game Sburb, and therefore set the plot in motion. She often uses a hunting rifle in battle.

Jade's introduction to the story involves a number of misdirections and pattern breaks relative to the other kids, including revelations that she has already been awake as her dream self, her dream self controls a robot body who acts in Jade's place during certain moments of the story, her grandfather is deceased and taxidermized despite Jade referring to him in the present tense, and her dog, Becquerel, is actually an all-powerful "first guardian" of Earth. Her entry to the medium involves prototyping Becquerel, transforming Jack Noir into Bec Noir and causing him to become a threat to the session. Her kernelsprite is later prototyped with her deceased dream self, resulting in Jadesprite, who Jade is disgusted by due to her weepy demeanor and inaction. Jade performs her duty breeding the Genesis Frog, but is murdered by the Courtyard Droll. Due to the loyalty he has acquired from Becquerel's prototyping, Bec Noir brings Jade to her quest bed, where she achieves the God Tier as the Witch of Space, merging with her dreamself and also gaining the powers of a first guardian. She uses these powers to shrink the four planets of the session, place herself and John on a Prospitian Battleship, and launch themselves to the new session.

During the three years of travel, Jade dates and breaks up with Davesprite. Upon her arrival, she meets Jake, who she had only communicated with via letters, but is quickly taken over by Her Imperious Condescension, transforming her into "Grimbark Jade," antagonizing her friends under mind control. In the altercation between Her Imperious Condescension and Aranea, she is killed by a falling tower. Dave attempts to revive her by bringing her to Jane, but Bec Noir and Peregrine Mendicant, prototyped with Becquerel, are protective over her body, and kill Dave. In the new retconned timeline, with the alternate versions of John and Davesprite killed (in order to be replaced by new versions), Jade was alone during her trip to the new session. Vriska, alive in the retcon, puts Jade to sleep before she can become a threat as her Grimbark self. In the final battle, Jade attempts to mediate between Bec Noir and Peregrine Mendicant. After their victory, she is depicted ruling over the Troll Kingdom with Karkat, Terezi, and Dave.

=== Jane Crocker ===
Jane Crocker is the heiress to the Betty Crocker fortune, and she is the symbolic leader of the four alpha kids. She wields a weapon similar to a pitchfork that vacillates between a pronged or spoon-like head depending on the Betty Crocker branding at the time. Her genetic son is, due to the "Paradox Clone" phenomenon, actually her grandfather and an alternate version of John Egbert, whose sister was Jake English's grandmother, Jade. Jane is particularly close to her fellow Alpha Kids, as well as the cherub Calliope.

After her introduction in Act 6, Jane is the first of her team to enter The Medium, and due to the fact that none of the Alpha Kids prototype their kernelsprites before entry, finds it in an unwinnable state. After helping her fellow players enter, the group spends half a year largely inactive, waiting for the Beta Kids to arrive. During this period of time, Dirk and Jake begin to date, much to Jane's frustration, as she pines for Jake. On her sixteenth birthday, natural circumstances as well as the lollipop juju cause Jane and her team to blow up and embarrass themselves in front of one another, causing the team to become fractured as they each achieve the god tier (Jane acquiring the title of Maid of Life).

Upon the arrival of the Beta Kids and trolls, Her Imperious Condescension takes control of Jade using her Crockercorp Tiara, turning her into Crockercorp Jane and against her friends and teammates. Jane attempts to pressure Jake, Karkat, and Kanaya into furthering the goals of Her Imperious Condescension, but is eventually killed in the altercation with Aranea. After John resets the timeline with his retcon abilities, this is averted, and Jane instead gets to finally meet Calliope. As the Maid of Life, she assists in the final battle, reviving her teammates as needed. After the battle is won, Jane rules the Human Kingdom with John, her father, and Nannasprite, an alternate version of herself.

=== Roxy Lalonde ===
One of the last two humans on a future post-apocalyptic Earth (along with Dirk Strider), Roxy Lalonde lives by herself and is known to frequently drink. Roxy is particularly close to her fellow Alpha Kids, as well as the cherub Calliope.

After her introduction in Act 6, Roxy attempts to enter The Medium, but is killed by the Red Miles mid-entry. Dirk's plan accounted for this, and he revives her, kicking off a series of events to ensure the full group's entry. Due to the game being in an unwinnable state, Roxy and her fellow players spend half a year largely inactive, although Roxy uses this time to overcome her alcoholism. On Jane's birthday, after a fight with Jane, she is eventually tracked down by the tricksters, who turn her into a trickster as well, causing her to return to her drinks. After the incident, she achieves the god tier along with the rest of her team, acquiring the title of Rogue of Void.

As the Beta Kids and trolls enter the session, Roxy is captured by Grimbark Jade, who attempts to force her to create a Matriorb (an object which can be used to revive the troll race, which Her Imperious Condescension wants to rule over her people again) via her Rogue of Void of powers. Roxy at first only succeeds in creating perfectly generic objects, but hones her power. During the skirmish with Aranea, Roxy attempts to save Rose, but Rose perishes from the battle shortly afterward. After John acquires his retcon powers, she joins him in entering the retconned timeline, causing the Roxy from that timeline to pre-emptively perish. In this new timeline, she connects with Jade, Calliope, and Rose. She fights in the final battle, landing the final blow on Her Imperious Condescension and avenging her mother (post-Scratch Rose). In the credits, she rules over the Carapacian Kingdom with Calliope, Rose, and Kanaya.

=== Dirk Strider ===
Dirk Strider is the brother to Dave Strider who shares a similar affinity for irony. At a young age, he made a digital copy of his brain that became his self-aware chat auto-responder. His older brother, another version of Dave, created a media empire surrounding Sweet Bro and Hella Jeff; the movie stars Donald Glover as "Geromy." Dirk considers the film series to switch between "surrealist slapstick and inexplicable boxoffice dynamite, to veiled, near-subliminal protest pieces" and frequently pranked audiences in manners such as selling films that did not exist.

Considering himself a "puppeteer" of sorts, Dirk does much to facilitate not only his friend's entries into The Medium, but also inserts himself into their lives in other ways, such as sending Jake a robotic version of himself to spar with, in an odd courtship ritual. This tendency to divide himself between multiple "splinters" (Robo-Dirk, Brain Ghost Dirk, his Auto-responder) is a reoccurring motif of his character. This entry into the medium culminates in a pre-planned scenario where Jake English must kiss him in order to revive him, kicking off a relationship between the two. By Jane's 16th birthday, Jake has grown weary of this relationship, and Dirk pre-emptively breaks up with Jake during the trickster arc (keeping his own personality despite becoming a trickster as well). Shortly after, Dirk achieves the God Tier, becoming the Prince of Heart.

Shortly after the Beta Kids and Trolls enter their session, Grimbark Jade teleports Dirk far away, causing him to miss out on the events of Aranea and Her Imperious Condescension's battle, in which most players die. In his grief, Dirk allows himself to become corrupted by the artifacts present in the story, and fades away. After John retcons the timeline, this fate is avoided, and Dirk instead spends time bonding with Dave, the two of them discussing Dirk's abusive alternate self, the nature of splinters, and sexuality. He contributes to the session's victory, defeating Union Jack alongside Dave and Terezi. After their victory, he is depicted in the credits ruling over the Consort Kingdom with Jake.

=== Jake English ===
Similar to Jade Harley, Jake English lives alone on an island. He is a fan of action movies and speaks in an antiquated fashion. English's surname comes from the villain Lord English, his grandmother having taken the surname to spite her abusive mother (Her Imperious Condescension), who was afraid of Lord English.

Jake is the first alpha kid to be referenced in the story, appearing as Jade's pen pal long before his introduction in Act 6. Also prior to his introduction, his dream self is assassinated, leaving him as the only Alpha Kid without one. As the other Alpha Kids enter The Medium, Jake joins them, escaping a volcanic eruption on his island. During this, he kisses Dirk to revive him (as part of a plan specifically engineered by Dirk), kicking off a relationship between the two of them. The relationship falls apart by the time of Jane's sixteenth birthday, with Jake actively avoiding Dirk, and Dirk breaks up with Jake as the Alpha Kids become tricksters. Shortly after this, all four Alpha Kids ascend to the god tier, with Jake's being the Page of Hope.

After the Beta Kids and trolls arrive in the session, both Jade and Jane are quickly mind controlled by Her Imperious Condescension, and Jane attempts to relegate Jake to being a trophy husband for her. During Aranea's attempt at overthrowing Her Imperious Condescension, she manipulates Jake, using her powers to make him a powerful source of energy, even more powerful than Jade when utilizing the Green Sun. However, he is killed alongside Jane in the skirmish. In the post-retcon timeline, this is avoided, and Jake instead participates in the final battle, battling Lord English's leprechauns and emerging victorious. After the team succeeds, he is depicted in the credits ruling over the Consort Kingdom with Dirk.

== Beta Trolls ==
=== Aradia Megido ===
A powerful psychic with an ability to speak with the dead, Aradia Megido is responsible for recovering the code for Sgrub, the troll version of Sburb. She is a rust-blood, the lowest ranking blood color on the hemospectrum with the shortest lifespan, but also the most likely to have psychic powers. One night, before entering Sgrub, an incident occurs involving Vriska Serket, Terezi Pyrope, Tavros Nitram and a violent cycle of revenge which kills her lusus (caretaker). Eventually it is revealed that this also killed Aradia, turning her into a ghost and causing her to lose interest in everything she enjoyed prior, including archaeology and focus instead on acquiring and playing Sgrub. At Vriska's suggestion, Equius Zahhak creates a robot body for Aradia.

During the trolls' session, Aradia uses her time travel powers to create a huge number of doomed counterparts, who sacrifice themselves in the trolls' session, and continue to appear in the Dream Bubbles. After the alpha timeline Aradia's robot body explodes, she is one of the only two trolls to reach god-tier (along with Vriska Serket). After ascension, she largely forgoes interacting with the main story, instead spending her time in the dream bubbles, stating, "i think i mostly want to see what happens when this whole place breaks apart". Her astrological sign is Aries.

=== Tavros Nitram ===
Tavros Nitram is a bronze-blood who deals with self-esteem issues. He has a "Lusus" (guardian beasts that protect young trolls), a winged bull named Tinkerbull inspired by the character Tinker Bell. He is shy and unassertive, and struggles with standing up for himself, especially to Vriska Serket. He is shown to have an interest in fairy tales and fantasy stories, notably Pupa Pan, the Alternian equivalent of Peter Pan, and also has the ability to commune with animals. He uses a wheelchair after an encounter with Vriska, who turned on him after her romantic interests went unaddressed, leaving him paralyzed.

After his team's session is completed, he gains robotic legs from Equius, but Vriska kills him shortly afterwards in a duel between the two of them on the meteor. His pre-retcon ghost self eventually leads an army against Lord English, while his post-retcon body is prototyped into Jane's sprite along with God Cat, creating Gcatavrosprite. His astrological sign is Taurus.

Tavros' ancestral figure, Rufioh (also known as Rogue of Breath), was inspired by the character Rufio from the 1991 film Hook. Dante Basco, who played Rufio in Hook, started reading Homestuck because his character made an appearance in it, and he later stated that Tavros is his favorite Homestuck character because of his relation to Rufio.

=== Sollux Captor ===
Sollux Captor is a computer programmer whose personality is associated with ideas of duality and bifurcation. Sollux is a gold-blood, a caste known for great psychic power. He is the one who programs Sgrub (the troll version of Sburb) from the code Aradia Megido found, and designates himself the leader of the Blue Team. Sollux has the ability to talk to the recently deceased, who inform him that Alternia will be annihilated. Sollux speaks with a severe lisp, and his typing quirk reflects this. His astrological sign is Gemini.

After the trolls' session, Sollux largely avoids interacting with the humans. On the meteor, he gets into a fight with Eridan, which leaves him knocked out and eventually blinded. Upon waking up, he uses his powers to move the meteor away from the expanding Green Sun, seemingly dying but eventually finding himself to be a "half-ghost" (and only half-blind). One of his bodies is eventually prototyped into Erisolsprite (along with Eridan), which causes his half-ghost self to become fully alive and fully blind again. This iteration of him goes on to travel with the party searching for Vriska's treasure and eventually fighting Lord English. A post-retcon version of Sollux also exists, seen in Tavros' ghost army. His lusus is a large, horned, two-headed giant known as The Bicyclops.

=== Karkat Vantas ===
Karkat Vantas is the leader of both the Red Team and the trolls' group, and his introduction in Act 5 mirrors that of John Egbert at the start of the webcomic. He is quick to anger, loud, and often rude, but cares about his friends. His blood color is candy-red, which is considered a mutant color outside the hemospectrum, which would mark him for execution if publicly known. This causes him to be self-conscious and to use a dull gray as his signature accent color so as not to reveal his true blood color. His astrological sign is Cancer. His lusus is a towering bipedal crustacean.

After leading his team to victory in his session and then witnessing Bec Noir take their victory from them, Karkat leads the charge trolling the kids, encouraging the rest of his team to do so. He eventually begins to help the kids, though, becoming Jade's "Patron Troll." After his teammates begin to murder each other, Karkat tries to calm the team down, eventually pacifying Gamzee as his moirail. During the trip between sessions, Karkat is enraged when Dave and Terezi begin to date and worries about his role as leader, and his new girl bonding with Meenah Peixes, the leader of the Alpha Trolls. After his arrival in the new session, Karkat is killed by Gamzee during the altercation between Aranea and Her Imperious Condescension. This is erased when John retcons the timeline, and in the new version of events, Karkat and Dave begin to date on the meteor. Despite Kanaya knocking him unconscious to protect him, Karkat participates in the final battle, assisting Jake in defeating the leprechauns. In the credits, he is seen ruling over the Troll Kingdom with Dave, Terezi, and Jade.

=== Nepeta Leijon ===
Nepeta Leijon is an olive-blood, considered the "middle class" of the hemospectrum. She lives in a cave with her lusus, and is known for role-playing and acting like a cat. She embodies an interest in both furries and shipping. She is Equius Zahhak's moirail. Her lusus is a feline creature with two mouths named "Pounce de León". Her astrological sign is Leo.

After the game's end, she tries to communicate positively with the humans, in opposition to some of her teammate's antagonism. After Gamzee's breakdown, he murders Nepeta. She is revived as Fefetasprite (with Feferi), but eventually "fefetasplodes" after being argued over by Arquiusprite and Erisolsprite. Nepeta joins Vriska's treasure hunting crew in the dream bubbles and goes on to fight Lord English as a part of Tavros' ghost army.

=== Kanaya Maryam ===
Kanaya Maryam is a jade-blood, a caste who spends their adult life in the brooding caverns, assisting the Mother Grubs in troll procreation. She has a great interest in fashion, and is thematically strongly influenced by the Virgin Mary, taking on a motherly role towards the other trolls, particularly Karkat Vantas. Her astrological sign is Virgo.

After the trolls' session, Kanaya is intrigued by the human Rose Lalonde, and follows Karkat's orders to troll her, although begins to form a legitimate attachment. She also creates a "science wand" for Eridan, which he uses against her when on his murderous rampage, seemingly killing her. She soon resurrects, however, as a "rainbow drinker", or vampire, and escapes with the other living trolls on the meteor, although with the intention of killing Gamzee. During the three years on the meteor, she and Rose begin to date, although Kanaya grows frustrated with Rose's alcoholism. Upon their arrival in the new session, she is drawn into the conflict between Aranea and Her Imperious Condescension. Upon seeing him attack Terezi and kill Karkat, she manages to kill Gamzee, but is annihilated by Her Imperious Condescension's psychic blast. After the timeline is retconned, Kanaya meets Roxy, who is able to produce a matriorb for her (an object required for troll procreation, and which Eridan destroyed the last of). She joins in on the final battle, defeating Her Imperious Condescension. In the credits, Kanaya and Rose are shown getting married and managing the brooding caverns.

=== Terezi Pyrope ===
Terezi Pyrope, the original leader of the Red Team before Karkat took over the position, is teal-blooded, and portrayed as an avid role-player and has a strong sense of justice. Prior to the story's start, has been blinded by her former friend Vriska Serket, after Terezi got involved in the incident between Vriska, Tavros, and Aradia, and inadvertently goaded Doc Scratch into blowing Vriska's arm off. To compensate, Terezi's lusus taught her how to "smell" and "taste" colors, giving her a limited form of vision. Her astrological sign is Libra.

After her team's session, Terezi begins to troll the humans, particularly John and Dave, the latter of whom she ends up as the "patron troll" of. On the meteor, after discovering Tavros' body, she immediately suspects Vriska of the crime, although also suspects that Vriska has committed various crimes she has not. Using her Seer of Mind powers, Terezi foresees Vriska accidentally drawing Bec Noir to the meteor and killing all trolls, and so she kills Vriska herself, an action she comes to regret. On the three-year journey to the Alpha Kid's session, Terezi dates both Dave (as a matesprit) and Gamzee (as a kismesis), the latter relationship abusive and ultimately causing the dissolution of the former. In the new session, Terezi is mortally wounded in the skirmish between Aranea and Her Imperious Condescension, and comes up with the plan for John to retcon the timeline before perishing. In the new timeline, John has prevented Terezi from killing Vriska, and the duo become moirails on the three-year journey, with Vriska preventing Terezi from dating Gamzee or making other questionable choices. Terezi joins Dave and Dirk in the final battle against Union Jack. After their victory, in the credits Terezi is depicted flying off into the black hole created by Alternate Calliope in search of Vriska.

Terezi was the first of three Homestuck characters to be introduced in Namco Bandai's dating simulator Namco High, of which Andrew Hussie was the creative director.

=== Vriska Serket ===
Vriska Serket is cerulean-blooded, a relatively high-ranking caste that also has access to mind control powers. Being raised by a giant spider, Vriska uses a spider-themed typing quirk and aspires to be a pirate. Her weapon is a set of eight legendary eight-sided dice, which, depending on what they roll, can cause either devastating or worthless attacks. Prior to the game's start, she was involved in a karmic cycle of revenge with Tavros, Aradia, and Terezi (her childhood friend), disabling, killing, and blinding them respectively, but losing an arm and one of her eyes in the process. Her astrological sign is Scorpio.

During her session, she is the only troll on her team to achieve the god tier, as the Thief of Light. Afterwards, she begins to troll the humans, taking particular interest in John, as his "patron troll", and Jade, who she manages to put to sleep at several pivotal moments using her mind control powers (less effective on humans than trolls). By doing so, she triggers the prototyping of Jade's dog Becquerel, leading to the creation of Bec Noir, the dangerous antagonist of much of Homestuck's story. She justifies this in stating that he was going to be created anyway, so she might as well involve herself, and then take him down herself as well. Upon learning of this, Tavros challenges her to a duel, in which she quickly kills him. Terezi, knowing with her Seer of Mind powers that Vriska fighting Bec Noir could cause him to slaughter all of the remaining trolls, kills her. In the dream bubbles, as a ghost, Vriska begins to find a sense of peace, but quickly inserts herself back into the action on a hunt for "The Ultimate Treasure," said to be able to take down Lord English. After finding it, John utilizes it, gaining his retcon powers. Vriska forms a relationship with Meenah, and begins to accept that her role in the story is done. As John retcons the timeline, he prevents Terezi from killing Vriska, which causes a new iteration of Vriska to live, who solves various problems on the meteor (including Rose's alcoholism and Terezi's poor relationship decisions). This post-retcon Vriska is disgusted by her pre-retcon iteration (now demoted to (Vriska)), and organizes the final battle against Lord English and his cohorts. In this final battle, Vriska unleashes the Ultimate Weapon on him, said to contain alternate versions of the human kids who can defeat him. Despite this, Vriska's fate after using the Ultimate Weapon is unknown, and Terezi spends the remainder of her appearances in the story setting off in search of Vriska in the black hole created by Alternate Calliope.

=== Equius Zahhak ===
Equius Zahhak is an indigo-blooded robotics expert with an unnatural amount of strength. He is Nepeta Leijon's moirail, a companion who is seen as a platonic soulmate and helps pacify their more aggressive tendencies. Equius's lusus is a muscular centaur characterized by udders and a distinctive mustache named "Aurthour". His astrological sign is Sagittarius.

During his team's session, Equius vacillates between strictly adhering to the hemospectrum, the trolls' caste system, and delighting in subverting it, behaving in a fetishistic manner when given an order by a troll whose blood is "lower" than his. He builds a robotic body for Aradia, filled with his own blood, and begins a turbulent relationship with her. After the game, he largely avoids interacting with the humans. After Gamzee snaps, Equius goes to confront him, but finds himself unable to raise a hand against a highblood, and is murdered. In the dream bubbles, Equius courts a large number of robotic, doomed Aradias. Later, he is prototyped into a sprite with Dirk's Auto-Responder, becoming Arquiusprite, who later becomes a component of Lord English.

=== Gamzee Makara ===
Gamzee Makara is a purple-blooded troll with strong ties to his religious faith, referred to as the "Cult of the Mirthful Messiahs," which he eventually brings about the creation and realization of through time travel. This religion is similar to that of the juggalo: he has an obsession with Faygo and believes firmly in miracles and the coming of the Dark Carnival. Until well into Act 5 Act 2, he is often high on Sopor Slime. His astrological sign is Capricorn. His lusus is a giant sea creature with a goat's upper half and a piscine tail, resembling the mythological sea goat which is the symbol of the Capricorn constellation.

During Homestuck's story, Gamzee is the last beta troll to have his class and aspect, the Bard of Rage, revealed. This revelation comes shortly after Dave describes how his entire religion is seemingly farcical, and he snaps, no longer consuming sopor slime and his personality changing from relaxed and kindhearted to murderous. He kills Equius and Nepeta, but is placated by Karkat, who serves as his moirail and calms him down. During the three-year trip, he largely hides in the vents, hunted by Kanaya. During this time, he forms an abusive kismesissitude with Terezi, and also schemes on behalf of Lord English with his dancestor, Kurloz. Using time travel devices, he serves a variety of roles in the story to further Lord English's agenda, ranging from a guide to Jane in her session to the caretaker of Calliope and Caliborn (assisting Caliborn within his session). Upon the troll and kid's arrival in the new session, he is mind controlled by Aranea, and when freed, brutally attacks Terezi. Karkat attempts to kill him in retaliation, but Gamzee throws Karkat in lava, before finally being killed by Kanaya. In the post-retcon timeline, Gamzee's relationship with Terezi is averted due to Vriska's intervention, and he is locked inside of a refrigerator in the new session, preventing him from having any influence over it.

=== Eridan Ampora ===
Eridan Ampora is shown as a violet-blooded, seadwelling aristocrat with a genocidal superiority complex. He claims he has a strong desire to kill all land-dwelling trolls and had commissioned a doomsday device from Vriska Serket to that effect, but he never acts on any of this. His astrological sign is Aquarius. His lusus is a flying horse-sized seahorse with a saddle.

Shortly before the trolls' session, he attempts to change his quadrants with Feferi from moirails to matesprits, but Feferi instead breaks up with him. After the session, he forms a one-sided rivalry with Rose, largely predicated on the existence or non-existence of magic, and Kanaya creates a "science wand" for him. He eventually decides that the trolls' best odds of survival are to join up with Bec Noir, which the other trolls disagree with, and in a fight he blinds and KOs Sollux, kills Feferi, destroys the matriorb, and kills Kanaya. Later, as he is about to enter a duel with Gamzee and Vriska, a recently resurrected Kanaya disarms the other two, and then slices Eridan in half with her chainsaw. Later, Eridan is prototyped into Jake's kernelsprite with one of Sollux's corpses, creating Erisolsprite, a sprite who despises their own existence but cannot bring themself to self-destruct.

=== Feferi Peixes ===
Feferi Peixes is a fuscia-blooded, making her heir apparent for Alternian rulership. This puts her at risk from Her Imperious Condescension, the Empress of Alternia, who would make an attempt on her life if it weren't for her lusus' protection. Her astrological sign is Pisces. Her lusus is named "Gl'bgolyb", is a colossal squid-like abomination that serves as the shared guardian of her, The Condesce, and other fuchsia-bood on Alternia.

Shortly before the trolls' session, Feferi dumps Eridan, her moirail, and begins to grow close to Sollux as the game progresses. After the session, she is killed by Eridan after he knocks out Sollux and proposes joining Bec Noir. Despite her death, Feferi manages to coordinate the existence of the dream bubbles with the horrorterrors due to her relationship with them through her lusus, Gl'bgolyb. She is later resurrected with Nepeta as Fefetasprite, Roxy's sprite, but "fefetasplodes" when caught up in an argument between Erisolsprite and Arquiusprite. Once more a ghost, Feferi joins Vriska's treasure hunt alongside her dancestor, Meenah Peixes.

== Cherubs ==
=== Calliope ===
Calliope is a cherub, an alien race in which two separate beings share one body. She and her brother Caliborn are initially portrayed to be trolls, but this is not the case; Calliope herself simply has a deep fascination with trolls, and as such she cosplays as a troll, representing the more creative side of the Homestuck fandom. Her astrological sign is Ophiuchus.

Calliope is in direct communication with the Alpha Kids, goading them along and providing them insight into Sburb and its purpose. She is able to do this as she lives on a far-future version of Earth, and has access to various books and resources about the game and the kid's exploits. While she initially believes that she will play Sburb with her brother, Caliborn commissions the murder of her dream self, causing him to pre-emptively "win" the battle for their body (rather than winning out in the natural biological process that all cherubs go through). After a time as a ghost, Calliope is eventually brought back by Roxy, and joins the players during their final fight and victory. In the credits, she rules over the Carapacian Kingdom with Calliope, Rose, and Kanaya.

An alternate version of Calliope also appears, one who triumphed over her brother but sacrificed herself in order to play a key role in Lord English's destruction. She manifests herself into a black hole which consumes The Green Sun.

=== Caliborn ===
Caliborn is a cherub, and the counterpart of Calliope. Whereas Calliope is portrayed as agreeable and friendly, Caliborn is shown to be angry and combative, purposely bullying and attacking anyone in his life, from his sister to the Alpha kids. His actions in the story represent a more aggressive side of the Homestuck fandom. He is fated to become Lord English, although the exact time and nature of this takes place outside of the main narrative of Homestuck. Like his sister, his astrological sign is Ophiuchus.

Caliborn spends much of his time communicating with the Alpha Kids, whom he make it very clear he hates, although takes a special interest in Jake English, who he hopes can grow into a rival for him one day. Prior to entering his game's session, he hires Dersite agents to assassinate his sister, causing him to prematurely take over their shared body, which is said to stunt his psychological growth. In his session, he finds it unlike any other Sburb session, and instead collects various "leprechauns" (later members of The Felt) who have various time-related powers, and uses them to destroy each planet in his session (in a way visually similar to a game of pool). Shortly after, he ascends to his god tier as the Lord of Time, and begins to write "Homosuck", an alternate telling of Homestuck which literally supplants it as the main narrative. John, using his retcon powers, appears as Caliborn is doing this and defeats him in battle. Caliborn makes one more creation, this one depicted using Vines, which show him battling alternate versions of the kids, before being sealed away by them with several other individuals in a vessel that will eventually lead to Lord English's creation. In the credits of Homestuck, he sends John a snapchat, calling him out to commence that very battle.

=== Lord English ===
Lord English is a cherub who is made of various "component characters" from Homestuck, but is most prominently a grown up, huge version of Caliborn. Other components include Gamzee Makara and Arquiusprite. He serves as the overarching villain of Homestuck's story.

First shown in Intermission I, his coming is foretold by Doc Scratch, who ends up being a vessel for his creation. Through direct intervention, his powers as the Lord of Time, and use of his disciples and vessels, Lord English affects many aspects of the story without being overtly seen, such as influencing the troll race into becoming a violent race. He also spends much of his time killing ghosts in the dream bubbles, hoping to find and destroy the alternate version of his sister, said to be the individual with enough power to defeat him once and for all. By using his destructive bursts, Vriska is able to chart a course through the Dream Bubbles, allowing her to find the weapon that will lead to his destruction. In the final battle of Homestuck, Vriska unleashes the weapon on him, causing a black hole to swallow The Green Sun (the source of much of his power). The exact fate of Lord English is left unseen as the protagonists escape into a world free from his influence.

== Parental figures (beta) ==
=== Dad Egbert ===
Dad Egbert is the main parental figure of John Egbert, although he is not John's alpha kid equivalent he is one of John's parental figure. Dad Egbert is a ordinary business man who appears to love baking and harlequins. Dad Egbert is killed off screen by Jack Noir in the pre-scratch universe, although he does end up becoming John Crocker, who is the adoptive father of Jane Crocker.

=== Nanna Egbert (Jane Egbert) ===
Jane Egbert is the grandma of John Egbert and the parental figure of John Egbert that turns into an alpha kid. She is dead by the time Homestuck's narrative begins, although early on, her ashes are fused with a harlequin and becomes kernalsprite.

=== Bro Strider (Dirk Strider) ===
Bro Strider is the older brother and legal guardian of Dave Strider. He is a parental figure to Dave, raising him in the pre-scratch universe. Bro is known for his obsession with puppets, particularly his puppet Sweet Bro, as well as his interest in swords, ironic merchandise, and breakdancing. He has a strict and often unusual approach to parenting, frequently teaching Dave through unconventional methods and combat training. Despite his eccentric and sometimes harsh behaviour, he plays an important role in Dave's upbringing. Bro is eventually killed by Dave during their confrontation in the Medium, although his influence continues to shape Dave throughout Homestuck.

=== Mom Lalonde (Roxy Lalonde) ===
Mom Lalonde is the main parental figure of Rose Lalonde. She is an eccentric, wealthy woman who enjoys cats, science, wizards and alcohol. She often displays affection towards Rose in exaggerated and overly elaborate ways, which Rose interprets as passive-aggressive behaviour. Despite their complicated relationship, Mom is an important figure in Rose's upbringing. She is eventually killed during the events surrounding Jack Noir.

=== Grandpa Harley (Jake Harley) ===
Grandpa Harley is the grandfather and parental figure of Jade Harley. He is an eccentric adventurer, explorer and businessman who raises Jade on his island. He is known for his extensive collection of unusual objects, weapons and scientific equipment. Grandpa is deceased before Homestuck's main narrative begins, and Jade frequently remembers him through his belongings, photographs and inventions.

== Post-Scratch Guardians (Alpha) ==
=== Dad Crocker (john crocker) ===
Dad Crocker is the adoptive father and parental figure of Jane Crocker in the post-scratch universe. He is the post-scratch counterpart of Dad Egbert and John Egbert's biological father figure. Like his pre-scratch counterpart, he is an ordinary businessman with a love for baking, formal clothing, and harlequins. He is a caring and supportive father to Jane, often showing his affection through baking and looking after her. He is also known for his resemblance to Dad Egbert, maintaining many of the same interests and mannerisms

=== Mom Lalonde (Rose Lalonde) ===
Mom Lalonde is the mother and parental figure of Roxy Lalonde in the post-Scratch universe. She is the post-Scratch counterpart of Rose Lalonde. Unlike her pre-Scratch counterpart, she is a famous author and an experienced practitioner of occult magic. She is also known for her involvement in the resistance against the Condesce. She eventually dies during the resistance.

=== Bro Strider (Dave Strider) ===
Bro Strider is the older brother and parental figure of Dirk Strider in the post-Scratch universe. He is the post-Scratch counterpart of Dave Strider. Alongside Rose Lalonde, he becomes involved in the resistance against the Condesce. He is known for his combat abilities, ironic personality and involvement in the rebellion. He is eventually killed during the resistance.

=== Grandma English (Jade English) ===
Grandma English is the grandmother and parental figure of Jake English. She is the post-Scratch counterpart of Jade Harley. She is an eccentric adventurer, inventor and businesswoman who founded Skaianet as a rival to Crockercorp. She raises Jake and passes down her adventurous personality and knowledge to him. She is eventually murdered by the Condesce when Jake is young.

=== Poppop Crocker (John Egbert) ===
Poppop Crocker is the grandfather and parental figure of Jane Crocker in the post-Scratch universe. He is the post-Scratch counterpart of John Egbert. He is an important part of Jane's family history, although he is not her primary parental figure. His relationship with Jane is connected to the unusual ectobiological family structure of the post-Scratch universe.

== Other Guardian Figures ==
=== Becquerel (Bec) ===
Becquerel is Jade Harley's pet dog and guardian. He is an extraordinarily powerful First Guardian who possesses abilities such as teleportation and manipulating space. He acts as Jade's companion and protector throughout her childhood. He eventually becomes part of Jade's sprite after entering the Kernelsprite.

=== Colonel Sassacre ===
Colonel Sassacre is an important historical figure connected to the Egbert and Harley families. He is the author of Colonel Sassacre's Daunting Text of Magical Frivolity and Practical Japery, a book associated with John's family. He also has a connection to the Harley family through his dog Halley.

=== Halley ===
Halley is Colonel Sassacre's dog and an important figure in the Harley family history. The name Harley is connected to Grandpa Harley's mispronunciation of Halley's name. Halley is also associated with the family's unusual history.

== Other characters ==
Andrew Hussie has inserted himself into Homestuck's story as a character, where he offers detailed summaries and ends up in "bizarre in-world encounters." After Ryan North asked why "MS Paint Adventures" doesn't follow the adventures of a "Ms. Paint", Hussie included a minor Carapacian character to Homestuck with that name.

Late in the webcomic, Hussie introduced Davepetasprite^2, a fusion of the characters Davesprite (an apparitional alternate timeline version of Dave Strider) and Nepeta Leijon. The character is notable for having a short-lived crisis regarding their gender identity, due to the differing genders of the sprite's two constituent characters. This trait led to most of the fandom defining the character as non-binary.

Occasionally, the webcomic has featured real-life celebrities as characters, such as the rap duo the Insane Clown Posse, restauranteur and television host Guy Fieri, and former President of the United States Barack Obama. Direct references to celebrities in the form of an important prop have also been included throughout the story, including allusions to both Nicolas Cage and Ben Stiller in the form of the stuffed bunny featured in the Cage movie Con Air, and Dave Strider's signature pair of aviator sunglasses, acclaimed to have been worn by Stiller in the movie Starsky & Hutch.

== Analysis ==
According to Lilian Min of The Atlantic, Homestuck's greatest strength is Andrew Hussie's "gift for character-building", and that the characters are unique and "strangely relatable". Elliott Dunstan of Monkeys Fighting Robots said, "the sheer number of characters and possible interactions can get overwhelming", and that each fan ends up with a favorite cast member. The characters of Homestuck are particularly popular among cosplayers, with cosplay events such as San Diegostuck being held for Homestuck cosplay specifically.

Mary Kinney of New York University wrote that Homestuck, which is heavily stylized as an adventure game, features an "implied character" as the player. This "nebulous" actor changes the Homestuck world. For example, on the first page of the webcomic, the player is prompted to enter the protagonist's name. After clicking to go to the following page, the reader's sense of control dissipates as they are not actually allowed to enter a name. The relationship between the player and the reader of the story fluctuates from page to page, and the player character may switch from avatar to avatar. In this way, the reader experiences Homestuck's narrative through the experiences of various characters.

In an interview with The Daily Dot, Homestuck guest artist Shelby Cragg praised Hussie's webcomic for its 50:50 gender ratio and large number of well-written female characters. Creatrix Tiara of Autostraddle noted that Hussie was highly successful with creating a diverse LGBT cast, by writing the characters in a "realistic, non-fetishistic manner." A large number of LGBT readers have claimed to have been strongly affected by the representation of diverse sexualities and gender identities in the webcomic.

=== Characters and death ===
Characters frequently die within the plot of Homestuck, which Andrew Hussie described as a necessity of a story with such a large cast. Though Hussie used death as "the line between relevance and irrelevance", characters generally remain relevant in some way in the story, as there exist various video game-style constructs that allow a character to be revived. Rebecca Peterson of The Martlet described how "characters are gleefully killed off, brought back, and killed again" in a manner that makes it difficult to follow which characters are still alive. Characters may even have multiple versions of themselves active in the story simultaneously, both dead and alive. In an interview with Big Shiny Robot, Hussie said the following on this topic:

[Homestuck] seems to combine all the meaningless deaths of a trial-and-error game journey with the way death is treated dramatically in other media, where unlike [the] oblivious Mario, the characters are aware and afraid of the many deaths they must experience before finally winning the game.

— Andrew Hussie

Death is presented as a "leveling up step" for the characters in Homestuck, it being the only way for characters to gain God Tier powers. According to Autostraddle, many characters reach a greater importance after their death, as they can contribute to the story as ghosts or helper sprites. Some readers of the webcomic see this implementation of death as a subversion of the "bury your gays" trope.
