= Chuck Sperry =

American artist (born 1962)

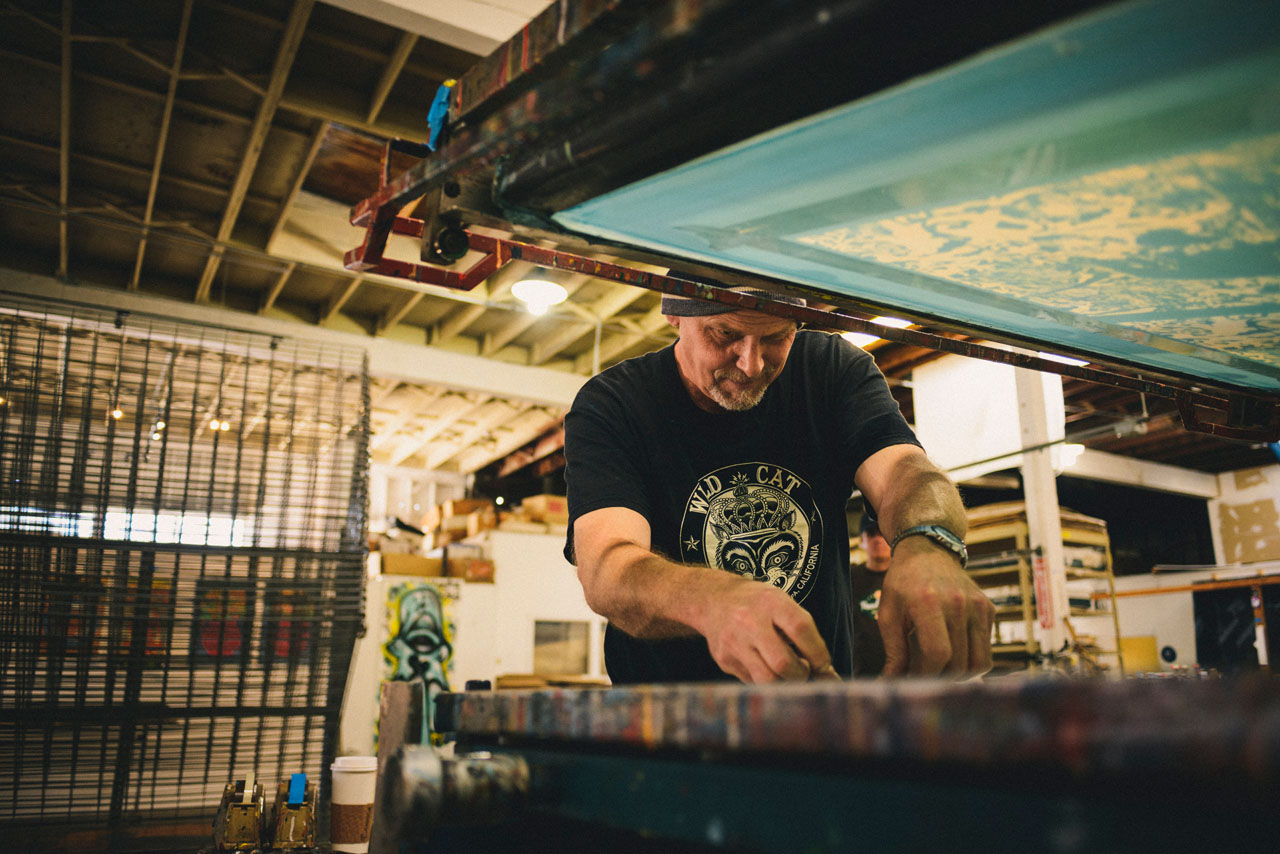
- Sperry printing in his studio, 2014
- Born: February 5, 1962 (age 63); Dayton, Ohio, U.S.

Chuck Sperry (born February 5, 1962) is an American artist best known for his screen prints on paper and oak panel, his limited-edition rock posters for bands such as Widespread Panic and Pearl Jam, and his political protest art. Since 1985, Sperry's iconography has ranged from astronauts walking on the surface of the Moon to portraits of performers as varied as Willie Nelson, Bob Dylan, and Chrissie Hynde. Beginning in 2010, many of Sperry's prints have featured images of female muses from Greek mythology.

== Early life ==
=== Family ===
Chuck Sperry was born on February 5, 1962, in Dayton, Ohio, to Sally and John Sperry, who apprenticed to sculptor Robert Koepnik, who had apprenticed to Carl Milles, who had apprenticed to Auguste Rodin. Sperry says that watching his father make art was a source of great inspiration to him, and gave him license to consider an art career for himself. Sperry's mother was a regional advertising executive. Sally Sperry's rise from layout artist to advertising executive also made an impression on Chuck, who says he was inspired by her professional advancement during the 1960s and ’70s in a male-dominated profession.

=== Education ===
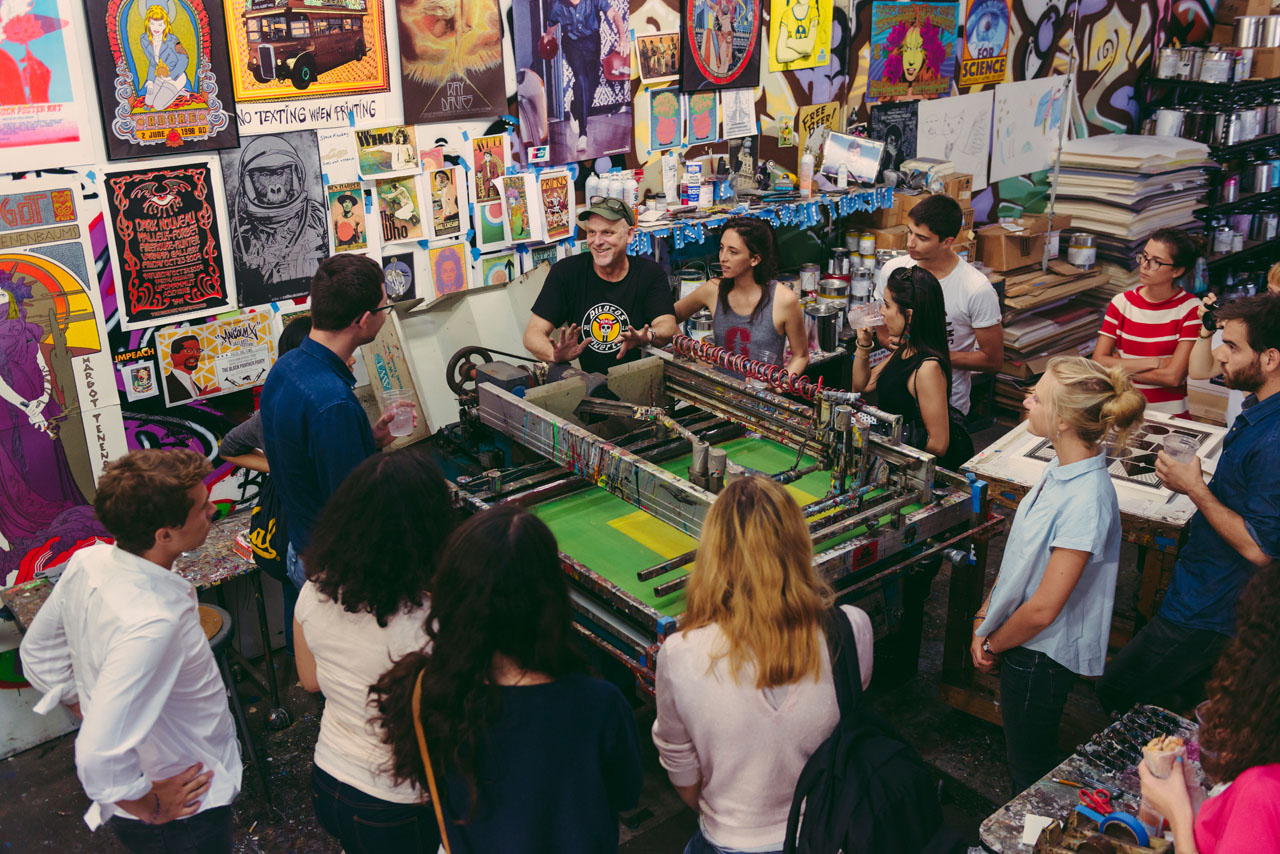
Chuck Sperry hosting a Schoolab Workshop with UC Berkeley & École Polytechnique Students. Oakland, CA. June, 2017

During this period, Sperry attended art classes at the Living Arts Center in Dayton and the Dayton Art Institute. In 1980, Sperry enrolled at the University of Missouri in Columbia, where he was a dual major in art and journalism. During his four years at MU, Sperry was an editorial cartoonist for the student newspaper, The Man Eater. Briefly, he also contributed illustrations to the Columbia Daily Tribune.

At MU, Sperry was inspired by the dean of art school, Frank Stack, whose work prefigured the underground comix of the late 1960s. In the late 1950s, Stack and cartoonist Gilbert Shelton had edited The Texas Ranger humor magazine at the University of Texas at Austin. Later, while in the Army Reserve, Stack created satirical comics in his spare time, subsequently putting the best of these strips together as The Adventures of Jesus, considered by many to be America's first underground comic.

Sperry was also influenced by Pulitzer Prize winning editorial cartoonist Mike Peters, who worked for the Dayton Daily News and was a friend of Sperry's parents. Thanks to that familial connection, Sperry sometimes visited Peters at his office in downtown Dayton, to show the editorial cartoonist portfolios of art, which Peters would critique.

== Career ==
After graduating from MU in 1984, Sperry stayed in Columbia for a year, during which he created his first punk-rock flyers and edited an underground newspaper called Java with musician Ann Wood.

In 1985, Sperry moved to the East Village in New York City, where he co-edited World War 3 Illustrated with Seth Tobocman and Peter Kuper. World War 3 Illustrated included work by Eric Drooker, James Romberger, Anton Van Dalen, David Wojnarowicz, Sue Coe, Art Spiegelman, and Michael Roman.

In 1989, Sperry moved to San Francisco, where he eventually art directed and co-edited Weekly Weird News & Filth with publisher Robert Collison; the newspaper had a circulation of 10,000 issues around the San Francisco Bay Area, and ran from 1991 to 1996. Sperry commissioned magazine covers and art from Robert Crumb, Spain Rodriguez, S. Clay Wilson, Paul Mavrides, Hal Robbins, Rigo23, Mats Stromberg, Gary Grimshaw, and many others.

In 1994, Sperry received his first commission from art director Arlene Owseichik to create a Fillmore Auditorium poster for Bill Graham Presents in San Francisco. (Since then, Sperry has designed scores of posters for the Fillmore, including F1000, the one-thousandth poster in the Fillmore series, a metallic poster for The Pretenders.)

Later in 1994, Sperry joined Ron Donovan and Orion Landau to found a rock-poster printing company called Psychic Sparkplug. Sperry, Donovan, and Landau were among the first modern rock-poster artists to use metallic gold and silver inks in the rock-poster genre.

The next year, 1995, Gary Grimshaw commissioned Psychic Sparkplug to print his poster for an exhibition in Cleveland called Visual Jams, which was organized by rock-poster artist Derek Hess and coincided with the opening of the Rock and Roll Hall of Fame (Sperry's work is in Hall of Fame's collection). Grimshaw invited Sperry, Donovan, and Landau to attend the event. Other rock-poster attendees included Mark Arminski, Coop, Gary Grimshaw, Derek Hess, Frank Kozik, Lindsey Kuhn, T.A.Z., Wes Wilson, Stanley Mouse, Lee Conklin, David Singer, and Randy Tuten.

That same year, Sperry, Grimshaw, and his wife, Laura, produced the first of two annual "Temporary Insanity" art shows at Off the Wall, a gallery on Haight Street in San Francisco, the first gallery exhibition in San Francisco of rock-poster art since the Joint Show at the Moore Gallery in 1967. Exhibiting artists included Victor Moscoso, Frank Kozik, Coop, Gary Grimshaw, John Seabury, Psychic Sparkplug, Mark Arminski, Lindsey Kuhn, Emek, Mats Stromberg, and Dennis Loren.

In 1996, Sperry worked with Clarion Alley Mural Project (CAMP) on two painted murals in collaboration with artists Barry McGee, Ruby Neri, Rigo 23, Aaron Noble, Isis Rodriguez, Susan Greene, John Fadeff, and many other artists representing San Francisco's Mission School Movement.

By 1997, Psychic Sparkplug had dissolved and reformed as the Firehouse Kustom Rockart Company, which was run by Chuck Sperry and Ron Donovan until 2012. Initially located in an actual San Francisco Firehouse (complete with fire pole) before relocating in Oakland, Firehouse designed and printed a series of posters for Virgin Megastore to promote record-release events and store openings. Many of these posters were die-cut to shape and promoted bands such as The Beatles, The Rolling Stones, Pearl Jam, Fleetwood Mac, The Beastie Boys, Smashing Pumpkins, U2, and Limp Bizkit, as well as performers such as Madonna. Over the course of 12 years, the Firehouse was also commissioned to design and print a series of posters for Eric Clapton and the musician's Crossroads Guitar Festival.

Beginning in 2008 and continuing until 2014, Sperry art directed nearly 200 posters for Goldenvoice Presents for its Warfield Theatre and Regency venues in San Francisco. During that period, Sperry designed and printed many of these posters himself, most notably an iconic poster for Bob Dylan and His Band, which performed at the Warfield on August 25, 2010.

By 2012, Sperry had severed his partnership with Ron Donovan and renamed the Firehouse, now in Oakland, Hangar 18. From that studio, Sperry has created designs for and printed hundreds of limited-edition posters for countless bands, including The Rolling Stones, The Beatles, The Who, Eric Clapton, Dave Matthews, U2, Madonna, Fleetwood Mac, Steve Miller, Smashing Pumpkins, The Beastie Boys, Pearl Jam, Soundgarden, The Black Keys, Nick Cave, PJ Harvey, Neko Case, Mickey Hart, Bob Weir, Mumford and Sons, Avett Brothers, Widespread Panic, Greensky Bluegrass, Twiddle, and Umphrey's McGee.

Hangar 18 is also where Sperry prints his fine-art pieces on various types of paper and wood panel, usually oak, for exhibitions at Spoke Art and Hashimoto Contemporary in San Francisco and New York, Art Basel Miami/Context Art Miami, L’Oeil Ouvert Galerie in Paris, and Next Door Gallery in Geneva.

In 2018, the Fort Wayne Museum of Art presented "All Access: Exploring Humanism in the Art of Chuck Sperry," a solo exhibition that included screen-printed figurative artworks, drawings, brush-and-ink originals, ephemeral progressive studies, and three large format hand-woven tapestries. In 2020, the Fort Wayne Museum of Art was scheduled to present "Color X Color: Selections from the Chuck Sperry Archive", which would feature more than 150 of Sperry's rock posters produced since the 1990s. A 752-page, 12-pound book titled Color x Color: The Sperry Poster Archive would be released during the exhibition. The book includes more than 800 color illustrations and includes essays by Charles Bock and Carlo McCormick. However, due to the COVID-19 pandemic, the book was released on its own and the show was postponed.

== Touring and exhibiting ==
Taking his work on the road has been a recurring part of Sperry's artistic practice since 1999. During the last two decades, Sperry has traveled the world with his art, showing in individual exhibitions at music venues, activist social centers, and galleries.

In the United States, Sperry has shown his art in San Francisco, New York, Los Angeles, Miami, Chicago, Seattle, Portland, and Detroit. Sperry has also toured Europe extensively, exhibiting and appearing with his work in Paris London, Rome, Geneva, Berlin, Athens, Buenos Aires, and Belgrade.

In 2012, Sperry made a tour of Argentina (Buenos Aires, Rosario, Mar del Plata) on a trip to attend the Trimarchi Design Conference, the biggest design conference in the Spanish-speaking world. At that event, he delivered a two-hour-plus presentation of his life and art to a stadium audience of 5,000. He also exhibited in galleries in Buenos Aires, and gave a lecture at the University of Buenos Aires FADU.

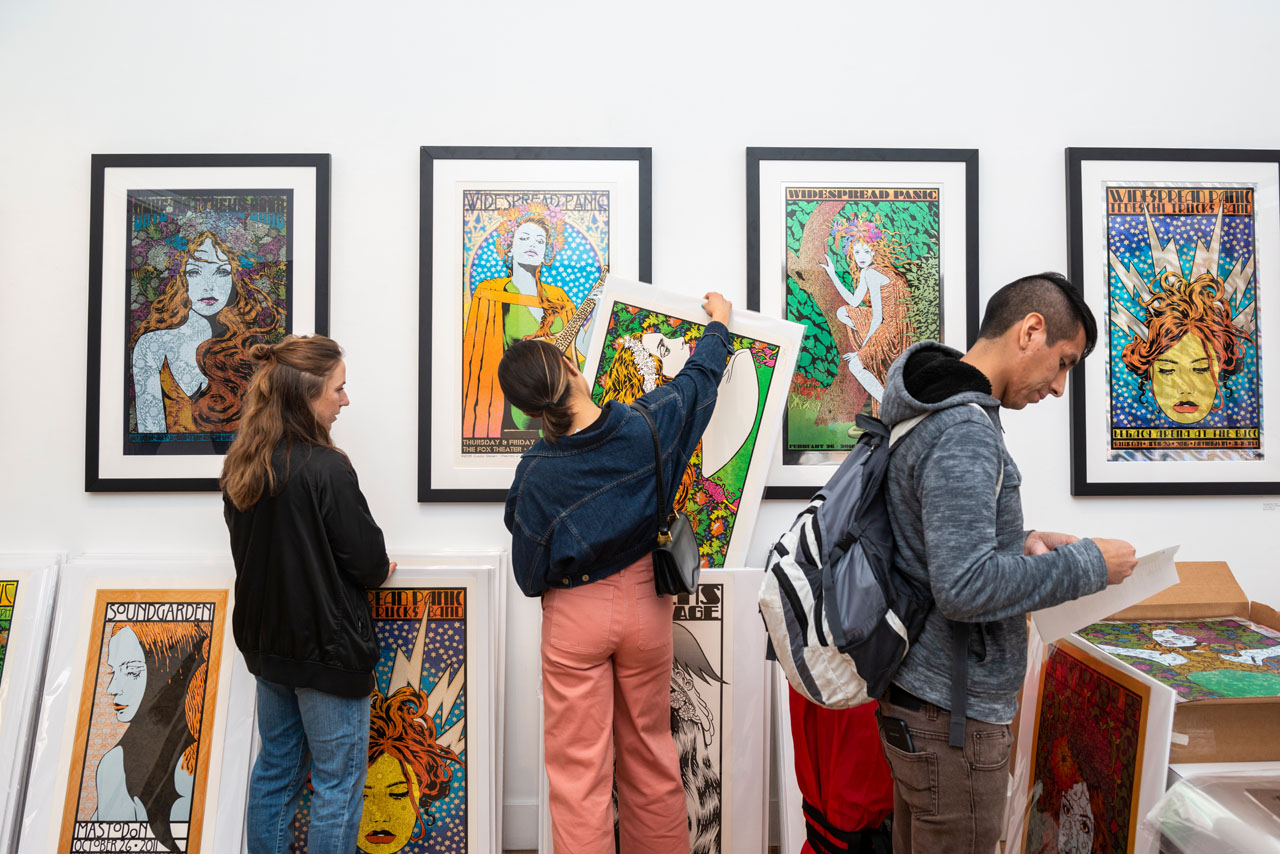
Collectors peruse limited edition prints made available for sale at Chuck Sperry's opening reception of "Heaven of Many a Tangled Hue" at Spoke Art Gallery, San Francisco, CA. April, 2018.

In 2013, Sperry created an art installation in a seaside chapel on a promontory square visible around the Golfo de Poeti in the village of Tellaro, Italy. He transformed the church into a temple of the muses, projected onto the face of the church a psychedelic liquid light show commissioned for the occasion of Grateful Dead light show maestro Bill Ham, and played a specially commissioned musical accompaniment by The Young Gods singer and composer, Franz Treichler.

In 2014, Sperry's poster art was exhibited as a part of La Fête du Graphisme sponsored by the French Ministry of Culture and Communication and the Paris City Council. For that event, an exhibition titled "Gig Posters: 150 Affiches Underground Américaines Contemporaines" was displayed at Les Docks Cité de la Mode et du Design in Paris.

In 2022, a retrospective called "Color X Color," which featured more than 150 examples of Sperry's work of the past 25 years, opened at the Fort Wayne Museum of Art in Indiana. The show was curated by Josef Zimmerman and was accompanied by an essay by Carlo McCormick.

== Other media ==
In 2011, the San Francisco Museum of Modern Art invited Sperry, Donovan, and Chris Shaw to create original painted artworks for the Window Gallery, a space that adorned a wall of the museum at that time. Sperry painted an 11’ x 9’ acrylic painting titled "Saint Everyone," which incorporated screen-printed elements.

In 2016 and 2018, Sperry worked with musician, songwriter, and performer Nick Cave, who offered Sperry lyric choices from his oeuvre to be illustrated by Sperry as a diptych of skateboards released by Fast Times Skateboarding of Melbourne, Australia.

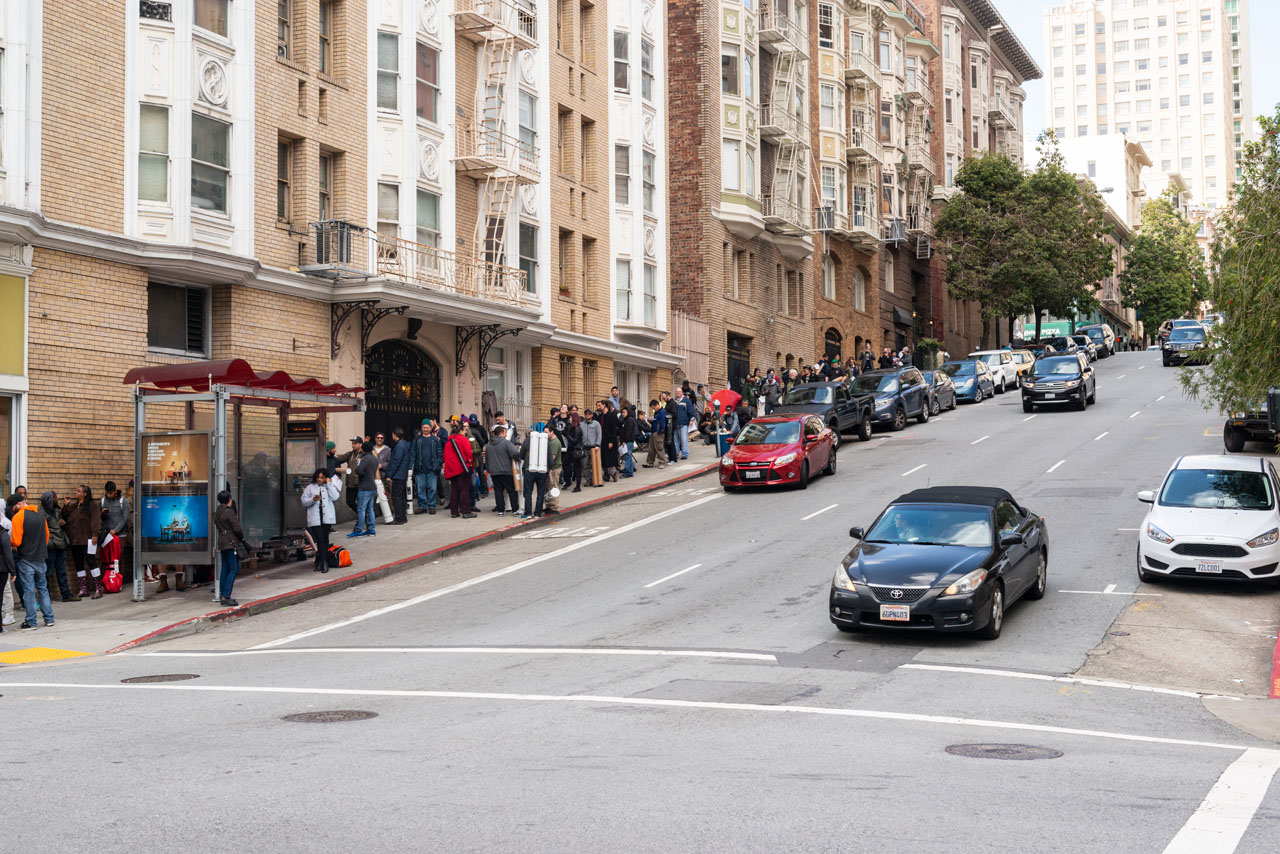
Collectors and fans line up around the block for Chuck Sperry's opening reception of "Heaven of Many a Tangled Hue" at Spoke Art Gallery, San Francisco, California. April, 2018.

In 2018, Sperry's first museum solo exhibition, "All Access, Exploring Humanism in the Art of Chuck Sperry", at the Fort Wayne Museum of Art included three large-scale tapestry art pieces created by Taller Mexicano des Gobelinos of Guadalajara, Mexico (the studio has executed commissioned work from artists Francesco Clemente, Sandro Chia, John Currin, George Condo, Damian Ortega, and Karen Kilimnik).

Over the years, Sperry has created book covers for HarperCollins, Random House, and Harvard University Press. These include cover designs for Redemption Song: The Definitive Biography of Joe Strummer, by Chris Salewicz, 2006; Beautiful Children, by Charles Bock, 2009; and the 20th Anniversary edition of Lipstick Traces, The Secret History of the 20th Century, by Greil Marcus, 2009.

== Political activism ==
Sperry was the Dean of Art for the Free University of San Francisco from 2011 to 2015. The school was conceived by writer Alan Kaufman and its teachers have included San Francisco mayoral candidate and artist Matt Gonzalez, poet Diane Di Prima, and poet laureate Jack Hirschman. Sperry created a program of street art, and invited graffiti artist Blek le Rat, illustrator and performer Eric Drooker, punk collage artist Winston Smith, street artist and skate activist Jon Paul Bail, and rock poster artist Chris Shaw to be guest lecturers.

In 2011, Sperry created a poster titled "This Is Our City and We Can Shut It Down" for Occupy Oakland. One thousand posters were printed, most of which were distributed to protestors on November 2, when the action closed the Port of Oakland. In 2012, Sperry's poster was included in the "Occupy Bay Area" exhibition at the Yerba Buena Center for the Arts. The poster was also included in an exhibition at the San Francisco Museum of Modern Art called "Get with the Action: Political Posters from the 1960s to Now," which ran from the fall of 2017 to the spring of 2018. Other artists included in this exhibition were Keith Haring, Shepard Fairey, Robbie Conal, Corita Kent, and Wes Wilson.

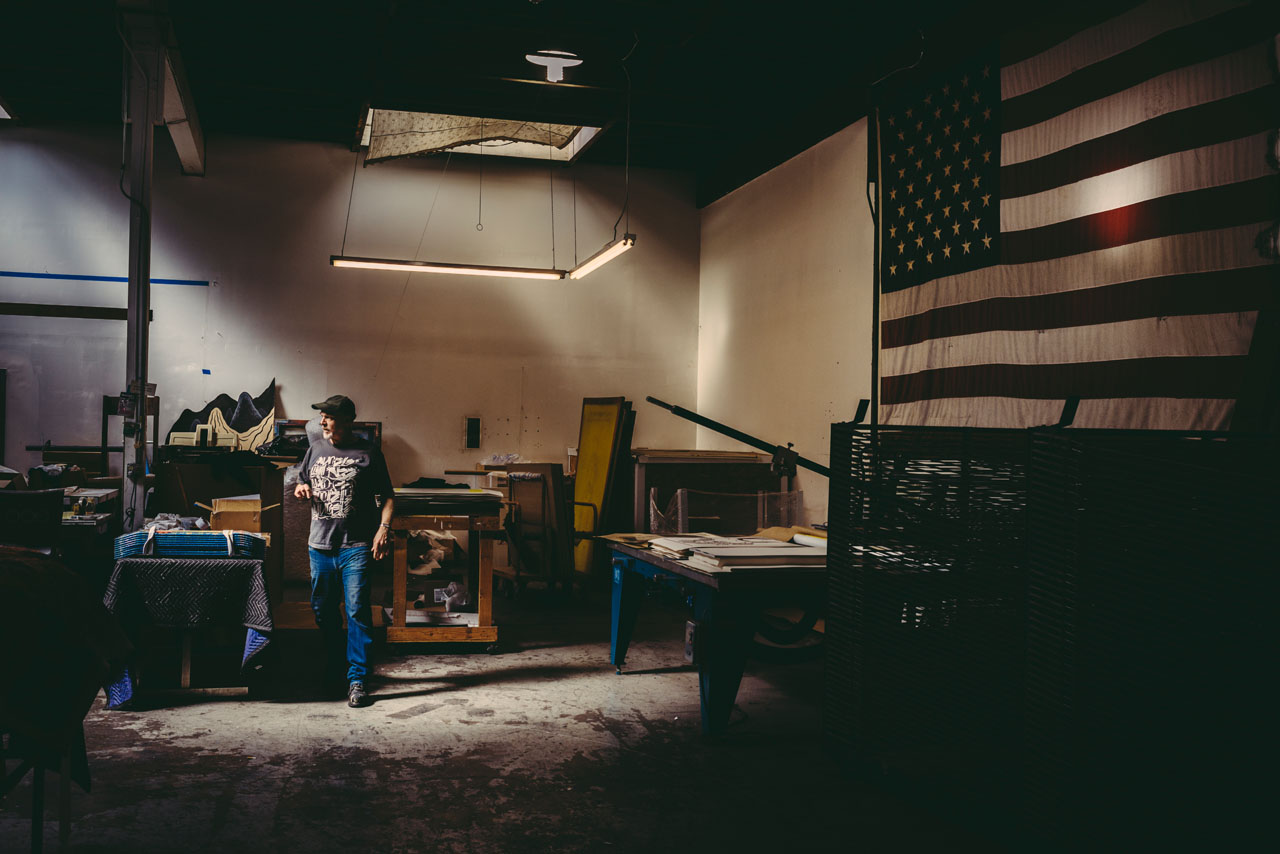
Chuck Sperry in his Oakland studio. Oakland, CA. March, 2018

Since 2014, Sperry has donated several print editions to an environmental action group called PangeaSeed. Sales of prints in each edition raised funds for education and the mitigation of climate change upon the world's ocean environment.

In March 2017, Sperry designed an official "March for Science" poster, collaborating with Albert Lin, a National Geographic Explorer and the Chief Science Officer for Planet3. All proceeds from the sale of Sperry's poster went to Planet3, while many others were distributed for free to schools nationwide to inspire the next generation of scientists and engineers. A free download was also available.

Other Sperry posters created to have a socio-political impact include the offset posters he designed in 2017, 2018, and 2019 for Women's March events in California, Washington, D.C., and elsewhere. Many of these posters were distributed by The Outrage, the official merchandise outlet for the Women's March. Sales of the posters via The Outrage raised funds for Planned Parenthood. Sperry's 2017 Women's March poster, "Resist Sexism, Racism, Xenophobia, Homophobia, Ignorance, Corruption and Hate," is in the permanent collection of the United States Library of Congress.

Sperry's Conscious Alliance poster for a series of String Cheese Incident concerts in 2017 at Red Rocks, Colorado, raised money and generated food donations, which were later distributed to the Pine Ridge Reservation in South Dakota to give relief to the Oglala Sioux people.

== Books ==
=== Monographs ===
- Eyesore: Recent Litter by The Firehouse Kustom Rockart Company
- High Volume: The Art of Chuck Sperry
- Helikon, The Muses of Chuck Sperry
- Chthoneon, The Art of Chuck Sperry
- Color x Color: The Sperry Poster Archive

=== Other books ===
- World War 3 Illustrated: 1980-1988
- Art of Modern Rock: The Poster Explosion
- Tiki Art Now! A Volcanic Eruption of Art
- Street Art San Francisco: Mission Muralismo
- Moonalice Legend (Posters and Words, Volume 1)
- The Art of British Rock: 50 Years of Rock Posters, Flyers and Handbills
- Gig Posters Volume 2: Rock Show Art of the 21st Century
- Poster Children: The Art of Widespread Panic, 1986-2013
- The Outlaw Bible of American Art
- The Wes Anderson Collection: Bad Dads: Art Inspired by the Films of Wes Anderson
- Posters for Change: Tear, Paste, Protest: 50 Removable Posters
