= Marley Davidson =

- Cover of Marley Davidson Issue Number 1 (1995). Art by Sandy Jimenez.

Publication information
- Publisher: Vampyrotechnic
- First appearance: Marley Davidson #1 (June 1995; Vampyrotechnic)
- Created by: Sandy Jimenez

In-story information
- Team affiliations: Vatican
- Notable aliases: The Mad Priest, the Bronx Exorcist
- Abilities: Expert knowledge of the occult, master of various forms of weaponry both arcane and modern.

Marley Davidson (sometimes referred to as "Marley Davidson: Bronx Exorcist") is a fictional comic book character created by writer and comic book artist Sandy Jimenez. It made its first appearance on June 15, 1995 in the self-titled independent comic book Marley Davidson, which chronicled the exploits of a Jamaican ex-priest, operating as an exorcist and monster hunter in New York City.

Typical Marley Davidson stories involve classic renditions of undead monsters such as vampires and werewolves as the chief villains and often as agents in conspiratorial plots to undermine and prey upon the poor and the underclass.

Marley Davidson last appeared in the fourth issue of his titular comic book in 1999. A series reboot was advertised in issue #40 of World War 3 Illustrated, to resume the series in late 2010.

== Creation and development ==
According to end notes by the author on the inside back cover of the first issue, Marley Davidson is a spin off of Vladek, Vampire Detective. Though the latter was never published, Marley Davidson was launched by Vampyrotechnic Studios in 1995 out of Wallabout street in Bedford-Stuyvesant, Brooklyn.

== Premise ==
Marley Davidson chronicles the adventures of an exorcist and his team of monster hunters, beginning in a conjectured 1970s New York City where the supernatural is as big a threat to human life as violent crime. The earliest stories in issues 1 and 2 illustrate a hard-scrabble existence, with the protagonists in need of money and support for their war against the undead. Marley Davidson and his team appear to function as mercenaries seeking paying clients, in seeming opposition to the principles and ethics of their mentors, a Rabbi and a Muslim cleric.

Like Sandy Jimenez’s other long-running series, Shit House Poet, Marley Davidson moves in and out of time from story to story. Issues begin with a particular year stamped on the first page as opposed to an actual title, with subsequent issues taking place years later without editorial segue or explanation. While foremost an action-adventure series, the stories’ setting in the South Bronx introduces realities and social issues more common in crime stories.

== Visual style ==
Marley Davidson, an independent comic book, was executed with intentionally unsophisticated production means. It has thus far employed artwork that is rendered with only “ball point pens” and without the aid of computer scanning or computer image editing. It has been noted for its “cut out” style achieved by use of unique hand-drawn Xeroxed patterns trimmed to fit in as backdrop elements in the place of screentone or Zip-A-Tone to create different textures.

== In other media ==
After the production of an animated short in 2006, a full-length animated feature was announced as being in pre-production in February 2007.
