= Eric Drooker =

American painter and graphic novelist

- Born: New York City, US
- Areas: Painter; Graphic Novelist; New Yorker cover artist Illustrator; Poster Artist
- Notable works: FLOOD! A Novel in Pictures; BLOOD SONG: A Silent Ballad; NAKED CITY: A Graphic Novel; HOWL: A Graphic Novel; Illuminated Poems; Street Posters & Ballads; Slingshot: 32 Postcards
- Awards: American Book Award (1993); Firecracker Award (1999); Inkpot Award (2011)

Eric Drooker is an American painter, graphic novelist, and frequent cover artist for The New Yorker. He conceived and designed the animation for the film Howl (2010).

== Biography ==
Drooker grew up in Manhattan's Stuyvesant Town, adjacent to the Lower East Side, which was then a working-class immigrant neighborhood with a tradition of left-wing political activism. He attended the Downtown Community School in Manhattan's East Village. Drooker developed an early interest in graphic arts and cartoons, particularly the woodcut novels of Frans Masereel and Lynd Ward and the underground comics of Robert Crumb.

After studying sculpture at Cooper Union, Drooker turned to poster art, creating flyers on local political issues while working as a tenant organizer. His images, done in a striking black-and-white style reminiscent of Masereel and other 1930s expressionist illustrators, were widely copied and reused by others—sometimes for unrelated purposes such as advertising concerts—and were popular enough that he could make a small income selling artwork on the street. During the 1980s, Drooker was further radicalized by his experiences with the police, due to their actions against squatters in the rapidly gentrifying Tompkins Square Park area and their increasing intolerance of unlicensed street artists and musicians.

His first published work appeared in leftist magazines such as The Nation, The Progressive, and various underground publications such as Screw. His work would later be seen in such mainstream publications as The New York Times, Newsweek, and The Wall Street Journal; and his paintings would appear on dozens of covers of The New Yorker. When World War 3 Illustrated was founded by Seth Tobocman and Peter Kuper, who shared Drooker's political beliefs and graphic approach, Drooker became one of the magazine's co-editors and frequent contributors. Eventually he began to sell illustrations to more mainstream publications.

He became more widely known as a cartoonist when his short story "L" appeared in Heavy Metal. "L", along with two other stories, made up his first graphic novel, Flood! A Novel in Pictures (1992); a wordless, dream-like narrative of powerless citizens' struggles with authority in a rapidly deteriorating New York City. Flood won an American Book Award. Portions of his Flood! artwork were used for album covers for the bands Faith No More and Rage Against the Machine. In 2006, the Library of Congress acquired the original art for Flood! A Novel in Pictures, including preliminary drawings, sketches, and cover paintings. The complete Flood! Archive is housed in the Prints & Photographs Division of the Library of Congress, which is open to the public.

In the 1990s, Drooker broadened his scope from graphic arts to painting, creating several covers for The New Yorker and a book of illustrations of Allen Ginsberg's poetry, Illuminated Poems. His third book, Street Posters & Ballads, is a compilation of graphics, poems and songs about the Lower East Side. The book won the 1999 Firecracker Alternative Book Award for Outstanding Graphic Novel.

He designed the animation for the 2010 film, Howl, a movie based on the epic poem by Allen Ginsberg, who collaborated with Drooker on the book Illuminated Poems. His best-selling book, Howl: A Graphic Novel, visualizes the poem with animation art Drooker designed for the film.

== Cultural references ==
His painting "Native New York" inspired Lawrence Ferlinghetti's "Poem #7" from his book A Far Rockaway of the Heart.

== Bibliography ==
- Flood! A Novel in Pictures. (1992 by Four Walls Eight Windows, reprinted 2002 by Dark Horse Comics). ISBN 1-56971-821-0
- Illuminated Poems (with Allen Ginsberg). (1992) Four Walls Eight Windows. ISBN 1-56858-070-3
- Street Posters and Ballads: A Selection of Songs, Poems, and Graphics. (1998) Seven Stories Press. ISBN 1-888363-77-0
- Blood Song: A Silent Ballad. (2002) Dark Horse Books (Originally published by Harcourt Inc.). ISBN 0-15-600884-X
- Slingshot: 32 Postcards (2008) PM Press ISBN 978-1-60486-016-0
- Howl: A Graphic Novel (with Allen Ginsberg) (2010) Harper Perennial ISBN 978-0-06-201517-4
- Naked City: A Graphic Novel (2024) Dark Horse Books ISBN 978-1-5067-4350-9
