= Monica McKelvey Johnson =

American artist and activist

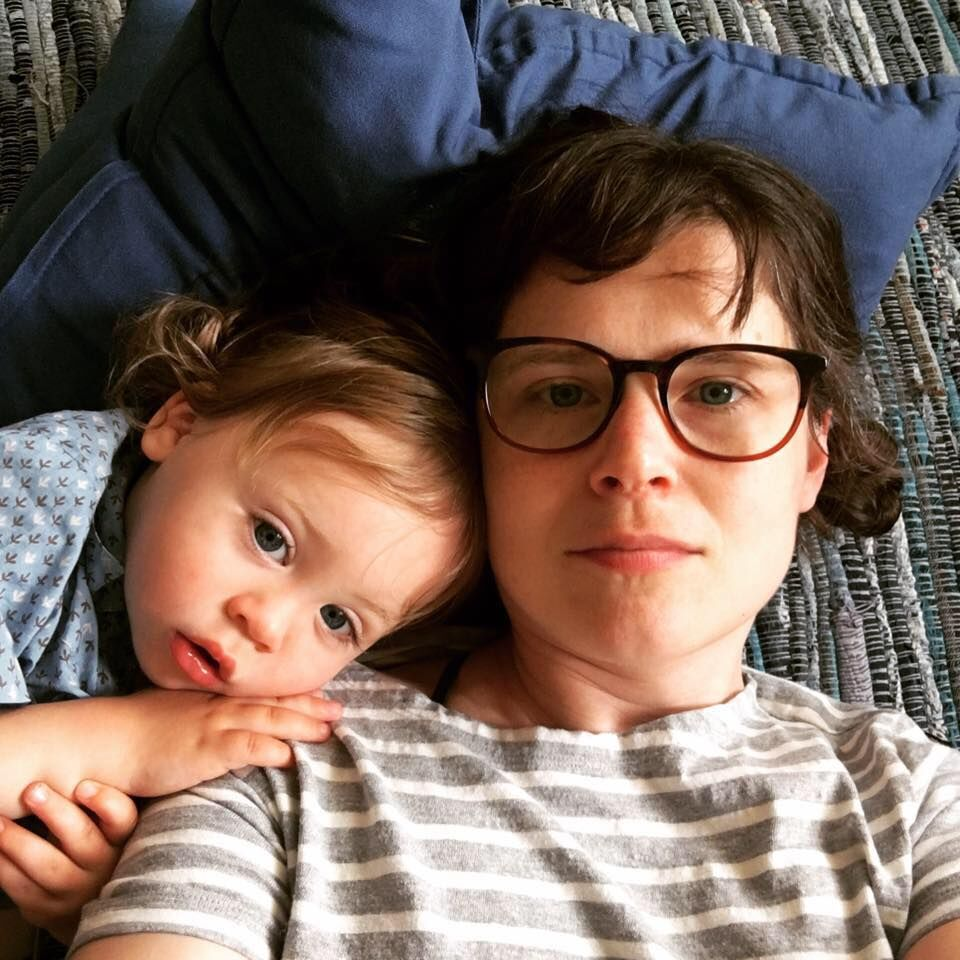
- Born: Grand Rapids, Michigan, U.S.
- Education: San Francisco State University (BA, 2001); CUNY Hunter College’s Integrated Media Arts Program (MFA)
- Occupations: Artist, curator, activist
- Known for: Activism on student debt
- Notable work: The Adventures of Dorrit Little
- Website: woolandbrick.com

Monica McKelvey Johnson, born in Grand Rapids, Michigan, is an artist, curator, and activist living in Brooklyn, New York.

== Education ==
McKelvey Johnson has received degrees from San Francisco State University (BA, 2001), and CUNY Hunter College’s Integrated Media Arts Program (MFA). She also studied painting at the Pratt Institute in New York City.

== Artwork ==
McKelvey Johnson was represented by The Jack Fischer Gallery in San Francisco and exhibited her artwork, including drawings, embroidery, gouache, in the show “STICK 'EM UP! STAY DOWN! GROW UP!” (June 14 - July 21, 2007). The exhibition was largely illustrative; Artweek described the works on display as “familiar and unnervingly odd”. She also creates and sells textile art.

She authored the webcomic The Adventures of Dorrit Little, which explores the plight of a graduate student with heavy debt who questions the wisdom of her education decisions and the value of her multiple degrees. Much of the protagonist's perspective and questions are based on McKelvey Johnson's own experience with student debt. The comic is based loosely on Charles Dickens’ novel Little Dorrit, which also confronts issues around debt, and seeks to create greater transparency around student debt. For the publication Food Equality in our City (2014), McKelvey Johnson created a comic strip representing interviews with Poughkeepsie residents who had experienced food insecurity. Her comics zine Riding for Two describes the need for greater awareness of the needs of pregnant people on public transit.

== Curatorial work ==
As a volunteer at the all-volunteer Interference Archive, McKelvey Johnson has co-organized several exhibitions, including Our Comics, Ourselves: Identity, Expression and Representation in Comic Art, which has toured to George Mason University, the Thomas J. Dodd Research Center on the University of Connecticut, Storrs Campus, and the University of Connecticut at Waterbury; as well as Take Back the Fight: Resisting Sexual Violence from the Ground Up. The catalog for Our Comics, Ourselves, edited with Jan Descartes and Ethan Heitner, includes writing from comics creators including Sophie Yanow, Sabrina Jones, William H. Foster III, Ganzeer, Paul Buhle, Jan Descartes, Sandy Jimenez, Nils Hanczar, John Jennings, Leela Corman, Elvis B., Jay Odjick, and A. K. Summers.

She has worked as a production manager for Creative Time and as Manager of Exhibitions at the Alliance for Young Artists & Writers, curating and archiving winning artwork from the Scholastic Art and Writing Awards.

== Writing ==
McKelvey Johnson writes about comics for The Rumpus and The Comics Journal. She has also written about student debt and arts education for The Hunts Point Express.

== Activism ==
McKelvey Johnson founded the student debtor support group EDU Debtors Union in 2011, to advocate for union representation for student debtors She has spoken about student debt at the Left Forum, at NYU’s Winning the Crisis: Debt * Narrative * Movements * Counter-Archives conference, March 21 and 22, 2012, and at the Station Independent Projects gallery. Her activism on student debt was combined with her artistic work in Faces of Debt, an interactive installation which encouraged participants to speak up about their own student debt experiences.
