= World War 3 Illustrated =

American comics anthology magazine

- Editor: Various, rotating editorial board
- Distributor: Top Shelf Productions
- Categories: Political magazine
- Frequency: bi-annual
- Circulation: 3,000–4,000
- Publisher: AK Press
- First issue: 1980
- Company: World War 3 Illustrated
- Country: United States
- Language: English
- Website: www.ww3.nyc

World War 3 Illustrated is an American comics anthology magazine with a left-wing political focus, founded in 1979 (though the first issue was published in 1980) by New York City comic book artists Peter Kuper and Seth Tobocman, and painter Christof Kohlhofer, and subsequently produced by a collective with a rotating editorship.

Other frequent contributors, mostly based in New York City, include Isabella Bannerman, Sue Coe, Scott Cunningham, Eric Drooker, Sandy Jimenez, Sabrina Jones, Mac McGill, Kevin Pyle, and James Romberger.

A predominantly black-and-white printed comic book story anthology, World War 3 Illustrated has featured full-color covers and occasional special color sections “within book.”

== Overview ==
Typical World War 3 Illustrated issues are focused on a single political issue, theme or broad subject, decided upon by the editorial staff. Artists and writers are then invited to develop material addressing the issue. It has been running for over 45 years of publication.

Unlike other comic book anthology-format magazines like Heavy Metal, Mad, or the defunct Epic Illustrated, World War 3 Illustrated is known less for character-based episodic features and more for the sustained or recurring presence of certain artists. The exception is Sandy Jimenez's "Shit House Poet", running exclusively in World War 3 Illustrated since 1991, making it the magazine's longest-running recurring feature with an identifiable single cast of characters. 2022 marked the feature's over 30 years of publication in the magazine.

== Publication history ==
The magazine initially began as a home for comic book work and graphic/illustrated storytelling that was anti-establishment and aggressively critical of the social and political right-wing conservatism in ascension after the election of President Ronald Reagan. In the spirit of the then-burgeoning DIY approach prevalent among independent punk and hardcore bands and musicians, the magazine took control of the means of production and distribution, foregoing possible relationships with established publishing institutions or companies for the sake of its own editorial integrity and political independence.

In the first decade of the magazine, its focus ranged from the global to the hyper-local, specifically addressing the politics and concerns affecting the neighborhoods of the Lower East Side of Manhattan: housing rights; gentrification; police brutality; racism; economic oppression. The 1988 Tompkins Square Park riot was a watershed event for the magazine's founders and artistic contributors, as much of the work in the anthology had focused squarely on the political issues leading to the riot, such as the city government's policies towards squatters and the homeless. When tensions brought the riot to its most dangerous points across the two-day conflict, much of the notable imagery associated with the grassroots resistance on improvised signage and wheat-pasted posters was appropriated from published work in the magazine created by Eric Drooker, Seth Tobocman, and others.

The late 1980s and 1990s saw an increasing diversity in both the number of new individual artists and writers contributing original comic book stories to World War 3 Illustrated, and a widening of the range in subject matter. The magazine has published a number of special issues on women/feminism, including Herstories (1992) Female Complaints (1999), Bitchcraft (2000), and Shameless Feminists (2021).

Issue #39, Wordless Words, was a 120-page collection of wordless comics released in January 2009.

In 2010–2011, New York's Exit Art gallery exhibited "Graphic Radicals", work from World War 3 Illustrated curated by Kuper, Tobocman, and Susan Willmarth celebrating the magazine's 30th anniversary.

Issue #49, published in 2017, was titled Now Is the Time of Monsters and focused on predatory capitalism.

Issue #50, Shameless Feminists, published in 2019, featured contributions from Sabrina Jones, Trina Robbins, Lauren Weinstein, Monica McKelvey Johnson, and Sandy Jimenez, among others.

In 2020 the magazine published a 220-page special issue titled "The World We Are Fighting For."

World War 3 Illustrated has historically carried advertising of fewer than ten pages total per issue, and has ranged in total page-count from 80 pages to 138 in recent issues of the last decade.

== Distribution ==
In the 1990s the magazine's distribution increased significantly, as Ruth Schwartz of Mordam Records took on the magazine's circulation fulfillment, ensuring that it would be present in outlets that already carried the notable music punk ‘zine Maximum Rocknroll. This distribution agreement took World War 3 Illustrated's issues international, as they were carried by Tower Records in all territories. The partnership with Mordam Records continued late into the 1990s, until World War 3 Illustrated handed its distribution over to Chris Staros of Top Shelf Productions and Diamond Comic Distributors. In 2017, AK Press took over publication of the magazine.

== Aesthetics, logo ==
The magazine's look is greatly informed by the work of its original founders, and also the era and context in which the anthology was initially developed: the 1980s DIY culture and grassroots activism. Much of the earlier work was created for the magazine with an eye toward visuals that could be easily reproduced in other media, such as silk-screened banners, posters, and T-shirts.

In the past decade, the magazine has increasingly published work that is more varied in its graphic approach, with increasing use of halftones, grayscaling, and fine linework alongside, the established hardline work and photocollage of years past.

The magazine's logo, an image of a globe superimposed over a blazing matchstick, is indicative of the magazine's philosophy concerning the need for vigilance and recognition of perennial conflicts and systems of ongoing oppression all over the world.

== Contributors and controversy ==
World War 3 Illustrated has provided an ongoing platform for many writers and artists active in the worlds of grassroots and leftist politics for the past 40 years. It has published work by controversial political figures, including journalism and essays by critics and academics

- Mike Diana: The magazine has published work by Mr. Diana, noted historically as the first American cartoonist legally jailed for obscenity.
- Mumia Abu-Jamal: The political activist and journalist, convicted of the 1981 murder of a police officer heavily disputed by left-wing groups, has had his writings illustrated and published in the magazine since the 1990s.
- Bill Ayers: The radical activist, academic, and co-founder of the 1960s militant leftist group Weather Underground provided the formal introduction to World War 3 Illustrated: 1979-2014 an anthology published by PM Press.
- Wayne Curtis: The Black Panther and climate change activist has written for the magazine.
- Magdy El Shafee, the Egyptian cartoonist whose work was banned by the Mubarak regime has written and drawn comics for the magazine.

Other contributors to World War 3 Illustrated include Peter Bagge, Fly, Spain Rodriguez, Art Spiegelman, Chuck Sperry, and Tom Tomorrow.

== Collections ==
- World War 3 Illustrated 1980-1988. (1989). Fantagraphics Books. ISBN 1560970022
- World War 3 Illustrated: Confrontational Comics. (1995). Four Walls Eight Windows. ISBN 1568580398
- World War 3 Illustrated: 1979–2014. (2014). PM Press. ISBN 9781604869583
