= Antonino D'Ambrosio =

American film producer

Antonino Pasquale D'Ambrosio (born June 23, 1971), is an Italian-American author, filmmaker, producer, and visual artist.

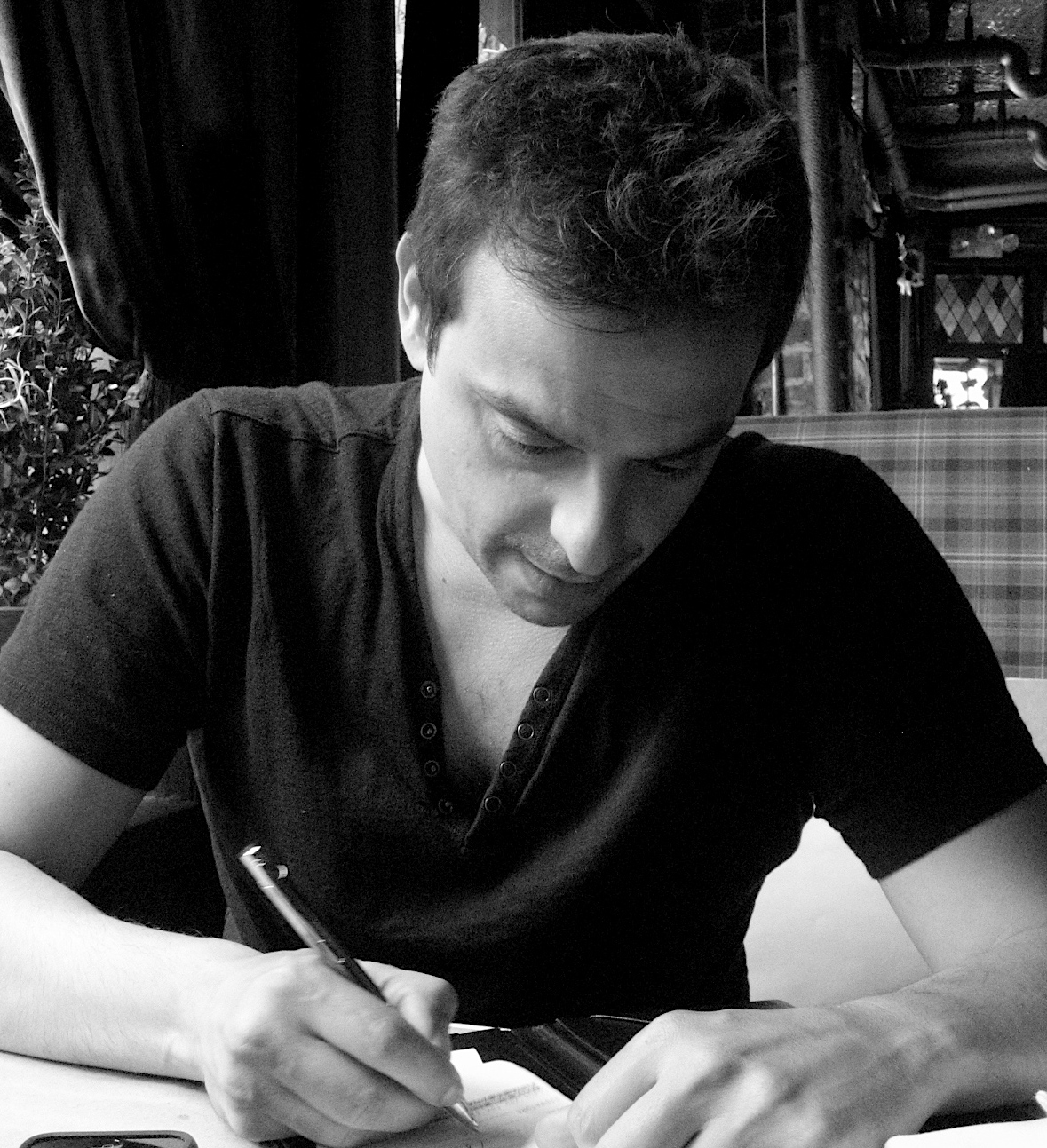

== Writing ==
D'Ambrosio is the author of Let Fury Have the Hour: Joe Strummer, Punk and the Movement that Shook the World (2012) and A Heartbeat and a Guitar: Johnny Cash and the Making of Bitter Tears. (2009) A Heartbeat and a Guitar was chosen by The Philadelphia Inquirer as a "2009 Book of Note", The Progressive "Favorite Book", The Boston Globe, among others.

In 2010, D'Ambrosio collaborated with artist Shepard Fairey and Jeffrey Deitch on the book Mayday.

In 2013, D'Ambrosio wrote the cover story "How the Creative Response of Artists and Activists Can Transform the World" for The Nation.

== Film and video ==
D'Ambrosio has produced more than 15 documentaries, films, videos, and visual art pieces. His recent film includes No Free Lunch starring Lewis Black. In September 2008, it received a notice of cultural distinction in Vanity Fair.

D'Ambrosio is the producer, writer and director of the feature film Let Fury Have the Hour. The film was an Official Selection of the 2012 Tribeca Film Festival. The film was received positively by The New York Times and Time Out New York's Joshua Rothkopf, Indiewire, PBS's POV, The Huffington Post, Complex magazine, and COOL magazine.

D'Ambrosio received support from Rob McKay of the McKay Foundation and the Democracy Alliance for production of a documentary film based on Let Fury Have the Hour chronicling the movement of world citizenship. The film has many musical contributions from artists including Chuck D, Antibalas Afrobeat Orchestra, Ocote Soul Sounds, Sean Hayes, Tommy Guerrero, Boots Riley, Tom Morello, Wayne Kramer, Billy Bragg and others. The film also features many of today's most creative thinkers and artists including playwright Eve Ensler, author Edwidge Danticat, scientist Jonah Lehrer, novelist Hari Kunzru, international human rights advocate Jack Healey, choreographer Elizabeth Streb, poets Staceyann Chin and Suheir Hammad, environmentalist Van Jones, and more. The film's score was composed by Wayne Kramer. The film includes original artwork from Shepard Fairey and animation by Seth Tobocman.

In 2014, D'Ambrosio was the executive producer of Look Again to the Wind: Johnny Cash's Bitter Tears Revisited, a tribute album.

In 2015, D'Ambrosio participated in the musical transmedia Soundhunters produced by a_BAHN and broadcast on the Franco-German channel Arte. D'Ambrosio directed the film Speak the way you breathe in which he directed the musician Luke Vibert.

== La Lutta NMC ==
In 1997 D'Ambrosio founded La Lutta NMC a non-profit media and film production group, the produces a range of work across diverse media.

== Other work ==
In 2010, artist Shepard Fairey invited D'Ambrosio to contribute the official essay for his solo-exhibit Mayday at the Deitch Projects in New York City. The essay, "May Day Calling", is printed on the back of Fairey's signature "flag" print.

In 2009, D'Ambrosio was Artist-In-Residence at the Center for Contemporary Arts in Santa Fe, NM where he launched the multimedia land-art installation La Terra Promessa: In Sun & Shadow.

In 2008, D'Ambrosio was featured on Clash: Revolution Rock, an hour-long radio show also featuring musician Tom Morello of Rage Against the Machine.

In 2006, he became New York University's Gallatin Lecturer, an honor bestowed upon a contemporary artist creating innovative and social engaging work. In 2006 D'Ambrosio was invited to document the Poor People's Economic Human Rights Campaign in Caracas, Venezuela at the World Social Forum. His short film documenting the experience, In the Land of Bolivar, has been screened around the world. In 2005, D'Ambrosio was Artist-In-Residence in the Media Arts Department at Long Island University, Brooklyn Campus. He speaks extensively at universities and colleges throughout the country.

== Bibliography ==
=== Books ===
- (2012) Let Fury Have the Hour: Joe Strummer, Punk, and the Movement that Shook the World.
- (2011). Paperback release of A Heartbeat and a Guitar: Johnny Cash and the Making of Bitter Tears.
- (2010). Mayday: The Art of Shepard Fairey.
- (2009). Democracy in Print: The Best of The Progressive magazine, 1909-2009. Contributor
- (2009). A Heartbeat and A Guitar: Johnny Cash and the Making of Bitter Tears. (NY: Basic Books/Nation Books)
- (2004). Let Fury Have the Hour: The Punk Rock Politics of Joe Strummer. (NY: Avalon Press/Nation Books)

=== Articles ===
- "Johnny Cash Risked His Career to Take a Stand". The New York Times. September 2014.
- d'Ambrosio, Antonino (January 2013). "How Creative Response Transforms Our World". The Nation.
- "The Free Space". The Huffington Post. April 2012.
- "Overdue Notice: Defend Our Libraries". The Progressive. November 2011.
- "On Ai Weiwei and Artist Suppression". The Progressive. June 2011.
- "Society Must be Defended". The Progressive. June 2011.
- "In Defense of Humans". The Progressive. June 2011.
- "An Interview with Rosanne Cash". The Progressive. October 2010.
- "Ozomatli's Musical Journey". The Progressive. September 2010.
- "Eduardo Galeano's Reflections of the World". Slepton. July 2010.
- "May Day Calling". Obey Giant. May 2010.
- "Howard Zinn: Historian of the Human Spirit". The Progressive. January 2010.
- "Gary Farmer: "Cultural Work is Our Survival". The Progressive. October 2009.
- "Green Day Never Gives Up!". The Progressive. August 2009.
- "Shepard Fairey's D.I.Y. Democracy". The Progressive. June 2009.
- "The John Sayles Interview". The Believer. March 2009.
- "The Only Band that Mattered". The Rumpus. December 2008.
- "Richard Price, American Realist". The Progressive. December 2008.
- "Lee Atwater's Legacy". The Nation. October 2008.
- "The Lamplighter: Walter Stafford, 1940-2008". The Progressive. December 2008.
- "The Bust Out". Monthly Review. June 2008.
- "Manu Chao, Globalista". The Progressive. March 2008.
- "M.I.A. in Action". The Progressive. January 2008.
- "Lewis Black: The Interview". The Progressive. April 2007.
- "When Worlds Collide". Monthly Review. July 2006.
- "Joe Strummer, Terrorist?". The Nation. April 2006.
- "In the Land of Bolivar". Monthly Review. February 2006.
- "Chuck D: The Interview". The Progressive. August 2005.
- "The Playwright vs. the Prime Minister". The Progressive. June 2004.
- "The People You Don't See". New Labor Forum. Summer 2004.
- "Up on the Block: The Power of People-Link". Clamor. Winter 2003. Archived from the original on August 7, 2008.
- "Soundtrack to Struggle". ColorLines Magazine. Winter 2003.
- "Let Fury have the Hour: The Passionate Politics of Joe Strummer". Monthly Review. June 2003.
- "Passion is a Fashion". Clamor. July 2002. Archived from the original on June 8, 2004.
- "Punk and Political". The Nation. 1998.

=== Publisher ===
- Fever Pitch. Publisher. (2004–2005)
- DISPATCH On-Line Indy News Journal. Publisher (2001–2003)

=== Films ===
- Let Fury Have the Hour (2012) Writer/Producer/Director.
- The Bending Cross. (2009). Producer/Director/Writer. 95 mins.
- Making Waves, Breaking Walls: The Story of Radio Atlantis. A Project of La Lutta NMC's Youth-Artist-in-Residency Program. (2009) Executive Producer. 12 mins.
- No Free Lunch (starring Lewis Black). (2008). Producer/writer/director. 7 mins.
- Project 843: A Documentary Series on the cultural Impact of Central Park. (2007–present) Executive producer and supervising director.
- In the Land of Bolivar. (2006). Writer, producer, photographer, and director. 10 mins.
- Battlescars. (2006). Production Consultant. 30 mins.
- Freedom Demo: The RNC Counter Convention. (2004) Producer, photographer, and editor. 25 mins.
- Desaparecidos: Our History Oral History Project. (2004). Writer, producer, photographer, director and editor. 55 mins.
- One Judge, One Family. (2004). Writer, producer, photographer, director, and editor. 17 mins.
- The Treatment Court Story. (2002) Writer, producer, photographer, director, editor. 15 mins.
- The Contract and Beyond. New York City Transit Workers Move Forward. (2002)Writer, producer, photographer, director, and editor. 25 mins.
- Road to the Contract: New York City Transit Worker's Documentary Series
- Struggle for a New Contract. (2002) Writer, producer, photographer, director, and editor. 25 mins.
- Back in the Days: A Time before Crack. (2000) Writer, producer, photographer, director, and editor. 30 mins.
- Once there was a Village. (1999). Based on the book of the same name. Producer, photographer, director, and editor. 30 mins
- Welfare Reform: Rollback or Removal? (1996). Writer, producer, photographer, director, and editor. 30 mins.

=== Awards ===
- (2009) Belmont Book Award (nominated).
- (2009) Artist-In-Residence. Center for Contemporary Arts. Santa Few, New Mexico
- (2008) Nation Institute Investigative Fund Award. Award to support investigative work on book project A Heartbeat and A Guitar
- (2006) New York University Gallatin Lecturer. An honor bestowed upon a contemporary artist creating innovative and socially engaging work.
- (2005) Artist-In-Residence, Long Island University Media Arts Department. An honor awarded to an artist producing dynamic and noteworthy new media.
- (2005) Top Non-Fiction Book Selections of 2005. Awarded by PBS to non-fiction writers who published work that could be used as an educational tool in the classroom.
- (2003) Digital-Artist-In-Residence (Given to La Lutta NMC). Awarded to emerging and established web artists working in the area of documenting the immigrant experience.
- (1999) Top Independent Media Makers. Awarded by The Nation readers to those individuals creating media that advances democracy.
- (1998) Community Service Award of Distinction. Awarded by the El Puente Center for Arts and Culture for support of youth-community public space mural initiative.
- (1998) Community Arts Grant. Awarded by the Manhattan Borough President's Office, New York City.
- (1995) Deans' Scholar. Awarded every 2 years to 20 New York University students demonstrating academic excellence, a strong social consciousness, and a vibrant creative sensibility.
