= Nature (TV program) =

- Genre: Natural history; Documentary
- Created by: George Page
- Narrated by: Various (depending on each episode)
- Theme music composer: Alex Lasarenko
- Country of origin: United States
- Original language: English
- No. of seasons: 44
- No. of episodes: 671 (December 18, 2025) (list of episodes)

Production
- Executive producers: Fred Kaufman (1991–present); David Heeley (1982–1991)
- Running time: 55 minutes
- Production company: Thirteen/WNET New York

Original release
- Network: PBS
- Release: October 10, 1982 – present

Nature is a wildlife television show produced by Thirteen/WNET New York. It has been distributed to United States public television stations by the PBS television service since its debut on October 10, 1982. Some episodes may appear in syndication on many PBS member stations around the United States. This series currently airs on Wednesdays on PBS (formerly on Sundays through 2011).

It is a weekly one-hour program that consists of documentaries about various animals and ecosystems. The on-camera host of the first season was Donald Johanson, with voice-over narration by George Page. Starting with the 1983 season, Page became both the on-camera host and the narrator until the series' 19th season in 2000. Since then, Academy Award winner F. Murray Abraham has frequently narrated episodes, as has ecologist Chris Morgan. Nature had close ties with the UK series Natural World, which was broadcast by BBC Two from 1983 to 2020.

The program uses a silhouette of a camel thorn tree as its logo.

== Nominations and awards ==
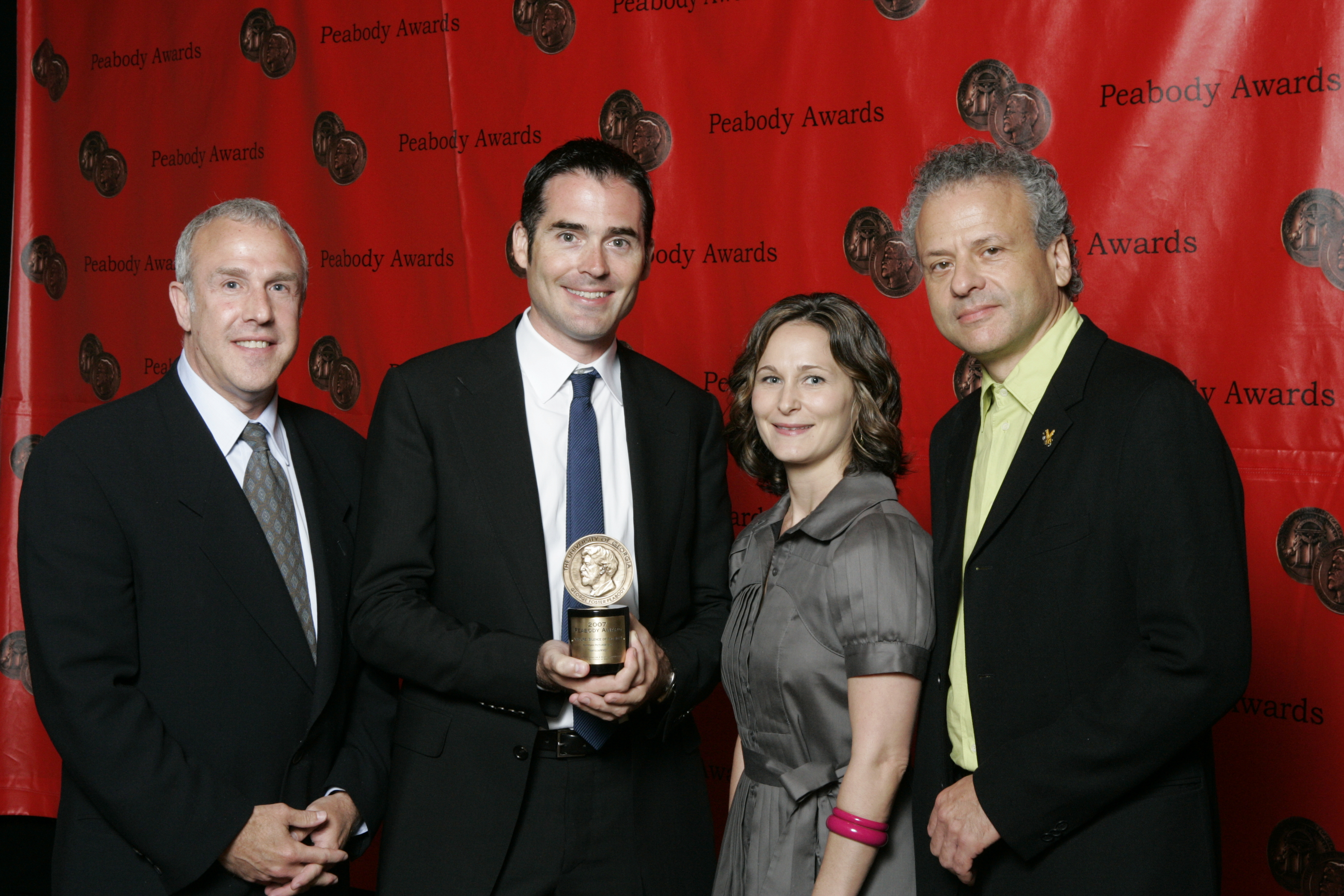
Fred Kaufman and the crew of NATURE-Silence of the Bees at the 67th Annual Peabody Awards

Nature has been nominated for 22 Emmy Awards, winning 8 during its longevity. In 1986, host George Page was nominated for best Outstanding Individual Achievements in Informational Programming. In 1988 and 1989, it won two Emmy Awards for best Outstanding Informational Series. In 2000, it was nominated for best Outstanding Main Title Design. The episode "Silence of the Bees" won a Peabody Award in 2007.

Nature received the Stibitz-Wilson Award from the American Computer & Robotics Museum in 2023. The award was accepted by executive producer Fred Kaufman, series producer Bill Murphy, and series editor Janet Hess.

== Reception ==
Nature has received generally positive reviews from television critics. Linda Stasi of New York Post called it, "A wonderful, remarkable show. Don’t miss it." David Bianculli of TV Worth Watching called the miniseries "Attenborough's Life Stories", "Beautiful and inspiring." Kaitlin Milligan of Broadway World wrote, "Awe-inspiring."

== In other media ==
=== Comic book ===
Three issues of a Nature comic book were produced from 2006–2008. They were full-color corollaries to on-air episodes like "Silence of the Bees," "In the Valley of the Wolves," and "The Beauty of Ugly." Nature Comics was targeted at pre-teens and teenagers as an educational tool, and was distributed for free to museums, schools, and nature centers.

Nature Comics featured the talents of a number of notable cartoonists, including Josh Neufeld, Rick Veitch, Lauren Weinstein, and Thomas Yeates. The series was edited by David Reisman.

Nature Comics #2 was given an Association of Educational Publishers 2008 Distinguished Achievement Award (in the Specialized Audience Instruction/Graphic Novel category).

==== Issues ====
Nature Comics #1 (2006) — related episodes: "Christmas in Yellowstone" (Season 23), "Penguins of the Antarctic" (Season 23), and "Chimpanzees: An Unnatural History" (Season 23)

- Mark Schultz (cover art)
- Jonathan Bennett
- Rick Veitch
- Lauren Weinstein
- R. Kikuo Johnson
- Sabrina Jones

Nature Comics #2 (2007) — related episodes: "Silence of the Bees" (Season 24), "In the Valley of the Wolves" (Season 24), and "The Beauty of Ugly" (Season 24)

- Rick Veitch
- Lauren Weinstein
- R. Kikuo Johnson (cover art and inside story)
- Thomas Yeates
- Josh Neufeld
- Jeffrey Lewis

The Unexpected World of Nature (a.k.a. Nature Comics #3) (2008) — related episodes: "The Dragon Chronicles" (Season 25), "The Wolf That Changed America" (Season 25), and "Frogs: The Thin Green Line" (Season 25)

- Rick Veitch (cover and inside story)
- Thomas Yeates
- Sabrina Jones
- R. Kikuo Johnson
- Lauren Weinstein
- Hope Larson
- Josh Neufeld

== See also ==
- Natural World
- Survival
- The Nature of Things
