= George Page (television presenter) =

American journalist, author, and television host (1935-2006)

- Born: George Henson Page; March 31, 1935; Hartwell, Georgia, U.S.
- Died: June 28, 2006 (aged 71); Equinunk, Pennsylvania, U.S.
- Education: Emory University (1957)
- Occupation(s): Television host, narrator, producer, editor, journalist
- Years active: 1959–1998
- Employer(s): WSB-TV; NBC News (1959–1972); WNET (1972–1998)
- Known for: Nature (creator)
- Awards: Emmys: Won (1980); Nominated (1980, 1981, 1986)

George Henson Page (March 31, 1935 – June 28, 2006) was an American journalist, author, and television host, who was known for his love of nature and his unique and mellifluous voice. He created the PBS series Nature, hosting and narrating it from its beginning in 1982 until his retirement in 1998.

== Biography ==
Page was also the director of Science and Natural History Programming at the PBS station Thirteen/WNET. In between seasons of Nature, he also hosted and narrated two series: The Brain (1983) and The Mind (1988).

Prior to his time with PBS, Page had a long career in broadcast journalism, mostly at NBC. He covered the Vietnam War in 1968 as a foreign correspondent and directed a documentary "We Won't Go" that explores the draft resisters. In 1990, Emory University, the school Page had graduated from in 1957, awarded him with the honorary degree Doctor of Humane Letters, citing his "contributions to science education in the United States".

In May 1995, Page was awarded another honorary degree from Pace University, for helping television viewers "understand and celebrate in all its diversity the world in which we live." In 1998, Page retired from PBS Nature after illness of throat cancer. George Page died of cancer on June 28, 2006, in Equinunk, Pennsylvania.

Page also wrote the book Inside the Animal Mind, published in 1999.
