= God Is My Co-Pilot (band) =

Band from New York City

- Origin: New York City, New York
- Genres: Queercore, experimental rock, noise rock, no wave
- Years active: 1991–present
- Labels: Outpunk, Knitting Factory, Avant, Atavistic, Shrimper
- Members: Craig Flanagin, Sharon Topper, Normandy Sherwood, Jason Blackkat, Fredrik Haake, Daria Klotz, Kevin Shea, Jer Reid

God Is My Co-Pilot (often abbreviated as GodCo) is a no wave queercore band from New York City formed in 1991. The two primary members throughout the 90s were the openly queer couple of vocalist Sharon Topper and guitarist Craig Flanagin. The last recordings with Topper were made in 1998 (though the group continued to perform occasionally until 2012).

There was no further activity until 2018 when the band released a demo on both cassette and Bandcamp, began playing frequent shows in NYC, and toured the UK. The current line-up consists of Flanagin playing guitar, Normandy Sherwood (of the National Theater of the United States of America) on vocals & electronics, long-standing members Jason Blackkat on bass, Jer Reid on guitar, and Fredrik Haake on drums, with new members Hajnal Pivnick on violin, and Kevin Shea on drums.

The group has been recording new music since 2018; both a single and an album drawn from these recordings, which include contributions from cellist Fred Lonberg-Holm, drummer Genny Slag, and guitarist Mark Jickling, are slated for release in 2022.

God Is My Co-Pilot is known for being prolific (see discography below). All of their material has been released on independent record labels or self-released. Their own self-run label The Making Of Americans (named after the novel of the same name by Gertrude Stein) released music by Jad Fair, Cat Power, Dairy Queen Empire, Dawson, and The Scissor Girls among others.

Former members of God Is My Co-Pilot include keyboardist Anthony Coleman, vocalist/bassist Fly; bassists James Garrison, Alex Klein, Daria Grace and Ann Rupel; cellist Fred Lonberg-Holm; and drummers Dan Brown, Michael Evans, Christine Bard and Siobhan Duffy.

The group is often joined by guest musicians. These have included Frank London, Kenny Wollesen, Sandy Ewen, Margaret Fiedler McGinnis, Elliott Sharp, Marion Coutts, Jim Sauter, Catherine Jauniaux, Gen Ken Montgomery, Andy Haas, John Zorn and Jad Fair.

The band's lyrics frequently address sexuality and gender. The band states, in their song, We Signify, "...We're co-opting rock, the language of sexism, to address gender identity on its own terms of complexity...." They occasionally sing in languages other than English: some of their output has been in French, Quebecois, Cajun, Swabian, Yiddish, German, Finnish, Turkish, among others. Their sound has been described as experimental, noise rock, hardcore punk and avant jazz. Stay Free zine said of the music, "We hear a new sound, 'free punk' we'll call it."

== Discography ==
=== Albums ===
- I Am Not This Body (1992) Making Of Americans
- Speed Yr. Trip (1992) Making Of Americans
- Straight Not (1993) Outpunk
- What Doctors Don't Tell You (1993) Shrimper Records
- Getting Out of Boring Time Biting Into Boring Pie (1993) Quinnah Records
- How To Be (1994) Making Of Americans
- Sex is For Making Babies (1994) Disques Du Soleil Et De L'acier
- Mir Shlufn Nisht (1994) Avant Records
- Puss 02 (1995) Dark Beloved Cloud
- Children Can Be So Cruel (1997)
- Get Busy (1998) Atavistic Records

==== Compilations/Live ====
- Tight Like Fist (1993) Knitting Factory
- History Of Music: Vol 1 1989-1991 (1995) Meldac [Japan]
- History Of Music: Vol 2 1991-1993 (1996) Meldac [Japan]
- Peel Sessions (1996) Strange Fruit
- The Best Of (1996) Atavistic
- Je Suis Trop Content (1997) Dark Beloved Cloud

=== Singles ===
- Songs of Praise (1991)
- Refused Medical Attention (1991)
- On A Wing And A Prayer (1992) Funky Mushroom
- Gender is As Gender Does (1992) Funky Mushroom
- How I Got Over (1993) Ajax Records
- My Sinister Hidden Agenda (1993) Blackout Records
- Pissing and Hooting (1993) Dark Beloved Cloud
- Illusions Of Secrecy (1993) Dark Beloved Cloud
- When you See This Remember Me (1993) Dark Beloved Cloud
- Ykt Flot! (1993)
- Sharon Quite Fancies Jo (1994) Soul Static Sound
- This Is No Time To Be Frail (1994) Rough Trade Records
- Kitty Bait (1994) Ajax
- An Appeal To Reason (1995) Runt Records
- Ootko sä poika vai tyttö? (1995) Trash Can

=== Compilation appearances ===
- Probable Cause; Life under Occupation; Held Down—split single with Fifth Column (1993) Outpunk
- "Anatomically Correct" on Rock Stars Kill (1994) Kill Rock Stars
- Butch Flip God Is My Co-Pilot/ Melt Banana split single (1994)
- God Is My Co-Pilot / Bz Bz Ueu split 7-inch (1998) (Music à la Coque)
- Erase-yer-head No. 9—split EP with Melt Banana, Tear of a Doll, Camp Blackfoot (1999) Pandemonium
