= Fly (artist) =

American comic book artist, illustrator, activist, and teacher

- Born: Elen Orr; Halifax, Nova Scotia, Canada
- Known for: Comix, illustration, drawing, graphic art, collage
- Movement: Comix, zines. punk, squat culture

Elen Orr, known as Fly, is a comic book artist, illustrator, activist, and teacher whose art has been published in various magazines and fanzines, including Slug and Lettuce, Maximum Rock 'N' Roll, World War 3 Illustrated, and The Village Voice, among others. She is also a former member of New York queercore punk band God Is My Co-Pilot.

Fly came to work in New York in the late 1980s, and got involved with ABC No Rio, a social center for punks and artists located at 156 Rivington street in New York City's Lower East Side. She is a member of the World War 3 Illustrated collective, and a contributor to the anthology Juicy Mother 2, edited by Jennifer Camper, which was published by Manic D Press in 2007.

In 2003, Fly exhibited her art at the Cartoon Art Museum in San Francisco, California. She has also produced cover artwork for Hungry March Band, Adeline Records and Geykido Comet Records. Aside from freelance cover artwork, she has printed many photocopy zines of her artwork and published books. In 1998, Fly had her first book, CHRON!IC!RIOTS!PA!SM!, published by Autonomedia. In 2003, she published a graphic novel-style book named PEOPS, a collection of portraits and stories about people Fly has met. The book was released by Soft Skull Press, and subtitled "Portraits and Stories of People". In 2006, she was invited as a guest speaker at the Victoria International Arts Symposium. In December this same year, Fly appeared at the Grace Comics showcase alongside Elizabeth Merrick.

Aside from visual arts, Fly also engages in the spoken word and musical collage art of her band Zero Content (named after one of her comic strips) which can be heard on several Geykido Comet Records Compilations. Previously, she played bass and sang for several years with Craig Flanagin in the band God Is My Co-Pilot, with which she went on tours in the 1990s.

As of 2020, Fly’s zine archive has been acquired by the Minneapolis Institute of Arts.
