= Chris Morgan (ecologist) =

British ecologist and conservationist

- Born: November 10, 1968 (age 57); Wigan, England
- Occupations: ecologist, conservationist, TV host, public speaker, filmmaker, podcaster, and author
- Known for: PBS Nature, bear research, environmental education, wildlife conservation, wilderness guiding, 'THE WILD with Chris Morgan' podcast

Chris Morgan is a British-born ecologist, conservationist, TV host, filmmaker, podcaster, and author. His ecology and conservation work focuses on bears and other large carnivores worldwide. Over the last 25 years Morgan has worked as a wildlife researcher, wilderness guide, and environmental educator on every continent where bears exist.

He emigrated to the US from the UK in 1997, and in the year 2000 co-founded the award-winning community-based education program, the Grizzly Bear Outreach Project (GBOP; now Western Wildlife Outreach, WWO), which was designed to bring scientifically credible information about grizzly bears and recovery to local communities of the North Cascades in Washington State.

Through his work as a wilderness guide he has escorted hundreds of people on various exploratory expeditions.

Morgan has been a featured television host and/or contributor in productions for PBS, National Geographic Television, BBC, Discovery Channel, and has appeared on the Late Show with David Letterman. In addition to TV hosting he has also become a familiar voice of the television series PBS Nature having narrated numerous films since 2011 on topics ranging from lions to pelicans and the Australian outback.

Chris authored the book Bears of the Last Frontier. This large format publication describes the experience, the bears, and behind-the-scenes insight from the production of the PBS Nature and National Geographic episodes of the same title that Chris co-created and hosted.

Chris is the co-founder of Wildlife Media, a non profit organization that produced BEARTREK, a feature-length documentary that follows Chris’ journey by motorcycle to Alaska, Peru, the Canadian north, and Borneo. The film's campaign has generated support and exposure for critical conservation projects in these areas. Wildlife Media also focuses on finding and supporting young conservationists as “Ambassadors” for their passion species.

== Early life ==
Morgan was born 10 November 1968 in Wigan, England.

At the age of 18, while working at a summer camp in New Hampshire, Morgan met a bear biologist who invited him to help tranquilize, process and track American black bears at a study site in northern New Hampshire. Afterward, he changed his college focus from graphic design to ecology. At 19, he took a road trip to Northern Spain in search of bears and wolves to complete a report required for his Higher National Diploma in Conservation Management. He also took a six-month placement position with the Northwest Territories Department of Renewable Resources in 1991 to assist with grizzly bear, wolf, and muskox research. Also in his early 20s, Morgan traveled to the Canadian Rockies to collar and track grizzly bears for a research project near Banff National Park for two consecutive seasons, tracking grizzly bears by foot for over 2000 miles. In the 1990s, Morgan studied Spanish brown bears in the Cantabrian Mountains of Spain, grizzly bears in Calgary and the Northwest Territories of Canada, and performed spectacled bear study viability research in Ecuador. In 1994, at the age of 26, Morgan joined the Himalayan Wildlife Project in Pakistan to research the brown bears of the Deosai Plateau.

== Education ==
Morgan has received a Higher National Diploma in Conservation Management from Farnborough College of Technology, Farnborough, UK, a Bachelor of Science in Applied Ecology from East London, UK and a master's degree in Advanced Ecology from the University of Durham, UK. For his master's thesis research, Morgan studied female red squirrels in the southern Kielder Forest, England.

== Conservation work ==
=== Wildlife Media ===
Morgan is the Executive Director of Wildlife Media, a non-profit production company whose debut feature film 'BEARTREK' promotes global bear conservation and education.

=== GBOP/WWO ===
Morgan was co-founder of the Grizzly Bear Outreach Project (GBOP), now Western Wildlife Outreach (WWO) in 2002. The non-profit organization began with grizzly bear safety and coexistence education efforts, but has since expanded to include wolf and cougar education.

== TV and film – selected works ==
=== 'BEARTREK' (film) ===
Morgan's feature-length film 'BEARTREK' is an independent documentary/adventure/travel film located in Alaska, Peru, Borneo, and Manitoba, Canada that focuses on four bear species and four biologists who study them. Morgan conceived 'BEARTREK' as a film and campaign that would support bear conservation efforts around the world and is a collaboration between Morgan (Executive producer/host/narrator) and nature-cinematographer/director, Joe Pontecorvo (Producer/director). The 'BEARTREK' film documents the scientific studies of Robyn Appleton and her Spectacled Bear Conservation Society and their conservation efforts in Northern Peru; Dr. Nick Lunn on polar bears in Manitoba, Canada; Siew Te Wong on sun bears in Borneo; and Chris Morgan's experiences with brown/grizzly bears in Alaska. The documentary also features an element of adventure and discovery as Morgan rides his motorcycle to study sites. The 'BEARTREK' campaign is "a giant experiment that brings a new approach to raising awareness and funding for conservation through a high end theatrical film, a campaign, and a social media movement."

=== 'Born In The Rockies' (international TV series) ===
Morgan narrated this award winning series in 2022 for international release. 'Born in the Rockies' follows the lives of several courageous animal families as they struggle to raise their young in one of the most challenging habitats on Earth – North America's Rocky Mountains. The film explores the inner lives of family life, and reveals just how challenging it can be for a youngster growing up in the Rockies. They must learn how to navigate their environment, understand the rules of their society, and face the challenges of a rapidly changing world. A production of PONTECORVO PRODUCTIONS and THE WNET GROUP in co-production with TERRA MATER FACTUAL STUDIOS in association with PBS and CPB receiving world wide recognition including the following: 2022 Cannes Corporate Media & TV Awards 2022 (Cannes, France): Gold Dolphin (Category: Nature and Wildlife) New York Wild Film Festival 2023 (New York, USA): Finalist Episode 01; Mountainfilm International Filmfestival Graz 2022 (Graz, Austria): Official Selected Episode 02; FINN - Festival International Nature Namur 2022 (Namur, Belgium): Official Selected Episode 02; Sondrio Festival 2022 (Sondrio, Italy): Official Selected Episode 02; WFFR - Wildlife Film Festival Rotterdam 2022 (Rotterdam, Netherlands): Official Selected Episode 01; MAFF - Matsalu Nature Film Festival 2022 (Lihula, Estonia): Official Selected Episode 01; International Wildlife Film Festival 2022 (Montana, USA): Finalist (Category: Youth Program)

=== 'Why Bears?' (film) ===
Morgan co-wrote and narrated this short film made for teachers, scientists, non-profits and people interested in bears and preserving wild spaces. The film was made possible by an anonymous donation and was produced in partnership with Wildlife Media and TriFilm. The film's premise is that “What's good for bears is good for people and the planet.” It explains the ecological and conservation roles that bears can play, and that by protecting them it is conceivable to protect the area represented by their global distribution - about one third of the planet's land mass (does not include circumpolar ice region occupied by polar bears).

=== 'Animal Homes' (PBS Nature TV series) ===
On April 8, 15, and 22, 2015, a three-part series titled 'Animal Homes' hosted and narrated by Morgan aired on PBS 'NATURE.' 'Animal Homes' examines the various structures, building methods, and social networks utilized by animals in the wild to protect themselves and their young from predators, invaders, and the natural elements. The series' first episode ('The Nest') focuses on what birds build to house their clutches of eggs using only their beaks and feet and the social interactions they confront while incubating and raising their young. Morgan is shown trying his hand at building a structurally sound nest, testing the strength of other avian structures, and presenting the collection of bird's nests owned by the Peabody Museum of Natural History at Yale University. Episode two ('Location Location Location'), examines the importance of choosing an appropriate environment for an animal's home and the strategies employed in maximizing their success. In the episode, Morgan observes the dam and lodge building rituals of beavers, the protective relationship between hummingbird bird nests and their proximity to those of raptors, and takes part in the processing of a mother black bear and her cubs who had been hibernating in the forests of Maryland. Morgan is featured in the third episode ('Animal Cities') observing a colony of nesting puffins in northwest Scotland, scuba diving off of Corsica to inspect the complex social and reproductive strategies of the oscillated wrasse, and excavating the fungal garden of a leaf-cutter ant nest in the rainforest.

=== 'The Last Orangutan Eden' (PBS Nature TV) ===
Morgan hosted and narrated 'The Last Orangutan Eden' for PBS 'NATURE' which aired on February 25, 2015. To make this documentary about the dwindling population of orangutans and the efforts of conservationists to protect them, Morgan traveled to Northern Sumatra for filming. Morgan can be seen interacting with young orangutan orphans, searching the forest for wild orangutans and their nests, and accompanying the conservationist Ian Singleton on a journey to relocate a rehabilitated orangutan candidate-for-release. 'The Last Orangutan Eden' won an Emmy Award in 2016 for “Outstanding Music & Sound.”

=== 'Siberian Tiger Quest' (aka 'Hunt for the Russian Tiger') ===
PBS 'NATURE' began its 31st season with the episode 'Siberian Tiger Quest' hosted/narrated by Morgan who traveled to Siberia for filming. The episode aired October 10, 2012. In the episode, Morgan met with Korean filmmaker Sooyong Park in Siberia to recount Park's efforts at filming Siberian tigers in the wild while embedded for five years and also to attempt to capture a tiger on film again. The episode was nominated for an Emmy Award for "Outstanding Nature Programming", and also received awards for "Best Presenter/Host", "Best Cinematography", "Best Human/Wildlife Interaction", "Gold Award", and "Outstanding Contribution to Wildlife Filmmaking Award."

=== 'Bears of the Last Frontier' (aka 'Bear Nomad') ===
For two years, Morgan and filmmaker Joe Pontecorvo worked on a three-hour, three-part mini-series filmed and produced for PBS 'NATURE' and National Geographic Television International called 'Bears of the Last Frontier' which highlights the three bear species in the state of Alaska. Co-created by Morgan and Pontecorvo, the show was hosted and narrated by Morgan as the feature character with Pontecorvo acting as producer, director, and cinematographer. The mini-series aired in May 2011. During promotion for 'Bears of the Last Frontier' (May 10, 2011), Morgan was a guest on the 'Late Show with David Letterman.' Morgan also wrote a book named for the mini-series featuring large print photos and behind-the-scenes stories of 'Bears of the Last Frontier' released in 2011. For his work on the episode 'Bears of the Last Frontier: Arctic Wanderers,' Morgan was awarded "Best Presenter/Host" at the 2012 International Wildlife Film Festival (IWFF). Joe Pontecorvo, also, earned a 2012 Emmy Award Nomination ('Outstanding Individual Achievement in a Craft: Cinematography - Documentary and Long Form') for the same episode.

=== PBS 'NATURE' narration ===
Morgan's other television work for PBS 'NATURE' includes narration on the episodes: 'Love in the Animal Kingdom' (2013), 'Great Zebra Exodus' (2013), 'Magic of the Snowy Owl' (2012), 'Fortress of the Bears' (2012), 'Kangaroo Mob' (2012), 'The Animal House' (2011), 'Survivors of the Firestorm' (2011), 'Outback Pelicans' (2011), 'The Himalayas' (2011), 'Elsa's Legacy: The Born Free Story' (2011), and 'Echo: An Elephant to Remember' (2010).

=== 'Great Bear Stakeout' (BBC/Discovery TV series) ===
The BBC/Discovery Channel production 'Great Bear Stakeout' aired in two parts on BBC One April 24 and 25, 2013 with Morgan as an ecologist and bear expert. 'Great Bear Stakeout' documents the awakening of Alaskan grizzly bears from hibernation through their feeding on the salmon run utilizing specialized camera gear and hidden camera techniques. The program received positive reviews by viewers. The show aired in one part on the Discovery Channel May 12, 2013.

=== 'Land of the Lost Wolves' ===
'Land of the Lost Wolves' premiered on BBC One in two episodes on April 5 &6, 2012. Morgan is featured as an onscreen scientist in episode two, tracking wolves on the BC coast of Canada.

=== 'Grizzlies of Alaska' ===
Morgan was host, narrator, and featured character in an episode of the BBC Two series 'Natural World' titled 'Grizzlies of Alaska' which he co-created with 'BEARTREK' director/producer and cinematographer Joe Pontecorvo. The episode originally aired on March 8, 2012.

== Filmography ==
Title	Network/Series	Year	Role	Notes	Source
Grizzly ReWild	CBC The Nature Of Things/Q Camera Productions	2023	Narrator	International Version	
Born In The Rockies	PONTECORVO PRODUCTIONS and THE WNET GROUP in co-production with TERRA MATER FACTUAL STUDIOS in association with PBS and CPB	2022	Narrator	2022 Cannes Corporate Media & TV Awards 2022 (Cannes, France): Gold Dolphin (Category: Nature and Wildlife)	
Woodpeckers: The Hole Story - PBS- Intl teaser and show narration	Coneflower Productions (Blue Ant/Love Nature)	2022	Narrator		
Collision	Wildlife Media / Ocean Souls	2022	Narrator		
Path of The Bear	Wildlife Media / BEARTREK	2022	Host/Narrator		
Loco-Motion	Terra Mater Factual Studios	2022	Narrator		
Stories from The Salish Sea	SoulCraft Allstars	2021	Host/Narrator		
Pandas: Born to be Wild	PBS/NATURE	2020	Narrator		
A Song for Love: An Ape with an App	Terra Mater Factual Studios	2020	Narrator		
Snow Leopards and Friends	Terra Mater Factual Studios	2020	Narrator		
Dehesa – Forest of the Iberian Lynx	Terra Mater Factual Studios	2020	Narrator		
Cantabria – Spain's magical Mountains	Terra Mater Factual Studios	2019	Narrator		
Earth - The Nature of our Planet: Episode 3: Water	Terra Mater Factual Studios	2018	Narrator		
Earth - The Nature of our Planet: Episode 2: Land	Terra Mater Factual Studios	2018	Narrator		
Earth - The Nature of our Planet: Episode 1: Air	Terra Mater Factual Studios	2018	Narrator		
Return of the Panther?	Chris Morgan Wildlife/UPROAR	2018	Host/narrator		
Grizzly Encounters with Chris Morgan: There Private Life of Bears: Episode 2	Marco Polo Films	2018	Host/narrator		
Grizzly Encounters With Chris Morgan: The Hunger Challenge: Episode 1	Marco Polo Films	2018	Host/narrator		
Grey Area: Wolves of the Southwest	Documentary	2017	Narrator		
Cheetah Children	PBS/NATURE	2017	Narrator		
Jeff Bridges and the Grizzly Bear	Chris Morgan Wildlife Short Film	2017			
BEARTREK	Documentary	2016	Host/narrator		
Time for the Grizzly?	Chris Morgan Wildlife Short Film	2016	Host/narrator		
Wanted: Grizzly Bears?	Chris Morgan Wildlife Short Film	2016	Host/narrator		
Grizzlies Quizz: How Much Do You Know About Grizzly Bears?	Chris Morgan Wildlife Short Film	2016	Host/narrator		
Golden Eagle - Call of the Wild '90	Terra Mater	2016	Narrator		
Wild Winners: The Power of the Velvet Paw: Episode 1	Terra Mater	2016	Narrator		
Wild Winners: Freaky Feathers: Episode 2	Terra Mater	2016	Narrator		
Wild Winners: Planet of the Primates: Episode 3	Terra Mater	2016	Narrator		
Nature's Greatest Talents: Smart & Smarter: Episode 1	Terra Mater	2016	Narrator		
Nature's Greatest Talents: The Art of Seduction: Episode 2	Terra Mater	2016	Narrator		
Operation Gold Rush: with Dan Snow	BBC	2016	Contributor: Wildlife Expert		
Nature's Greatest Talents: Masters of Disguise: Episode 3	Terra Mater	2016	Narrator		
Animal Homes: Animal Cities	PBS/NATURE	2015	Host/narrator	PBS/Terra Mater	
Animal Homes: Location, Location, Location	PBS/NATURE	2015	Host/narrator	PBS/Terra Mater	
Animal Homes: The Nest	PBS/NATURE	2015	Host/narrator	PBS/Terra Mater	
The Last Orangutan Eden	PBS/NATURE & National Geographic Channels International	2015	Host/narrator	PBS/National Geographic	
Foca Island - The Island of Secrets		2013	Narrator	Produced by Terra Aquatica	
Love in the Animal Kingdom	PBS/NATURE	2013	Narrator		
Great Zebra Exodus	PBS/NATURE	2013	Narrator		
Great Bear Stakeout	BBC/Discovery	2013	Ecologist/bear expert		
Land of the Lost Wolves	BBC/Discovery	2012	On-screen biologist	Episode 2	
Grizzlies of Alaska	Natural World	2012	Host/narrator		
Magic of the Snowy Owl	PBS/NATURE	2012	Narrator		
Why Bears?		2012	Narrator/Co-Writer	Wildlife Media/Trifilm	
Siberian Tiger Quest	PBS/NATURE	2012	Host/narrator	PBS/Terra Mater	
Fortress of the Bears	PBS/NATURE	2012	Narrator		
Kangaroo Mob	PBS/NATURE	2012	Narrator		
The Animal House	PBS/NATURE	2011	Narrator		
Bears of the Last Frontier: Arctic Wanderers	PBS/NATURE & National Geographic Channels International	2011	Host/narrator	PBS/National Geographic	
Bears of the Last Frontier: The Road North	PBS/NATURE & National Geographic Channels International	2011	Host/narrator	PBS/National Geographic	
Bears of the Last Frontier: City of Bears	PBS/NATURE & National Geographic Channels International	2011	Host/narrator	PBS/National Geographic	
Survivors of the Firestorm	PBS/NATURE	2011	Narrator		
Outback Pelicans	PBS/NATURE	2011	Narrator		
The Himalayas	PBS/NATURE	2011	Narrator		
Elsa's Legacy: The Born Free Story	PBS/NATURE	2011	Narrator		
Echo: An Elephant to Remember	PBS/NATURE	2010	Narrator		

== Awards ==
(Year: Name of Award)

2022: Cannes Corporate Media & TV Awards 2022 (Cannes, France): Gold Dolphin (Category: Nature and Wildlife) for Born In The Rockies - Terra Mater/Pontecorvo Productions

2022: New York Wild Film Festival 2023 (New York, USA): Finalist Episode 01 Born In The Rockes

2022: International Wildlife Film Festival 2022 (Montana, USA): Finalist (Category: Youth Program)
2017: “Nomination” for “Nature: Animal Homes – Natural Born Engineers: The Nest” at Festival International du Film Animalier (FIFA)
2016: “Emmy Award” for ‘Nature: The Last Orangutan Eden,’ “Outstanding Music & Sound,” Scot Charles & David Mitchum, 37th Annual News & Documentary Emmy Awards
2016: “Paul Geroudet Award” for “Nature: Animal Homes – Natural Born Engineers: The Nest” at the Festival de Menigoute
2016: “Emmy Nominations” for ‘Nature: Animal Homes,’ “Best Cinematography,” 37th Annual News & Documentary Emmy Awards.
2016: “Emmy Nominations” for ‘Nature: Animal Homes,’ hosted by Chris Morgan “Best Nature Programming,” 37th Annual News & Documentary Emmy Awards.
2016: “Best Broadcast Series” for ‘Nature: Animal Homes,’ at the International Wildlife Film Festival in Missoula, MT
2016: “Gold World Medal” Chris Morgan for ‘Nature: Animal Homes,’ as “Best Host” at the New York Festivals International TV & Film Awards.
2016: “Finalist for Best Short Short” for ‘Why Bears?’ in the “Jackson Hole Wildlife Film Festival. Currently on tour with the “WILD On Tour Initiative”. Sponsored by “Conservation Media Group.”
2015: Screened "Nature: The Last Orangutan Eden" at the Banff Mountain Film Festival
2013: “Nomination” for ‘Hunt for the Russian Tiger,’ (aka Siberian Tiger Quest) hosted by Chris Morgan from Matsalu International Nature Film Festival. (Lihula, Estonia)
2013: Emmy Nomination, ‘Siberian Tiger Quest,’ “Outstanding Nature Programming,” 34th Annual News & Documentary Emmy Awards
2013: “Best Cinematography” for ‘Siberian Tiger Quest,’ from International Wildlife Film Festival, Missoula, MT
2013: “Best Human/Wildlife Interaction” for ‘Siberian Tiger Quest,’ from International Wildlife Film Festival, Missoula, MT
2013: "Best Presenter/Host" for ‘Siberian Tiger Quest,’ from International Wildlife Film Festival, Missoula, MT
2013: “Outstanding Contribution to Wildlife Filmmaking Award” for ‘Hunt for the Russian Tiger,’ (aka Siberian Tiger Quest) hosted by Chris Morgan from the Japan Wildlife Film Festival
2013: “Gold Award” in the Eco-Tourism and Biodiversity category for ‘Hunt for the Russian Tiger,’ (aka Siberian Tiger Quest) hosted by Chris Morgan, from the Deauville Green Award Festival
2013: "Best Presenter/Host" for 'Siberian Tiger Quest' (IWFF)
2012: "Best Presenter/Host" for 'Bears of the Last Frontier: Arctic Wanderers (International Wildlife Film Festival)
2008: Interagency Grizzly Bear Committee Award for Contributions to Grizzly Bear Conservation
2003: 'Outstanding Environmental Educator of the Year' (Environmental Education Association of Washington)

== Books/Publications ==
Bears of the Last Frontier (2011)
Insight Wildlife Management. “Washington Department of Fish and Wildlife. 2010. Cougar Outreach and Education in Washington State.” Washington Department of Fish and Wildlife, Olympia, Washington, USA. 2010.
Promoting understanding: The approach of the North Cascades Grizzly Bear Outreach Project (2004)
Morgan, Chris. “The Andean Bear Research and Environmental Education Project, Ecuador.” Insight Wildlife Management, Inc., Bellingham, Washington, USA. 1999.
The ecology and behavior of female red squirrels (Sciurus vulgarism) during the breeding season in a conifer plantation (1994)
Morgan, Chris. “An Investigation into the Status and Conservation of the Brown Bear (Ursus arctos) in the Cordillera Cantabrica, Spain.” Farnborough College of Technology, Hampshire, United Kingdom, the Cordillera Cantabrica, Spain.” Farnborough College of Technology, Hampshire, United Kingdom, March 1991.
