= Jen Angel =

American activist and writer (1975–2023)

- Born: Jennifer Engel; January 28, 1975; Dearborn, Michigan, U.S.
- Died: February 9, 2023 (aged 48); Oakland, California, U.S.
- Education: Ohio State University (BA)

Jen Angel (January 28, 1975 – February 9, 2023) was an American writer and media activist known for her work on Clamor and Maximum Rock'n'Roll.

== Early life and education ==
Angel was born in Dearborn, Michigan, to John and Pat Engel and started using the last name Angel in high school. She earned a degree in journalism in 1997 from Ohio State University.

== Activism ==
Jen Angel began writing and publishing her personal zine, Fucktooth (1991–2000), while in high school. She continued her media activism through a variety of publications and organizing efforts. From 1996 to 2004, she was a co-editor of Zine Yearbook, a yearly anthology of writing from zines and underground publications. Angel coordinated the publication of Maximum Rocknroll from 1997 to 1998, which led to her temporary relocation from the Midwest to the Bay Area. She co-founded Clamor magazine with Jason Kucsma, for which the Utne Reader profiled them in their 2002 article, "Young Visionaries: 30 under 30." Her writing has been featured in magazines including Bitch, Punk Planet, and In These Times.

In 1999, Angel helped organize the Underground Publishing Conference in Bowling Green, Ohio. Initially called the Midwest Zine Conference, it later became the Allied Media Conference, which continues annually in Detroit. She also founded Agency, an anarchist public relations project, and Aid & Abet, an event management group. She was a core organizer of the Bay Area Anarchist Book Fair, and from 2013 to 2014 she helped organize the Bay Area Radical History Project, which sought to connect newer activists from the Occupy movement with veteran activists from earlier movements.

== Baking ==
Angel moved back to the Bay Area in 2006 and created her company Angel Cakes in 2008. Their retail shop opened in Oakland in March 2016. The shop offered 120 flavors of cupcakes and donated money and provided desserts for social justice efforts such as environmental justice, housing, and criminal justice reform.

== Death ==
Angel was robbed in a bank parking lot on February 6, 2023, and then critically injured as a result. She chased after the getaway car, but got caught in the vehicle's door and was dragged more than 50 feet, smashing her head on the sidewalk. She was put in a medically induced coma and later declared dead on February 9, 2023. In a statement, Angel's friends wrote that Angel "...did not believe in state violence, carceral punishment, or incarceration as an effective or just solution to social violence and inequity," and they have expressed a commitment to pursuing restorative justice approaches in response to her death.

A suspect in her murder, Ishmael Jenkins Burch, was arrested in June 2023.

== Legacy ==
In August 2023, the Institute for Anarchist Studies and anarchist group Agency announced the creation of the Jen Angel Anarchist Media Grant. Her papers are held by Ohio State University's Rare Books & Manuscripts Library.
