= Tear of a Doll =

French musical group

Tear of a Doll, previously called Tears of a Doll (also known as T.O.D.), is a musical group from Paris, France. Starting as a hardcore punk band, they later blended the speed and energy of that style with more complex structures inherited from the experiments of 1970s progressive rock, 1990s noise rock or math rock and even non-western traditional music. Tear of a Doll features female vocals in various languages (mainly English, but also Japanese, German, French and Hungarian).

== Biography ==
=== Early history 1988-1992 ===
Tears of a Doll was formed in October 1988 by the three remaining members of the hardcore band Heimat-los, which had split upon the departure of its fourth member, having been active since 1983.

Their name was chosen as opposite of the typical Hardcore punk band names, and also in reference to a style of Hardcore that had originated in Washington, D.C. and that would be later called "emo".

=== Later history 1992-... ===
After they lost their original singer (Norbert from Heimat-los) and their second guitarist (Nydeu, ex. Kromozom 4) and got a new drummer (the third one), they took the opportunity to radically change their sound. From then on they created a new repertoire showing obvious influences of Victims Family and NoMeansNo but with a very personal touch. Astrid Orion (female vocalist) joined the band around that time.

The most representative recording of Tear of a Doll is a full-length untitled album recorded in 1996 on which wild hardcore punk songs are interspersed with more experimental songs that some would label avant-garde rock.

Since the end of 1996 guitarist and founding member François L'H. has spent more time expatriated in Asia than in France. During this time the band has been almost inactive, only playing at Trans-Musicales (1997), a festival in Rennes, France and occasionally releasing a few songs on compilations.

== Discography ==
=== With Norbert on vocals (up to 1992) ===
- Ca y est t'es réveillé? cassette (2nd demo tape), 1990
- Various artists "Euro punk domain" LP, Black Hand (Czech Republic), 1991
- Various artists "Don't forget the punks of Bangkok" 12"EP (USA) 1991
- Tears of a Doll" (untilted) EP, Alternativnoise (France), 1991
- Various artists "Art primitif", On a faim (France)

=== With Astrid Orion on vocals (from 1992 on) ===
- La fille aux allumettes cassette, 1993
- Une araignée dans le plafond cassette, 1994
- Tear of a Doll (untilted) CD, Pandemonium & Dodoll (France), 1996
- Various artists La colère Angrrr (France), 1997
- Various artists Bars en trans 97", 1997
- Various artists 5 years of Pandemonium", Pandemonium (France),1998
- Various artists Allez les filles!", Rock Hardi
- "Erase-yer-head No. 9" split EP with Melt Banana, God is My Co-Pilot & Camp Blackfoot, Pandemonium, 1999
- Various artists International Punk Boxset" (10 CD in a metal box), Canada, 2002
- Various artists Une autre vision des choses" (Re)Aktion (France)
- Various artists Hangover heartattack (a tribute to Poison Idea)", Farewell, Network of Friends (Germany) & Ataque Sonoro (Portugal), 2003
