= Radical Jesus =

Graphic novel by Paul Buhle

Radical Jesus: A Graphic History of Faith is a graphic novel edited by Paul Buhle and illustrated by Sabrina Jones, Gary Dumm, and Nick Thorkelson.

== Background ==
Buhle was a part of the Congregational church until the age of 15 when he started going to a Christian Youth Fellowship. He later left the church and became interested in liberation theology. His experiences with religion inspired him to write the book. The book was published the same year as the 2013 papal conclave when Pope Francis was elected to the position and began expressing concerns about capitalism. The book's intended audience is anyone between the age of 15 and 30 who may not have much of a religious background.

== Plot ==
The book is split into three sections. The first is called "Radical Gospel" and is illustrated by Jones. The section is set during the Gospels, but contrasts Jesus and his disciples with people in modern day attire. The second covers the events from the 14th to 19th centuries and is illustrated by Dumm. For instance, the section includes stories of the 14th Lollards and a peace treaty between the Quakers and Lenape people. The final section is illustrated by Thorkelson and is set in modern times.

== Reception ==
Jim Cullen wrote in the History News Network that the book "is a rich and striking social document". Drew G. I. Hart commented in The Christian Century that the transition between art styles from black and white to color works well and compliments the writing. Neil Derksen criticised the book in the Library Journal saying that the book had a "lack of cohesion, both narratively and artistically". Dissent Magazine compared and contrasted the book to Zealot: The Life and Times of Jesus of Nazareth and Killing Jesus: A History.
