= Shit House Poet =

Comic book feature

Cover from episode entitled "Partners Three", appeared in World War 3 Illustrated

Shit House Poet (Sometimes referred to as "The Shit House Poet Stories") is the creation of writer and comic book artist Sandy Jimenez. Featured in World War 3 Illustrated consistently throughout the 1990s, these stories chronicle the lives of a nameless narrator and his friends in New York city.

== Storylines and themes ==
The stories range from the Geo-political (often following the theme of a particular World War 3 Illustrated issue in which they appear), to the intensely personal in scope. The very first episode debuted in issue #14 of World War 3 Illustrated, a special issue of comic book stories devoted to the first Iraq war in 1991. The episodes are marked by a "testimonial" style, and are always narrated in first person as if they were actual recollections of events. In 2010 Shit House Poet will mark its 20th year of publication in World War 3 Illustrated.

== Art & Style ==
The Shit House Poet stories are distinguished by their visual influences: late 1970s graffiti and street art aesthetics, particularly the aerosol murals on New York City's subway trains in the period. Exclusively in black and white since its 1991 debut, the comic strip utilizes graffiti-inspired splash pages for its episode titles and covers as well as “graf-style” lettering. The stories take place across the life of a nameless Hispanic/Latino-American narrator in the South Bronx. The narratives stretch across the lives of the individual characters and throughout different time periods. Some stories take place in their early childhood, (e.g. “Skips,” “Partners Four”) some take place contemporaneously (“Partner’s 5ive,”) and still others move in and out of time (“Robert Is Superman.”)

== In Other Media ==
In 2005, filmmaker Steve Curley adapted the Shit House Poet story “Skips” into a live action motion picture that was an official selection at the Tribeca Film Festival in New York City and screened as part of the Beyond Manhattan exposition at the festival's end.

== Public exhibitions ==
The Shit House Poet story entitled "The HereAfter" about the events and political climate surrounding the 9/11 attacks, ran in issue # 32 and was also presented in its entirety in the Exit Art show Reactions. Material from "The Shit House Poet" episodes "Skips", "Partners 5ive" and "The HereAfter" were exhibited as part of the University of Wisconsin at Milwaukee Library sponsored Zine Fest from July 18–20, 2008 as part of their selection for the Special Collections archive at UWM's Golda Meir Library.
