= Isabella Bannerman =

American cartoonist (born 1961)

Isabella Bannerman (born 1961 in Buffalo, New York) is an American cartoonist known for her role as one of the contributors to the syndicated comic strip Six Chix (where she provides the Monday panel).

Bannerman's cartooning career began in 1987, when she won a cartoon contest in the San Francisco Bay Guardian.

Bannerman was co-editor (along with Ann Decker and Sabrina Jones) of GirlTalk, a four-issue comics anthology of women's autobiographical comics published by Fantagraphics in 1995–1996. In 1997, GirlTalk was nominated for "Lulu of the Year" by Friends of Lulu (losing out to The Great Women Superheroes, by Trina Robbins).

She has also worked in the television industry, as an animator on Doug.

== Awards ==
In 2012, Bannerman won the Union of Concerned Scientists' editorial cartoon contest.

In 2014, she won the National Cartoonists Society Divisional Award for Best Newspaper Comic Strip.
