= Sabrina Jones =

American painter and comic book artist, writer, illustrator, and editor

- Born: 1960 (age 65–66)

Sabrina Jones (born on October 6, 1960, in Philadelphia, Pennsylvania) is an American painter and comic book artist, writer, illustrator, and editor. In addition to her own graphic novels, she is associated with artist/activist collectives such as Carnival Knowledge and underground comics such as GirlTalk and World War 3 Illustrated.

== Biography ==
Born and raised in Philadelphia, Jones moved to New York City to study painting at Pratt Institute. She began writing and illustrating comics in the 1980s, inspired by the societal tumult of the Reagan era and the revived conservative focus on repealing abortion and other reproductive rights. She joined a group of pro-choice activist artists called Carnival Knowledge. World War 3 Illustrated co-founder Seth Tobocman convinced Jones to create her first comic strip for the magazine. She went on to edit and contribute to many issues of World War 3 Illustrated, including "Bitchcraft," "Female Complaints," and "Life During Wartime."

In the mid-1990s Jones co-founded (with Isabella Bannerman and Ann Decker) Girltalk, a four-issue comics anthology of women's autobiographical comics published by Fantagraphics. In 1997, GirlTalk was nominated for "Lulu of the Year" by Friends of Lulu (losing out to The Great Women Superheroes, by Trina Robbins).

In 2002, Jones' work was included in the exhibition "She Draws Comics: Trina Robbins and 27 Women Cartoonists", curated by Trina Robbins, shown at the Secession Gallery, Vienna, Austria; the exhibition toured to the Museum of Comic and Cartoon Art (New York City) in 2006.

Jones created her first historical comics for Wobblies! A Graphic History of the Industrial Workers of the World, published by Verso Books in 2005. Her work on The Real Cost of Prisons Comix inspired her to create Mixed Signals, a counter-recruitment tool in comic book form. Her first long-form graphic novel was Isadora Duncan: a Graphic Biography, published in 2008 by Hill & Wang.

2010 saw one of Jones' first collaborations with a writer — Paul Buhle. Buhle wrote the text for FDR and the New Deal for Beginners, which was illustrated entirely by Jones. The mixture of a graphic novel and a history book by Buhle and Jones was the latest in the long line of For Beginners books. Jones' artwork was noted by one reviewer for its "thick, darkened contours . . . – like film noir invaded by grainy newsreel footage in a Brechtian landscape."

In 2013 Jones wrote and drew Race to Incarcerate: A Graphic Retelling, an adaptation of Marc Mauer's book on America's exploding imprisonment rate.

In 2016, Soft Skull Press published Jones' graphic novel Our Lady of Birth Control: A Cartoonist's Encounter with Margaret Sanger, which told Sanger's biography through the lens of Jones' own experiences during the sexual revolution.

In addition to being a fine art painter, Jones has worked consistently as a scenic artist since 1990, painting scenery for film, theater, and television. In 1994, as a new member of United Scenic Artists Local 829 Jones began weekly work for Saturday Night Live's broadcasts, a practice that continues to this day.

Jones was awarded MacDowell residences in 1995, 1997, and 2004. She completed an MFA from the School of Visual Arts in New York City in 2003.

== Personal life ==
Jones lives in Brooklyn, New York.

== Bibliography ==
=== Solo projects ===
- Mixed Signals (self-published one-shot, 2006)
- Isadora Duncan: a Graphic Biography (Hill & Wang, 2008) ISBN 978-0809094974
- Race to Incarcerate: A Graphic Retelling (The New Press, 2013) ISBN 978-1595585417 — adaptation of Marc Mauer's book
- Our Lady of Birth Control: A Cartoonist's Encounter with Margaret Sanger (Soft Skull Press, 2016) ISBN 978-1593766405

=== Anthologies ===
- World War 3 Illustrated (many issues, 1984–2004) — regular contributor, occasional editor
- Real Girl #4 (Fantagraphics, Sept. 1992) — contributor; edited by Angela Bocage
- GirlTalk (4 issues, Fantagraphics, 1995–1996) — co-editor and contributor
- Wobblies! A Graphic History of the Industrial Workers of the World (Verso Books, 2005) ISBN 978-1844675258 — contributing cartoonist; edited by Paul Buhle and Nicole Schulman
- Nature Comics #3 (Nature, 2008) — contributed the story "Good Wolf / Bad Wolf"
- The Real Cost of Prisons Comix (PM Press, 2008) ISBN 9781604860344 — contributed the story "Prisoners of the War on Drugs"

=== Illustrator ===
- FDR for Beginners (For Beginners, 2010) ISBN 978-1934389508 — with writer Paul Buhle
- Radical Jesus: A Graphic History of Faith (Herald Press, 2013) ISBN 978-0836196214 — illustrated the cover as well as the section "Radical Gospel;" with writer Paul Buhle
