= Sandy Jimenez =

American comics creator

- Sandy Jimenez, at work in May 2007.
- Born: Sandy Rafael Jimenez; March 8, 1968 (age 58) Manhattan, New York
- Areas: Creator, writer, illustrator,filmmaker
- Notable works: The 12th Sister; Marley Davidson; Shit House Poet; Urban Scrimmage; The Likes of Us, Kissed, Hiccup

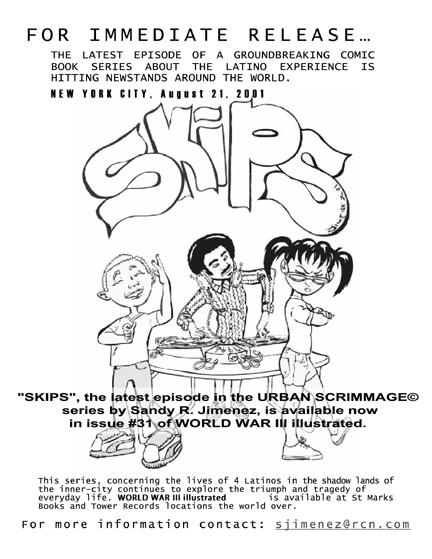
Press release featuring cover from "Skips" episode, appeared in World War 3 Illustrated #31 (2001)

Sandy Jimenez (born March 8, 1968) is an American comic book artist, writer and director, most commonly associated with the New York city independent comic book scene of the 1990s, with work appearing in magazines such as Inner City Press and World War 3 Illustrated.

== Biography ==
Jimenez was born in Manhattan and raised by a single mother in the South Bronx during the 1970s, the years of the borough's most intense economic privation and grinding poverty. Displaying an aptitude for visual art and creative writing from a very early age, he was awarded a scholarship to the Calhoun School in fall 1980. He majored in sculpture at The Cooper Union and exhibited four completed comic books in 1990 as part of his senior exhibition in the Houghton Gallery. One of the comic books shown at the exhibition, Shit House Poet, was the basis of his ongoing published work in World War 3 Illustrated for the entire decade and beyond.

In 2004, the comic book story entitled "Skips", originally published in issue #31 of World War 3 Illustrated, was adapted into a short film that was part of the official competition at the Tribeca Film Festival. Jimenez received the ABC/Disney New Talent Development Grant in the same year for his screenplay writing.

Jimenez began collaborating with the writer Jon Papernick in 2007 to adapt his book, Who by Fire, Who by Blood, into a graphic novel.

His comic book work continues to be reviewed favorably, and his series Shit House Poet still appears regularly in World War 3 Illustrated. In 2007, he directed The Likes of Us, his first full-length feature film and became the CEO of 700 Shades of Grey Inc.

== Reviews ==
- Holland Cotter (February 1, 2002). "ART REVIEW; Amid the Ashes, Creativity". The New York Times.
- "Correctives & Propaganda: World War III Illustrated #41 and Borderland" A review by Rob Clough in The Comics Journal reviewing work that appeared in World War 3 Illustrated issue number 41 in 2011.
