= Clamor (magazine) =

American magazine

- Founder: Jen Angel and Jason Kucsma
- First issue: November 1999
- Final issue Number: December 2006; 38
- Country: United States
- Based in: Toledo, Ohio
- Language: English
- Website: clamormagazine.org
- ISSN: 1534-9489

Clamor was a bi-monthly magazine published in Toledo, Ohio, and founded by Jen Angel and Jason Kucsma. The focus of the magazine was alternative culture (covering art, commentary, cultural criticism, photography, interviews, politics, and music), often from a politically left-wing perspective.

Clamor magazine hosted the Midwest Zine Conference which later became Allied Media Projects and the Allied Media Conference. It was reported in November 2006 that Clamor intended to go out of business. According to New York City Indymedia, Clamor published over 1000 writers and artists in its seven-year, 38-issue run.
