= Peter Kuper =

American alternative comics artist and illustrator

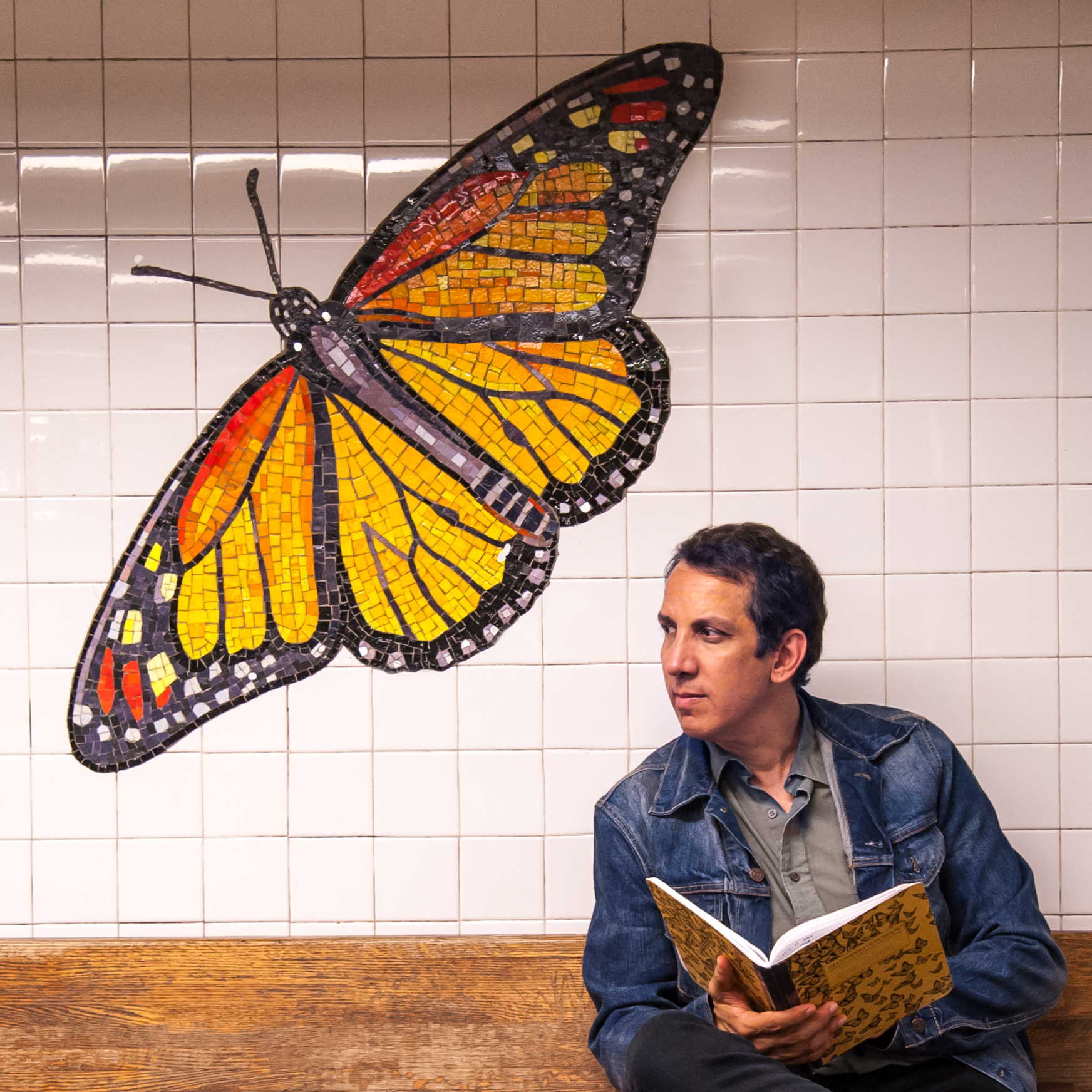
- Peter Kuper in 2014
- Born: September 22, 1958 (age 68) Summit, New Jersey
- Areas: Artist, writer
- Notable works: World War 3 Illustrated; Spy vs. Spy; The System; Give It Up! The Metamorphosis
- Awards: Society of Illustrators gold medal, 2004, silver medal 2009, gold medal 2010

Peter Kuper (/ˈkuːpər/; born September 22, 1958) is an American alternative comics artist and illustrator, best known for his autobiographical, political, and social observations.

Besides his contributions to the political anthology World War 3 Illustrated, which he co-founded in 1979 with Seth Tobocman, Kuper is best known for taking over Spy vs. Spy for Mad magazine, which he both wrote and drew from 1997 to 2022. Kuper has produced numerous graphic novels which have been translated into French, German, Spanish, Italian, Portuguese, Swedish, Slovenian and Greek, including award-winning adaptations of Franz Kafka's Give It Up! and the Metamorphosis.

== Early life ==
Peter Kuper was born in Summit, New Jersey, and moved to Cleveland, Ohio when he was six years old, where he graduated from Cleveland Heights High School in 1976. He lived in Israel with his parents in 1969–70.

In 1970 Kuper and his childhood friend Seth Tobocman published their first fanzine, Phanzine, and in 1971 they published G.A.S Lite, the official magazine of the Cleveland Graphic Arts Society. In 1972 Kuper traded R. Crumb some old jazz records for the right to publish some artwork from one of Crumb's sketchbooks in a comic titled Melotoons that lasted for two issues.

He attended Kent State University in 1976–1977, then moved to New York City in 1977, where he studied at Art Students League and the Pratt Institute (along with Seth Tobocman). For a short period he acted as studio assistant for cartoonist Howard Chaykin at Chaykin's shared studio space, Upstart Associates.

== Career ==
=== Comics ===
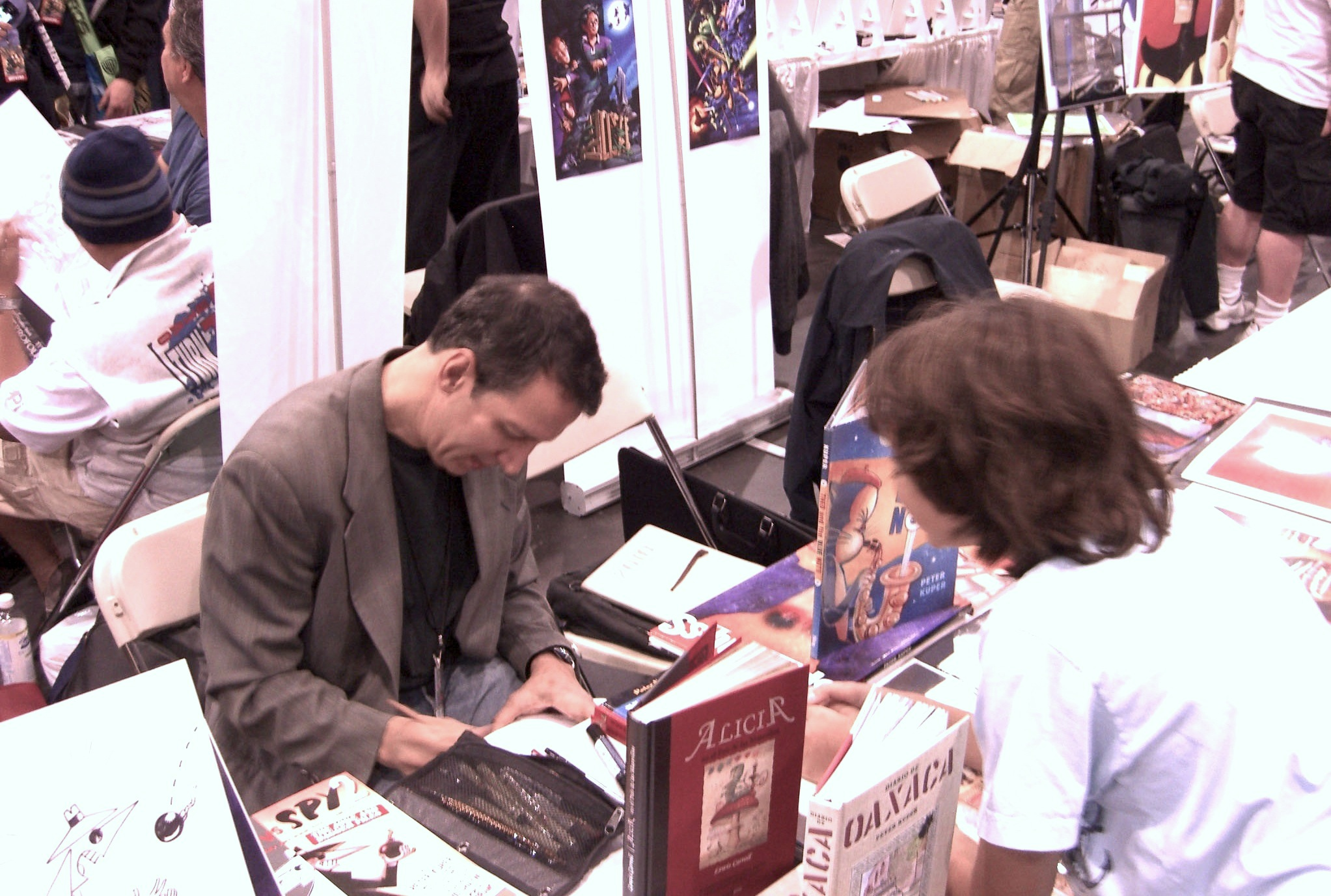
Kuper sketching at the New York Comic Con, October 10, 2010.

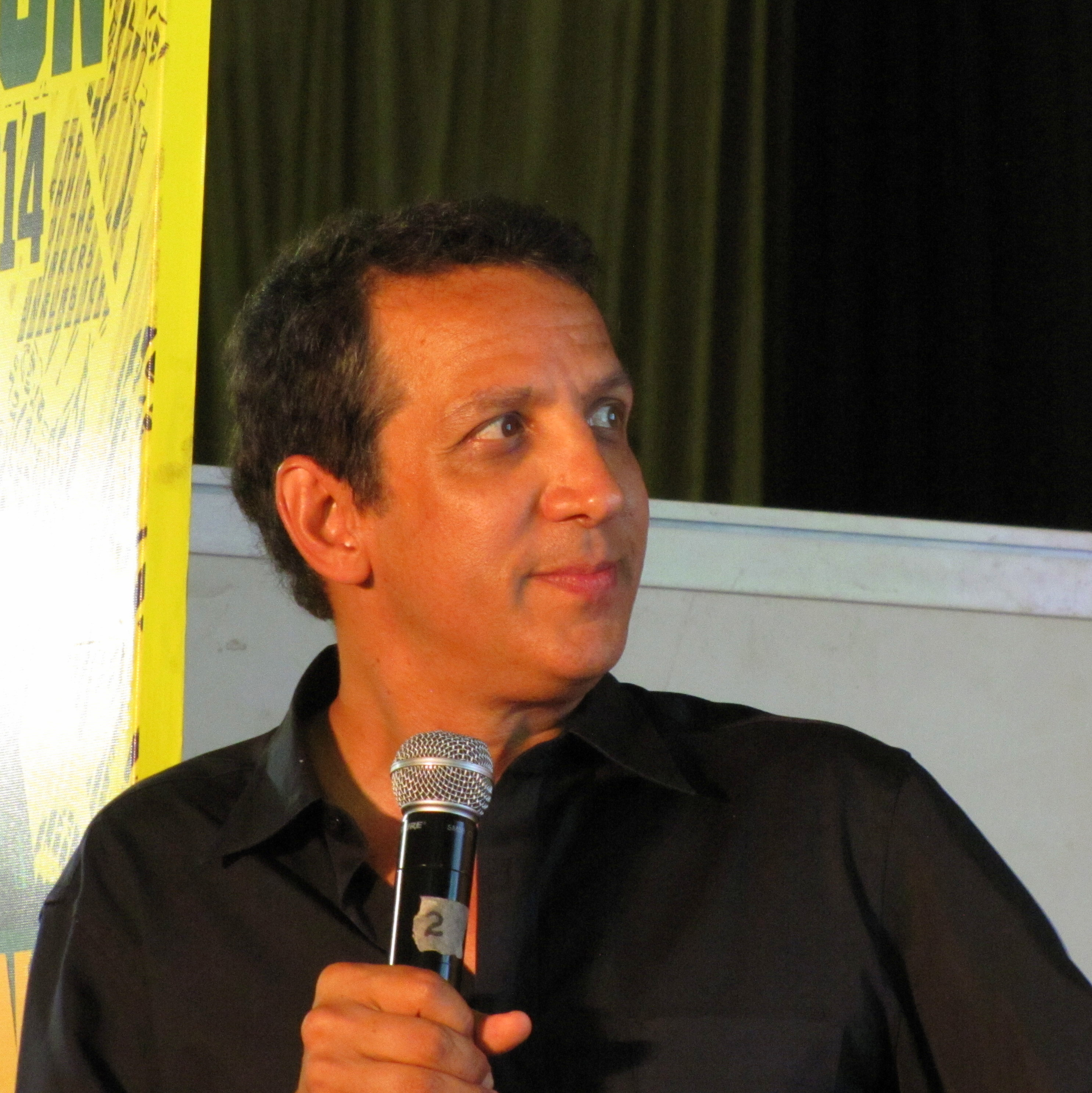
Kuper at Bangalore Comic Con, September 14, 2014

Kuper, Tobocman, and painter Christof Kohlhofer founded World War 3 Illustrated in 1979.

Kuper has travelled extensively through Latin America, Europe, Africa, the Middle East and Southeast Asia, much of which he documented in his 1992 book, ComicsTrips: A Journal of Travels Through Africa and Southeast Asia.

Spy vs. Spy had passed through various hands after its creator Antonio Prohías retired, but Kuper's version has appeared without interruption since 1997, although the last new edition was published in 2022.

Kuper's Eye of the Beholder was the first comic strip to ever regularly appear in the New York Times, and his quasi-autobiography Stop Forgetting To Remember: The Autobiography of Walter Kurtz covers the birth of his daughter, 9/11, and other vicissitudes in his life from 1995 to 2005.

Though permanently based in New York City, Kuper resided in the Mexican state of Oaxaca with his wife and daughter from 2006–2008, where he documented an ongoing teachers' strike and other aspects of Mexico in his sketchbook journal Diario de Oaxaca.

Kuper's work in comics and illustration frequently combines techniques from both disciplines and often takes the form of wordless comic strips. Kuper remarked on this, "I initially put comics on one side and my illustration in another compartment, but over the years I found that it was difficult to compartmentalize like that. The two have merged together so that they're really inseparable."

Kuper has taught comics and illustration courses at the Parsons School of Design, and The School of Visual Arts and Harvard University’s first class dedicated to graphic novels.

In April 2022, Kuper was reported among the more than three dozen comics creators who contributed to Operation USA's benefit anthology book, Comics for Ukraine: Sunflower Seeds, a project spearheaded by IDW Publishing Special Projects Editor Scott Dunbier, whose profits would be donated to relief efforts for Ukrainian refugees resulting from the February 2022 Russian invasion of Ukraine. Kuper contributed political cartoons to the anthology.

=== Illustration ===
As an illustrator, Kuper has produced covers for Time, Newsweek, Businessweek and The Progressive. He has done hundreds of illustrations for newspapers including The New York Times and for magazines such as Rolling Stone, Entertainment Weekly, and The New Yorker. Kuper has been co-art director of the political illustration group INX International Ink Company since 1988.

== Awards ==
Kuper won a journalism award from The Society of Newspaper Designers in 2001. His wordless picture story Sticks and Stones was awarded the 2004 gold medal, and his comic "This Is Not A Comic" won a silver medal in 2009 both from the Society of Illustrators. He won another gold medal in the sequential arts category from the Society of Illustrators in 2010. His book Sticks and Stones, The System, Diario de Oaxaca, Ruins won the 2016 Eisner Award and adaptations of many of Franz Kafka’s works into comics including The Metamorphosis and Kafkaesque won the 2018 NCS award.

== Bibliography ==
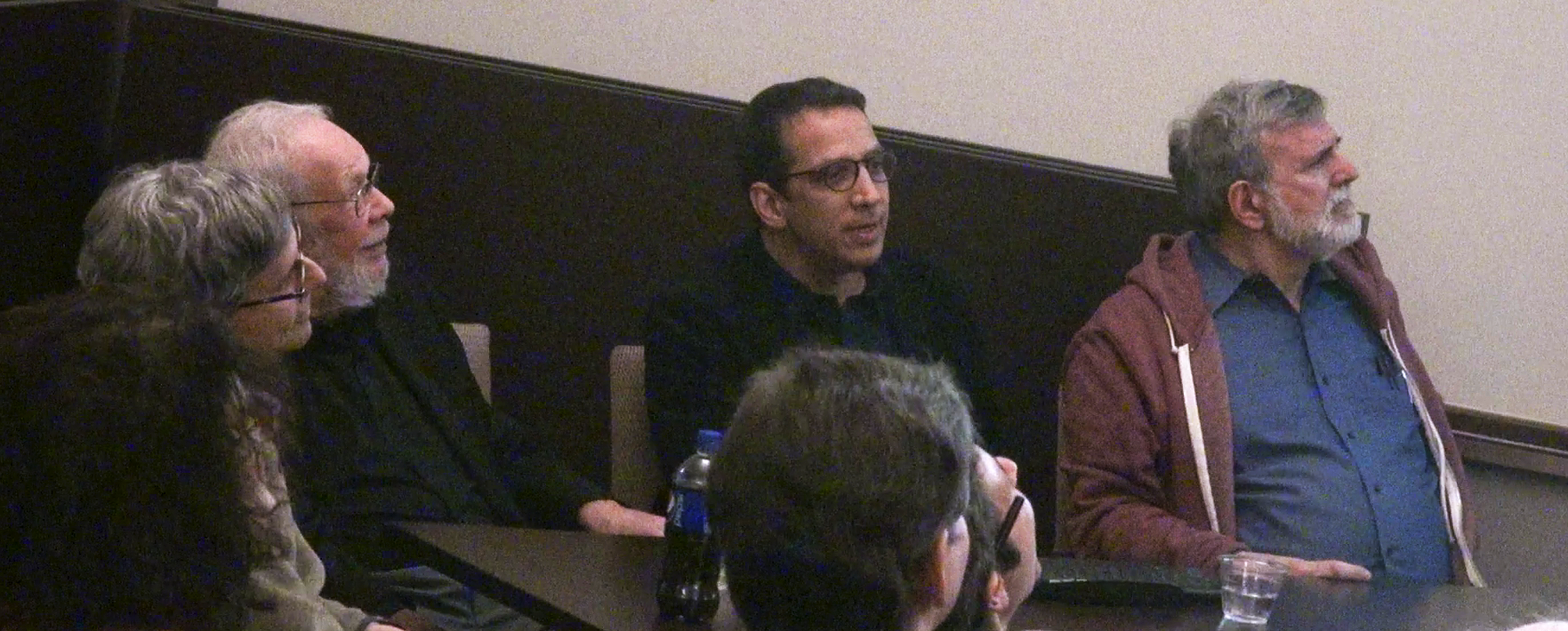
Al Jaffee, Peter Kuper, and Sam Viviano, and Paul Levitz at a panel at Columbia University in early 2014

Comics work includes:

- 1984 – The Last Cat Book, illustrating an essay by Robert E.Howard, soft-bound (Dodd Mead)
- 1987 – New York City, collection of author's comics, soft-bound (Fantagraphics)
- 1988 – Life and Death, collection of author's comics, magazine format (Fantagraphics)
- 1989 – World War 3 Illustrated, co-editor of anthology (Fantagraphics)
- 1991 – The Jungle, comics adaptation of Upton Sinclair's novel (First Comics' Classics Illustrated; reissues in hardcover by NBM in 2004 and again in 2010)
- 1991–1993 – Bleeding Heart, comics by the author, comic format, five issues (Fantagraphics)
- 1992 – ComicsTrips: A Journal of Travels Through Africa and Southeast Asia, travel-related comics by the author (Tundra and then re-issued by NBM)
- 1993–1994 – Wild Life, comics by the author, comic format, two issues (Fantagraphics)
- 1995 – Stripped, An Unauthorized Autobiography, softbound (Fantagraphics)
- 1995 – Give It Up!, graphic adaptations of nine of Franz Kafka's short stories (NBM)
- 1995 – World War 3: Confrontational Comics, co-editor of anthology (Four Walls Eight Windows)
- 1996 – Eye of the Beholder, a collection of syndicated strips, softbound (NBM)
- 1997 – The System, (collected as a single book) softbound, (DC/Vertigo)
- 2000 – Topsy Turvy, a collection of political comic strips, trade paperback (Eye Press)
- 2000 – Mind's Eye, a collection of syndicated strips, hardcover, (NBM)
- 2001 – Speechless, a retrospective collection, hardcover (Top Shelf Productions)
- 2003 – The Metamorphosis, an adaptation of Franz Kafka's short story (Crown)
- 2004 – Sticks and Stones, a novel in pictures (Three Rivers Press)
- 2006 – Theo and the Blue Note, children's book (Viking)
- 2007 — Le Sketch #04 (Le Sketch), minicomic with sketches
- 2007 – Stop Forgetting To Remember: The Autobiography of Walter Kurtz, quasi-autobiographical graphic novel about author's alter ego (Crown)
- 2009 – Diario De Oaxaca : A Sketchbook Journal of Two Years in Mexico (PM Press/Sexto Piso)
- 2010 – Alicia en el País de las Maravillas, illustrated Spanish edition of Lewis Carroll's Alice in Wonderland (Sexto Piso)
- 2013 – Tercer ojo, collected Spanish edition of Mind's Eye (Editorial Robot)
- 2015 – Ruins, a graphic novel (SelfMadeHero)
- 2018 – Kafkaesque, graphic adaptations of fourteen of Franz Kafka's short stories (W. W. Norton)
- 2019 – Heart of Darkness, graphic adaptation of Joseph Conrad's classic novella (W. W. Norton)
- 2025 - Insectopolis: A Natural History, graphic nonfiction about insects and entomologists (W. W. Norton)
