= Seth Tobocman =

American radical comic book creator

- Born: 1958 (age 67–68)
- Areas: Writer, Artist
- Notable works: World War 3 Illustrated

Seth Tobocman (born 1958) is a radical comic book artist who has resided in Manhattan's Lower East Side since 1978. Tobocman is best known for his creation of the political comic book anthology World War 3 Illustrated, which he started in 1979 with fellow artist Peter Kuper. Throughout his career, he has played a significant role as a propagandist for various movements in the United States, including squatting, anti-globalization, and anti-war causes. Tobocman's "Edith In Flames. World War 3 Illustrated #45" was listed under "Notable Comics" in The Best American Comics 2015.

== Biography ==
Tobocman was raised in Cleveland Heights, Ohio, where his father worked as a physics professor at Case Western Reserve University. He grew up reading superhero comics, and his biggest influences, from a storytelling standpoint, were Jack Kirby and Steve Ditko.

Tobocman graduated from Cleveland Heights High School. In 1970, Tobocman and his childhood friend Peter Kuper published their first fanzine, Phanzine, and in 1971, they published G.A.S Lite, the official magazine of the Cleveland Graphic Arts Society. Moving to New York City, he studied at the Pratt Institute (along with Kuper).

Tobocman created an animation for filmmaker Antonino D'Ambrosio's Let Fury Have the Hour (2012), which chronicles the movement of world citizenship.

Tobocman is a member of the radical avant-garde anti-art movement NO!art.

== Published work ==
- Len (a Lawyer in History): A Graphic Biography of Radical Attorney Leonard Weinglass (AK Press, 2016) ISBN 9781849352406
- Understanding the Crash with Eric Larsen and Jessica Wehrle (Soft Skull Press, 2010)
- Disaster and Resistance: Comics and Landscapes for the 21st Century (AK PRESS, 2008)
- Portraits of Israelis and Palestinians For My Parents (Soft Skull Press, 2003)
- War in the Neighborhood (Autonomedia, 2000) ISBN 978-1-57027-054-3
- Freedom of the Press in Black and White: The Story of Mumia Abu-Jamal, a Black Reporter (S. Chicago ARA-ABC Zine Distro, 1999)
- You Don't Have to Fuck People Over to Survive (Pressure Drop Press, 1990) ISBN 9780962709104

=== Contributions ===
- The Graphic Canon Volume 2: From "Kubla Khan" to the Brontë Sisters to The Picture of Dorian Gray (Seven Stories Press, 2012) — illustrations for Frederick Douglass's "The Message from Mount Misery"
- Three Cities Against the Wall: Palestinian, Israeli And American Artists Protest in Three Cities (Vox Pop, 2006) ISBN 978-0-9752763-5-8
- Katamine's Forest of Bobo (2006) — concept album, telling the life story of Bobo the bear; each song is accompanied by a drawing in the CD booklet, painted by Tobocman
- World War 3 Illustrated 1980-1988 (AK Press, 1989) ISBN 978-1-56097-002-6
