= Horjak =

Horjak is a surname. Notable people with the surname include:

- Branko Horjak (born 1950), Yugoslav footballer and manager
- Cédric Horjak (born 1979), French footballer
- Ciril Horjak (born 1975), Slovene comic book artist and book and newspaper illustrator
