= Gianluca Costantini =

Italian cartoonist, artist, Comic journalist, and activist

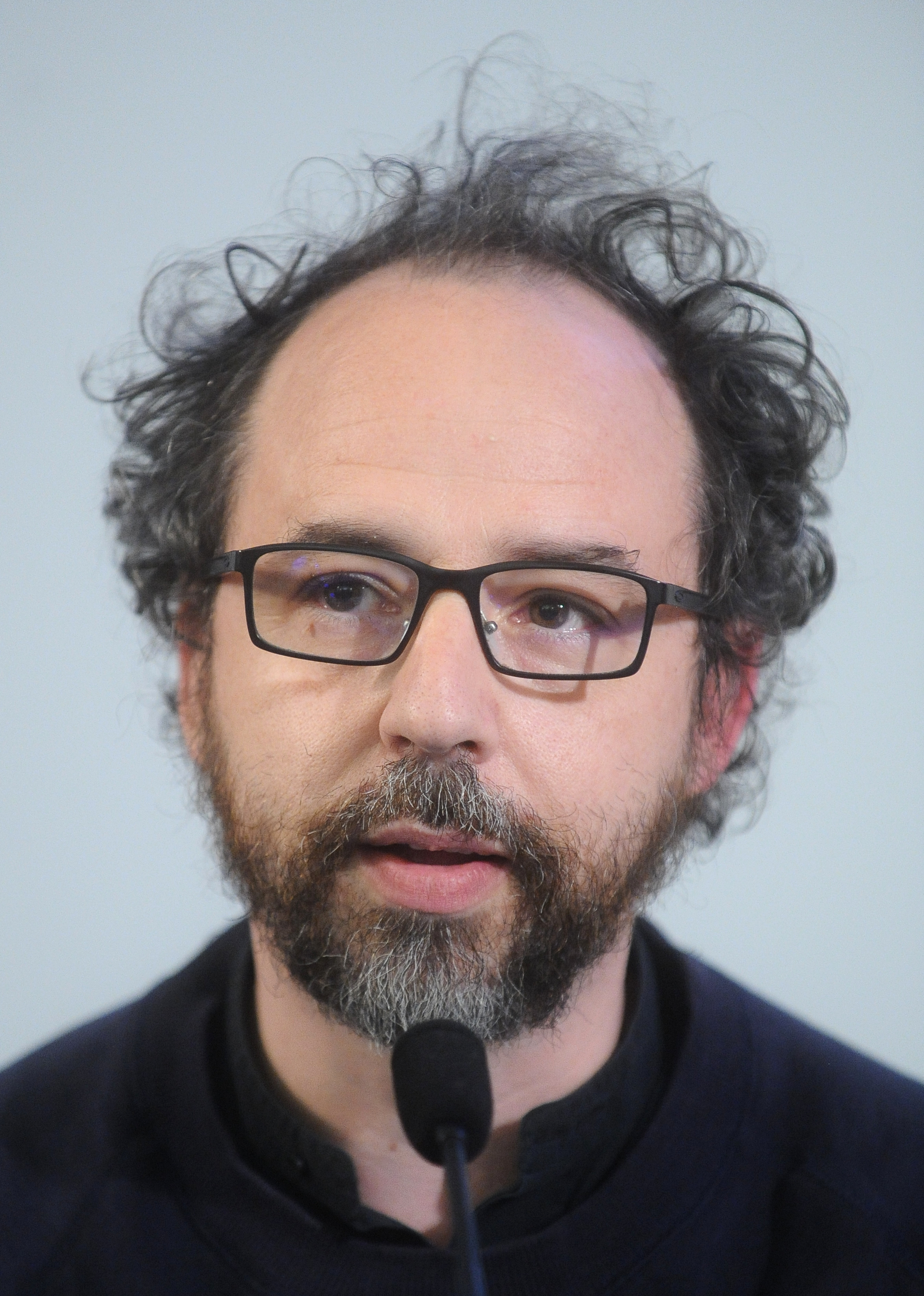
- Born: December 19, 1971 (age 54) Ravenna, Italy
- Areas: Comics artist, cartoonist, Comics journalism, activist
- Pseudonym: Channeldraw
- Notable works: Libia; Fedele alla linea L'ammaestratore di Istanbul; Julian Assange dall'etica hacker a Wikileaks
- Spouse: Elettra Stamboulis (m. 2001)

Gianluca Costantini (born December 19, 1971) is a cartoonist, artist, comic journalist, and activist from Ravenna, Italy.

== Biography ==
Costantini is an Italian illustrator and cartoonist who received his training at the Academy of Fine Arts in Ravenna. His career took off in 1993 when he contributed to the publications Schizzo in Cremona and the newspaper Il Manifesto. Starting from the year 2000, he embarked on experimenting with the use of the web in the language of comics through the project inguine.net, which later gave rise to the publication of the magazine inguineMAH!gazine by Coniglio Editore. In 2002, he curated the exhibition of Joe Sacco in Italy, followed in 2003 by the exhibition of Marjane Satrapi. In 2005, alongside Elettra Stamboulis, he organized the Komikazen Festival of real-life comics, an event that he continued to organize until 2016.

Since 2010, Costantini has taught Comic Art in the two-year specialization in Comic Languages at the Academy of Fine Arts in Bologna. From 2016 to 2020, he actively participated in the activities of DiEM25 (Democracy in Europe Movement 2025), the movement led by Yanis Varoufakis, and collaborated with the Chinese Artist Ai Weiwei.

He exhibited at the Lazarides Gallery in London in 2009, then at the Salon du dessin contemporain and at the Carousel du Louvre in Paris in 2010. In 2014 he exhibited at Dox Centre for the Contemporary Art of Prague and at the Humor Graphic Museum of Diogenes Taborda in Buenos Aires. In Italy he exhibited alongside the works of Alighiero Boetti at the Museum of Contemporary Art in Lissone in 2013.

== Drawings for Human Rights ==
Since 2004, Costantini has distinguished himself for his dedication to illustrating globally resonant political and social events. His artistic career began with collaboration on the Indymedia portal, focusing on significant political events such as street protests and revolutions that have characterized the global landscape. Among his most notable works are drawings dedicated to the Egyptian Revolution of 2011 in Cairo, the Occupy Gezi protest in Istanbul in 2013, as well as the Hong Kong protest of 2019 and 2020.

Since 2014, Costantini has focused his artistic talent on human rights, with a particular emphasis on the conditions of detainees in places such as Bahrain, Saudi Arabia, China, Turkey and Egypt. In 2018, he followed and captured with his drawings the massacre at the editorial office of the Capital Gazette newspaper in Annapolis, Maryland.

In 2019, he collaborated with Pen International, creating a series of drawings aimed at raising public awareness about human rights issues in Eritrea. His artistic endeavors intertwine with major international human rights organizations, including Amnesty International, ActionAid, SOS Mediterranée and Arci.

The recognition of his artistic contribution was emphasized in 2019 when he received the "Art and Human Rights" award from Amnesty International. In 2023, Costantini further solidified his commitment to human rights through the publication of the book "Human Rights Portraits". This work was presented on the occasion of the sixtieth anniversary of Amnesty International and includes in-depth texts curated by Riccardo Noury. The book represents a significant contribution to documenting human stories and the challenges faced in the struggle for human rights.

=== The Patrick Zaki Case ===
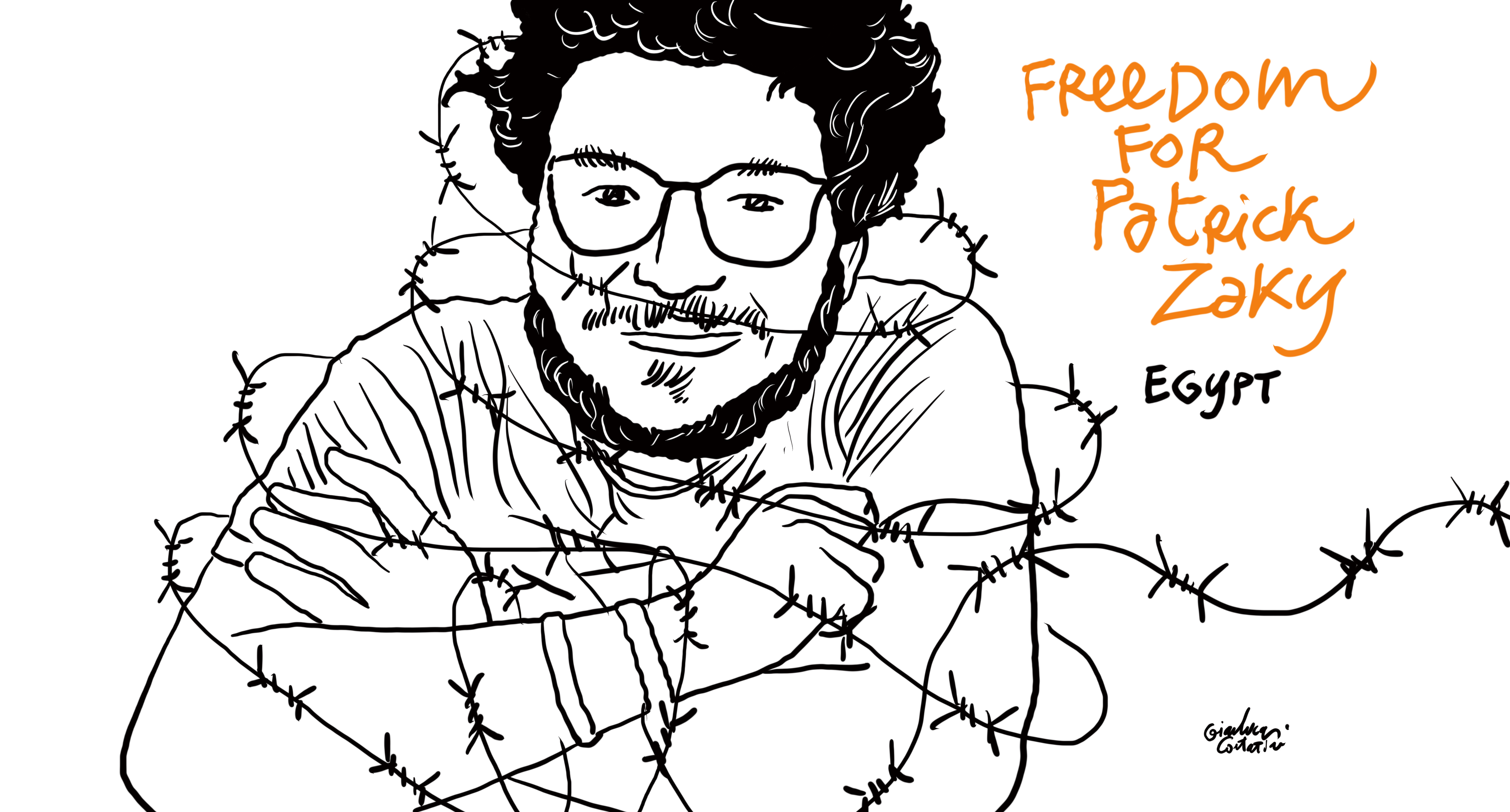
The portrait created by the artist Gianluca Costantini on 7 February 2020

Costantini was the creator of the iconic image associated with the Patrick Zaki case, with the drawing being published on February 7, 2002, the day of Zaki's arrest. For two years, the drawing was utilized as part of Amnesty International's liberation campaign and was featured in large installations across Italian cities. In May 2020, Mayor Virginio Merola of Bologna had reproduction of the drawing installed in Piazza Maggiore. In the same month, a significant installation at the Archiginnasio Library was commissioned by the University of Bologna. In 2022, Costantini published a graphic novel written by Laura Cappon, titled "Patrick Zaki, una storia egiziana," released by Feltrinelli Editore.

=== The accusation of terrorism by the Turkish government ===
In July 2016, following the failed coup attempt in Turkey, Costantini was initially censored on the web within the Turkish borders by the government. Subsequently, on July 28, he was tried in absentia at the Criminal Offices of the Judge of Peace in Golbasi and charged with terrorism.

=== Courtroom Sketches from Ai Weiwei's Legal Battle Against Volkswagen ===
Throughout 2019, during the legal proceedings involving Ai Weiwei and Skandinavisk Motor Co. A/S in Copenhagen, Costantini assumed the role of a visual documentarian, capturing the events through his drawings. His involvement was directly solicited by Ai Weiwei, given that the proceedings were conducted behind closed doors, and it was deemed crucial to preserve an accurate visual record of what transpired. Costantini was thus invited to skillfully depict the developments in the legal process, contributing to the preservation of the memory of a significant chapter in the legal dispute between the Chinese artist and the Danish automotive company.

=== Drawings for Mahsa Amini protests ===
In 2022, Costantini began to document and visually represent the Iranian protests in response to the killing of the twenty-two-year-old Mahsa Amini, an event that shook the international community. His involvement in this cause was a response to human rights violations and injustices perpetrated by the Iranian regime. Over the following year, Costantini continued to dedicate his artistic talent to documenting the women's revolution in Iran and the capital executions promoted by the regime.

Through his work, Costantini aimed to amplify the voices of Iran women and draw global attention to crucial issues related to freedom and human rights. Costantini's drawings have become a visual testimony to the struggles and aspirations of the Iranian people for freedom and justice. His works have been exhibited in many cities worldwide, including Paris, Milan, London, Berlin, Denver, Los Angeles, Vancouver, Fribourg, Tallinn, and Ottawa, reaching a broad international audience.

Costantini's solo exhibition, titled "La strage dei fiori" (The Massacre of Flowers), garnered significant interest and provided the audience with an opportunity to reflect on the complex and often dramatic realities characterizing the situation in Iran. The banner with the message "Liberty for Women in Iran" was displayed in various municipal buildings in Italy, symbolizing the support and solidarity of numerous local communities for the cause of Iranian women's rights.

In 2023, Jane Campion walked the red carpet at the Venice Film Festival wearing a drawing by Costantini.

== Publications ==
Costantini began publishing comics in 1993, starting with Italian magazines dedicated to comic publication. Over the years, he has created numerous graphic novels.

=== Graphic Novels ===
In 2008, Costantini and Elettra Stamboulis collaborated on the publication of "The Tamer of Istanbul," a biography dedicated to Osman Hamdi Bey. This biography, crafted through the amalgamation of visual storytelling and written text, represents a detailed homage to this prominent figure in the Ottoman cultural landscape. Osman Hamdi Bey, a painter, archaeologist, and museologist, is renowned for his significant contributions to the artistic and cultural scene of the Ottoman Empire. This illustrated biography provides an opportunity for the reader to explore the historical and cultural context in which Osman Hamdi Bey operated, emphasizing his diverse activities and his impact on Turkey's artistic and museal heritage.

The graphic novel titled "Julian Assange: From the Hacker Ethic to WikiLeaks" authored by Costantini and Dario Morgante and published by the Italian publisher Becco Giallo in 2011, traces the history of Julian Assange and his collaborators. It spans two decades of computer challenges, addressing many questions surrounding WikiLeaks and the hacker community that gave rise to this platform. The text provides an in-depth look into the birth and development of WikiLeaks, focusing on the controversies and impacts of its revelations, particularly the "Collateral Murder" video. The narrative offers a detailed perspective on Assange's figure, exploring the key role he played in the creation and evolution of WikiLeaks, as well as the historical context of the group's activities.

Between 2011 and 2014, Costantini collaborated with the writer Elettra Stamboulis to create three graphic novel biographies. These works were published under the titles "Dinner with Gramsci," "Goodbye Berlinguer," and "Pertini in the Clouds." The graphic novel trilogy is characterized by a unique fusion of visual storytelling and written text, providing an in-depth exploration into the lives of significant historical figures in Italian history. "Dinner with Gramsci" delves into the life and thoughts of Antonio Gramsci, "Goodbye Berlinguer" offers a perspective on Enrico Berlinguer, while "Pertini in the Clouds" focuses on the personality of Sandro Pertini.

"Officina del Macello, 1917: The Decimation of the Catanzaro Brigade" is a graphic novel that explores the period of the First World War. The year 1917 marks the third year of conflict, characterized by the harshness of life in the trenches, where many soldiers have long been separated from their homes. Created in 2014 by Costantini and Elettra Stamboulis for the Italian publishing house Eris Edizioni, this work provides a deep and poignant insight into the reality of war and the challenges faced by soldiers. The visual narration and written text merge to create an engaging experience that conveys the harshness and dehumanization of the conflict.

In 2019, he released the graphic novel "Libia," a collaborative work between the renowned artist Costantini and the acclaimed journalist Francesca Mannocchi. This work, through the powerful combination of visual art and narrative journalism, aims to explore the complex dynamics and challenges faced by Libya, a country rich in history and conflicts.

In 2022, Costantini published the graphic novel "Patrick Zaky, an Egyptian Story," a collaboration with journalist Laura Cappon. This work explores the history and life of Patrick Zaky, an Egyptian human rights activist. The visual narrative provides a unique perspective on the life of a prisoner in Egyptian prisons and on the initiatives of the Italian civil society for the defense of human rights.

In 2024, Costantini collaborates with Ai Weiwei and Elettra Stamboulis to publish the graphic novel "Zodiac." This graphic memoir deeply explores the connection between artistic expression and intellectual freedom, providing a unique perspective through the lens of the Chinese zodiac.

In 2024, Costantini published the graphic novel "Xi Jinping: The emperor of Silence" in collaboration with journalist Eric Meyer. Xi Jinping: The Emperor of Silence is a comprehensive graphic novel that chronicles the life and rise of Xi Jinping, from his childhood to his current position as the leader of China. This compelling investigation reveals his remarkable journey from his family's disgrace to his ascension to power. It also presents an analysis of modern China's history and politics. The project was conceived by Eric Meyer, a seasoned journalist who has been observing Xi Jinping's rapid rise since 2005 during his tenure as an independent press correspondent in Beijing. Meyer collaborated with Italian artist Costantini, known for his politically charged illustrations, to bring this intricate narrative to life. The graphic novel has been well-received for its in-depth portrayal of Xi Jinping and its insightful analysis of China's contemporary political landscape. Readers have praised the work for its enlightening content and the effective synergy between Meyer's investigative writing and Costantini's evocative artwork.

=== Drawings for sports ===
Throughout the year 2018, Costantini embarked on a collaboration with CNN Sport, immersing himself in the dynamics of the Winter Olympics held in Korea. His ability to capture the essence of sporting events through visual art made him a valuable asset to the editorial team.

Subsequently, Costantini turned his attention to the prestigious tennis tournament Roland Garros, located in Paris, France. His graphic interpretation of matches and key moments contributed to conveying the excitement and intensity of tennis on an international level.

Costantini's collaboration with CNN Sport continued during the 2018 FIFA World Cup held in Russia. Through his distinctive style in capturing action, Costantini brought to life the most significant moments of the football tournament in an artistic manner.

His participation in these international events solidified Costantini's reputation as an artist capable of translating the energy and atmosphere of sporting events into compelling visual works. His collaboration with CNN Sport has helped elevate the value of art in the context of sports, demonstrating the power of creativity in exploring and communicating the emotions connected to the world of sports to a global audience.

=== Underground comics ===
Between 1993 and 2000, Costantini was a prolific contributor to the Italian and European underground comic movement, publishing comics and illustrations. His works appeared in numerous self-produced and independent magazines, including but not limited to Interzona, Katzyvari, Schizzo, Alter Vox Magazine, Tribù Magazine d'urto, Fagorgo, Stripburger (Slovenia), Babel (Greece), Milk and Vodka (Switzerland), laikku (Finland), Kerosene, and Garabattage (Spain).

=== Political comics and Art Books ===
One of Costantini's notable works is the graphic novel "Linea Gotica," published in 2004 by Associazione Mirada. This compelling piece of visual storytelling delves into historical narratives, and its critical text by Sabina Ghinassi adds depth to the exploration of the Gothic Line.

In 2006, Costantini compiled a collection of his political drawings from 2003 to 2004 in the form of "Diario di un qualunquista" (Diary of an Everyman), published by Fernandel. The critical text by Daniele Brolli provides insight into the socio-political context and significance of Costantini's work during that period.

Costantini's artistic endeavors also extend to exhibitions, as seen in the catalog "Sangue in Algeria" (Blood in Algeria), presented at Galleria Miomao in 2008. The critical text by Tahar Lamri accompanies the catalog, offering a thoughtful analysis of Costantini's visual exploration of themes related to Algeria.

In 2016, he published the illustrated book "Le cicatrici tra i miei denti" (Scars Among My Teeth) under NdA Press. This work is a visual exploration of poets, showcasing Costantini's distinctive style. Critical texts for the book were provided by Lello Voce and Davide Brullo, further emphasizing the artistic significance of his creations.

Costantini's engagement with the international indie music scene is documented in his 2013 book, "Bronson Drawings," published by Giuda Edizioni. The critical texts accompanying this publication were contributed by David Vecchiato, Arturo Compagnoni, and Chris Angiolini. Through this work, Costantini not only captures the spirit of indie music but also extends the reach of his artistic expression into the dynamic world of sound and rhythm.

In 2009, he released an art catalog titled "Daily Iraq," published by Edizioni Libri Aparte, focusing on his work that delves into the profound realities of Iraq. Critical text for this catalog was provided by Elettra Stamboulis, highlighting the depth and thought-provoking nature of Costantini's creations. Additionally, another art catalog from the same year, "Untitled Drawing Art," also published by Edizioni Libri Aparte, features critical text by Viola Giacometti.

Among his extensive body of work is the travel sketchbook "Porto dei santi" (Port of Saints), published by Purple Press in 2009. The critical text for this travelogue was written by Elettra Stamboulis, providing insights into Costantini's artistic journey and explorations.

=== Newspapers ===
At the beginning of his career, Costantini started collaborating with Italian newspapers. In 1994, he began working with Il manifesto and later contributed to Corriere della Sera, La Stampa, Domani, and La Repubblica.

=== Magazines ===
==== Brazil ====
- Graffiti 76% quadrinosh, Archeangiolie (written by Fabrizio Passarella), Brazil, 2008

==== England ====
- Alan Moore portrait of an extraordinary gentleman, one illustration, Abiogenesis Press, Leigh-on-Sea, 2003
- Ctrl.Alt.Shift Unmasks Corruption, Yes we camp (written by Elettra Stamboulis), curated by Paul Gravett, London, 2010

==== Finland ====
- laikku, n°1, El hombre invisible, Helsinki, 2001

==== France ====
- Le Monde diplomatique, The story of Sheikh Mansour and other myths from Caucaso, Homecooking Books, 2010
- Numéro 0/1 Discours public – Discorso pubblico, Benito Mussolini, edizioni Les Presses Carrées, France, 2014
- Courrier International, n°1280, La storia di Chérif Kouachi, Paris, 2015

==== Germany ====
- Wendepunk.t Zeitschrift für eine Neue Zeit, n°2, Occupy Gezi, Herausgegeben von Hans-Peter Söder, Munich, 2013

==== Greece ====
- Babel, n°235, Thad damn burn the flags (written Allan Antliff), Athens, 2006
- Babel, n°237, Gaz promise (written by Elettra Stamboulis), Athens, 2006
- MOV, n°6, 8 km The history of Zhaer, BabelArt, Athens, 2010

==== Italy ====
- Schizzo, n°5, Ultimo appuntamento (written Nicola Scianamè), Cremona, ArciComics Editions, 1993
- Schizzo, n°6, Linee di confine (written Nicola Scianamè), Cremona, ArciComics Editions, 1994
- Schizzo, n°8, Desiderio (written Nicola Scianamé), Cremona, ArciComics Editions, 1994
- Neural, n°2, an illustration, Sound Machine, 1994
- Neural, n°3, an illustration, Sound Machine, 1994
- Pagina99, marzo, Salah Abdeslam, Rome, News 3.0 Spa, 2016
- Pagina99, maggio, Sharpshooters to Mosul, Rome, News 3.0 Spa, 2016
- Pagina99, giugno, Muhammad Ali and Saddam Hussein, Rome, News 3.0 Spa, 2016
- Pagina99, luglio, Aliaa Elmahdy, Rome, News 3.0 Spa, 2016
- Internazionale luglio, Postcard from Sanhan, Rome, 2016

==== Portugal ====
- Mutate&Survive, Archeangiolie (written by Fabrizio Passarella), Lisboa, 2001
- Courrier Internacional, n°33, Buttes Chaumont A Historia de Chérif Kouachi

==== Romania ====
- Anthology HardcomicSeex, El indio, Bucarest, 2006

==== Serbia ====
- Pancevac-Press, three illustrations, Pancevac Press, Pančevo, 2004
- Kuhinja, n°8, Marzabotto, curated by Aleksandar Zograf, Pančevo, 2005
- Pancevac, n°4270, 4271, 4272, 4273, Pančevo, 2008
- Skulptura? Skulpture?, five illustration, Bijenal Umetnosti, Pančevo, 2014

==== Slovenia ====
- Stripburger, n°25, El hombre invisible, Ed. Strip Core, Ljubljana, 1999
- XXX (Strip) Burger, Befanella, Ed. Strip Core, Ljubljana, 1999

==== Spain ====
- Garabattage, n°8, one illustration, Doble Dosis Ediciones, Barcelona, 2005
- Tmeo, n°40, Scarafaggi (written by Giovanni Barbieri), Edition Exten Kultur Taldea, 1996

==== Switzerland ====
- Milk and Vodka, n°1, five illustrations, Milk and Vodka Editions, Switzerland, 2000

==== Turkey ====
- LeMan, n°1229, Who's Who (written by Elettra Stamboulis), Istanbul, 2015
- LeMan, n°1224, Selahattin Demirtaș (written by Elettra Stamboulis), Istanbul, 2015
- LeMan, n°1211, Dateci LeMan (written by Elettra Stamboulis), Istanbul, 2015
- The Diplomatic Observer, n°91, an illustration, Hattusas Yaymcilik, Ankara, 2015

==== United States ====
- World War 3 Illustrated, n°37, Gaz Promise (written by Elettra Stamboulis), New York, 2006
- Pocketbook Heroes, n°2, El hombre invisible, Bare Bones Studios, Los Angeles, 2011
- World War 3 Illustrated, n°43, Julian Assange (written by Dario Morgante), New York, 2012

=== Web Publications ===
- Drawings the Times, Each week telling the news, Holland, 2016
- Pagina99, Each week telling Human Rights, Italy, 2015–2016
- Internazionale, The cold heart of Ravenna, Italy, December 22, 2015
- Words Without Borders, An Endless Green Line, United States, 2017
- eastwest, Kim and his ancestors two thousand years of North Korean Dear Leader, Italy, 2017
- eastwest, The strange holiday of Saad Hariri, Italy, 2017
- eastwest, Faces and words on the disputed Jerusalem, Italy, 2017
- eastwest, The man of the stars Taheri awaits the executioner in a prison in Iran, Italy, 2017
- eastwest, The Trump saga, from grandfather Friedrich to the Donald, Italy, 2018
- Internazionale, Giulio Regeni e il male del mondo, Italy, 2018
- CNN, My Freedom Day, United States, 2018

== Curating of cultural events ==
Costantini founding member of Mirada, an association involved in planning curating of cultural events.

- Joe Sacco Clouds from beyond the borders, MAR Museo d'arte della città, Ravenna, 2002
- The Veil of Maya Marjane Satrapi, Santa Maria delle Croci, Ravenna, 2003
- Komikazen International Reality Comics Festival, Ravenna, 2006–2015

== Editor and Published ==
During this period, significant works have been published, such as James Kochalka's "Sketchbook Diaries n°1" in 2006, Phoebe Gloeckner's "The Diary of a Teenage Girl" in 2006, Stefano Tamburini's "Snake Agents" in 2006, James Kochalka's "Sketchbook Diaries n°2" in 2007, Phoebe Gloeckner's "A Child's Life and Other Stories" in 2007, Ramize Erer's "Weddings" in 2007, Danijel Zezelj's "Sun City" in 2007, Carlos Latuff's "#Syria" in 2012, and Gord Hill's "The 500 Years of Resistance" in 2013.

From 2003 to 2007, Costantini was the editor of the underground comic magazine inguineMAH!gazine. The publication ran for eleven issues through collaborations with Coniglio Editore and Fernandel Edizioni. Subsequently, starting in 2008, two anthology issues were published under the auspices of Comma22 publishing house.

Within the pages of this magazine, significant contributions were made by prominent international authors, including Joe Sacco, Julie Doucet, Blu, Miguel Brieva, Max Andersson, James Kochalka, Eric Drooker, Aleksandar Zograf, and many others...

From 2009 to 2015, Costantini served as the artistic director and editor-in-chief of the G.I.U.D.A. (Geographical Institute of Unconventional Drawings Arts) magazine, a publication that merges comic art and illustration with the realm of geography.

Giuda is not just a magazine but a true conceptual space. This publication is dedicated to exploring the betrayal of images, employing drawing intensively to map out what can be said and represented. It positions itself as a designed space for visual research and aesthetics, chasing after the locations charted on maps. It is aware that the map is not the territory but rather a representation of it. Starting from cartography, the magazine explores how it establishes our role in the world and the symbolic space we occupy.

In Giuda, every element is drawn, from the editorial content to the advertisements. It is a collector's magazine, refusing to conform to the conventions of modern publishing. With a decadent and romantic inclination, it utilizes the contemporary context of drawing to traverse the cemetery roads of metropolises; even in the first issue, the faces of illustrious deceased individuals from the Montparnasse Cemetery emerge.

== Personal exhibitions ==
=== Personal exhibitions ===
- Costantini exhibition at the Scuola Grande di San Rocco in Venice, curated by Global Campus of Human Rights, 2020
- Pen Portraits of Imprisoned Journalists, Southampton Central Library, curated by Amnesty International UK, 2020
- Costantini: Drawing the Reality, Lugano, Studio 1929, Festival of Human Rights in Lugano, 2015
- American Nocturne, Ferrara, Zuni Arte, 2014
- Untitled Drawing Art, Modena, d406 Gallery, 2014
- Stop Bombing Gaza, Buenos Aires, Museos de Humor grafico Diogenes Taborda, 2014
- Whispers and cries in digital democracy, Ferrara, Zuni Arte, 2013
- Gramsci a comic book biography, Perugia, Miomao Art Gallery, 2012
- Abra Kadabra, Ancona, Quattrocentometriquadi Gallery, 2011
- Liturgy of drawn porn, Rome, Mondo Bizzarro Gallery, 2011
- WikiLeaks, Pietrasanta, La Subbia Gallery, 2011
- Vorrei incontrarti (with music of Alan Sorrenti), Piombino, Il Castello, Visionaria Film Festival, 2005

=== Performance ===
- Channeldraw hangs drawings, not people, Festival Transeuropa, Madrid, Matadero, 2017
