= Stripburger =

Comics magazine based in Slovenia

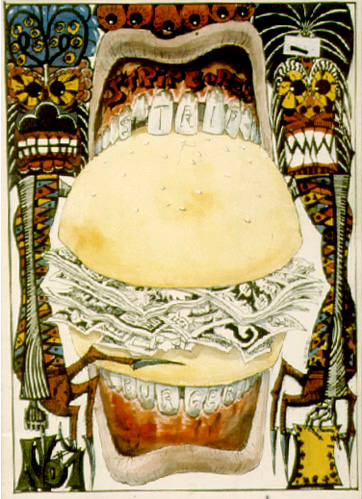
- Cover of the first Stripburger zine by Jakob Klemenčič & Božo Rakočević (1992)

Publication information
- Publisher: Stripburger
- Format: Ongoing series
- Genre: Underground/alternative
- Publication date: 1992–present

Creative team
- Created by: Samo Ljubešić, Jani Mujić, Božo Rakočević, Dare Kuhar, Katerina Mirović

Stripburger is an alternative comics magazine featuring works by both Slovene and foreign comic authors, published in Slovenia by the editorial collective of the same name.

Stripburger features works by Slovene and foreign comic authors, together with news, reviews, interviews, and reflections on the comics medium. Being multilingual (Slovenian and English), the magazine has developed into an important resource on the international (especially European) comic scene.

Besides the magazine, Stripburger also publishes stand-alone comic books, original Slovenian works, and translations of alternative international comic books and graphic novels. An important part of Stripburger's activities is its focus on comics exhibitions and workshops.

== Stripburger magazine ==
Stripburger was established in 1992 by the Strip Core collective — Samo Ljubešić, Jani Mujić, Božo Rakočević, Dare Kuhar, and Katerina Mirović — as an international art fanzine, thus becoming a pioneer of independent comics in Slovenia.

In its 30 years, Stripburger has featured more than 700 artists from more than 30 countries all around the world. Currently, two editions of the magazine are issued annually.

== Special issues ==
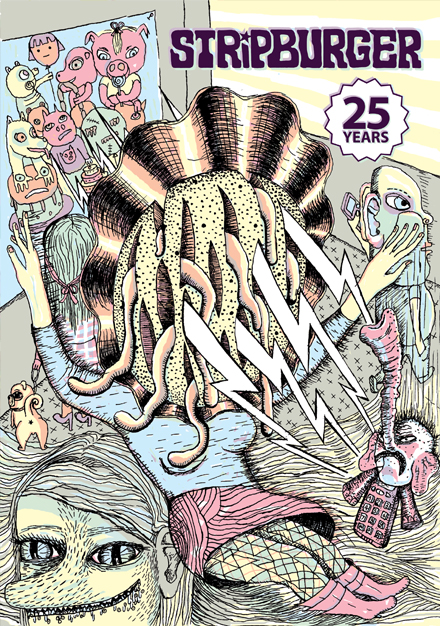
Cover of Stripburger #70, issued on 25th anniversary of magazine (2017). Art by Caroline Sury.

Occasionally, Stripburger publishes special issues that focus on specific themes like ecology, sex, madness, anti-Nazism, human rights, war, handicaps, and work.

Notable issues:

- Stripburek - Comics from Behind the Rusty Iron Curtain (1997) - anthology of Eastern European comics, featuring work from Serbia, Croatia, Bosnia and Slovenia
- Handyburger (1998) - publication about physical handicaps made in cooperation with YHD (Društvo za teorijo in kulturo hendikepa; Society for Disability Theory and Culture)
- XXX(Strip)burger (1999)
- Stripburek - Comics from the other Europe (2001) — comics from Albania, Bosnia and Herzegovina, Bulgaria, Croatia, the Czech Republic, Estonia, Hungary, Macedonia, Poland, Romania, Russia, Slovenia, Ukraine, and Yugoslavia
- Madburger (2002) – comics questioning sanity and shattering the taboo called madness
- Warburger (2003)
- Miniburger (2004) – dirty dozen and the lucky 13th (a box of 12 booklets in b&w and the 13th in full color)
- Honey Talks - Comics Inspired by Painted Beehive Panels (2006) – comics inspired by a form of Slovene folk art, namely painted beehive panels
- Greetings from Cartoonia: The Essential Guide of the Land of Comics (2009) - result of international project in which artists from abroad were given the task of creating a portrait of Slovenia, while artists living in Slovenia were asked to make a portrait of the countries their foreign colleagues come from
- Workburger: Custom-Made Product with a Flawless Defect (2012) - comics revolving around the topic of contemporary work

== Collections ==
Varying in genre and expression, Stripburger's four collections include stand-alone comic books by different artists.

=== Republika Strip ===
Collection of comic albums/books. It was established in 2002 to publish original Slovenian artists and their works.

Published artists: Andrej Štular, Ciril Horjak, Damijan Stepančič, Domen Finžgar, Gašper Rus, Grega Mastnak, Izar Lunaček, Iztok Sitar, Jakob Klemenčič, Kaja Avberšek, Marijan Pušavec (script writer), Marko Kociper, Matej de Cecco, Matej Kocjan - Koco, Matej Lavrenčič, Matej Stupica, Miha Mazzini, Tomaž Lavrič, Vinko Möderndorfer (writer of short stories after which the comics in the Deveta soba collection were made).

=== Ambasada Strip ===
This collection, established in 2006, aims to present world-class comics by foreign artists to Slovenian audience.

Published artists: Claudio Piersanti (script), Daniel Clowes, Dave Cooper, David B., Gipi, Gunnar Lundkvist, Helena Klakočar, Jacques Tardi, Joann Sfar, Julie Doucet, Kim Deitch, Lars Fiske, Lorenzo Mattotti, Marcel Ruijters, Matthias Lehmann, Max Andersson, Nicolas Presl, Posy Simmonds, Riad Sattouf, Simon Deitch.

=== Minimundus ===
Comic works for young readers and experimental works. Most of them are in Slovene, though some Minimudus pieces also come as bilingual.

Published artists: Andrej Štular, Boštjan Gorenc (script), David Krančan, Francesco Satta (script), Jakob Klemenčič, Kaja Avberšek, Manka Kremenšek Križman, Marjan Manček, Matej de Cecco, Matej Kocjan - Koco, Matej Lavrenčič, Matjaž Schmidt, Miha Hančič, Peter Kus (script), Sara Colaone, Saša Kerkoš, Tanja Komadina.

=== O Editions ===
Various experimental projects (bordering on poetry, music etc.) or books that can not be labeled are done under the O editions.

== Awards ==
- 2001 Angoulême International Comics Festival Fanzine Prize (Angoulême International Comics Festival)
- 2012 Golden Pear (for Marjan Manček: Hribci Kremeniti, Ljubljana city library)
- 2014 Muriel Honorary Award (KomiksFEST! in Prague, Nov 2014)
- 2015 The White Ravens (for Tanja Komadina: Fino kolo, Internationale Jugendbibliothek München, Oct 2015)
- 2015 Best comic book design (for David Krančan: Pijani zajec, Slovenian book fair, Nov 2015)

== Exhibitions and collaborations ==
Stripburger has always been an internationally oriented collective, with frequent exhibitions around Europe and also Russia. In recent years, it visited Maison de la Culture de le Tournai (BE), L’An Vert, Liege (BE), Helsinki Comics Festival, Galerija SC (HR), Nextcomics Festival (AT), KomiksFEST! (CZ), Treviso Comic Book Festivalu (IT), Le Garage L. (FR), The Millionaires Club (TMC) (DE), Galerie 1er degre (DE), etc.

=== 2001: "Perventiquattromilabaci" ===
In association with Elettra Stamboulis and the Mirada Cultural Association, Stripburger curated the collective exhibition "Perventiquattromilabaci" [For Twenty-Four Thousand Kisses], which presented the alternative comics scene in the former Yugoslavia and in the Balkans.

=== 2006: "Honey Talks" ===
Stripburger collaborated with the Slovene Ethnographic Museum, which in 2006 hosted the widely acclaimed anthology Honey Talks — comics inspired by painted beehive panels reinterpreting the 19th-century folk art, with works by 12 international comics artists (including Marcel Ruijters, Milorad Krstić, Jakob Klemenčič, Koco, Anke Feuchtenberger, Vladan Nikolić, Matthias Lehmann, Rutu Modan, and Danijel Žeželj). The exhibition included original comics, modern interpretations of beehive panels, beehive panel replicas, and an animated movie by Matej Lavrenčič (A Huntsman and a Funeral). "Honey Talks" was exhibited at the 2007 Komikazen International Reality Comics Festival, held in Ravenna, Italy.

=== 2009: "Greetings from Cartoonia" ===
In 2009, Stripburger produced the international exhibition "Greetings from Cartoonia" in Slovene Ethnographic Museum to complement the special issue, an anthology, of the same name. It was made in collaboration with 6 European comic associations - Dongery (Norway), Chili Com Carne (Portugal), Fundacja Transmisja (Poland), The Finnish Comics Society (Finland), Hardcomics (Romania) and Vivacomix (Italy).

Later, the exhibition traveled to the Festival Internacional de BD de Beja, Portugal (2010), La Zone Cultural Centre in Liège, Belgium (2011), the Anim'est, International Festival of Animated Film in Bucharest, Romania (2011), and to Linz, Austria.

=== 2010: "Underground and Above the Clouds" ===
In collaboration with the Vžigalica Gallery, City Museum of Ljubljana, and KUD France Prešeren Gallery, Stripburger celebrated its 18th birthday in 2010 with exhibitions, lectures, comic workshops, and with the première of the animated film Stripburger in Motion [Stripburger v gibanju], directed by Boris Dolenc, prod.: Forum Ljubljana, coprod.: Invida] in Kinodvor Cinema.

=== 2013: "Attention, Work!" ===
The "Attention, Work!" exhibition accompanied the Workburger special issue, featuring about 50 comics artists from all over the world. It was opened in November 2013 at The Coal Mining Museum of Slovenia.

It was also presented at the Slovene ethnographic museum in Ljubljana, The Millionaires Club Comics & Graphics Festival in Leipzig, Germany; Le Garage L. in Forcalquier, France; Treviso Comic Book Festival in Italy; KomiksFEST! in Prague, Czech Republic (2014); Biblioteca Civica del Comune di Pordenone in Pordenone, Italy; Nextcomic Festival in Steyr, Austria; 30th Helsinki Comics Festival in Finland; Gallery SC in Zagreb, Croatia (2015); L'An Vert, Le Cercle du Laveu, Le Comptoir in Liege, Belgium; Institut Saint-Luc Tournai, Maison de la Culture de le Tournai in Tournai, Belgium; Stockholm International Comics Festival, Sweden; Tenderete Festival in Valencia, Spain; AltCom 2016 in Malmö, Sweden (2016); Gutter fest in Barcelona, Spain; and Oslo Comics Expo, Norway (2017).

=== 2017: Tinta festival ===
In October 2017 Stripburger co-produced the Tinta Comics Festival together with Kino Šiška, Zavod Stripolis, Radio Študent, Strip.art.nica Buch/Zavod Strip art, and VigeVageKnjige.

== Education ==
Stripburger holds different workshops and competitions to promote comics culture with younger readers.

=== Viva i Fumetti! / Živel strip! ===
An important Stripburger activity is the Viva i Fumetti! / Živel strip! (Long live comics!) comics-making competition, running since 2005 in collaboration with the Italian Vivacomix association, who was an initiator of the project. It is aimed at primary and high school students from the Friuli-Venezia Giulia region of Italy and Slovenia.

== Editorial board ==
=== Current ===
- Katerina Mirović (1992- )
- David Krančan (2002- )
- Domen Finžgar (2009- )
- Bojan Albahari (2009- )
- Tanja Skale (2013- )
- Ana Bogataj (2016- )
- Katja Štesl (2018- )

=== Former ===
- "Strip Core": Samo Ljubešić, Jani Mujić, Božo Rakočević, Dare Kuhar, Katerina Mirović (1992)
- Boris Bačić (1992–2001)
- Jakob Klemenčič (1992, 1994–1999, 2007–2008)
- Matjaž Bertoncelj (1995–2000)
- Igor Prassel (1995–2006)
- Matej Kocjan-Koco (1998–2004)
- Olmo Omerzu (2001–2002)
- Ivan Mitrevski (2002–2006)
- Žiga Aljaž (2002–2004)
- Matej de Cecco (2005–2007)
- Gašper Rus (2006–2010)
- Tea Hvala (2007–2008)
- Kaja Avberšek (2009–2019)

Consulting editor for special issues: Robert Boyd
Shadow editors: Dani Kavaš, Tomaž Gorkič
