= Komikazen =

Defunct Italian comics festival

Komikazen International Reality Comics Festival
- Status: active
- Genre: Comics
- Venue: MAR (Ravenna Museum of Art) and other venues
- Location: Ravenna Rimini
- Country: Italy
- Inaugurated: 2005
- Most recent: 2016
- Organizer: Mirada Cultural Association
- Website: KomikazenFestival.org

The Komikazen International Reality Comics Festival (Italian: Komikazen festival internazionale del fumetto di realtà) was an annual festival focusing on non-fiction comics. It occurred every year between 2005 and 2016 in Ravenna, Italy, usually in the month of October. Komikazen was sponsored by the Mirada Association and organized by Elettra Stamboulis and Gianluca Costantini.

"Created with the aim of researching and investigating the relationships between the presentation of reality and graphic literature," the festival was intended to promote and celebrate Ravenna as the capital of "reality-based" comics. The festival had no commercial areas, but instead focused on exhibitions, workshops, and discussions.

As in the French city of Angoulême during the Angoulême International Comics Festival, shops in Ravenna often customized their window displays with comics themes during the festival period. Related exhibitions in various venues in the Ravenna area generally remained on display for at least a month after the festival.

== History ==
Mirada ("look" in Spanish) was founded in 1997 and moved to Ravenna in 2000. Its mission is to identify and promote young artists from the Ravenna region. Mirada was part of the Periscopages Association (based in Rennes, France), an organization devoted to independent comics that included Babel (Athens, Greece), Comica (London, UK), Chili cum Carne (Lisbon, Portugal), the Boom Festival (St. Petersburg, Russia), and La Maison du Livre (Beirut, Lebanon). Periscopages Association disbanded in 2012.

The first Komikazen was held on September 30, 2005, with special guests Phoebe Gloeckner, Joe Sacco, and Marjane Satrapi.

The 2006 festival featured Turkish cartoonists of the long-running comics magazine Leman.

In 2007, the festival expanded to two days, and inaugurated the GEAR Awards, celebrating young artists of the local Emilia-Romagna region. In attendance were more than 50 artists from the nonfiction comics magazines Strapazin (Switzerland), Babel (Athens), Glomp (Finland), Chili Com Carne (Portugal), Hard Comics (Romania), and Stripoteka (Sarajevo, Bosnia). The exhibition Honey Talks was sponsored by Stripburger. Artists featured in the exhibition included Danijel Zezelj, Rutu Modan, and Matthias Lehmann.

The 2008 festival featured the first exhibition of Lebanese cartoonists in Italy.

The 2009 show focused on stories that "originate with individual tension, research and experimentation."

The 2010 Komikazen expanded to three days.

The theme of the 2012 festival was the representations of Italy and featured more thirty Italian cartoonists and caricaturists: Luca Amerio, Luca Baino, Francesco Barilli, Paolo Bacilieri, Lelio Bonaccorso, Riccardo Cecchetti, Sara Colaone, Paolo Cossi, Gianluca Costantini, Manuel De Carli, Matteo Fenoglio Luca Ferrara, Manfredi Giffoni, Rocco Lombardi, Simone Lucciola, Riccardo Mannelli, Giuseppe Palumbo, Paolo Parisi, Luigi Politano, Tuono Pettinato, Marco Pugliese, Davide Reviati, Marco Rizzo, Luca Salici, Caterina Sansone, Leonora Sartori, Pietro Scarnera, Elettra Stamboulis, Mattia Surroz, Alessandro Tota, Bepi Vigna, Andrea Vivaldo, Zerocalcare, Andrea Zoli. In addition, Komikazen was final event in the Italian national competition "Reality Draws."

The 2013 festival was themed in solidarity with the Occupy movement—99 cartoonists came to Ravenna and made work related to the concept of "We are the 99%."

The theme of the 2014 festival was autobiography and biography. Headline guests included Eddie Campbell and Gipi.

The 2015 festival featured special guests Ted Rall and Carlos Latuff.

The final Komikazen festival was held June 20–22, 2016.

== Official prizes ==
The GAER (Giovani Artisti dell'Emilia Romagna) prize is awarded to young cartoonists of the Emilia-Romagna region, whose work is then published in time for the following year's festival. Award ceremonies and exhibitions are held at the Ravenna Office of Youth Policy.

- 2007 — awarded to Marino Neri and Leonardo Guardigli, whose work was published by Kappa Edizioni and Centro Fumetto Andrea Pazienza respectively
- 2008 — Marina Girardi, published by Comma 22
- 2009 — Pietro Scarnera, published by Comma 22
- 2010 — Fabio Sera, published by Comma 22
- 2011 — Andrea Zoli, published by Comma 22
- 2012 — Jacopo Frey and Nicola Gobbi, published by Comma 22

== Locations and dates ==
| No. | Dates | Locations | Notable guests | Notes |
|---|---|---|---|---|
| 1 | September 30, 2005 | MAR (Ravenna Museum of Art), Almagià, and the Ravenna Youth Center | Phoebe Gloeckner, Joe Sacco, Marjane Satrapi, Tomaž Lavrič TBC, Nicole Schulman, Kamel Khélif, Felipe Hernández Cava | |
| 2 | October 12, 2006 | Mirada Art Gallery | Anke Feuchtenberger, Felipe Cava, Danijel Zezelj, Jessica Lurie, Vittorio Giardino, Giuseppe Palumbo, Massimo Carlotto, Raùl, Mehmet Çağçağ, Tuncay Akgün, Ramize Erer, Güneri İçoğlu | |
| 3 | October 12–13, 2007 | Albergo Cappello Ravenna and Mirada Art Gallery | Ho Che Anderson (guest of honor), Le Dernier Cri, Stefano Ricci, Filipe Abranches, Tommi Musturi, Marcel Ruijters, Matei Branei, Kostas Maniatopoulos, Paul Gravett, Milos Javonovic, Jacob Klemencic, Gaspar Rus, Marcos Farrajota, Kati Rickenbach, Ines Didovic, Armin Barducci, Andrea Bruno | Inauguration of the GAER awards |
| 4 | October 11–12, 2008 | S. Maria delle Croci | Anke Feuchtenberger, Federico Del Barrio, Zeina Abirached, Giuseppe Palumbo, Mazen Kerbaj, Nadim Tarazi, Samir Harb | |
| 5 | October 9–10, 2009 | Teatro Rasi, Spazio Politiche Giovanili, MAR (Museum of Art), Libreria Mirada | Dave McKean (guest of honor), Peter Kuper, Carlos Trillo, Gianluca Costantini, Davide Toffolo, Gianfranco Bettin, Paul Gravett, Paolo Bacilieri | |
| 6 | October 8–10, 2010 | Teatro Rasi, MAR (Museum of Art) | Igort, Apostolos Doxiadis, Maximilien Le Roy, Alecos Papadatos, Aleksandar Zograf, Pablo Auladell, Apostolos Doxiadis, Maximilien Le Roy, Pietro Scarnera | |
| 7 | November 9–13, 2011 | MAR (Museum of Art), myCamera Gallery | Amir & Khalil, Seth Tobocman, Ganzeer, Morvandiau, Magdy El Shafee, Pino Creanza, Giancarlo Ascari, Barrack Rima, Frédéric Coché, Olivier Deprez, Fabio Sera, Matteo Guarnaccia, Helena Klakočar | Off-site event in Bologna |
| 8 | October 11–14, 2012 | MAR (Museum of Art), Le Cantine di Palazzo Rava | Shout, Carlos Latuff, Riccardo Mannelli | Festival preview in Bologna; finale in Faenza |
| 9 | October 11–13, 2013 | MAR (Museum of Art) | Aleksandar Zograf, Giuseppe Palumbo | |
| 10 | October 9–12, 2014 | MAR (Museum of Art), Casa delle Marionette (the House of Puppets), Classense Library, Rasi Theatre, Cellars of Palazzo Rava, Casa delle Donne (Women’s House) | Eddie Campbell, Gipi, Giuseppe Palumbo, Gord Hill, Hamid-Reza Vassaf, Ugo Bertotti, Tuono Pettinato, Rocco Lombardi, Marina Girardi, David Vecchiato, Liliana Salone, Maurizio Ribichini, Roberto Recchioni | |
| 11 | October 8–11, 2015 | Mirada Art Gallery, Le Cantine di Palazzo Rava | Ted Rall, Khalid Albaih, Cem Dinlenmiş, Kara Sievewright, Gary Embury, Augusto Palm, Carlos Latuff, Soloup, Ghiannis Ioannou, Ghiannis Michailidis, and Ghiannis Koukoulas | |
| 12 | June 20–22, 2016 | Domus del chirurgo, Teatro degli Atti | Diala Brisly, Eva Hilhorst, Squaz, Davide Reviati, Micol Beltramini, Andrea Bruno, Pietro Scarnera, Angelo Mennillo, Rocco Lombardi, Simone Pace, Maurizio Lacavallao, Adriano De Vincentiis, and Chiara Abastanotti | |

== See also ==
- European comics
- Lucca Comics & Games
