= Detention of Patrick Zaki =

2020–2023 Egyptian legal case

- Date: February 7, 2020 – July 19, 2023
- Location: Egypt
- Type: Arbitrary detention
- Arrests: Patrick George Zaki
- Charges: "Spreading false news," "inciting to protest," "incitement to violence and terrorist crimes"
- Sentence: 3 years in prison (pardoned by presidential decree)

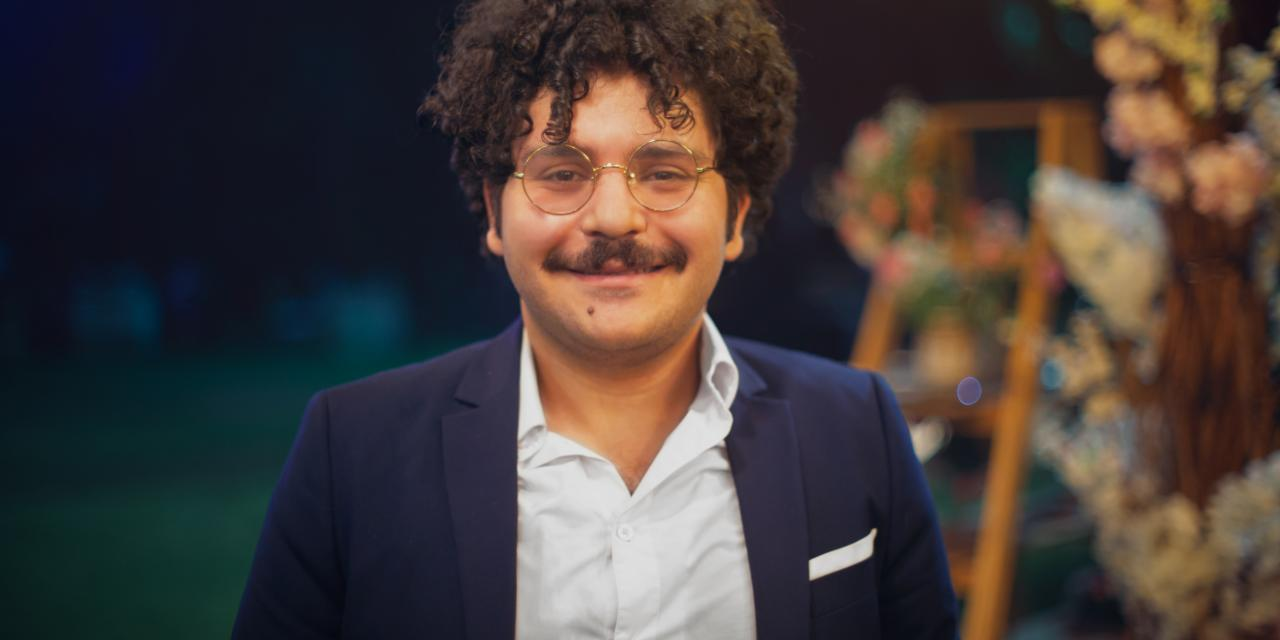
Patrick Zaki in 2020

Patrick George Zaki is a Coptic Egyptian who was a postgraduate student at the University of Bologna, Italy, when he was detained in Egypt from 7 February 2020 until 9 December 2021. Zaki was pursuing an Erasmus Mundus Master’s Degree in Women and Gender Studies at the University of Bologna. He also has conducted research and advocacy on gender issues and human rights for the Egyptian Initiative for Personal Rights (EIPR), a human rights organization based in Cairo.

On 9 December 2021, Zaki was released from prison, although the charges against him were not dropped. Zaki was eventually sentenced to three years in prison on 18 July 2023, but was pardoned by Egyptian President Abdel Fattah el-Sisi and released the following day.

== Arrest ==
Zaki was arrested on arriving at Cairo International Airport when he returned home from Bologna for a short family visit. The National Security Agency of Egypt reportedly arrested Zaki, interrogated him about his time in Italy and his human rights work, and took him to an undisclosed location. He has been detained on charges including "disseminating false news" and "inciting to protest". According to his lawyer, National Security Agency (NSA) officers kept him blindfolded and handcuffed throughout his 17 hours’ interrogation at the airport and then at an undisclosed NSA location in Mansoura, where they questioned him about his human rights work and what he was doing in Italy. During interrogation, he was allegedly frequently threatened, beaten on his stomach and back and tortured with electric shocks.

== Detention ==
On 8 February, Zaki was brought to a public prosecutor’s office and prosecutors ordered his detention for 15 days pending investigations into allegations of spreading fake news and calling for unauthorised protests. The chief prosecutor denied allegations of police torture. On 10 March, the Egyptian authorities suspended prison visits to prevent the spread of COVID-19, but did not introduce alternative means of communication between families and detainees as prescribed by Egyptian law. Zaki has asthma and was at particular risk if exposed to COVID-19 in Tora Prison. On 5 May 2020, Supreme State Security prosecutors (SSSP) renewed his detention for 15 days pending investigations without Zaki or his lawyer present. The prison authorities failed to transfer him to the SSSP for seven weeks to attend his detention renewal session. On 7 October 2020 his detention was extended for a further 45 days. In November 2020 three senior staff members of the Egyptian Initiative for Personal Rights were also arrested, including the executive director, Gasser Abdel-Razek, on terrorism-related charges after they had met Western diplomats to discuss Egypt's human rights situation in Egypt. They were released at the beginning of December following international pressure, however on 6 December Patrick Zaki's sentence was extended. On 17 January 2021 his detention was renewed for a further 15 days.

== International pressure ==
David Sassoli, the President of the European Parliament, tabled two parliamentary enquiries in Strasbourg in February 2020. The first on 10 February called raised the High Representative's attention to the case and asked them to raise the case with Egyptian authorities asking for Zaki’s immediate release. The second, on 12 February reiterates the request and reminded the Egyptian authorities that "EU relations with third countries rely on respect for human and civil rights, as confirmed by many resolutions approved by the European Parliament.". It asks for a review of Europe's relationships with Egypt and asks whether this could call for a suspension of the free trade agreement unless Zaki and other activists who are unfairly tried are released.

On 1 October 2020, twenty-six Italian Members of the European Parliament wrote a letter to the Italian ambassador to Cairo, Giampaolo Cantini, asking for a decided commitment for the release of Patrick Zaki. On 16 December 2020 the European Parliament passed a resolution on the deteriorating situation of human rights in Egypt, in particular the EIPR activists, which "calls for Patrick George Zaki’s immediate and unconditional release and for all charges against him to be dropped."

Philip Luther, Amnesty International’s Research and Advocacy Director for the Middle East and North Africa, said "The authorities’ arbitrary arrest and torture of Patrick Zaki is yet another example of the state’s deep-rooted repression of perceived opponents and human rights’ defenders, which reaches more audacious levels with each passing day."

Scholars at Risk has urged the Egyptian authorities for Mr. Zaki's immediately release and, pending this regard for his well-being and access to legal counsel, family, and medical treatment. On 12 December 2020 the Hollywood actress Scarlett Johansson stood up for the release of Patrick Zaki and three other EIPR activists with a video that was shared on international media.

On 14 April 2021, the Senate of the Republic passed a motion to ask President Mattarella the recognition of Italian citizenship for Zaki for "special reasons".

== Pressure from Italy and temporary release of Zaki ==
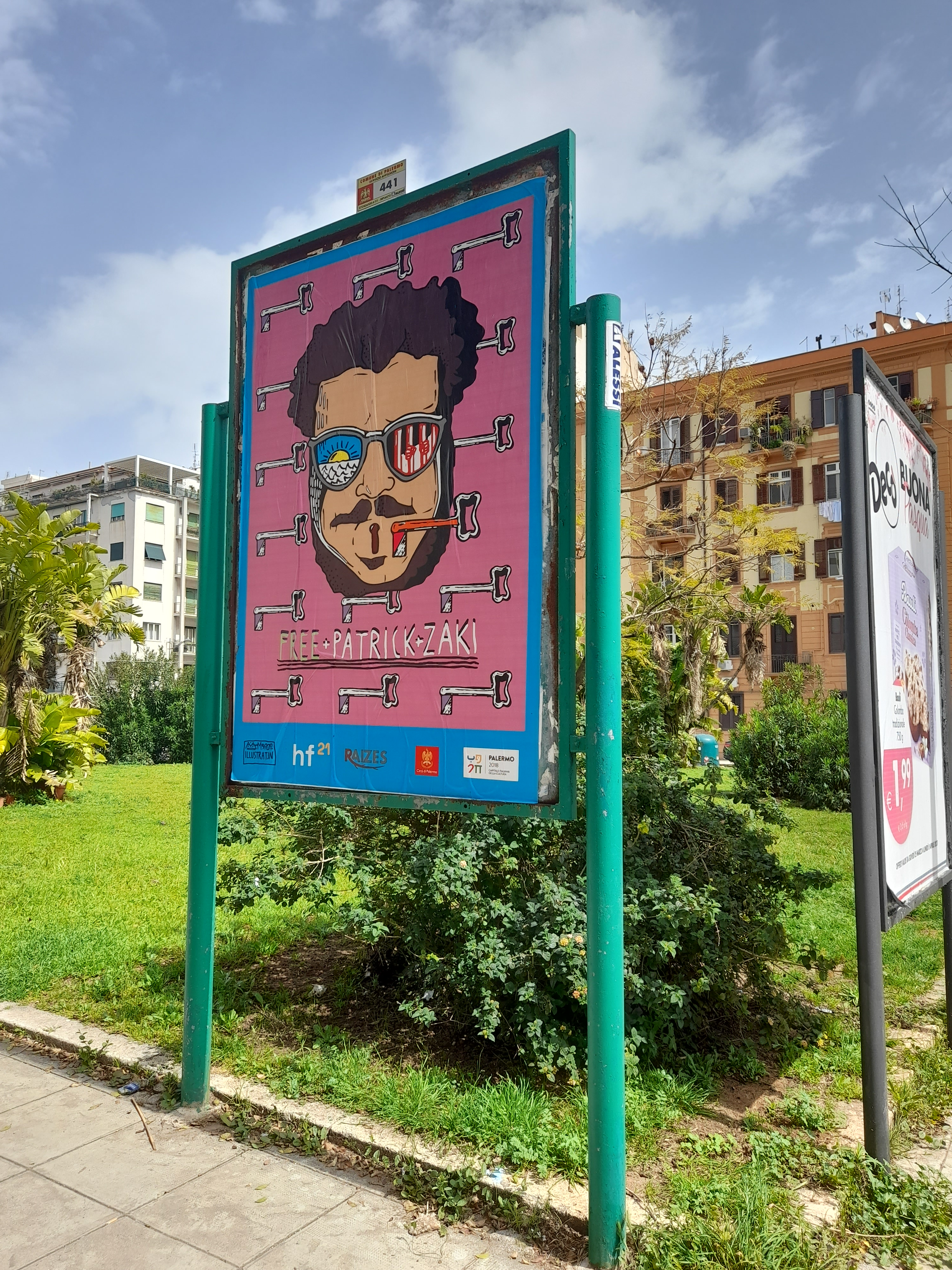
Manifesto about Zaki's liberation in the Italian city of Palermo.

After news of his arrest, protests were organized in Italy by some of Zaki's friends, other students, human rights organisations, and several Italian universities. Many Italian cities conferred honorary citizenship on Zaki as part of the 100 cities for Patrick Zaki campaign, including Bologna, Milan, Naples and Florence. Twelve Italian universities that are members of Scholars at Risk Italy section signed a letter to the Egyptian authorities calling for the release of Patrick Zaki. On 21 December 2020, the Italian conference of rectors, CRUI, petitioned Egyptian president al-Sisi to grant Mr Zaki permission to await trial from his home.

The Patrick Zaki case is said to have rekindled the trauma of the murder of Giulio Regeni, Italian PhD student from the University of Cambridge who was murdered after he went missing in Cairo in January 2016. Regeni's parents issued a statement in February 2020 calling on Italy to do more to help Zaki. The Italian government has been accused of inaction and of preferring to focus on the development of shared economic, financial and military interests. Italy has strong trade connections and investments in Egypt, and is one of the largest European investors in the country. Eni, an Italian oil and gas company, invested 16 billion dollars in Egypt’s Zohr natural gas field. Diplomatic relations between Egypt-Italy became strained after the murder of Regeni, the Italian ambassador to Egypt was withdrawn, but a new ambassador was appointed a year later. Relations between Italy and Egypt began to normalise again, and in 2020 prime minister Giuseppe Conte approved the sale of two frigates built by Fincantieri. This is said to be part of a larger potential weapons deal, believed to be worth between €9bn and €10bn and has been criticized by human rights groups.

On 14 April 2021, a majority of the upper house Senate in Italy voted in favor of urging the government to grant Italian citizenship to Zaki for his release from the prison as he had been held for more than an year without a trial. Previous calls by Rome for the release of Zaki were rebuffed, pushing the Senate to suggest the government granting him citizenship to make the process easier. The vote was overwhelmingly welcomed by senate support of 208 to 0, with 33 abstentions. However, the decision is not finalized yet, as the deputy Foreign Minister Marina Sereni hinted that such a move could also result in making the situation counterproductive, with Zaki being an Egyptian citizen.

After calls from Rome and other institutions towards Egypt, Zaki was released on 9 December 2021. The charges against him have not been dropped, however, and Zaki was set to attend a hearing on 6 April 2022. His trial was then postponed multiple times. On 29 November 2022 the trial was postponed to 28 February 2023.

== Conviction and pardon of Zaki ==
On 18 July 2023, Zaki was declared guilty of the charge of "spreading fake news" and sentenced to three years of imprisonment, though the court immediately reduced the imprisonment term to fourteen months, since Zaki had already spent 22 months in preventive detention.

However, on the following day, Egyptian President Abdel Fattah el-Sisi pardoned Zaki and ordered his release. Zaki returned to Italy on 23 July.

== See also ==
- "Patrick Zaki, una storia egiziana", by Gianluca Costantini e Laura Cappon, Graphic Novel, Feltrinelli, Italy, 2022
- The Shield of the Line for Patrick Zaki, by Elettra Stamboulis
- Scholars at Risk
- Academic freedom in the Middle East
- Murder of Giulio Regeni
