= Ciril (given name) =

Slovene masculine given name

Ciril is a masculine given name common to Slovenia

== People ==
- Ciril Bergles, Slovene poet
- Ciril Cvetko, Slovene composer
- Ciril Grossklaus, Swiss judoka
- Ciril Horjak, Slovene illustrator
- Ciril Klinar, Slovenian ice hockey player
- Ciril Kotnik, Yugoslav diplomat of Slovene ethnicity
- Ciril Metod Koch, Slovene architect
- Ciril Kosmač, Slovenian novelist
- Ciril Pelhan, Yugoslav swimmer
- Ciril Praček, Slovenian skier
- Ciril Ribičič, Slovenian jurist
- Ciril Zlobec, Slovene poet

== See also ==
- Ćiril Ban, Croatian rower
