= Angoulême International Comics Festival Fanzine Prize =

Comics award category

The Fanzine Prize is awarded to comics fanzines at the Angoulême International Comics Festival.

== 1980s ==
- 1981: Basket Bitume from Tours
- 1981 (joint winner): Plein la gueule pour pas un rond from Montrouge
- 1982: Instant pathétique from Angoulême
- 1982 (joint winner): Plein la gueule pour pas un rond from Montrouge
- 1983: Dommage from Confolens
- 1984: Lard Frit
- 1985: Pizza from Nantes
- 1986: Sapristi from Dieppe-Tours
- 1987: Champagne
- 1988: Sortez la chienne
- 1989: Café noir

== 1990s ==
- 1990: Le lézard
- 1991: Reciproquement
- 1992: Hop
- 1993: Jade
- 1994: Le goinfre
- 1995: Rêve-en-bulles
- 1996: La Monstrueuse by Stéphane Blanquet
- 1997: Tao , Caen
- 1998: Drozophile , Switzerland
- 1999: Panel

== 2000s ==
- 2000: Faille temporelle
- 2001: Stripburger , Slovenia
  - Special mention: Le collectionneur de Bandes-dessinées
- 2002: Le phaco de Nice
- 2003: Rhinocéros contre éléphant
- 2004: Sturgeon White Moss by Sylvia Farago
- (2005: no award in this category)
- (2006: no award in this category)

== 2020s ==
- 2020: Komikaze #18 (from Croatia)
- 2021: KUTIKUTI, The Thick book of KUTI (from Finland)
