= Zehra Doğan =

Kurdish journalist (born 1989)

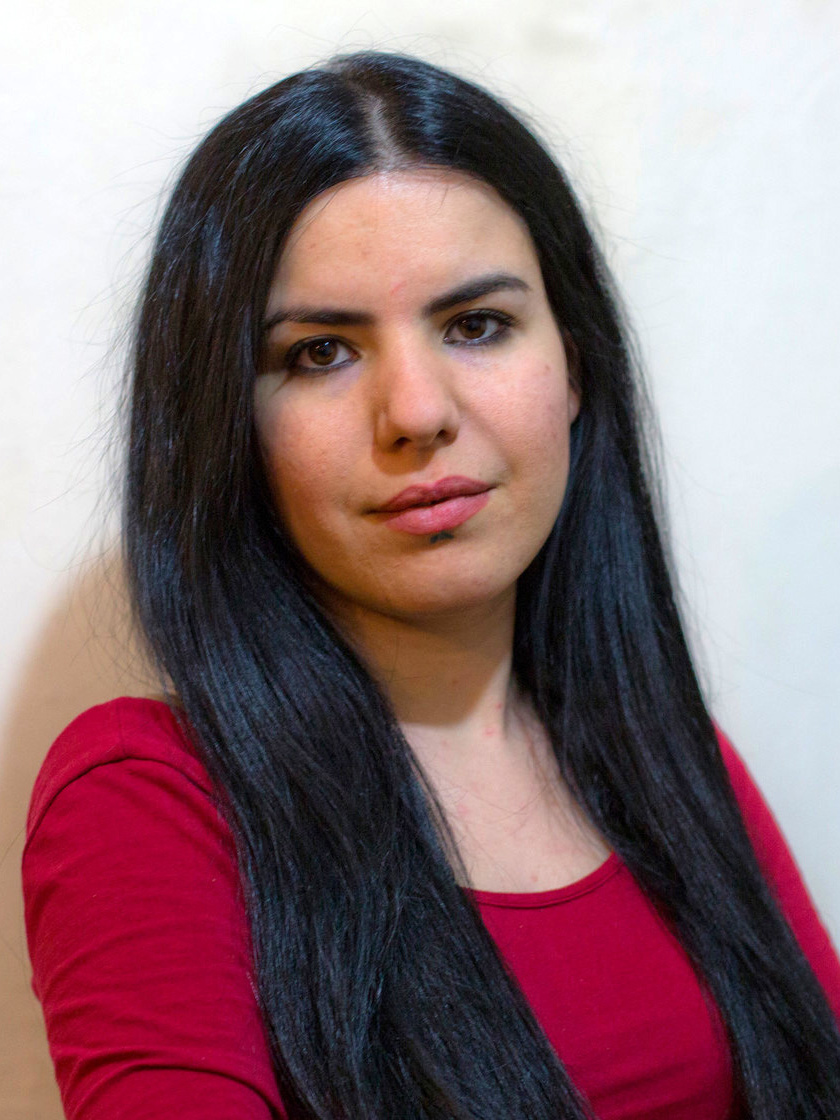
- Doğan in 2016
- Born: 1989 (age 36–37)
- Citizenship: Turkey
- Occupations: Artist, journalist
- Known for: Painting of the destruction of Nusaybin

Zehra Doğan (born 14 April 1989) is a Kurdish artist and journalist and author from Diyarbakır, Turkey. In 2017, she was sentenced to 2 years, 9 months and 22 days in prison for "terrorist propaganda" because of her news coverage, social media posts, and sharing a painting of hers on social media. Her painting depicts the destruction of the Nusaybin, town in southeastern Turkey, after the clashes between state security forces and Kurdish PKK insurgents. After she finished her sentence, she was released from imprisonment from Tarsus Prison on 24 February 2019.

== Career ==
She was a founder and the editor of Jinha, a feminist Kurdish news agency with an all-female staff. Jinha was closed on 29 October 2016 by Turkish authorities, as one of more than 100 media outlets shut down since the failed coup d'état in July 2016. In February 2016, Doğan moved to and began reporting from Nusaybin.

=== Arrest and imprisonment ===
On 21 July 2016, she was detained at a café in Nusaybin and then incarcerated on 23 July in Mardin prison. Her release pending trial was ordered on 9 December of the same year. On 2 March 2017, she was acquitted of the charge of "belonging to an illegal organisation", but was sentenced to 2 years, 9 months and 22 days in jail for her news reporting and posting a painting to social media. She appealed the sentence but it was confirmed and she was arrested on 12 July 2017.

"I was given two years and 10 months [jail time] only because I painted Turkish flags on destroyed buildings. However, they (Turkish government) caused this. I only painted it," Doğan wrote on Twitter following the sentencing.

In prison, she and other women created the newspaper Özgür Gündem Zindan (Free Agenda Dungeon), whose name is a wordplay on Özgür Gündem (Free Agenda), an Istanbul-based publication that catered to Kurdish audiences. One of lawyers was Kamuran Tanhan. Doğa was released from prison in February 2019.

On 19 October 2023, the Court of Cassation ruled on the appeal of Zehra Doğan, who had served a prison sentence for "propaganda in favor of an illegal organization". It declared that the court had made an "error" in assessing the evidence and sentenced Zehra Doğan to a prison term when it should have handed down an acquittal. Following a second trial on 9 May 2024, she was acquitted of all charges relating to "terrorist propaganda" due to the lack of legal basis for these accusations at the conclusion of her retrial.

=== International reaction to the imprisonment ===
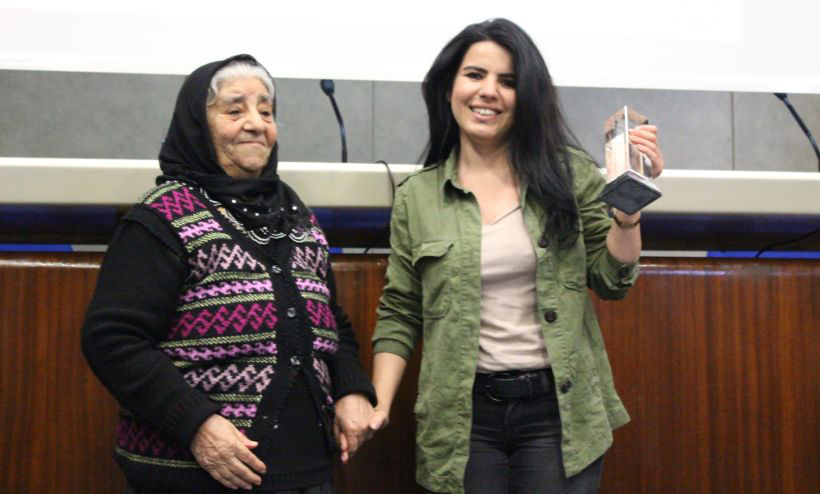
Doğan receiving the Metin Göktepe Journalism Award in 2015

In November 2017, Chinese dissident artist Ai Weiwei published a letter he wrote in solidarity with Doğan's case, drawing parallels between Chinese and Turkish repression of artistic expression. Doğan answers the artist from prison: "Art is the best instrument for the struggle". On 16 March 2018, England-based graffiti artist Banksy unveiled a mural in New York, measuring 21 meters long, showing black tally marks for the days of Doğan's imprisonment, with one set becoming bars behind which Doğan's face looks out from jail. Speaking to The New York Times, Banksy said: "I really feel for her... I've painted things much more worthy of a custodial sentence."

In 2019, Creative Nomads, an Italian production, released a documentary film featuring three women: Terrorist. Zehra and the others. The novelist Aslı Erdoğan and the forensic doctor and human rights defender Şebnem Korur Fincancı are interviewed, Doğan participates by correspondence from the prison, and she is represented by animated sequences voiced by the actress Kasia Smoutniak. The documentary is directed by Marica Casalinuovo, Francesca Nava, Vichie Chinaglia, Marella Bombini.

== Recognition ==
- 2015: Metin Göktepe Journalism Award. The award was for Doğan's work about Yazidi women escaping from ISIS captivity.
- 2017: Freethinker Prize, along with Masih Alinejad, an Iranian journalist.
- 2018, May: "Spring of Press Freedom" prize by Deutscher Journalisten Verbrand (The German Journalists Association)
- 2018, International Women's Media Foundation's Courage in Journalism Award.
- 2018: honorary member of PEN International
- 2019: Exceptional Courage in Journalism Award of the May Chidiac Foundation
- 2020: during the 14th edition of the Festival of Feminine Excellence in Genoa, Italy, she receives the "Hypatia Award for International Feminine Excellence".
- 2020: "Carol Rama Award", Artissima 2020.
- 2020: Power 100 - Most influential people in 2020 in the contemporary artworld.
- 2021: Atomium Awards : Le Soir Prize of the comic strip of reportage 2021, for her graphic novel Prison n°5, published in 2021 by Editions Delcourt.
- 2021: Power 100 - Most influential people in 2021 in the contemporary artworld.
- 2021: "Prison n°5", top list of "The best comics of 2021" by Wired Italy.
- 2021: "Prison n°5", selected in list of 10 best graphic books of the year 2021 by Il Manifesto.
- 2024: ColophonArte Prize was awarded to the artist represented by Prometeo Gallery, Bologna, Italy.

== Exhibitions ==
- 2026, April 17-19, Miart, International modern and contemporary art fair, Milano, Italy.
- 2026 April 11- 26, Reproductions of around twenty pages from Zehra Doğan’s graphic novel Prison No. 5 are being presented for the first time in the charity exhibition Banksy Modeste Collection, at Saint Martin Collegiate Church, in Angers, France; the collection will then continue its tour across Europe.
- 2026, February 5 - 8, Arte Fiera Bologna, Italy.
- 2026, February 5–November 15, “Delcourt Publishing Adventure: 40 Years in the Rhythm of the Ninth Art,” group exhibition, Cité Internationale de la Bande Dessinée et de l'Image (CIBDI), Angoulême, France.
- 2026, February 20 - May 16, Solo exhibition, "I, Witness", curated by Francesca Guerisoli, MACTE - Museum of Contemporary Art in Termoli, Italy.
- 2026, January 23 - March 6, "Intermezzo", group show, Prometeo Gallery, Milano, Italy.
- 2025, October 2 - November 30, "ЯE:IMAGINE: THE RED HOUSE", group exhibition, 7th and final BerlinerHerbstsalon at the Maxim Gorki Theater, Berlin, Germany.
- 2025, 12 July – 30 September, "Light and fight – Luce e lotta nelle opere di Zehra Doğan", Museo d'Arte Contemporanea di Calasetta, Fondazione MACC, Sardegna.
- 2025 June 21–30 September, Pontevedra Art Biennial, Pontevedra, Italy.
- 2025 June 7 – 24 August, "Fragments of Reality. Berlin – Tricity", group exhibition, State Art Gallery, Sopot, Poland.
- 4–6 April 2025, Miart, Milano, Italy.
- November 2024 – January 2025: "Closed Eyes Can See", with Zehra Doğan and Matteo Mauro, Prometeo Gallery, Milano, Italy.
- 12 October 2024 – 5 July 2025: "Figures", a group exhibition featuring works from the Laura and Luigi Giordano collection, SPA, Spazio Per Arte, Ollegio, Italy.
- 2024, 11–13 October: ArtVerona 19th edition, group show, Verona, Italy.
- 2024 July, Art Genève, Switzerland.
- 2024 April, Miart, Milano, Italy.
- 2024, 16 March – 28 September: Biennale Interaction Napoli, "l'Altro e l'Alterità" (the Other and Otherness.) Cloister of Saint Catherine, Napoli, Italia.
- 2024, 13 March – 31 May: Malta Biennale.
- 2024 March, ARCOMadrid, Madrid, Spain.
- 2024, February, Arte Fiera, Bologna, Italy.
- 25 January – 25 February 2024: Meno Parkas, 10 Kurdish artists. Kaunas Pilnas Kultūros, Lithuania.
- 8 October 2023 – 28 January 2024: 49 Nord 6 Est Frac Lorraine, group exhibition "Comment se raconter" (To tell your own story), "Prison n°5", Metz, France.
- 12–15 October 2023, ArtVerona, Verona, Italy.
- 17 May – 2 October 2023: MUCEM group exhibition "Les Maternités de A à Z" (Maternities from A to Z), Marseille, France.
- 2023 April 13–16, Miart, Italy.
- 24 February – 2 April 2023: "Observatory on Deculturalization", organized by the Zaira Oram collective, OXYD Kunsträume, Winterthur, Switzerland.
- 21 February – 4 April 2023: Progetto Genesi (Genesis Project) Itinerant group exhibition. Curator Ilaria Bernardi. Italy.
- 17–19 February 2023, Investec Cape Town Art Fair, Cape Town, South Africa.
- 2–3 February 2023, Arte Fiera, Bologna, Italy.
- 26–29 January 2023, Art Genève, Switzerland.
- November 2022 – March 2023: "Kurdystan - Oblicza trwania", Leon Wyczółkowski District Museum in Bydgoszcz, Poland.
- 21 November 2022: "Paroles, corps et graphies", performance for the opening of the Human Rights Week of the University of Geneva, as part of the festival les Créatives. Geneva, Switzerland.
- November 2022: Artissima Fair 2022. Torino, Italy.
- October 2022: Art Verona, Verona, Italy.
- October 2022: "Blue Freedom", the group exhibition Rojava - Binxet. Curator Barış Seyitvan, as part of the Kurdish Film Festival, Babylon, Berlin Germany.
- September – October 2022: Intemporale, Prometeo Gallery, Milano, Italy.
- 17 July – 25 September 2022: the Museum of Contemporary Art of Calasetta, group exhibition, War is sweet to those who have never experienced it. Fondazione MACC in collaboration with Prometeo Gallery, curated by Efisio Carbone.
- May – September 2022: "Prison n°5", collective exhibition Splendid Isolation. SMAK, City Museum for Contemporary Art, Ghent, Belgium.
- April 2022: "Prison n°5" for the exhibition En la selva eau mucho por hacer. Curated by Maria Barrios. Museo de la Solidaridad Salvador Allende, Santiago, Chili.
- April 2022: "Established" B-13, Fiera Internazionale d'Arte Moderna e Contemporanea, Miart 2022, Milano, Italy.
- April -Juin 2022, Segni di me. Il corpo, un palcoscenico, six artists relate to Carol Rama. Casa Testori, Novate Milanese, Italy. A cura di Rischa Paterlini con Giuseppe Frangi.
- February 2022: Art Basel OVR, Zehra Doğan, "Prison n°5".
- December 2021: Exhibition of "Xwebûn", women artists collective founded by the Academy of Jineology. Kareem Chawshin gallery, Sulaymaniyah, Irak.
- November 2021: Other rooms, other voices, collective, Criminal Police Department Mühleweg, curated by Adam Szymczyk Zurich, Suisse.
- October – November 2021: individual exhibition, Zehra Doğan: Prigione N°5, Prometeo Gallery, Milano, Italy.
- October – November 2021: collective exhibition Fractured Spine. Photobastei, Zurich, Switzerland.
- September 2021: Miart, International Fair of Modern and Contemporary Art, Milano, Italy.
- July 2021: "El grito de la verdad" (The Cry of Truth), Cruce, Madrid.
- June – August 2021: "Stronger Still", Kiosk, Maxim Gorki Theatre, Berlin.
- May – June 2021: Danae revisited, Villa Brandolini, Pieve di Soligo, Italy.
- February 2021: Il tempo delle farfalle / Time of the Butterflies, exhibition dedicated to Patria, Minerva, Teresa Mirabal, curated by Elettra Stamboulis, PAC - Pavilion of Contemporary Art, Milan, Italy (Originally planned for November 2020 - Postponed due to pandemic).
- January 2021 – June 2022: Fashion is a verb: Art Performance and Identity, Willam Peterson University Galleries, NewJersey, USA.
- February 2021, Investec Cape Town Art Fair, Cape Town, South Africa.
- December 2020: Hassas Müdahale, collective exhibition, Kıraathane İstanbul Edebiyat Evi, Istanbul, Turkey.
- December 2020: Art Basel, "OVR: Miami Beach".
- September–October 2020: "Nehatîye Dîtın / Görülmemiştir", Kıraathane İstanbul Edebiyat Evi, Istanbul, Turkey.
- September 2020: Art in Protest by Human Rights Foundation (HRF) Virtual gallery, New York, USA.
- September 2020: Prometeo Gallery, Milan. Italy. Exhibition entitled "Beyond", with a performance.
- September 2020: Palazzi dell'Arte Rimini - PART, Italy. Collective exhibition. Collection of the San Patrignano Foundation.
- September 2020: Barcelona, Spain, La Panera Art Centre, mixed exhibition on censorship, "Línies vermelles. La censura en la col", with the digital work "Nusaybin".
- September 2020: Berlin Biennale, Germany.
- August 2020: Lucca Italia, group show, A volte penso che..., Ex Chiesa di San Matteo, Piazza San Matteo, Lucca.
- On 21 July 2020, Doğan pays homage to the city of Brescia, in Italy, with a large mural artwork for coronavirus resistance. Curated by Elettra Stamboulis
- July 2020: Ravenna Festival, Italy, two performances during the "Roads of Friendship" concerts, with the Kurdish singer Aynur Doğan, the Giovanile Luigi Cherubini Orchestra and the Syrian Expat Philharmonic Orchestra (SEPO) conducted by Riccardo Muti. Curated by Elettra Stamboulis
- June 2020: she begins a wall newspaper project entitled "The Hard Times" with a first issue dedicated to George Floyd, on a wall around Parc Rosa Parks in Paris.
- January 2020: Nassauischer Kunstverein in Wiesbaden, To each Age its art – To Art its Freedom
- January 2020, Peace Forum 2020 in Basel, Switzerland
- December 2019: Middle East Institute (MEI) Art Gallery, Washington, United States. "Speaking Across Mountains: Kurdish Artists in Dialogue".
- November 2019 - March 2020: Santa Giulia Museum, Brescia, Italy, "Avremo anche giorni migliori. Opere dalle carceri turche" as part of the Brescia Peace Festival. Curated by Elettra Stamboulis
- November 2019: Galerie de l'Espace des femmes – Editions des femmes, Paris, France "Œuvres évadées"
- November 2019: Drawing Center, New York, United States "The Pencil is a Key - Drawings by Incarcerated Artists"
- May 2019: Tate Modern, London, Great-Britain, installation titled "Ê Li Dû Man" (What is left behind)
- March 2019: Rennes Opera House, France, exhibition titled "Eyes wide open" (Les yeux grands ouverts)
- December 2018: "Kurdish Art Fair" 2nd edition, London, United Kingdom
- January 2018: Tour Saint Aubin in Angers, France, exhibition titled "Les yeux grands ouverts" (Eyes wide open)
- September 2018: Pays de Morlaix, France "Festival des Autres Mondes" (Festival of the Other Worlds)
- August 2017: Festival de cinéma de Douarnenez, France, exhibition titled "Les yeux grands ouverts" (Eyes wide open)
- February 2017: Diyarbakir, Turkey, exhibition titled "141".

== Bibliography ==
- Hölle Nr.5, Limited Edition, for the 7th Berlin Autumn Salon 2025, at the Maxim Gorki Theater, Berlin. Edited by Zehra Doğan & Naz Öke. ISBN 978-3-00-084033-3
- Priggioni n°5 appears in La Repubblica's newsstand collection, "Mondo Graphic Novel", dedicated to the 20 national and international graphic novels deemed most representative of the 21st century, in June 2023.
- Zehra Doğan, Wir werden auch schöne Tage sehen. Briefe aus dem Gefängnis. Spector Books, February 2022. ISBN 978-3-95905-569-7
- Zehra Doğan, Avremo anche noi dei bei giorni, Fandango, February 2022. ISBN 978-88-6044-812-5
- Zehra. La ragazza che dipingeva la guerra (Zehra. The girl who painted the war), by Antonella De Biasi, illustred by Zehra Doğan, Mondadori, 8 July 2021, ISBN 978-88-04-74044-5
- Zehra Doğan, Prigione N°5, graphic novel. Becco Giallo, Avril 2021. ISBN 978-2-84975-489-4
- Zehra Doğan, Prison N°5, graphic novel, Delcourt, translated/adapted by Naz Oke, Daniel Fleury, March 2021. ISBN 978-2-413-03848-1
- Zehra Doğan, Avremo anche giorni migliori. Opere dalle carceri turche (We shall also know better days. Works from Turkish prisons) by Elettra Stamboulis, Art Catalogue, Skira Publishing, ISBN 88-572-4330-3
- Zehra Doğan, Nous aurons aussi de beaux jours : écrits de prison (We shall also know better days: prison writings), translated by Naz Oke, Daniel Fleury, Editions des femmes, October 2019, ISBN 978-2-84975-489-4
- Zehra Doğan, Les Yeux grands ouverts (Eyes Wide Open). translated by Naz Oke, Fage Editions, July 2017 ISBN 978-2-84975-489-4
