= Finnish Comics Society =

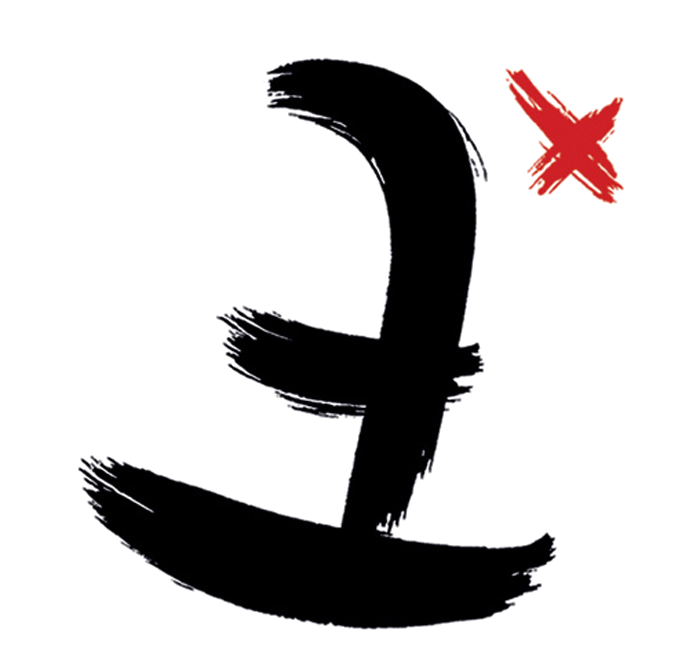
Finnish Comics Society's logo

The Finnish Comics Society (Finnish: Suomen Sarjakuvaseura ry) is the umbrella organization for the cartoon industry in Finland. It was founded in 1971. Its purpose is to increase the appreciation for comics, to promote the knowledge of good comics and increase comics critical reading. The Finnish Comics Society supports comic artists and collaborates with the Finnish cartoonists association.

The most visible parts of the operation are the annual Helsinki Comics Festival, Sarjainfo magazine, Puupää's Hat award (Puupäähattu) since 1972, Comics Center in Helsinki and the Finnish Comics Annual anthology. They also run multiple Finnish online services around comics like kvaak.fi, sarjakuvablogit.com and 24tuntiasarjakuvaa.info. Finnish Comics Society has also a collection of a variety of comics which can be borrowed with permission.

The Society's logo is a stylization of Pekka Puupää's hat.
