= Francesca Mannocchi =

Italian journalist and author (born 1981)

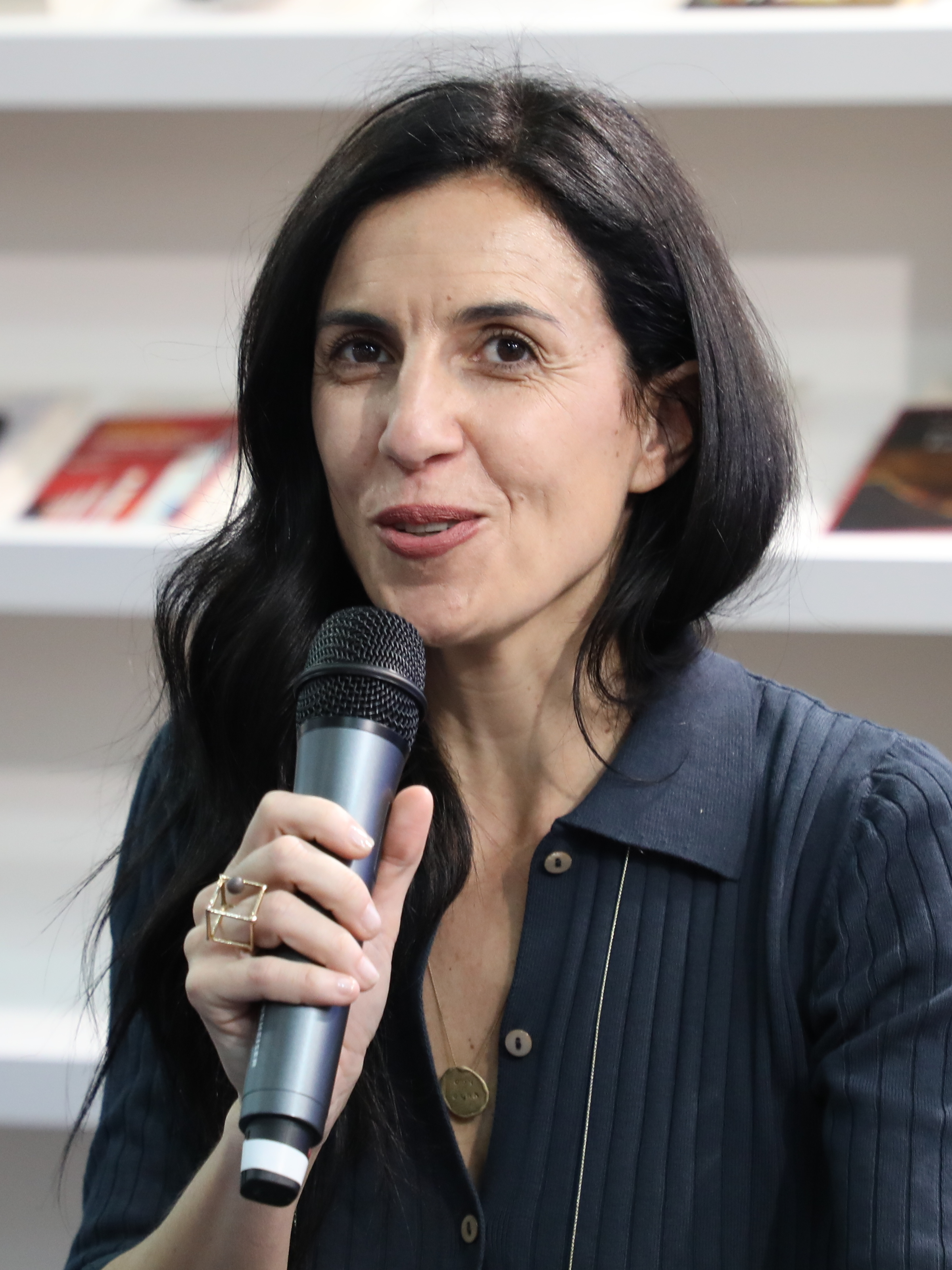
- Mannocchi at the 2024 Turin International Book Fair
- Born: 1 October 1981 (age 44); Rome, Italy
- Occupation: Writer

Francesca Mannocchi (born 1 October 1981) is an Italian journalist and writer.

== Biography ==
Mannocchi worked as a freelancer and collaborated with various television channels and newspapers, both Italian, such as L'Espresso and La7 and international, for example Al Jazeera and The Guardian, dealing with migrations and conflicts concerning mainly the countries of the Arab League and Turkey.

She won several awards, including the 2016 Premiolino, the Premio Rizzi per il Giornalismo, and the 2022 European Award for Investigative and Judicial Journalism.

In 2018, along with photographer Alessio Romenzi, Mannocchi co-wrote and co-directed the documentary Isis, Tomorrow. The Lost Souls of Mosul, which premiered at the 75th Venice Film Festival. In 2019, she published her debut novel, Io Khaled vendo uomini e sono innocente (Einaudi), the story of a trafficker of human beings, earning the Premio Estense. That same year, she described the conflicts in the Middle East in Porti ciascuno la sua colpa (Laterza) and published Libia (Mondadori), a work of graphic journalism illustrated by Gianluca Costantini.

In 2021, Mannocchi published her sophomore novel Bianco è il colore del danno (Einaudi). In 2022, she carried off the Flaiano Award for Journalism and published Lo sguardo oltre il confine (DeAgostini), where Mannocchi for the first time narrates the current conflicts addressing the younger audiences. Since 2022, she has been sent to La7 for the Russian invasion of Ukraine.

== Books ==
- Se chiudo gli occhi..., con illustrazioni di Diala Brisly, Roma, Round Robin Editrice, 2019, ISBN 978-88-94-95319-0
- Io Khaled vendo uomini e sono innocente, Torino, Einaudi, 2019. ISBN 88-062-4090-0
- Porti ciascuno la sua colpa: Cronache dalle guerre dei nostri tempi, Roma, Editori Laterza, 2019, ISBN 978-88-58-13402-3
- Libia, con illustrazioni di Gianluca Costantini, Milano, Arnoldo Mondadori Editore, 2019, ISBN 88-047-0553-1
- Bianco è il colore del danno, Torino, Einaudi, 2021, ISBN 88-062-4717-4
- Lo sguardo oltre il confine, Milano, De Agostini, 2022, ISBN 979-12-21-20118-5

== Personal life ==
She is engaged to photojournalist Alessio Romenzi, with whom she presented the documentary Isis, Tomorrow. Lost Souls of Mosul, at the 75th Venice International Film Festival.

She has multiple sclerosis.
