= Elettra Stamboulis =

Italian writer and educator

Elettra Stamboulis (born December 31, 1969) is an Italian art curator and writer. She was the art director of Komikazen festival in Ravenna. She has written graphic novels including Piccola Gerusalemme, Cena con Gramsci and Arrivederci Berlinguer. She is currently the principal of Liceo Artistico e Musicale Antonio Canova in Forlì.

She has curated personal exhibitions of Joe Sacco, Marjane Satrapi, Aleksandar Zograf, among others and she curated the first personal exhibition in a public museum of Zehra Doğan in Brescia in 2019. And Badiucao's first solo exhibition in 2021 in Brescia as well. She is the founder of InguineMAH!gazine, and Geographical Institute of Unconventional Drawings Arts (G.I.U.D.A.). She has written for various magazines including Linus, Fumettologica, Efimerida ton Syntakton and Artribune.

== Early life and education ==
Born to Greek political exiled, she grew up in Ravenna. She studied at Università di Roma La Sapienza and she has a degree in Classical Philology. She attended a two years course for Conservator and Curator, and she worked as translator from Italian and Modern Greek. She started her interest in political and reality based comics in 2001, staging Joe Sacco's exhibition in Ravenna Clouds from beyond the borders.

== Career ==
The year after she curated, in association with Stripburger, the collective exhibition Perventiquattromilabaci, which presented the alternative comics scene in the Former Yugoslavia and in the Balkans. In 2003 she curated one of the few exhibition with the original artworks of Persepolis by Marjane Satrapi, who travelled across Italy. She was in the meanwhile also the art curator of the Young Artists selection in her area. In 2006 she presented the collective exhibition and catalogue dedicated to the Turkish comics magazine Le Man, which was travelling as well in Italy and abroad. In 2007 she curated the collective exhibition dedicated to Lebanese comics scene Cedars in comics: in that exhibition where for the first time presented in a curatorial form to a European audience authors such as Mazen Kerbaj, Lena Meraj, Barrack Rima and Zeina Abirached. In 2011 she curated Egypt without pyramids, about the work of Magdy El Shafee and Pino Creanza.

In 2012 she prepared the Mediterranean Biennale in Ancona organizing and curating Arrivals and Departures - Mediterranean inviting artists such as Adelita Husni Bey, Almudena Lobera, Dor Guez, Mary Zigoury, Zoulikha Bouaddellah. She dedicated to comics writing in the following years, publishing with Becco Giallo a trilogy about left leaders in the XX century in Italy, focusing on Antonio Gramsci, Sandro Pertini and Enrico Berlinguer.

She opens in collaboration with Gianluca Costantini, who is also her husband, the gallery Mirada who was active from 2004 until 2015 in Ravenna.

From 2008 to 2011 she was the City Councillor for Education in the city of Ravenna.

In 2014 she curated the last edition of Komikazen Festival in Ravenna, 99% dedicated to art workers and their rights: 99 drawers were called to participate in an open action in the local museum, they were asked to frame their works and install them. The idea was to show how art workers are not considered workers like others and they are asked to do themselves even installation without a fee. During the opening 99 pizza were served by riders, always in terms of collective action.

In 2017 and 2019 she curated the young artists Biennale in Ravenna RAM the first one dedicated to 1977 and the second to Gender, Code and Languages in MAR.

She was then invited to contribute to collective catalogue like the one dedicated to Corto Maltese in 2019 by Comicon Festival in Naples and she started to collaborate with the Sicilian publisher Mesogea, with whom she started the project Cartographic.

In 2019 she curated the solo exhibition of Zehra Doğan in Brescia Avremo anche giorni migliori, which has a huge audience in Italy and then she curated her live performance in Ravenna Festival, during the concert of Friendship of maestro Riccardo Muti in 2020 in Ravenna and Paestum. In November 2020 she also curated the project The time of Butterflies: dedicated to the sisters Mirabal in PAC of Milan with works of Zehra Doğan.

== Bibliography ==
- Il velo di Maja: Marjane Satrapi ovvero dell'ironia dell'Iran, Lizard edizioni, Roma 2003
- La Turchia ride, Catalogue La Turchia ride (Mirada Cultural Association, Ancona, 2007)
- Guadalajara serà la tumba del Fascismo, Edicion de Ponent, Barcellona 2007, curated with Felipe H. Cava.
- Cartesio e il fumetto, Komikazen International Reality Comics Festival (Edizioni del Vento, Jesolo Lido, 2007, ISBN 9788889890066)
- Dionysus in Iraq in "Daily Iraq", Bergamo, Libri Aparte, 2009
- Esorcismo mediante disegno di Elettra Stamboulis. Testo in "Porto dei santi", Roma, Purple Press, 2009
- The obsessive normality of being special, Komikazen International Reality Comics Festival (Giuda Editions, Ravenna, 2012, ISBN 9788897980063)
- Graphic Novels aus Italien – ein Schlaglicht Graphic Novel dall'Italia – un fanale, in Horizonte — Neue Serie • Nuova Serie, Italianistische Zeitschrift für Kulturwissenschaft und Gegenwartsliteratur • Rivista d'Italianistica e di letteratura contemporanea, ISSN: 2510-1684, Ausgabe 4, 2019
- Guarire dall'accecamento. L'autodafé di Gianluca Costantini allo Steri di Palermo, in Dialoghi Mediterranei, n.32, luglio 2018, Periodico bimestrale dell'Istituto Euroarabo di Mazara del Vallo, ISSN 2384-9010.
- Il Graphic Journalism in Italia Analisi del giornalismo disegnato in un Paese a sovranità disinformata, in Pagine Inattuali, n. 7, maggio 2017. ISSN 2280-4110
- Raccontare la storia a fumetti, in Storia e problemi contemporanei, n. 44 a XX, gennaio – aprile 2007 pagg. 169 – 178 ISBN 9788849128505
- Le città in fumo: rappresentazione e immaginario nei fumetti della Ex Yugoslavia: intervento al seminario internazionale Le città divise: I Balcani e la cittadinanza tra nazionalismo e cosmopolitismo. (nell'ambito del 3° Master internazionale in "Progettazione e Gestione delle attività di Cooperazione e di Formazione per l'Europa centro-orientale e Balcanica", organizzato sotto l'egida dell'UNESCO dalle Università degli Studi di Padova e Trieste e dall'Istituto Internazionale Jacques Maritain) Atti del convegno. Infinito edizioni, Roma 2005. ISBN 9788889602041
- L'isola del tesoro, in Un viaggio straordinario. Corto Maltese, catalogo della mostra al MAN di Napoli, 25 aprile – 9 settembre 2019, Comicon edizioni, Napoli, 2019, pp. 92 – 108.
- Cosa rimane degli Ottoni, in Imperituro. Renovatio imperii. Ravenna in Ottonian Europe, edited by Maria Pia Guermandi – Silvia Urbini. pp. 214 – 219, IBC Emilia Romagna, Bologna 2014 ISBN 978-88-97281-35-1
- Across the lane. Nerosunero (Mario Sughi). Testo in catalogo. Giuda edizioni, Ravenna 2014
- Komikazen 99%, 9^{o} Festival internazionale del fumetto di realtà, Giuda edizioni, Ravenna 2014.
- Ram: Trasumanar e organizzar, Giuda edizioni, Ravenna 2013 curatela e testo in catalogo.
- RAM Facciamo un '77, catalogo della mostra al MAR di Ravenna (dal 1 settembre 2017 – 17 settembre 2017), Giuda edizioni, 2017, Ravenna
- Komikazen, 8° Festival internazionale del fumetto di realtà, curatela e testo in catalogo edizione 2012, Giuda edizioni, Ravenna 2012
- Beirutopia: Randa Mirza. Giuda edizioni, Ravenna 2012.
- Cuori così bianchi. Un immaginario dialogo tra Javier Marìas e sua figlia, in e bianca. Una parola diversa per dire latte, 8 dicembre 2012 – 20 gennaio 2013, testo in catalogo.
- Egitto senza piramidi, curatela e testo in catalogo per la mostra nell'ambito di Adriatico Mediterraneo 2011 ad Ancona, Giuda edizioni, Ravenna 2011.
- Avremo anche giorni migliori. Zehra Doğan, catalogo della mostra al Museo di S. Giulia, Brescia dal 15 novembre al 6 gennaio 2020, Skirà editore, Milano 2019

== Curating of cultural events ==
- Joe Sacco Clouds from beyond the borders, MAR Museo d'arte della città, Ravenna, 2002, Catalog
- The Veil of Maya Marjane Satrapi, Santa Maria delle Croci, Ravenna, 2003, Catalog
- Komikazen International Reality Comics Festival, Ravenna, 2006–2015
- Kape Kape, Center of the Arts Parko Elefterias, Athens, 2006
- La Turchia ride, Artists: Ramize Erer, Mehmet Çagçag, Tuncay Akgün and Guneri Icoclu Adriatico-Mediterraneo Festival, Mole Vanvitelliana, Ancona, 2007, Catalog
- Arrivi e partenze. Mediterraneo, Mole Antonelliana, Ancona, 2012, Catalog
- Randa Mirza, Beirutopia, Galleria Quattrocentrometriquadri, Ravenna, 2012
- Frammenti estetici del tradimento, curated by Elettra Stamboulis and Gianluca Costantini, Mirada Art Gallery, Ravenna, 2013
- RAM Pedagogia dello sguardo, ottava biennale dei giovani artisti della Romagna, MAR Museo d'arte della Città, Ravenna, 2015
- Imperituro. Renovatio Imperii. Ravenna nell'Europa Ottoniana, Classense Library, Ravenna, 2015
- RAM Facciamo un '77, nona biennale dei giovani artisti della Romagna, Mar Museo d'arte della Città, 2017

== Publications ==
=== Graphic novels ===
==== Italy ====
- L'ammaestratore di Istanbul, (drawings by Gianluca Costantini) Comma 22, Bologna, 2008
- Officina del macello, (drawings by Gianluca Costantini) Edizioni del Vento, Jesolo Lido, 2009
- Cena con Gramsci, (drawings by Gianluca Costantini) BeccoGiallo, Padua, 2012
- L'ammaestratore di Istanbul, (drawings by Gianluca Costantini) Giuda Edizioni, Ravenna, 2013
- Arrivederci Berlinguer, (drawings by Gianluca Costantini) BeccoGiallo, Padua, 2013
- The turtle Tamer of Istanbul, (drawings by Gianluca Costantini) VandA.epublishing, Milan, 2013 – Ebook
- Pertini fra le nuvole, (drawing by Gianluca Costantini) BeccoGiallo, Padua, 2014
- Officina del macello, (drawings by Gianluca Costantini) Eris Edizioni, Turin, 2014
- Diario segreto di Pasolini, (drawings by Gianluca Costantini) BeccoGiallo, Padua, 2015
- Piccola Gerusalemme, (drawings by Angelo Mennillo) Mesogea edizioni, Messina 2018. Con una introduzione di Moni Ovadia.
- Zodiac, (drawings by Gianluca Costantini) Ten Speed Graphic, 2024

==== France ====
- Petite Jérusalem, (drawings by Angelo Mennillo) Rackham, Paris, 2018

==== Greece ====
- Little Jerusalem – Μικρή Ιερουσαλήμ (Drawings by Angelo Mennillo) Jemmapress, Thessaloniki, 2015

==== Turkey ====
- Little Jerusalem – Küçük Kudüs-Selanik (Drawings by Angelo Mennillo) Εκδόσεις ιστός // istos yayın, Istanbul, 2017

=== Magazines ===
==== England ====
- Ctrl.Alt.Shift Unmasks Corruption, Yes we camp (drawings by Gianluca Costantini), curated by Paul Gravett, London, 2010

==== France ====
- Le Monde Diplomatique, The story of Sheikh Mansour and other myths from Caucaso, (drawings by Gianluca Costantini) Homecooking Books, Paris, 2010

==== Greece ====
- Babel, n°237, Gaz Promise (drawings by Gianluca Costantini), Athens, 2006

==== Turkey ====
- LeMan, n°1229, Who's Who (drawings by Gianluca Costantini), Istanbul, 2015
- LeMan, n°1224, Selahattin Demirtaş (drawings by Gianluca Costantini), Istanbul, 2015
- LeMan, n°1211, Dateci LeMan (drawings by Gianluca Costantini), Istanbul, 2015

==== United States ====
- World War 3 Illustrated, n°37, Gaz Promise (drawing Gianluca Costantini), New York, 2006

=== Web Publications ===
- Words Without Borders, an Endless Green Line (drawing Gianluca Costantini), 2007 Link
