= Helsinki Comics Festival =

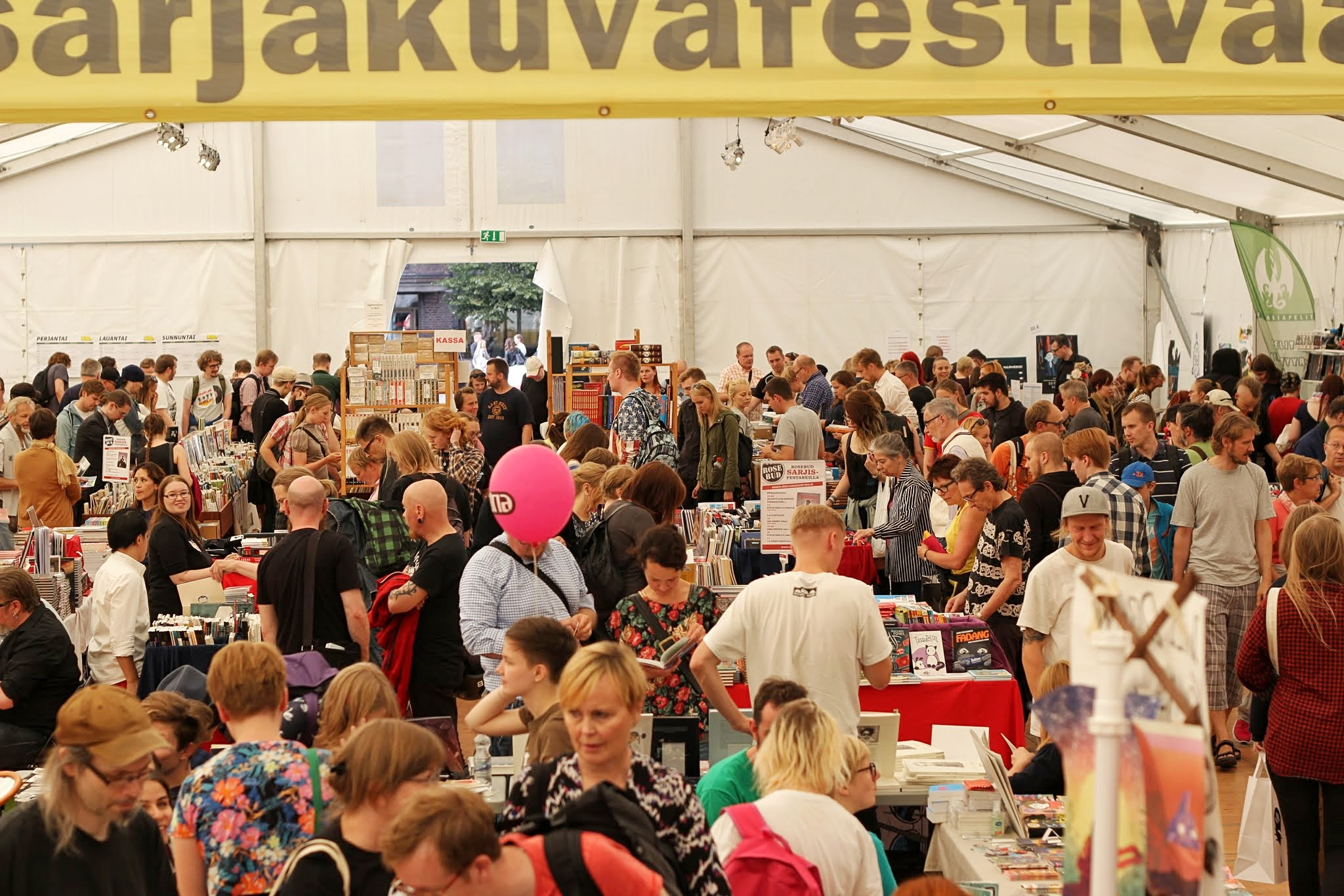
- Helsinki Comics Festival. Picture by Jussi Pakkanen.
- Status: Active
- Genre: Comics
- Venue: Suvilahti
- Location: Helsinki
- Country: Finland
- Inaugurated: 1979
- Organizer: Finnish Comics Society
- Website: sarjakuvafestivaalit.fi

Helsinki Comics Festival is an annual free cultural event in Helsinki, Finland. It has become the largest comics event in North-Europe. The festival is typically held in early September.

The festival has been organized by the Finnish Comics Society since 1979. Activities include a comic market, exhibitions throughout the city, public discussion, presentations, comic guests, competitions, and children's activities. The festival also gives space for many self-published works and zines to be presented to the public.
