= Ciril Horjak =

Slovene artist and illustrator

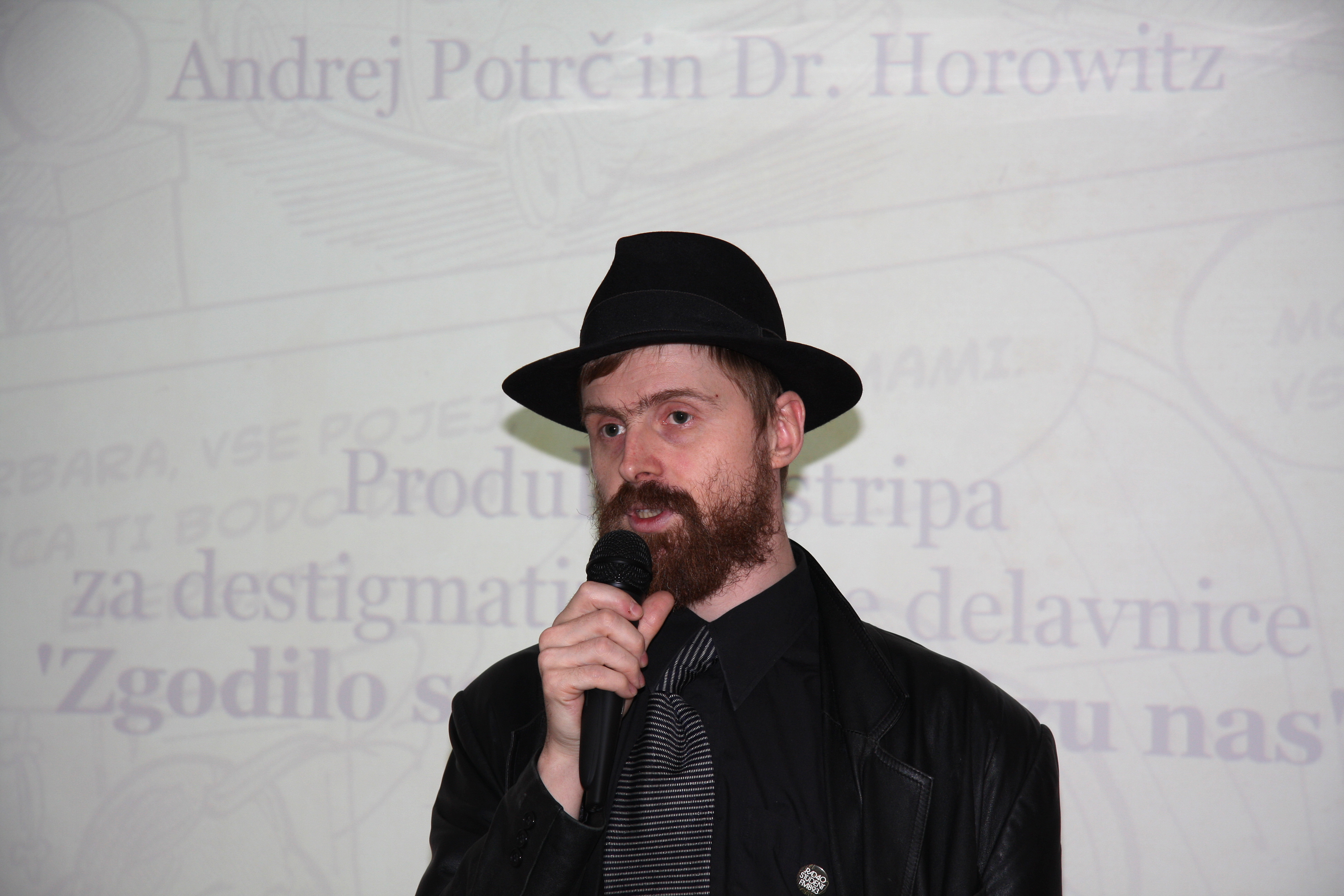
- Ciril Horjak in 2009
- Born: December 1975 (age 50); Slovenia
- Known for: drawing, illustrating
- Notable work: comic books, illustrations, caricatures

Ciril Horjak (alias Dr Horowitz; born December 1975, in Slovenj Gradec) is a Slovene comic book artist and book and newspaper illustrator. His comics have been published in Stripburger, in Quadrado from Portugal, in Shtumm from Germany and Le Martien from France. His editorial illustrations have been published in Večer Newspaper (Slovenia), Guardian (UK), Le Monde (FR), Chicago Tribune (USA) and others.

== Life and work ==
He studied at the Academy of Fine Arts and Design and works as a freelance illustrator. He has provided more than 1200 illustrations for the Večer newspaper since 2007. In 2017, he authored the visual side of the Luther-Trubar app about Primož Trubar, the founder of the Slovenian language, and German Reformation, published by the Goethe Institute. He is the author of the very first educational comic book ever to be dedicated to endodontics.

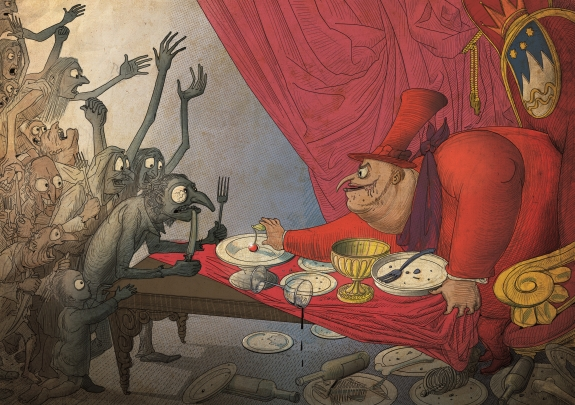
Allegory of a rich man, taking the last cherry, poor people watch angrily.

== Awards ==
- In 2016, he received an award by the Society of Slovenian Journalists.
- In 2010, he received an award by the Slovenian Institute for Adult Education.
