= Angoulême International Comics Festival =

French comics convention

Coordinates: 45.6°N 0.16°E

Angoulême International Comics Festival Festival international de la bande dessinée d'Angoulême
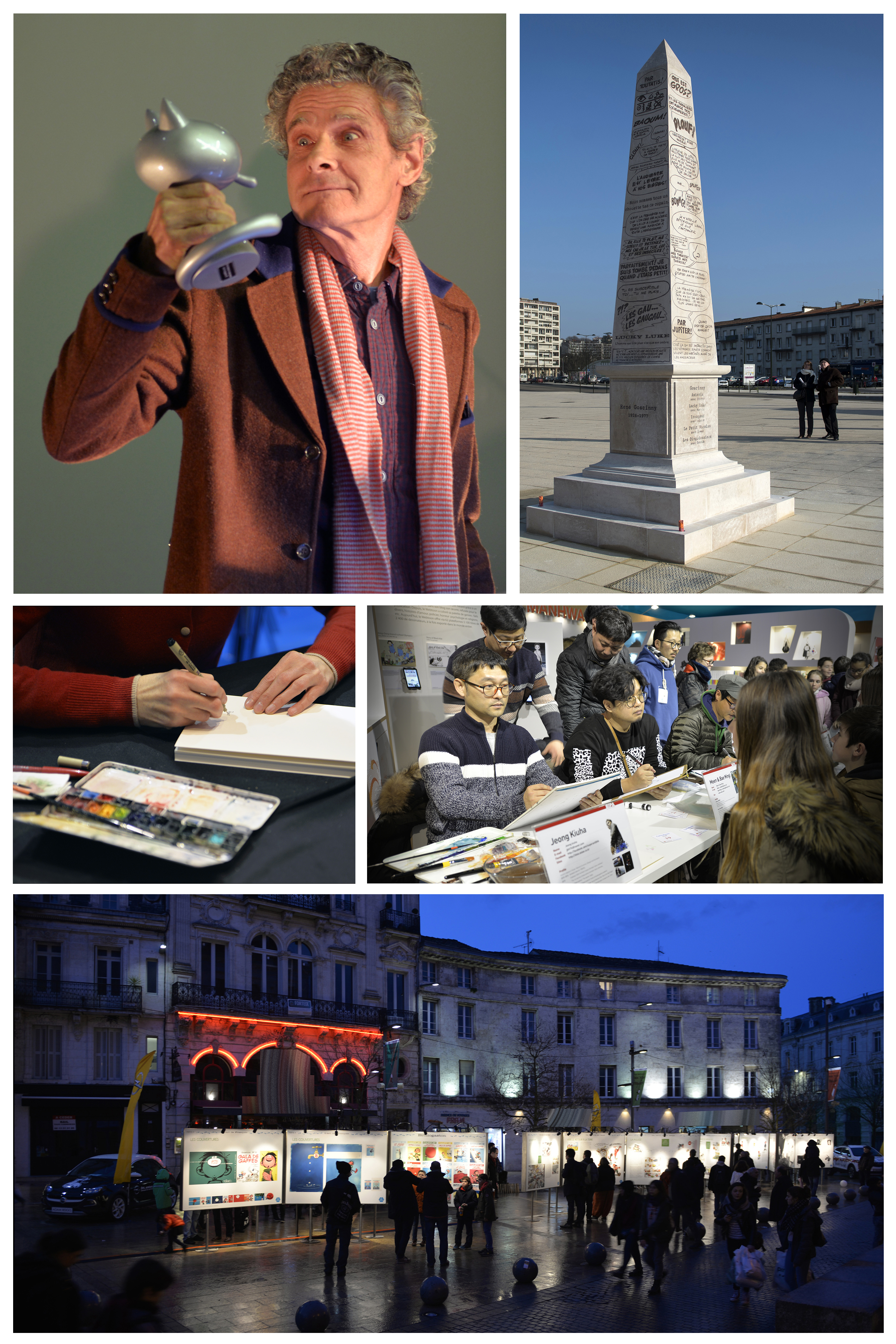
- Pictures from 44th Angoulême festival in 2017
- Status: Active
- Genre: Comics
- Date: Late January
- Frequency: Annual
- Location: Angoulême
- Country: France
- Years active: 1974–present
- Inaugurated: 1974
- Founder: Francis Groux, Jean Mardikian, Claude Moliterni
- Attendance: Around 200,000 on average and more than 220,000 in 2012
- Leader: Franck Bondoux
- Organizer: 9eART+ Société Organisatrice du Festival
- Website: BDAngouleme.com

The Angoulême International Comics Festival (AICF; French: Festival international de la bande dessinée d'Angoulême, FIBD), held in Angoulême, France, is the second largest comics festival in Europe after the Lucca Comics & Games of Italy, and the third biggest in the world after Lucca and the Comiket of Japan. It has occurred every year since 1974, on the last weekend of January; the 2026 edition was cancelled amidst an artists' boycott to the festival organizer 9emeArt+, accused of mismanagement.

== History ==
The Angoulême International Comics Festival was founded by French writers and editors Francis Groux and Jean Mardikian, and comics writer and scholar Claude Moliterni. Moliterni served as co-organizer of the festival through 2005.

== Attendance ==
Over 200,000 visitors attend the fair every year, including between 6,000 and 7,000 professionals including approximately 2500 authors and 800 journalists.

The attendance is generally difficult to estimate because the festival takes place all over town, and is divided in many different areas that are not connected to each other directly.

== Official prizes ==
The four-day festival is notable for awarding several prestigious prizes in cartooning. The awards at Angoulême were originally called the Alfred awards, after the pet auk from Zig et Puce by Alain Saint-Ogan. In 1989, the name changed to the Alph-art awards, honoring the final, unfinished Tintin album by Hergé. In 2003, the Alph-art name was dropped, and they are now simply called "The Official Awards of the International Comics Festival" (le Palmarès Officiel du Festival international de la bande dessinée). In 2007, Lewis Trondheim (2006 Grand Prix winner) created a mascot for the festival, Le Fauve (The Wildcat), and since 2008 the prize winners have received wildcat statuettes, with the Best Album statuette coated in gold. Since this year, the award is called the fauve and the best album, the fauve d'or. The prizes were reorganized too, to create a pool of 40-60 albums, called "official selections", from which are awarded the "Best Album" prize, five "Angoulême Essentials", one "Revelation Essential" (given to rookie creators), and one Essential chosen by the public. The Heritage Essential (for reprinted material) and Youth Essential are selected from separate nominee pools.

Additionally, the Grand Prix de la ville d'Angoulême is awarded each year to a living creator honoring their lifetime achievement, and the Grand Prix winner becomes president of the next year's festival. Traditionally, the president heads the prize jury of the next year's festival, illustrates the festival poster, and is given an exhibition of his or her work. Four women have been awarded the prize: French author Florence Cestac, Japanese mangaka Rumiko Takahashi, Canadian Julie Doucet, and British cartoonist Posy Simmonds.

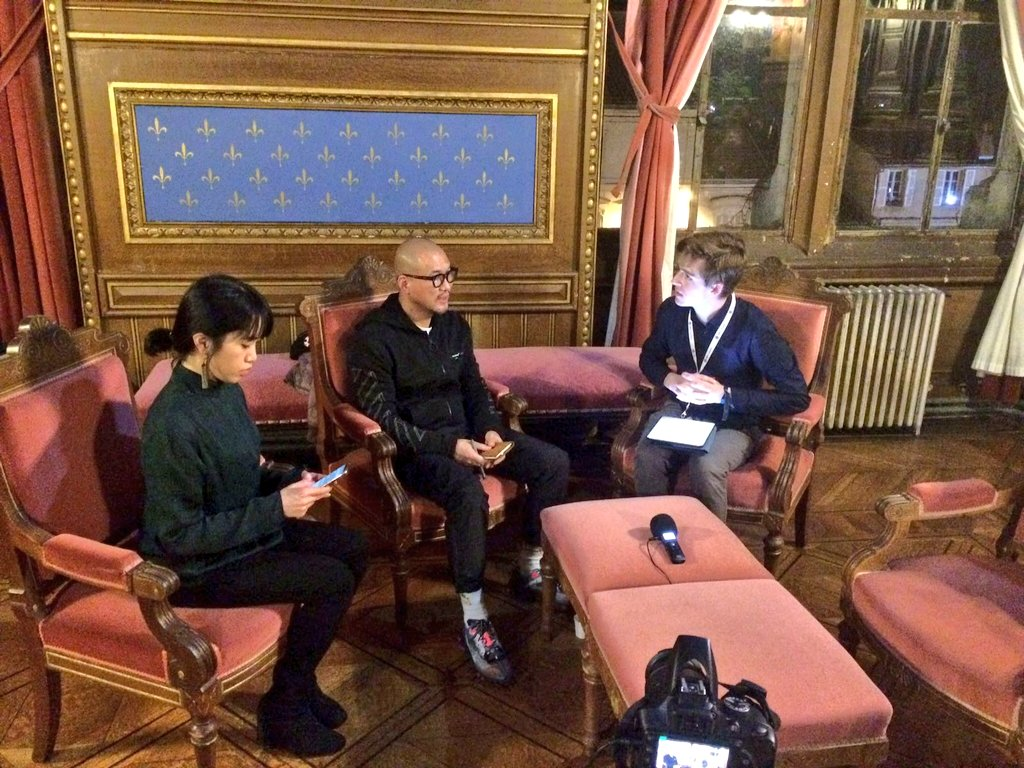
Artist Kim Jung Gi in interview with Yann Blake in Angoulême during the festival (January 2019)

== Other prizes ==
- Prize for School Comic
- Prize for Young Talent (Prix Jeunes Talents)
- Prize for Young Talent from the Aquitaine Region
- "Strip" Prize
- Prize of the Students of Poitou-Charentes (secondary school)
- Prize of the Students of Angoulême (primary school)
- Prize for Alternative Comics (fanzines)
- Hippocampus Prize (for creators with disabilities)
- Other prizes have been created on the margins of the festival, known as the Off Of Off. These awards are the Prix Tournesol, the Shlingo Award and the Prix Couilles-au-cul, literally translated as the "Balls to the buttocks" award, deriving from the French slang expression for bravery, and who celebrates and encourages artistic freedom in artists whose activism is repressed in their home countries.

== Prize categories ==
- Grand Prize
- Prize for Best Album/Golden Wildcat
- Special Prize of the Jury
- Prize for Artwork
- Prize for First Comic Book
- Prize for a Series
- Prize for Inheritance
- Prix Jeunesse 9-12 ans (Youth prize, 9–12 years)
- Prix Jeunesse 7-8 ans (Youth prize, 7–8 years)
- Fanzine Prize
- Revelation Prize
- Best promotional comic
- René Goscinny award

== See also ==
- European comics
