= Ignatz Award for Outstanding Anthology =

US comics and cartooning award

- Awarded for: Outstanding achievements in comics and cartooning by small press creators or creator-owned projects published by larger publishers
- Location: Bethesda, Maryland
- Country: United States
- Presented by: Ignatz Award Committee
- Hosted by: Small Press Expo
- First award: 2017
- Website: www.smallpressexpo.com/ignatz-awards

The Ignatz Award for Outstanding Anthology, established in 2017 as part of the Ignatz Awards, is an annual award for outstanding achievements in comics and cartooning by small press creators or creator-owned projects published by larger publishers. The award for outstanding anthologies "recognizes a book or other collection of selected writings by various writers usually in the same literary form, of the same period, or on the same subject".

== Recipients ==
Award winners and finalists
Year	Editor(s)	Title	Result	Ref.
2017	Taneka Stotts	Elements: Fire – An Anthology by Creators of Color (Note: After winning, Stotts arranged to have her Ignatz Award smashed with a sledgehammer, and the shards individually mounted onto separate wooden bases with engraved nameplates, so that she could give a piece of the award to each of the contributors to her anthology.)	Winner	
2017	Jon Macy and Tara Madison Avery	ALPHABET: The LGBTQAIU Creators from Prism Comics	Finalist	
2017	Hanhah K. Chapman	Comic Book Slumber Party's Deep Space Canine	Finalist	
2017	Joamette Gil	POWER & MAGIC: The Queer Witch Comics Anthology	Finalist	
2017	Javier Olivares and Santiago Garcia	Spanish Fever: Stories by the New Spanish Cartoonists	Finalist	
2018	Hazel Newlevant, Whit Taylor, and Ø.K. Fox	Comics for Choice	Winner	
2018	J.T. Yost	Bottoms Up, Tales of Hitting Rock Bottom	Finalist	
2018	Alexander Rothmans, Paul K. Tunis, and Alexey Sokolin	Ink Brick #8	Finalist	
2018	Kat Fajardo and Pablo Castro	La Raza Anthology: Unidos y Fuertes	Finalist	
2018	Mickey Zacchilli	Lovers Only	Finalist	
2019	Tara Avery and Jeanne Thornton	We're Still Here: An All-Trans Comics Anthology	Winner	
2019	Matt Bors, Mattie Lubchansky, and Eleri Harris	Death – The Nib Magazine	Finalist	
2019	Der-shing Helmer	Electrum	Finalist	
2019	Matt Bors, Mattie Lubchansky, and Eleri Harris	Family – The Nib Magazine	Finalist	
2019	Allison O'Toole	Wayward Sisters	Finalist	
2020	The Nib	Be Gay, Do Comics	Winner	
2020	Zora Gilbert and Cat Parra	Dates III	Finalist	
2020	Ronald Wimberly and Joshua O'Neill	LAAB Magazine #4	Finalist	
2020	Sage Coffey	Sweaty Palms Volume 2	Finalist	
2020	Tommi Musturi	The Anthology of Mind	Finalist	
2021		Glaeolia 2	Winner	
2021	Casper Cendre	A Queer Prisoner's Anthology IV	Finalist	
2021	Kadak Collective	Bystander	Finalist	
2021	A.B.O. Comix	Confined Before Covid: A Pandemic Anthology by LGBTQ Prisoners	Finalist	
2021	Xinmei Liu	First Wave: Comics from the Early Months of China's Outbreak	Finalist	
2022	Michael Sweater and Benji Nate	Good Boy Magazine #1	Winner	
2022	Dave Schilter and Sanita Muižniece	Baltic Comics Magazine š! #42 'Scientific Facts'	Finalist	
2022	Tana Oshima	Isolated: A Pandemic Comics Anthology	Finalist	
2022	Ronald Wimberly and Joshua O'Neill	LAAB Magazine #2	Finalist	
2022	Andrea Purcell	Smut Peddler Presents: Sordid Past	Finalist	
2023	Allison O'Toole and Ashanti Fortson	Shades of Fear	Winner	
2023	Andrew Alexander	Cram Comics Issue #1	Finalist	
2023	Emuh Ruh	Glaeolia 3	Finalist	
2023	Katherine Foyle	Home: A Comics Anthology on Belonging in Ireland Today	Finalist	
2023	Eric Reynolds	NOW #12	Finalist	
2024	Jenn Woodall, Jon Iñaki, Jonathan Rotsztain, Mitch Lohmeier, and Paterson Hodgson	Pulping	Winner	
2024	Cassandra Jones	Let Her Be Evil	Finalist	
2024	Viktor T. Kerney and William O. Tyler	We Belong: The All-Black, All-LGBTQ+ Sci-Fi and Fantasy Comics Anthology	Finalist	
2024	Lucio Luiz	Wheels on the Bus	Finalist	
2024	Trina Robbins	Won't Back Down: An Anthology of Pro-Choice Comics	Finalist	
2025	Sean Knickerbocker	Rust Belt Review vol. 6	Winner	
2025	Rafael Grampá and Janaína de Luna (ed.)	Braba: A Brazilian Comics Anthology	Finalist	
2025	Will Dennis and Sean Edgar (ed.)	Come Find Me	Finalist	
2025	Sunmi and Mar Julia (ed.)	Datura Magazine vol. 3	Finalist	
2025	Brett Israel	Loud: Stories to Make Your Voice Heard	Finalist	
2026	Ronald Wimberly (ed.)	LAAB: A Comics Anthology No. 3	Winner	
2026	Casper Cendre, Oliver Mills, and Brett Thomas Gonzalez (ed.)	A Queer Prisoner’s Anthology Vol. 9: Beautiful Regrets	Finalist	
2026	Marc Jackson (ed.)	Goof #2	Finalist	
2026	Samandal (ed.)	Revenge #2	Finalist	
2026	Jonathan Bayliss	So Buttons #15	Finalist	

== Writers with multiple nominations ==
The following writers have received two or more nominations:

Two

- Matt Bors (Note: Matt Bors, Mattie Lubchansky, and Eleri Harris were jointly nominated twice.)
- Casper Cendre
- Mattie Lubchansky
- Eleri Harris
- Allison O'Toole
- Ronald Wimberly
