= Be Gay, Do Comics =

2020 comic anthology by The Nib

- Date: September 1, 2020
- Page count: 250 pages
- Publisher: IDW Publishing

Creative team
- Creator: The Nib
- ISBN: 978-1-68405-777-1

Be Gay, Do Comics is a 2020 comic anthology by The Nib. It consists of several comics from multiple creators relating to LGBTQ+ identity, culture, and history, in a wide range of art styles, subject matter, and tones. It is titled after the phrase "Be Gay, Do Crime".

== Development ==
The book was funded on Kickstarter starting November 2019.

== Contributions ==
- Introduction by Mattie Lubchansky
- The Final Reveal by Joey Alison Sayers
- Gender Bent by Kendra Wells
- Brands Love Pride by Mattie Lubchansky
- Eight Queens by Sasha Velour
- Astrological Signs as Classic Queer Haircuts by Shelby Criswell
- The Life of Gad Beck: Gay. Jewish. Nazi Fighter. by Levi Hastings and Dorian Alexander
- Puerto Rico's LGBT Community is Ready to Kick the Door Down by Rosa Colón Guerra
- I Came Out Late in Life and That's Okay by Benjamin A. Wilgus
- Queer Uprisings Before Stonewall by Hazel Newlevant
- Visibility Has Its Rewards by Binglin Hu, Scout Tran, Mattie Lubchansky, Sage Coffey, Dylan Edwards and Sfé R. Monster
- The Undercut by Shing Yin Khor
- How Do You Translate Non-Binary by Breena Nuñez
- Queerativity! by Taneka Stotts and Ria Martinez
- Seeing Others by Delta Vasquez
- Queerness Has Always Been Part of Life in the Middle East by Anonymous
- Dancing with Pride by Maia Kobabe
- Gender Isn't Binary and Neither is Anatomy by Sarah Mirk and Archie Bongiovanni
- Pronoun Panic by Kendra Wells
- Just Another Day at the Newspaper by Mattie Lubchansky
- I'd be an Okay Mom by Joey Alison Sayers
- Just a Joke: Where Alt-Right Guys Get Their Start by Sage Coffey
- The Dream of a Gay Separatist Town by Archie Bongiovanni
- Am I Queer Enough? by Jason Michaels and Mady G
- Freedom, Joy and Power: The History of the Rainbow Flag by Max Dlabick
- Birth Control is About More than Just Birth by Alex Graudins
- Dating a Trans Person Changed my Partner's Life by Mady G
- Decolonizing Queerness in the Philippines by Trinidad Escobar
- When You're Invisible in Pop Culture by Bianca Xunise and Sage Coffey
- Nothing is Wrong With Me by Dylan Edwards
- Off the Rack by Mattie Lubchansky
- Great Moments in Pride History by Kendra Wells
- The Trans Discourse Minefield by Joey Alison Sayers
- A Covert Gaze at Conservative Gays by Sam Wallman
- The Homophobic Hysteria of the Lavender Scare by Kazimir Lee and Dorian Alexander
- Boobs Aren't Binary by Mady G
- How Do You Adopt an Embryo by Robyn Jordan
- LiveJournal Made Me Gay by JB Brager
- Sometimes I Call Myself Queer. Sometimes I Feel Like a Liar by Nero O'Reilly
- A Lifetime of Coming Out by Joey Alison Sayers
- I Am More Than My Chromosomes by Elísabet Rún
- Jussie Smollett Doesn't Negate the Reality of Hate Crimes by Mariah-Rose Marie
- It's All for the Breast by Alexis Sudgen
- Witch Camp by Melanie Gillman
- Take a Hint by Julia Bernhard
- The American Revolution's Greatest Leader Was Openly Gay by Josh Trujillo and Levi Hastings
- What's It Like to Raise Kids in Malaysia When You're LGBT? by Kazimir Lee
- The Wonderfully Queer World of Moomin by Mady G
- Judge Not by Joey Alison Sayers
- The Important Pundit in: Silent Horror by Mattie Lubchansky

== Reception ==
Both Kirkus Reviews and School Library Journal gave the book starred reviews. Kirkus Reviews commented on the variety of art style, lengths, and tone, and concluded that it was an "utterly delightful and expansive collection of queer voices and truths."

Publishers Weekly dubbed the book "an overall invigorating sampler of the current queer cartooning scene", but felt that certain comics were not well-translated into a print format.

Andy Oliver of Broken Frontier stated "it's [the] mix of the uplifting and the sobering, the triumphant and the devastating, the thoughtful and the cutting, that ensures Be Gay, Do Comics is such a powerful, informative and educative exploration of LGBTQIA experiences."

CBR called it "enjoyable for both queer individuals and allies alike" and said it "celebrates the LGBTQ community and its history with entertaining, educating, and heartfelt stories of the queer experience."

=== Accolades ===
Awards and honors
Year	Award	Category	Result	Ref.
2021	Ignatz Award	Outstanding Anthology	Won	
2021	Ringo Award	Best Anthology	Won	
2020	Graphic Novels & Comics Round Table	Best Graphic Novels for Adults	Top Ten	
2020	School Library Journal	Best Graphic Novel	Honoree	

== External ==
Listing on Queer Comics Database with links to comics on The Nib's website
