= Lucio Luiz =

Brazilian journalist, editor and comic book writer

- Lucio Luiz
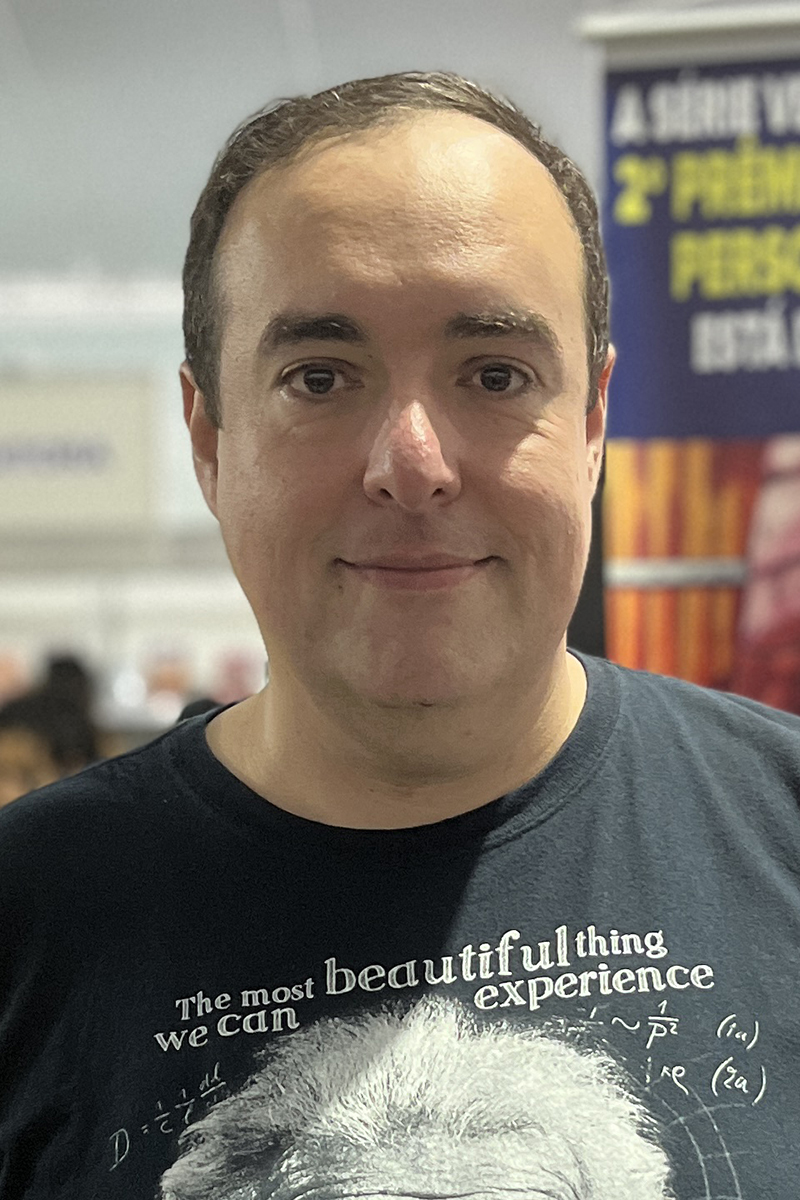
- Born: Lucio Luiz Corrêa da Silva; July 14, 1978; Rio de Janeiro
- Education: Universidade Gama Filho, Estácio de Sá University
- Occupations: Journalist, publisher, comics writer, podcaster, author, arbiter
- Employers: Colégio Gonçalves Dias (1999–2018); Marsupial Editora (2012–); Papo de Gordo (2008–)
- Notable work: Meninos e Dragões
- Spouse: Priscila Regina da Silva
- Awards: Prêmio Angelo Agostini for Best Release (Meninos e Dragões, 2014); Prêmio Abril de Personagens (Meninos e Dragões, 2012)
- Website: lucioluiz.com.br

Lucio Luiz (born July 14, 1978 in Rio de Janeiro) is a Brazilian journalist, writer, editor, researcher, podcaster, and comics author. He holds a degree in Journalism and a PhD in Education. He is the co-creator of the comic book series Meninos e Dragões, founder of The Independent publisher Marsupial, and a member of the podcast Papo de Gordo.

== Personal life ==
Lucio Luiz was born in Rio de Janeiro on July 14, 1978, but has lived in Nova Iguaçu, a city in the metropolitan region of Rio, since he was a child.

He graduated in Journalism in 1998 from Gama Filho University. Between 2007 and 2009, Lucio took a master's degree in Education at Estácio de Sá University, developing a dissertation on the impact of the creation of fan fiction by teachers and students in relation to school written production and digital literacy.

In 2013 Lucio founded the independent publishing house Marsupial Editora, focused on books in the areas of Education, Communication and Technology. The following year, he created the Jupati Books imprint, intended for the publication of comics, being responsible for editing several collections and graphic novels.

In 2018 Lucio completed his Doctorate in Education at Estácio de Sá University, defending a thesis on the perception of Basic education teachers on the use of comics in the classroom. In 2021 this thesis was published in the book Professores Protagonistas: os quadrinhos em sala de aula na visão dos docentes (Protagonist Teachers: comics in the classroom in the view of educators).

In 2024 he took on the role of editorial coordinator of the newly created publishing house of the Association of Researchers in Sequential Art (Associação de Pesquisadores em Arte Sequencial, ASPAS), an institution of which he was already a member of the board.

== Career ==
=== Early writings ===
Lucio was responsible for the fan site Lobo Brasil, which he maintained between 1997 and 2008 about the DC Comics comic book character Lobo, and in which he regularly published articles, reviews and news, in addition to having interviewed comic artists who worked with the character, such as Alan Grant and Todd Nauck.

In 2002 Lucio independently published the book of poems Amor, Escatologia e Etcetera.

Also from 2002 Lucio started writing fan fiction (mainly about the characters Lobo and Fire, from DC Comics) on the Hyperfan website, then one of the main Brazilian websites dedicated to fanfics. In 2006, already as editor-in-chief of the site, he organized the book Hyperfan: cinco anos de fanfic (Hyperfan: five years of fanfic) in honor of the site's anniversary, which brought unpublished stories created by its members, as well as illustrations by the comics artist JJ Marreiro.

The short stories were set in a new fictional universe, created by the authors, in which ordinary people gain superpowers thanks to a mysterious phenomenon. This book is considered the first Brazilian fiction book dedicated to the superhero genre. In addition to being responsible for editing and organizing the book, Lucio wrote the humorous short story "Super tia" (Super aunt), about a kindergarten teacher who began to mentally control her students with tragicomic results.

After his 2002 poetry book, Lucio has also written children's books such as A Mamãe Tamanduá, with illustrations by PriWi, and Palavras, Palabras, with illustrations by Bianca Pinheiro.

=== Research ===
As soon as he began his master's degree in 2007, Lucio began to regularly publish academic research at various conferences in the areas of communication and education, and he was also one of the first Brazilian researchers to study and write academic articles on participatory culture.

At that time, there was not yet a consecrated translation in Brazil for the term "participatory culture", with Lucio suggesting the use of "cultura participatória" as it is closer to the original intention of Henry Jenkins, creator of the term. However, as more research was carried out, the translation "cultura participativa" ended up becoming the most used in Portuguese.

In 2013 Lucio organized the book Os Quadrinhos na Era Digital: HQtrônicas, webcomics e cultura participativa (Comics in the Digital Age: "comictronics", webcomics and participatory culture), which featured texts, among others, by researchers Octavio Aragão, Edgar Franco, Roberto Elísio dos Santos, Henrique Magalhães, and Paulo Ramos, in addition to Lucio himself. This book was nominated for the Troféu HQ Mix for Best Theoretical Book in 2014.

The following year he organized the book Reflexões Sobre o Podcast, the first book on the subject in Portuguese, which featured podcasters such as Luciano Pires and Pedro Duarte, among others. In 2023 the book was adapted for audio in podcast format.

On May 10, 2023, Lucio launched the independent website Quadrinhopédia, a database with information about artists, writers, editors and other people linked to Brazilian comics. The project took four years to develop, with 850 entries published at its launch and regular additions of new biographies and expansions of existing ones.

=== Podcast ===
In 2008 Lucio began participating as a regular member of the podcast Papo de Gordo, which he co-founded. The biweekly program on health and behavior became one of the most popular Brazilian podcasts between the late 2000s and early 2010s.

In addition to being a participant in the Papo de Gordo podcast and editor of the website of the same name, where he wrote the humor column "Gordo de raiz" and was one of those responsible for the journalistic texts, Lucio also created, in 2009, the comic strip As Aventuras do MorsaMan with Flavio Soares, who was also a member of the podcast. The comic presented short stories of the character MorsaMan, the website's "mascot".

In 2011 Lucio was also one of the authors of the book Papo de Gordo: o blog que virou livro, released by the publisher Blogbooks (an imprint of Singular Digital, a company in the Ediouro group), which featured a collection of articles and news published by Papo de Gordo as a result of the website's victory in the "Universo masculino" category of the second edition of the Blogbooks Awards.

=== Comics ===
==== 2009–2014: Comics writer ====
Lucio debuted as a comics writer in 2009, with the webcomic As Aventuras do MorsaMan, illustrated by Flavio Soares. The stories were published regularly until 2010 on the website Papo de Gordo and, in 2023, were published in a printed collection that also included some unpublished stories.

In 2012, again in co-authorship with Flavio, Lucio created the children's comic book series Meninos & Dragões, which won the 2nd Prêmio Abril de Personagens (Abril Characters Award) and was released as a regular comic book by Editora Abril the following year.

But due to the crisis that Editora Abril was going through at the time, which was resulting in several cuts in publications, especially comics, the comic book was canceled after the publication of the first issue. Still, the comic won the Prêmio Angelo Agostini for Best Release in 2014.

Also in 2014, Lucio published comics in collections such as Feitiço da Vila, with stories inspired by the songs of Noel Rosa (he wrote two stories, illustrated respectively by Mario Cau and Lu Cafaggi), and Café Espacial No. 13, with a story drawn by Flavio Soares, among other works.

==== 2015–2021: Comics editor ====
As of 2015 Lucio began to work almost exclusively as a comic book editor for the Jupati Books imprint (which had been created the previous year), having edited works such as Pétalas (by Gustavo Borges and Cris Peter, in 2015), Pieces: partes do todo (by Mario Cau, in 2016) and Olimpo Tropical (by André Diniz and Laudo Ferreira, in 2017), among many others.

He was also responsible for the Brazilian editions of graphic novels such as The Sculptor (by Scott McCloud, in 2015), Ruins (by Peter Kuper, in 2016) and Barbarella: Les Colères du mange-minutes (by Jean-Claude Forest, in 2017, a work never published in Brazil until then).

Lucio only returned to writing a comic book in 2018, when he and Flavio relaunched the Meninos e Dragões series, which was re-released in the format of albums with unique stories and with the characters' look completely reformulated. The first volume was nominated for the Troféu HQ Mix for Best Children's Publication the following year.

In addition to his work as an editor, Lucio was a juror for the 2020 Prêmio Jabuti in the "Comic Book" category, alongside Germana Viana and Marcelo D'Salete. The judges were chosen by the award's Board of Curators after a public consultation.

==== 2022-presen: New authorial comics ====
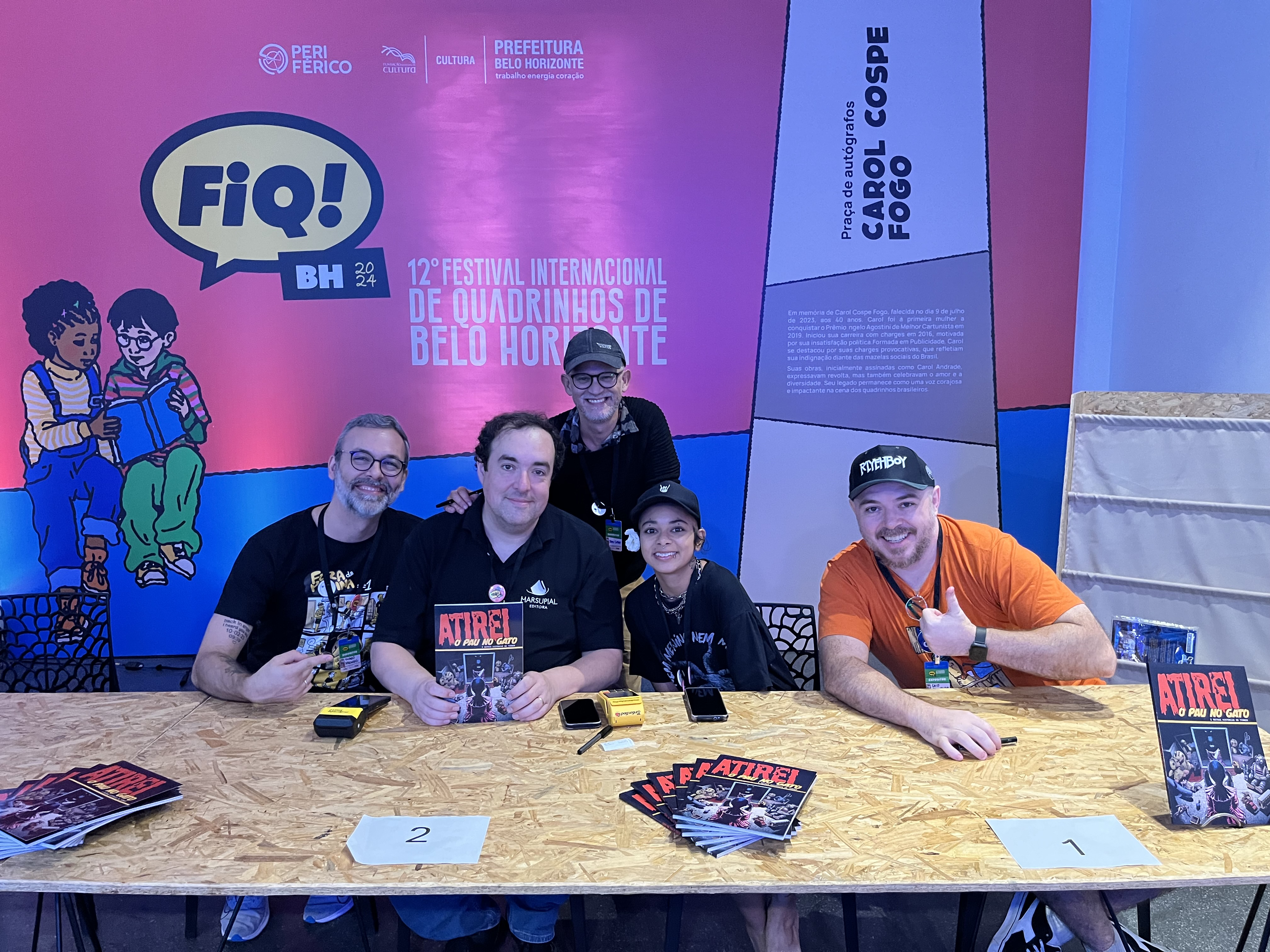
Book signing session for Atirei o Pau no Gato e Outras Histórias de Terror in 2024 Festival Internacional de Quadrinhos. From left to right: Thiago Krening, Lucio Luiz, Wagner Willian, Little Goat and Caio Oliveira.

In July 2022 Lucio published on the platform Webtoon the webcomic 4th Wall Brawl, written by him and with pencils by Flávio Luiz, ink by Flavio Soares and colors by Will Rez and Marco Pelandra. The following year, he released its printed version in Portuguese, with the title Quebra-Quebra da Quarta Parede. The comic was printed continuously, maintaining the vertical webtoon format and measuring 8 centimeters wide by 5 meters high.

In 2023 Lucio simultaneously released in Portuguese and English the comic book Atirei o Pau no Gato e Outras Histórias de Terror, with 15 stories written by him and, each one, with a different artist, including Laudo Ferreira, Mario Cau, Luiza Lemos and Wagner Willian, among others.

The stories transformed classic children's songs (such as If You're Happy and Five Little Ducks, among others) into horror tales. The English version, titled The Wheels on the Bus and Other Horror Stories, was nominated for the 2024 Ignatz Award.

== Awards and nominations ==
Year	Award	Category	Work	Result	Ref
2012	Prêmio Abril de Personagens		Meninos & Dragões	Won	
2014	Prêmio Angelo Agostini	Best Release	Meninos & Dragões	Won	
2014	Troféu HQ Mix	Best Theoretical Book	Os Quadrinhos na Era Digital	Nominated	
2019	Troféu HQ Mix	Best Children's Publication	Meninos e Dragões volume 1	Nominated	
2024	Ignatz Awards	Outstanding Anthology	The Wheels on the Bus and Other Horror Stories	Nominated	
2024	Prêmio Aberst de Literatura	Best crime or horror story	Atirei o Pau no Gato e Outras Histórias de Terror	Nominated	
2024	Troféu HQ Mix	Best adaptarion	Atirei o Pau no Gato e Outras Histórias de Terror	Nominated	
2024	Prêmio Angelo Agostini	Best release	Atirei o Pau no Gato e Outras Histórias de Terror	Nominated	
2024	Prêmio Angelo Agostini	Best writer	Atirei o Pau no Gato e Outras Histórias de Terror; Quebra-Quebra da Quarta Parede; As Aventuras do MorsaMan	Nominated	
