= Lillo Parra =

Brazilian comics artist

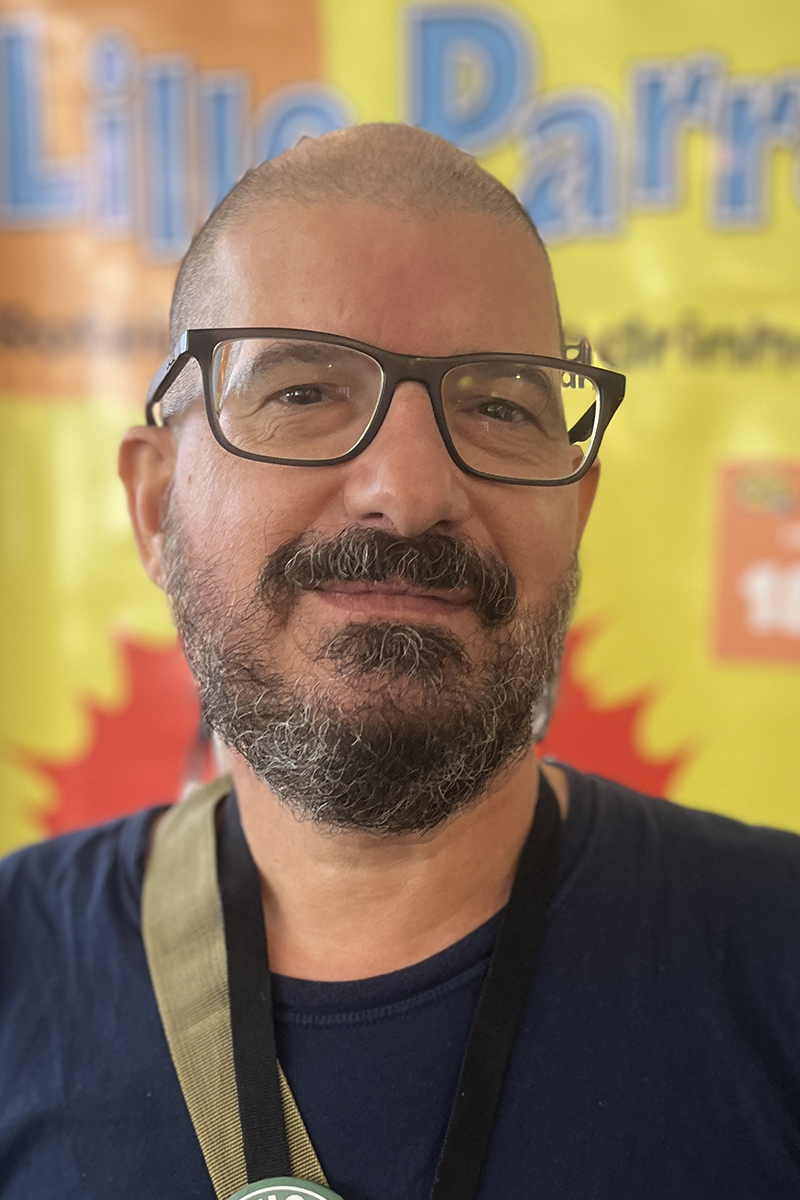
Image of Lillo Parra

Lillo Parra (born 1972 in São Paulo) is a Brazilian theatre director and comics artist.

Parra has worked as a director at the theatre collective Teatro Popular União e Olho Vivo.

In 2011, he wrote his first comic book script, an adaptation of William Shakespeare's A Midsummer Night's Dream. Subsequently, he published comic books based on the Shakespeare plays The Tempest and Macbeth. His graphic novel La Dansarina, with art by Jefferson Costa, was published in 2015.

He founded the publishing house Trem Fantasma together with Guido Moraes, Sérgio Barreto and Lucas Pimenta, in 2020.

== Awards ==
In 2016, Parra won the Troféu HQ Mix, the main Brazilian comic book award, for Best Writer and Best National Special Edition (for the graphic novel La Dansarina).

== Bibliography ==
- Coleção Shakespeare em Quadrinhos nº 2 (Nemo, 2011) - art by Wanderson de Souza
- Coleção Shakespeare em Quadrinhos nº 4 (Nemo, 2012) - art by Jefferson Costa
- As Aventuras do Capitão Nemo: O Navio Fantasma! (Nemo, 2013) - art by Will Sideralman
- Máquina Zero nº 1 (Quadro a Quadro, 2013) - "Apenas um segundo", art by Will Sideralman
- Café Espacial nº 13 (independente, 2013) - "Esta noite, no parque...", art by Mario Cau
- Quatro Estações (independente, 2013) - "Verão: amor de verão não sobre a serra", art by Jackson Oliveira
- Gibi Quântico nº 1 (Quanta Academia de Arte, 2014) - "Hora do chá", art by Tiago Silva
- Descobrindo um Novo Mundo (Nemo, 2015) - art by Akira Sanoki and Rogê Antônio
- La Dansarina (Quadro a Quadro, 2015) - art by Jefferson Costa
- Fome dos Mortos (Draco, 2017) - "Anhangá", art by Val Deir Rocha
- Mestres do Terror nº 67 (Ink & Blood Comics, 2017) - "Anya, a filha de Drácula", art by Laudo Ferreira Jr.
- Mestres do Terror nº 68 (Ink & Blood Comics, 2018) - "Levando doces para a vovózinha", art by Laudo Ferreira Jr.
- Mestres do Terror nº 69 (Ink & Blood Comics, 2018) - "Sua pequena Niedja", art by Laudo Ferreira Jr. / "Meio passional", art by Chris Ciuffi
- Undeadman: edição especial (Quadrinhópole, 2018) - "No teatro", art by Gico
- Frankestein 200 (Sebo Clepsidra, 2019) - "O raio, o sol, suspende a lua", art by PriWi
- Mestres do Terror nº 70 (Ink & Blood Comics, 2019) - "O lobisomem de Marapuporã", art by Flavio Soares
- O Cramulhão e o Desencarnado (independente, 2019) - art by Gilmar Machado
- Mestres do Terror nº 72 (Ink & Blood Comics, 2020) - "Encontro de família", art by Laudo Ferreira Jr.
- Mestres do Terror nº 73 (Ink & Blood Comics, 2020) - "Curtindo a night!", art by Will Sideralman
- Mestres do Terror nº 75 (Ink & Blood Comics, 2021) - "Esse cara", art by Laudo Ferreira Jr.
- Mestres do Terror nº 76 (Ink & Blood Comics, 2021) - "Jingobéu", art by Laudo Ferreira Jr.
- O Corcunda de Notre Dame (Principis, 2021) - art by Samuel Bono
