= Cartoon Movement =

Online platform for cartoons and comics

- Company type: Private company, Foundation
- Industry: Online media
- Founded: 2010
- Headquarters: The Hague, Netherlands
- Key people: Thomas Loudon (Founder and CEO); Arend Jan van den Beld (Founder and CEO)
- Website: cartoonmovement.com

Cartoon Movement is a business that offers a global online platform for editorial cartoons and comics journalism. Based in The Hague, Netherlands, Cartoon Movement receives between 60 and 100 cartoons each day from over 220 freelance cartoonists in over 80 countries. Submitted works are often purchased by corporate media publications.

== History ==
Cartoon Movement began in 2010 when VJ Movement founders Thomas Loudon and Arend Jan van den Beld began working with editorial cartoonist Tjeerd Royaards to promote the political cartoon as a fundamental style of journalism and to support freedom of the press and the rights of editorial cartoonists.

An early project at Cartoon Movement was a cartoon series by Royaards, Matt Bors, and others on conditions in Haiti after the 2010 Haiti earthquake. The work was underwritten by a grant from the Dutch government.

The Occupy movement was another early project, and Cartoon Movement received editorial cartoons from Occupy sources around the world.

Cartoon Movement supports Cartoonists Rights Network, International and human rights education in schools.

== See also ==
- List of cartoonists
- List of editorial cartoonists
- Caricature
- Comics Studies
