= Lucy Bellwood =

American cartoonist and illustrator (born 1989)

- Bellwood in 2019
- Born: Lucy Bellwood; 1989 (age 36–37)
- Notable works: Baggywrinkles: A Lubber’s Guide to Life at Sea (2016); Seacritters! The Hunt for the Jigamaree (forthcoming 2027)

Lucy Bellwood (born 1989) is an American cartoonist and illustrator known for her comics about tall ships and impostor syndrome, as well as her transparency about the economics of being a freelance artist.

== Career ==
Her long-form work includes 100 Demon Dialogues, Baggywrinkles, the illustrations for How to Invent Everything by Ryan North, and the forthcoming Seacritters! (with writer Kate Milford). Other illustrations and shorter comics have been published by Google AI and in BuzzFeed and The Nib.

100 Demon Dialogues began in 2017 as Bellwood's project for a 100-day creative challenge. She posted entries online throughout the process, gaining a following that appreciated the universal nature of her inner critic, which she rendered in the comics as a small demon. Following the project's online success, Bellwood compiled the 100 comics into a book, published in 2018.

Bellwood is also known for her transparency in discussing the financial realities of freelancing. She has published specifics of her income and expenses, spoken publicly about being on food stamps while being perceived as a successful artist, written about the effects of artwork going viral online, and discussed precarity and the central role of social media in a freelance artist's life.

== Personal life ==
Bellwood is from Ojai, California. She attended Reed College and is a member of the Portland, Oregon studio Helioscope.

== Bibliography ==
=== Books as cartoonist ===
- Baggywrinkles: A Lubber's Guide to Life at Sea (self-published, 2016)
- 100 Demon Dialogues (self-published, 2018)
- Seacritters! The Hunt for the Jigamaree (forthcoming, 2027), with writer Kate Milford

=== Books as illustrator ===
- How to Invent Everything: A Survival Guide for the Stranded Time Traveler (2018) by Ryan North (Riverhead Books)
- Tell the Turning (2021) by Tara K. Shepersky (Bored Wolves)
- Serpentine (2023) by Tara K. Shepersky (Bored Wolves)

=== Select comics and illustrations ===
- "Secret Life of Gitmo's Women" (2014), co-written with Sarah Mirk
- "Flip the Switch" (2014), on floating in a sensory deprivation tank
- "Down to the Seas Again" (2014)
- "Definitely-Not-Filthy Sailing Terminology" (2015)
- "Dance Yourself Clean" (2015), on social dance
- "The Ornithology of the American Lesbian" (2015)
- "A Week Aboard the SSV Oliver Hazard Perry" (2016)
- "Mappin' the Floor: A Scientific High-Seas Adventure" (2017)
- "What Does Wonder Woman Actually Represent?" (2017)
- "Federated Learning" (2019) for Google AI, co-written with Scott McCloud, on the machine learning technique
- "Who's Being Left Out?" (2021), on voter disenfranchisement in Oregon
- "The Scale of a Man" in Drawn to the Sea: Maritime Stories From Savannah (2026), in collaboration with the Ships of the Sea Maritime Museum
