= Archie Bongiovanni =

American queer and trans cartoonist and illustrator

Archie Bongiovanni is an American queer and trans cartoonist and illustrator.

== Biography ==
Bongiovanni grew up in Fairbanks, Alaska. They (Note: Bongiovanni uses the pronouns they/them.) grew up reading comics and wanting to be a comic artist. They earned a Bachelor of Fine Arts from Minneapolis College of Art and Design in 2009. In 2020, they participated in the Tin House Summer Workshop.

Their book The Quick and Easy Guide to They/Them Pronouns started as a zine called A Cheap And Easy Guide To They/Them Pronouns that was sold for $2–3.

They have created comics for Autostraddle, The New Yorker, The Nib, and Vice.

Bongiovanni lives in Minneapolis, Minnesota and teaches at Minneapolis College of Art and Design.

== Bibliography ==
- Bongiovanni, Archie; Jimerson, Tristan (2018). The Quick and Easy Guide to They/Them Pronouns. Limerence Press. ISBN 9781620104996.
- Bongiovanni, Archie (2019). Grease Bats. Boom! Studios. ISBN 9781684154111.
- Bongiovanni, Archie (2020). Yes I'm Flagging : Queer Flagging 101. Silver Sprocket. ISBN 9781945509537.
- Bongiovanni, Archie; Andrews, A. (2022). History Comics: the Stonewall Riots. Roaring Brook Press. ISBN 9781250618368.
- Bongiovanni, Archie (2023). Mimosa. Abrams, Inc. ISBN 9781419752438.
- Bongiovanni, Archie; Verhoeven, Mary (2024). Teleportation and Other Luxuries. ISBN 9781545812259.
- Bongiovanni, Archie (2026). Leo Rising: Queer Spaces, Sexuality, and Fame. ISBN 9781419770876.

== Recognition ==
The Quick and Easy Guide to They/Them Pronouns was on Autostraddle's list of "20 of the Best LGBTQ Graphic Novels of 2018".

Bongiovanni was awarded a Minnesota State Arts Board Creative Support Grant in 2020 and a Jerome Foundation grant in 2021.

History Comics: The Stonewall Riots: Making a Stand for LGBTQ Rights was on the National Council for the Social Studies' 2023 list of Notable Social Studies Trade Books for Young People.
