= Bianca Pinheiro =

Brazilian comics artist and illustrator

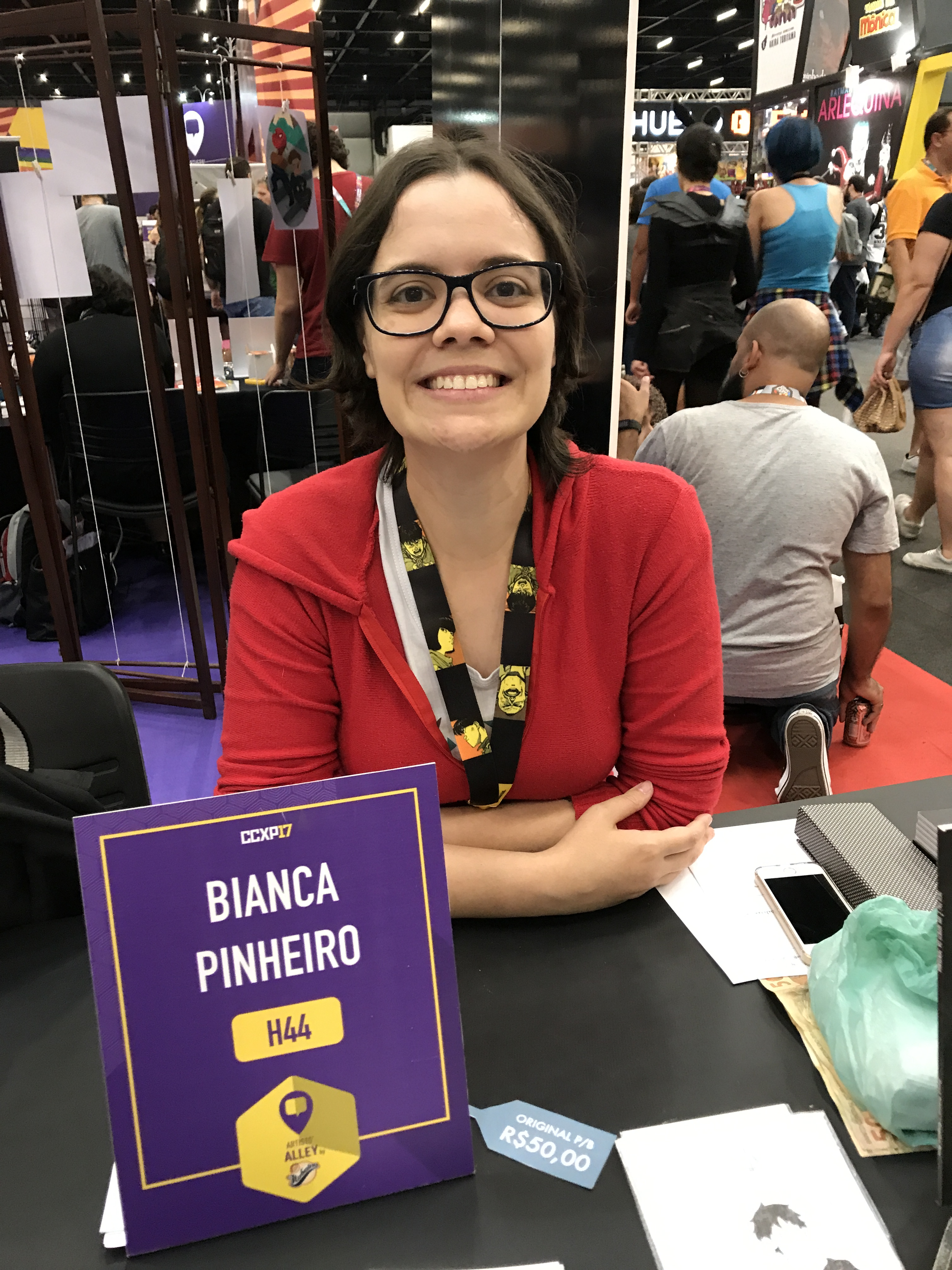
- Bianca Pinheiro in 2017 Comic Con Experience.
- Born: 21 September 1987; Rio de Janeiro
- Occupation: Comics artist
- Works: Bear, Dora, Mônica - Força
- Awards: Troféu HQ Mix for best new talent (Dora, Bear, 2015); Troféu HQ Mix for best youth publication (Mônica - Força, 2017); Troféu HQ Mix for best independent publication (Alho-Poró, 2018)

Bianca Pinheiro (Rio de Janeiro, September 21, 1987) is a Brazilian comics artist and illustrator. She graduated from Graphic Arts by UTFPR and did postgraduate studies in Comics by the Grupo Educacional Opet.

Bianca began publishing webcomics in 2012. Her main work is Bear, which tells the story of a lost girl who befriends a bear. Three printed volumes of the webcomic were launched by Editora Nemo in 2014, 2015 and 2016. In 2017, the book was launched in France by the publisher La Boîte à bulles entitled Raven et l'Ours. Between 2012 and 2015, Bianca also published a series of short comics online in her Tumblr, in Portuguese and in English.

In 2015, Bianca won the Troféu HQ Mix, the main Brazilian comic book award, in the category "New talent (writer)" for her work in the horror graphic novel Dora. The book, published the previous year independently, was republished in 2016 by the publisher house Nemo, which had already released the printed editions of Bear.

Among her main works are the independent comics Meu Pai é Um Homem da Montanha (written by Greg Stella, 2015) and Alho-Poró (2017), both financed by crowdfunding. She and Greg also published Eles Estão Por Aí (2018), by Todavia. She also did illustrations for several books, such as the children's book Palavras, Palabras (written by Lucio Luiz, Marsupial Editora, 2015) and the illustrated books Mônica(s) (many illustrators, Panini Comics, 2013) and Androides Sonham com Ovelhas Elétricas? (Aleph, 2017, Brazilian edition of Do Androids Dream of Electric Sheep?, with special illustrations in honor of the book's 50th anniversary).

In 2016, she launched the graphic novel Mônica - Força, part of the Graphic MSP label of Panini Comics, which brings new stories of the classic characters of Mauricio de Sousa created by independent Brazilian comics artists. This graphic novel won the Troféu HQ Mix of "best youth publication" in 2017

== Bibliography ==
- Bear volume 1 (Nemo, 2014)
- Dora (independent, 2014)
- Bear volume 2 (Nemo, 2015)
- Meu Pai é Um Homem da Montanha (written by Greg Stella, independent, 2015)
- Bear volume 3 (Nemo, 2016)
- Mônica - Força (Panini Brasil, 2016)
- Alho-Poró (independent, 2017)
- Eles Estão Por Aí (written by Greg Stella, Todavia, 2018)
