= Jefferson Costa =

Brazilian illustrator and comics artist

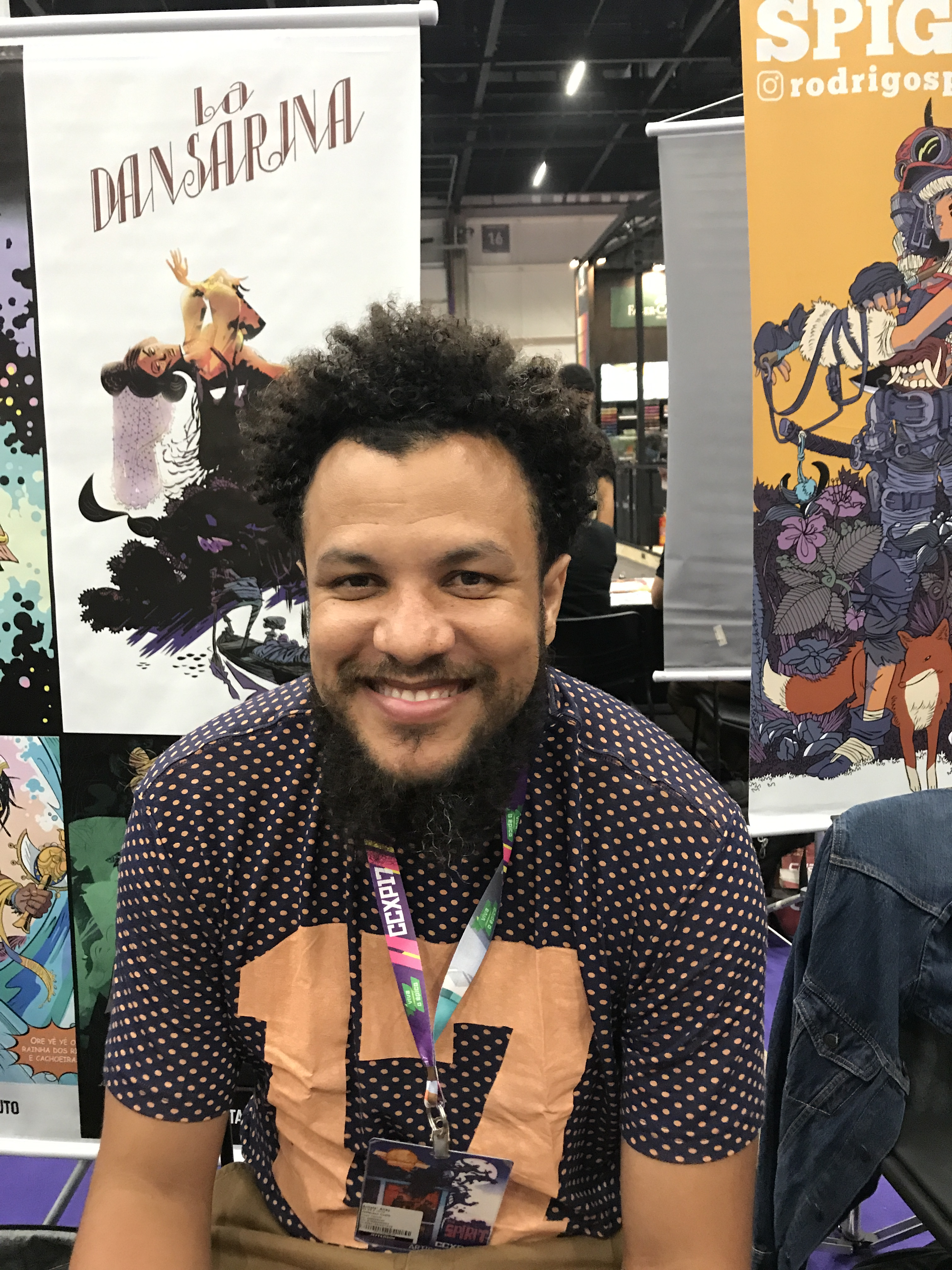
- Born: 1979 (age 46–47) São Paulo, Brazil
- Area: Cartoonist
- Notable works: Coleção Shakespeare em Quadrinhos Volume 4 La Dansarina; Jeremias - Pele
- Awards: Troféu HQ Mix; Prêmio Jabuti for Best Comic Book

Jefferson Costa (São Paulo, 1979) is a Brazilian illustrator and comics artist. He has worked in several comic books, such as the adaptation of the book Kiss Me, Judas, as well as publications such as Quebra Queixo Technorama, A Dama do Martinelli and La Dansarina and works in Brazilian compilations Front and Bang Bang. He also published works in the North American anthologies Gunned Down (Terra Major) and Outlaw Territory # 3 (Image Comics). Jefferson also works with character design and animation scenarios, having worked on Cartoon Network Brazil's Historietas Assombradas para Crianças Malcriadas, as well as the Brazilian MTV series Megaliga, Fudêncio, The Jorges and Rockstarghost. In 2013, he won the Troféu HQ Mix in the "Best Comic Adaptation" category with Coleção Shakespeare em Quadrinhos Volume 4 (adaptation of William Shakespeare's The Tempest, with scripts by Lillo Parra). In 2016 he won again the Troféu HQ Mix, this time with the graphic novel "La Dansarina" (also written by Lillo Parra) as "Best National Special Edition". In 2018, he published Jeremias - Pele, part of Graphic MSP collection, with scripts of Rafael Calça. The book earned them the 2019 Prêmio Jabuti for Best Comic Book.
