= Dylan Edwards (cartoonist) =

American comics creator

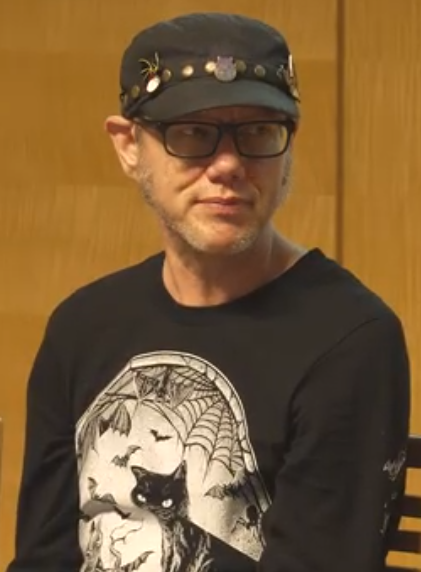
- Dylan Edwards in 2026
- Education: University of Texas at Austin
- Occupations: Illustrator; Comic artist; Author

Dylan Edwards, who also works under the pseudonyms NDR and Ender, is an American illustrator and author, active since 1995. His work has been published in media such as The Boston Phoenix, Express Gay News, Sojourner, FTM International Newsletter, and Antioch Record. Among his most recognized works are Transposes and Valley of the Silk Sky.

== Early life ==
Dylan Edwards developed an interest in art and storytelling at an early age. As a child, he read numerous comics and comic strips, many of which were unofficial strips based on Peanuts. His grandmother was a ceramicist, which led him to learn clay modelling during his childhood.

Edwards later attended the University of Texas at Austin. As the university did not offer specialized training in comics, he studied figure drawing instead. While attending the university, he also worked in a comic book store.

== Career ==
Edwards began creating comics as an amateur in 1995. Around 2000, he started working professionally, and during this period, he sent some of his early comics to Alison Bechdel, with whom he subsequently developed a friendship. Later, he gained recognition for his work Politically InQueerect, a humorous creation centred on gay Republicans. Originally started as a minicomic, it later evolved into a comic strip and eventually became a webcomic. By 2009, he was also contributing political cartoons to TXT newsmagazine and regularly publishing his comic The Outfield on Outsports.

In 2012, Edwards published Transposes, a comic focusing on people who identify within transmasculinity. The work consisted of six stories involving seven homosexual trans men, two of whom are a couple. It features a foreword written by Alison Bechdel. Although all of the individuals portrayed were real people, Edwards used fictional names to protect their identities. In 2015, he began publishing the science-fiction webcomic Valley of the Silk Sky, which features numerous asexual, queer, and transgender characters. In a 2019 interview with Melanie Gillman, Edwards stated that with Valley of the Silk Sky he sought to create an escapist science-fiction story which had transgender characters at the center of the action without being compelled to explore complex gender themes—having previously worked on many projects that addressed precisely those issues.

In 2018, Edwards contributed to the Dark Horse Comics anthology The Secret Loves of Geeks, a spiritual successor to the successful anthology The Secret Loves of Geek Girls. It featured contributions from renowned creators including Vita Ayala, Amy Chu, Gabby Rivera, and MariNaomi, and was published on Valentine's Day of that year. Throughout his career, Edwards has also contributed to various LGBT comics anthologies, including No Straight Lines, QU33R, and Beyond: The Queer Sci-Fi & Fantasy Comic Anthology.

== Works ==
=== Individual works ===
- Politically InQueerect
- Tranny Toons
- Matzo the Kosher Cat
- The OutField
- Enderstated
- Transposes (2012)
- Valley Of The Silk Sky (2015)

=== Anthologies ===
- No Straight Lines (2012)
- QU33R (2013)
- Beyond: The Queer Sci-Fi & Fantasy Comic Anthology (2015)
- The Secret Loves of Geeks (2018)

== Awards and recognitions ==
The 2012 LGBT comic book anthology No Straight Lines, of which Edwards was one of the contributors, won the Lambda Literary Award. In 2013, he was a finalist for the Lambda Literary Award in the Transgender Nonfiction category for his comic Transposes. That same year, the anthology QU33R, to which he had contributed, won the Ignatz Award.

In 2016, the National Lesbian and Gay Journalists Association awarded Edwards the "Outstanding Coverage Award on Transgender Issues".

== Personal life ==
Edwards identifies himself on the asexual spectrum and has described himself as "homoromantic". He is also a trans man. He has spoken about feeling uncomfortable at times within LGBT spaces because of assumptions made about his sexuality, and has rejected the notion that asexual people do not belong within the queer community.
