= Flavio Soares =

Brazilian comics artist

Flavio Soares is a Brazilian comics artist.

He started working as art editor in the 1990s at Franco de Rosa's studio.

In 2005, Soares started to publish the blog A Vida com Logan, in which he shared his daily life with his son Logan, who has Down syndrome.

In 2009, he began publishing a comic strip of the same name, in which he and his son were the main characters.

A Vida com Logan had three books published, one with unpublished stories and two with compilations of the strips.

Also in 2009, he began publishing the strip As Aventuras do MorsaMan, with scripts by Lucio Luiz, for the podcast Papo de Gordo.

In 2012, Soares created the comic book series Meninos e Dragões with scripts by Lucio Luiz, which was published by Editora Abril.

In 2016, Soares published his first graphic novel, A Lei de Murphy.

As of 2020, Soares began to publish the series of political cartoons Short Cuts, criticizing mainly the actions of the Brazilian government during the COVID-19 pandemic.

In 2021, he returned to release new graphic novels: O Crime de Lorde Arthur Savile, based on the eponymous tale by Oscar Wilde, and Zico: 50 Anos de Futebol (Em Quadrinhos), which tells the life of football player Zico.

== Awards ==
In 2014, Soares won the Prêmio Angelo Agostini, the oldest Brazilian comic book award, as Best Release by the Meninos e Dragões comic book.

In 2015, he won the Troféu HQ Mix, the main Brazilian comic book award, as Best Comic Strip publication for the first compilation of A Vida com Logan.

In 2020, Soares won the Vladimir Herzog Award, the main Brazilian journalistic award, alongside 109 other cartoonists who participated in the "Charge Continuada" movement, which consisted of hundreds of artists recreating a political cartoon by Renato Aroeira that had been subject of an investigation by the Brazilian government for associating President Jair Bolsonaro with Nazism because his actions during the COVID-19 pandemic.

== Bibliography ==
- A Vida com Logan (Panda Books, 2013)
- Meninos & Dragões nº 1 (Abril Jovem, 2013) - script by Lucio Luiz
- Gibi Quântico nº 1 (Quanta Estúdio de Arte, 2014) - "Uma nova onda", script by Liz Frizzine
- A Vida com Logan: para ler no sofá (Jupati Books, 2014)
- Café Espacial nº 13 (independente, 2014) - "Um último monólogo", script by Lucio Luiz
- Feitiço da Vila: a poesia de Noel Rosa em quadrinhos (Jupati Books, 2014) - "Onde está a honestidade?", art by Doug Lira / "Riso de criança", script by Estevão Ribeiro / "João Ninguém", script by Lu Cafaggi
- A Vida com Logan: o mundo em nosso quarto (Jupati Books, 2015)
- Café Espacial nº 14 (independente, 2015) - "Futuro imperfeito", script by Sergio Chaves
- A Lei de Murphy (Jupati Books, 2016)
- Meninos e Dragões volume 1: o grande caçador (Jupati Books, 2018) - script by Lucio Luiz and inks by Omar Viñole
- Mestres do Terror nº 70 (Ink & Blood Comics, 2019) - "O lobisomem de Marapuporã", script by Lillo Parra
- Histórias Passageiras (Qualidade em Quadrinhos, 2019) - "Obrigado" and "PQP", script by Eduardo Dieb
- O Crime de Lorde Arthur Savile (Ultimato do Bacon, 2021)
- Zico: 50 anos de futebol (em quadrinhos) (Ultimato do Bacon, 2021)
