= Patrick Chappatte =

Lebanese-Swiss cartoonist

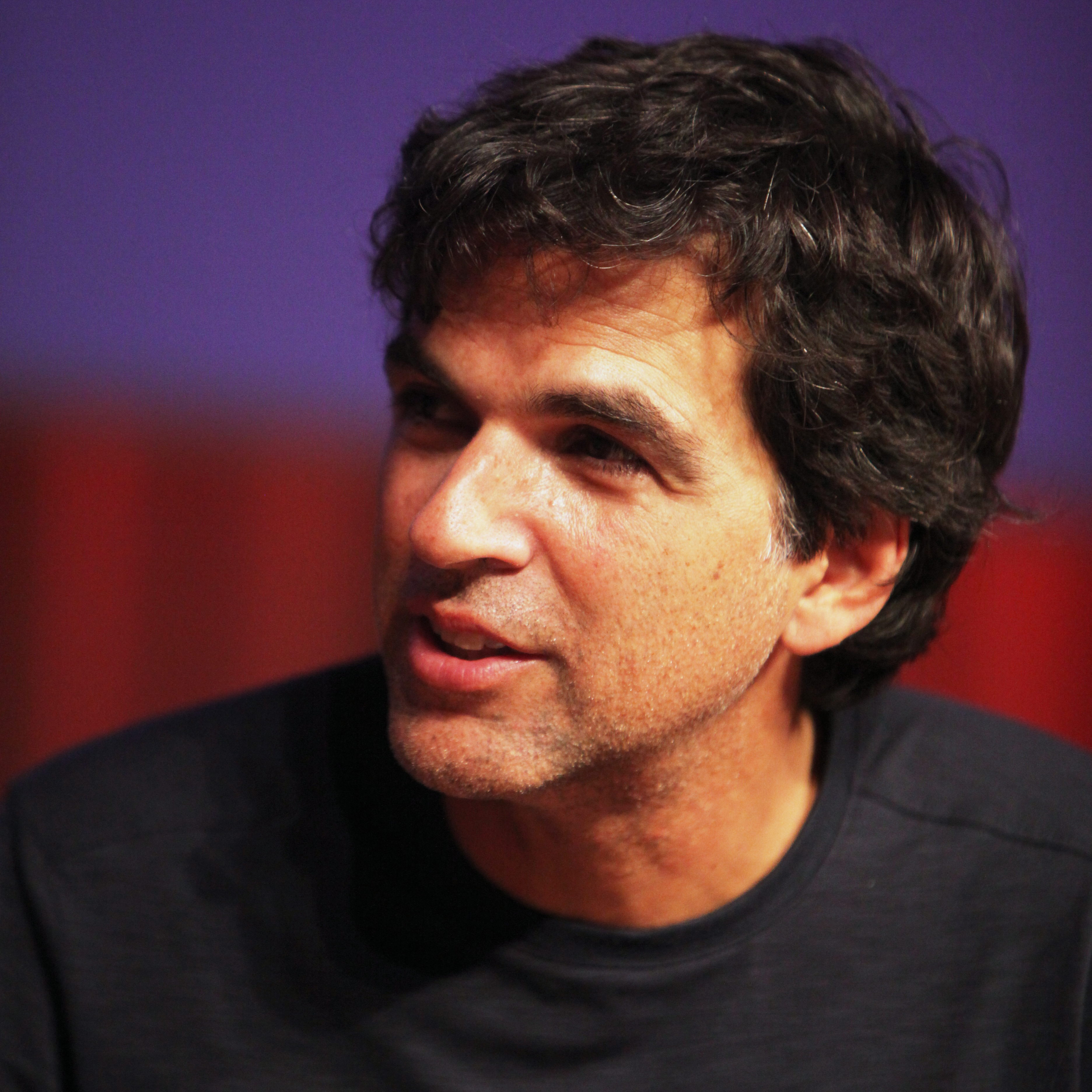
- Chappatte in 2018
- Born: February 22, 1967 (age 59) Karachi, Pakistan
- Area: Cartoonist
- Pseudonym: Chappatte
- Awards: Thomas Nast Award (2011, 2015)
- Spouse: Anne-Frédérique Widmann

Patrick Chappatte (known simply as Chappatte) (born February 22, 1967, in Karachi, Pakistan) is a Lebanese-Swiss cartoonist known for his work for Le Temps, NZZ am Sonntag, the German news magazine Der Spiegel, The New York Times International Edition and the French satirical newspaper Le Canard enchaîné. He also worked as an illustrator for the New York Times and as cartoonist for Newsweek. Many of his cartoons reflect events in Swiss and international news, such as the September 11 attacks, the rise of the Swiss People's Party, and the Israeli–Palestinian conflict.

== Biography ==
Chappatte was born on 22 February 1967 in Karachi, Pakistan to a Lebanese mother and a Swiss father. He was raised in Singapore and Switzerland.

Chappatte lives between Los Angeles and Geneva.

== Career ==
=== Editorial cartoons ===
Patrick Chappatte drew a twice-weekly cartoon in the Opinion section of The New York Times International Edition, formerly known as the International Herald Tribune, which published his work from 2001 to 2019 (when the paper stopped publishing editorial cartoons altogether).

Over the years, he has collaborated with editorial cartoonists in conflict-ridden countries with the goal of promoting dialogue through cartooning. These projects focused on Serbia, Ivory Coast, Lebanon, Kenya and Guatemala. He described the work in a TED talk in 2010. His work is syndicated by Cagle Cartoons.

=== Comics journalism ===
Since 1995, Chappatte has worked in graphic journalism, or comics journalism, a genre of reporting using the techniques of graphic novels. His most recent stories covered the war in Gaza (2009), the slums of Nairobi (2010) and gang violence in Central America (2012). These reports were published in several newspapers, including the New York Times; one was turned into a short animated documentary in 2011. (see below)

In May 2016, Chappatte (with his wife, journalist Anne-Frédérique Widmann) published "Inside Death Row," a five-part series published by The New York Times about the death penalty in the United States.

=== Animated documentary ===
Chappatte went to southern Lebanon in 2009, where people still live with the threat of actual time bombs, in the form of cluster munition bomblets. While there, Chappatte created a report in comic-book format: Death in the Field, which was published in Le Temps. The report was released in 2011 as an animated documentary. It was aired on Swiss and French TV, toured documentary festivals, and won an award in Australia. Chappatte said the process of creating the documentary was both a personal and professional endeavor. "I have a Swiss father and a Lebanese mother, so I wanted to better understand the problems that the people of Lebanon are still facing, long after the fighting stopped," he said. "I also wanted to use my craft as a cartoonist, my experience as a journalist and my sense of satire to create a new kind of prism through which to view forgotten conflicts and a new technique for revealing the humanity behind the story."

== Awards ==
In 2012, Chappatte became the first non-American to win the Overseas Press Club of America’s Thomas Nast Award for best cartoons on international affairs. He would be awarded this prize twice more: in 2016 and 2019.

In February 2013, he received the 2012 Audience Award from the Swiss satirical journal Nebelspalter.

In 2017, the Swiss association Films Plans-Fixes produced a documentary tracing his career.

In 2020, the Swiss Fondation pour Genève awarded him its annual prize "for his exceptional contribution to the influence of Geneva and for his commitment to freedom of the press and expression".

== Bibliography (English) ==
- Stress Test, 2011-2012: Cartoons from the International Herald Tribune (Globe Cartoon, 2012) ISBN 978-2970047551
- Signs of Recovery, 2009-2010: Cartoons from the International Herald Tribune (Globe Cartoon, 2010) ISBN 978-2970047544
- Partly Cloudy, 2007-2008: Cartoons from the International Herald Tribune (Globe Cartoon, 2008) ISBN 978-2970047520
- Globalized, 2005-2007: Cartoons from the International Herald (Globe Cartoon, 2007) ISBN 978-2970047513
- Another World, 2000-2004: Cartoons from the International Herald Tribune (Globe Cartoon, 2004) ISBN 978-2970047506
