= Matt Bors =

American cartoonist (born 1983)

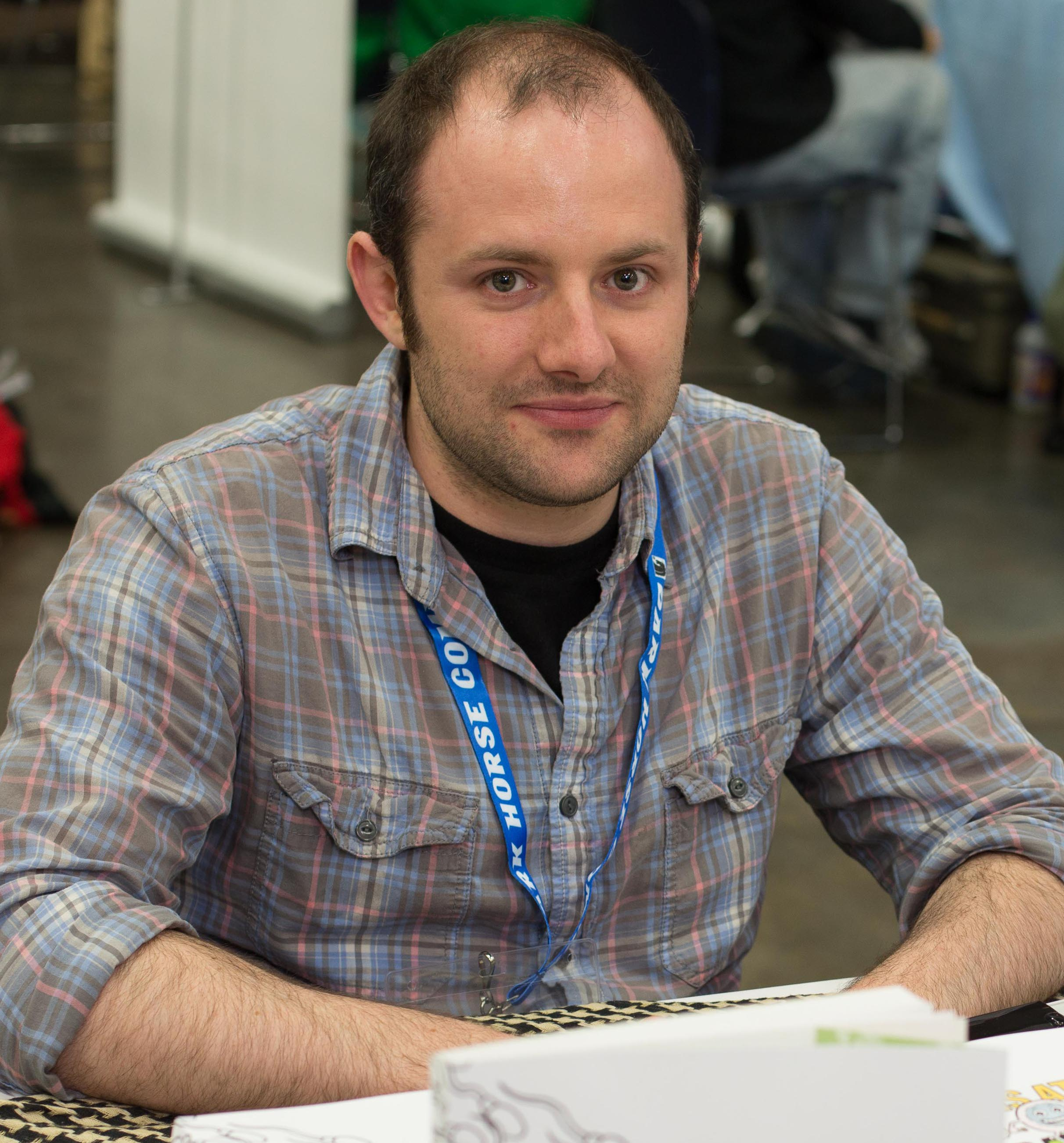
- Matt Bors at Stumptown Comics Fest 2013
- Born: Matthew Bors; September 13, 1983 (age 43) Canton, Ohio
- Area: Cartoonist
- Awards: Herblock Prize for Excellence in Cartooning, Sigma Delta Chi Award for Editorial Cartooning

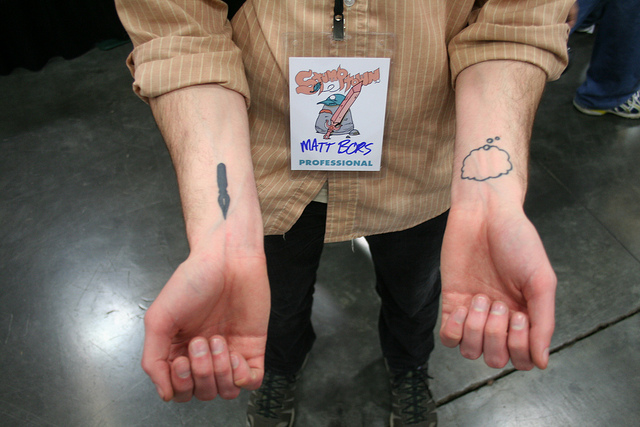
Political cartoonist Matt Bors displays his comics-themed tattoos at Stumptown Comics Fest in Portland, Oregon

Matt Bors (born 1983) is a comic book writer, artist, editor, and publisher. Bors worked as a political cartoonist from 2003-2021 and was the editor and founder of online comics publication The Nib. He was a finalist for the Pulitzer Prize in 2012 and 2020 and became the first alt-weekly cartoonist to win the Herblock Prize for Excellence in Cartooning.

== Career ==
Originally from Canton, Ohio, Bors attended the Art Institute of Pittsburgh, where he first began drawing editorial cartoons for the student newspaper. At 23, his work became syndicated by Universal Features, making him the youngest syndicated cartoonist in the country at that time. His work has since appeared in the Los Angeles Times, The Nation, The Village Voice, The Daily Beast, and on Daily Kos. In 2012, US Congressman John Larson used one of Bors's cartoons during a house floor on the Affordable Care Act.

His first graphic novel, War Is Boring, a collaboration with journalist David Axe, was published in 2010 by New American Library.

In September 2013, Bors began working in a full-time capacity as a cartoonist, writer and comics editor of The Nib at Medium. In July 2015 Bors left Medium. In February 2016 First Look Media announced that they had acquired The Nib and would be collaborating with Bors to relaunch the site. Under First Look Media, The Nib launched two seasons of online political animation and a quarterly print magazine, which won numerous comics industry awards including the Ignatz and Eisner. The Nib went fully independent in 2019, as First Look Media cut funding to its publications.

In April 2021, Bors announced that he was retiring from editorial cartooning in order to focus more on other comics work. He subsequently closed The Nib in 2023, citing costs.

Bors subsequently moved into writing monthly comics, launching the creator-owned title Justice Warriors in 2022 with co-writer and artist Ben Clarkson. In 2024, he became the writer of a new Toxic Avenger series, which led to the ongoing title Toxic Avenger Comics as well as a reviving the Toxic Crusaders as a separate miniseries.

Bors lived in Portland, Oregon from 2008 until 2020, when he announced that he would soon be moving to Ontario, Canada.

== Comics journalism ==
In addition to his editorial cartoons, Bors has also worked as both editor and journalist in the field of comics journalism. In December 2010, Bors joined the newly launched Cartoon Movement, an online platform for editorial cartoons and comics journalism from around the world, as Comics Journalism Editor. In 2010, Bors travelled to Afghanistan with Ted Rall, his first trip outside of the United States. He filed sketches and editorial cartoons while in Afghanistan which he later expanded to full-length comics published on Cartoon Movement.

In the summer of 2011 he traveled with Cartoon Movement to Haiti, to coordinate a comics project with Haitian cartoonists that would document the effects of the 2010 earthquake one year after the catastrophe. The first part of the 75-page comics project, entitled Tents beyond Tents, was published in January 2012. In 2012 Bors released "Haiti’s Scapegoats," an animated documentary short exploring the LGBT community in Haiti, produced in collaboration with Cartoon Movement and video journalist Caroline Dijckmeester-Bins.

In April 2021, Bors announced that he was retiring from editorial cartooning in order to focus more on his work in comics journalism.

== Awards ==
- 2023 - Eisner Award for Best Anthology (The Nib, as Editor)
- 2020 - Ignatz Award for Outstanding Anthology (Be Gay Do Comics, as Editor)
- 2020 - Harvey Award for Digital Book of the Year (The Nib, as Editor)
- 2020 – Pulitzer Prize for Editorial Cartooning (Finalist)
- 2019 - Transformative Work Award from Cartoon Crossroads Columbus
- 2019 - Ignatz Award for Outstanding Anthology (The Nib, as Editor)
- 2012 – Pulitzer Prize for Editorial Cartooning (Finalist)
- 2012 – Herblock Prize for Excellence in Editorial Cartooning
- 2012 – Sigma Delta Chi Award for Editorial Cartooning (Circulation of 100,000+)

== Bibliography ==
=== Ahoy Comics ===
- Justice Warriors
  - Justice Warriors Vol 1 (2022)
  - Justice Warriors: Vote Harder (2024)
- Toxic Avenger
  - Toxic Avenger #1-5 (Vol. 1) (2024)
  - Toxic Avenger Comics #1-10 (2026)
  - Toxic Crusaders #1-5 (2026)
  - Toxie Team-Up #5 (2025)
- Project: Cryptid
  - Project: Cryptic #6, short story "Cabrón" (2024)

=== The Nib ===
- The Nib Magazine #1-15 (2018-2023)
- Be Gay, Do Comics (2020)
- Eat More Comics (2015)

=== Oni Press / EC Comics ===
- Cruel Universe #4, short story "By the Book" (2024)
- Cruel Kingdom #3, short story "Just Desserts" (2024)
- Catacomb of Torment #2, short story "Hostile Architecture" (2025)
- Catacomb of Torment #6, short story "The Composite Man" (2025)

New American Library

- War is Boring (2010)

=== Self-Published ===
- Life Begins at Incorporation (2013)

=== Clover ===
- We Should Improve Society Somewhat (2020)
