= Melanie Gillman =

American cartoonist, illustrator, and lecturer

- Area: Cartoonist
- Notable works: As the Crow Flies
- Awards: Society of Illustrators gold medal

Melanie Gillman is an American queer non-binary cartoonist, illustrator, and lecturer, specializing in LGBTQ comics for Young Adult readers, including the webcomic As the Crow Flies. Their comics have been published by Boom! Studios, Iron Circus Comics, Lion Forge Comics, Slate, VICE, Prism Comics, Northwest Press, and The Nib.

== Education ==
Gillman received a Bachelor of Arts from the University of Colorado Boulder and a Master of Fine Arts from the Center for Cartoon Studies.

== Career ==
=== Teaching ===
Gillman began teaching Professional Practices at the California College of the Arts (CCA) in 2015, and was later appointed Senior Lecturer in Comics. They teach courses at the Rocky Mountain College of Art and Design and the Art Students' League of Denver and have been a writing fellow with the Tulsa Artist Fellowship program since 2017.

=== Publications ===
Gillman's first graphic novel Smbitten – about lesbians, swing-dancing, fancy hats, and vampires – was produced as part of their Masters thesis at the Center for Cartoon Studies.

In 2012 they began As the Crow Flies, a webcomic about a 13-year-old African American queer girl who finds herself at an all-white Christian backpacking camp. The first volume of As the Crow Flies was funded through Kickstarter. The Amelia Bloomer Project named it as one of their 2019 top 10 books for readers from birth to age 18. As the Crow Flies received the Stonewall Book Award Honor in 2018, was also nominated for the "Best Digital/Webcomic" Eisner Award in 2014 and the "Outstanding Comic" Ignatz Award in 2016. The Society of Illustrators awarded Gillman a gold medal for it.

Gillman was co-editor with Kori Michele Handwerker and a contributor to The Other Side, an anthology of 19 queer paranormal romance comics published in 2016. In 2016, they began writing an ongoing Steven Universe comics series for Boom! Studios.

Under Lerner Publishing Group, Gillman published Stage Dreams in 2019. The story centers around a female Latinx outlaw and a runaway trans woman in New Mexico during the Civil War. Citing their interest in historical fiction and the lack of queer representation in such stories, Gillman aimed to create a story which depicted queer history prior to the Civil Rights movement.

In 2019, Gillman received the opportunity to create a compilation of queer fairy tales from Random House Graphic after the success of a series of queer fairy-tale comics Gillman published online garnered widespread popularity. The opportunity led to the publication of Other Ever Afters in 2022. Gillman noted following a Western European fairytale format of storytelling to reinterpret old stories in a more modern point of view. Gillman's intent behind the stories of Other Ever Afters was to provoke readers into thinking about how women and girls are treated within traditional tales and stories.

Their newest comic, The Goblin Throne, will be released as a graphic novel published by Iron Circus Comics in 2027.

== Personal life ==
Gillman lives in Columbus, Ohio. Gillman is non-binary and uses they/them pronouns.

== Bibliography ==
=== Books ===
- As the Crow Flies (2017)
- Care Bears Volume 1: Rainbow River Rescue (2016)
- The Other Side: An Anthology of Queer Paranormal Romance (2016)
- Steven Universe #1 (2017)
- Steven Universe #2 (2017)
- Steven Universe #3 (2017)
- Steven Universe #4 (2017)
- Steven Universe #8 (2017)
- Steven Universe: Warp Tour (2017)
- Steven Universe: Punching Up (2018)
- Stage Dreams (2019)
- Other Ever Afters: New Queer Fairy Tales (2022)
- The Goblin Throne (2027)
