= Anne-Frédérique Widmann =

Swiss journalist and director

- Born: 1965; Geneva
- Occupation: Journalist
- Employer: Radio Télévision Suisse (2023–)
- Spouse: Patrick Chappatte
- Awards

Anne-Frédérique Widmann is a Swiss investigative journalist, director and producer, living between Switzerland and the USA, where she spent 9 years.

Born in 1965 in Neuchâtel, Switzerland, she graduated from the Graduate Institute in Geneva, where she was trained as a business journalist before specializing in investigative journalism and foreign reporting. Her stories were published in the Swiss daily La Suisse, Le Nouveau Quotidien and the newsmagazine L’Hebdo. U.S. correspondent between 1995 and 1998, she covered American politics and reported extensively on the scandal of Jewish assets retained by Swiss banks.

She joined the RTS Un, a Swiss TV broadcasting corporation, in 2003, directing various 52-minute documentaries for the prime time news show Temps Présent. She became co-producer and anchor of Temps Présent from 2005 until 2010. Between 2010 and 2014, she founded and directed the investigative desk of RTS. Her investigative documentary in Colombia Diplomates suisses dans le piège colombien was granted the Prize Nicolas Bouvier in 2009. The film Œil pour œil, la vengeance des Kadhafi was selected for the Berlin Prize and nominated on the short list for the Italia Prize in 2014.

In Los Angeles, in 2014-2015, she co-founded the project Windows on Death Row, a dual exhibition of cartoons by top U.S. editorial cartoonists and artworks by death row inmates. Inaugurated at the University of Southern California in Los Angeles in October 2015, Windows on Death Row toured the United States for two years and closed at Columbia Law School in September 2017.

Her full length documentary film Free Men, depicting the story of Arkansas death row inmate Kenneth Reams and his struggle for justice, was released in theatres in 2018. The film won four awards in international festivals, including the special jury prize at the Festival International du Cinema d'Alger (FICA) 2018.

Widmann works for the Swiss TV magazines Mise au Point and Temps Présent. She won the journalism award Prix Dumur 2019 for her entire career and is married to the Swiss cartoonist Patrick Chappatte.

In 2026, the movie Freedom - Shewit's Destiny was released, which Widmann directed to document the decade-long journey of an Eritrean woman fleeing oppression as a teenager and her fight for the ability to stay in Switzerland.
