= First Look Media =

American nonprofit media organization

- Type: Nonprofit organization
- Industry: Mass media
- Founded: October 2013; 13 years ago
- Founders: Pierre Omidyar
- Headquarters: New York City, New York, United States
- Key people: Michael Bloom (CEO)
- Products: Investigative journalism, new media
- Subsidiaries: The Intercept; The Nib; Field of Vision; Topic Studios; Topic; Press Freedom Defense Fund
- Website: firstlook.media

First Look Media is an American nonprofit media organization founded by Pierre Omidyar in October 2013 as a venue for "original, independent journalism". The project was started as a collaboration with Glenn Greenwald, Jeremy Scahill, and Laura Poitras with a promised $250 million in funding from Omidyar. The organization announced plans to support multiple publications, the first of which was The Intercept, launched in February 2014.

A second publication was announced in February 2014 that would focus on financial and political corruption, headed by Matt Taibbi. Although the name of the publication was not publicly announced, the name Racket was reportedly chosen. The publication was to be launched autumn 2014 but in October, it was reported that Taibbi was on leave after "disagreements with higher-ups". On October 28, Omidyar stated in a press release that Taibbi had left First Look.

== History ==
In December 2014, First Look Media announced the launch of Reported.ly, a social media news service led by Andy Carvin. However, in August 2016, Reported.ly said FLM has "chosen to part ways with us," and was planning to shut down.

In January 2015, Betsy Reed joined as the editor in chief of The Intercept, replacing John Cook. Shortly thereafter, she hired Charlotte Greensit as managing editor in April 2015.

In February 2016 First Look Media announced they would be partnering with Matt Bors to relaunch The Nib.

In 2017, First Look Media launched the photo and video website Topic.com. Topic Studios was also launched as part of this. They have helped produce Roman J. Israel, Esq., Risk, Spotlight and Leave No Trace.

In May 2017, First Look Media relaunched the Press Freedom Defense Fund to fund first amendment court cases.

In June 2019, First Look Media decided to stop funding The Nib and laid off its staff as of the end of July 2019.

On October 29, 2020, Glenn Greenwald announced his resignation from The Intercept and First Look Media, citing editorial censorship of his story concerning the Biden–Ukraine conspiracy theory and allegations concerning Joe Biden's conduct with regard to China, and also citing attempted interference with his contractual right to publish rejected stories elsewhere. Greenwald published his resignation letter and rebuttal. Betsy Reed, The Intercept's editor-in-chief, disputed Greenwald's accusations and claims of censorship, and accused him of presenting dubious claims by the Trump campaign as journalism.

On November 30, 2020, Laura Poitras was fired by First Look Media, allegedly in relation to the Reality Winner controversy. More recently, the Topic Studios unit of First Look Media inked a first look deal with Loveless.

On January 9, 2023, The Intercept announced that it would restructure as an independent non-profit organization, with financial help from First Look.

== Resignation of Ken Silverstein ==
In February 2015, senior investigative reporter Ken Silverstein, who had been hired in December 2013, announced his resignation. Writing in Politico, Silverstein described First Look as "a slowly unfolding disaster, not because of editorial meddling from the top, but because of what I came to believe was epic managerial incompetence. …For all of the bean counting and expense account-approving that Omidyar's organizational structure imposed on us, they were shockingly disinterested [sic] in the actual journalism. …Top management was so aloof that it was hard to figure out who was in charge."

== Podcasts ==
First Look Media began partnering to produce podcasts in 2016. Shows include:

- Politically Re-Active with W. Kamau Bell & Hari Kondabolu (with Earwolf)
- Intercepted with Jeremy Scahill (with Panoply Media)
- Maeve in America—hosted by Maeve Higgins (with Panoply Media)
- Missing Richard Simmons—hosted by Dan Taberski (with Pineapple Street Media)
- Deconstructed with Ryan Grim
- Murderville, GA with Liliana Segura and Jordan Smith
- Running From Cops with Dan Taberski
