= Prêmio Jabuti for Best Comic Book =

Yearly Brazilian prize for comics

- Awarded for: Brazilian comics
- Sponsored by: Brazilian Book Chamber
- Location: São Paulo
- Country: Brazil
- First award: 2017
- Website: https://www.premiojabuti.com.br/

Best Comic Book is one of the categories of Prêmio Jabuti, a traditional Brazilian literature award that has been held since 1959.

This category was created in 2017, after the creation of a petition headed by comic book artists Wagner Willian, Ramon Vitral and Érico Assis, which requested its creation and which had more than 2 thousand adhesions and the support of well-known artists such as Laerte Coutinho, Marcelo D'Salete and Rafael Coutinho. The first winner of the category was Gidalti Oliveira Moura Júnior with the graphic novel Castanha do Pará. In 2018, Marcelo D'Salete was awarded the prize for Angola Janga, and in 2019, Jefferson Costa and Rafael Calça shared the prize for Jeremias: Pele.

According to the regulation, in this category compete "books composed of original or adapted stories, told through sequential drawings, defined by the union of color, message and image" (with this, the comics were also prevented from being entered in the other categories, including Best Illustration).

In 2017, the top-3 were considered winners of the Jabuti Award and received the trophy, with only the first place winning the cash prize and being considered eligible for the "Fiction Book of the Year" category. As of 2018, only the first was considered the category winner.

In 2018, the creation of the Jabuti Award received the Troféu HQ Mix as "Major Contribution".
