= Sam Wallman =

Australian cartoonist and comics journalist

Sam Wallman is an Australian comics journalist, political cartoonist and editor based in Melbourne, Victoria. He is actively involved in the trade union movement, having previously been a union delegate, and an employee of the National Union of Workers.

In 2014, the team behind his viral comic At Work In Our Detention Centres: A Guard's Story was nominated for a Walkley Award, and won the Australian Human Rights Award in the Print and Online Media category. In 2016, his long-form comic essays Winding Up The Window: The End of Australia's Auto Industry and Brick by Brick: Is This Europe were nominated for Walkley Awards.

He was shortlisted for the 2023 Victorian Premier's Prize for Nonfiction for Our Members Be Unlimited: A Comic about Workers and Their Unions. The book was also shortlisted for the 2023 the Nonfiction Book Award at the Queensland Literary Awards.
