= Susie Cagle =

American journalist and editorial cartoonist

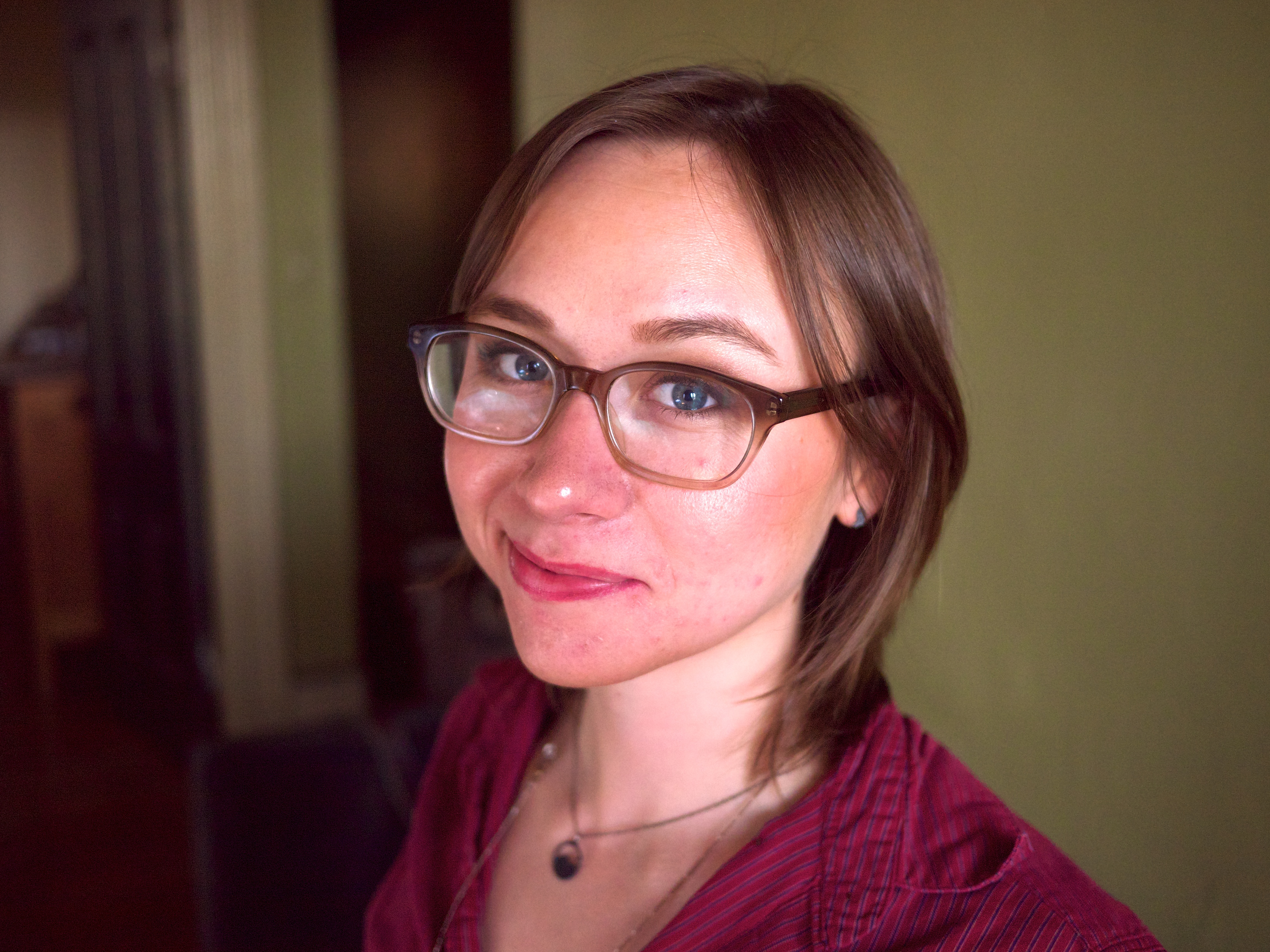
- Born: Stamford, Connecticut
- Area: Cartoonist

Susie Cagle is an investigative journalist based in California. Her reporting focuses primarily on climate change on the Pacific Coast, and she has also written about the tech industry, labor and civil unrest.

Cagle has been influential in the emerging field of graphic journalism, combining illustrations and data visualizations with traditional reporting since 2011.

== Career ==
Since 2024, Cagle has been an editor at The San Francisco Standard. She has been a reporter at The Guardian, ProPublica and Grist, as well as a contributing writer at Pacific Standard. Her work has been published in The New York Times, Wired, MIT Technology Review, The Nation, Dwell, VICE, Vox and others.

Her illustrated columns for Medium won an Online Journalism Award in 2014 and were nominated again in 2015.

Cagle was a 2015-2016 John S. Knight journalism fellow at Stanford University. In 2023 she was named an Alicia Patterson Foundation journalism fellow.

Her illustrated reporting for The Marshall Project on flood risks to two prisons in Corcoran, California was awarded a Sigma Delta Chi and an Online Journalism Award for climate reporting, and was a finalist for an Oakes Award for distinguished environmental reporting in 2024.

Her reporting has been supported by grants from the Fund for Investigative Journalism and Economic Hardship Reporting Project.

Her forthcoming book on California and climate, The End of the West, will be published by Random House. It is shortlisted for the 2025 Lukas Work in Progress award.
