= Mattie Lubchansky =

American cartoonist and illustrator

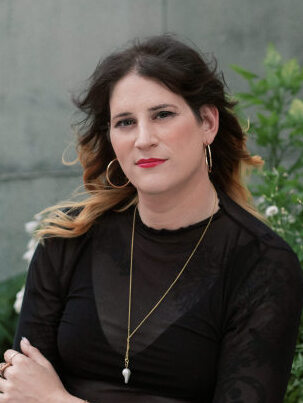
- Lubchansky in 2022
- Writing career
- Genre: satirical comics
- Notable works: Boys Weekend, Simplicity
- Website: mattielubchansky.com

Mattie Lubchansky is an American cartoonist and illustrator. She specializes in satirical comics about American politics.

== Career ==
Lubchansky has published comic strips in The Nib, where she was associate editor, as well as on other sites such as Current Affairs, The Daily Dot and Jewish Currents.

Her work is mostly short strips (with four panels), and her editorial work focuses mainly on strips as well. She was a finalist for the 2020 Herblock Prize. Her 2021 book The Antifa Super Soldier Cookbook spoofs right-wing conspiracy theories about Antifa activists in the United States. A review in Fast Company said Lubchansky "may have created the definitive piece of satire about the conservative mindset." In 2022, Print magazine declared Lubchansky one of five political cartoonists to follow on Instagram, writing, "They love to play with surreal, sci fi-inspired concepts, and have a knack for making dystopia feel at least a little funny."

Her debut full-length graphic novel, Boys Weekend, was published in 2023, and was listed by NPR and the Washington Post as one of the best graphic novels of the year. Her graphic novel Simplicity was listed as a bestseller by USA Today. The typeface used in her comics is inspired by her handwriting and is called "Lubhand".

== Personal life ==
Lubchansky first studied engineering and worked in construction before becoming a cartoonist. She is a trans woman and uses she/her pronouns.

== Publications ==
In addition to her comics strips, mostly published on The Nib, Lubchansky has been writing a webcomic, Please Listen To Me, since 2010.

She has written or illustrated several books as well:

- Dad Magazine, co-authored with Jaya Saxena (Quirk, 2016) ISBN 978-1594748646
- Skeleton Party (self-published, 2016)
- The Antifa Super Soldier Cookbook (Silver Sprocket, 2021) ISBN 978-1-945509-64-3
- Flash Forward: An Illustrated Guide to Possible (And Not So Possible) Tomorrows, co-written with Rose Eveleth and Sophie Goldstein (Abrams Books, 2021) ISBN 9781419745478
- Boys Weekend (Pantheon, 2023) ISBN 9780593316719
- Simplicity (Pantheon, July 29, 2025) ISBN 9780593701126
