= Mario Cau =

Brazilian comics artist

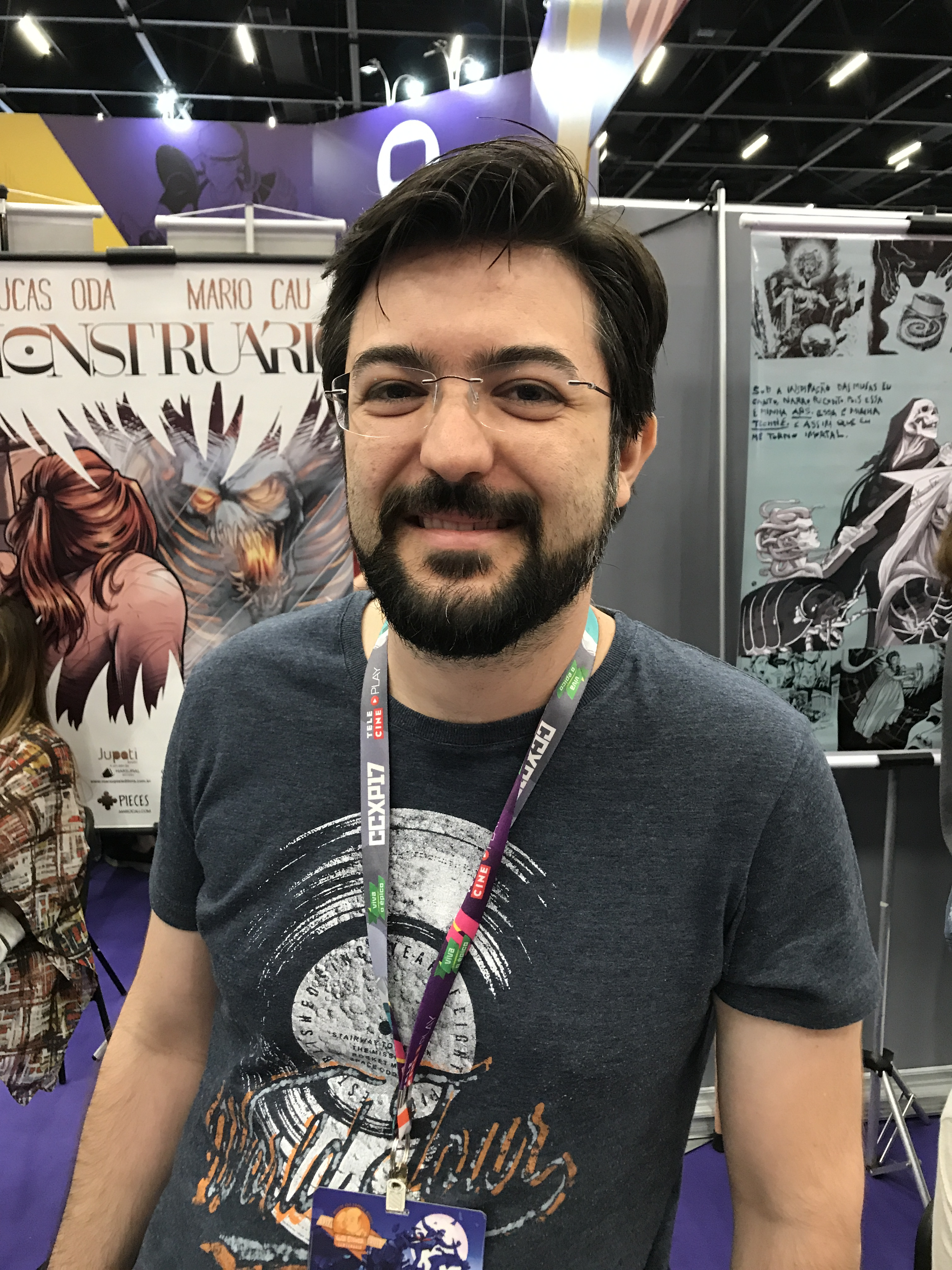
- Area: Cartoonist
- Notable works: Terapia
- Awards: Troféu HQ Mix; Prêmio Jabuti

Mario Cau is a Brazilian comics artist. One of his most prominent works is the webcomic Terapia (Therapy, co-created by Rob Gordon and Marina Kurcis), published from 2011 to 2018, about the psychotherapy sessions of a nameless boy. This webcomic was nominated as best webcomic in Troféu HQ Mix since 2012, winning in 2012 and 2014. Mario also won the 2013 Prêmio Jabuti (the most traditional Brazilian literary award) in "best illustration" and "best school related book" categories by comics adaptation of classic book Dom Casmurro (co-created by Felipe Greco).
