= Sarah Mirk =

American writer and journalist

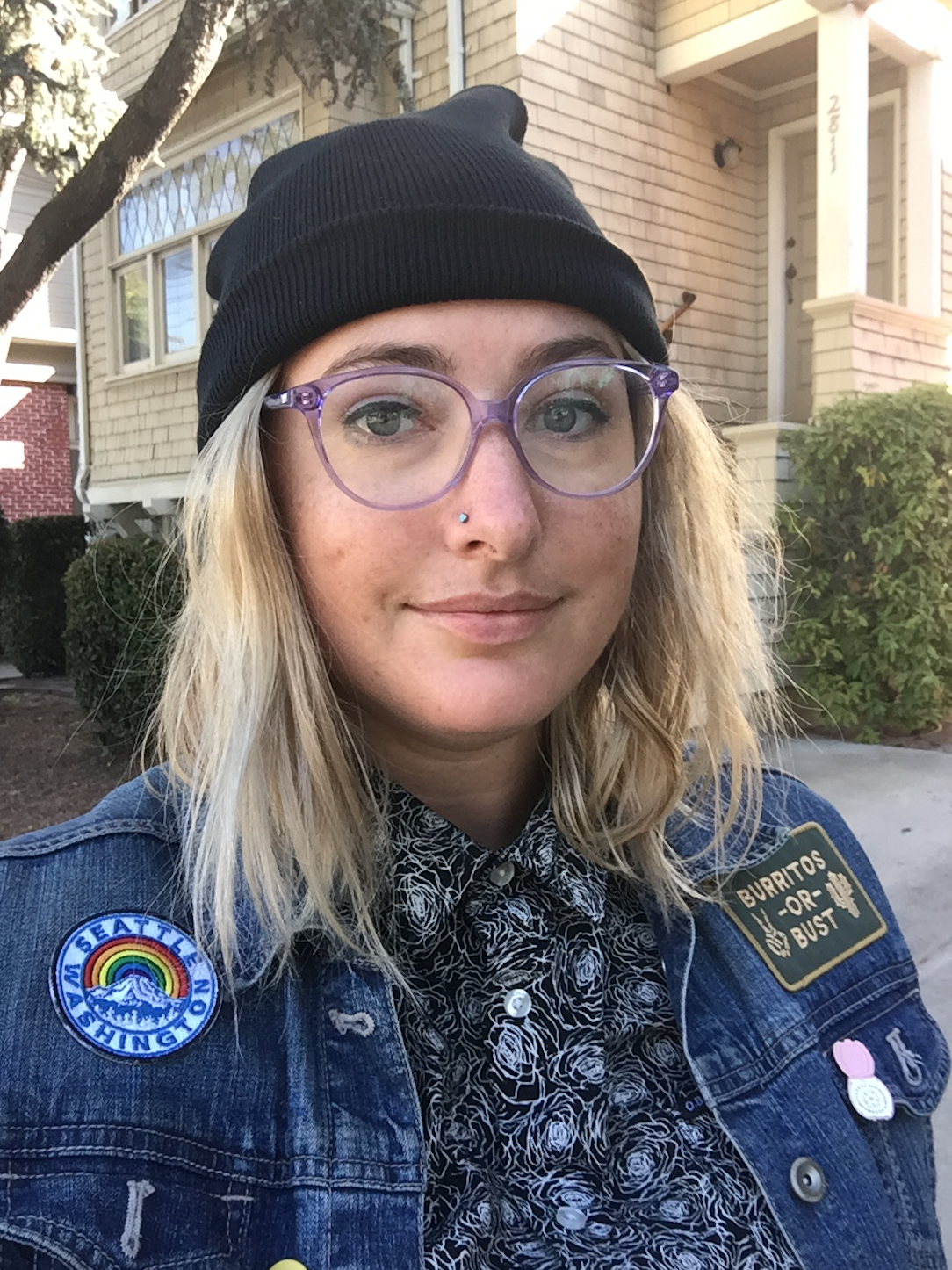
- Mirk in 2019
- Education: Grinnell College
- Occupation: Journalist

Sarah Shay Mirk (she/they) is an American author, zinester, and journalist based in Portland, Oregon, in the United States.

== Education ==
Mirk attended Grinnell College, graduating in 2008.

== Career ==
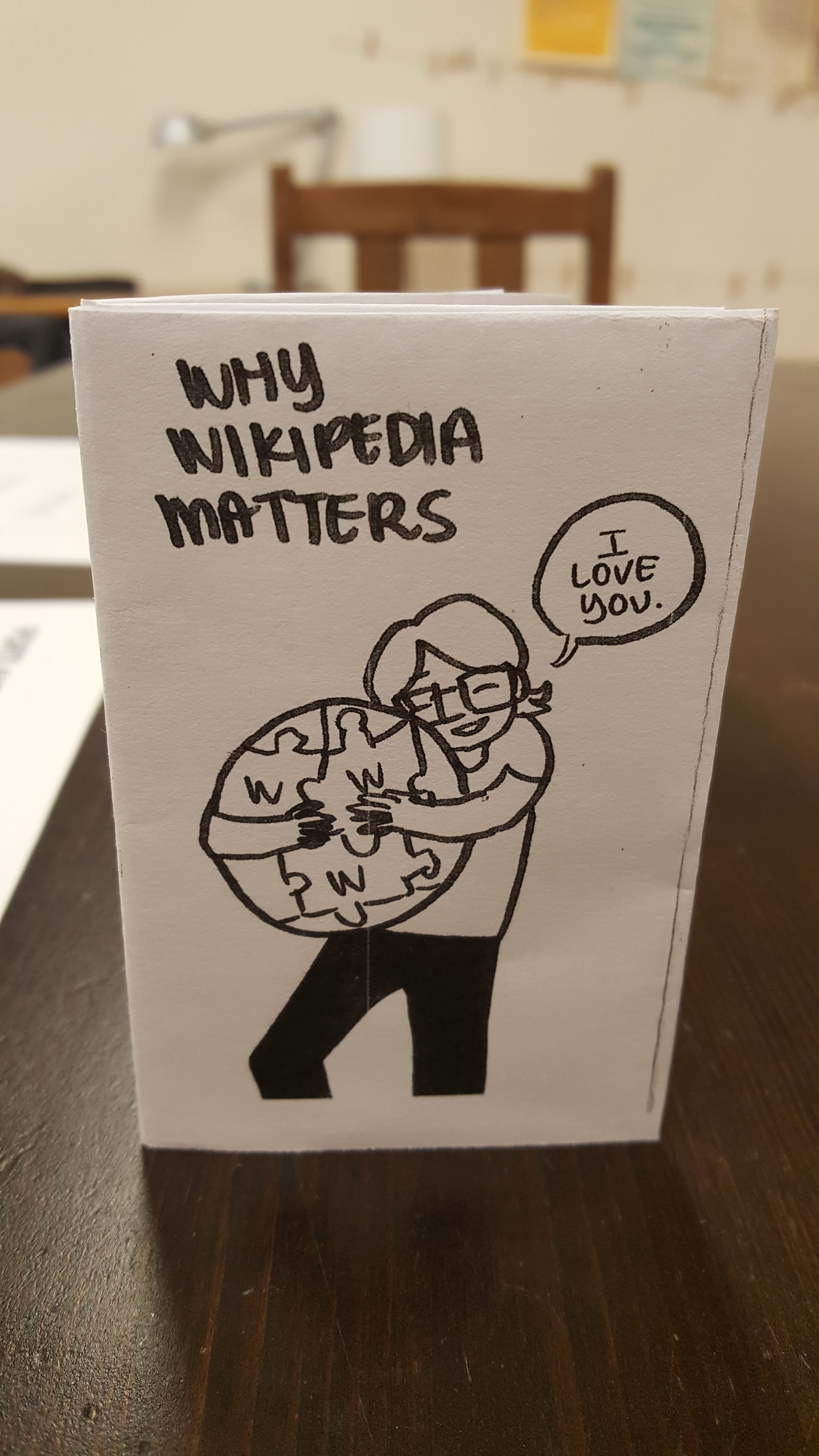
Cover of "Why Wikipedia Matters", Mirk's zine about Wikipedia, 2022

She worked for the Portland Mercury from 2008 to 2013. She has also written for Bitch Media. Since 2017 Mirk has been a contributing editor at The Nib.

In 2019, they also undertook the enterprise of making one zine a day, and she then compiled a hundred of them in a self-published book, Year of Zines (2020). They make their zines freely available to "anyone, especially teachers and educators".

Guantanamo Voices was a New York Times pick for the Best Graphic Novels of 2020. Mirk also teaches a writing class for graduate students at Portland State University's Art + Design program.

Their comics have been featured in The Nib, The New Yorker, Bitch, and NPR.

In 2024, Sarah Mirk faced online criticism after publishing a satirical, "sanitized" version of the handkerchief code.

== Works ==
=== Articles ===
- Mirk, Sarah (March 26, 2014). "Open Source Feminism: An Intervention with Wikipedia". NTEN: The Nonprofit Technology Enterprise Network.

=== Books ===
- Oregon History Comics (Know Your City, 2012. Small comic books about Oregon history. Available for free for non-commercial purposes on Mirk's official website.)
- Sex from Scratch: Making Your Own Relationship Rules (Microcosm, 2014)
- Open Earth (Limerence Press, 2018. A queer sci-fi comic about polyamory, with art by Eva Cabrera and Claudia Aguirre)
- Guantanamo Voices: True Accounts from the World’s Most Infamous Prison (Abrams, 2020. Anthology of nonfiction comics)
- Year of Zines (self-published, 2020)
- Making Nonfiction Comics (Abrams ComicArts, 2025. With Eleri Harris)

== Interviews ==
- Nieman Reports - How comics can enhance reader engagement, bring new audiences to narrative nonfiction.
