= The Nib =

American online daily comics publication

- Available in: English
- Creator: Matt Bors
- Editor: Matt Bors
- Key people: Features editor: Eleri Harris; Associate editor: Mattie Lubchansky; Contributing editors: Sarah Shay Mirk, Andy Warner, Whit Taylor; Designer: Mark Kaufman
- Website: thenib.com
- Commercial: No
- Launched: September 2013; 13 years ago

The Nib was an American online daily comics publication focused on political cartoons, graphic journalism, essays and memoir about current affairs. Founded by cartoonist Matt Bors in September 2013, The Nib was an independent member-supported publisher that ceased operating in September 2023.

== Background ==
Originally published on Medium, the platform underwent changes in May 2015 resulting in The Nib shifting focus and publishing less content regularly. In July 2015, Bors announced The Nib would no longer publish on Medium and stated he would take the title elsewhere. He self-published a collection of comics as a print anthology called Eat More Comics!: The Best of The Nib in September 2015.

In February 2016, First Look Media announced it would partner with Matt Bors to relaunch The Nib. The site officially re-launched under First Look Media in July 2016. In October 2016, First Look Media announced that Topic, the company's multimedia storytelling studio, would produce The Nib's first animated series, also called "The Nib". The series' first episode premiered in June 2017, and its second season launched in March 2018. In September 2018, The Nib magazine was launched at the Small Press Expo.

In June 2019, First Look Media decided to stop funding The Nib and laid off its staff as of the end of July 2019. Bors announced he would be continuing to publish comics on The Nib with member support from its subscription service, The Inkwell. In December 2019, The Nib successfully crowdfunded a new comics anthology Be Gay Do Comics, collecting works by queer artists.

In May 2023, Bors announced that The Nib would cease publishing after the summer of 2023. On September 1, 2023, the last email publication was sent out. Bors intends to keep the website and all of its content accessible online in an archived format.

== Notable contributors ==
- Lucy Bellwood
- Ruben Bolling
- Gemma Correll
- Mike Dawson
- Matt Furie
- KC Green
- Pia Guerra
- Chris Hayes
- Mattie Lubchansky
- Jamie Noguchi
- Pat Oliphant
- Nate Powell
- Jon Rosenberg
- Jen Sorensen
- Ann Telnaes
- Tom Tomorrow

== Awards and nominations ==
In 2016, The Nib received a nomination for a Will Eisner Comic Industry Award for Best Anthology. In 2017, contributors Ted Closson, Sarah Winifred Searle, Eleri Harris, and Ben Passmore received nominations for The Cartoonist Studio Prize for Best Web Comic of the Year, and contributor Gemma Correll won a National Cartoonists Society Reuben Award. Also in 2017, contributors Amanda Scurti and Mike Dawson received nominations for Ignatz Awards for Outstanding Online Comic. Contributor Bianca Xunise received an Ignatz Award in 2017 for her Nib comic "The Weight of Being Black in America". In July 2018, Eleri Harris won the Australian Ledger cartooning prize for her serialized Nib comic Reported Missing. Contributor Charis Jackson-Barrios was awarded the 2018 Locher Award. Her winning entry included several Nib pieces. Mike Dawson also received a nomination in 2018 for an Eisner Award for Best Webcomic.

In July 2019, contributor Chelsea Saunders won the Locher Award for her Nib work. In September 2019, Matt Bors was given an Ignatz Award for Outstanding Series for The Nib magazine. Also in September 2019, Matt Bors was given the Transformative Work Award at Cartoon Crossroads Columbus (CXC) for changing the course of comics history. In 2019, The Nib won the Ringo Award for Best Webcomic. In 2023, The Nib won an Eisner Award for Best Anthology. This was awarded in the publication's final year of operation, and was awarded to The Nib because of its printed magazine titles in particular.
