= Ignatz Award for Outstanding Minicomic =

US comics and cartooning award

- Awarded for: Outstanding achievements in comics and cartooning by small press creators or creator-owned projects published by larger publishers
- Location: Bethesda, Maryland
- Country: United States
- Presented by: Ignatz Award Committee
- Hosted by: Small Press Expo
- First award: 1997
- Website: www.smallpressexpo.com/ignatz-awards

The Ignatz Award for Outstanding Minicomic, established in 1997 as part of the Ignatz Awards, is an annual literary award that recognizes outstanding achievements in comics and cartooning by small press creators or creator-owned projects published by larger publishers. The award for outstanding minicomic is presented to "comics that are not 'professionally' published"; rather, they may "are usually printed at the local copy store or via a risograph, hand stapled, and predominantly self-distributed and are not solicited through major distributors".

== Recipients ==
Award winners and finalists
Year	Creator(s)	Work	Publisher	Result	Ref.
1997	James Kochalka	The Perfect Planet		Winner	
1997	Pete Sickman-Garner	Hey Mister #4		Finalist	
1997	John Porcellino	King-Cat Comics #52		Finalist	
1997	Sam Henderson	Magic Whistle #9		Finalist	
1997	Alan Hunt	Out There #5		Finalist	
1998	Rachel Hartman	Amy Unbounded	Pug House Press	Winner	
1998	Yvonne Mojica	Bathroom Girls		Finalist	
1998	John Porcellino	King-Cat Comics		Finalist	
1998	James Kochalka	Magic Boy Does Laundry		Finalist	
1998	Mat Brinkman	Oaf		Finalist	
1999	Brian Ralph	Fireball #7	Highwater Books	Winner	
1999	Mat Brinkman	Bolol Belittle	Self-published	Finalist	
1999	Kurt Wolfgang	Noe-Fie #8	Noe-Fie Mono-Media	Finalist	
1999	Androo Robinson	Ped Xing	Self-published	Finalist	
1999	Aaron Augenblick	Tales of the Great Unspoken	Self-published	Finalist	
2000	Kurt Wolfgang (ed.)	LowJinx #2	Noe-Fie Mono-Media	Winner	
2000	Johnny Ryan	Angry Youth Comix #11	Self-published	Finalist	
2000	Androo Robinson	Jug	Self-published	Finalist	
2000	John Kerschbaum	Timberdoodle	Self-published	Finalist	
2000	Tom Beland	True Stories, Swear to God	Self-published	Finalist	
2001		Ignatz Awards cancelled after 9-11 Attacks		Winner	
2001	Rachel Hartman	Amy Unbounded #12	Pug House Press	Finalist	
2001	Jesse Reklaw	Democracy: Mime Complaint #5	Self-published	Finalist	
2001	Sean Bieri	Jumbo Jape	Self-published	Finalist	
2001	Kurt Wolfgang (ed.)	Low Jinx 3: The Big Rip-Off	Noe-Fie Mono-Media	Finalist	
2001	John Hankiewicz	Tepid Spring 2001	Self-published	Finalist	
2002	Megan Kelso	Artichoke Tales #1	Highwater Books	Winner	
2002	Tony Consiglio	Double Cross Assortment	Self-published	Finalist	
2002	Kevin Huizenga	Gloriana: Super Monster #14	Self-published	Finalist	
2002	John Kerschbaum	Homecoming	Fontanelle Press	Finalist	
2002	Lark Pien	Long Tail Kitty: Heaven	Self-published	Finalist	
2003	Jeffrey Brown	I Am Going to Be Small	Self-published	Winner	
2003	Josh Sullivan	Josh Comics		Finalist	
2003	David Lasky and Jesse Reklaw	Lo-Horse #1		Finalist	
2003	Raina Telgemeier	Take Out		Finalist	
2003	Diana Tamblyn	That Thing You Fall Into		Finalist	
2004	Gabrielle Bell	Lucky #3	Self-published	Winner	
2004	Anders Nilsen	Big Questions #6	Self-published	Finalist	
2004	Jim Ottaviani and Roger Langridge	Quantum Entanglement, Spooky Action at a Distance, Teleportation and You	G.T. Labs	Finalist	
2004	Pat Lewis	Thankless Job	Lunchbreak Comics	Finalist	
2004	Matthew Bellisle	Underground: Souvenir	Gravity/DSN	Finalist	
2005	Alec Longstreth	Phase 7	Self-published	Winner	
2005	Jesse Reklaw	Couch Tag #2	Self-published	Finalist	
2005	John Hankiewicz	Dance	Self-published	Finalist	
2005	Andy Hartzell	Monday	Self-published	Finalist	
2005	Sarah Becan	Ouija Interview #3	Self-published	Finalist	
2006	Ken Dahl	Monsters		Winner	
2006	Paulette Poullet	Comicore Jr.		Finalist	
2006	Edie Fake	Gaylord Phoenix #4		Finalist	
2006	Geoff Vasile	Trackrabbit		Finalist	
2006	Dave Lapp	Window #8		Finalist	
2007	Minty Lewis	P.S. Comics #3		Winner	
2007	Jeff Zwirek	Burning Building Comix		Finalist	
2007	Mark Burrier	Noose		Finalist	
2007	Matt Wiegle	Seven More Days of Not Getting Eaten		Finalist	
2007	Shawn Cheng and Sara Edward-Corbett	The Monkey and the Crab		Finalist	
2008	Jesse Reklaw	Jesse Reklaw		Winner	
2008	Lilli Carré	Dorado Park		Finalist	
2008	Sarah Glidden	How To Understand Israel in 60 Days or Less		Finalist	
2008	Jonas Madden-Connor	Ochre Ellipse #2		Finalist	
2008	Juliacks	Swell		Finalist	
2009	Lisa Hanawalt	Stay Away From Other People		Winner	
2009	Onsmith	Claptrap #2		Finalist	
2009	Joey Alison Sayers	Just So You Know #1		Finalist	
2009	Kelly Froh and Max Clotfelter	Stewbrew		Finalist	
2009	Matt Dembicki	Xoc #1		Finalist	
2010	Jim Rugg	Rambo 3.5		Winner	
2010	Lilli Carré	Don't Drink from the Sea		Finalist	
2010	Martin Cendreda	Stories by... Vol. 1		Finalist	
2010	Mike Dawson	Troop 142		Finalist	
2010	Josh Frankel	Water Column #3		Finalist	
2011	Box Brown	Ben Died of a Train		Winner	
2011	Levon Jihanian	Danger Country #1		Finalist	
2011	Edie Fake	Gaylord Phoenix #5		Finalist	
2011	Laura Terry	Morning Song		Finalist	
2011	Tom Kaczynski	Trans-Utopia	Uncivilized Books	Finalist	
2012	Corinne Mucha	The Monkey in the Basement and Other Delusions	Retrofit Comics	Winner	
2012	Grant Reynolds	Hypnotic Induction Technique	Self-published	Finalist	
2012	Calvin Wong	Ramble On #2	Self-published	Finalist	
2012	Mickey Zacchilli	RAV #6	Self-published	Finalist	
2012	Noah Van Sciver	The Death of Elijah Lovejoy	2D Cloud	Finalist	
2013	Charles Forsman	The End of the Fucking World, #16	Fantagraphics	Winner	
2013	Sam Alden	Hawaii 1997	Self-published	Finalist	
2013	Kris Mukai and Zachary Zezima	Il Cammino Delle Capre	Self-published	Finalist	
2013	Joseph Lambert	Lawaway	Self-published	Finalist	
2013	Keiler Roberts	Powdered Milk Vol. 10: The Man Who Could Not Read	Self-published	Finalist	
2014	Sophie Goldstein	House of Women		Winner	
2014	Yumi Sakugawa	Never Forgets	Self-published	Finalist	
2014	Carlos Gonzales	Test Tube #1		Finalist	
2014	Nick Drnaso	The Grassy Knoll		Finalist	
2014	Ian Sampson	Up to the Top		Finalist	
2015	Sophia Foster-Dimino	Sex Fantasy #4		Winner	
2015	Patrick Crotty	Devil's Slice of Life		Finalist	
2015	John Pham	Epoxy 5		Finalist	
2015	John Porcellino	King-Cat Comics #75		Finalist	
2015	Audry	Whalen: A Reckoning		Finalist	
2016	Carolyn Nowak	Radishes		Winner	
2016	Sloane Leong	A Map to the Sun		Finalist	
2016	Pranas T. Naujokaitis	Laffy Meal		Finalist	
2016	Sophie Franz	The Experts		Finalist	
2016	Luke Healy	The Unofficial Cuckoo's Nest		Finalist	
2017	Hazel Newlevant	Tender-Hearted		Winner	
2017	Keren Katz and Geffen Refaeli	Our Tale of Woe		Finalist	
2017	M. Sabine Rear	Reverse Flaneur		Finalist	
2017	Ann Xu	Same Place Same Time		Finalist	
2017	Celine Loup	The Man Who Came Down the Attic Stairs		Finalist	
2018	Shing Yin Khor	Say It With Noodles: On Learning to Speak the Language of Food		Winner	
2018	Maritsa Patrinos	Common Blessings & Common Curses		Finalist	
2018	Margot Ferrick	Dog Nurse		Finalist	
2018	Debbie Fong	Greenhouse		Finalist	
2018	Kevin Reilly	Mothball 88		Finalist	
2019	Emma Jayne	Trans Girls Hit the Town		Winner	
2019	InésEstrada	Cherry		Finalist	
2019	Jed McGowan	Gonzalo		Finalist	
2019	Kriota Willberg	Silver Wire		Finalist	
2019	Mar Julia	YLLW YLLW YLLW		Finalist	
2020	Cathy G. Johnson	Black Hole Heart		Winner	
2020	Theo K. Stultz	Canvas		Finalist	
2020	Keren Katz	Chapter Two		Finalist	
2020	Haleigh Buck	I Feel Weird #4		Finalist	
2020	Nguyen Nguyen	The Gulf		Finalist	
2021	Casey Nowak	Bodyseed		Winner	
2021	Arantza Peña Popo	Lavender Scare		Finalist	
2021	Whit Taylor	Montana Diary		Finalist	
2021	Brendan Leach	Slum Clearance Symphony		Finalist	
2021	Leda Zawacki	The Drain Pipe		Finalist	
2022	Caroline Cash	PeePee PooPoo #69	Self-published	Winner	
2022	Summer Pierre	Carrington's World	Self-published	Finalist	
2022	Maritsa Patrinos	Joy	Self-published	Finalist	
2022	King Ray	Phonestoned	Self-published	Finalist	
2022	Alexander Laird	Sleemor Gank - Burg Land 1	Self-published	Finalist	
2023	Yasmeen Abedifard	Death Bloom	Self-published	Winner	
2023	João Fazenda	Farewell	Self-published	Finalist	
2023	Lee Dean and Salavador Aguilera	Hares on the Mountain	Self-published	Finalist	
2023	Celine Loup	Sacred Grove	Self-published	Finalist	
2023	Gina Wynbrandt	You're the Center of Attention	Kus!	Finalist	
2024	Yuan Song	Manga Cube	Self-published	Winner	
2024	Faye Stacey	Find a Seat	Quindrie Press	Finalist	
2024	Ana Two	Hyper Fawnus	Self-published	Finalist	
2024	Jordan Jeffries	Lullaby	Cosmic Dog House Press	Finalist	
2024	Greer de Maglie	Pauline Newman	Self-published	Finalist	
2025	Violet Kitchen	Allodynia	Self-published	Winner	
2025	A. T. Pratt	Big Apple Matinee	Self-published	Finalist	
2025	Alex Swift	The Connoisseurs	Frog Farm	Finalist	
2025	Arantza Peña Popo	The Mole	Self-published	Finalist	
2025	Jas Hice	Szarlotka	Self-published	Finalist	
2026	Yoko O.K.	Uncoiling: A Japanese-American Family History	Self-published	Winner	
2026	Erika Rier	If She Was Beholden, Could She Ever Be the Beholder?	Self-published	Finalist	
2026	Ingrid Pierre	Secret Black Woman: American Virtues	Self-published	Finalist	
2026	R. D. “Reyookah” Yoon	To Bleed Stone Dry	Self-published	Finalist	
2026	Suerynn Lee	Two Snakes	Alright Editions	Finalist	

== Writers with multiple nominations ==
The following writers have received two or more nominations:

Four

- Jesse Reklaw

Three

- John Porcellino
- Kurt Wolfgang

Two

- Mat Brinkman
- Lilli Carré
- Edie Fake
- John Hankiewicz
- Rachel Hartman
- Keren Katz
- James Kochalka
- Celine Loup
- Maritsa Patrinos
- Arantza Peña Popo
- Androo Robinson
