= Ignatz Award for Promising New Talent =

US comics and cartooning award

Ignatz Award
- Awarded for: Outstanding achievements in comics and cartooning by small press creators or creator-owned projects published by larger publishers
- Location: Bethesda, Maryland
- Country: United States
- Presented by: Ignatz Award Committee
- Hosted by: Small Press Expo
- First award: 1997
- Website: www.smallpressexpo.com/ignatz-awards

The Ignatz Award for Promising New Talent, established in 1997 as part of the Ignatz Awards, is an annual literary award that recognizes outstanding achievements in comics and cartooning by small press creators or creator-owned projects published by larger publishers. The award for promising new talent is presented to new industry artists "whose work deserves more recognition than it currently receives".

== Recipients ==
Award winners and finalists
Year	Creator	Work	Publisher	Result	Ref.
1997	Debbie Drechsler	Nowhere	Drawn & Quarterly	Winner	
1997	Walt Holcombe	King of Persia	Self-published	Finalist	
1997	C. S. Morse	Soulwind	Image Comics	Finalist	
1997	Tom Hart	The Sands	Black Eye Productions	Finalist	
1997	Steve Weissman	Yikes!	Alternative Press	Finalist	
1998	Carla Speed McNeil	Finder	Lightspeed Press	Winner	
1998	Matt Madden	Black Candy	Black Eye Books	Finalist	
1998	Tara Jenkins	Galaxion	Helikon Press	Finalist	
1998	Ron Regé Jr.	Skibber Bee Bye	Self-published	Finalist	
1998	Chris Oliveros	The Envelope Manufacturer	Drawn & Quarterly	Finalist	
1999	Brian Ralph	Fireball #7	Fort Thunder	Winner	
1999	Madison Clell	Cuckoo	Green Door Studios	Finalist	
1999	Dave Kiersh	Is Kissing a Girl Who Smokes Like Kissing an Ashtray, Non #4	Red Ink	Finalist	
1999	Jason Little	Jack's Luck Runs Out	Top Shelf Productions	Finalist	
1999	Leland Myrick	Sweet	Adept Books	Finalist	
2000	Nick Bertozzi	Boswash	Luxurious Comics	Winner	
2000	Stephen Notley	Bob the Angry Flower	Self-published	Finalist	
2000	Ben Catmull	Paper Theater	Self-published	Finalist	
2000	Kevin Huizenga	Supermonster	Self-published	Finalist	
2000	Rod Espinosa	The Courageous Princess	Antarctic Press	Finalist	
2001	2001 Ignatz Awards cancelled after 9-11 Attacks				
2001	Tomer and Asaf Hanuka	Bipolar	Self-published	Finalist	
2001	Mike Kunkel	Herobear and the Kid	Astonish Comics	Finalist	
2001	Metaphrog	Louis: Red Letter Day	Metaphrog	Finalist	
2001	Rutu Modan	Flipper Vol. 2	Actus Tragicus/Top Shelf Productions	Finalist	
2001	Ben Steckler	Get BenT	Self-published	Finalist	
2002	Greg Cook	Catch as Catch Can	Highwater Books	Winner	
2002	Sammy Harkham	"Study Group 12 #2", "Though I Slumber, My Heart Is Still Awake"	Study Group 12	Finalist	
2002	Anders Brekhus Nilsen	Big Questions #4: Asomatognosia	Self-published	Finalist	
2002	Mike Dawson	Cabaret, Gabagool!	Self-published	Finalist	
2002	Jeffrey Brown	Clumsy: A Novel	Self-published	Finalist	
2002	Rick Smith and Tania Menesse	Shuck	Shuck Comics	Finalist	
2003	Derek Kirk Kim	Same Difference and Other Stories	Self-published	Winner	
2003	Marc Bell	Rosetta; Shrimpy & Paul	Alternative Comics; Highwater Books	Finalist	
2003	Ray Friesen	RQW	Don't Eat Any Bugs Comics	Finalist	
2003	Raina Telgemeier	Take Out	Self-published	Finalist	
2003	John Hankiewicz	Tepid, Eleanor E. Is Home	Self-published	Finalist	
2004	Lauren Weinstein	Kramers Ergot #4	Avodah Books	Winner	
2004	Svetlana Chmakova	Chasing Rainbows	www.girlamatic.com, www.svetlania.com	Finalist	
2004	Martin Cendreda	Hi-Horse Omnibus	Alternative Comics, Hi-Horse Comics	Finalist	
2004	Leland Purvis	Suspended in Language	G.T. Labs	Finalist	
2004	Dan James	The Octopi and the Ocean	Top Shelf Productions	Finalist	
2005	Andy Runton	Owly	Top Shelf Productions	Winner	
2005	Karl Stevens	Guilty	Karl Stevens Publishing, dist. by Alternative Comics	Finalist	
2005	Rebecca Dart	RabbitHead	Alternative Comics	Finalist	
2005	Joshua W. Cotter	Skyscrapers of the Midwest	AdHouse Books	Finalist	
2005	Vanessa Davis	Spaniel Rage	Buenaventura Press	Finalist	
2006	Hope Larson	Salamander Dream; Gray Horses	AdHouse Books; Oni Press	Winner	
2006	Ben Jones	BJ & Da Dogs	Picturebox, Inc.	Finalist	
2006	Jonathan Bennett	Mome Fall 2005	Fantagraphics Books	Finalist	
2006	Andrice Arp	Mome Winter 2006	Fantagraphics Books	Finalist	
2006	R. Kikuo Johnson	Night Fisher	Fantagraphics Books	Finalist	
2007	Tom Neely	The Blot	I Will Destroy You	Winner	
2007	Scott Campbell	Flight Vol. 4; Hickee, vol. 3 #3	Ballantine Books; Alternative Comics	Finalist	
2007	Brandon Graham	King City	TokyoPop	Finalist	
2007	Gabrielle Bell	Lucky, Drawn & Quarterly Showcase Vol. 4	Drawn & Quarterly	Finalist	
2007	Lilli Carré	Papercutter #3; You Ain't No Dancer Vol. 2	Tugboat Press; New Reliable Press	Finalist	
2008	Sarah Glidden	How to Understand Israel in 60 Days or Less	Self-published	Winner	
2008	Chuck Forsman	Snake Oil #1	Self-published	Finalist	
2008	Lars Martinson	Tonoharu	Pliant Press/Top Shelf Productions	Finalist	
2008	Oliver East	Trains Are... Mint	Blank Slate	Finalist	
2008	Austin English	Windy Corner #2	Sparkplug Comic Books	Finalist	
2009	Colleen Frakes	Woman King	Self-published	Winner	
2009	T. Edward Bak	Drawn & Quarterly Showcase Book 5	Drawn & Quarterly	Finalist	
2009	Amanda Vähämäki	Drawn & Quarterly Showcase Book 5	Drawn & Quarterly	Finalist	
2009	Hellen Jo	Jin & Jam #1; "Diamond Heights", Papercutter #9	Sparkplug; Tugboat	Finalist	
2009	Ed Luce	Wuvable Oaf	Self-published	Finalist	
2010	Matt Wiegle	"The Orphan Baiter", Papercutter #13	Tugboat Press	Winner	
2010	Rami Efal	Never Forget, Never Forgive	Studio Namu	Finalist	
2010	Sully	The Hipless Boy	Conundrum Press	Finalist	
2010	Rina Ayuyang	Whirlwind Wonderland	Sparkplug Comic Books & Tugboat Press	Finalist	
2010	Blaise Larmee	Young Lions	Self-published	Finalist	
2011	Darryl Ayo Brathwaite	House of Twelve Monthly #3	Comixology	Winner	
2011	Jon McNaught	Birchfield Close	Nobrow Press	Finalist	
2011	Jesse Jacobs	Even the Giants	AdHouse	Finalist	
2011	Tony Breed	Finn and Charlie are Hitched	Self-published	Finalist	
2011	Jesse Moynihan	Forming	Nobrow/online	Finalist	
2012	Lale Westvind	Hot Dog Beach	Self-published	Winner	
2012	Lila Quintero Weaver	Dark Room: A Memoir in Black and White	University of Alabama Press	Finalist	
2012	Lauren Barnett	Me Likes You Very Much	Hic & Hoc Publications	Finalist	
2012	Tessa Brunton	Passage	Sparkplug Books	Finalist	
2012	Clara Besijelle	The Lobster King	Self-published	Finalist	
2013	Sam Alden	Hawaii 1997 & Haunter	Self-published	Winner	
2013	Angie Wang	"The Teacup Tree", Secret Prison #7	Self-published	Finalist	
2013	Diana Thung	August Moon	Top Shelf	Finalist	
2013	Nathan Bulmer	Eat More Bikes	Koyama Press	Finalist	
2013	Philippa Rice	Looking Out	Hic & Hoc Publications	Finalist	
2014	Cathy G. Johnson	Jeremiah; Boy Genius; Until It Runs Clear		Winner	
2014	Daryl Seitchik	Missy		Finalist	
2014	Nick Offerman	Orange; Onions		Finalist	
2014	Keiler Roberts	Powdered Milk (series)		Finalist	
2014	Luke Howard	Trevor		Finalist	
2015	Sophia Foster-Dimino	Sphincter; Sex Fantasy		Winner	
2015	Gina Wynbrandt	Big Pussy		Finalist	
2015	Dakota McFadzean	Don't Get Eaten by Anything		Finalist	
2015	M. Dean	K.M. & R.P. & MCMLXXI (1971)		Finalist	
2015	Jane Mai	Soft		Finalist	
2016	Tillie Walden	I Love This Part		Winner	
2016	Kevin Budnik	Handbook		Finalist	
2016	Carolyn Nowak	Radishes		Finalist	
2016	Sara Lautman	The Ultimate Laugh, Grape Nuts		Finalist	
2016	Maia Kobabe	Tom O'Bedlam		Finalist	
2017	Bianca Xunise	"Say Her Name", The Nib		Winner	
2017	Aud Koch	"Run", Oath Anthology		Finalist	
2017	Isabella Rotman	Long Black Veil		Finalist	
2017	Kelly Bastow	Year Long Summer		Finalist	
2017	Margot Ferrick	Yours		Finalist	
2018	Yasmin Omar Ata	Mis(h)adra		Winner	
2018	Tara Booth	How to Be Alive		Finalist	
2018	Rumi Hara	Nori and The Rabbits of the Moon		Finalist	
2018	Xia Gordon	The Fashion of 2004, Harvest		Finalist	
2018	Tommi Parrish	The Lie and How We Told It		Finalist	
2019	Ebony Flowers	My Lil Sister Lena		Winner	
2019	Kelsey Wroten	Crimes		Finalist	
2019	Haleigh Buck	I Feel Weird #3		Finalist	
2019	Emma Jayne	Trans Girls Hit the Town		Finalist	
2019	Mar Julia	YLLW YLLW YLLW		Finalist	
2020	Theo Stultz	Canvas		Winner	
2020	Emil Wilson	(Probably) the Last Time		Finalist	
2020	Sylvia Nickerson	Creation		Finalist	
2020	AJ Dungo	In Waves		Finalist	
2020	Andrew Lorenzi	Multo		Finalist	
2021	Pa-Luis	We Live on Earth		Winner	
2021	Royal Dunlap	b.b. free		Finalist	
2021	Tess Scilipoti	Do You Think I Look Like a Girl?		Finalist	
2021	Nico Harriman	Mr. H: Portrait of a High School Art Teacher		Finalist	
2021	Zoe Maeve	The Gift		Finalist	
2022	Juni Ba	Djeliya	TKO Studios	Winner	
2022	Yara Elfouly	Archeologist Landings	Self-published	Finalist	
2022	Trinidad Escobar	Arrive In My Hands	Black Josei Press	Finalist	
2022	Juniper Kim	Koreans Sing in English	Self-published	Finalist	
2022	Emma Grove	The Third Person	Drawn & Quarterly	Finalist	
2023	Deb JJ Lee	In Limbo	First Second	Winner	
2023	Richard Mercado	I Owe it to My Parents to NOT Come Out	Self-published	Finalist	
2023	Leo Fox	My Body Unspooling	Self-published	Finalist	
2023	Grayson Bear	Pokey	Bred Press	Finalist	
2023	Shanti Ray	Sennen	Avery Hill Publishing	Finalist	
2024	Léa Murawiec	The Great Beyond	Drawn & Quarterly	Winner	
2024	Cole Degenstein	10-10 To The Wind	Fieldmouse Press	Finalist	
2024	Pingnan Lu	Gift Box	Self-published	Finalist	
2024	Xiang Yata	Optometry	Driftwood Press	Finalist	
2024	Hugo Canuto	Tales of the Orishas	Abrams	Finalist	
2025	Vicky Yang	Unmoored	Self-published	Winner	
2025	Trishelle Jeffery	Best Breasts in the West	Fieldmouse Press	Finalist	
2025	Mili St. John	The Edge of Autumn	Self-published	Finalist	
2025	Ricky Lima and Daniele Aquilani	Undergrowth	Top Shelf Productions	Finalist	
2025	Connie Meyers	Big Gamble Rainbow Highway	CRAM books	Finalist	
2026	Oscar Woodiwiss	A Scientific Study of Transsexuality	Fieldmouse Press	Winner	
2026	Sam Hensley	Creamthing In His Golden Year	Self-published	Finalist	
2026	Ansel Kite	Electric Cowboy	Silver Sprocket	Finalist	
2026	Donya Todd	The Witch’s Egg	Avery Hill Publishing	Finalist	
2026	Padraig Campbell	Upwards Incursion	Driftwood Press	Finalist	
