= Ignatz Award for Outstanding Anthology or Collection =

US comics and cartooning award

- Awarded for: Outstanding achievements in comics and cartooning by small press creators or creator-owned projects published by larger publishers
- Location: Bethesda, Maryland
- Country: United States
- Presented by: Ignatz Award Committee
- Hosted by: Small Press Expo
- First award: 2005
- Final award: 2016
- Website: www.smallpressexpo.com/ignatz-awards

The Ignatz Award for Outstanding Anthology or Collection (2005–2016) was an annual literary award recognizing outstanding achievements in comics and cartooning by small press creators or creator-owned projects published by larger publishers. The award was established in 2005 after the Ignatz Award for Outstanding Graphic Novel or Collection was split into two awards; the award was then split into the Ignatz Award for Outstanding Anthology and Ignatz Award for Outstanding Collection in 2017.

== Recipients ==
Outstanding Anthology or Collection award winners and finalists
Year	Creator(s)	Title	Publisher	Result	Ref.
2005	John Porcellino	Diary of a Mosquito Abatement Man	La Mano	Winner	
2005	James Sturm	Above and Below: Two Tales of the American Frontier	Drawn & Quarterly	Finalist	
2005	Actus (ed.)	Dead Herring Comics	Actus Independent Comics	Finalist	
2005	Roger Langridge	Fred the Clown	Fantagraphics Books	Finalist	
2005	Tom Hart	Hutch Owen: Unmarketable	Top Shelf Productions	Finalist	
2006	Charles Burns	Black Hole	Pantheon	Winner	
2006	Linda Medley	Castle Waiting	Fantagraphics Books	Finalist	
2006	Matt Broersma, Geneviève Castrée, and Sammy Harkham	Drawn & Quarterly Showcase #3	Drawn & Quarterly	Finalist	
2006	Megan Kelso	Squirrel Mother	Fantagraphics Books	Finalist	
2006	Yoshihiro Tatsumi	The Push Man and Other Stories	Drawn & Quarterly	Finalist	
2007	Kevin Huizenga	Curses	Drawn & Quarterly	Winner	
2007	Gabrielle Bell, Martin Cendrera, and Dan Zettwoch	Drawn & Quarterly Showcase Vol. 4	Drawn & Quarterly	Finalist	
2007	John Porcellino	King-Cat Classics	Drawn & Quarterly	Finalist	
2007	Ivan Brunetti	Misery Loves Comedy	Fantagraphics Books	Finalist	
2007	Tove Jansson	Moomin Book One	Drawn & Quarterly	Finalist	
2008	Greg Means (ed.)	Papercutter #7	Tugboat Press	Winner	
2008	Chris Wright	Inkweed	Sparkplug Comic Books	Finalist	
2008	John Stanley	Little Lulu Vol. 18	Dark Horse	Finalist	
2008	John Broadley	Pond Life	PictureBox	Finalist	
2008	Austin English (ed.)	Windy Corner #2	Sparkplug Comic Books	Finalist	
2009	Sammy Harkham (ed.)	Kramers Ergot #7	Buenaventura	Winner	
2009	Tim Lane	Abandoned Cars	Fantagraphics	Finalist	
2009	Ron Regé Jr.	Against Pain	Drawn & Quarterly	Finalist	
2009	T. Edward Bak, Anneli Furmark, Amanda Vähämäki	Drawn & Quarterly Showcase Book 5	Drawn & Quarterly	Finalist	
2009	Ted Stearn	Fuzz and Pluck: Splitsville	Fantagraphics	Finalist	
2010	R. Sikoryak	Masterpiece Comics	Drawn & Quarterly	Winner	
2010	David King	Lemon Styles	Sparkplug Comic Books	Finalist	
2010	Susumu Katsumata	Red Snow	Drawn & Quarterly	Finalist	
2010	Jesse Reklaw	Ten Thousand Things to Do	Self-published	Finalist	
2010	Sully	The Hipless Boy	Conundrum Press	Finalist	
2011	Joseph Lambert	I Will Bite You	Secret Acres	Winner	
2011	Ryan Standfest (ed.)	Black Eye	Rotland Press	Finalist	
2011	Annie Murphy (ed.)	Gay Genius	Sparkplug	Finalist	
2011	Vanessa Davis	Make Me a Woman	Drawn & Quarterly	Finalist	
2011	Robert Kirby (ed.)	Three #1		Finalist	
2012	Kate Beaton	Hark! A Vagrant	Drawn & Quarterly	Winner	
2012	Anders Nilsen	Big Questions	Drawn & Quarterly	Finalist	
2012	Various artists	Nobrow #6	Nobrow	Finalist	
2012	Inés Estrada	Ojitos Borrosos	Self-published	Finalist	
2012	Olivier Schrauwen	The Man Who Grew His Beard	Fantagraphics Books	Finalist	
2013	Michael DeForge	Very Casual	Koyama Press	Winner	
2013	Lynda Barry	Freddie Stories	Drawn & Quarterly	Finalist	
2013	Lilli Carré	Heads or Tails	Fantagraphics Books	Finalist	
2013	Peter Bagge	Peter Bagge's Other Stuff	Fantagraphics Books	Finalist	
2013	Austin English (ed.)	Tusen Hjärtan Stark #1	Domino Books	Finalist	
2014	Robert Kirby (ed.)	QU33R		Winner	
2014	Kevin Huizenga and Dan Zettwoch	Amazing Facts and Beyond		Finalist	
2014	Leslie Stein	Eye of the Majestic Creature (Vol. 2)		Finalist	
2014	Tony Millionaire	Sock Monkey Treasury		Finalist	
2014	Anders Nilsen	The End		Finalist	
2015	Eleanor Davis	How To Be Happy		Winner	
2015	Tom Devlin, Chris Oliveros, Peggy Burns, Tracy Hurren, and Julia Pohl-Miranda (producers)	25 Years of Contemporary Cartooning, Comics, and Graphic Novel	Drawn & Quarterly	Finalist	
2015	Box Brown	An Entity Observes All Things	Retrofit Comics/Big Planet Comics	Finalist	
2015	Ethan Rilly	Pope Hats #4		Finalist	
2015	Jillian Tamaki	SuperMutant Magic Academy		Finalist	
2016	Kate Beaton	Step Aside Pops		Winner	
2016	Nick Drnaso	Beverly		Finalist	
2016	Sfé R. Monster and Taneka Stotts	Beyond: The Queer Sci Fi and Fantasy Anthology		Finalist	
2016	Adrian Tomine	Killing And Dying		Finalist	
2016	Trina Robbins	The Complete Wimmen's Comix		Finalist	

== Writers with multiple nominations ==
The following writers have received two or more nominations:

Two

- Kate Beaton
- Sammy Harkham
- Dan Zettwoch
- Austin English
- Kevin Huizenga
- Robert Kirby
- Anders Nilsen
- John Porcellino
