= Ignatz Award for Outstanding Comic =

US comics and cartooning award

Ignatz Award
- Awarded for: Outstanding achievements in comics and cartooning by small press creators or creator-owned projects published by larger publishers
- Location: Bethesda, Maryland
- Country: United States
- Presented by: Ignatz Award Committee
- Hosted by: Small Press Expo
- First award: 1997
- Website: www.smallpressexpo.com/ignatz-awards

The Ignatz Award for Outstanding Comic, established in 1997 as part of the Ignatz Awards, is an annual literary award that recognizes outstanding achievements in comics and cartooning by small press creators or creator-owned projects published by larger publishers. The award for outstanding comic is presented to a single issue of a comic with excellent art and story; eligible comics must be "professionally published in the traditional floppy comic format familiar to superhero comics".

== Recipients ==
Award winners and finalists
Year	Creator	Work	Publication	Result	Ref.
1997	Daniel Clowes	Eightball #17	Fantagraphics	Winner	
1997	Pete Sickman-Garner	Hey Mister #1	Top Shelf Productions	Finalist	
1997	Dean Haspiel and Josh Neufeld	Keyhole #2	Modern	Finalist	
1997	Walt Holcombe	King of Persia	Self-published through Accordion Press	Finalist	
1997	Seth	Palookaville #10	Drawn & Quarterly	Finalist	
1998	Chris Ware	Acme Novelty Library #9	Fantagraphics	Winner	
1998	Bill Willingham	Coventry #1	Fantagraphics	Finalist	
1998	Daniel Clowes	Eightball #19	Fantagraphics	Finalist	
1998	Debbie Drechsler	Nowhere #3	Drawn & Quarterly	Finalist	
1998	Joe Sacco	Stories from Bosnia #1: Soba	Drawn & Quarterly	Finalist	
1999	Frank Cho	Liberty Meadows #1	Insight Studio Group	Winner	
1999	Harvey Pekar, Joe Sacco, Frank Stack, and Colin Warneford	American Splendor	Transatlantic Comics	Finalist	
1999	James Sturm	Hundreds of Feet Below Daylight	Drawn & Quarterly	Finalist	
1999	Joe Zabel and Gary Dumm	Oracle	Amazing Montage	Finalist	
1999	Ben Katchor	The Jew of New York	Pantheon Books	Finalist	
2000	Chris Ware	Acme Novelty Library #13	Fantagraphics Books	Winner	
2000	Ron Regé Jr. and Joan Leidy	Boys	Highwater Books	Finalist	
2000	Madison Clell	Cuckoo #10	Green Door Studios	Finalist	
2000	Pete Sickman-Garner	Hey Mister, The Trouble With Jesus	Top Shelf Productions	Finalist	
2000	Jordan Crane	The Last Lonely Saturday	Red Ink	Finalist	
2001	2001 Ignatz Awards cancelled after 9-11 Attacks				
2001	Jim Woodring	Frank #4	Fantagraphics Books	Finalist	
2001	Mike Kunkel	Herobear and the Kid #2	Astonish Comics	Finalist	
2001	James Kochalka	Sketchbook Diaries	Top Shelf Productions	Finalist	
2001	Jason	Mjau Mjau #7	Jippi Forlag	Finalist	
2001	Paul Hornschemeier	Sequential #6	I Don't Get It Press	Finalist	
2002	Daniel Clowes	Eightball #22	Fantagraphics Books	Winner	
2002	Anders Brekhus Nilsen	Big Questions #4: Asomatognosia	Self-published	Finalist	
2002	Tony Consiglio	Double Cross: More or Less	Top Shelf Productions	Finalist	
2002	James Kochalka	Sketchbook Diaries, Vol. 2	Top Shelf Productions	Finalist	
2002	Jon Lewis	True Swamp: Stoneground and Hillbound	Alternative Comics	Finalist	
2003	Nick Bertozzi	Rubber Necker #2	Alternative Comics	Winner	
2003	Adam Suerte	Aprendiz, Book 1	Self-published	Finalist	
2003	Charles Burns	Black Hole #10	Fantagraphics Books	Finalist	
2003	David Collier	Collier'sm Vol. 2 #2	Drawn & Quarterly	Finalist	
2003	David Lasky and Greg Stump	Urban Hipster #2	Alternative Comics	Finalist	
2004	Daniel Clowes	Eightball #23	Fantagraphics Books	Winner	
2004	Charles Burns	Black Hole #11	Fantagraphics Books	Finalist	
2004	John Porcellino	King Cat #62	Self-published	Finalist	
2004	Kim Deitch	Stuff of Dreams #2	Fantagraphics Books	Finalist	
2004	John Hankiewicz	Tepid Summer 2003	Tepid Comics	Finalist	
2005	Kevin Huizenga	Or Else #1	Drawn & Quarterly	Winner	
2005	Anders Nilsen	Dogs & Water	Drawn & Quarterly	Finalist	
2005	Hernández brothers	Love & Rockets #12	Fantagraphics	Finalist	
2005	Hernández brothers	Love & Rockets #13	Fantagraphics	Finalist	
2005	Marc Bell	Worn Tuff Elbow #1	Fantagraphics	Finalist	
2006	Ivan Brunetti	Schizo #4	Fantagraphics Books	Winner	
2006	Anders Nilsen	Big Questions #7	Drawn & Quarterly	Finalist	
2006	Kevin Huizenga	Ganges #1	Fantagraphics Books	Finalist	
2006	Adrian Tomine	Optic Nerve #10	Drawn & Quarterly	Finalist	
2006	Kim Deitch	Stuff of Dreams #3	Fantagraphics Books	Finalist	
2007	Adrian Tomine	Optic Nerve #11	Drawn & Quarterly	Winner	
2007	Adam McGovern and Paolo Leandri	Doctor Id	Indie Ink Studios	Finalist	
2007	Ted Stearn	Fuzz & Pluck in Splitsville #4	Fantagraphics Books	Finalist	
2007	Hernández brothers	Love & Rockets, vol. 2 #18	Fantagraphics Books	Finalist	
2007	Ben Catmull	Monster Parade #1	Fantagraphics Books	Finalist	
2008	Chuck Forsman	Snake Oil #1	Self-published	Winner	
2008	Gerald Jablonski	Cryptic Wit #2	Self-published	Finalist	
2008	Dunya Jankovic	Department of Art	Self-published	Finalist	
2008	Gabrielle Bell	Lucky Vol. 2 #2	Drawn & Quarterly	Finalist	
2008	Seth	Palookaville #19	Drawn & Quarterly	Finalist	
2009	Jordan Crane	Uptight #3	Fantagraphics	Winner	
2009	David King	Danny Dutch #1	Sparkplug	Finalist	
2009	Jason T. Miles	Dead Ringer	La Mano	Finalist	
2009	Gabriella Giandelli	Interiorae #3	Fantagraphics/Coconino	Finalist	
2009	Elijah Brubaker	Reich #6	Sparkplug	Finalist	
2010	Lisa Hanawalt	I Want You	Buenaventura Press	Winner	
2010	Noah Van Sciver	Blammo #6	Kilgore Books	Finalist	
2010	Robert Sergel	Eschew #2	Sparkplug Comic Books	Finalist	
2010	Julia Gfrörer	Flesh and Bone	Sparkplug Comic Books	Finalist	
2010	John Pham	Sublife #2	Fantagraphics Books	Finalist	
2011	Michael DeForge	Lose #3	Koyama Press	Winner	
2011	Sammy Harkham	Crickets #3	Self-published	Finalist	
2011	Levon Jihanian	Danger Country #1		Finalist	
2011	Dunja Jankovic	Habitat #2		Finalist	
2011	Marian Runk	The Magic Hedge		Finalist	
2012	Brendan Leach	Pterodactyl Hunters	Top Shelf	Winner	
2012	Lale Westvind	Hot Dog Beach #2	Self-published	Finalist	
2012	Tessa Brunton	Passage	Sparkplug Books	Finalist	
2012	Ethan Rilly	Pope Hats #2	AdHouse Books	Finalist	
2012	Brian Hurtt and Cullen Bunn	The Sixth Gun #17	Oni Press	Finalist	
2013	Ethan Rilly	Pope Hats #3	AdHouse Books	Winner	
2013	Lale Westvind	Hyperspeed to Nowhere	Self-published	Finalist	
2013	Philippa Rice	Looking Out	Hic & Hoc Publications	Finalist	
2013	Simon Hanselmann	St. Owl's Bay	Self-published	Finalist	
2013	Austin English	The Life Problem	Drippybone Books	Finalist	
2014	Sam Alden	Wicked Chicken Queen	Retrofit Comics/Big Planet Comics	Winner	
2014	Noah Van Sciver	Blammo #8		Finalist	
2014	Dash Shaw	Cosplayers		Finalist	
2014	Farel Dalrymple	It Will All Hurt #2		Finalist	
2014	Adam Buttrick	Misliving Amended		Finalist	
2015	Sophie Goldstein	The Oven		Winner	
2015	Jason Little	Borb		Finalist	
2015	Ethan Rilly	Pope Hats #4		Finalist	
2015	Disa Wallander	The Nature of Nature		Finalist	
2015	Kris Mukai	Weeping Flower, Grows in Darkness		Finalist	
2016	Sam Bosma	Fantasy Sports #1		Winner	
2016	Melanie Gillman	As the Crow Flies		Finalist	
2016	John Martz	Be Good		Finalist	
2016	Daniel Clowes	Patience		Finalist	
2016	Kim Deitch	"Shrine of the Monkey God", Kramers Ergot 9		Finalist	
2017	Ben Passmore	Your Black Friend		Winner	
2017	Karine Bernadou	Canopy		Finalist	
2017	Eleanor Davis	Libby's Dad		Finalist	
2017	Lilah Sturges, Dave Justus, Steve Rolston, and Annie Wu	Public Relations #10		Finalist	
2017	Keiler Roberts	Sunburning		Finalist	
2018	Tara Booth	Hot to Be Alive		Winner	
2018	Yao Xiao	Baopu		Finalist	
2018	Freddy Carrasco	Hot Summer Nights		Finalist	
2018	Alyssa Berg	Recollection		Finalist	
2018	Jerry Moriarty	Whatsa Paintoonist		Finalist	
2019	Ngozi Ukazu	Check, Please!		Winner	
2019	Liz Suburbia	Egg Cream		Finalist	
2019	Pidge	Infinite Wheat Paste #7		Finalist	
2019	Benji Nate	Lorna		Finalist	
2019	Joshua Paddon and Matthew Hoddy	The Saga of Metalbeard		Finalist	
2020	Ariel Ries	Cry Wolf Girl		Winner	
2020	Hannah Templer	Cosmoknights		Finalist	
2020	Wendy Xu and Suzanne Walker	Mooncakes		Finalist	
2020	Gabrielle Bell	My Dog Ivy		Finalist	
2020	Josh Bayer	Theth Tomorrow Forever		Finalist	
2021	Ashanti Fortson	Leaf Lace		Winner	
2021	Adam Szym	A Cordial Invitation		Finalist	
2021	EA Bethea	Francis Bacon		Finalist	
2021	Maddi Gonzalez	Rhapsodie		Finalist	
2021	Dominique Duong	The Dog & The Cat		Finalist	
2022	Xulia Vicente	I See A Knight	Shortbox	Winner	
2022	Alex Nall	Are Comic Books Real?	Self-published	Finalist	
2022	K Czap	Four Years Collected: Vol 2	Czap Books	Finalist	
2022	Jamila Rowser and Trinidad Escobar	Ode to Keisha	Black Josei Press	Finalist	
2022	Caroline Cash	PeePee PooPoo #69	Self-published	Finalist	
2023	Daisy Ruiz	Gordita: Built Like This	Black Josei Press	Winner	
2023	Gabriel Howell	Forget Me Not	Secret Acres	Finalist	
2023	Ciara Quilty-Harper	Lemon Yellow	Kus!	Finalist	
2023	Ross Jackson	Live Rock Part 1: Aquarium Life	Secret Room Press	Finalist	
2023	A ee mi	Platonic Love	Paradise Systems	Finalist	
2024	Leo Fox	My Body Unspooling	Silver Sprocket	Winner	
2024	Kevin Huizenga	Fielder #2	Drawn & Quarterly	Finalist	
2024	Daryl Seitchik	Follow the Doll #2	Parsifal Press	Finalist	
2024	Keezy Young	Sunflowers	Silver Sprocket	Finalist	
2024	Audra Stang	The Audra Show #7: The Love Issue	Self-published	Finalist	
2025	Anders Nilsen	Tongues Supplement #1	NoMiracles	Winner	
2025	Madeline Mouse	Belly Full of Heart	Silver Sprocket	Finalist	
2025	Connie Meyers	Big Gamble Rainbow Highway	CRAM Books	Finalist	
2025	O. Stevens	Lucky Cap Scouts	Silver Sprocket	Finalist	
2025	Chad Bilyeu and Juliette de Wit	The Re-Up #6	Bistro Books	Finalist	
2026	Anand Shenoy	Zoo #5	Self-published	Winner	
2026	Dean Haspiel	Antimatter #1	Self-published	Finalist	
2026	Whit Taylor	Fizzle #6	Radiator Comics	Finalist	
2026	Katie Lane	Girls Gone Wild	2dcloud	Finalist	
2026	Josh Bayer	Utzy and Dusty	Domino Books	Finalist	

== Writers with multiple wins ==
The following writers have won the award more than once:

Three

- Daniel Clowes

Two

- Chris Ware

== Writers with multiple nominations ==
The following writers have received two or more nominations:

Five

- Daniel Clowes

Four

- Anders Nilsen

Three

- Kim Deitch
- Hernández brothers
- Kevin Huizenga
- Ethan Rilly

Two

- Josh Bayer
- Gabrielle Bell
- Charles Burns
- Jordan Crane
- Dunja Jankovic
- James Kochalka
- Joe Sacco
- Seth
- Pete Sickman-Garner
- Adrian Tomine
- Noah Van Sciver
- Chris Ware
- Lale Westvind
