= Ignatz Awards =

US comics and cartooning award

Ignatz Award
- Awarded for: Outstanding achievements in comics and cartooning by small press creators or creator-owned projects published by larger publishers
- Location: Bethesda, Maryland
- Country: United States
- Presented by: Ignatz Award Committee
- Hosted by: Small Press Expo
- First award: 1997
- Website: www.smallpressexpo.com/ignatz-awards

The Ignatz Awards recognize outstanding achievements in comics and cartooning by small press creators or creator-owned projects published by larger publishers. They have been awarded each year at the Small Press Expo since 1997, only skipping a year in 2001 due to the show's cancellation after the September 11 attacks. As of 2014 SPX has been held in either Bethesda, North Bethesda, or Silver Spring, Maryland.

The Ignatz Awards are named in honour of George Herriman and his strip Krazy Kat, which featured a brick-throwing mouse named Ignatz.

== Awards criteria ==
As one of the few festival awards rewarded in comics, the Ignatz Awards are voted on by attendees of the annual Small Press Expo (SPX, or The Expo, its corporate name), a weekend convention and tradeshow showcasing creator-owned comics. Nominations for the Ignatz Awards are made by a five-member jury panel consisting of comic book professionals.

The jury panel remains anonymous (from both the public as well as each other) until the announcement of the awards. After a 1999 controversy involving juror Frank Cho, (Note: As a 1999 juror, Cho nominated his own book Liberty Meadows (which ended up winning two 1999 Ignatzes, for Outstanding Artist and Outstanding Comic). Ed Brubaker, one of the original jurors and developers of the award, criticized that year's jury for their lack of support and acknowledgment of independent works, and for allowing self-nomination. Brubaker also questioned whether the guidelines he and Expo board member Chris Oarr had developed for the Awards were provided to that year's judges. Cho defended his decision, stating that in his opinion few of the submissions he received as a judge were deserving of nomination, and that the Ignatz coordinator he consulted instructed him to use his own judgment, as there were no rules against self-nomination.) jurors are now prohibited from nominating their own work. However, there is no prohibition of one jury member's work being nominated for an award by his or her fellow jurors.

== History ==
The first comics industry awards given the title "Ignatz" originated at the OrlandoCon, held in Orlando, Florida, from 1974 to 1994. The current Ignatz Awards are not connected with OrlandoCon. The SPX Ignatz Awards were conceived in 1996 by SPX organizer Chris Oarr and cartoonist Ed Brubaker. Their original mandate, to set the Ignatz apart from "mainstream" awards like the Eisner Awards, was that the work nominated be creator-owned, and focus more on work done by a single writer/artist.

The Award was administered by Jeff Alexander from 1998 to 2006, when they were taken over by Greg McElhatton. During his tenure as Ignatz Award Coordinator, Alexander drew a strip for the annual award program in George Herriman's style.

== Award categories ==
The Ignatz is awarded in the following categories:

- Outstanding Artist
- Outstanding Anthology (added in 2017)
- Outstanding Collection (added in 2017)
- Outstanding Graphic Novel (added in 2005)
- Outstanding Story
- Promising New Talent
- Outstanding Series
- Outstanding Comic
- Outstanding Minicomic
- Outstanding Online Comic (added in 2001)

=== Discontinued categories ===
- Outstanding Graphic Novel or Collection (1997–2004, replaced in 2005 by two separate awards)
- Outstanding Debut Comic (2000–2008)
- Outstanding Anthology or Collection (2005–2016, replaced in 2017 by two separate awards)

== Award winners ==
=== Outstanding Artist ===
Outstanding Artist award winners
| Year | Author | Work | Publisher | Ref. |
|---|---|---|---|---|
| 1997 | Seth | Palookaville | Drawn & Quarterly | |
| 1998 | Dave Sim | Cerebus | Aardvark-Vanaheim | |
| 1999 | Frank Cho | Liberty Meadows #1 | Insight Studios Group | |
| 2000 | Dave Cooper | Weasel | Fantagraphics Books | |
| 2001 | 2001 Ignatz Awards cancelled after 9-11 Attacks | | | |
| 2002 | Megan Kelso | Artichoke Tales #1; Non #5 | Highwater Books; Red Ink Press | |
| 2003 | Jason Little | Shutterbug Follies | Doubleday Graphic Novels | |
| 2004 | Craig Thompson | Blankets | Top Shelf Productions | |
| 2005 | David B | Epileptic; Babel | Pantheon; Drawn & Quarterly | |
| 2006 | Tony Millionaire | Billy Hazelnuts | Fantagraphics Books | |
| 2007 | Jaime Hernández | Love & Rockets | Fantagraphics Books | |
| 2008 | Laura Park | Do Not Disturb My Waking Dream | Self-published | |
| 2009 | Nate Powell | Swallow Me Whole | Top Shelf | |
| 2010 | Eddie Campbell | Alec: The Years Have Pants (A Life-Sized Omnibus) | Top Shelf Productions | |
| 2011 | Joseph Lambert | I Will Bite You | Secret Acres | |
| 2012 | Jaime Hernández | Love and Rockets: New Stories | Fantagraphics Books | |
| 2013 | Michael DeForge | Lose #4 | Koyama Press | |
| 2014 | Sam Bosma | Fantasy Basketball | | |
| 2015 | E. M. Carroll | Through The Woods | | |
| 2016 | Tillie Walden | The End of Summer | | |
| 2017 | Emil Ferris | My Favorite Thing Is Monsters | | |
| 2018 | Richie Pope | That Box We Sit On | | |
| 2019 | Rosemary Valero-O'Connell | Laura Dean Keeps Breaking Up with Me | | |
| 2020 | Rosemary Valero-O'Connell | Don't Go Without Me | | |
| 2021 | Lee Lai | Stone Fruit | | |
| 2022 | Reimena Yee | Alexander, the Servant & the Water of Life | Hiveworks Comics | |
| 2023 | Olivia Stephens | Darlin' and Her Other Names | Self-published | |
| 2024 | Robyn Smith | "Night Fever" from Gladiolus Magazine #1 | Black Josei Press | |
| 2025 | Anders Nilsen | Tongues Supplement #1 | NoMiracles | |
| 2026 | Carol Tyler | The Ephemerata: Shaping the Exquisite Nature of Grief | Fantagraphics | |

=== Outstanding Anthology ===
Outstanding Anthology award winners
| Year | Editor(s) | Title | Ref. |
|---|---|---|---|
| 2017 | Taneka Stotts | Elements: Fire – An Anthology by Creators of Color (Note: After winning, Stotts arranged to have her Ignatz Award smashed with a sledgehammer, and the shards individually mounted onto separate wooden bases with engraved nameplates, so that she could give a piece of the award to each of the contributors to her anthology.) | |
| 2018 | Hazel Newlevant, Whit Taylor, and Ø.K. Fox | Comics for Choice | |
| 2019 | Tara Avery and Jeanne Thornton | We're Still Here: An All-Trans Comics Anthology | |
| 2020 | The Nib | Be Gay, Do Comics | |
| 2021 | | Glaeolia 2 | |
| 2022 | Michael Sweater and Benji Nate | Good Boy Magazine #1 | |
| 2023 | Allison O'Toole and Ashanti Fortson | Shades of Fear | |
| 2024 | Jenn Woodall, Jon Iñaki, Jonathan Rotsztain, Mitch Lohmeier, and Paterson Hodgson | Pulping | |
| 2025 | Sean Knickerbocker | Rust Belt Review vol. 6 | |
| 2026 | Ronald Wimberly | LAAB: A Comics Anthology No. 3 | |

=== Outstanding Collection ===
Outstanding Collection award winners
| Year | Creator(s) | Work | Ref. |
|---|---|---|---|
| 2017 | Ananth Hirsh and Yuko Ota | Our Cats Are More Famous Than Us: A Johnny Wander Collection | |
| 2018 | Sophia Foster-Dimino | Sex Fantasy | |
| 2019 | Casey Nowak | Girl Town | |
| 2020 | Eddie Carasco | GLEEM | |
| 2021 | Abby Howard | The Crossroads at Midnight | |
| 2022 | Alec Robbins | Mr Boop | |
| 2023 | Megan Kelso | Who Will Make The Pancakes? | |
| 2024 | Saito Nazuna | Offshore Lightning | |
| 2025 | Julia Gfrörer | World Within the World | |
| 2026 | Michael DeForge | All the Cameras in My Room | |

=== Outstanding Graphic Novel ===
Outstanding Graphic Novel award winners
| Year | Creator(s) | Work | Publisher | Ref. |
|---|---|---|---|---|
| 2005 | Marjane Satrapi | Persepolis 2: The Story of a Return | Pantheon | |
| 2006 | Alex Robinson | Tricked | Top Shelf Productions | |
| 2007 | Anders Nilsen | Don't Go Where I Can't Follow | Drawn & Quarterly | |
| 2008 | Mariko Tamaki and Jillian Tamaki | Skim | Groundwood Books | |
| 2009 | Chris Ware | Acme Novelty Library #19 | Drawn & Quarterly | |
| 2010 | James Sturm | Market Day | Drawn & Quarterly | |
| 2011 | Edie Fake | Gaylord Phoenix | Secret Acres | |
| 2012 | Anders Nilsen | Big Questions | Drawn & Quarterly | |
| 2013 | Ulli Lust | Today is the Last Day of the Rest of Your Life | Fantagraphics Books | |
| 2014 | Jillian Tamaki and Mariko Tamaki | This One Summer | | |
| 2015 | Sophie Goldstein | The Oven | | |
| 2016 | Lisa Hanawalt | Hot Dog Taste Test | | |
| 2017 | Emil Ferris | My Favorite Thing is Monsters | | |
| 2018 | Eleanor Davis | Why Art? | | |
| 2019 | Mariko Tamaki and Rosemary Valero-O'Connell | Laura Dean Keeps Breaking Up with Me | | |
| 2020 | Ebony Flowers | Hot Comb | | |
| 2021 | Lee Lai | Stone Fruit | | |
| 2022 | R. Kikuo Johnson | No One Else | Fantagraphics | |
| 2023 | Kate Beaton | Ducks: Two Years in the Oil Sands | Drawn & Quarterly | |
| 2024 | Jillian Tamaki and Mariko Tamaki | Roaming | Drawn & Quarterly | |
| 2025 | Kayla E. | Precious Rubbish | Fantagraphics | |
| 2026 | Lee Lai | Cannon | Giramondo Publishing | |

=== Outstanding Story ===
Outstanding Story award winners
| Year | Creator(s) | Work | Publisher | Ref. |
|---|---|---|---|---|
| 1997 | Alan Moore and Eddie Campbell | From Hell | Kitchen Sink Press | |
| 1998 | Daniel Clowes | "Ghost World", Eightball | Fantagraphics | |
| 1999 | Daniel Clowes | "David Boring", Eightball #20 | Fantagraphics | |
| 2000 | Chris Ware | "Jimmy Corrigan, the Smartest Kid on Earth", Acme Novelty Library | Fantagraphics | |
| 2001 | 2001 Ignatz Awards cancelled after 9-11 Attacks | | | |
| 2002 | Scott Mills | Trenches | Top Shelf Productions | |
| 2003 | Jason Shiga | Fleep | Sparkplug Comic Books | |
| 2004 | Kevin Huizenga | "Glenn Ganges", Drawn & Quarterly Showcase, Vol. 1 | Drawn & Quarterly | |
| 2005 | Anders Nilsen | Dogs and Water | Drawn & Quarterly | |
| 2006 | Kevin Huizenga | Ganges #1 | Fantagraphics Books | |
| 2007 | Gabrielle Bell | "Felix", Drawn & Quarterly Showcase, Vol. 4 | Drawn & Quarterly | |
| 2008 | Lilli Carré | The Thing About Madeleine | Self-published | |
| 2009 | Damien Jay | "Willy", Papercutter #10 | Tugboat | |
| 2010 | Ken Dahl | Monsters | Secret Acres | |
| 2011 | Jaime Hernández | "Browntown", Love and Rockets: New Stories #3 | Fantagraphics | |
| 2012 | Jaime Hernández | "Return to Me", Love and Rockets: New Stories #4 | Fantagraphics | |
| 2013 | John Martz | Gold Star | Retrofit Comics | |
| 2014 | Meredith Gran | "Brownout Biscuit", Octopus Pie | Dead Forever | |
| 2015 | Jillian Tamaki | "Sex Coven", Frontier #7 | | |
| 2016 | Noah Van Sciver | My Hot Date | | |
| 2017 | Carolyn Nowak | Diana's Electric Tongue | | |
| 2018 | Lee Knox Ostertag | How the Best Hunter in the Village Met Her Death | | |
| 2019 | Mariko Tamaki and Rosemary Valero-O'Connell | Laura Dean Keeps Breaking Up with Me | | |
| 2020 | Eleanor Davis | The Hard Tomorrow | | |
| 2021 | Freddy Carrasco | Personal Companion | | |
| 2022 | Beatrix Urkowitz | The Lover of Everyone in the World | Parsifal Press | |
| 2023 | Robyn Smith and Jamila Rowser | Wash Day Diaries | Chronicle Books | |
| 2024 | Sami Alwani | "The Happy Art", Pulping | Pulping Collective | |
| 2025 | Leo Fox | Boy Island | Silver Sprocket | |
| 2026 | Jesse Lonergan | Drome | 23rd Street | |

=== Promising New Talent ===
Promising New Talent award winners
| Year | Creator | Work | Publisher | Ref. |
|---|---|---|---|---|
| 1997 | Debbie Drechsler | Nowhere | Drawn & Quarterly | |
| 1998 | Carla Speed McNeil | Finder | Lightspeed Press | |
| 1999 | Brian Ralph | Fireball #7 | Fort Thunder | |
| 2000 | Nick Bertozzi | Boswash | Luxurious Comics | |
| 2001 | 2001 Ignatz Awards cancelled after 9-11 Attacks | | | |
| 2002 | Greg Cook | Catch as Catch Can | Highwater Books | |
| 2003 | Derek Kirk Kim | Same Difference and Other Stories | Self-published | |
| 2004 | Lauren Weinstein | Kramers Ergot #4 | Avodah Books | |
| 2005 | Andy Runton | Owly | Top Shelf Productions | |
| 2006 | Hope Larson | Salamander Dream; Gray Horses | AdHouse Books; Oni Press | |
| 2007 | Tom Neely | The Blot | I Will Destroy You | |
| 2008 | Sarah Glidden | How to Understand Israel in 60 Days or Less | Self-published | |
| 2009 | Colleen Frakes | Woman King | Self-published | |
| 2010 | Matt Wiegle | "The Orphan Baiter", Papercutter #13 | Tugboat Press | |
| 2011 | Darryl Ayo Brathwaite | House of Twelve Monthly #3 | Comixology | |
| 2012 | Lale Westvind | Hot Dog Beach | Self-published | |
| 2013 | Sam Alden | Hawaii 1997 & Haunter | Self-published | |
| 2014 | Cathy G. Johnson | Jeremiah; Boy Genius; Until It Runs Clear | | |
| 2015 | Sophia Foster-Dimino | Sphincter; Sex Fantasy | | |
| 2016 | Tillie Walden | I Love This Part | | |
| 2017 | Bianca Xunise | "Say Her Name", The Nib | | |
| 2018 | Yasmin Omar Ata | Mis(h)adra | | |
| 2019 | Ebony Flowers | My Lil Sister Lena | | |
| 2020 | Theo Stultz | Canvas | | |
| 2021 | Pa-Luis | We Live on Earth | | |
| 2022 | Juni Ba | Djeliya | TKO Studios | |
| 2023 | Deb JJ Lee | In Limbo | First Second | |
| 2024 | Léa Murawiec | The Great Beyond | Drawn & Quarterly | |
| 2025 | Vicky Yang | Unmoored | Self-published | |
| 2026 | Oscar Woodiwiss | A Scientific Study of Transsexuality | Fieldmouse Press | |

=== Outstanding Series ===
Outstanding Series award winners
| Year | Creator(s) | Work | Publisher | Ref. |
|---|---|---|---|---|
| 1997 | Chris Ware | Acme Novelty Library | Fantagraphics | |
| 1998 | Chris Ware | Acme Novelty Library | Fantagraphics | |
| 1999 | Max | The Extended Dream of Mr. D | Drawn & Quarterly | |
| 2000 | Dave Cooper | Weasel | Fantagraphics Books | |
| 2001 | 2001 Ignatz Awards cancelled after 9-11 Attacks | | | |
| 2002 | James Kochalka | Sketchbook Diaries | Top Shelf Productions | |
| 2003 | Charles Burns | Black Hole | Fantagraphics Books | |
| 2004 | Carla Speed McNeil | Finder | Light Speed Productions | |
| 2005 | Carla Speed McNeil | Finder | Light Speed Productions | |
| 2006 | Andy Runton | Owly | Top Shelf Productions | |
| 2007 | Kazimir Strzepek | Mourning Star | Bodega Distribution | |
| 2008 | Chuck Forsman | Snake Oil | Self-published | |
| 2009 | Jordan Crane | Uptight | Fantagraphics | |
| 2010 | Kevin Huizenga | Ganges | Fantagraphics Books | |
| 2011 | Box Brown | Everything Dies | | |
| 2012 | Hernández brothers | Love and Rockets: New Stories | Fantagraphics | |
| 2013 | Michael DeForge | Lose | Koyama Press | |
| 2014 | Jason Shiga | Demon | | |
| 2015 | Sophia Foster-Dimino | Sex Fantasy | | |
| 2016 | Keiler Roberts | Powdered Milk | | |
| 2017 | Jess Fink | Chester 5000 | | |
| 2018 | Youth in Decline | Frontier | | |
| 2019 | Matt Bors (ed.) | The Nib | | |
| 2020 | Whit Taylor | Fizzle | | |
| 2021 | Peow Studios | Ex.Mag | | |
| 2022 | Ram V and Filipe Andrade | The Many Deaths of Laila Starr | BOOM! Studios | |
| 2023 | Drew Lerman | Tales of Old Snake Creek | Self-published | |
| 2024 | Hannah Templer | CosmoKnights | Top Shelf Productions | |
| 2025 | Sanika Phawde | Wedding Juice and Other Melodramas | Self-published | |
| 2026 | Sanika Phawde | Wedding Juice and Other Melodramas | Self-published | |

=== Outstanding Comic ===
Outstanding Comic award winners
| Year | Creator | Work | Publication | Ref. |
|---|---|---|---|---|
| 1997 | Daniel Clowes | Eightball #17 | Fantagraphics | |
| 1998 | Chris Ware | Acme Novelty Library #9 | Fantagraphics | |
| 1999 | Frank Cho | Liberty Meadows #1 | Insight Studio Group | |
| 2000 | Chris Ware | Acme Novelty Library #13 | Fantagraphics Books | |
| 2001 | 2001 Ignatz Awards cancelled after 9-11 attacks | | | |
| 2002 | Daniel Clowes | Eightball #22 | Fantagraphics Books | |
| 2003 | Nick Bertozzi | Rubber Necker #2 | Alternative Comics | |
| 2004 | Daniel Clowes | Eightball #23 | Fantagraphics Books | |
| 2005 | Kevin Huizenga | Or Else #1 | Drawn & Quarterly | |
| 2006 | Ivan Brunetti | Schizo #4 | Fantagraphics Books | |
| 2007 | Adrian Tomine | Optic Nerve #11 | Drawn & Quarterly | |
| 2008 | Chuck Forsman | Snake Oil #1 | Self-published | |
| 2009 | Jordan Crane | Uptight #3 | Fantagraphics | |
| 2010 | Lisa Hanawalt | I Want You | Buenaventura Press | |
| 2011 | Michael DeForge | Lose #3 | Koyama Press | |
| 2012 | Brendan Leach | Pterodactyl Hunters | Top Shelf | |
| 2013 | Ethan Rilly | Pope Hats #3 | AdHouse Books | |
| 2014 | Sam Alden | Wicked Chicken Queen | Retrofit Comics/Big Planet Comics | |
| 2015 | Sophie Goldstein | The Oven | | |
| 2016 | Sam Bosma | Fantasy Sports #1 | | |
| 2017 | Ben Passmore | Your Black Friend | | |
| 2018 | Tara Booth | Hot to Be Alive | | |
| 2019 | Ngozi Ukazu | Check, Please! | | |
| 2020 | Ariel Ries | Cry Wolf Girl | | |
| 2021 | Ashanti Fortson | Leaf Lace | | |
| 2022 | Xulia Vicente | I See A Knight | Shortbox | |
| 2023 | Daisy Ruiz | Gordita: Built Like This | Black Josei Press | |
| 2024 | Leo Fox | My Body Unspooling | Silver Sprocket | |
| 2025 | Anders Nilsen | Tongues Supplement #1 | NoMiracles | |
| 2026 | Anand Shenoy | Zoo #5 | Self-published | |

=== Outstanding Minicomic ===
Outstanding Minicomic award winners
| Year | Creator(s) | Work | Publisher | Ref. |
|---|---|---|---|---|
| 1997 | James Kochalka | The Perfect Planet | | |
| 1998 | Rachel Hartman | Amy Unbounded | Pug House Press | |
| 1999 | Brian Ralph | Fireball #7 | Highwater Books | |
| 2000 | Kurt Wolfgang (ed.) | LowJinx #2 | Noe-Fie Mono-Media | |
| 2001 | | Ignatz Awards cancelled after 9-11 Attacks | | |
| 2002 | Megan Kelso | Artichoke Tales #1 | Highwater Books | |
| 2003 | Jeffrey Brown | I Am Going to Be Small | Self-published | |
| 2004 | Gabrielle Bell | Lucky #3 | Self-published | |
| 2005 | Alec Longstreth | Phase 7 | Self-published | |
| 2006 | Ken Dahl | Monsters | | |
| 2007 | Minty Lewis | P.S. Comics #3 | | |
| 2008 | Jesse Reklaw | Jesse Reklaw | | |
| 2009 | Lisa Hanawalt | Stay Away From Other People | | |
| 2010 | Jim Rugg | Rambo 3.5 | | |
| 2011 | Box Brown | Ben Died of a Train | | |
| 2012 | Corinne Mucha | The Monkey in the Basement and Other Delusions | Retrofit Comics | |
| 2013 | Charles Forsman | The End of the Fucking World, #16 | Fantagraphics | |
| 2014 | Sophie Goldstein | House of Women | | |
| 2015 | Sophia Foster-Dimino | Sex Fantasy #4 | | |
| 2016 | Carolyn Nowak | Radishes | | |
| 2017 | Hazel Newlevant | Tender-Hearted | | |
| 2018 | Shing Yin Khor | Say It With Noodles: On Learning to Speak the Language of Food | | |
| 2019 | Emma Jayne | Trans Girls Hit the Town | | |
| 2020 | Cathy G. Johnson | Black Hole Heart | | |
| 2021 | Casey Nowak | Bodyseed | | |
| 2022 | Caroline Cash | PeePee PooPoo #69 | Self-published | |
| 2023 | Yasmeen Abedifard | Death Bloom | Self-published | |
| 2024 | Yuan Song | Manga Cube | Self-published | |
| 2025 | Violet Kitchen | Allodynia | Self-published | |
| 2026 | Yoko O.K. | Uncoiling: A Japanese-American Family History | Self-published | |

=== Outstanding Online Comic ===
Outstanding Online Comic award winners
| Year | Creator(s) | Work | Ref. |
|---|---|---|---|
| 2001 | Ignatz Awards cancelled after 9-11 Attacks | | |
| 2002 | Jason Little | Bee | |
| 2003 | James Kochalka | American Elf | |
| 2004 | James Kochalka | American Elf | |
| 2005 | Nicholas Gurewitch | The Perry Bible Fellowship | |
| 2006 | Nicholas Gurewitch | The Perry Bible Fellowship | |
| 2007 | Chris Onstad | Achewood | |
| 2008 | Chris Onstad | Achewood | |
| 2009 | Cayetano Garza | Year of the Rat | |
| 2010 | Mike Dawson | Troop 142 | |
| 2011 | Kate Beaton | Hark! A Vagrant | |
| 2012 | Jillian Tamaki | SuperMutant Magic Academy | |
| 2013 | Jillian Tamaki | SuperMutant Magic Academy | |
| 2014 | Evan Dahm | Vattu | |
| 2015 | Lilli Carré | The Bloody Footprint | |
| 2016 | Meredith Gran | Octopus Pie | |
| 2017 | Der-shing Helmer | The Meek | |
| 2018 | Carta Monir | Lara Croft Was My Family | |
| 2019 | Hannah Blumenreich | Full Court Crush | |
| 2020 | Ariel Ries | Witchy | |
| 2021 | Michael DeForge | Birds of Maine | |
| 2022 | Mars Heyward | Ride or Die | |
| 2023 | Reimena Yee | The God of Arepo | |
| 2024 | Shazleen Khan | Buuza!! | |
| 2025 | Otava Heikkilä | Home by the Rotting Sea | |
| 2026 | Adam de Souza | Blind Alley | |

=== Outstanding Anthology or Collection (discontinued) ===
Outstanding Anthology or Collection award winners
| Year | Creator(s) | Title | Publisher | Ref. |
|---|---|---|---|---|
| 2005 | John Porcellino | Diary of a Mosquito Abatement Man | La Mano | |
| 2006 | Charles Burns | Black Hole | Pantheon | |
| 2007 | Kevin Huizenga | Curses | Drawn & Quarterly | |
| 2008 | Greg Means (ed.) | Papercutter #7 | Tugboat Press | |
| 2009 | Sammy Harkham (ed.) | Kramers Ergot #7 | Buenaventura | |
| 2010 | R. Sikoryak | Masterpiece Comics | Drawn & Quarterly | |
| 2011 | Joseph Lambert | I Will Bite You | Secret Acres | |
| 2012 | Kate Beaton | Hark! A Vagrant | Drawn & Quarterly | |
| 2013 | Michael DeForge | Very Casual | Koyama Press | |
| 2014 | Robert Kirby (ed.) | QU33R | | |
| 2015 | Eleanor Davis | How To Be Happy | | |
| 2016 | Kate Beaton | Step Aside Pops | | |

=== Outstanding Graphic Novel or Collection (discontinued) ===
Outstanding Graphic Novel or Collection award winners
| Year | Creator(s) | Work | Publisher | Ref. |
|---|---|---|---|---|
| 1997 | Seth | It's a Good Life, If You Don't Weaken | Drawn & Quarterly | |
| 1998 | Daniel Clowes | Ghost World | Fantagraphics | |
| 1999 | Dave McKean | Cages | Kitchen Sink | |
| 2000 | Alan Moore and Eddie Campbell | From Hell | Eddie Campbell Comics, distributed by Top Shelf Productions | |
| 2001 | Ignatz Awards cancelled after 9-11 Attacks | | | |
| 2002 | James Sturm | The Golem's Mighty Swing | Drawn & Quarterly | |
| 2003 | Rich Koslowski | Three Fingers | Top Shelf Productions | |
| 2004 | Craig Thompson | Blankets | Top Shelf Productions | |

=== Outstanding Debut Comic (discontinued) ===
Award winners and finalists
| Year | Creator(s) | Work | Publisher | Ref. |
|---|---|---|---|---|
| 2000 | Evan Dorkin | Dork #8 | Slave Labor Graphics | |
| 2001 | Ignatz Awards cancelled after 9-11 Attacks | | | |
| 2002 | Joel Priddy | Pulpatoon Pilgrimage | AdHouse Books | |
| 2003 | Zack Soto (ed.) | Studygroup12 #3 | | |
| 2004 | Dave Roman and John Green | Teen Boat #6: Vote Boat | Cryptic Press | |
| 2005 | Liz Prince | Will You Still Love Me if I Wet the Bed? | Top Shelf Productions | |
| 2006 | Josh Eiserike | Class of '99 | Self-Published | |
| 2007 | Alec Longstreth (ed.) | Papercutter #6 | Tugboat Press | |
| 2008 | Nate Powell | Swallow Me Whole | Top Shelf Productions | |

=== Ignatz Awards Jury ===
- 1997
  - Jessica Abel
  - Chester Brown
  - Ed Brubaker
  - Mark Wheatley
  - Joe Zabel
- 1998
  - Michael Cohen
  - Tom Devlin
  - Tom Hart
  - Marc Hempel
  - Dylan Horrocks
- 1999
  - Frank Cho
  - Jordan Crane
  - Jon Lewis
  - Carla Speed McNeil
  - Jim Ottaviani
- 2000
  - Donna Barr
  - Sean Bieri
  - Phil Foglio
  - Dean Haspiel
  - Jason Little
- 2001
  - Matt Feazell
  - Roberta Gregory
  - Jon "Bean" Hastings
  - Sam Henderson
  - James Sturm
- 2002
  - Suzanne Baumann
  - Nick Bertozzi
  - David Lasky
  - Alex Robinson
- 2003
  - Pam Bliss
  - Ariel Bordeaux
  - David Hahn
  - Batton Lash
  - Matt Madden
- 2004
  - Kevin Huizenga
  - Megan Kelso
  - Rich Koslowski
  - Layla Lawlor
  - Steve Lieber
- 2005
  - Jennifer Daydreamer
  - Shaenon Garrity
  - James Kochalka
  - Jeff Parker
  - Dan Zettwoch
- 2006
  - Jeffrey Brown
  - Henry Chamberlain
  - Justin Hall
  - Laurenn McCubbin
  - Jim Rugg
- 2007
  - Sara Edward-Corbett
  - Paul Hornschemeier
  - Steve MacIsaac
  - Jesse Reklaw
  - Zack Soto
- 2008
  - Gabrielle Bell
  - Farel Dalrymple
  - Eleanor Davis
  - John Hankiewicz
  - Andy Hartzell
- 2009
  - Lilli Carré
  - Vanessa Davis
  - Robert Kirby
  - Scott Mills
  - Laura Park
- 2010
  - Trevor Alixopulos
  - Joshua Cotter
  - Rob G
  - David Kelly
  - Anders Nilsen
- 2011
  - Rina Ayuyang
  - Mike Dawson
  - Kris Dresen
  - Theo Ellsworth
  - John Porcellino
- 2012
  - Edie Fake
  - Minty Lewis
  - Dylan Meconis
  - Lark Pien
  - Julia Wertz
- 2013
  - Lisa Hanawalt
  - Dustin Harbin
  - Damien Jay
  - Sakura Maku
  - Jason Shiga
- 2014
  - Darryl Ayo
  - Austin English
  - Melissa Mendes
  - Thein Pham
  - Whit Taylor
- 2015
  - Lamar Abrams
  - Cara Bean
  - Robyn Chapman
  - Sophie Goldstein
  - Corrine Mucha
- 2016
  - Tony Breed
  - Summer Pierre
  - Keiler Roberts
  - C. Spike Trotman
  - J.T. Yost
- 2017
  - Neil Brideau
  - Glynnis Fawkes
  - Sara Lautman
  - Trungles
  - David Willis
- 2022
  - Cuyler Hedlund
  - Josh O'Neill
  - Breena Nunez
  - Alex Hoffman
  - Hazel Newlevant
- 2024
  - Caroline Cash
  - Martha Kuhlman
  - Dawn Bond
  - Lawrence Lindell
  - Kriota Wilberg
  - Emma Jensen
- 2026
  - Maria Hoey
  - Joel Christian Gill
  - Nick Bertozzi
  - Maggie McCready
  - Vik Alexander
  - Meg Lentz
  - Michael Albrecht
  - Sofia Lesage

== Ignatz Awards Committee ==
- 1997
  - Chris Oarr, Coordinator
- 1998
  - Chris Oarr, Coordinator
  - Jeff Alexander
- 1999
  - Jeff Alexander, Coordinator
- 2000–2006
  - Jeff Alexander, Coordinator
  - Karon Flage
  - Greg McElhatton
- 2007–2010
  - Greg McElhatton, Coordinator
  - Jeff Alexander
  - Karon Flage
- 2011–2012
  - Eden Miller, Coordinator
  - Greg McElhatton
  - Karon Flage
- 2013–2016
  - Eden Miller, Coordinator
- 2017–present
  - Dan Stafford, Coordinator
