= Ignatz Award for Outstanding Graphic Novel or Collection =

US comics and cartooning award

- Awarded for: Outstanding achievements in comics and cartooning by small press creators or creator-owned projects published by larger publishers
- Location: Bethesda, Maryland
- Country: United States
- Presented by: Ignatz Award Committee
- Hosted by: Small Press Expo
- First award: 1997
- Final award: 2004
- Website: www.smallpressexpo.com/ignatz-awards

The Ignatz Award for Outstanding Graphic Novel or Collection (1997–2004) was an annual literary award recognizing outstanding achievements in comics and cartooning by small press creators or creator-owned projects published by larger publishers. After 2004, the award was separated into two awards: the Ignatz Award for Outstanding Graphic Novel and Ignatz Award for Outstanding Anthology or Collection; the latter was split into the Ignatz Award for Outstanding Anthology and Ignatz Award for Outstanding Collection in 2017.

== Recipients ==
Award winners and finalists
Year	Creator(s)	Work	Publisher	Result	Ref.
1997	Seth	It's a Good Life, If You Don't Weaken	Drawn & Quarterly	Winner	
1997	Ed Brubaker	At The Seams	Alternative Press	Finalist	
1997	Ben Katchor	Julius Knipl, Real Estate Photographer: Stories	Little, Brown	Finalist	
1997	David B.	L'ascension du haut-mal	L'Association	Finalist	
1997	Cosey	Lost in the Alps	NBM	Finalist	
1998	Daniel Clowes	Ghost World	Fantagraphics	Winner	
1998	Jim Woodring	Frank vol. 2	Fantagraphics	Finalist	
1998	Chester Brown	The Little Man	Drawn & Quarterly	Finalist	
1998	Mark Wheatley (ed.)	Titanic Tales	Insight Studios	Finalist	
1998	Martin Tom Dieck	Views of the Warehouse District	Westhampton House	Finalist	
1999	Dave McKean	Cages	Kitchen Sink	Winner	
1999	Pete Sickman-Garner	Hey Mister: Celebrity Roast	Top Shelf Productions	Finalist	
1999	Dylan Horrocks	Hicksville	Black Eye	Finalist	
1999	Ed Hillyer	Time Warp	Slab-O-Concrete	Finalist	
1999	James Kochalka	Tiny Bubbles	Highwater Books	Finalist	
2000	Alan Moore and Eddie Campbell	From Hell	Eddie Campbell Comics, distributed by Top Shelf Productions	Winner	
2000	Tom Hart	Banks/Eubanks	Top Shelf Productions	Finalist	
2000	Jay Hosler	Clan Apis	Active Synapse	Finalist	
2000	Various	Comix 2000	L'Association	Finalist	
2000	Various	Drawn & Quarterly, Volume 3	Drawn & Quarterly	Finalist	
2001	Ignatz Awards cancelled after 9-11 Attacks				
2001	Alex Robinson	Box Office Poison	Top Shelf Productions	Finalist	
2001	Chris Ware	Jimmy Corrigan, the Smartest Kid on Earth	Pantheon Books	Finalist	
2001	Mark Kalesniko	Mail Order Bride	Fantagraphics Books	Finalist	
2001	Joe Sacco	Safe Area Gorazde: The War in Eastern Bosnia 1992-95	Fantagraphics Books	Finalist	
2001	Michael Kupperman	Snake 'n' Bacon's Cartoon Cabaret	Avon Books	Finalist	
2002	James Sturm	The Golem's Mighty Swing	Drawn & Quarterly	Winner	
2002	Jim Ottaviani (ed.)	Fallout	G.T. Labs	Finalist	
2002	Ivan Brunetti	Haw!	Fantagraphics Books	Finalist	
2002	Jordan Crane (ed.)	Non #5	Red Ink Press	Finalist	
2002	Debbie Drechsler	Summer of Love	Drawn & Quarterly	Finalist	
2003	Rich Koslowski	Three Fingers	Top Shelf Productions	Winner	
2003	Bob Fingerman	Beg The Question	Fantagraphics Books	Finalist	
2003	David B.	Epileptic	L'Association	Finalist	
2003	Spain Rodriguez and William Lindsay Gresham	Nightmare Alley	Fantagraphics Books	Finalist	
2003	Jim Woodring	The Frank Book	Fantagraphics Books	Finalist	
2004	Craig Thompson	Blankets	Top Shelf Productions	Winner	
2004	Chester Brown	Louis Riel	Drawn & Quarterly	Finalist	
2004	Chris Ware (ed.)	McSweeney's Quarterly Concern #13	McSweeney's, Ltd.	Finalist	
2004	Mat Brinkman	Teratoid Heights	Highwater Books	Finalist	
2004	Joe Sacco	The Fixer	Drawn & Quarterly	Finalist	

== Writers with multiple nominations ==
The following writers have received two or more nominations:

Two

- David B.
- Chester Brown
- Joe Sacco
- Chris Ware
- Jim Woodring
