= Ignatz Award for Outstanding Collection =

US comics and cartooning award

- Awarded for: Outstanding achievements in comics and cartooning by small press creators or creator-owned projects published by larger publishers
- Location: Bethesda, Maryland
- Country: United States
- Presented by: Ignatz Award Committee
- Hosted by: Small Press Expo
- First award: 2017
- Website: www.smallpressexpo.com/ignatz-awards

The Ignatz Award for Outstanding Collection, established in 2017 as part of the Ignatz Awards, is an annual literary award recognizing outstanding achievements in comics and cartooning by small press creators or creator-owned projects published by larger publishers. The award for outstanding collection "recognizes a book of selected short comics from various prior publications by the same cartoonist", which would not be eligible for the Ignatz Award for Outstanding Graphic Novel.

== Recipients ==
Award winners and finalists
Year	Creator(s)	Work	Result	Ref.
2017	Ananth Hirsh and Yuko Ota	Our Cats Are More Famous Than Us: A Johnny Wander Collection	Winner	
2017	Jillian Tamaki	Boundless	Finalist	
2017	Ed Piskor	Hip Hop Family Tree, Vol. 4	Finalist	
2017	Peter Bagge	The Complete Neat Stuff	Finalist	
2017	Leslie Stein	Time Clock	Finalist	
2018	Sophia Foster-Dimino	Sex Fantasy	Winner	
2018	Mazen Kerbaj	Beirut Won't Cry	Finalist	
2018	Manuele Fior	Blackbird Days	Finalist	
2018	Hannah K. Lee	Language Barrier	Finalist	
2018	Julia Kaye	Super Late Bloomer: My Early Days in Transition	Finalist	
2019	Casey Nowak	Girl Town	Winner	
2019	Julie Doucet	Dirty Plotte	Finalist	
2019	Michael DeForge	Leaving Richard's Valley	Finalist	
2019	Paige Braddock	Love Letters to Jane's World	Finalist	
2019	Julie Delporte	This Woman's Work	Finalist	
2020	Eddie Carasco	GLEEM	Winner	
2020	Kevin Huizenga	Glenn Ganges in: The River at Night	Finalist	
2020	Gabrielle Bell	Inappropriate	Finalist	
2020	Tianran Qu	Slices of Life: 100 Comic Montage	Finalist	
2020	Noah Van Sciver	The Complete Works of Fante Bukowski	Finalist	
2021	Abby Howard	The Crossroads at Midnight	Winner	
2021	Tess Scilipoti	Do You Think I Look Like a Girl?	Finalist	
2021	Ancco	Nineteen	Finalist	
2021	Sami Alwani	The Pleasure of the Text	Finalist	
2021	Kuniko Tsurita	The Sky is Blue with a Single Cloud	Finalist	
2022	Alec Robbins	Mr Boop	Winner	
2022	Trinidad Escobar	Arrive In My Hands	Finalist	
2022	Max Huffman	Cover Not Final: Crime Funnies	Finalist	
2022	Rumi Hara	The Peanutbutter Sisters and Other American Stories	Finalist	
2022	Wang XX	Think I've Still Got It!	Finalist	
2023	Megan Kelso	Who Will Make The Pancakes?	Winner	
2023	Ashley Topacio	Boodle Fight	Finalist	
2023	Matthew Allison	Cankor	Finalist	
2023	Simon Roy, Jess Pollard, and Sergey Nazarov	Griz Grobus and the Tale of Azkon's Heart	Finalist	
2023	Jason	Upside Dawn	Finalist	
2024	Saito Nazuna	Offshore Lightning	Winner	
2024	Guido Buzzelli	Buzzelli Collected Works Vol 1: The Labyrinth	Finalist	
2024	November Garcia	Complete and Utter Malarkey	Finalist	
2024	Ajuan Mance	Gender Studies: The Confessions of an Accidental Outlaw	Finalist	
2024	Gigi Murakami	Resenter	Finalist	
2025	Julia Gfrörer	World Within the World	Winner	
2025	Rachel Ang	I Ate the Whole World to Find You	Finalist	
2025	Michael D. Kennedy	Milk White Steed	Finalist	
2025	Keiler Roberts	Preparing to Bite	Finalist	
2025	Max Huffman	Them-Shaped Cloud	Finalist	
2026	Michael DeForge	All the Cameras in My Room	Winner	
2026	Valentine Gallardo	A Strong Woman and Other Stories	Finalist	
2026	Akino Kondoh	Box Garden Beetle	Finalist	
2026	Tommi Parrish	The Past is a Grotesque Animal	Finalist	
2026	Amanda Baeza	Wisps	Finalist	

== Writers with multiple nominations ==
The following writers have received two or more nominations:

Two

- Michael DeForge
- Max Huffman
