= Ignatz Award for Outstanding Graphic Novel =

US comics and cartooning award

Ignatz Award
- Awarded for: Outstanding achievements in comics and cartooning by small press creators or creator-owned projects published by larger publishers
- Location: Bethesda, Maryland
- Country: United States
- Presented by: Ignatz Award Committee
- Hosted by: Small Press Expo
- First award: 2005

Highlights
- Most wins: Mariko Tamaki
- Website: www.smallpressexpo.com/ignatz-awards

The Ignatz Award for Outstanding Graphic Novel, established in 2005 as part of the Ignatz Awards, is an annual literary award that recognizes outstanding achievements in comics and cartooning by small press creators or creator-owned projects published by larger publishers. The award for outstanding graphic novel is presented "for previously unpublished material" of greater than 48 pages that is "intended to be read as a single work".

== Recipients ==
Award winners and finalists
Year	Creator(s)	Work	Publisher	Result	Ref.
2005	Marjane Satrapi	Persepolis 2: The Story of a Return	Pantheon	Winner	
2005	Jeffrey Brown	Bighead	Top Shelf Productions	Finalist	
2005	Craig Thompson	Carnet de Voyage	Top Shelf Productions	Finalist	
2005	Thomas Ott	Cinema Panopticum	L'Association, Fantagraphics	Finalist	
2005	Jason	Why Are You Doing This?	Fantagraphics Books	Finalist	
2006	Alex Robinson	Tricked	Top Shelf Productions	Winner	
2006	Alison Bechdel	Fun Home	Houghton Mifflin	Finalist	
2006	Jordan Crane	The Clouds Above	Fantagraphics Books	Finalist	
2006	Renée French	The Ticking	Top Shelf Productions	Finalist	
2006	Seth	Wimbledon Green	Drawn & Quarterly	Finalist	
2007	Anders Nilsen	Don't Go Where I Can't Follow	Drawn & Quarterly	Winner	
2007	Marguerite Abouet and Clément Oubrerie	Aya	Drawn & Quarterly	Finalist	
2007	Jason Shiga	Bookhunter	Sparkplug Comic Books	Finalist	
2007	Rutu Modan	Exit Wounds	Drawn & Quarterly	Finalist	
2007	Josh Simmons	House	Fantagraphics Books	Finalist	
2008	Mariko Tamaki and Jillian Tamaki	Skim	Groundwood Books	Winner	
2008	Gipi	Notes for a War Story	First Second Books	Finalist	
2008	Michel Rabagliati	Paul Goes Fishing	Drawn & Quarterly	Finalist	
2008	Joe Matt	Spent	Drawn & Quarterly	Finalist	
2008	Trevor Alixopulos	The Hot Breath of War	Sparkplug Comic Books	Finalist	
2009	Chris Ware	Acme Novelty Library #19	Drawn & Quarterly	Winner	
2009	Hideo Azuma	Disappearance Diary	Fanfare/Ponent Mon	Finalist	
2009	Dave Lapp	Drop-In	Conundrum	Finalist	
2009	Pascal Girard	Nicolas	Drawn & Quarterly	Finalist	
2009	Carol Tyler	You'll Never Know, Book One: A Good and Decent Man	Fantagraphics	Finalist	
2010	James Sturm	Market Day	Drawn & Quarterly	Winner	
2010	Al Columbia	Pim & Francie: The Golden Bear Days	Fantagraphics Books	Finalist	
2010	Yumemakura Baku and Jiro Taniguchi	Summit of the Gods Vol. 1	Fanfare/Ponent Mon	Finalist	
2010	Jerry Moriarty	The Complete Jack Survives	Buentaventura Press	Finalist	
2010	Willy Linthout	Years of the Elephant	Fanfare/Ponent Mon	Finalist	
2011	Edie Fake	Gaylord Phoenix	Secret Acres	Winner	
2011	Barry Deutsch	Hereville: How Mirka Got Her Sword	Amulet Books	Finalist	
2011	Joyce Farmer	Special Exits	Fantagraphics Books	Finalist	
2011	Chris Cilla	The Heavy Hand	Sparkplug	Finalist	
2011	Carol Tyler	You'll Never Know, Vol 2: Collateral Damage	Fantagraphics	Finalist	
2012	Anders Nilsen	Big Questions	Drawn & Quarterly	Winner	
2012	Jiro Taniguchi	A Zoo in Winter	Fanfare/Ponent Mon	Finalist	
2012	Harvey Pekar and Joseph Remnant	Harvey Pekar's Cleveland	Top Shelf/Zip	Finalist	
2012	Derf Backderf	My Friend Dahmer	Abrams ComicArts	Finalist	
2012	Mike Dawson	Troop 142	Secret Acres	Finalist	
2013	Ulli Lust	Today is the Last Day of the Rest of Your Life	Fantagraphics Books	Winner	
2013	Geneviève Castrée	Susceptible	Drawn & Quarterly	Finalist	
2013	Rutu Modan	The Property	Drawn & Quarterly	Finalist	
2013	Judith Vanistendael	When David Lost His Voice	Harry N. Abrams	Finalist	
2013	Carol Tyler	You'll Never Know Vol. 3: A Soldier's Heart	Fantagraphics Books	Finalist	
2014	Jillian Tamaki and Mariko Tamaki	This One Summer		Winner	
2014	Gene Luen Yang	Boxers and Saints		Finalist	
2014	Kim Deitch	The Amazing, Enlightening and Absolutely True Adventures of Katherine Whaley		Finalist	
2014	Reinhard Kleist	The Boxer		Finalist	
2014	Sophie Yanow	War of Streets and Houses		Finalist	
2015	Sophie Goldstein	The Oven		Winner	
2015	Kerascoët and Hubert	Beauty		Finalist	
2015	Mickey Zacchilli	Rav		Finalist	
2015	Noah Van Sciver	Saint Cole		Finalist	
2015	Walter Scott	Wendy		Finalist	
2016	Lisa Hanawalt	Hot Dog Taste Test		Winner	
2016	Josh Cotter	Nod Away		Finalist	
2016	Gabby Schulz	Sick		Finalist	
2016	Carol Tyler	Soldier's Heart		Finalist	
2016	Derf Backderf	Trashed		Finalist	
2017	Emil Ferris	My Favorite Thing is Monsters		Winner	
2017	Anya Davidson	Band for Life		Finalist	
2017	Cathy Malkasian	Eartha		Finalist	
2017	John Lewis, Nate Powell, and Andrew Aydin	March: Book 3		Finalist	
2017	Box Brown	Tetris		Finalist	
2018	Eleanor Davis	Why Art?		Winner	
2018	Connor Willumsen	Anti-Gone		Finalist	
2018	Marcelo D'Salete	Run for It: Stories of Slaves Who Fought for Their Freedom		Finalist	
2018	Tommi Parrish	The Lie and How We Told It		Finalist	
2018	Yeon-sik Hong	Uncomfortably Happily		Finalist	
2019	Mariko Tamaki and Rosemary Valero-O'Connell	Laura Dean Keeps Breaking Up with Me		Winner	
2019	Maia Kobabe	Gender Queer		Finalist	
2019	Koren Shadmi	Highwayman		Finalist	
2019	Ezra Claytan Daniels	Upgrade Soul		Finalist	
2019	Aminder Dhaliwal	Woman World		Finalist	
2020	Ebony Flowers	Hot Comb		Winner	
2020	Ulli Lust	How I Tried to be a Good Person		Finalist	
2020	Frank Santoro	Pittsburgh		Finalist	
2020	Molly Mendoza	Skip		Finalist	
2020	Ryan Andrews	This Was Our Pact		Finalist	
2021	Lee Lai	Stone Fruit		Winner	
2021	Sloane Leong	A Map to the Sun		Finalist	
2021	Jim Terry	Come Home, Indio		Finalist	
2021	Alex Graham	Dog Biscuits		Finalist	
2021	Nico Harriman	Mr. H: Portrait of a High School Art Teacher		Finalist	
2022	R. Kikuo Johnson	No One Else	Fantagraphics	Winner	
2022	Ariel Bordeaux	Clutter: A Scatterbrained Sexual Assault Memoir	Fieldmouse Press	Finalist	
2022	Dash Shaw	Discipline	New York Review Comics	Finalist	
2022	Mohammad Sabaaneh, translated by Dalia and Mouin Rabbani	Power Born of Dreams: My Story is Palestine	Street Noise Books	Finalist	
2022	Sabba Khan	What is Home, Mum?	Street Noise Books	Finalist	
2023	Kate Beaton	Ducks: Two Years in the Oil Sands	Drawn & Quarterly	Winner	
2023	Shang Zhang	Last Chance to Find Duke	PEOW	Finalist	
2023	Archie Bongiovanni	Mimosa	Abrams ComicArts	Finalist	
2023	Hayley Gold	Nervosa	Street Noise Books	Finalist	
2023	Rina Ayuyang	The Man in the McIntosh Suit	Drawn & Quarterly	Finalist	
2024	Jillian Tamaki and Mariko Tamaki	Roaming	Drawn & Quarterly	Winner	
2024	Xiang Yata	Optometry	Driftwood Press	Finalist	
2024	Darrin Bell	The Talk	Macmillan Publishers	Finalist	
2024	M.S. Harkness	Time Under Tensions	Fantagraphics	Finalist	
2024	Josh Bayer	Unended	Uncivilized Books	Finalist	
2025	Kayla E.	Precious Rubbish	Fantagraphics	Winner	
2025	Tim Bird	Adrift on a Painted Sea	Avery Hill Publishing	Finalist	
2025	María Medem, translated by Aleshia Jensen and Daniela Ortiz	Land of Mirrors	Drawn and Quarterly	Finalist	
2025	Tara Booth	Processing: 100 Comics That Got Me Through It	Drawn and Quarterly	Finalist	
2025	Mieke Versyp and Sabien Clement	Skin	Fantagraphics	Finalist	
2026	Lee Lai	Cannon	Giramondo Publishing	Winner	
2026	Ben Passmore	Black Arms to Hold You Up	Pantheon Books	Finalist	
2026	Mimi Pond	Do Admit! The Mitford Sisters and Me	Drawn & Quarterly	Finalist	
2026	Ben Wickey	More Weight: A Salem Story	Top Shelf Productions	Finalist	
2026	Melissa Mendes	The Weight	Drawn & Quarterly	Finalist	

== Writers with multiple wins ==
The following writers have received two or more wins:

Four

- Mariko Tamaki (Note: Jillian Tamaki and Mariko Tamaki have jointly won the award three times.)

Three

- Jillian Tamaki

Two

- Anders Nilsen

== Writers with multiple nominations ==
The following writers have received two or more nominations:

Four

- Mariko Tamaki
- Carol Tyler

Three

- Jillian Tamaki

Two

- Derf Backderf
- Lee Lai
- Ulli Lust
- Rutu Modan
- Anders Nilsen
