= Ignatz Award for Outstanding Debut Comic =

US comics and cartooning award

- Awarded for: Outstanding achievements in comics and cartooning by small press creators or creator-owned projects published by larger publishers
- Location: Bethesda, Maryland
- Country: United States
- Presented by: Ignatz Award Committee
- Hosted by: Small Press Expo
- First award: 2000
- Final award: 2008
- Website: www.smallpressexpo.com/ignatz-awards

The Ignatz Award for Outstanding Debut Comic (2000–2008) was an annual literary award recognizing outstanding achievements in comics and cartooning by small press creators or creator-owned projects published by larger publishers.

== Recipients ==
Award winners
Year	Creator(s)	Work	Publisher	Result	Ref.
2000	Evan Dorkin	Dork #8	Slave Labor Graphics	Winner	
2001	Ignatz Awards cancelled after 9-11 Attacks				
2002	Joel Priddy	Pulpatoon Pilgrimage	AdHouse Books	Winner	
2003	Zack Soto (ed.)	Studygroup12 #3		Winner	
2004	Dave Roman and John Green	Teen Boat #6: Vote Boat	Cryptic Press	Winner	
2005	Liz Prince	Will You Still Love Me if I Wet the Bed?	Top Shelf Productions	Winner	
2006	Josh Eiserike	Class of '99	Self-Published	Winner	
2007	Alec Longstreth (ed.)	Papercutter #6	Tugboat Press	Winner	
2008	Nate Powell	Swallow Me Whole	Top Shelf Productions	Winner	
