= Roaming (graphic novel) =

2023 graphic novel by Mariko and Jillian Tamaki

- Date: September 12, 2023
- Publisher: Drawn & Quarterly

Creative team
- Writer: Mariko Tamaki
- Artist: Jillian Tamaki
- ISBN: 978-1770464339

Roaming is a 2023 graphic novel written by Mariko Tamaki and illustrated by Jillian Tamaki, and published by Drawn & Quarterly on September 12, 2023. The novel follows three Canadian college students visiting New York City for a spring break trip in 2009.

== Plot ==
In the spring of 2009, childhood best friends Dani and Zoe travel from their respective universities in Canada to New York City. Unbeknownst to Zoe, Dani brings along her roommate Fiona, an art student, and the three stay in a hostel, visiting landmarks including the Metropolitan Museum of Art, Grand Central Station, and the American Museum of Natural History. A romance begins to blossom between Zoe and Fiona, and tensions rise as the five-day trip continues.

== Reception ==
Kirkus Reviews dubbed the book a "visually and narratively appealing work of coming-of-age fiction." Publisher Weekly and Library Journal gave Roaming starred reviews. It tied for the top graphic novel of Publishers Weekly's 2023 annual critics poll.

=== Accolades ===
Year	Award/Honor	Result	Ref.
2024	Doug Wright Award for Best Book	Shortlisted	
2024	Eisner Award for Best Graphic Album - New	Won	
2024	Eisner Award for Best Writer (Mariko Tamaki)	Won	
2024	Eisner Award for Best Penciler/Inker (Jillian Tamaki)	Won	
2024	Harvey Award for Book of the Year	Won	
2024	Harvey Award for Best Young Adult Book	Won	
2024	GLAAD Media Award for Outstanding Graphic Novel/Anthology	Shortlisted	
2024	Ignatz Award for Outstanding Graphic Novel	Won	
2024	Lambda Literary Award for LGBTQ+ Comics	Shortlisted	
2024	Libby Book Award for Comic/Graphic Novel	Shortlisted	
2025	Sophie Castille Award for Polish Translation (for Polish language translation Połączenia by Aga Zano)	Shortlisted	
