= Corinne Mucha =

Chicago based cartoonist, illustrator, and teaching artist

Corinne Mucha is a Chicago based cartoonist, illustrator, and teaching artist. Her comics work includes the Xeric funded "My Alaskan Summer," the Ignatz award-winning "The Monkey in the Basement and Other Delusions," and the young adult graphic novel "Freshman: Tales of 9th Grade Obsessions, Revelations and Other Nonsense".

== Early life and education ==
Corinne Mucha was born in 1983 and grew up in southern New Jersey. She graduated with a degree in illustration from Rhode Island School of Design in 2005.

== Works ==
- "My Alaskan Summer," 2008, 96 pages, self-published through a Xeric grant
- "My Every Single Thought," 2009, self-published
- "Freshman: Tales of 9th Grade Obsessions, Revelations, and Other Nonsense," 2011, 112 pages, published by Zest Books/ Houghton Mifflin
- "The Monkey in the Basement and Other Delusions," 2012, published by Retrofit Comics
- "Get Over It!" 2014, 106 pages, published by Secret Acres, ISBN 978-0988814967
- "The Girl Who Was Mostly Attracted to Ghosts," published by Secret Acres
- "It Doesn't Exist," published by Secret Acres
- "Get Over It!" published by Secret Acres
- "Fixated," published by Secret Acres

== Recognition ==
=== Grants and awards ===
- Ignatz award, "The Monkey in the Basement and Other Delusions," 2012
- Xeric Foundation grant, "My Alaskan Summer," 2008

=== Reviews ===
- "Panel Mania: Corinne Mucha and the Post Break-Up Blues," Publishers Weekly, April 16, 2014
- "9 Signs You're Over Your Ex: Corinne Mucha's "Get Over It!" is a balm for the heartbroken," BuzzFeed, May 19, 2014
- "Sink or Swim: Corinne Mucha Strives to “Get Over It,” LA Review of Books, December 27, 2014
