= Colleen Frakes =

American cartoonist

Colleen Frakes (born in 1980 in Washington) is an American comics writer and artist.

Originally from Walla Walla, Washington, Frakes is an alumna of The Evergreen State College and the Center for Cartoon Studies.

== Career ==
In 2008, Frakes wrote a short story for the Tales of the TMNT #53, published by Mirage Studios.

In 2015, Frakes released a graphic novel called Prison Island: a graphic memoir, published by Zest. The comic tells the story of Frakes growing up on McNeil Island, Washington, a remote island near McNeil Island Correctional Center.

In 2024, Frakes released a graphic novel called Knots, published by HarperCollins.

== Awards and recognition ==
- In 2007, Frakes's book Tragic Relief was awarded a grant from the Xeric Foundation.
- In 2009, Frakes's book Woman King won an Ignatz Award's Promising New Talent award.
