= Joseph Lambert =

Joseph Lambert may refer to:

- Joseph-François Lambert (1824–1873), French adventurer
- Joseph Hamilton Lambert (1825–1909), American pioneer of Oregon
- Malet Lambert (priest) (Joseph Malet Lambert), British clergyman, historian and educator
- Joseph Lambert (judge) (born 1948), former Chief Justice of the Kentucky Supreme Court
- Joseph B. Lambert (born 1940), American educator and chemist
- Adrien Lambert (Joseph Adrien Henri Lambert, 1913–2003), member of the Canadian House of Commons
- Jerome Lambert (Joseph Jerome Lambert, 1971–2007), American basketball player
- Joseph Lambert (Haitian politician) (born 1961), Haitian politician, disputed acting president of Haiti
