= Ebony Flowers =

American prose writer and cartoonist

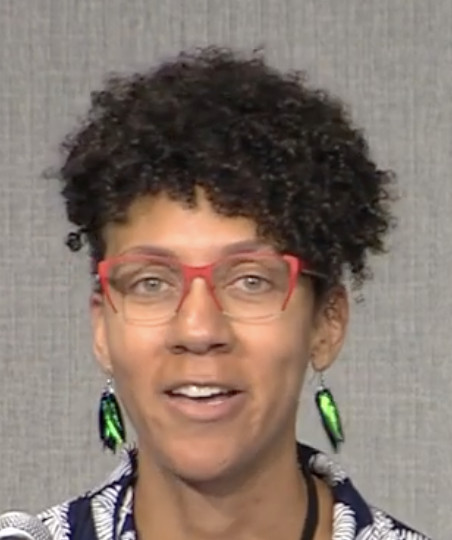
Ebony Flowers speaking at the Small Press Expo in November 2019.

Ebony Victoria Flowers is an American prose writer and cartoonist who lives in Denver. Flowers authored the graphic novel Hot Comb (2019), which contains several short story comics that are a mix of autobiographical and fiction.

She has been published in The Paris Review, The New York Times, and The New Yorker.

== Accolades ==
Flowers is a recipient of the 2017 Rona Jaffe Foundation Writers' Awards, won the 2019 Ignatz Award for Promising New Talent for My Lil Sister Lena and the 2020 Ignatz Award for Outstanding Graphic Novel for Hot Comb, and won the 2020 Eisner Award for Best Short Story for "Hot Comb".

== Education ==
Flowers received her B.A. from the University of Maryland, College Park (2002) in Applied Biological Anthropology, her M.S. and her 2017 PhD (titled 'DrawBridge' ) from the University of Wisconsin–Madison in Curriculum and Instruction.
