= Alec Longstreth =

American cartoonist

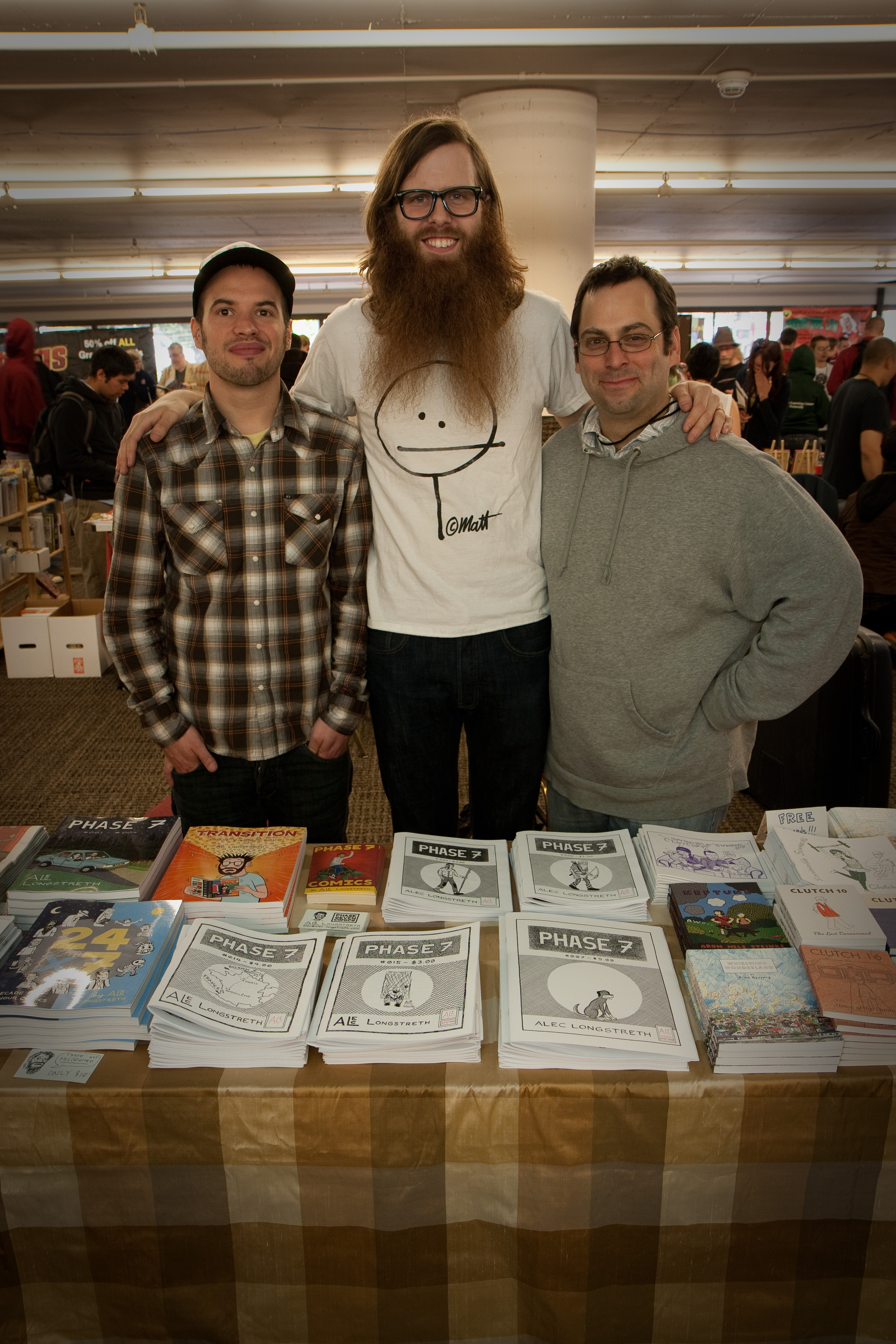
- Born: October 4, 1979 (age 47) Seattle, Washington, U.S.
- Area: Cartoonist

Alec Longstreth (born October 4, 1979) is a comics creator and illustrator living in Santa Fe, New Mexico whose works include Phase 7 and the Dvorak Zine. His webcomic Isle of Elsi was nominated for the Eisner Award for Best Webcomic in 2021 and 2022.

He is a graduate of Oberlin College and Pratt Institute.

== Awards ==
- 2005 Ignatz Award for Outstanding Minicomic (Phase 7)
- 2007 Ignatz Award for Outstanding Debut Comic (Papercutter #6)
