= Kurt Wolfgang =

Kurt Wolfgang (born Kurt W. Holley) is an American cartoonist born in New Jersey. His works include Where Hats Go, Nothing Eve and the Lowjinx series. He was arrested on February 4, 2017, in Gainesville, Florida for the assault of his girlfriend in a bar bathroom. He has not published new work since the incident.
