= Austin English =

American cartoonist and artist

- Born: Austin Robertson English; 24 October 1983 (age 43) San Francisco, CA
- Areas: Cartoonist, Artist
- Notable works: Gulag Casual

Austin English (born 1983) is an American cartoonist and artist. He works with drawing, painting and comics. His published books include Christina and Charles, The Disgusting Room and the series which he also edited, Windy Corner Magazine published by Sparkplug Books. He completed the book Gulag Casual published by 2dcloud. His illustration work can be seen in many publications, including The New York Times. He runs the publishing house Domino Books and has written for The Comics Journal.

== Personal life ==
Austin English was born 1983 in San Francisco, CA

As of January 2009, English lives and works in Brooklyn.

== Publications ==
- The Tenth Frame #1-12, 1999-2005, self-published mini-comics
- Christina and Charles, 2006, Sparkplug Books (Portland, OR)
- Windy Corner Magazine #1-3 (editor), 2007-2009, Sparkplug Books (Portland, OR)
- Sweetheart #1-5, 2008-2009, self-published mini-comics
- Devotional, 2010, self-published mini comic
- The Disgusting Room, 2011, Sparkplug Books (Portland, OR)
- The Greatest Fear (series of etchings, 13 editions), 2011, produced by artist
- I Used To Live on Ridge Street (series of etchings, 13 editions), 2011, produced by artist
- Spider Monkey #1 (w/Jesse McManus), 2012, Domino Books (Brooklyn, NY)
- The Life Problem, 2014, Drippybone Books (Los Angeles, CA)
- Low Level Enjoyment, 2015, Still Life (Atlanta, GA)
- Gulag Casual, 2016, 2dcloud (Minneapolis, MN)
- Tanti Affetti, (forthcoming, 2018)
- Meskin and Umezo, 2020, Domino Books, (Brooklyn, NY)

== Awards and nominations ==
- 2008 Ignatz Award nomination in Promising New Talent for Windy Corner #2 (editor) published by Sparkplug Comic Books
- 2008 Ignatz Award nomination in Outstanding Anthology or Collection for Windy Corner #2 (editor) published by Sparkplug Comic Books
- 2013 Ignatz Award nomination in Outstanding Anthology or Collection for Tusen Hjärtan Stark #1 (editor) published by Domino Books
- 2013 Ignatz Award nomination in Outstanding Comic for The Life Problem published by Drippybone Books

== Domino Books ==
Domino Books is a Brooklyn-based publisher and distributor of artists books, comics, and all types of printed media. It was founded in 2011 by Austin English.

Works Published by Domino Books:

- Dark Tomato #1 by Sakura Maku (2011)
- Spider Monkey #1 by Jesse McManus and Austin English (2012)
- Difficult Loves by Molly Colleen O'Connell (2013)
- Face Man by Clara Bessijelle (2013)
- Space Basket by Jonathan Petersen (2013)
- Tusen Hjartan Stark #1, edited by Austin English with art by Wiley Guillot, Warren Craghead, Joanna Hellgren and E.A. Bethea (2014)
- Tusen Hjartan Stark #2, edited by Austin English with art by Annie Pearlman, Hennessy and E.A. Bethea (2015)
- The Social Discipline Reader by Ian Sundahl, edited by Austin English (2015)
- Book of Daze by E.A Bethea (2017)
