= Sophia Foster-Dimino =

American comics artist and illustrator

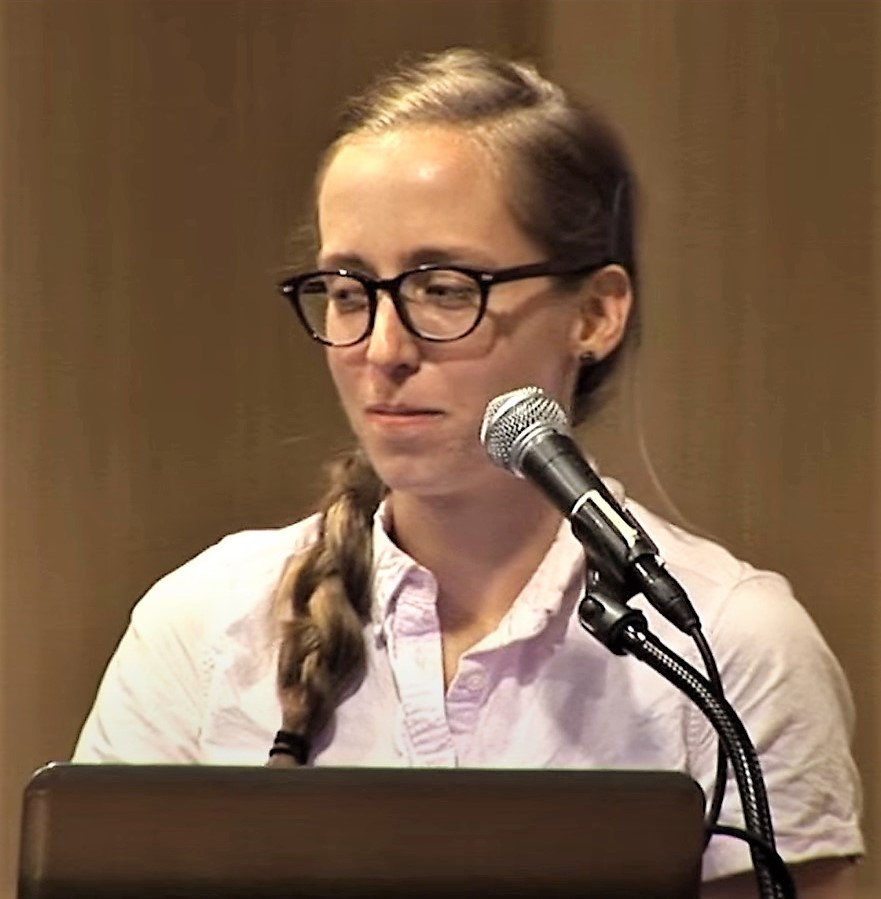
Foster-Dimino receiving Ignatz Awards in 2015

Sophia Foster-Dimino is an American comics artist and illustrator living in San Francisco.

She graduated from Rhode Island School of Design in 2010. Foster-Dimino worked for Google for four years, making commemorative logos, known as Google Doodles, before becoming a freelance illustrator.

She won three Ignatz Awards at the 2015 edition with her comic book Sex Fantasy. The work, which started as an independent zine, was published by Koyama Press in 2017. She also illustrated the webcomic Swim Thru Fire, written by Annie Mok.
