= Ivan Brunetti =

American cartoonist

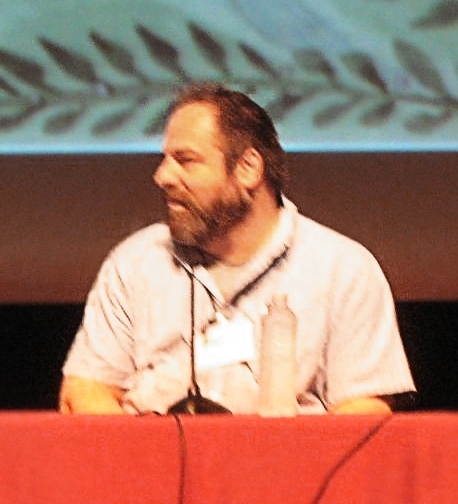
- Brunetti at "Lines on Paper" panel, Chicago 2012
- Born: October 3, 1967 (age 59) Mondavio, Italy
- Area: Cartoonist
- Notable works: Schizo; Cartooning: Philosophy and Practice
- Awards: Ignatz Award, 2006; Eisner Award, 2012

Ivan Brunetti (born October 3, 1967) is an Italian and American cartoonist and comics scholar based in Chicago.

== Early life and education ==
Brunetti was born in Mondavio, Italy, and moved to Chicago at age 8. He earned a B.A. in English Language and Literature at the University of Chicago, graduating in 1989.

== Career ==
Noted for combining blackly humorous, taboo-laden subject matter with simplified and exaggerated cartoon drawing styles, Brunetti was strongly influenced by Charles M. Schulz and Peanuts. His best known comic work is his largely autobiographical series Schizo, of which four issues appeared between 1994 and 2006, the first 3 of which have been collected as Misery Loves Comedy. Schizo #4 received the 2006 Ignatz Award for Outstanding Comic of the Year.

He has also produced two collections of gag cartoons, Haw! (2001) and Hee! (2005). He has worked as an illustrator, including cover designs for The New Yorker since 2007. His early work includes also the strip Misery Loves Comedy which he created for the University of Chicago newspaper The Maroon while a student there. The strip bears no relation to the 2007 Fantagraphics Books collection of the same name, which collects the first three issues of Schizo in their entirety, along with additional material contributed to various other publications during the same time period.

In 2005, Brunetti curated The Cartoonist's Eye, an exhibit of 75 artists' work, for the A+D Gallery of Columbia College Chicago. He then edited An Anthology of Graphic Fiction, Cartoons, and True Stories (2006, Yale University Press), which was declared a bestseller by Publishers Weekly in January 2007. The second and final volume of the anthology was released in October 2008. Brunetti also illustrated the cover of comedian Patton Oswalt's album, My Weakness Is Strong.

Brunetti's nonfiction book Cartooning: Philosophy and Practice (2011, Yale University Press) won a 2012 Eisner Award. Also in 2012, Brunetti contributed to The Guardian's "Cartoonists on the world we live in" series.

His second nonfiction book, Aesthetics: A Memoir, appeared in 2013 to positive reviews.

Later books include Wordplay (2017), 3X4 (2018), and Comics: Easy As ABC (2019), all from Toon Books.

As of 2026, he is an Adjunct Professor of Instruction (and an Associate Professor of Illustration in the Design Department) at Columbia College Chicago. At Columbia College, he previously taught classes on illustration, comics & graphic novels, visual narrative, drawing, and design.

== Bibliography ==
=== Comics ===
- Schizo #1–4 (Antarctic Press, 1994–2006)
- Haw! Horrible, Horrible Cartoons by Ivan Brunetti (Fantagraphics, 2001)
- 32 Drunks (Self-published mini-comic, 2001)
- Hee! Yet More Horrible Cartoons (Fantagraphics, 2005)

=== Collected editions ===
- Misery Loves Comedy (Fantagraphics, 2007)
- Ho! (Fantagraphics, 2007)

=== Nonfiction ===
- Cartooning: Philosophy and Practice (Yale University Press, 2011)
- Aesthetics: A Memoir (Yale University Press, 2013)

=== Children's books ===
- Wordplay (TOON Books, 2017)
- 3x4 (TOON Books, 2018)
- Comics: Easy As ABC (TOON Books, 2019)

=== Anthologies (as editor) ===
- An Anthology of Graphic Fiction, Cartoons, & True Stories (Yale University Press, 2006)
- An Anthology of Graphic Fiction, Cartoons, & True Stories, Volume 2 (Yale University Press, 2008)

=== New Yorker covers ===
- January 8, 2007
- May 7, 2007
- March 2, 2009
- September 7, 2009
- January 4, 2010
- February 15 & 22, 2010
- November 1, 2010
- May 31, 2010
- March 19, 2012
- July 1, 2013
- September 23, 2013
- November 4, 2013
- April 21, 2014
- December 15, 2014
- November 2, 2015
- September 12, 2016

=== Illustrator ===
- David Wilton (2008). Word Myths: Debunking Linguistic Urban Legends. Oxford University Press. ISBN 9780195375572.
- Cover art for Tomahawk's album Oddfellows.
- Cover art for Patton Oswalt's album My Weakness Is Strong.
