= Megan Kelso =

American comic book artist and writer (born 1968)

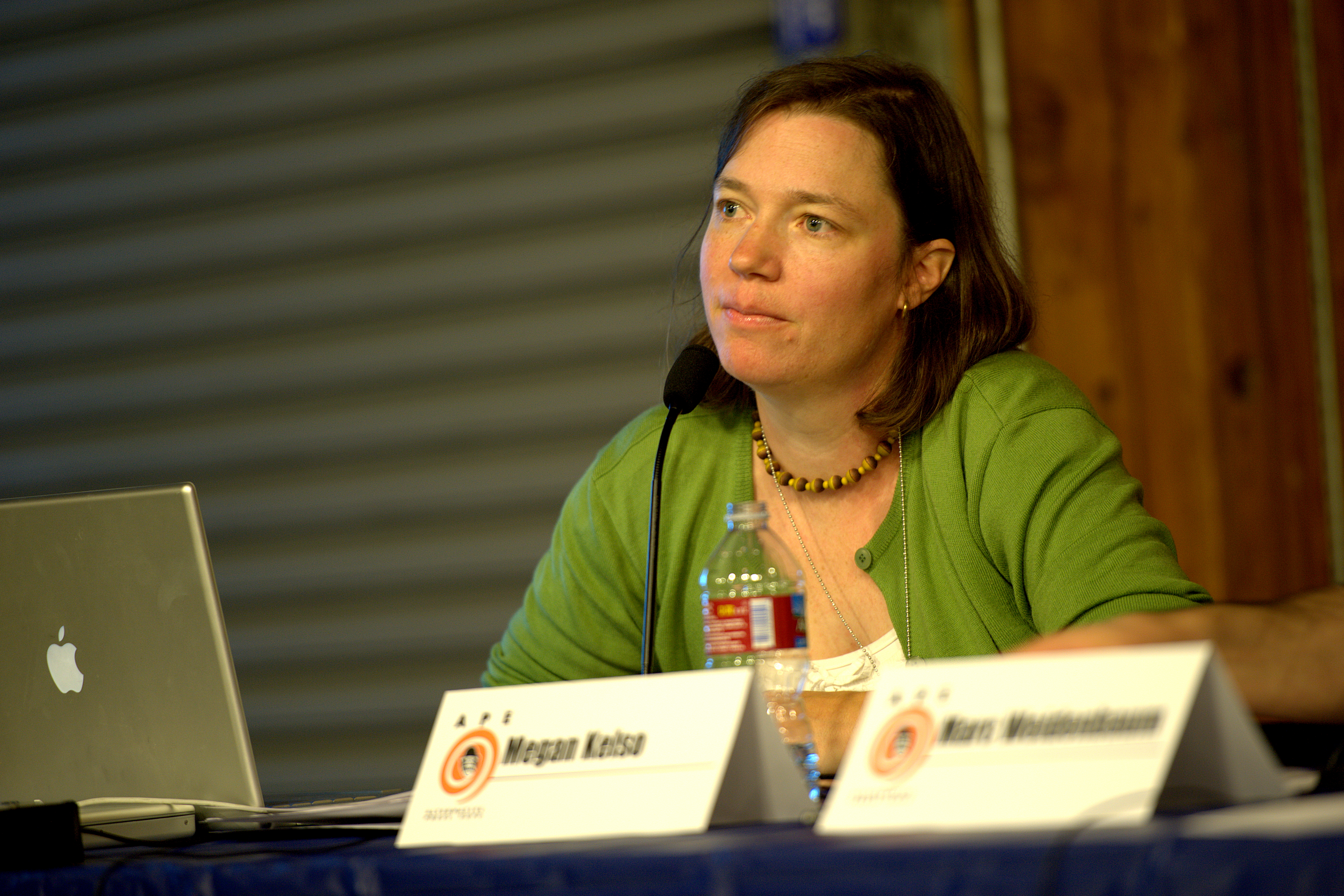
- Megan Kelso at the 2010 Alternative Press Expo
- Born: Megan Kelso; February 5, 1968 (age 58) Seattle, Washington, US
- Areas: Artist, Writer, Editor
- Notable works: Watergate Sue, Artichoke Tales, Queen of the Black Black
- Awards: 1993 Xeric Award, 2002 Ignatz Award

Megan Kelso (born February 5, 1968, in Seattle, Washington) is an American comic book artist and writer.

== Early life and education ==
Kelso was born and raised in Seattle, Washington. She attended public school. Kelso received her B.A. from Evergreen State University, where she studied history and political science. After graduating in 1991, she returned to Seattle and worked for the Port of Seattle and the City of Bellevue.

== Career ==
Kelso started working in the 1990s, with the minicomic, Girlhero, which won her a Xeric Foundation grant in 1993. She has since published several other projects including Queen of the Black Black and The Squirrel Mother. In 2004, she was the editor of the female cartoonist anthology, Scheherazade: Stories of Love, Treachery, Mothers, and Monsters (published by Soft Skull Press). This anthology showcases the work of 23 major female graphic novelists of the time, including veteran and emergent graphic novelists.

From April 1 to September 9, 2007, Kelso published a weekly comic strip in The New York Times Magazine titled Watergate Sue. Her Artichoke Tales graphic novel for Fantagraphics Books was published in 2010.

Among many other publications, Kelso had a story (which she co-created with Ron Rege) in SPX 2004, the annual anthology published by Small Press Expo (SPX). Kelso has also created work for several magazines, including the now-defunct Tower Records' Pulse Magazine.

She received two Ignatz Awards in 2002, for Outstanding Artist (for Artichoke Tales #1 and her story in Non #5) and Outstanding Minicomic (for Artichoke Tales #1).

Kelso has develop and led a workshop, "Comics for Writers," at various events, including the 2014 Seattle Graphic Novel Panel, hosted by the Graphic Artists Guild and sponsored by Fantagraphics.

In 2022, Kelso published Who Will Make the Pancakes: Five Stories, a collection of stories about motherhood, family, and love. Created over the span of 15 years, the book is informed by Kelso's journey as a mother.

== Selected bibliography ==
- The Squirrel Mother: Stories (2006), Fantagraphics Books
- Artichoke Tales (2010), Fantagraphics Books
- Queen of the Black Black (2011), Fantagraphics Books
- Who Will Make the Pancakes: Five Stories (2022) Fantagraphics Books

== Personal life ==
She is married and lives with her husband and daughter in Seattle, Washington.
