= Jillian Tamaki =

Canadian American illustrator and comic artist

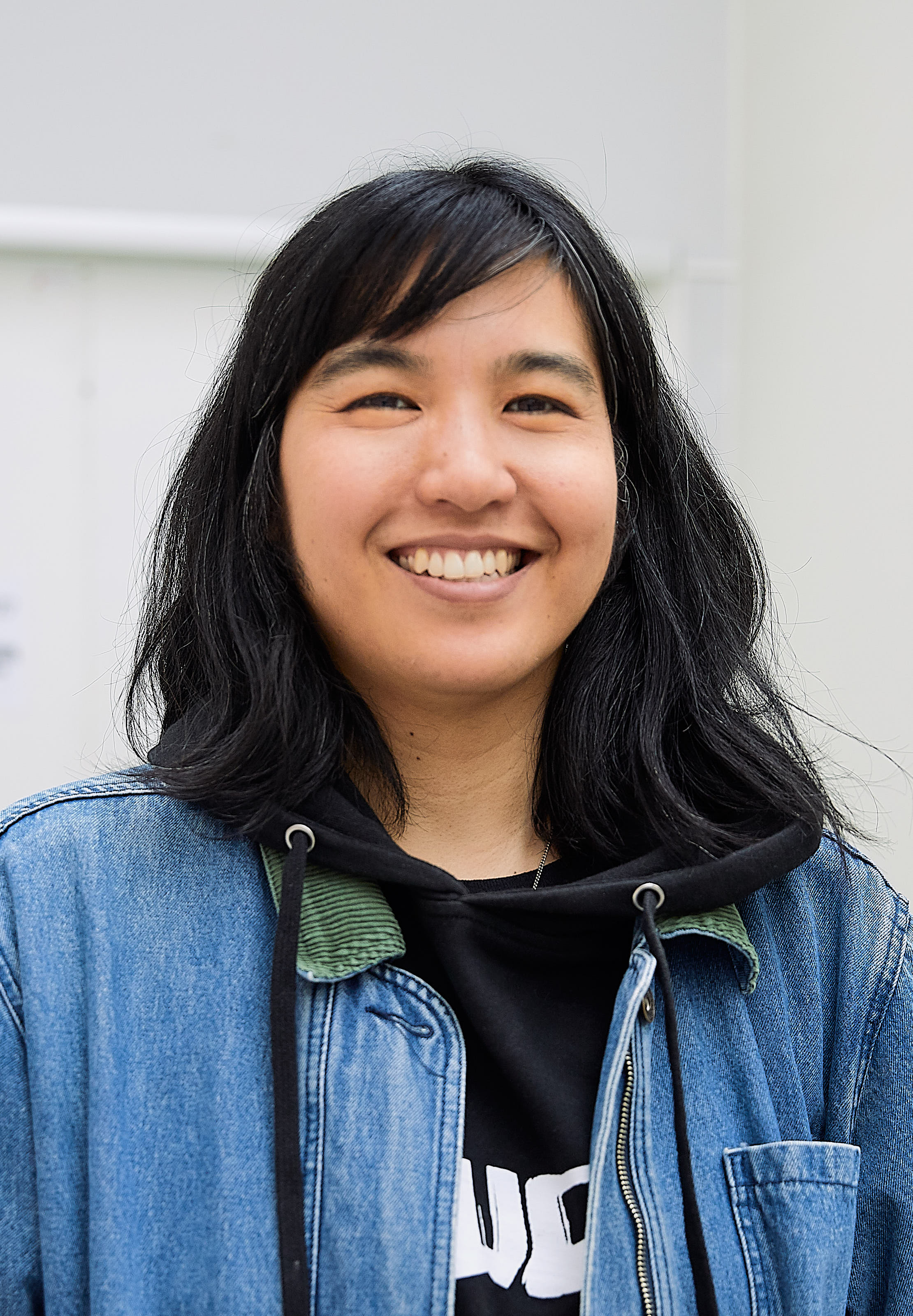
- Tamaki at the 2019 Stockholm international comics festival
- Born: April 17, 1980 (age 46); Ottawa, Ontario, Canada
- Education: Alberta College of Art and Design
- Known for: Illustrator for comics
- Notable work: Skim, This One Summer, Roaming
- Website: jilliantamaki.com

Eleanor Davis and Tamaki in discussion, 2017

Jillian Tamaki (born April 17, 1980) is a Canadian American illustrator and comic artist known for her work in The New York Times and The New Yorker in addition to the graphic novels Boundless, as well as Skim, This One Summer and Roaming written by her cousin Mariko Tamaki.

== Early life ==
Tamaki was born in Ottawa, Ontario, and grew up in Calgary, Alberta. She attended Dr. E.P. Scarlett High School and attended Queen's university for year with the intention of studying art history; she went on to study Visual Communication Design and graduate from the Alberta College of Art and Design in 2003. After graduating art school, she worked at the video game company BioWare and later taught illustration at the New York City School of Visual Arts.

== Influences and themes ==
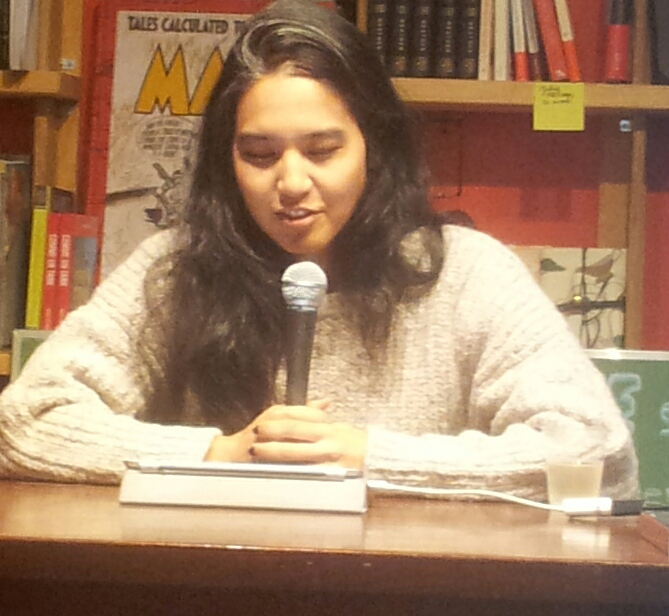
Jillian Tamaki photographed in 2017 in Montréal, Québec, Canada at the Drawn & Quarterly Bookstore

Tamaki read Archie comics and newspaper strips as a child. She submitted outfit designs into contests for Betty & Veronica comics. Her parents also had anthologies of other popular comics, including The Far Side, Calvin and Hobbes, and Herman. In high school she made zines for fun, but she had stopped reading comics after outgrowing Archie. Her interest in alternative and indie comics began while she attended college. Some of her favorite comics during this time include Bipolar by Tomer Hanuka and Asaf Hanuka, a few Drawn & Quarterly artists including Julie Doucet, Chester Brown, Seth, Michel Rabagliati, as well as books by Will Eisner. She began making mini-comics after graduating in 2003, and her very first mini-comic appears in her first book, Gilded Lilies, which was published in 2006. Tamaki often acknowledges her influences as inspirations for beginning her work as they helped her learn the basics of cartooning. She also worked on boarding for the popular television show Adventure Time.

As a self-proclaimed feminist, Tamaki is often questioned about the role this plays in her work. She also grew up in an area of Canada where she was the only mixed-race child in her school. In multiple interviews, Tamaki explains that her identity shapes the lens that she sees through, but she does not make conscious effort to work these themes into her illustrations and designs. She is interested in the female experience and viewing women as whole human beings in an industry that often sexualized women's bodies. Being shaped by feminism and race, her work aims to include diverse characters that readers can better identify with.

== Career ==
Gilded Lilies (2006) is Tamaki's first published book and is a collection of Tamaki's illustrations and comic strips. The first part of the book comprises a carefully selected assemblage of paintings, personal drawings, illustrations and comics. The second part consists of a wordless graphic narrative titled The Tapemines, which tells the story of two children in a surreal landscape featuring "forests of cassette tape".

Skim (2008) is a critically acclaimed graphic novel illustrated by Jillian and written by her cousin Mariko Tamaki. It tells the story of a young high-school girl and touches on themes of friendship, suicide, sexuality, and identity.

Indoor Voice (2010) collects Tamaki's drawings, illustrations and comic strips and is part of publisher Drawn & Quarterly's Petit Livre series. The majority of the book is printed in black and white, but it also features some colour illustrations. Indoor Voice was released to mixed reviews.

"Now & then & when" (2008), a drawing with ink and graphite, was purchased by the Library of Congress in 2011. Within a two-panel horizontal, she depicted herself as a central, monumental figure, flanked by smaller full length figures of herself from infancy to adulthood on the left, from middle age to elderly on the right. Tamaki's variation on the theme with figures in bathing suits, related vignettes and speech balloons, presents an updated counterpart to the demure figures and texts of artistic precedents.

This One Summer (2014) by Mariko and Jillian Tamaki is a graphic novel that centres on the experiences of close friends Rose and Windy, who are on the cusp of adolescence, during a summer holiday. This One Summer won a 2014 Ignatz Award, the 2015 Printz Honor, the Caldecott Honor, the 2015 Eisner Award, and the 2014 Governor General's Awards for Children's Literature — Illustration category.

In 2015, Drawn & Quarterly published SuperMutant Magic Academy, a collection of Tamaki's web comic of the same name from 2010 to 2014. Previously, these comics won an Ignatz Award in 2012 for Outstanding Online Comic.

In June 2017, Drawn & Quarterly published Tamaki's graphic novel Boundless, a collection of short stories. The book received rave reviews. A review in The Atlantic described the book as "an ambitious and eclectic set of tales, [that] focuses on the interior lives of unexpected subjects." Other reviews called Boundless a "picture-perfect" collection and as "a showcase for Tamaki's mercurial style." NPR and Publishers Weekly named Boundless as one of the best graphic novels of the year.

Roaming, created with Mariko Tamaki, was shortlisted for the 2024 Lambda Literary Award for Graphic Novel. Roaming won the 2024 Eisner Award for Best Graphic Album, with Tamaki herself winning the 2024 Eisner for Best Penciler/Inker.

Tamaki hand-embroidered three book covers for Penguin. The covers were designed for three classic literature books: Emma by Jane Austen, The Secret Garden by Frances Hodgson Burnett, and Black Beauty by Anna Sewell. In her free time, she also makes quilts as a hobby.

In September 2020, Tamaki published Our Little Kitchen, an illustrated book about cooking in a community kitchen.

=== Controversy ===
Tamaki became the center of controversy when Mariko Tamaki alone was nominated for the Governor General's Literary Award for Skim. The comics community and others circulated an open letter to the Awards Committee that argued for Tamaki as a co-nominee, which was signed by notable comics artists such as Lynda Barry, Dan Clowes, and Julie Doucet. They state in the letter:

In illustrated novels, the words carry the burden of telling the story, and the illustrations serve as a form of visual reinforcement. But in graphic novels, the words and pictures BOTH tell the story, and there are often sequences (sometimes whole graphic novels) where the images alone convey the narrative. The text of a graphic novel cannot be separated from its illustrations because the words and the pictures together ARE the text. Try to imagine evaluating Skim if you couldn't see the drawings. Jillian's contribution to the book goes beyond mere illustration: she was as responsible for telling the story as Mariko was.

This One Summer, created by Mariko and Jillian Tamaki, ranked #1 on the list of top ten most banned and challenged books in the US in 2016. The main reasons this book was challenged were for its LGBT characters, drug use and profanity, sexually explicit content, and mature themes.

== Bibliography ==
- Gilded Lilies. Conundrum Press. 2006.
- Indoor Voice. (Drawn & Quarterly, 2010) ISBN 978-1770460140
- Frontier #7: SexCoven. (Youth In Decline, 2015)
- SuperMutant Magic Academy. (Drawn & Quarterly, 2015) ISBN 1770461981
- Boundless. (Drawn & Quarterly, 2017) ISBN 9781770462878
- They Say Blue. (Abrams, 2018) ISBN 9781419728518
- Our Little Kitchen. Groundwood Books, 2020 ISBN 9781419746550
- "Junban". Comics. The New Yorker. 96 (42): 52–57. December 28, 2020.

=== Co-created with Mariko Tamaki ===
- Skim (Groundwood Books, 2008) ISBN 978-0-88899-753-1
- This One Summer (First Second Books; Groundwood Books, 2014) ISBN 978-1-59643-774-6
- Roaming (Drawn & Quarterly, 2023) ISBN 978-1-77046-433-9

=== As illustrator ===
- Twenty Thousand Leagues Under the Sea (The Folio Society, 2014)
- Gertie's Leap to Greatness by Kate Beasley (Farrar, Straus, and Giroux, 2016) ISBN 9780374302610
- My Best Friend by Julie Fogliano (Atheneum, 2020) ISBN 9781534427228

=== As editor ===
- The Best American Comics 2019 (Houghton Mifflin Harcourt, 2019) ISBN 9780358067283
