= Debbie Drechsler =

American cartoonist

- Born: 1953 (age 72–73) Champaign, Illinois, U.S.
- Area: Cartoonist
- Notable works: Daddy's Girl; The Summer of Love

Debbie Drechsler (born 1953) is an American illustrator and comic book creator. Her semi-autobiographical graphic novel about incest, Daddy's Girl (1996), was nominated for an Ignatz Award.

== Biography ==
Drechsler was born in Champaign, Illinois, in 1953. She knew early in life that she wanted to make art of some kind. She studied at the Rochester Institute of Technology.

In the 1970s, she discovered the feminist movement as well as alternative comics. She was originally encouraged to draw comics by fellow cartoonists Richard Sala and Michael Dougan.

In 1992, she got her first piece published by Drawn & Quarterly. Her work later appeared in the Kitchen Sink Press anthology Twisted Sisters, edited by Diane Noomin.

In 1996, her first graphic novel was Daddy's Girl, published by Fantagraphics. It was a semi-autobiographical story dealing with difficult subjects such as rape and incest. It was nominated for an Ignatz Award and also appeared as #81 in The Comics Journal's "Top 100 Comics list" in February 1999.

In 2002, her new graphic novel was The Summer of Love, released by Drawn & Quarterly. Inspired by Wimmen's Comix, Peanuts, and Mad Magazine, it was also partly based on Drechsler's own experiences dealing with typical teenage emotions such as alienation, confusion, and anger. This book is a collection of issues 1-5 of Nowhere. Drechsler has since largely left comics work to concentrate on commercial art.

Drechsler used to live in upstate New York, but she is currently living in Santa Rosa, California.
