= Anders Nilsen (cartoonist) =

American cartoonist

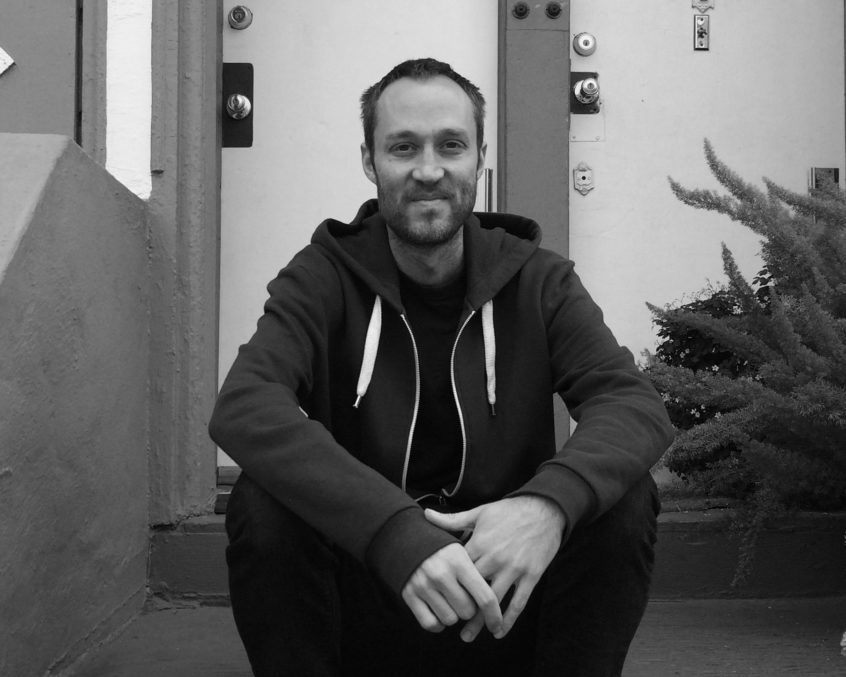
- Born: Anders Brekhus Nilsen; 1973 (age 52–53)
- Area: Cartoonist
- Notable works: Big Questions; Don't Go Where I Can't Follow; Dogs and Water

Anders Brekhaus Nilsen (born 1973) is an American cartoonist who lives in Los Angeles, California.

== Biography ==
Nilsen graduated with an art degree from the University of New Mexico in 1996. He moved to Chicago in 1999 to get a Master of Fine Arts in painting, but dropped out after one year.

Nilsen's comics have appeared in the anthologies Kramers Ergot and Mome. His graphic novel Dogs and Water won an Ignatz Award in 2005. An excerpt from Dogs and Water was featured in the inaugural 2006 edition of the Best American Comics anthology, and the book was expanded and reissued in hardcover in 2007. In 2007, Nilsen won an Ignatz Award for his graphic memoir, Don't Go Where I Can't Follow, in 2012, he won an Ignatz Award for Big Questions, a collected edition of his comic book series and two more Ignatz Awards in 2025 for Outstanding Artist and Outstanding Comic for Tongues Supplement #1.

Nilsen is co-founder of Autoptic, a bi-annual festival of independent comics and art culture that takes place in Minneapolis. He is also one of the organizers of comics residency Pierre Feuille Ciseaux at the Angoulême International Comics Festival. Nilsen has been regularly holding lectures and workshops at various organizations, including Chulalongkorn University in Bangkok, Forecast program in Berlin, Center for the Humanities at the University of Wisconsin, Center for Cartoon Studies, and Stanford University.

== Awards ==
- 2001: Xeric Award for The Ballad of the Two-Headed Boy
- 2005: Ignatz Award for Dogs and Water
- 2007: Ignatz Award for Don't Go Where I Can't Follow
- 2012: Ignatz Award for Big Questions
- 2012: Lynd Ward Graphic Novel Prize for Big Questions
- 2025: Ignatz Award (2) for Tongues Supplement #1
- 2026: Guggenheim Fellowship in Fiction.

== Selected works ==
- Dogs and Water, Drawn & Quarterly, October 2004, ISBN 978-1-894937-77-1
- Monologues for the Coming Plague, Fantagraphics, 2006, ISBN 978-1-56097-718-6
- Don’t Go Where I Can’t Follow, Drawn & Quarterly, 2006 (reissued 2012), ISBN 1-897299-14-1
- The End, Fantagraphics, Coconino Press, January 2007, ISBN 978-1-56097-814-5
- Monologues for Calculating the Destiny of Black Holes, Fantagraphics, January 2009, ISBN 978-156097-980-7
- Big Questions, Drawn & Quarterly, June 2011, ISBN 978-1-77046-047-8
- Rage of Poseidon, Drawn & Quarterly, October 2013, ISBN 978-177046-128-4
- God and the Devil at War in the Garden, May 2015, Self Published
- Poetry is Useless, Drawn & Quarterly, September 2015, ISBN 978-177046-207-6
- A Walk in Eden, Drawn & Quarterly, October 2016, ISBN 978-177046-266-3
- In Your Next Life You Will Be Together With All of Your Friends, No Miracles Press, March 2021, ISBN 978-0-9992202-3-8
- Tongues, Volume 1, Pantheon, March 2025, ISBN 978-1-5247-4720-6
- Every Day Is Today, No Miracles Press, January 2026, ISBN 978-0-9992202-8-3
