= Kevin Huizenga =

American cartoonist (born 1977)

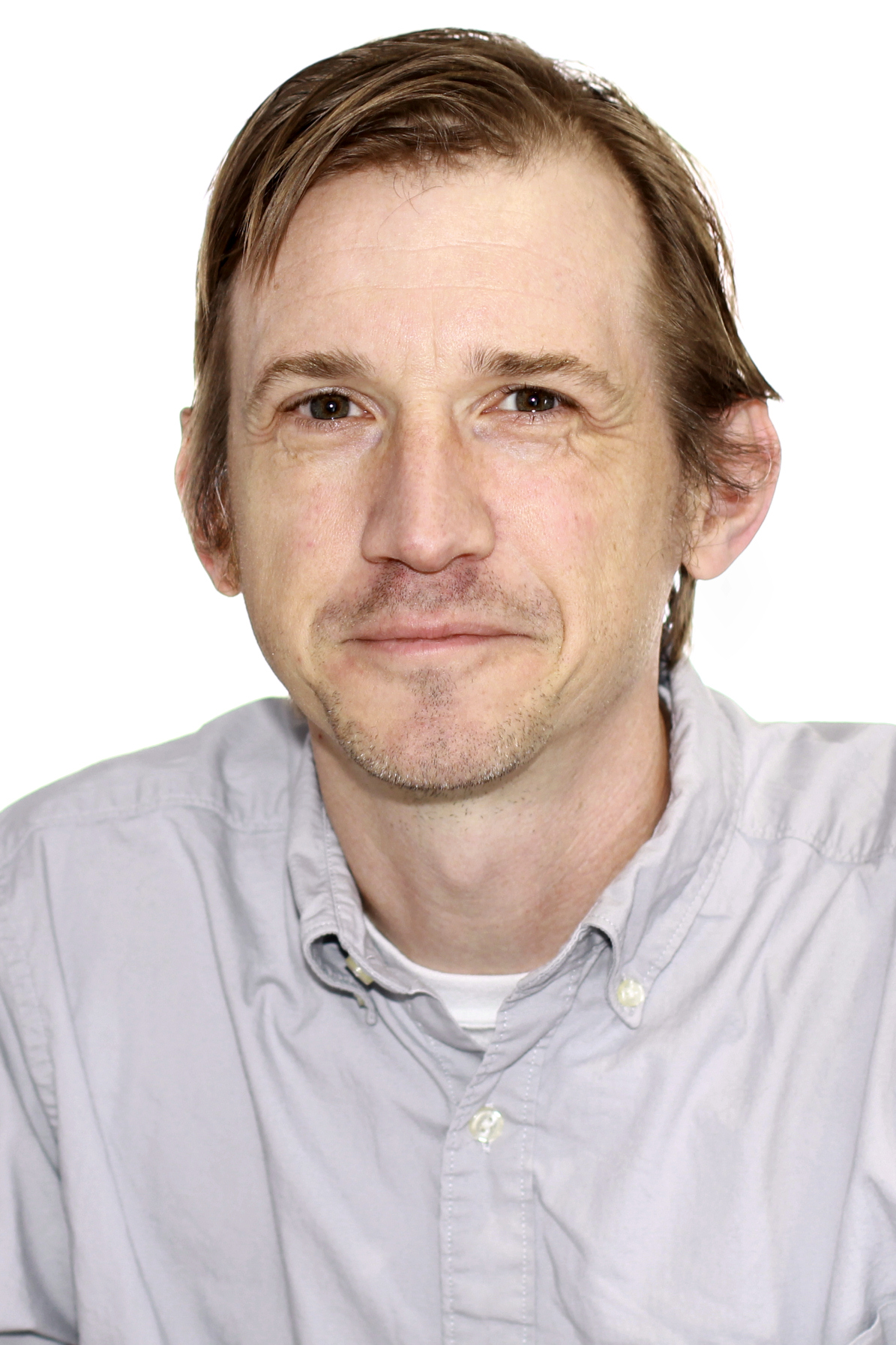
- Huizenga at the 2019 Texas Book Festival
- Born: March 29, 1977 (age 49) Harvey, Illinois
- Areas: Writer, penciller, inker
- Notable works: Curses; Ganges (collected as The River at Night); Or Else

Kevin Huizenga (born March 29, 1977 in Harvey, Illinois) is an American cartoonist, best known as the creator of the comics character Glenn Ganges, who appears in most of his work.

== Biography ==
Kevin created the minicomic Supermonster (1993–2001) while he was still in high school. This is where the character of Glenn Ganges first appeared. The first issue of Huizenga's ongoing Or Else comic received the Ignatz Award for Outstanding Comic in 2005. Both Or Else and a collection of works, Curses were included on Time Magazine's list of the Top Ten comics of 2005 and 2006, respectively.

Since February 2008, Kevin Huizenga has published a comic strip called Amazing Facts and Beyond with Leon Beyond in the St Louis Riverfront Times with cartoonists Dan Zettwoch and Ted May. New strips appear three times a month.

== Bibliography ==
=== Books ===
- The River at Night, Drawn & Quarterly (2019)
- Amazing Facts and Beyond with Leon Beyond with Dan Zettwoch, Uncivilized Books (2013)
- Gloriana, Drawn & Quarterly (2012)
- Alla Prima (2012)
- Wild Kingdom, Drawn & Quarterly (2010)
- Curses, Drawn & Quarterly (2006)

=== Comic Books ===
- Ganges #1-5, Fantagraphics (2006 - 2016)
- Or Else #1-5, Drawn & Quarterly (2004 - 2008)
- Fight or Run: Shadow of the Chopper, Buenaventura Press (2008)
- New Construction #1-2
- Sermons #1-2
- The Feathered Ogre: Designs and Sketches
- Super Monster #1-14

=== Anthologies with his stories ===
- Kramers Ergot 8, PictureBox
- Kramers Ergot 7, Buenaventura Press
- Kramers Ergot 5, Buenaventura Press
- Showcase #1, Drawn & Quarterly
- Orchid, Sparkplug Comics
- Bogus Dead
- Impossible (Magazines #1 & #3)
- The Best American Comics 2007, Houghton Mifflin
- The Best American Comics 2009, Houghton Mifflin

== Awards ==
- 2010 Ignatz Award for Outstanding Series for Ganges
- 2007 Ignatz Award for Outstanding Anthology or Collection for Curses
- 2006 Ignatz Award for Outstanding Story for Ganges #1
- 2005 Ignatz Award for Outstanding Comic for Or Else #1
- 2004 Ignatz Award for Outstanding Story for “Glenn Ganges”, Drawn & Quarterly Showcase Volume 1
