= Ignatz Award for Outstanding Online Comic =

US comics and cartooning award

Ignatz Award
- Awarded for: Outstanding achievements in comics and cartooning by small press creators or creator-owned projects published by larger publishers
- Location: Bethesda, Maryland
- Country: United States
- Presented by: Ignatz Award Committee
- Hosted by: Small Press Expo
- First award: 2001
- Website: www.smallpressexpo.com/ignatz-awards

The Ignatz Award for Outstanding Online Comic, established in 2001 as part of the Ignatz Awards, is an annual literary award that recognizes outstanding achievements in comics and cartooning by small press creators or creator-owned projects published by larger publishers. The award for outstanding online comic is presented for webcomic, including "an individual comic, continuing storyline comic or strips" and not including animated content. To be eligible, the comic must first be published online rather than in print.

== Recipients ==
Year	Creator(s)	Work	Result	Ref.
2001	Ignatz Awards cancelled after 9-11 Attacks			
2001	Ben Jones	Future Genies of Mush Past	Finalist	
2001	Scott McCloud	I Can't Stop Thinking	Finalist	
2001	Jonathan Morris	Jeremy	Finalist	
2001	demian5	When I Am King	Finalist	
2001	Scott McCloud	Zot! Hearts and Minds	Finalist	
2002	Jason Little	Bee	Winner	
2002	Tom Hart	Hutch Owen: Public Relations	Finalist	
2002	Jordan Crane	Keeping Two	Finalist	
2002	Derek Kirk Kim	Small Stories	Finalist	
2002	Tracy White	Traced	Finalist	
2003	James Kochalka	American Elf	Winner	
2003	Nick Bertozzi	The Salon	Finalist	
2003	Gabrielle Bell	Bell's Home Journal	Finalist	
2003	Ted Slampyak	Jazz Age	Finalist	
2003	Jesse Reklaw	Slow Wave	Finalist	
2004	James Kochalka	American Elf	Winner	
2004	Timothy Kreider	The Pain ... When Will it End?	Finalist	
2004	Patrick Farley	Apocamon	Finalist	
2004	J.J. Naas	Desert Rocks	Finalist	
2004	Craig Boldman	Tailipoe	Finalist	
2005	Nicholas Gurewitch	The Perry Bible Fellowship	Winner	
2005	deadmouse	Ballad	Finalist	
2005	Kazu Kibuishi	Copper	Finalist	
2005	Jenn Manley Lee	Dicebox	Finalist	
2005	Steve Manale	Superslackers	Finalist	
2006	Nicholas Gurewitch	The Perry Bible Fellowship	Winner	
2006	David Hellman and Dale Beran	A Lesson Is Learned But The Damage Is Irreversible	Finalist	
2006	Ronnie Casson	Claviger	Finalist	
2006	Renée French	Micrographica	Finalist	
2006	Joey Alison Sayers	Thingpart	Finalist	
2007	Chris Onstad	Achewood	Winner	
2007	Kris Dresen	Grace	Finalist	
2007	Nick Bertozzi	Persimmon Cup	Finalist	
2007	Joey Alison Sayers	Thingpart	Finalist	
2007	David Malki	Wondermark	Finalist	
2008	Chris Onstad	Achewood	Winner	
2008	David King	Danny Dutch	Finalist	
2008	Jesse Reklaw	Slow Wave	Finalist	
2008	Joey Alison Sayers	Thingpart	Finalist	
2008	Tracy White	Traced	Finalist	
2009	Cayetano Garza	Year of the Rat	Winner	
2009	Dash Shaw	Bodyworld	Finalist	
2009	David King	Danny Dutch	Finalist	
2009	Joey Alison Sayers	Thingpart	Finalist	
2009	Vanessa Davis	Tablet comics	Finalist	
2010	Mike Dawson	Troop 142	Winner	
2010	Stephen Gilpin	The Lesttrygonians	Finalist	
2010	John Callahan	Callahan Online	Finalist	
2010	Sarah Becan	I Think You're Sauceome	Finalist	
2010	David King	Reliable Comics	Finalist	
2011	Kate Beaton	Hark! A Vagrant	Winner	
2011	Pascal Girard	A Cartoonist's Diary	Finalist	
2011	Nate Marsh	Alphabet Horror	Finalist	
2011	Tony Breed	Finn and Charlie are Hitched	Finalist	
2011	Gabrielle Bell	Lucky	Finalist	
2012	Jillian Tamaki	SuperMutant Magic Academy	Winner	
2012	Dan Zettwoch and Kevin Huizenga	Amazing Facts...and Beyond! with Leon Beyond	Finalist	
2012	Julia Gfrörer	Black Is the Color	Finalist	
2012	Gabrielle Bell	Lucky	Finalist	
2012	Kris Straub	Starslip	Finalist	
2013	Jillian Tamaki	SuperMutant Magic Academy	Winner	
2013	Annie Szabla	Bird Boy	Finalist	
2013	Ken Dahl and Gabby Schulz	Gabby's Playhouse	Finalist	
2013	Sam Alden	Haunter	Finalist	
2013	Gabrielle Bell	July Diary	Finalist	
2014	Evan Dahm	Vattu	Winner	
2014	Anya Davidson	Band for Life	Finalist	
2014	Dane Martin	Big Dogs at Nite	Finalist	
2014	Jason Shiga	Demon	Finalist	
2014	Pete Toms	On Hiatus	Finalist	
2015	Lilli Carré	The Bloody Footprint	Winner	
2015	Lauren Weinstein	Carriers	Finalist	
2015	Rebecca Roher	Mom Body	Finalist	
2015	Blue Delliquanti	O Human Star	Finalist	
2015	Ariel Ries	Witchy	Finalist	
2016	Meredith Gran	Octopus Pie	Winner	
2016	Rina Ayuyang	A Cartoonist's Diary	Finalist	
2016	Samantha Leriche-Gionet	A Small Revolution	Finalist	
2016	Glynnis Fawkes	Just Doing My Job	Finalist	
2016	Evan Dahm	Vattu	Finalist	
2017	Der-shing Helmer	The Meek	Winner	
2017	Amanda Scurti	Disability in the Age of Trump	Finalist	
2017	Lauren Weinstein	Normal Person/Maine Vacation	Finalist	
2017	Mike Dawson	That's Not Who We Are	Finalist	
2017	Aminder Dhaliwal	Woman World	Finalist	
2018	Carta Monir	Lara Croft Was My Family	Winner	
2018	Brian Files	A Fire Story	Finalist	
2018	Meg O'Shea	A Part of Me is Still Unknown	Finalist	
2018	Jesse England	The Wolves Outside	Finalist	
2018	Aminder Dhaliwal	Woman World	Finalist	
2019	Hannah Blumenreich	Full Court Crush	Winner	
2019	Nate Powell	About Face	Finalist	
2019	Alec Longstreth	Isle of Elsi	Finalist	
2019	Hannako Lambert	That's Not My Name!	Finalist	
2019	Nathan Gray	What Doctors Know About CPR	Finalist	
2020	Ariel Ries	Witchy	Winner	
2020	Gabby Schulz	Gabby Schulz	Finalist	
2020	Breena Nuñez	I Exist	Finalist	
2020	Isabella Rotman	Like the Tide	Finalist	
2020	Joe Seosamh and C. Anka	SUPERPOSE	Finalist	
2021	Michael DeForge	Birds of Maine	Winner	
2021	Shing Yin Khor	I Do Not Want to Write Today	Finalist	
2021	Ashanti Fortson	Leaf Lace	Finalist	
2021	Alec Robbins	Mr. Boop	Finalist	
2021	Susannah Lohr	Shadows Become You	Finalist	
2022	Mars Heyward	Ride or Die	Winner	
2022	Reimena Yee	Alexander, the Servant & the Water of Life	Finalist	
2022	Adam de Souza	Blind Alley	Finalist	
2022	Amy Kurzweil	Technofeelia Vol. 4 'Help'	Finalist	
2022	Evan Dahm	Vattu	Finalist	
2023	Reimena Yee	The God of Arepo	Winner	
2023	Blue Delliquanti	Adversary	Finalist	
2023	Lonnie Mann	Growing Up, and Getting Out	Finalist	
2023	Jett Allen	Trans Classic Movies	Finalist	
2023	Mara Ramirez	Whale Fall	Finalist	
2024	Shazleen Khan	Buuza!!	Winner	
2024	James Lawrence	The Legend of Mariposa	Finalist	
2024	Aria Villafranca and Matthew Fisher	In the Shadow of Giants	Finalist	
2024	Emily Zilber	Marigold	Finalist	
2024	SE Case	Rigsby Wi	Finalist	
2025	Otava Heikkilä	Home by the Rotting Sea	Winner	
2025	Evan Dahm	3rd Voice	Finalist	
2025	KC Councilor	An Ode to People	Finalist	
2025	Michael Grover	Jake Spooky	Finalist	
2025	Barbara Perez Marquez and Rhinosnax	Kiss the Cook	Finalist	
2026	Adam de Souza	Blind Alley	Winner	
2026	Sinan Demirer	Anywhere but Barbun	Finalist	
2026	Cedar Van Tassel	Appleguy & Beefwood	Finalist	
2026	Hagai Palevsky and Justin LaGuff	I Thought I Heard Your Voice Just Then	Finalist	
2026	Lucy Haslam	Island	Finalist	

== Writers with multiple wins ==
The following writers have won the award more than once:

Two

- Nicholas Gurewitch
- James Kochalka
- Chris Onstad
- Jillian Tamaki

== Writers with multiple nominations ==
The following writers have won the award more than once:

Four

- Gabrielle Bell
- Evan Dahm
- Joey Alison Sayers

Three

- David King

Two

- Nick Bertozzi
- Mike Dawson
- Adam de Souza
- Blue Delliquanti
- Aminder Dhaliwal
- Nicholas Gurewitch
- James Kochalka
- Scott McCloud
- Chris Onstad
- Jesse Reklaw
- Ariel Ries
- Lauren Weinstein
- Tracy White
- Reimena Yee
