= Ghostbusters (comics) =

Comic book series

- Peter Venkman and Ray Stanz of the Ghostbusters battle a ghostly animated Tyrannosaurus skeleton. From The Real Ghostbusters Vol.2 #4. From NOW Comics.

Publication information
- Publisher: Marvel Comics; Now Comics; 88MPH Studios; IDW Comics; Dark Horse Comics
- Schedule: Monthly
- Format: Ongoing series
- Genre: Science fiction

The Ghostbusters franchise spawned various comic books published by various comic book companies through the years starting in 1988 and continuing to the present day. These comics have ranged from being based on The Real Ghostbusters animated series, to the 1984 film.

== The Real Ghostbusters ==
The very first comic book addition to the Ghostbusters franchise was The Real Ghostbusters. It was a comic series based on the animated series of the same name. NOW Comics and Marvel Comics shared the comic book rights to the property. NOW Comics had the rights for publication in North America, while Marvel had the rights in Europe. Marvel published the series in Europe through their Marvel UK imprint. Some of the Marvel UK issues reprinted material from the NOW Comics series, and vice versa. Publication of the series began on March 28, 1988.

=== NOW Comics ===
NOW Comics began their series in August 1988. The series ran for two volumes, two annuals and one special. The first volume ran for 28 issues. The series was primarily written by James Van Hise, with the exceptions being issue 4 by La Morris Richmond and issue 21 which featured Marvel UK reprints due to production delays. John Tobias, Phillip Hester, Evan Dorkin and Howard Bender were among the pencilers for the series.

The series was on hiatus for a time due to the publisher's financial difficulties, but was subsequently re-launched. The second volume ran for four issues, one special (The Real Ghostbusters Spectacular 3-D Special) and two annuals (one regular and one 3-D). The series had a main story that ran from the 3-D Special through issue 4, followed by back-up stories reprinted from the Marvel UK run. They also contained game pages and health tips for kids and parents. Several issues of volume 1 and the main issues of volume 2 used covers taken from the Marvel UK run.

NOW Comics also published a 3 issue miniseries in 1989 called Real Ghostbusters Starring in Ghostbusters II that was collected as a trade paperback.

A spin-off series of the popular Ghostbusters character Slimer was also published. NOW Comics published a series that ran 19 issues from 1989 through 1990, as well as spawning a one shot special called The Real Ghostbusters 3-D Slimer Special. Some of these issues were reprinted as a tradepaperback in 1991.

When IDW Publishing licensed the comic book rights to the Ghostbusters property, they began to reprint the Now Comics series in a multi-volume series of trade-paperbacks called The Real Ghostbusters Omnibus. beginning in October 2012.

=== Marvel UK ===
Marvel UK published a magazine-sized comic for 193 issues that also spawned 4 annuals and 10 specials. The series started its run on March 28, 1988, starting five months before the NOW Comics series. Each issue contained three to four comic stories, a prose story alternating from a regular tale to one narrated by Winston Zeddemore, a prose entry of Egon Spengler’s Spirit Guide typically discussing the entities in the comic, a bio of a character or ghost that appeared in the series, and a short Slimer strip. The comics featured a rotating line-up of creators, including John Carnell, Dan Abnett, Andy Lanning, Brian Williamson, Anthony Williams, Stuart Place, Richard Starkings, and Helen Stone.

The series ran weekly and eventually began to feature reprints from the American comics as well as stories that appeared previously in the series. The American comics were often broken up into four to five parts, and incorporated the failed Slimer! series beginning with issue 121. The last original story ran in issue 171 with the remaining issues being reprints from the earlier comics and the American books.

Four annual comics were produced in a hardcover format. Each book contained several comic strips, full-page Slimer strips, and prose stories. The books also included game and activity pages, and reprints of bios found in the regular books.

Some of these issues were collected by Titan Books into trade paperbacks. These include:

- A Hard Day's Fright (collects The Real Ghostbusters #1–7, 9, 11, 19, 50 and 99, 96 pages, October 2005, Titan Books, ISBN 1-84576-140-5)
- Who You Gonna Call? (collects The Real Ghostbusters #12, 16, 19, 24, 33, 48, 52 and 53, 1989 Annual, 1990 Annual, 1992 Annual, 96 pages, April 2006, Titan Books, ISBN 1-84576-141-3)
- Which Witch Is Which? (96 pages, July 2006, Titan Books, ISBN 1-84576-142-1)
- This Ghost Is Toast! (96 pages, November 2006, Titan Books, ISBN 1-84576-143-X)

Marvel UK also reprinted NOW Comics' tradepaperback Real Ghostbusters Starring in Ghostbusters II in 1989 as well as reprinting various issues as a compendium called The Real Ghostbusters: The Giggling Ghoul and Other Stories also in 1989.

Outside of the ongoing title, the Ghostbusters were also featured in the 32-issue run of The Marvel Bumper Comic. It was an anthology style comic that was published by Marvel UK from 1988 to 1989, and that featured strips adapting different characters and properties. The first 13 issues were published bi-weekly, with issues 14-31 being released on a weekly basis. There was also a "Holiday Special" issue released in late 1988.

Like Now Comics, Marvel UK also published a series revolving around Slimer in 1989–90, which lasted 13 issues. Slimer was also the cover character for all 17 issues of It's Wicked!, released in 1989.

=== Welsh Publishing Group ===
The publishing company Welsh Publishing Group Inc published The Real Ghostbusters Magazine. A 7-issue magazine that ran from 1989 to 1991 and reprinted a few of the issues from both the NOW Comics and Marvel UK comic series.

== 88MPH Studios ==
Over ten years after the end of The Real Ghostbusters comic books, the property returned to comics courtesy of the Quebec-based comic company 88MPH Studios. 88MPH published a 4 issue mini-series titled Ghostbusters: Legion that ran from February through May 2004. It was written by Andrew Dabb with pencils by Steve Kurth and inks by Serge LaPointe. Unlike the previous comics, this title (as well as future titles by other publishing companies) would be presenting the characters the way they were portrayed in the original 1984 film but set in 2004 instead of 1984, more serious themed and less cartoonish than The Real Ghostbusters series.

The storyline of Legion saw the return of the four Ghostbusters and the principal cast from the movie. Set six months on from the Gozer incident (in this universe having occurred in 2004) the series was designed to follow the Ghostbusters as their initial fame faded and they returned to the regular chore of busting ghosts on a daily basis. The series sees the team run ragged as a spate of supernatural crimes and other related occurrences plague the city.

Prior to its release, the miniseries featured 5 pieces of promotional artwork featuring all 4 Ghostbusters. Two other pieces of promotional artwork were also featured on the back of the comic books once the miniseries had begun. These featured a promo of a melting Stay Puft Marshmallow Man featuring the phrase "S'mores Anyone?" and a promo of Slimer featuring the phrase "Vermin Problems?"

A special 'Christmas card' was created specially for the site, drawn by well-known Ghostbusters prop member Sean Bishop and colored by one of the comic production staff.

Outside of the 4 issue series a "#0 issue" was planned. Featuring a story entitled The Zeddemore Factor, it was to have been released before the Legion mini-series, but was eventually released as a convention exclusive at San Diego Comic-Con stall operated by 88MPH Studios to help promote the comic.

=== Planned ongoing series ===
Originally planned for a June 2004 release to coincide with the 20th Anniversary of the movie, the ongoing series of the comic was to officially start in the Summer of 2004 with three known stories. The following synopses have been collected from the official site:

- Ghostbusters Monthly #1 – In June 1984, GHOSTBUSTERS exploded into theaters and captivated a generation. Twenty years later, the boys are back in a brand new ONGOING comic book series. Now that they've saved the world twice, the Ghostbusters want to go global...but that's easier said than done. Meanwhile, a dead man is wandering the streets of New York and something wicked stirs in the Central Park Zoo. Old foes, new enemies and trusty unlicensed nuclear accelerators, this exciting first issue has it all. Because even after two decades, you know who to call.
- Ghostbusters Monthly #2 – Romance is in the air as Egon and Janine go out on their first official date, and with Peter playing the role of Cyrano things are bound to get interesting. Meanwhile, Winston goes solo, Louis gets an unwelcome visit from an old friend, and Ray takes a trip to a dark, dangerous place...the library.
- Ghostbusters Monthly #3 – With the powerful ghost known as Ahriman making trouble and Vinz Clortho back for an encore, the Ghostbusters find themselves racing from one disaster to the next. And that's before things get really bad. It turns out there's one thing worse than having two evil spirits rampaging through New York; when they get together.

Due to the varying problems with finance and publishing, Sebastien Clavet announced that the ongoing Ghostbusters series would be going into indefinite hiatus with three issues planned and three covers released.

=== Collected edition ===
In early 2005 Sebastien Clavet announced the official trade collection of the series which would include a coloured version of The Zeddemore Factor one shot, concept art, 'Ecto-Logs', a foreword by Ghostbusters creator Dan Aykroyd and a proposed afterword by an as yet unknown actor related to the film. The cut-off date for pre-orders was extended several times, while a firm release date had never been announced. This trade would have been a hardcover collection that was supposed to be released via a Diamond Comic Distributors "Previews" exclusive.

However, it would appear that financial problems have plagued this venture despite hundreds of paid pre-orders. Clavet has since closed his own company's message boards and removed contact information from 88MPH Studios website, leaving many disgruntled fans to level claims of fraud against Clavet. A post made on January 14, 2007, on the new 88MPH Studios website states that pre-orders placed with them and Graham crackers are guaranteed and that more information will be posted shortly. Posts entered onto the Weaver Hall forum on January 17 reference Clavet's intent to offer the hardcover to fans via the 88MPH Studios online store. But this never came to fruition.

Presently, a version of the Legion Trade in Soft Cover has been released for commercial purchase. It reprints all 4 regular issues and a colorized version of The Zeddemore Factor; however, it lacks the foreword by Aykroyd and the concept art. The book is available in the United Kingdom and was published by Titan Books.

== Tokyopop ==
Tokyopop published a one-shot black and white Manga comic in 2008 called Ghostbusters: Ghost Busted. The comic comprised six mini-stories.

== IDW Publishing ==
Cover to Ghostbusters #2. Art by Nick Runge.

IDW Publishing obtained the comic books rights to the Ghostbusters in 2008 and began publishing a series of one shots and miniseries based on the property. IDW then announced plans to publish an ongoing series starting in September 2011.

=== One shots and mini-series ===
- Ghostbusters: The Other Side

A 4-issue miniseries that ran from October 2008 to January 2009. It was written by Keith C. Champagne with artwork by Tom Nguyen. It was collected as a trade paperback in May 2009.

- Ghostbusters: Displaced Aggression

Another 4-issue miniseries that ran from September 2009 to December 2009. It was written by Scott Lobdell and illustrated by Llias Kyriazis. It was then collected as a trade paperback in April 2010, and spawned a Hundred Penny Press edition in 2011.

- Ghostbusters: Past, Present, and Future

A one-shot that was published in December 2009. It was written by Rob Williams with artwork by Diego Jourdan Pereira.

- Ghostbusters: Tainted Love

A one-shot published in February 2010. Written by Dara Naraghi with artwork by Salgood Sam.

- Ghostbusters: Con-Volution

A one-shot published in June 2010. It was written by Jim Beard and Keith Dallas and featured artwork by Josh Howard.

- Ghostbusters: What in Samhain Just Happened?!

A one shot published in October 2010. It was written by Peter Allen David with artwork by Dan Schoening.

- Ghostbusters: Haunted Holidays

A tradepaperback published in November 2010 that collects the various one-shots. These include Past, Present, and Future, Tainted Love, Con-Volution and What in Samhain Just Happened?!. It also includes a brand new bonus story called Guess What's Coming to Dinner?.

- Ghostbusters Omnibus

Released in September 2012, this omnibus contained collections of various one shots and mini-series. Includes the following; The Other Side, Displaced Aggression, Tainted Love, Con-Volution, What in Samhain Just Happened?!, Guess What's Coming to Dinner?, and Past, Present, and Future.

- Ghostbusters: 100-Page Spooktacular

In October 2012 to coincide with Halloween, IDW released this one shot which collects various issues.

- Ghostbusters Times Scare!

A one-shot reprint published in October 2012 for the Halloween Comic Fest.

- Infestation

A 2-issue miniseries published from January to April 2011. It was preceded by an ashcan edition called Classified Secrets of Infestation that was published in November 2010. It also featured a sketchbook that was published in January 2011. This miniseries formed the framing device of a large zombie-themed crossover storyline event that featured several of the IDW-licensed properties such as G.I. Joe, Star Trek, Transformers and of course Ghostbusters. The entire series was collected as a hardcover in December 2011.

- Ghostbusters: Infestation

A 2-issue miniseries published from March 9–23, 2011, as part of the Infestation storyline. It was written by Erik Burnham with artwork by Kyle Hotz.

- Mars Attacks the Real Ghostbusters

A one-shot comic published in January 2013, written by Erik Burnham with art by Jose Holder, featuring a crossover between the cartoon versions of the Ghostbusters and Mars Attacks. Variant covers of this issue featured the Martians battling Chew and Madman. This issue was reprinted in the one shot Mars Attacks IDW trade that April.

- The X-Files Conspiracy

This one-shot written by Erik Burnham with art by Salvador Navarro (published January 2014), was issue #2 of a six-issue series combining several of the IDW licenses with The X-Files property. This particular issue spotlighted the Ghostbusters.

- Teenage Mutant Ninja Turtles/Ghostbusters

This 4-issue miniseries by Erik Burnham, Tom Waltz, Dan Schoening, and Luis Antonio Delgado (published between October 2014 and January 2015) has the team having an in-continuity crossover/teamup with the Teenage Mutant Ninja Turtles. The miniseries was collected in a single volume in April 2015, and a special "Director's Cut" version of issue #1 featuring bonus materials and creator commentary was released.

- 2015 Ghostbusters: Annual

In November 2015, IDW published a Ghostbusters annual one shot in prestige format. This annual featured multiple short stories involving the various characters in the Ghostbusters universe. It was reprinted in the Ghostbusters: Interdimensional Cross-Rip hardcover in September 2017.

- Ghostbusters: Get Real

A 4-issue miniseries published from June through September 2015 featuring a crossover between the established Ghostbusters and the cartoon counterparts from The Real Ghostbusters. The series was collected as a trade paperback in December and again as part of the Ghostbusters: Interdimensional Cross-Rip hardcover in September 2017.

- Ghostbusters: Deviations

In March 2016, IDW published a bunch of one shots called "Deviations". These one-shots explored established story lines from their licensed properties that had an alternate outcome much in the vein of Marvel's What-If comics. In this issue it focuses on what happens had the Ghostbusters not crossed the streams to defeat Gozer at the end of the 1984 film. The entire series was collected as a trade paperback in July 2016 as Deviations: In A World Where Everything Changed.

- 2017 Ghostbusters: Annual

In February 2017, IDW published a Ghostbusters annual one shot in prestige format. This annual featured multiple short stories involving the various characters in the Ghostbusters universe.

- Ghostbusters: 101

From March through August 2017, IDW published this 6 issue series which featured a crossover between the 1984 team and the 2016 team. The series was collected as a trade paperback in December called Ghostbusters 101: Everyone Answers The Call.

- Ghostbusters: Funko Universe

A one-shot published in May 2017 that featured Funko versions of the characters. This one shot was reprinted in the Funko Universe trade paperback in September.

- Ghostbusters: Dia De Los Muertos HCF17 Edition

A one-shot reprint published in October 2017 for the Halloween Comic Fest.

- Ghostbusters: Answer The Call

A 5-issue series beginning in October 2017, based on the 2016 team. The series was collected as a trade paperback in June 2018.

- Teenage Mutant Ninja Turtles/Ghostbusters 2

In November 2017, IDW published a weekly 5 issue series as a sequel to the 2014 series once again featuring the talents of Erik Burnham, Tom Waltz and Dan Schoening. The series was collected as a trade paperback in March 2018.

- 2018 Ghostbusters: Annual

In February 2018, IDW published a Ghostbusters annual one shot in prestige format. This annual featured multiple short stories involving the various characters in the Ghostbusters universe.

- Ghostbusters Crossing Over

In April 2018, IDW began publishing an 8 issue miniseries featuring all the various Ghostbusters teams crossing over in an epic event. These include the original team, the Answer the Call Ghostbusters, The Real Ghostbusters, the Extreme Ghostbusters, and the Sanctum of Slime Ghostbusters. The series was collected (along with the 2018 annual) as a trade paperback in January 2019.

- Ghostbusters 20/20

A one-shot set 20 years in the future was published in January 2019, spotlighting the young Ghostbusters team from Ghostbusters: Sanctum of Slime.

- Ghostbusters 35th Anniversary

4 weekly one-shots published throughout April 2019 spotlighting different Ghostbusters teams. The original team, the Real Ghostbusters, the Answer the Call Ghostbusters and the Extreme Ghostbusters. The four issue series was collected as a trade in October 2019 called Ghostbusters: 35th Anniversary Collection.

- Transformers/Ghostbusters: Ghosts of Cybertron

A five-issue miniseries was published beginning in June 2019, again written by Erik Burnham with art by Dan Schoening and Luis Antonio Delgado. The miniseries is a crossover between the Ghostbusters and Transformers franchises in celebration of their shared 35th anniversary, and features a new Transformer named Ectotron, an Autobot who transforms into the Ecto-1. The series was collected as a trade in February 2020.

- Ghostbusters: Year One

A four-issue miniseries that was published from January to April 2020. The miniseries features stories about the team shortly after the events of the first film.

=== Ongoing series ===
From September 2011 through December 2012, IDW published an ongoing series that ran 16 issues, written by Erik Burnham with art by Dan Schoening and Luis Antonio Delgado. In March 2014, the entire series was collected as a hardcover collection called Ghostbusters: Total Containment. The first 12 issues were published as a trade paperback called Ghostbusters: Spectral Shenanigans Volume 1 in November 2018, with the rest in Volume 2 in November 2019.

From February 2013 through September 2014, after a hiatus for the "Mars Attacks Real Ghostbusters" one shot, IDW published a new ongoing series at first titled The New Ghostbusters. The series, also by Burnham, Schoening, and Delgado, ran 20 issues. In July 2015, the entire series was collected as a hardcover collection called Ghostbusters: Mass Hysteria. An annual was published in November 2015. In March 2012, IDW began reprinting both series as a 9 volume trade paperback collection. In June 2016, the first issue was reprinted as a $1 comic called The New Ghostbusters #1 IDW’s Greatest Hits Edition The first 8 issues of the series was reprinted in Ghostbusters: Spectral Shenanigans Volume 2 in November 2019.

From January through November 2016, IDW published a new ongoing series called Ghostbusters: International which takes the team to different International locales and out of the United States. They reprinted the series as a two volume trade in June 2016, and again as part of the Ghostbusters: Interdimensional Cross-Rip hardcover in September 2017.

== Dark Horse Comics ==
Dark Horse Comics published Ghostbusters: Back in Town from March through June 2024. They published Ghostbusters: Dead Man's Chest from May through September 2025.

=== One shots and mini-series ===
- Ghostbusters: Back in Town

A 4-issue miniseries that takes between Ghostbusters: Afterlife and Ghostbusters: Frozen Empire was published from March through June 2024.

- Ghostbusters: Dead Man's Chest

Originally solicited under the title Ghostbusters: Skeleton Crew; A 4-issue miniseries that takes place after Ghostbusters: Frozen Empire that was published from May through September 2025.
