= Prism Comics =

Non-profit organization

- Founded: April 2003
- Region served: United States
- Product: Prism Comics: Your LGBT Guide to Comics

Prism Comics is a 501(c)(3) non-profit organization that promotes awareness of lesbian, gay, bisexual, and transgender (LGBT) creators, stories, characters, and readers in the comics industry. It does this through informational booths and programming at comic conventions, print and online guides to LGBT creators and comics, and the annual Queer Press Grant to assist publication of new LGBT-themed work.

Prism Comics incorporated in April 2003 in the state of Georgia, and received its 501(c)(3) charitable status shortly thereafter. The organization was initially composed of a small number of comics fans and professionals from across the United States who had volunteered on an annual publication called Out in Comics, which was a listing of LGBT creators in comics that ran for three issues. Following incorporation, it expanded activities, publishing feature articles, interviews, original, art and content; expanding convention appearances and programming; and (until late 2014) a web forum.

== Points of interest ==
- Maintains a comprehensive website, PrismComics.org, that posts LGBT-related comics news, reviews, and profiles of nearly 300 LGBT comics professionals.
- Produces weekly articles featured on the Prism website.
- Works with comics convention organizers to include LGBT content in their programming schedules, helping them to procure panelists, and promoting the panels in fan venues and in the LGBT and comics media.
- Purchases booth space at major comics conventions each year as an outreach effort to the industry to promote the work of LGBT creators in comics who are not having their work promoted sufficiently elsewhere.

== Queer Press Grant ==
Prism awards one-time financial grants to comics creators who are self-publishing a work of interest to an LGBT audience. In 2005 and 2006, the value of the grant was $1000, in 2007 it was raised to $1500, and later to $2000. The grant is announced annually at Wondercon comic convention in Anaheim, California. In 2020, the Prism Awards was held virtually as a two-day livestream.

Recipients are:

- 2005: Steve MacIsaac for Shirtlifter
- 2006: Megan Rose Gedris for YU+ME:dream
- 2007: Justin Hall for A Sacred Text, True Travel Tales, Hard to Swallow
- 2007: Tommy Roddy for Pride High
- 2008: Pam Harrison for House of Muses
- 2009: Ed Luce for Wuvable Oaf
- 2009: Eric Orner for Storybox
- 2010: Jon Macy for Fearful Hunter
- 2010: Tana Ford for Duck
- 2011: Robert Kirby for THREE
- 2012: Christine Smith for The Princess
- 2012: Blue Delliquanti for O Human Star
- 2013: Hazel Newlevant for If This Be Sin
- 2014: Calvin Gimpelevich for Wolfmen
- 2015: Dave Davenport for Stray Bullet
- 2016: Elizabeth Beier for Bisexual Trials and Errors
- 2016: Catherine Esguerra for Eighty Days
- 2017: Tee Franklin for Bingo Love
- 2018: Eric Kostiuk Williams

== Prism Awards ==
The Prism Awards were created as a joint venture between Prism Comics, the Cartoon Art Museum, and the Queer Comics Expo, given to LGBTQ comic creators. A category for Young Readers was added in 2021. The latest awards were given out in 2021.

=== Best Short Form Comic ===
Best Short Form Comic
Year	Work	Author	Ref
2017	Nothing Wrong With Me	Dylan Edwards, originally published on The Nib	
2017	Flux	E Jackson	
2017	Liar	Hari Conner	
2017	The Kiss of the Demoness	Gillian Pascasio	
2018	To Measure	Noella Whitney	
2018	Contact High	James F Wright and Josh Eckert	
2018	Figurinha	Dante Luiz	
2018	There’s More Than One!	Justin Hubbell	
2018	It Was 1973, and Tiffany Banks Was Totally Winning at Gender	Ajuan Mance	
2019	see me	E Jackson	
2019	You Don’t Have to Be Afraid of Me	Victor Martins	
2019	Fazenda De Sangue Azul	H. Pueyo and Dante Luiz	
2020	One Day Out	Ina Bestari	
2020	In Search of Absent Pigments	Alex Assan and Lin Darrow	
2020	Pseudo Slut Transmission	Emma Jayne	
2021	God Sees Me Crying in the Bathroom Stall	Vincy Lim	
2021	QAT Person Number 3	Dylan Edwards	
2021	The Unfading Flower	Hari Conner	

=== Best Webcomic ===
Best Webcomic
Year	Work	Author	Ref
2017	Villainette	Scout Tran-Caffe	
2017	With Great Abandon	EH MacMillian	
2017	Failing Sky: Ghost Story	Scout Tran-Caffee	
2018	O Human Star	Blue Delliquanti	
2018	Cans of Beans, chapter 9	Tamara Go	
2018	SuperButch Issue 1	Becky Hawkins and Barry Deutsch	
2018	Monster Pop!	Maya Kern	
2018	Superpose	Ciaran and Anka C	
2019	SuperButch	Becky Hawkins and Barry Deutsch	
2019	After the Fog	H-P Lehkonen	
2019	Null Point	Amara Sherm	
2020	Magical Boy	The Kao	
2020	The Girl that Can’t Get a Girlfriend	Mieri Hiranishi	
2020	Cafe Suada	Jade Sarson	
2021	Superpose	Seosamh and Anka	
2021	Shaderunners	Alex Assan and Lin Darrow	
2021	A Guide To A Healthy Relationship	Copper	

=== Best Comic from a Small to Midsize Press ===
Best Comic from a Small to Midsize Press
Year	Work	Author	Ref
2017	Short Gay Stories	H-P Lehkonen	
2017	Destiny, NY Volume One: Who I Used to Be	Pat Shand (Writer), Manuel Preitano (Artist), Jim Campbell (Letterer), and Shannon Lee (Editor)	
2017	Active Voice The Comic Collection	P. Kristen Enos (writer), Heidi Ho (contributing writer), Casandra Grullon (artist), Derek Chua (artist), Leesamarie Croal (artist), Beth Varni (artist), and Dan Parent (cover art)	
2018	The Boys Who Became Hummingbirds	Daniel Heath Justice and Weshoyot Alvitre	
2018	Steam Clean	Laura Ķeniņš	
2018	My Favorite Thing Is Monsters	Emil Ferris	
2019	Meal	Blue Delliquanti and Soleil Ho	
2019	The Lie and How We Told It	Tommy Parish	
2019	It Will Be Hard	Hien Pham	
2020	Trans Girls Hit The Town	Emma Jayne	
2020	Lemonade Summer	Gabi Mendez	
2020	Stage Dreams	Melanie Gillman	
2021	To Cut	Noella Whitne	
2021	Sasha From The Gym	Otava Heikkilä	
2021	How To Be Ace: A Memoir of Growing Up Asexual	Rebecca Burgess	

=== Best Comic from a Mainstream Publisher ===
Best Comic from a Mainstream Publisher
Year	Work	Author	Ref
2017	The Backstagers #1	James Tynion IV (writer), and Rian Sygh (artist),	
2017	Supergirl: Being Super #1	Mariko Tamaki (writer), Joëlle Jones (pencils), Sandu Florea (inks), Kelly Fitzpatrick (colorist), Saida Temofonte (letters), Jones and Fitzpatrick (cover art),	
2017	Lumberjanes #17	ND Stevenson (writer), Shannon Watters (writer), and Gus Allen (artist)	
2018	The Witch Boy	Lee Knox Ostertag	
2018	Iceman	Sina Grace (writer), Alessandro Vitti (artist), Kevin Wada (artist)	
2018	Heavy Vinyl	Carly Usdin (Writer), Nina Vakueva (Pencils), Irene Flores (Inker), Rebecca Nalty (Colorist), Jim Campbell (Letterer)	
2019	Lumberjanes: The Infernal Compass	Lilah Sturges, polterink, and Jim Campbell	
2019	Runaways #12	Rainbow Rowell, Kris Anka, Matthew Wilson, and Joe Carmagna	
2019	Exit Stage Left: The Snagglepuss Chronicles #6	Mark Russel, Brandee Stilwell, Paul Mounts, Jeremy Lawson, Rose Campbell, Ben Caldwell, Mike Morales, Gus Vazquez, Sean Parsons, and Mike Feehand	
2020	Laura Dean Keeps Breaking Up With Me	Mariko Tamaki and Rosemary Valero-O’Connell	
2020	Bloom	Kevin Panetta and Savanna Ganucheau	
2020	Kiss Number 8	Colleen AF Venable and Ellen T. Crenshaw	
2021	The Low Low Woods	Carmen Maria Machado (writer), Joe Hill (writer), Dan McDaid (artist) and Dani Strips (artist)	
2021	Juliet Takes a Breath	Gabby Rivera (writer) and Celia Moscote (artist)	
2021	The Deep & Dark Blue	Niki Smith	

=== Best Comic Anthology ===
Best Comic Anthology
Year	Work	Editor	Ref
2017	POWER & MAGIC:The Queer Witch Comics Anthology	Joamette Gil	
2017	Beyond: The Queer Sci-Fi & Fantasy Comic Anthology	Sfé R. Monster and Taneka Stotts	
2017	Food Porn	Gina Biggs	
2017	Chainmail Bikini: The Anthology of Women Gamers	Hazel Newlevant	
2018	Dates: An Anthology of Queer Historical Fiction Volume 2	Zora Gilbert and Cat Parra	
2018	Power & Magic: IMMORTAL SOULS	Joamette Gil	
2018	Oh Joy Sex Toy, Volume 4	Erika Moen and Matthew Nolan	
2019	ABO Comix Vol. 2: A Comic Anthology by LGBTQ Prisoners	Casper Cendre	
2019	Being True: LGBTQ+ Comics From The Boston Comics Roundtable	Renie Jesanis, Kyri Lorenz, and Steph Rose Glass	
2019	Group Chat	Carolynn Calabrese, Jenny Mott, Ashley Gallagher, and Rachel Weiss	
2020	Heartwood	Joamette Gil	
2020	Come Together	Tab Kimpton and Alex Assan	
2020	Shout Out	Steven Andrews	
2021	A.B.O. Comix: A Queer Prisoners Anthology Vol 4	Casper Cendre	
2021	Ambrosia: Trans Masc & Non Binary Erotic Comics	Tab Kimpton and Jade Sarson	
2021	Confined Before COVID19: A Pandemic Anthology by LGBTQ Prisoners	Casper Cendre	

=== Young Readers ===
Young Readers
Year	Work	Editor	Ref
2021	The Deep & Dark Blue	Niki Smith	
2021	The Magic Fish	Trung Le Nguyen	
2021	Space Battle Lunchtime Vol. 3: A Dish Best Served Cold	Natalie Riess	
