= Speak up =

Speak up or Speak Up may refer to:

== Technology ==
- Speakup, the screen reader

== Entertainment ==
- Speak Up! It's So Dark, a Swedish drama film
- "Speak Up" (Pop Etc song), a song by Pop Etc
- "Speak Up, Francine!", an episode of the TV series Arthur
- Speak Up!, graphic novel

== Other uses ==
- Speak Up, a campaign and national hotline from The Center to Prevent Youth Violence
- Speak Up, a feminist initiative encouraging women to speak out about harassment, founded by Gehad Hamdy
