= The Comics Interpreter =

- Editor: Robert Young
- Categories: comics, criticism, interviews
- Frequency: Infrequently
- Publisher: Abscess Press
- First issue: 1999
- Final issue: 2004
- Country: United States
- Based in: Hanahan, South Carolina
- Language: English
- Website: thecomicsinterpreter.blogspot.com

The Comics Interpreter (TCI) was a zine of comics criticism, published and edited by Robert Young. Published from 1999 to 2004, it focused on alternative comics, and was characterized by interviews and reviews of greater length and detail than most comics-oriented publications (resembling the long-running The Comics Journal in that regard). Although The Comics Interpreter generally had low production values, well-known artists contributed cover art.

In addition to editor Young, notable prose contributors to TCI included former Comics Journal stalwart Gene Phillips, Chad Parenteau, David Choe, Nick Abadzis, and Mark Staff Brandl (who wrote a "theoretical article").

== Overview ==
Early issues featured interviews with seminal indy comics creators including brothers Asaf & Tomer Hanuka, Brian Ralph, Jordan Crane, Jesse Reklaw, David Choe, and even a brief chat with Neil Gaiman. There were lengthy reviews of Frank Miller's 300, the work of Alex Ross, and the first reviews of works by Kurt Wolfgang, Kevin Huizenga, and Martin Cendreda.

In 2000, publisher Young released TCI Interview, a collection of interviews from earlier issues with the creators Jordan Crane, David Choe, Jesse Reklaw, and Jef Czekaj.

With issue #6, Dec. 2001, the magazine went to offset printing. Following that issue TCI re-emerged after a long layover with TCI volume 2, #1, featuring a cover by underground cartoonist Hans Rickheit and an interview with iconoclastic artist Paul Pope. Subsequent issues demonstrated the magazine's eclectic interests, with essays from Gene Phillips, reviews of works ranging from Alan Moore to obscure minicomics by Jamie Tanner and Dave Shelton, and interviews with George Pratt, Kozyndan, James Jean, David Rees, Alex Maleev, and Tak Toyoshima.

In the mid-2000s TCI also had a podcast.

== Issues ==
=== Volume 1 ===
- Vol. 1, #1 (Winter 1999) — interview with Neil Gaiman; review of Frank Miller's 300.
- Vol. 1, #2 (c. 2000)
- Vol. 1, #3 (2000) — interviews with Jesse Reklaw and Jordan Crane; Nick Abadzis sketchbook
- Vol. 1, #4 (Winter 2001) — interviews with David Choe and Ted Rall. Cover art by David Choe.
- Vol. 1, #5 (2001) — interviews with Brian Ralph, and Tomer & Asaf Hanuka. Discussion of the comics of Hans Rickheit. Cover art by Tomer Hanuka.
- Vol. 1, #6 (Dec. 2001) — tribute to The Hernandez brothers, complete with interviews of Jaime Hernandez and brother Gilbert Hernandez and commentary from sources as wide-ranging as Nick Abadzis, David Choe, Andi Watson, and then-Marvel Publisher Joe Quesada. Also features an interview with British scribe Jamie Delano focusing on his work with Frank Quitely on 20/20 Visions. Cover art by Nick Abadzis.

=== Volume 2 ===
- Vol. 2, #1 (2003) — interviews with Paul Pope and Glenn Fabry. Creators cast their votes for "Comics' Most Interesting Person(ality)." Also: in-depth reviews of a wide range of comics and minicomics. Cover art by Hans Rickheit.
- Vol. 2, #2 (2004) — interviews with George Pratt, Alex Maleev, and Kozyndan. Discussions about Stan Lee. Comics/minicomics reviews. Cover art by Kozyndan.
- Vol. 2, #3 (Nov. 2004) — interviews with James Jean, Teddy Kristiansen, David Rees, and Tak Toyoshima. A new comics story from Hans Rickheit. A discussion of Alan Moore's Big Numbers. Cover art by James Jean.
