= Lambda Literary Award for LGBTQ+ Romance & Erotica =

Literary award

- Awarded for: LGBT Erotica
- Sponsored by: Lambda Literary Foundation
- Date: Annual

The Lambda Literary Award for LGBTQ+ Romance & Erotica is an annual literary award established in 2002 and presented by the Lambda Literary Foundation that awards books with LGBTQ+ characters and "whose content is principally of an erotic nature." "Anthologies, novels, novellas, graphic novels, memoirs, and short story collections" are eligible for the award.

The award has been presented in the following categories: Gay Erotica, Lesbian Erotica, and LGBTQ+ Erotica.

== Recipients ==
Lambda Literary Award for Erotica winners and finalists
Year	Category	Author(s)	Title	Result	Ref.
2002	Erotica	Ian Philips	See Dick Deconstruct: Literotica for the Satirically Bent	Winner	
2002	Erotica	M. Christian	Dirty Words	Finalist	
2002	Erotica	Lawrence Schimel	His Tongue	Finalist	
2002	Erotica	Karen X. Tulchinsky	Hot & Bothered 3	Finalist	
2002	Erotica	Lori Selke	Tough Girls: Down and Dirty Dyke Erotica	Finalist	
2003	Erotica	Tristan Taormino (editor)	Best Lesbian Erotica 2003	Winner	
2003	Erotica	Richard Labonte editor)	Best Gay Erotica 2003	Finalist	
2003	Erotica	Leslea Newman (editor)	Bedroom Eyes	Finalist	
2003	Erotica	Bob Vickery	Cocksure	Finalist	
2003	Erotica	Stephen Greco	The Sperm Engine	Finalist	
2004	Erotica	Tristan Taormino (editor)	Best Lesbian Erotica 2004	Winner	
2004	Erotica	Richard Labonte (editor)	Best Gay Erotica 2004	Finalist	
2004	Erotica	Karen X. Tulchinsky (editor)	Hot and Bothered 4	Finalist	
2004	Erotica	Michael Thomas Ford, William J. Mann, Sean Wolfe, and Jeff Mann	Masters of Midnight	Finalist	
2004	Erotica	James Johnstone (editor)	Quickies 3	Finalist	
2005	Erotica	Richard Labonte (editor)	Best Gay Erotica 2005	Winner	
2005	Erotica	Karin Kallmaker	All the Wrong Places	Finalist	
2005	Erotica	Tristan Taormino (editor)	Best Lesbian Erotica 2005	Finalist	
2005	Erotica	Karin Kallmaker, Therese Syzmanski, Julia Watts, and Barbara Johnson	Once Upon a Dyke	Finalist	
2005	Erotica	Rachel Kramer Bussel Stacy M. Bias	Up All Night: Adventures in Lesbian Sex	Finalist	
2006	Erotica	Stacia Seaman and Radclyffe, (editors)	Stolen Moments: Erotic Interludes 2	Winner	
2006	Erotica	Matt Bernstein Sycamore and Richard Labonté	Best Gay Erotica 2006	Finalist	
2006	Erotica	Eileen Myles and Tristan Taormino	Best Lesbian Erotica 2006	Finalist	
2006	Erotica	Sacchi Green and Rakelle Valencia	Rode Hard But Away Wet: Lesbian Cowboy Erotica	Finalist	
2006	Erotica	Sean Wolfe	Close Contact	Finalist	
2007	Gay Erotica	Jeff Mann	A History of Barbed Wire	Winner	
2007	Gay Erotica	Richard Labonte Timothy J. Lambert (editors)	Best Gay Erotica 2007	Finalist	
2007	Gay Erotica	Zavo	Hot On His Trail	Finalist	
2007	Lesbian Erotica	Laurinda D. Brown	Walk Like a Man	Winner	
2007	Lesbian Erotica	Karin Kallmaker	18th & Castro	Finalist	
2007	Lesbian Erotica	Tristan Taormino Emma Donoghue (editors)	Best Lesbian Erotica 2007	Finalist	
2007	Lesbian Erotica	Rachel Kramer Bussel (editor)	Glamour Girls	Finalist	
2007	Lesbian Erotica	Midori	Master Han's Daughter	Finalist	
2008	Erotica	Simon Sheppard	Homosex: 60 Years of Gay Erotica	Winner	
2008	Erotica	William Maltese Wayne Gunn	Ardennian Boy	Finalist	
2008	Erotica	Fiona Zedde	Every Dark Desire	Finalist	
2008	Erotica	J. D. Glass	Red Light	Finalist	
2008	Erotica	Victoria Brownworth and Judith M. Redding	The Golden Age of Lesbian Erotica	Finalist	
2008	Erotica	Lawrence Schimel	The Mammoth Book of New Gay Erotica	Finalist	
2009	Gay Erotica	Richard Labonte James Lear	Best Gay Erotica 2009	Winner	
2009	Gay Erotica	William Maltese, Victor J. Banis, Jardonn Smith, and J.P. Bowie	Hard Working Men	Finalist	
2009	Gay Erotica	James Lear	The Secret Tunnel	Finalist	
2009	Lesbian Erotica	Radclyffe and Karin Kallmaker	In Deep Waters 2: Cruising the Strip	Winner	
2009	Lesbian Erotica	Sacchi Green and Rakelle Valencia	Lipstick on Her Collar	Finalist	
2009	Lesbian Erotica	Lynne Jamneck	Periphery: Erotic Lesbian Futures	Finalist	
2010	Gay Erotica	Kevin Killian	Impossible Princess	Winner	
2010	Gay Erotica	Sean Wolfe	Eight Inches	Finalist	
2010	Gay Erotica	Richard Labonté and Lawrence Schimel (editors)	I Like It Like That: True Tales of Gay Desire	Finalist	
2010	Gay Erotica	Todd Gregory (editor)	Rough Trade: Dangerous Gay Erotica	Finalist	
2010	Gay Erotica	James Lear	The Low Road	Finalist	
2010	Lesbian Erotica	Sacchi Green and Rakelle Valencia (editors)	Lesbian Cowboys	Winner	
2010	Lesbian Erotica	Ronica Black	Flesh and Bone	Finalist	
2010	Lesbian Erotica	Diane Anderson-Minshall	Punishment with Kisses	Finalist	
2010	Lesbian Erotica	D.L. King	Where the Girls Are	Finalist	
2010	Lesbian Erotica	Cecilia Tan (editor)	Women of the Bite	Finalist	
2011	Gay Erotica	Jon Macy	Teleny and Camille	Winner	
2011	Gay Erotica	William Holden	A Twist of Grimm: Erotic Fairy Tales for Gay Men	Finalist	
2011	Gay Erotica	Richard Labonté (editor)	Best of the Best Gay Erotica 3	Finalist	
2011	Gay Erotica	Jerry Wheeler (editor)	Tented: Gay Erotic Tales from Under the Big Top	Finalist	
2011	Gay Erotica	Hank Edwards	Vancouver Nights	Finalist	
2011	Lesbian Erotica	Tristan Taormino (editor)	Sometimes She Lets Me: Best Butch/Femme Erotica	Winner	
2011	Lesbian Erotica	Kathleen Warnock (editor); Lea DeLaria (introduction)	Best Lesbian Erotica 2011	Finalist	
2011	Lesbian Erotica	D Alexandria	This Is How We Do It: A Raw Mix of Lesbian Erotica	Finalist	
2012	Gay Erotica	Dirk Vanden	All Together	Winner	
2012	Gay Erotica	Natty Soltesz	Backwoods	Finalist	
2012	Gay Erotica	Richard Labonte (editor)	Best Gay Erotica 2012	Finalist	
2012	Gay Erotica	Steven Haas (editor)	Gay Erotica	Finalist	
2012	Gay Erotica	Richard Labonte (editor)	History's Passions: Stories of Sex Before Stonewall	Finalist	
2012	Lesbian Erotica	Debra Hyde	Story of L	Winner	
2012	Lesbian Erotica	Sacchi Green	A Ride to Remember & Other Erotic Tales	Finalist	
2012	Lesbian Erotica	Sacchi Green (editor)	Lesbian Cops: Erotic Investigations	Finalist	
2012	Lesbian Erotica	Lesley Gowan	The Collectors	Finalist	
2013	Gay Erotica	Mykola Dementiuk	The Facialist	Winner	
2013	Gay Erotica	Lukas Hand	Coming To: A Collection of Erotic and Other Epiphanies	Finalist	
2013	Gay Erotica	Jerry L. Wheele	Strawberries and Other Erotic Fruits	Finalist	
2013	Gay Erotica	Todd Gregory (editor)	Raising Hell: Demonic Gay Erotica	Finalist	
2013	Gay Erotica	William Holden	Secret Societies	Finalist	
2013	Lesbian Erotica	D.L. King	The Harder She Comes: Butch/Femme Erotica	Winner	
2013	Lesbian Erotica	Ily Goyanes (editor)	Girls Who Score: Hot Lesbian Erotica	Finalist	
2013	Lesbian Erotica	Catt Kingsgrave	One Saved to the Sea	Finalist	
2014	Gay Erotica	Alex Jeffers	The Padisah's Son and the Fox: an erotic novella	Winner	
2014	Gay Erotica	Aleksandr Voinov L.A. Witt	Capture & Surrender	Finalist	
2014	Gay Erotica	Michael Luongo (editor)	Sensual Travels: Gay Erotic Stories	Finalist	
2014	Gay Erotica	Richard Labonte (editor)	Show-Offs: Gay Erotic Stories	Finalist	
2014	Gay Erotica	Winston Gieseke (editor)	Team Players: Gay Erotic Stories	Finalist	
2014	Lesbian Erotica	Sacchi Green (editor)	Wild Girls Wild Nights: True Lesbian Sex Stories	Winner	
2014	Lesbian Erotica	Rebekah Weatherspoon	At Her Feet	Finalist	
2014	Lesbian Erotica	Kathleen Warnock (editor)	Best Lesbian Erotica 2014	Finalist	
2015	Gay Erotica	Tiffany Reisz	The King	Winner	
2015	Gay Erotica	Hushicho	Incubus Tales	Finalist	
2015	Gay Erotica	Raven Kaldera	Leather Spirit Stallion	Finalist	
2015	Gay Erotica	Jerry Wheeler	The Bears of Winter	Finalist	
2015	Gay Erotica	William Holden	The Thief Taker	Finalist	
2015	Lesbian Erotica	Diana Cage	Lesbian Sex Bible	Winner	
2015	Lesbian Erotica	Andi Marquette R.G. Emanuelle	All You Can Eat. A Buffet of Lesbian Erotica and Romance	Finalist	
2015	Lesbian Erotica	Cheyenne Blue	Forbidden Fruit: stories of unwise lesbian desire	Finalist	
2016	Gay Erotica	Miodrag Kojadinovic	Érotiques Suprèmes	Winner	
2016	Gay Erotica	Jennifer Levine Rian Darcy	Charming: Modern Gay Fairytales	Finalist	
2016	Gay Erotica	Natty Soltesz	College Dive Bar, 1 AM	Finalist	
2016	Gay Erotica	William Holden	Grave Desires	Finalist	
2016	Gay Erotica	Michael Ampersant	Green Eyes — an erotic novel (sort-of)	Finalist	
2016	Lesbian Erotica	Meghan O'Brien	The Muse	Winner	
2016	Lesbian Erotica	Salome Wilde Talon Rihai (editors)	Desire Behind Bars: Lesbian Prison Erotica	Finalist	
2016	Lesbian Erotica	Sinclair Sexsmith	Sweet & Rough: Queer Kink Erotica	Finalist	
2017	Erotica	Rebekah Weatherspoon	Soul to Keep	Winner	
2017	Erotica	Meghan O'Brien	Camp Rewind	Finalist	
2017	Erotica	Marie Sexton L.A. Witt	Roped In	Finalist	
2017	Erotica	Scott Alexander Hess	Skyscraper	Finalist	
2017	Erotica	Alexa Black	Steel and Promise	Finalist	
2018	Erotica	Steve Berman	His Seed	Winner	
2018	Erotica	Siri Caldwell	Mistletoe Mishap	Finalist	
2018	Erotica	L.A. Witt	The Master Will Appear	Finalist	
2018	Erotica	D.L. King	Unspeakably Erotic	Finalist	
2018	Erotica	Sacchi Green	Witches, Princesses, and Women at Arms	Finalist	
2019	Erotica	Blue Delliquanti and Kazimir Lee	Miles & Honesty in SCFSX!	Winner	
2019	Erotica	Sacchi Green	Best Lesbian Erotica of the Year, Volume 3	Finalist	
2019	Erotica	Niki Smith	Crossplay	Finalist	
2019	Erotica	Matthew Bright	Gents: Steamy Stories From the Age of Steam	Finalist	
2019	Erotica	Tom Cardamone	The Lurid Sea	Finalist	
2020	Erotica	LA Warman	Whore Foods	Winner	
2020	Erotica	Vikram Kolmannskog	Lord of the Senses	Finalist	
2020	Erotica	Rosalind Chase	Lot's Wife: An Erotic Novella	Finalist	
2020	Erotica	Thomas Kearnes	Texas Crude	Finalist	
2020	Erotica	Gary Garth McCann	The Shape of the Earth	Finalist	
2021	Erotica	Lee Suksi	The Nerves	Winner	
2021	Erotica	Sinclair Sexsmith	Best Lesbian Erotica of the Year, Volume 5	Finalist	
2021	Erotica	Anne Shade	Femme Tales	Finalist	
2021	Erotica	Andrea Purcell	Smut Peddler Presents: Silver	Finalist	
2021	Erotica	Kel Hardy, Tianna Henry, and MJ Lyons	Smut Peddlers: Glad Day 50	Finalist	
2022	LGBTQ Erotica	Samuel R. Delany	Big Joe	Winner	
2022	LGBTQ Erotica	MJ Lyons	Queer Werewolves Destroy Capitalism: Smutty Stories	Finalist	
2022	LGBTQ Erotica	Tab Kimpton and Harry-Anne Bentley (eds.)	Nectar: Trans Femme and Non Binary Erotic Comics Anthology	Finalist	
2022	LGBTQ Erotica	Tab Kimpton and Jade Sarson (eds.)	Ambrosia: Trans Masc and Non Binary Erotic Comics Anthology	Finalist	
2022	LGBTQ Erotica	Levi Huxton	The Lodger, That Summer	Finalist	
2023	LGBTQ Romance and Erotica	Alison Cochrun	Kiss Her Once For Me	Winner	
2023	LGBTQ Romance and Erotica	Ruby Barrett	The Romance Recipe	Finalist	
2023	LGBTQ Romance and Erotica	Meryl Wilsner	Mistakes Were Made	Finalist	
2023	LGBTQ Romance and Erotica	Edie Cay	A Lady's Finder	Finalist	
2023	LGBTQ Romance and Erotica	Joseph Brennan	Loose Lips: A Gay Sea Odyssey	Finalist	
2024	LGBTQ+ Romance and Erotica	laura q	A Tight Squeeze: Smutty Trans and Queer Stories	Winner	
2024	LGBTQ+ Romance and Erotica	TJ Alexander	Chef's Choice	Finalist	
2024	LGBTQ+ Romance and Erotica	Andie Burke	Fly with Me	Finalist	
2024	LGBTQ+ Romance and Erotica	Ashley Herring Blake	Iris Kelly Doesn't Date	Finalist	
2024	LGBTQ+ Romance and Erotica	Alexandria Bellefleur	The Fiancee Farce	Finalist	
2025	LGBTQ+ Romance and Erotica	Fearne Hill	Oyster	Winner	
2025	LGBTQ+ Romance and Erotica	Colin Dereham	Bradford, Bru and Brendan Too	Finalist	
2025	LGBTQ+ Romance and Erotica	Anne Shade	Leather, Lace and Locs	Finalist	
2025	LGBTQ+ Romance and Erotica	Jena Doyle	Midsummer	Finalist	
2025	LGBTQ+ Romance and Erotica	Isla Olsen	Mr. Blue Sky	Finalist	
2026	LGBTQ+ Romance and Erotica	TJ Alexander	A Gentleman's Gentleman	Winner	
2026	LGBTQ+ Romance and Erotica	J. E. Birk	Fanboy in the Falls	Finalist	
2026	LGBTQ+ Romance and Erotica	Adib Khorram	It Had to Be Him	Finalist	
2026	LGBTQ+ Romance and Erotica	Tara Tai	Single Player	Finalist	
2026	LGBTQ+ Romance and Erotica	Aj Writer	Strip Me Down	Finalist	
