= O Human Star =

Science fiction webcomic by Blue Delliquanti

- Official banner on webcomic's website
- Author: Blue Delliquanti
- Website: http://ohumanstar.com/
- Current status/schedule: Completed
- Launch date: 25 January 2012
- End date: 27 August 2020
- Publisher: Self-published
- Genres: Science fiction, LGBT
- Original language: English

O Human Star is a science fiction family drama webcomic by Blue Delliquanti. The title is a reference to a passage in R.U.R., the origin for the word "robot". (Note: "You still stand watch, O human star, burning without a flicker, perfect flame, bright and resourceful spirit. Each of your rays a great idea – O torch which passes from hand to hand, from age to age, world without end.")

== Synopsis ==
O Human Star follows Alastair "Al" Sterling, the person who invented the modern robot. Sixteen years after Al dies, his mind is put into a synthetic replica of his human body. The world now is populated with robots living alongside humans. Al finds his old business partner and lover, Brendan, who has built their company into the world's largest tech company, and meets Sulla, the first humanoid robot, who was made with a copy of Al's mind but has chosen a female body. Al tries to reintegrate into the new world and determine who brought him back and why.

The comic is presented with sections both in the present and the past; the past is illustrated in orange and green, while the present is in blue.

== Author and publication history ==
O Human Star is written and illustrated by Blue Delliquanti. Delliquanti, who is non-binary and is from Minneapolis, previously worked with Soleil Ho on the graphic novel Meal for Iron Circus Comics, and has contributed to Smut Peddler, The Sleep of Reason, and Beyond.

O Human Star began publication in 2012 and concluded in August 2020.

== Themes ==
While the novel does engage with queer and trans issues, robots are not used in a metaphorical way to broach the subjects but rather are incorporated into them. It also deals with the implications of robots and artificial intelligence on our social and economic structures as well as on our concept of personhood, immortality, and identity.

== Reception and legacy ==
=== Critical response ===
Polygon reviewer Samantha Riedel called O Human Star "the best robot comic in a decade", saying that it "delves into complex themes of gender and the need to belong" and calling it "one of the most sociopolitically relevant works of the past ten years". Riedel expanded on the praise, calling it "one of the most unique and imaginative comics of the decade" and an "intimate story" that "[imbues its] characters with life and vigor".

Writing for the DiNKY Awards, DiNKY director Ted Intorcio said "In addition to being a wonderful love story for these men, it challenges the reader’s perceptions of what “normal” looks like... OHS explores LGBTQ issues in a very sensitive way without having this context / subtext overpower the story... Blue's Manga-influenced style is more than competent and complements the tone of the story nicely. I can't recommend this book enough for anyone who likes great stories with rich context and tons of applicability."

Emma Lawson of ComicsAlliance commended the relationships in the comic, particularly Al and Brendan's "gorgeous slow burn" and recommended it to "anyone that dreams of the future".

=== Accolades ===
Year	Category	Institution or publication	Result	Notes	Ref.
2018	Webcomics Category	Prism Awards	Won	For excerpts of O Human Star from 2017	
2016	Best in Show	DiNKY Awards	Won		
2016	Best Work – Self Published	DiNKY Awards	Won		
2016	Outstanding Work – Diversity	DiNKY Awards	Nominated		
2015	Outstanding Online Comic	Ignatz Award	Nominated		
2015	LGBT Graphic Novel	Lambda Literary Award	Nominated		
2014	Favorite Webcomic (Continuing Story)	Autostraddle	Nominated		
2012	Queer Press Grant	Prism Comics	Won		
