= Howard Bender =

American comic book artist

- Born: Howard Nicholas Bender; September 25, 1951 (age 75) Cleveland, Ohio
- Areas: Penciller, Inker, Letterer
- Notable works: Action Comics "Dial H for Hero"

Howard Nicholas Bender (born September 25, 1951) is an American comic book artist best known for his work for DC Comics and Archie Comics.

== Biography ==
Howard Bender was born in Cleveland, Ohio and grew up in the Highland Park neighborhood of Pittsburgh. He attended the Art Students League and was a co-founder of the Pittsburgh Comics Club in 1972. After working in the production department at Marvel Comics as a letterer and artist (1974–1980), he held a similar role at DC Comics (1981–1985). His Marvel work included adding tones to the black-and-white artwork in Marvel UK's Star Wars Weekly series. At DC Comics, Bender drew one-page introduction features in various mystery titles such as Ghosts, Secrets of Haunted House, The Unexpected, and Weird War Tales. He was the artist on the "Dial H for Hero" backup stories published in The New Adventures of Superboy and drew several Superman stories in Action Comics. His work on a Wildfire story in Legion of Super-Heroes vol. 2 #283 (Jan. 1982) was praised by fellow artist Keith Giffen. Bender drew Ghostbusters for First Comics and has worked on various series for Archie Comics. He and writer Craig Boldman created Mr. Fixitt in 1989. Bender collaborated with Jack C. Harris on a Sherlock Holmes comic strip in the 1990s. In addition to comic books, Bender also works as a caricature artist.

== Bibliography ==
AC Comics

- Femforce #7 (1987)

Apple Press

- Blood of Dracula #9 (1989)
- Mr. Fixitt #1–2 (1989–1990)

Archie Comics

- Archie & Friends Double Digest Magazine #12, 30, 33 (2012–2014)
- Archie 1000 Page Comics Jamboree #1 (2013)
- Archie Comics Digest #109, 232, 248, 263 (1991–2015)
- Archie's Funhouse Double Digest #15, 21 (2015–2016)
- Archie's Pals 'n' Gals #212 (1990)
- Archie's Pals 'n' Gals Double Digest Magazine #113, 130 (2007–2009)
- Archie's R/C Racers #2, 4–5 (1989–1990)
- Betty and Veronica Comics Digest Magazine #72 (1995)
- Betty and Veronica Double Digest Magazine #227 (2014)
- Everything's Archie #152 (1990)
- Jughead and Archie Double Digest #6, 12, 15 (2014–2015)
- Jughead with Archie Digest #111 (1992)
- Jughead's Double Digest #54 (1998)
- Life with Archie #284 (1991)
- Mighty Mutanimals #9 (1993)
- World of Archie Double Digest #15, 20, 40–41, 56 (2012–2016)

Comicfix

- The Charlton Arrow #2 (2014)

DC Comics

- Action Comics #557–558, 563–564, 566, 568–570, 572–575 (1984–1986)
- Adventure Comics #490 ("Dial H for Hero"); #497–499, 501–503 (one page each) (1982–1983)
- All-Star Squadron #43 (one page) (1985)
- America vs. the Justice Society #3–4 (1985)
- Ghosts #100–110, 112 (1981–1982)
- House of Mystery #289 (one page) (1981)
- Justice League of America #218 (cover) (1983)
- Legion of Super-Heroes vol. 2 #283, 291, 295, 300 (1982–1983)
- The New Adventures of Superboy #29–49 ("Dial H for Hero" backup stories) (1982–1984)
- The Saga of the Swamp Thing #5 (Phantom Stranger backup story) (1982)
- Secrets of Haunted House #35–36, 39–46 (1981–1982)
- The Unexpected #210–218 (1981–1982)
- Weird War Tales #99, 101 (1981)
- Who's Who in the Legion of Super-Heroes #5–6 (1988)
- Who's Who: The Definitive Directory of the DC Universe #2, 5–7, 11–13, 17, 19–20 (1985–1986)
- Young All-Stars #7 (1987)

First Comics

- Ghostbusters #1–3 (1987)
- Grimjack #25 (1986)

Hamilton Comics

- Dread of Night #1 (1991)
- Maggots #2 (1992)

Heroic Publishing

- Mr. Fixitt vol. 2 #1 (1993)

Marvel Comics

- Crazy Magazine #69 (1980)
- Kid Colt, Outlaw #219 (one page) (1977)
- Micronauts: The New Voyages #17, 19 (1986)
- Peter Porker, the Spectacular Spider-Ham #10 (1986)
- Kickers, Inc. #4 (1987)
- Official Handbook of the Marvel Universe Deluxe Edition #7 (1986)
- Savage Sword of Conan #101 (one page) (1984)
- SilverHawks #6 (1988)
- What The--?! #23 (1992)

Now Comics

- Slimer #8 (1989)

Triad Publications

- The Honeymooners #12 (1989)

Preceded by Curt Swan	Action Comics artist 1984–1986	Succeeded by Kurt Schaffenberger
