= TJ Alexander =

American author

- Education: Emerson College (MA)
- Writing career
- Notable works: Chef's Kiss (2022); Chef's Choice (2023); Second Chances in New Port Stephen (2023); Triple Sec (2024); A Gentlemen's Gentleman (2025); A Lady for All Seasons (2026)
- Notable awards: Lambda Literary Award for LGBTQ+ Romance & Erotica (2026)

TJ Alexander is an American author of queer fiction. They are the author of Chef's Kiss (2022), Chef's Choice (2023), Second Chances in New Port Stephen (2023), Triple Sec (2024), A Gentlemen's Gentleman (2025), and A Lady for All Seasons (2026).

Alexander grew up in Florida, where their parents owned a restaurant. They received a Master of Arts in writing and publishing from Emerson College. As of 2026, Alexander lives with their wife in New York City.

== Chef's Kiss series ==
The Chef's Kiss series consists of two erotic romance novels published by Emily Bestler Books: Chef's Kiss, published in May 2022, and Chef's Choice, published in 2023.

Chef's Kiss centers 28-year-old Simone Larkspur, a rule-follower who has recently landed her dream job as a recipe developer and writer for a major publication. She soon learns from her boss, Pim Gladly, that the organization is losing money, which pushes Simone to develop skills in video, rather than writing. Pim hires a new team to support this new venture, including Chase McDonald and Ray Lyton. Although Ray and Simone have opposite personalities, they have on-screen chemistry, which helps the organization. After Ray comes out as non-binary, they experience discrimination, and Simone must choose between her career and her support for Ray.

Chef's Choice centers Luna O'Shea, a trans woman living in New York City whose circumstances result in an ability to afford rent. To make ends meet, she begins fake dating Jean-Pierre Dominique Gabriel Aubert-Treffle, a trans man who can only receive his transphobic grandfather's inheritance if he prepares signature family dishes on camera in front of millions of people with a girlfriend beside him. Luna takes on the challenge to be Jean-Pierre's girlfriend and learn how to help cook the family dishes.

Both novels were well received by critics. In a starred review, Publishers Weekly praised Chef's Kiss, writing, "Alexander accomplishes a masterful juggling act: the banter is snappy, the chemistry between Simone and Ray sings, the commentary on social media fame is poignant without ever verging on precious, and the exploration of Ray's nonbinary identity within the structure of a romantic comedy hits exactly right". Kirkus Reviews commended the novel for how it "confronts workplace discrimination, internal biases, and issues like transphobia and misgendering with ease". Library Journal included Chef's Kiss on their list of the best romance novels of 2023, and it was a finalist for the 2024 Lambda Literary Award for LGBTQ+ Romance & Erotica.

In a review of Chef's Choice, Publishers Weekly noted that "the plot itself occasionally needs nudging along, but the exploration of the characters' gender identities makes many well-trod romance beats feel fresh". The novel also received a positive review from The New York Times.

== Second Chances in New Port Stephen (2023) ==
Second Chances in New Port Stephen is an erotic romance novel published by Emily Bestler Books in December 2023. The audiobook produced by Simon & Schuster Audio is narrated by Aden Hakimi and Feodor Chin. Second Chances in New Port Stephen centers Eli Ward, a comedy writer whose life has taken a turn for the worse after his television show is cancelled due to scandal. He reluctantly travels to Florida to stay with his parents, where has to face reminders of his childhood in a small town as a trans man, including his ex-boyfriend from high school, Nick Wu, who is recently divorced and has a four-year-old daughter. What starts as a friendship develops into romance, despite Nick initially believing he's straight.

Lindsey Allen, writing for Booklist, called Second Chances in New Port Stephen a "poignant novel about rebuilding your life for the better", describing it as "well-written, engaging, and deeply heartfelt". Publishers Weekly similarly referred to the novel as "playful and sweet". According to Olivia Waite, writing for The New York Times, Second Chances in New Port Stephen "is as low-concept a book as you can get", but found it worth reading because "you enjoy spending time with these people, and you want them to reach for joy when they can. We all should. It's the difference between saving the world and saving one another. The former can feel impossible; the second we can do every day." Kirkus Reviews provided a more critical review, noting that the novel often feels unrealistic and at times heavy-handed, including repeated reminders about being in the "Don't Say Gay" state, "misunderstandings and miscommunication" that feel "contrived", and the fantastic, immediate connection between the characters, despite not seeing each other for over two decades. They particularly disliked "the repeated assertion that both Eli and Nick are hilarious", which they found to be untrue.

== Triple Sec (2024) ==
Triple Sec is an erotic romance novel published by Emily Bestler Books in 2024. The novel focuses on bartender Mel Sorrento, a flirty new customer named Blair "Bebe" Murray, and Bebe's non-binary spouse, artist Kade St. Cloud. After Bebe invites Mel to the couple's apartment, she's informed about a cocktail competition that could help Mel open her own bar. She also learns that Bebe and Kade are polyamorous, with Bebe interested in dating Mel with Kade's consent. The trio learns more about each other, each developing their own relationships, while Mel expands her cocktail skills.

The New York Public Library named Triple Sec one of the best adult romance novels of 2024.

== A Gentlemen's Gentleman (2025) ==
A Gentlemen's Gentleman is an erotic historical romance novel published by Vintage in March 2025. Set in 1819 England, the novel centers His Lordship Christopher William Fitzwilliams Winterthrope, the Right Honorable Earl of Eden, who is secretly transgender and considered eccentric by others and lives with a small support staff far from London. Although happy with the status quo, he learns he must marry within the next year, which concerns him largely because many people would consider him a woman. In town, Christopher meets a valet, James Harding. Despite their differences, Christopher and James grow closer as they seek a wife for Christopher, becoming less interested in a successful outcome.

Kirkus Reviews described A Gentlemen's Gentleman as "a charming, compelling, and very queer Regency", stating that Alexander provides "a thoughtful, wholehearted exploration of trans life in another era". Publishers Weekly similarly referred to the novel as "an unadulterated delight", highlighting how the pairing between Christopher and James "is laugh-out-loud funny, as well as devastatingly tender". The New York Times included the novel on their list of "100 Notable Books of 2025".

A Gentlemen's Gentleman won the 2026 Lambda Literary Award for LGBTQ+ Romance & Erotica.

== A Lady for All Seasons (2026) ==
A Lady for All Seasons is a historical erotic romance novel published by Vintage on March 10, 2026. Set in 1820, the novel centers Miss Verbena Montrose, a spinster who must marry soon to support her family. To save both from financial wreckage, she proposes to marry her "Achillean" friend, Étienne Charbonneau. All is going well until Miss Flora Witcombe writes a poem regarding their relationship. Verbena visits Flora to confront her, but the two find a connection. Meanwhile, Verbena meets William Forsyth, a novelist from a minor noble family who is interested in her affection. What she doesn't know is that Flora and William are the same person.

A Lady for All Seasons was well received by critics, including starred reviews from Library Journal and Kirkus Reviews. Kirkus Reviews commended A Lady for All Seasons as "genderfluid historical romance at its finest, and funniest", while Publishers Weekly called it "witty and bighearted", though "somewhat less successful" than A Gentlemen's Gentleman.

== Publications ==
=== Chef's Kiss series ===
- Chef's Kiss. Emily Bestler Books. 2022. ISBN 978-1-982-18908-2.
- Chef's Choice. Emily Bestler Books. 2023. ISBN 978-1-982-18910-5.

=== Standalone novels ===
- Second Chances in New Port Stephen. Emily Bestler Books. 2023. ISBN 978-1-668-02196-5.
- Triple Sec. Emily Bestler Books. 2024. ISBN 978-1-668-02198-9.
- A Gentleman's Gentleman. Vintage. 2025. ISBN 978-0-593-68620-1.
- A Lady for All Seasons. Vintage. 2026. ISBN 979-8-217-00728-8.
