= The Deep & Dark Blue =

2020 graphic novel by Niki Smith

- Author: Niki Smith
- Language: English
- Genre: Graphic novel; LGBT literature; Young adult fiction; Fantasy
- Publisher: Little, Brown Books for Young Readers
- Publication date: January 7, 2020
- Publication place: United States
- Pages: 256 pp
- Awards: ALA Rainbow List Top 10
- ISBN: 9780316485982
- OCLC: 1134770360

The Deep & Dark Blue is a graphic novel written and illustrated by Niki Smith. It tells the story of identical twins Grayce, a transgender girl, and Hawke, a cisgender boy, who have to flee from their home when their cousin stages a coup on the kingdom and kills the rest of their family.

Smith's debut middle grade novel was published on January 7, 2020 by a Little, Brown and Company imprint, and was received positively by critics, who praised the writer's worldbuilding and the novel's affirmative look on transgender identity.

== Plot summary ==
Identical twins Hawke and Grayson sneak out to witness a solstice blessing ceremony held by the Communion of Blue, a religious order of women who worship a mother goddess and spin and weave a blue yarn that has supernatural properties. Next day, their grandfather is supposed to name their older cousin Reyden as heir to the House of Sunderlay, but a distant relative Mirelle stages a coup with her military unit and a mysterious hooded woman, planning to kill everyone above her in the succession order and burning a blue tapestry with family's tree. The twins escape and disguise themselves as "Hannah" and "Grayce", girls joining the Communion to avoid soldiers still looking to kill them.

The twins adjust differently - Hawke dislikes having to keep up the disguise and the unarmed combat technique of the Communion's guardians and wants to defeat Mirelle, while Grayce enjoys the sisterhood, her spinning role and wants to stay. They are recognized by a childhood friend and a Communion member Calia, who tells then that according to the rumors, Reyden started the coup which was thwarted by Mirelle.

When the Communion is about to bless Mirelle as the new heir, Hawke and Calia learn that a Communion sister named Audren helped Mirelle with the coup and is willing to grant her access to a mysterious library of the convent. They discover that the library holds copies of blue tapestries that magically show current rightful heirs of nobility. The Sunderlay tapestry copy shows that Reyden is still alive, and three friends deduce he must be held in the palace cellars. Hawke sees it as a chance to return to their previous life, and has to learn and accept that Grayce wants to continue to be a Communion sister.

The twins find Reyden kept alive and tortured by a blue thread of the Communion, and he says he's kept as a lure for the two of them, so Mirelle can get rid of all three of them. Grayce has to stop the spinning wheel, effectively killing Reyden and marking Hawke as the legitimate heir on the tapestry. The twins crash the ceremony and announce the truth about Mirelle. Mirelle and Audren try to stop them with swords and summoning fire with blue thread spinning, but the twins stop them with unarmed combat and summoning water with blue thread spinning. Mirelle is disgraced and Hawke is widely recognized as the true heir.

Grayce is visited by elderly sister Marta, who invites her to return to the Communion, saying that "girls who've found their way to us" have always been a part of the order. Calia and Hawke notice that Grayce's name has changed on the magical tapestry.

== Reception ==
The Deep & Dark Blue received a starred review by Kirkus Reviews, which praised its usage of bright colors to draw attention to certain aspects of the story, as well as the novel's "[d]ynamic panel layouts" that "give the story momentum and help communicate the tone." The reviewer also praised the diversity of the supporting cast. Publishers Weekly praised the "anime-inspired illustrations" by Smith, including the facial expressions shown by the characters, as well as the "capable worldbuilding and a positive look at transgender identity" present in the novel.

Writing for the School Library Journal, Kelley Gile noted the novel's art style was inspired by manga. Gile also mentioned the palette used in the novel, calling it "integral to the story". Kiri Palm, for the Bulletin of the Center for Children's Books said the novel "offers a refreshing spin on the crossdressing-for-noble-reasons trope" due to Grayce's story of self-discovery as a trans woman. Palm also mentions how the art plays a part in Grayce's revelation as it "allows the reader to slowly discover Grayce's comfort with feminine attire and the responsibilities of her new life in the Sisterhood", while her brother is not able to accept the same role.

In a review for The Comics Journal, Hillary Brown criticized the cover of the book, mentioning how some of the choices by the author "makes it feel like Smith is new to comics," but praised other aspects of the novel, such as the author's choice to not stretch "into a trilogy." Brown mentioned in a positive note how there is a bigger focus on "the discovery of one's true gender than in fighting sequences," and called the fighting scenes boring but "Grayce's face as she struggles with her new knowledge is touching and evocative." The reviewer also called attention to the pages' layout, saying Smith plays around with it to "create interesting compositions," and the color. Brown concluded the review by saying the novel "doesn't transcend its audience, but it plays to it okay."

=== Accolades ===
Accolades for The Deep & Dark Blue
| Year | Accolade | Result | Ref. |
|---|---|---|---|
| 2020 | Kirkus Reviews' Best Middle-Grade Books | Selection | |
| 2021 | ALA Rainbow Book List | Top 10 | |
| 2021 | Lambda Literary Award for Children's and Young Adult Literature | Shortlist | |
| 2021 | YALSA Great Graphic Novels for Teens | Selection | |
| 2021 | Prism Award for Best Comic for Young Readers | Won | |
| 2021 | Prism Award for Best Comic from a Mainstream Publisher | Nominated | |
