= Blue Delliquanti =

American comics creator

- Writing career
- Notable works: O Human Star, Meal, Across a Field of Starlight
- Website: https://www.bluedelliquanti.com/

Blue Delliquanti is an American graphic novelist and comics creator. They are known for the webcomic O Human Star and the graphic novels Meal, Across a Field of Starlight, and Adversary.

== Career ==
=== Webcomics ===
Delliquanti’s webcomic O Human Star was published from 2012 to 2020. It follows inventor Alastair Sterling, who is resurrected sixteen years after his death in a robotic body in a world where his technological advancements have resulted in humans and robots living side-by-side. Along with Brendan, who was his business partner and lover prior to his death, and Sulla, an android who was created with a copy of Sterling's mind but developed a distinct personality and who is a trans teenage girl, he attempts to adapt to his new life. It was nominated for both a Lambda Literary Award for LGBTQ+ Graphic Novel and Ignatz Award for Outstanding Online Comic, and won a Prism Award for Best Webcomic in 2018.

=== Graphic Novels ===
In 2018, Delliquanti published Meal, a graphic novel about Yarrow, a young chef in California seeking to make entomophagy popular and must prove herself to the stern chef Chandra Flores, as well as confess her feelings for her neighbor Milani. It was co-written with food writer and chef Soleil Ho, of whom Delliquanti was a fan of prior to their collaboration.

In 2022, they published the young adult science fiction graphic novel Across a Field of Starlight, which follows two non-binary teens in an intergalactic war who fall in love. In the same year, they published the erotic graphic novella Adversary. Set in Minneapolis in 2021, it follows Curtis, a middle-aged self-defense teacher who has recently come out as gay, and his former student Anton, a trans man, who enter a sexual relationship together.

They illustrated the 2024 comic book series Ghostbusters: Back in Town by Greg Pak and David M. Booher and the 2018 graphic novel The 'Stan by Kevin Knodell and David Axe, which is about the war in Afghanistan. They have contributed to The Legend of Korra: Patterns in Time, Smut Peddler, The Sleep of Reason, and Beyond. In 2019, Miles & Honesty in SCFSX!, an erotic comic written by Delliquanti and Kazimir Lee about a queer sex party that starred two characters that previously appeared in Delliquanti's Smut Peddler stories, won the Lambda Literary Award for LGBTQ+ Romance & Erotica.

== Personal life ==
Delliquanti is non-binary. They live in Minneapolis.

== Publications ==
- O Human Star. Vol. 1. Self-published. March 1, 2015. ISBN 978-0990995609.
- O Human Star. Vol. 2. Self-published. March 1, 2017. ISBN 978-0990995616.
- Kevin, Knodell; Axe, David (September 15, 2018). The 'Stan. Illustrated by Blue Delliquanti. Dead Reckoning Publishing. ISBN 978-1682470985.
- Delliquanti, Blue; Ho, Soleil (December 25, 2018). Meal. Iron Circus Comics. ISBN 978-1945820304.
- O Human Star. Vol. 3. Self-published. January 1, 2021. ISBN 978-0990995623.
- Across a Field of Starlight. Random House Graphic. February 8, 2022. ISBN 978-0593124147.
- Adversary. Silver Sprocket. March 23, 2024. ISBN 979-8886200386.
- Pak, Greg; Booher, David M. (November 5, 2024). Ghostbusters: Back in Town. Illustrated by Blue Delliquanti. Dark Horse Books. ISBN 978-1506735276.

== Accolades ==
Year	Title	Award	Result	Reference
2015	O Human Star	Ignatz Award for Outstanding Online Comic	Shortlisted	
2015	O Human Star	Lambda Literary Award for LGBTQ+ Graphic Novel	Shortlisted	
2018	O Human Star	Prism Award for Best Webcomic	Won	
2019	Meal	Prism Award for Best Comic from a Small to Midsize	Won	
2019	Miles & Honesty in SCFSX! (with Kamizir Lee)	Lambda Literary Award for LGBTQ+ Romance & Erotica	Won	
2022	Across a Field of Starlight	Cybils Award for Graphic Novel	Shortlisted	
2023	Adversary	Ignatz Award for Outstanding Online Comic	Shortlisted	
