= A.B.O. Comix =

American non-profit for LGBTQ prisoners

- Founded: 2017
- Founder: Casper Cendre
- Type: Non-profit
- Purpose: Supporting LGBTQ prisoners through artistic creation, publishing, advocacy, and community building
- Location: Oakland, California, USA
- Method: Annual anthologies, newsletters, direct support
- Revenue: Over $150,000 donated to LGBTQ prisoners' commissaries
- Website: Official website

A.B.O. Comix is a fiscally‐sponsored non‐profit organization based in Oakland, California, that supports LGBTQ prisoners by publishing their creative works, advocating on their behalf, and providing a platform for global recognition of incarcerated artists. Founded in 2017, the organization produces an annual anthology of queer prisoner comics - with proceeds directly benefitting contributors through commissary donations - as well as individual graphic novels, memoirs, and nonfiction literature. It also disseminates a free quarterly newsletter containing resources, submission opportunities, updates, and artwork for prisoners.

== History ==
A.B.O. Comix was founded in 2017 in Oakland by a small collective of queer activists and comic artists, including co-founder Casper Cendre. The project originated when the founders - drawing on years of experience in prison advocacy - began corresponding with incarcerated LGBTQ individuals through penpal programs. An initial call for submissions, placed in outlets such as the Black and Pink newspaper, resulted in a flood of letters and creative works from prisoners nationwide. This unexpected response encouraged the group to compile their first anthology, a project that evolved from a one‐off experiment into an annual publishing venture that not only showcases prisoner art but also channels funds back into the lives of its contributors.

== Awards and recognition ==
A.B.O. Comix has earned recognition within both the comics and activism communities: The organization is a Prism Award winner (2019 and 2021) for Best Anthology and was nominated for the 2021 Ignatz Award in the categories of Outstanding Anthology and Outstanding Series.

A.B.O. Comix work has been profiled by outlets such as KQED, Nerdist, NeoText Review, Street Sheet, and Women Write About Comics.

== See also ==
- Prison abolition
- LGBTQ rights in the United States
- Comics anthology
- Artivism
