= The Golden Hour (Smith novel) =

2021 graphic novel by Niki Smith

The Golden Hour is a middle-grade graphic novel by Niki Smith, published November 23, 2021, by Little, Brown and Company.

== Plot ==
The novel centers Manuel Soto, who saves his art teacher from an armed attacker, then experiences panic attacks and dissociation. With the help of his mom and therapist, he attempts to ground himself through photography. After befriending classmates Sebastian and Caysha, he spends time at Sebastian’s family’s cattle farm, where he finds space and time to reflect and find peace. Throughout the novel, romance sparks between Sebastian and Manuel.

== Reviews ==
The Golden Hour was well received by critics, including a starred review from Kirkus Reviews, Publishers Weekly, and School Library Journal. Kirkus described the novel as "exceptionally graceful and delightful", while Booklist referred to it as "an artful, conscientious, and deftly executed depiction of anxiety". School Library Journal named it one of the best graphic novels of 2021. The novel was a finalist for the 2022 Kirkus Prize for Young Readers' Literature.
