= SuperMutant Magic Academy =

2015 graphic novel by Jillian Tamaki

- Date: April 28, 2015
- Publisher: Drawn & Quarterly

Creative team
- Creator: Jillian Tamaki
- ISBN: 9781770461987

SuperMutant Magic Academy is a fantasy webcomic by Jillian Tamaki published from 2010 to 2014, which was adapted into a graphic novel in 2015 by Drawn & Quarterly. It is currently being adapted into an upcoming animated series by Cartoon Network Studios.

== Plot ==
The series is told through largely episodic short vignettes looking at Supermutant Magic Academy's students' daily lives. The graphic novel version contains a exclusive concluding story set during prom.

== Characters ==
- Marsha - a sardonic girl with a bowl cut and glasses. She can fly on a broom.
- Wendy - a student with fox ears. She is Marsha’s friend and crush. One comic shows she has the ability to turn into a fox.
- Gemma - a girl with a large bulbous forehead. She is sensitive and artistic, and is frequently bullied by other students.
- Trixie - a dinosaur-like girl with a bow on her head who often hangs out with Gemma.
- Frances - a student who creates surrealistic artworks and films. She is a smoker.
- Everlasting Boy - a boy who cannot die. He frequently subjected to graphic incidents, sometimes self-inflicted, such as by letting himself be mauled by wolves, being torn apart by an unexplained gravitational event, or being eaten alive by ants, only to reform and come back to life. He is shown to have had a girlfriend he outlived.
- Trevor - a boy that can shoot lasers. He is bald with a lightning bolt symbol on his head and has no pupils. He is often impulsive and rude, but is shown to have a sensitive side.
- Cat - a seemingly normal cat that wears a school uniform.

== Reception ==
Publishers Weekly gave the book a starred review, noting that "Marsha’s very real love for Wendy drives the text, but other students have their own agonies" and that while the humor was "sometimes slapstick, but more often it offers ultra-dry observations on modern disengagement." School Library Journal also gave a starred review.

Rachel Cooke of The Guardian said "the majority of its strips are sassy, mordantly funny and feel true in ways that most other depictions of teenage angst simply don’t. But every so often, one will fall completely flat, climaxing in a baffling non-joke that leaves you scratching your head... [but] all you have to do is turn the page: another gag will be along any second."

In 2013, Mey of Autostraddle said of the webcomic "[it's] at once totally surreal and completely relatable for anyone who went to high school." She noted the characters of Marsha and her crush Wendy as her favorite characters, saying "The comics with Marsha and Wendy are sometimes so cute and touching that your heart melts and other times so awkward that they cause all the embarrassing things you’ve done around your secret crushes to come flashing before your eyes." Her later review of the complete book stated that it was "one of the best books, not just best graphic novels, but one of the best books of any kind to come out in a long time." SuperMutant Magic Academy was also nominated in three categories in 2015 Autostraddle Comic and Sequential Art Awards (Favorite Graphic Novel/Book, Favorite Writer/Artist, and Favorite Queer Comic Character, for Marsha).

Slate included in a list of the best books of 2015, noting that while early pages were uneven, "SuperMutant grows along with its cast of characters."

=== Accolades ===
Year	Award/Honor	Category	Result	Ref.
2016	Eisner Awards	Best Publication for Teens	Won	
2016	Doug Wright Awards	Best Book	Shortlisted	
2016	American Library Association Rainbow Book List		Top Ten	
2016	Great Graphic Novels for Teens		Included	
2015	Ignatz Awards	Outstanding Artist	Shortlisted	
2015	Ignatz Awards	Outstanding Anthology or Collection	Shortlisted	
2013	Ignatz Awards	Outstanding Online Comic	Won	
2012	Ignatz Awards	Outstanding Online Comic	Won	

== Animated series ==
An animated series based on the comic was announced in June 2024, to be produced by Cartoon Network Studios for Adult Swim and co-created by Tamaki and J. G. Quintel. A preview of the series was released at the 2026 Annecy International Animation Film Festival.
