= Infestation (comics) =

Comic book crossover published by IDW Publishing

Publication information
- Publisher: IDW Publishing
- Publication date: January – September 2011
- No. of issues: 14
- Main character(s): CVO: Covert Vampiric Operations; Zombies vs. Robots; Star Trek; Transformers; G.I. Joe; Ghostbusters; Pocket God

Infestation is a comic book crossover published by IDW Publishing, and connecting various of its licensed and original series together. It was published from January to April 2011. It consisted of two book-end one-shots, Infestation #1–2, set in the Zombies vs. Robots and CVO universes, and two-issue limited series from the G.I. Joe, Transformers, Ghostbusters, and Star Trek universes. Also, IDW published a digital-only Pocket God tie-in issue in May 2011 which was included in the hardcover book.

IDW then released a four-issue epilogue series titled Infestation: Outbreak from June 2011 – September 2011. It picked up on the CVO after the events of Infestation and also introduced the events of the Groom Lake limited series into the same continuity of the CVO. IDW also published a four-issue follow-up series set in the Zombies vs. Robots universe after the events of Infestation, entitled Zombies vs. Robots: UnderCity.

In 2012, IDW released a sequel event titled Infestation 2.

== Premise ==
Britt (from CVO: Covert Vampiric Operations) comes in contact with the Undermind (from Zombies vs. Robots) to bring armies of zombies across the universes of Star Trek, The Transformers, Ghostbusters, G.I. Joe, and pocket god.

== Titles ==
=== Infestation #1 ===
Published in January 2011. Written by Dan Abnett and Andy Lanning with art by David Messina.

=== Star Trek: Infestation #1-2 ===
Published biweekly in February 2011. Written by Scott Tipton and David Tipton with art by Casey Maloney.

=== The Transformers: Infestation #1-2 ===
Published biweekly in February 2011. Written by Dan Abnett and Andy Lanning with art by Nick Roche.

=== Ghostbusters: Infestation #1-2 ===
Published biweekly in March 2011. Written by Erik Burnham with art by Kyle Hotz.

=== G.I. Joe: Infestation #1-2 ===
Published biweekly in March 2011. Written by Mike Raicht with art by Giovanni Timpano.

=== Infestation #2 ===
Published in April 2011. Written by Dan Abnett and Andy Lanning with art by David Messina.

=== Infestation: CVO 100-Page Spectacular ===
Published in April 2011. A repackaging of older CVO comics.

=== Pocket God: Infestation #1 ===
Published in digital format only in May 2011. First in print in the Infestation hardcover.

=== Zombies vs. Robots: UnderCity #1-4 ===
Published monthly from April 2011 - July 2011. Written by Chris Ryall with art by Mark Torres.

=== Infestation: Outbreak #1-4 ===
Published monthly from June 2011 - September 2011. Written by Chris Ryall and Tom Waltz with art by David Messina.

== Collected editions ==
The series has been collected into a number of trade paperbacks:

=== Preludes ===
Title	Material collected	Release date	ISBN
CVO: Covert Vampirirc Operations	CVO: Covert Vampiric Operations #1; CVO: Artifact #1-3	October 2004	978-1-932382-40-2
CVO: Rogue State	CVO: Rogue State #1-5	April 2008	978-1-932382-93-8
CVO: African Blood	CVO: African Blood #1-4	April 2008	978-1-60010-210-3
Complete Zombies vs. Robots	Zombies vs. Robots #1-2; Zombies vs. Robots vs. Amazons #1-3	August 2008	978-1-60010-328-5
Groom Lake	Groom Lake #1-4	October 2009	978-1-60010-536-4
Zombies vs. Robots: Aventure	Zombies vs. Robots: Aventure #1-4	September 2010	978-1600107177

=== Original series ===
Title	Material collected	Release date	ISBN
Infestation, Vol. 1	Infestation #1; Transformers: Infestation #1-2; G.I. Joe: Infestation #1-2	August 2011	978-1-60010-977-5
Infestation, Vol. 2	Star Trek: Infestation #1-2; Ghostbusters: Infestation #1-2; Infestation #2	August 2011	978-1-61377-003-0
Infestation	Infestation #1-2; Transformers: Infestation #1-2; G.I. Joe: Infestation #1-2; Star Trek: Infestation #1-2; Ghostbusters: Infestation #1-2; Pocket God: Infestation #1	December 2011	978-1-61377-106-8

=== Epilogue series ===
Title	Material collected	Release date	ISBN
Zombies vs. Robots: UnderCity	Zombies vs. Robots: UnderCity #1-4	October 2011	978-1-61377-073-3
Infestation: Outbreak	Infestation: Outbreak #1-4	December 2011	978-1-61377-107-5
