= Midsummer Sisters =

2026 graphic novel by Niki Smith

- Date: June 9, 2026
- Page count: 272 pages
- Publisher: Graphix

Creative team
- Creator: Niki Smith
- ISBN: 9781546128946

Midsummer Sisters is a middle-grade graphic novel by Niki Smith, published June 9, 2026, by Graphix.

== Plot ==
The novel centers tween stepsisters Quinn and Kenzie as their parents' marriage is breaking apart, which threatens their relationship. To momentarily remove the girls from the situation, their grandmother takes them to North Carolina's Outer Banks. Together, they explore the area and appreciate the local wildlife. When not together, Kenzie looks for beach collectables, while Quinn texts her friend and crush back home, Willow. Meanwhile, the girls worry what life would be like if their parents divorced, dissolving their sisterhood.

== Reviews ==
The novel was well received by critics, including starred reviews from The Horn Book Magazine, Kirkus Reviews, Publishers Weekly, School Library Journal, and Shelf Awareness. Kirkus described the novel as "an expressive, heartfelt exploration of the bonds that hold us together", while Publishers Weekly described it as "expertly crafted and emotionally perceptive".
