= Hazel Newlevant =

American cartoonist and editor

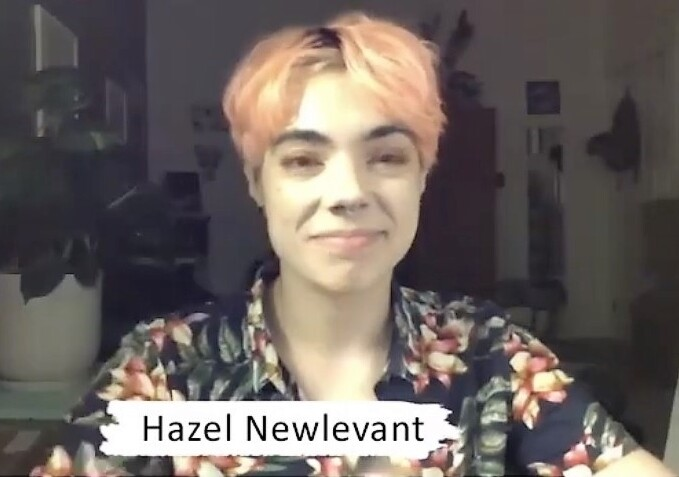
Newlevant speaks at Small Press Expo 2020

Hazel Newlevant is an American cartoonist and editor known for creating and editing comics about queer history, bisexuality, polyamory, and reproductive rights. Raised in Portland, Oregon, Newlevant lives in Queens, New York.

== Career ==
Newlevant's thesis project for the School of Visual Arts was a comic about Harlem Renaissance blues singer and drag performer Gladys Bently called If This Be Sin. The comic won the 2013 Queer Press Grant from Prism Comics.

In 2016, Newlevant edited and self-published the comics anthology Chainmail Bikini, which collects experiences of female and nonbinary gamers. The name of the collection refers to the "chainmail bikini" trope, criticizing to the over-sexualization of female character design in video games. In 2017, they co-edited (with Whit Taylor and OK Fox) reproductive rights anthology Comics For Choice, a collection of 42 comics about abortion, gender, and reproductive rights. Critic Catherine Baker described the collection, which won the 2018 Ignatz Award for Outstanding Anthology, as "a remarkable set of testimonies that are both collective and personal." Publishers Weekly praised the book, saying, "The book is at once a rallying cry, a tender lament, and song of liberation that will resonate long after the final page is turned."

In 2017, Newlevant wrote and drew Sugar Town, a polyamorous queer romance published by Alternative Comics. The comic received positive reviews for its tender approach to relationships. Kirkus Reviews described Sugar Town as a "lushly illustrated comic that explores bisexuality, queer culture, and unconventional sex." Critic Tegan O'Neil of The Comics Journal reviewed Sugar Town saying, "Emotional honesty, more than anything else, that elevates Sugar Town beyond the reader's expectations. It's a book that deals frankly with some very tender feelings – deep vulnerability, yes, but also embarrassment, passion, anxiety, and finally genuine love."

At Oni Press, Newlevant co-edited the comics anthology Puerto Rico Strong, a collection of comics about Puerto Rican history and identity which raised money for Hurricane Maria recovery efforts. The book won the 2019 Eisner Award for Best Anthology.

In 2019, Lion Forge published Newlevant's memoir No Ivy League, a coming-of-age story that examines queer identity, male privilege, and white privilege. Critics noted Newlevant's "sensitive brushwork and attention to body language" and their ability to combine "sheer talent with the supple versatility of an adroit graphical storyteller."

== Recognition and awards ==
- 2019 Eisner Award "Best Anthology" for Puerto Rico Strong
- 2018 Ignatz Award "Outstanding Anthology" for Comics for Choice
- 2017 Ignatz Award "Outstanding Mini-Comic" for Tender-Hearted
- 2013 Prism Comics Queer Press Grant for If This Be Sin
- 2012 Xeric Grant for Ci Vediamo
