= How to Be Ace: A Memoir of Growing Up Asexual =

2020 graphic memoir

- The book's cover
- Author: Rebecca Burgess
- Genre: Autobiography; Graphic novel; nonfiction
- Publisher: Jessica Kingsley Publishers/Hachette Book Group
- Publication date: October 21, 2020
- Media type: Print (paperback)
- Pages: 184
- Awards: Prism Awards Finalist, 2021 Great Graphic Novels for Teens – Young Adult Library Services Association (YALSA), 2022
- ISBN: 978-1-787-75215-3

How to Be Ace: A Memoir of Growing Up Asexual is a 2020 graphic memoir by British illustrator Rebecca Burgess. It was published by Jessica Kingsley Publishers, an imprint of Hachette. The book details Burgess's experience growing up as an asexual person, and how they learned about asexuality.

It was a finalist for the 2021 Prism Awards for Small/Midsize Press by Prism Comics, and is one of seventeen books permanently banned from the Wentzville School District in Wentzville, Missouri, United States, in response to Senate Bill No. 775.

== Reception ==
Broken Frontier reviewed the book, stating it was "both informative and heartfelt" and "strikes a fine balance between memoir and information." Maren Kyle on the website Graphic Medicine noted how the book would help foster empathy in allosexual readers, and how asexual readers would "undoubtedly recognize some of their own struggles in Burgess's story". The book was subject to an analysis by Semmy Claassen in Diggit Magazine which explored the relationship between asexuality and otherness.

The book was a finalist for the 2021 Prism Awards for Small/Midsize Press by Prism Comics. It was also included in the 2022 Great Graphic Novels for Teens list by the Young Adult Library Services Association (a division of the American Library Association).

=== Book ban ===
The book is one of seventeen that are banned from the Wentzville School District in Wentzville, Missouri, United States, in response to Missouri's Senate Bill No. 775. The book was also one of 170 that between Johnson City and Kingsport Public Libraries in Tennessee that was flagged as "inappropriate".

== See also ==
- Speak Up! – graphic novel also by Burgess
- Gender Queer: A Memoir – A similar book about queer experiences
