= Rebecca Burgess (illustrator) =

British writer and illustrator

- Notable work: Speak Up!; How to Be Ace: A Memoir of Growing Up Asexual
- Website: www.rebeccaburgess.co.uk

Signature
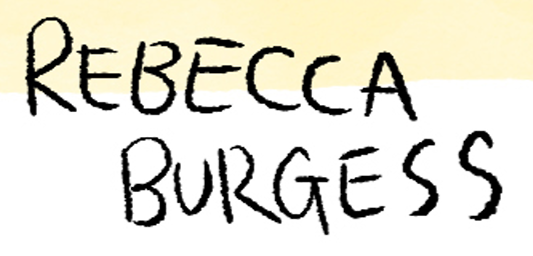

Rebecca Burgess is a British illustrator and writer. They (Note: Burgess uses singular they pronouns.) are known for their graphic novels Speak Up! and How to Be Ace: A Memoir of Growing Up Asexual.

== Early and personal life ==
Burgess became interested in comics in the late 1990s and early 2000s, being inspired by Japanese manga. They began selling small press comics when they were 14 years old. They have a university degree in sequential illustration. Burgess has cited the artists Osamu Tezuka, Kaoru Mori, and Posy Simmonds as inspirations, and stated that their experience in small press publication heavily influenced their art. Burgess lives in Bristol, England. They are autistic and asexual, and they have a girlfriend.

== Career ==
An updated 2024 version of Understanding the Spectrum, a comic illustrated and written by Burgess. It features Mia, the protagonist of Speak Up!.

In 2016, Burgess posted a webcomic on Tumblr titled Understanding the Spectrum. The comic explains the autism spectrum and aims to dispel misconceptions about it being a linear spectrum, instead showing it as a round spectrum comprising various traits and ways to process information. Burgess created the comic with the aim of highlighting and educating about autistic stereotyping. It was released in April for Autism Acceptance Week. In 2017, Burgess made a series of webcomics about autism for The Guardian.

In 2021, Burgess' first book, How to Be Ace: A Memoir of Growing Up Asexual, was published by Jessica Kingsley Publishers (an Imprint of Hachette). It is a graphic memoir about their experiences growing up asexual and discovering asexuality. The book was a finalist for the 2021 Prism Awards for Small/Midsize Press by Prism Comics. It was also included in the 2022 Great Graphic Novels for Teens list by the Young Adult Library Services Association (a division of the American Library Association). How to Be Ace is one of seventeen books that are permanently banned from the Wentzville School District in Wentzville, Missouri, United States in response to Senate Bill No. 775. The book was also one of 170 that between Johnson City and Kingsport Public Libraries in Tennessee that was flagged as "inappropriate".

In 2022, HarperCollins published their second book, Speak Up!. The graphic novel follows an autistic middle schooler named Mia and her friend Charlie who privately write music under the pseudonym Elle-Q. The book was included on the 2022 Best Graphic Novels for Children Reading List by the American Library Association. In October 2023, the book was listed in a collection of diverse books by Scholastic that schools could opt out of being included in their book fairs. The policy was reversed later the same month.

Burgess also wrote the webcomic series Pauper's Prince, a regency-style romantic fantasy comic inspired by Bridgerton. They posted it online serially before funding physical self-publication of several volumes through Kickstarter. The comic follows two characters in a gay-asexual relationship, and one of them has autism. The relationship between the characters was inspired by Burgess and their girlfriend. Burgess spoke at a panel held by the nonprofit Autism Scene at the 2026 San Diego Comic-Con.

== Bibliography ==
=== Illustrated and wrote ===
- Burgess, Rebecca (2021). How to Be Ace: A Memoir of Growing Up Asexual. Jessica Kingsley Publishers. ISBN 978-1-78775-215-3.
- Burgess, Rebecca (2022). Speak Up!. HarperCollins. ISBN 978-0-06-308120-8.
- Burgess, Rebecca. Incorruptible #1. Self published.
- Burgess, Rebecca. Paupers Prince #1. Self published.
- Burgess, Rebecca. A Spectrum of Comics. Self published.
- Burgess, Rebecca. Paupers Prince #2. Self published.

=== Illustrated ===
- Grandin, Temple (March 19, 2020). Foreword. The Spectrum Girl's Survival Guide: How to Grow Up Awesome and Autistic. By Castellon, Siena. Illustrated by Rebecca Burgess. Jessica Kingsley Publishers. ISBN 978-1787751835.
- Seigal, Joshua (September 11, 2023). Poetry is NOT for me!. Illustrated by Rebecca Burgess. HarperCollins. ISBN 978-0008624583.
- J. Pla, Sally (September 4, 2023). Ada and Zaza. Illustrated by Rebecca Burgess. HarperCollins. ISBN 978-0008605988.
- Montgomerie, Samantha (September 22, 2025). The Unstoppables. Illustrated by Rebecca Burgess. HarperCollins. ISBN 978-0008754174.
- Brukner, Lauren (2025). How to Be a Superhero Called Self-Control 2nd Edition. Illustrated by Rebecca Burgess (1st ed.). Jessica Kingsley Publishers. ISBN 978-1-80501-755-4.
- Brukner, Lauren (2025). The Kids' Guide to Staying Awesome and in Control, 2nd Edition. Illustrated by Rebecca Burgess (1st ed.). Jessica Kingsley Publishers. ISBN 978-1-80501-758-5.
- Parker, Lindsey Rowe (2024). Calming My Jitters at School. Illustrated by Rebecca Burgess. BQB Publishing. ASIN B0CVTT77LJ. ISBN 979-8886330236.
- Parker, Lindsey Rowe (2021). Wiggles, Stomps, and Squeezes Calm My Jitters Down. Illustrated by Rebecca Burgess. BQB Publishing. ISBN 978-1945448928.
- Garvey, Niamh; Burgess, Rebecca (2024). Being Autistic (And What That Actually Means). Illustrated by Rebecca Burgess. Jessica Kingsley Publishers. ISBN 978-1-80501-171-2.
