= Hans Rickheit =

American cartoonist

- Born: January 12, 1973 (age 53) Massachusetts, U.S.
- Area: Cartoonist
- Notable works: The Squirrel Machine; Cochlea & Eustachia; Delia
- Awards: Xeric Award (2001)

Hans Rickheit (born January 12, 1973) is an American cartoonist.

Rickheit's work is often set in the past, in vaguely defined periods ranging from the Victorian era to the 1950s. It has been described as surreal, dreamlike, and erotic; themes of body horror are not unusual. Many of Rickheit's stories take place in the "fictional township of Clemens, which probably exists somewhere in Eastern Massachusetts." His "meticulously illustrated" black-and-white art has been praised as "lovingly detailed" with "a classic, timely feel." Rickheit has described his work as obscurantist.

== Biography ==
=== Early life and education ===
Hans Rickheit was born in 1973 and grew up in Ashburnham, Massachusetts.

At age 11, he produced and published his own xeroxed minicomic. He began creating surrealistic comics early in his adolescence, many of which were reviewed in Factsheet Five in the late 1980s and early 1990s while he was still in high school.

After graduating high school in 1992, he attended Marlboro College in Vermont but left after one semester, deciding that he was not suited for academic life.

=== Career ===
While living in Brattleboro, Vermont, Rickheit drew and self-published his first amateur graphic novel, Kill, Kill, Kill — a crude attempt at long-form graphic storytelling that was largely ignored (and deservedly so, according to Rickheit himself).

In 1997, he moved into the basement of the Zeitgeist Gallery in Cambridge, Massachusetts, immersing himself in the local underground arts and performance scene. From 1995 to 2007, the Zeitgeist Gallery served as a hub for underground arts in the Boston area, hosting avant-garde music performances, poetry readings, film screenings, progressive political actions, pirate radio broadcasts, and various underground newspapers.

During this period, Rickheit published the anthology newspaper The Cambridge Inferno, which featured work from many local cartoonists. Alongside numerous self-published mini-comics and promotional posters for gallery events and concerts, he wrote and illustrated multiple issues of his surrealist comic book Chrome Fetus. (He also produced his second long-form graphic novel, Chloe, which won the Xeric Award in 2001.

Circa 2003, Rickheit also started serializing Cochlea & Eustachia, chronicling the surreal adventures of its title characters, who frequently appear in his works. The ongoing strip began being published in Seattle's alternative weekly The Stranger.

In 2007, the Zeitgeist Gallery was transformed into its current incarnation, The Lily Pad. At that time, Rickheit moved to Philadelphia with microtonal violinist Katt Hernandez, for whom he created many posters and album covers.

During this period, Richheit's comics appeared in various widely distributed anthologies, including Kramers Ergot, Proper Gander, Paper Rodeo, Blurred Visions, and Danny Hellman’s Legal Action Comics and Typhon.

In 2009, he completed what many consider his breakout work, The Squirrel Machine, published by Fantagraphics in a deluxe hardcover edition. The Squirrel Machine is a surreal and unsettling graphic novel about two brothers, Edmund and William, whose obsession with grotesque inventions and anatomical art leads them down a nightmarish path of repression, transformation, and madness. Set in a strange Victorian world, it explores the blurry line between genius and deviance through haunting imagery and dream logic. The book was a critical success, appearing on multiple best-of-the-year lists and remaining his most well-known work. That same year, Rickheit and Katt Hernandez parted ways.

During this time, he began the webcomic Ectopiary, a "supernatural" story about "a girl who is sent to live with relatives who are also caring for her sick mother." The webcomic was planned for 600 pages, but ran for about 130 before being discontinued.

In 2012, Fantagraphics published Folly: The Consequences of Indiscretion, a collection of Rickheit’s Chrome Fetus comics and other art. In 2014, Fantagraphics published the first volume of Cochlea & Eustachia, compiling the initial story arc from the webcomic.

That same year, he and Krissy Dorn began collaborating on Delia, a webcomic featuring an anthropomorphic squirrel scientist. The first collected volume was published by Fantagraphics in 2022.

In 2018, Rickheit launched The Gloaming, an adults-only comic book series, funded by a successful Kickstarter campaign. The series ran for seven issues from 2018 to 2023. In 2024, Mansion Press began publishing The Gloaming in graphic novel format, starting from the beginning of the series. The Mansion Press edition is expected to span five volumes over the next few years.

Concurrently with The Gloaming, Rickheit began self-publishing the second volume of Cochlea & Eustachia in serialized comic book format. Four issues have been released so far, with a fifth planned for this year.

Additionally, in 2025 he created his first semi-animated featurette, a 16-minute adaptation of Cochlea & Eustachia, available on YouTube. Rickheit handled all the drawing and most of the music, with character voices provided by Krissy Dorn.

== Personal life ==
In 2009 Rickheit moved to Western Massachusetts. Soon after, he met artist Krissy Dorn. They moved to his hometown of Ashburnham and married in 2012.

As of 2023, Hans Rickheit resides in Orange, Massachusetts.

== Bibliography ==
=== Webcomics ===
- Ectopiary (2009–c. 2016)
- Cochlea & Eustachia
- (with Krissy Dorn) Delia

=== Comics and graphic novels ===
- Kill, Kill, Kill (c. 1996)
- Chrome Fetus (self-published, 6 issues, 1996–2004)
- (with writer Ryu) Sigmund Freud (Chrome Fetus Comics, 1998)
- Debris (c. 2000) — "A collection of over ten years' worth of work. Observe the progress of a struggling cartoonist from his days as a high school loser to a college dropout."
- Chloe (Chrome Fetus Comics, 2001) — published with the assistance of the Xeric Foundation
- The Squirrel Machine (Fantagraphics, 2009)
- Folly: The Consequences of Indiscretion (Fantagraphics, 2012) — collecting Chrome Fetus and other art
- Cochlea & Eustachia webcomic
  - Cochlea & Eustachia vol. 1 (Fantagraphics, 2014; re-released by Chrome Fetus Comix, 2025) — compiling the initial story arc from the webcomic
  - Cochlea & Eustachia vol. 2 (5 issues, self-published, c. 2019-2023)
    - Cochlea & Eustachia vol. 2 trade paperback (Chrome Fetus Comix, 2024)
- (with Krissy Dorn) Delia (Fantagraphics, 2022)
- The Gloaming (7 issues, self-published, 2018)
  - The Gloaming vol. 1 trade paperback (Mansion Press, 2024) — collects issues #1-2
  - The Gloaming vol. 2 trade paperback (Mansion Press, 2025) — collects issues #3–4
- Book of Drawings (self-published, c. 2023)
- Mechanical Stilt-Women of Mars (Chrome Fetus Comix, 2025)
