= Speak Up! (graphic novel) =

2022 graphic novel by Rebecca Burgess

- Date: 13 September 2022
- Page count: 272 pages
- Publisher: HarperCollins

Creative team
- Creator: Rebecca Burgess
- ISBN: 978-0-06-308120-8

Speak Up! is a graphic novel written and illustrated by Rebecca Burgess. It follows Mia, an autistic middle schooler who becomes a viral sensation for her singing. It was published on 13 September 2022 by HarperCollins.

== Plot summary ==
Understanding the Spectrum, a comic illustrated and written by Burgess. It features Mia, the protagonist of Speak Up!.

Autistic middle schooler Mia is bullied by her classmates over her disability. In private, she and her non-binary friend Charlie write song lyrics, and Mia ends up becoming a viral sensation under the alias of singer Elle-Q. This leads to conflict when one of her bullies becomes one of Elle-Q's biggest fans and Charlie wants them to participate in the school talent show.

== Reception ==
Speak Up! was reviewed by Kirkus Reviews, Publishers Weekly, the Horn Book, Book Trust, and Association of Children's Librarians. Kirkus Reviews dubbed the book a "fun, sweet story about being oneself" and described the art as "a bit flat but nevertheless cute and expressive". Book Trust called the book "accessible and deeply heart-warming" and noted a subplot with Mia's relationship with her mother.

The book was included on the 2022 Best Graphic Novels for Children Reading List by the American Library Association.

In October 2023, the book was listed in a collection of diverse books by Scholastic that schools could opt out of being included in their book fairs. The policy was reversed later the same month.

== See also ==
- How to Be Ace: A Memoir of Growing Up Asexual – graphic novel also by Rebecca Burgess
