= Ghostbusters: Dead Man's Chest =

2025 comic book series

- Cover art.

Publication information
- Publisher: Dark Horse Comics
- Genre: Supernatural fiction
- Publication date: May 21, 2025 — September 3, 2025
- No. of issues: 4
- Main character: Ghostbusters (Columbia Pictures)

Creative team
- Written by: David M. Booher
- Penciller: Aviv Or
- Letterer: Jimmy Betancourt
- Colorist: Cristiane Peter

Ghostbusters: Dead Man's Chest is an American limited comic book series that was published in 2025 by Dark Horse Comics. The series is set between Ghostbusters: Afterlife and Ghostbusters: Frozen Empire.

== Synopsis ==
Set after Ghostbusters: Back in Town and before Ghostbusters: Frozen Empire, Ghostbusters: Dead Man's Chest follows the Spengler family in New York City as they encounter Captain Kidd.

=== Main characters ===
- Gary Grooberson: A science teacher and a seismologist who was briefly possessed by Vinz Clortho the Keymaster and was present during the defeat of Gozer the Gozerian.
- Callie Spengler: The daughter of Dr. Egon Spengler who was briefly possessed by Zuul the Gatekeeper and was present during the defeat of Gozer the Gozerian.
- Trevor Spengler: A grandchild of Dr. Egon Spengler who was present during the defeat of Gozer the Gozerian.
- Phoebe Spengler: A grandchild of Dr. Egon Spengler who was present during the defeat of Gozer the Gozerian.
- Lucky Domingo: A friend of the Spengler family who was present during the defeat of Gozer the Gozerian.
- Winston Zeddemore: A Ghostbuster and the head of Zeddemore Industries who was present during the defeat of Gozer the Gozerian and Vigo the Carpathian.
- Ray Stantz: A Ghostbuster who was present during the defeat of Gozer the Gozerian and Vigo the Carpathian.
- Captain Kidd

== Issues ==
Issue #	Title	Written by	Drawn by	Colored by	Lettered by	Publication date
1	"Ghostbusters: Dead Man's Chest #1"	David M. Booher	Aviv Or	Cristiane Peter	Jimmy Betancourt	May 21, 2025
2	"Ghostbusters: Dead Man's Chest #2"	David M. Booher	Aviv Or	Cristiane Peter	Jimmy Betancourt	July 2, 2025
3	"Ghostbusters: Dead Man's Chest #3"	David M. Booher	Aviv Or	Cristiane Peter	Jimmy Betancourt	August 6, 2025
4	"Ghostbusters: Dead Man's Chest #4"	David M. Booher	Aviv Or	Cristiane Peter	Jimmy Betancourt	September 3, 2025
