= Transformers/Ghostbusters =

Comic book series

- Cover to Transformers/Ghostbusters #1. Art by Nick Roche.

Publication information
- Publisher: IDW Publishing
- Format: Limited series
- Genre: Crossover; Science fiction Supernatural fiction
- Publication date: June 26, 2019 — October 2, 2019
- No. of issues: 5
- Main character(s): Transformers (Hasbro); Ghostbusters (Columbia Pictures)

Creative team
- Written by: Erik Burnham
- Penciller(s): Dan Schoening
- Letterer(s): Tom B. Long
- Colorist(s): Luis Antonio Delgado
- Editor(s): David Mariotte; Tom Waltz

Transformers/Ghostbusters is an American limited comic book series published in 2019 by IDW Publishing. The series serves as a crossover event between Hasbro's Transformers and Sony Pictures/Columbia Pictures' Ghostbusters, celebrating the 35th anniversary of both franchises.

== Plot ==
Cybertron is invaded by Gozer the Traveler, who unleashed a giant beast based on Starscream's imagination, leading the planet to its destruction. In present day, on Earth, in New York City, the Ghostbusters meet Ectronymous Diamatron, an Autobot who tracked a Cybertronian signal on Earth, one that is trapped in the ghost trap. During a small confrontation between Ectronymous and the Ghostbusters, the ghost trap is turned off, freeing Starscream's ghost, revealing it was the same signal that Ectronymous detected. Starscream reveals that during Cybertron's destruction, Megatron made a deal with an alien ghost named Kremzeek, turning Megatron into a ghost, as well as Starscream, Soundwave and Shockwave. At the Ghostbusters' firehouse headquarters, Ectronymous accepts the nicknamed "Ectotron", while Starscream is put inside the ghost trap once again. Meanwhile, Optimus Prime is trying to stay hidden while searching for Ectotron. After dealing with a blackout on Brooklyn, Ectotron reunites with Optimus, only for the Ghostbusters to find out Starscream escaped from the ghost trap. Ectotron is possessed by Starscream, while Kremzeek arrives at Earth, leading Optimus Prime and the Ghostbusters to have a tough battle. At the end of the battle, the Autobots and Ghostbusters succeed as Ectotron is freed from Starscream's possession and Kreemzeek is eaten by an Earthling ghost the heroes have summoned. However, the ghosts of Megatron, Soundwave and Shockwave appear. Both the Autobots and Ghostbusters trap the Decepticon ghosts into new traps, while Starscream escapes, vowing to return one day. Optimus and Ectotron accept to stay with the Ghostbusters. Starscream intercepts the Autobot spaceship, where the remaining Autobots are inside.

== Publication history ==
=== Comic book ===
The Transformers/Ghostbusters series is written by Erik Burnham, illustrated by Dan Schoening and colored by Luis Antonio Delgado. The series serves to celebrate the 35th anniversary of Hasbro's Transformers and Columbia Pictures' Ghostbusters.

IDW Publishing's editor-in-chief John Barber said “1984 was a seismic shift for entertainment, the year that launched both Transformers and Ghostbusters. Back then, Little John Barber was right there for Transformers and a little scared of Ghostbusters—but now, I'm a bit braver and can't wait to see the two worlds collide.”

During an interview with Syfy Wire, IDW's editor Tom Waltz said "We’ve been calling Transformers/Ghostbusters (the "Ghosts of Cybertron" storyline) "The Crossover Event 35 Years in the Making," but once we got started, we quickly realized it's the crossover that was ALWAYS meant to be – it's that much fun. And who better to bring it all together than the superstar creative team of Erik Burnham, Dan Schoening, and Luis Antonio Delgado, the undisputed champions of awesome ’80s mash-ups!"

=== Toy ===
As part of the Transformers Collaborative series, Hasbro released in 2019 a toy figure based on the character Ectotron, which is also based on the Ecto-1 vehicle. They also released an exclusive recolor of the Masterpiece MP-10 Optimus Prime toy with a Ghostbusters-themed color scheme and accessory sets.

In 2021, the Ectotron toy was retooled and given a Target-exclusive rerelease to tie into Ghostbusters: Afterlife. This release comes packaged with the first issue of the comic series.

== Characters ==
Transformers characters	Ghostbusters characters	Original characters
Brawn; Bruticus; Buzzsaw; Bumblebee; Cliffjumper; Dark Guardian; Devastator; Dropkicks; Furg; Grapple; Grimlock; Hotlink; Ironhide; Jazz; Kremzeek; Laserbeak; Megatron; Nacelle; Optimus Prime; Predaking; Prowl; Ratchet; Ravage; Reflector; Sentinel; Shockwave; Skywarp; Soundwave; Starscream; Straxus; Sunstorm; Sunstreaker; Thundercracker; Trailbreaker; Wheeljack; Windcharger	Gozer; Vinz Clortho; Zuul; Janine Melnitz; Slimer; Ray Stantz; Egon Spengler; Peter Venkman; Winston Zeddemore	Ectronymous Diamatron / Ectotron; Killerwatt

== Issues ==
Issue #	Title	Written by	Drawn by	Colored by	Lettered by	Publication date
1	"Ghosts of Cybertron, Part 1"	Erik Burnham	Dan Schoening	Luis Antonio Delgado	Tom B. Long	June 26, 2019
2	"Ghosts of Cybertron, Part 2"	Erik Burnham	Dan Schoening	Luis Antonio Delgado	Tom B. Long	July 17, 2019
3	"Ghosts of Cybertron, Part 3"	Erik Burnham	Dan Schoening	Luis Antonio Delgado	Tom B. Long	August 7, 2019
4	"Ghosts of Cybertron, Part 4"	Erik Burnham	Dan Schoening	Luis Antonio Delgado	Tom B. Long	September 4, 2019
5	"Ghosts of Cybertron, Part 5"	Erik Burnham	Dan Schoening	Luis Antonio Delgado	Tom B. Long	October 2, 2019

== Reception ==
Issue #	Publication date	Critic rating	Critic reviews	Ref.
1	June 26, 2019	8.1/10	10	
2	July 17, 2019	9.4/10	1	
3	August 7, 2019	8.2/10	4	
4	September 4, 2019	8.6/10	2	
5	October 2, 2019	7.5/10	4	
Overall		8.4/10	21	

== Collected editions ==
Title	Material collected	Publication date	ISBN
Transformers/Ghostbusters: Ghosts of Cybertron	Transformers/Ghostbusters #1−5	March 4, 2020	1684056209, 978-1684056200
