= Meal (graphic novel) =

2018 graphic novel

- Date: October 1, 2018
- Publisher: Iron Circus Comics

Creative team
- Writers: Blue Delliquanti and Soleil Ho
- Artist: Blue Delliquanti
- ISBN: 978-1945820304

Meal is a graphic novel by Blue Delliquanti and Soleil Ho. It was published in 2018 by Iron Circus Comics, and follows a young chef who learns to cook using insects.

== Plot ==
Yarrow, a young chef in California seeking to bring entomophagy - insect-eating - to the mainstream, hopes to work at the soon-to-open restaurant La Casa Chictana. Yarrow proves herself to La Casa Chictana's owner Chandra Flores, who worries Yarrow only views cooking with insects as a novelty, and pursues a lesbian relationship with her neighbor Milani.

== Development ==
Delliquanti had been working on the book on their own prior to reaching out to Ho in 2017 to suggest their collaboration. Ho contributed to the research behind the work and some of its writing, with all illustration by Delliquanti. It was first published by Iron Circus Comics on October 1, 2018.

== Reception ==
In a starred review, School Library Journal said the plot combines a "sophisticated narrative with knowledge of restaurant politics, food history, and cultural views about insect-eating around the world", and compared Meal to the works of Grace Ellis, John Allison, and ND Stevenson. Publishers Weekly called the book "an enticing introduction to a less-traveled area of cuisine", and commented on the inclusion of recipes on the back of the book.

Avery Kaplan of The Beat discussed how the book portrays the relationship between food and culture, noting how Yarrow's desire to cook with insects ties back to childhood memories of searching for grasshoppers with her grandmother and how Chandra used entomophagy to connect with her Cambodian culture as a refugee to the United States, and concluded that "Meal demonstrates that food is a multifaceted and meaningful avenue for forging connections and community by showing how a queer relationship is formed and strengthened over shared meals."

=== Accolades ===
Year	Award/Honor	Result	Ref.
2019	Prism Award for Best Comic from a Small to Midsize	Won	
2018	Virginia Library Association Graphic Novel Diversity Award - Youth	Won	
