= Niki Smith =

American author

Niki Smith is an American author and cartoon artist. Her books include The Deep & Dark Blue (2020), The Golden Hour (2021) and Midsummer Sisters (2026), among others. The Deep & Dark Blue was a finalist for the 2021 Lambda Literary Award for Children's and Young Adult Literature, and Crossplay was a finalist for the 2019 Lambda Literary Award for Erotica.

Although Smith was raised in Kansas, as of 2026, she lives with her wife in Germany.

== Select works ==
=== The Deep & Dark Blue (2020) ===
The Deep & Dark Blue is Smith's debut middle-grade graphic novel, published January 7, 2020, by Little, Brown Books for Young Readers. The novel centers twins Hawke and Grayce as they escape from their cousin Mirelle, who has staged a coup in their kingdom. The twins seek refuge with the Communion of Blue, where Grayce finds comfort, though Hawke becomes restless. The story features Grayce coming out as transgender.

The Deep & Dark Blue was well received by critics, including a starred review from Kirkus Reviews and School Library Journal, with Kirkus naming it one of the best middle grade books of 2020. In 2021, the American Library Association included it among the top ten on their Rainbow Book List, and the Young Adult Library Services Association named it among the year's Great Graphic Novels for Teens. It was also shortlisted for the 2021 Lambda Literary Award for Children's and Young Adult Literature.

=== The Golden Hour (2021) ===
The Golden Hour is a middle-grade graphic novel published November 23, 2021, by Little, Brown and Company. The novel was a finalist for the 2022 Kirkus Prize for Young Readers' Literature.

=== Midsummer Sisters (2026) ===
Midsummer Sisters is a middle-grade graphic novel published June 9, 2026, by Graphix.

== Publications ==
=== Adult novels ===
- Smith, Niki (2018). Crossplay. Iron Circus. ISBN 978-1-945820-14-4.

=== Children's novels ===
- Smith, Niki (2020). The Deep & Dark Blue. Little, Brown and Co. ISBN 978-0-316-48598-2.
- Smith, Niki (2021). The Golden Hour. Little, Brown and Co. ISBN 978-1-546-12894-6.
- Garcia, Karina; Panetta, Kevin (2023). Slime Shop. Illustrated by Niki Smith. Versify. ISBN 978-0-358-44645-3.
- Vaughn, Sarah (2023). Ruined. Pencils and colors by Sarah Winifred Searle, with inks and flats by Niki Smith. First Second. ISBN 978-1-250-76935-0.
- Bakes, Julie (2025). Sea Legs. Illustrated by Niki Smith. Graphix. ISBN 978-1-338-83586-1.
- Smith, Niki (2026). Midsummer Sisters. Graphix. ISBN 978-1-546-12894-6.

=== Short story collections ===
- Your Hair (2012)

=== Anthologies ===
- Yuri Monogatari: Volume 5 (2007)
- Best Erotic Comics 2009 (2009)
- Smut Peddler (2014)
- Beyond: the Queer Sci-Fi & Fantasy Comic Anthology (2015)
- Love in All Forms: The Big Book of Growing Up Queer (2015)
- Food Porn: A Recipe for Pure Delight (2016)
- Enough Space for Everyone Else (2017)
- Mine!: A Comics Collection to Benefit Planned Parenthood (2017)
- Oh Joy Sex Toy, Vol. 4 (2017)
- Score!: A Hot Line-up of Erotic Sports Comics (2018)
- Come Together: A European Anthology of Erotic Comics (2019)
