= Slow Wave =

Comic strip by Jesse Reklaw

Slow Wave was a weekly comic strip by Jesse Reklaw. It syndicated to alternative newspapers around the U.S. starting in 1995, and also appeared online. Slow Wave changed style twice since its inception, and ended publication in 2012.

== Description ==
From 1995 to 2011 the strip was a collective dream diary authored by people from around the world. Readers would submit their dreams to the artist and were credited as authors of the resulting cartoon. Reklaw illustrated each dream in four panels, paring down the dreamer's commentary to a few sentences. Reklaw has said he likes dreams because they have "their own logic and a natural Dada-like humor." The strip's name refers to the EEG rhythms of REM sleep.

== Publication history ==
From 1995 to 2009, each episode of the strip would illustrate a dream by a single reader. The strip took the form of two rows of two panels.

In 2009 Reklaw introduced continuity into the strip, with characters encountering situations based on the dreams submitted by the readers. Individual strips would sometimes depict a mixture of dreams by different readers, and situations introduced in one episode sometimes persisted into the next. The strip also changed format to a horizontal arrangement of panels.

In January 2012 Reklaw ceased illustrating dreams for the strip and switched to a fictional continuity. Soon afterward the strip ended.

== Collections ==
The anthology Dreamtoons collects 109 episodes from the first five years of the strip.

- Dreamtoons. Shambhala Press, 2000. ISBN 1-57062-573-5
- The Night Of Your Life. Dark Horse Press 2008. ISBN 978-1-59582-183-6

== See also ==
- Dream art
