= Jesse Reklaw =

American cartoonist (born 1971)

- Reklaw, photographed at the 2004 Alternative Press Expo (APE) in San Francisco.
- Born: Jesse Walker; 1971 (age 54–55) Berkeley, California
- Areas: Cartoonist, Penciller
- Notable works: Slow Wave
- Awards: Society of Professional Journalists (Northern California chapter) — Excellence in Journalism Award, 2004; Association of Alternative Newsweeklies, 2001, 2003, 2004; Ignatz Award, 2008

Jesse Reklaw (born 1971) is an American cartoonist and painter, author of the syndicated dream-based comic strip Slow Wave.

== Biography ==
Reklaw was born in Berkeley, California and grew up in Sacramento, studied at UC Santa Cruz, and completed a master's degree in computer science at Yale University. In 1995, while pursuing a Ph.D. in artificial intelligence, he began self-publishing comics in his dream-themed series Concave Up. At the same time, he developed the weekly strip Slow Wave; when he began to have some success in syndicating it, he dropped out of Yale to work as a cartoonist. He lives in Portland, Oregon with his cat, Littles, who appears in many of his strips and zines.

== Slow Wave ==
Slow Wave is "a collective dream diary authored by people from around the world." Readers email their dreams to Reklaw, who illustrates them in a classic four panel cartoon which credits the dreamer as co-author. Reklaw pares down each dream he selects to a few sentences. Reklaw has said he likes dreams because they have "their own logic and a natural dada-like humor." Examples of Slow Wave stories include one in which "a man is pursued by an all-knowing ham"; one in which "the Royal Hole in the Earth Society discusses an award for the best hole filled with water"; and "one about a man who rode a unicorn to distant mountaintops in search of the world's only bathroom".

Slow Wave has been published in alternative newspapers and on the web since 1995. An anthology of Slow Wave strips was published in the book Dreamtoons. Slow Wave has also been published in Dream Time, the newsletter of the Association of the Study of Dreams, and two Slow Wave strips appeared in the textbook Introduction to Psychology, 5E by James Kalat, published by Brooks/Cole.

== Other works ==
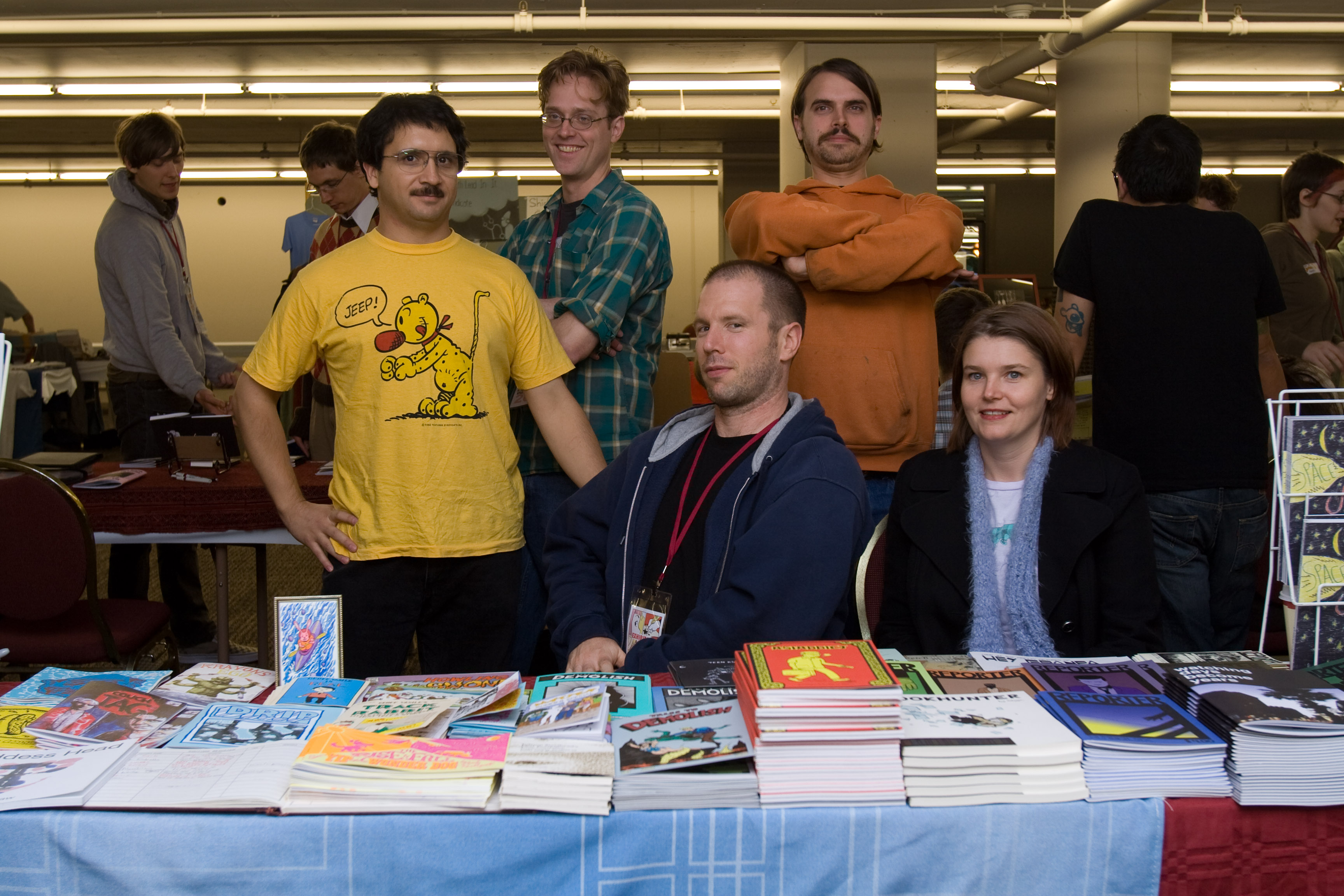
Chris Cilla, Reklaw, Dylan Williams, Tim Goodyear, and Andrice Arp at the Stumptown Comics Festival in 2007.

Reklaw's work has frequently appeared in small-press anthologies and self-published minicomics, many of which are available through the small-press comics distributor Global Hobo, which he co-operates. He is also the designer and editor of a small found object art book, Applicant, which reproduces photographs and descriptions of graduate school applicants in the 1970s.

Reklaw maintains the ethics of the early indie zine and mail art traditions, and has been known to send strangers free mini-comics in envelopes decorated with "crazy fish stamps." Reklaw is currently writing an autobiographical graphic novel called Couchtag, an excerpt of which, 13 Cats, was published in Houghton Mifflin's Best American Comics 2006.

In 1992, Reklaw was in a band called Pissant with fellow cartoonist Adrian Tomine.

== Awards ==
In 2004, Reklaw won an Excellence in Journalism Award from the Northern California chapter of the Society of Professional Journalists for his regular publication of Slow Wave in the East Bay Express, and he received awards from the Association of Alternative Newsweeklies in 2001, 2003, and 2004 for Slow Wave, including "Best cartoon" and "Format buster."

Reklaw has been nominated five times for an Ignatz Award: Outstanding Online Comic in 2003 (Slow Wave), and Outstanding Minicomic in 2001 (Mime Compliant #5), 2003 (Lo-Horse, with David Lasky), and 2005 (Couch Tag #2). In 2008, he won the Ignatz Award for Outstanding Minicomic for (Bluefuzz The Hero).

== Works ==
Books

- Keeping Score, Fantagraphics Underground, 2019 ISBN 978-1-68396-301-1
- Lovf: An Illustrated Vision Quest of a Man Losing His Mind, Fantagraphics Books Inc., 2016 ISBN 978-1-60699-937-0
- Couch Tag, Fantagraphics Books Inc., 2013 ISBN 978-1-60699-676-8
- Ten Thousand Things to Do, Microcosm Publishing, 2010
- The Night of Your Life, Dark Horse Books, 2008 ISBN 978-1-59582-183-6
- Applicant, Microcosm Publishing, 2006 ISBN 0-9770557-6-0 (previously self-published)
- Dreamtoons, Shambhala Press, 2000 ISBN 1-57062-573-5

Comic book series

- Couch Tag #1-3, 2004–2006, self-published minicomics
- Concave Up #1-6, self-published

== See also ==
- The Comics Interpreter
- Dream art
