= Connie Wilkins =

American author of lesbian-themed science fiction and fantasy erotica

Connie Wilkins (who often uses the pseudonym Sacchi Green) is an American author of lesbian themed science fiction and fantasy erotica published under the title Wild Flesh. Wilkins is based in Massachusetts.

== Personal life ==
Connie Wilkins' father served in the Army Air Corps during WWII. He wanted to be a pilot, but due to inner ear damage resulting from a childhood infection he was unqualified for the position. In the late 1960s Connie was married to a man in the Navy with whom she had a child. After a six-month patrol in the Antarctic, he was stationed in San Francisco on instructor duty until he was discharged. Connie was inclined to join the anti-war protests that occurred by the time he was discharged from the service.

== Career ==
Connie Wilkins first qualified as an active member of the SFWA (Science Fiction and Fantasy Writers of America) selling various science fiction and fantasy short stories. Writing primarily for children, she decided to use the pseudonym Sacchi Green when selling her first erotica story to Best Lesbian Erotica in 1999. Her primary goal was to write stories primarily for children, however, she soon found herself almost completely focused on writing erotic stories as Sacchi Green. After years of writing her own stories and collecting submissions from other authors, she decided to focus more on editorial work, which remains her focus to this day.

=== Lambda Awards ===
Under her pseudonym Sacchi Green, Connie Wilkins has won two Lambda Literary Awards and received several nominations within the Lesbian Erotica Category. These works are listed as follows:

18th LLA for Lesbian Erotica (Nominated 2006) Rode Hard But Away Wet: Lesbian Cowboy Erotica, co-edited by Sacchi Green and Rakelle Valencia, published by Suspect Thoughts

21st LLA for Lesbian Erotica (Nominated 2009) Lipstick on Her Collar by Sacchi Green, published by Pretty Things Press

22nd LLA for Lesbian Erotica (Won 2010) - Lesbian Cowboys, co-edited by Sacchi Green and Rakelle Valencia, published by Cleis Press

24th LLA for Lesbian Erotica (Nominated 2012) Lesbian Cops: Erotic Investigations, co-edited by Sacchi Green and Rakelle Valencia, published by Cleis Press (Nominated 2012) A Ride to Remember & Other Erotic Tales by Sacchi Green, published by Lethe Press

26th LLA for Lesbian Erotica (Won 2014)- Wild Girls Wild Nights: True Lesbian Sex Stories, edited by Sacchi Green and published by Cleis Press

== List of works ==
=== Connie Wilkins ===
- Freedom
- Healer
- Madly Deeply
- Meluse's Counsel
- One-Eyed Jack
- Pocket Apollo
- Steelwing
- Ten Thousand Miles
- The Bridge
- The Heart of the Storm
- The Windskimmer
- Time Well Bent: Queer Alternative Histories
- Virtual Empathy

=== Sacchi Green ===
- A Ride to Remember & Other Erotic Tales
- Best Lesbian Erotica of the Year, Vol. 1
- Flesh and Stone
- Freeing the Demon
- Girl Crazy: Coming Out Erotica
- Girl Fever: 69 Stories of Sudden Sex for Lesbians
- Hard Road, Easy Riding: Lesbian Biker Erotica
- Jessabel
- Lesbian Cops: Erotic Investigations
- Lesbian Cowboys: Erotic Adventures
- Lipstick on Her Collar
- Me and My Boi: Queer Erotic Stories
- Rode Hard But Away Wet: Lesbian Cowboy Erotica
- Spirit House Ranch
- The Dragon Descending
- Wild Girls Wild Nights: True Lesbian Sex Stories
- Women With Handcuffs: Lesbian Cop Erotica

== See also ==
- Cleis Press
- Lesbian fiction
- List of lesbian science fiction
- Lambda Literary Award
- Science Fiction and Fantasy Writers of America
