= Dicebox =

Science fiction webcomic by Jenn Manley Lee

- Author: Jenn Manley Lee
- Website: http://www.dicebox.net/
- Current status/schedule: Irregular, biweekly, planned weekly
- Genre: Science fiction

Molly and Griffen, protagonists of Dicebox by Jenn Manley Lee

Dicebox, by American cartoonist Jenn Manley Lee, is a science fiction webcomic which has been hosted at the subscription-based comics anthology site Girlamatic. The comic, planned for four books totalling 36 chapters, is set in the space-travelling future and is primarily the story of one year in the lives of two women factory workers, Griffen Medea Stoyka and Molly Robbins.

Manley Lee's work on Dicebox made her a finalist for the Friends of Lulu's Kimberly Yale Award for Best New Talent for 2003. The Oregonian calls Dicebox the "gravitational center" of Oregon's "vibrant Web-comic scene". Dicebox is also on comic scholar Scott McCloud's top 20 webcomics list, and was used along with Penny Arcade, Fetus-X and Questionable Content as an example of comics using the web to create "an explosion of diverse genres and styles" in McCloud's 2006 book Making Comics.

The title dicebox is a reference to the peorth rune, which in divination systems may represent 'dice cup' or 'womb', symbolizing "something revealed that had been hidden, though it can also stand for a gamepiece or a pawn".
