= Ghostbusters: Back in Town =

2024 comic book series

- Cover art.

Publication information
- Publisher: Dark Horse Comics
- Genre: Supernatural fiction
- Publication date: March 27, 2024 — June 26, 2024
- No. of issues: 4
- Main character: Ghostbusters (Columbia Pictures)

Creative team
- Written by: Greg Pak (1); David M. Booher
- Penciller: Blue Delliquanti
- Letterer: Jimmy Betancourt
- Colorist(s): Mildred Louis (1–3); Cris Peter (4)

Ghostbusters: Back in Town is an American limited comic book series published in 2024 by Dark Horse Comics. The series is set between Ghostbusters: Afterlife and Ghostbusters: Frozen Empire. The series was released as a trade paperback on October 30, 2024.

== Synopsis ==
Set after the defeat of Gozer the Gozerian in Ghostbusters: Afterlife and before Ghostbusters: Dead Man's Chest, Ghostbusters: Back in Town follows the Spengler family as they travel to New York City and move into the Ghostbusters firehouse.

=== Main characters ===
- Gary Grooberson: A science teacher and a seismologist who was briefly possessed by Vinz Clortho the Keymaster and was present during the defeat of Gozer the Gozerian.
- Callie Spengler: The daughter of Dr. Egon Spengler who was briefly possessed by Zuul the Gatekeeper and was present during the defeat of Gozer the Gozerian.
- Trevor Spengler: A grandchild of Dr. Egon Spengler who was present during the defeat of Gozer the Gozerian.
- Phoebe Spengler: A grandchild of Dr. Egon Spengler who was present during the defeat of Gozer the Gozerian.
- Winston Zeddemore: A Ghostbuster and the head of Zeddemore Industries who was present during the defeat of Gozer the Gozerian and Vigo the Carpathian.
- Ray Stantz: A Ghostbuster who was present during the defeat of Gozer the Gozerian and Vigo the Carpathian.

== Issues ==
Issue #	Title	Written by	Drawn by	Colored by	Lettered by	Publication date
1	"Ghostbusters: Back in Town #1"	Greg Pak and David M. Booher	Blue Delliquanti	Mildred Louis	Jimmy Betancourt	March 27, 2024
2	"Ghostbusters: Back in Town #2"	David M. Booher	Blue Delliquanti	Mildred Louis	Jimmy Betancourt	April 24, 2024
3	"Ghostbusters: Back in Town #3"	David M. Booher	Blue Delliquanti	Mildred Louis	Jimmy Betancourt	May 29, 2024
4	"Ghostbusters: Back in Town #4"	David M. Booher	Blue Delliquanti	Cris Peter	Jimmy Betancourt	June 26, 2024
