= Soleil Ho =

American food writer and podcaster

Soleil Ho (born 1987 or 1988) is an American chef, food writer, podcaster, and restaurant critic. They were formerly co-host of the podcast The Racist Sandwich.

Ho became the food critic at the San Francisco Chronicle in 2019, replacing Michael Bauer. Ho left the position in 2023, becoming a part of the Chronicle's opinion desk. Ho was awarded the James Beard Award for Criticism in 2022, and was nominated for the same award in 2020 and 2023.

== Early life and education ==
Born into a Vietnamese-American family in rural Illinois, Ho was raised in the East Side of Manhattan, New York at age 8 with their mother Francie, who worked in the fashion industry, and their sister.

They grew up in all over both Brooklyn, New York and Manhattan, which includes Williamsburg, Brooklyn. They graduated from Stuyvesant High School in 2005. Ho graduated from Grinnell College in 2009.

== Career ==
As a chef, Ho has worked at restaurants in New Orleans, Minneapolis, Portland, Oregon, and Puerto Vallarta, where their mother owned a restaurant.

Ho and journalist Zahir Janmohamed launched a podcast titled Racist Sandwich about under-reported issues in the food industry in 2016; one of their listeners, artist and writer Blue Delliquanti, collaborated with them on the 2017 graphic novel MEAL about "eating bugs, queer desire, and opening a restaurant".

In 2019, they replaced Michael Bauer, who retired after 32 years as the restaurant critic for the San Francisco Chronicle. Ho has joked that Bauer, their predecessor at the newspaper, held the job since they were "not even a fetus". In their first year, they produced a new methodology for the Chronicle's listicles, prioritizing diversity, affordability and localness, detailing ADA compliance and plant-based options, using public transportation, and eliminating starred reviews.

== Literary works ==
Ho is careful about the connotations of the words they select. A specific example is that they do not use the term "kaffir lime" because kaffir is a racial slur in South Africa. More generally, they do not think that "ethnic" food is a legitimate concept. Ho says "The imprecision of the word—and the assumption that it doesn’t apply equally to people and cuisines associated with Europe or white America—gives me such a headache." They consider terms like "sustainable," "responsibly grown" and "farm-to-table" to be marketing buzzwords that are too often abused. Ho is especially critical of gentrification in their writing, expressing concern that food writing can function as "the language of real estate marketing".

Ho mentions poet and essayist Hanif Abdurraqib, food critic Ruth Reichl and newspaper critic-at-large Wesley Morris as among their influences. Ho says that they want to write about restaurants that "tell a story" which may focus on "race, gender, class or the culture of the Bay Area".

Ho and journalist Zahir Janmohamed launched a podcast titled Racist Sandwich about under-reported issues in the food industry in 2016; one of their listeners, Blue Delliquanti, co-authored a graphic novel titled Meal with them the next year. The book is described as a "graphic novel on culinary mentorship, queer romance, and eating insects".

Concerned about their legacy in a high-profile position, Ho commented, "What if I screw up and no one ever hires a queer woman of color for a role like this again?"
