= List of Xeric grant winners =

This is a list of cartoonists awarded a grant from the Xeric Foundation, allowing them to self-publish their comics. The awards are broken down by year and grant cycle (March and September). In addition, recent years' awards list the total amount awarded during the respective grant cycle. The awards were granted from 1992–2012.

== Winners ==
=== 1992 ===
September

- Robert Eaton for King Philip's War
- Michael Kasper for "All Cotton Briefs"
- Jeff Nicholson for Lost Laughter
- Wayne Wise and Fred Wheaton for Grey Legacy

=== 1993 ===
March

- Stephen Blue for Red River
- Megan Kelso for Girlhero
- David Lasky for Boom Boom

September

- Jon Lewis for True Swamp
- Jason Lutes for Jar of Fools
- Greg Moutafis for Killer Ape
- Adrian Tomine for Optic Nerve

=== 1994 ===
March

- Scott Getchell for Ritchie Kill'd My Toads
- Tom Hart for Hutch Owen's Working Hard
- Garret Izumi for Strip Down
- Stephen Townsend for The Hood: A Change from Within

September

- Kevin Dixon & Eric Knisley for Mickey Death
- David Tompkins & Jeff Tompkins for Health
- Bebe Williams/Art Comics Daily for Bobby Ruckers
- Jonathan Rimorin & Yong Yi for When My Brother Was God

=== 1995 ===
March

- Kris Dresen and Jen Benka for Manya
- Scott Gilbert (comics) for It's All True
- Andy Hartzell for Bread & Circuses
- Mike Macropoulos for Super Soul Puddin' Comics
- Randy Reynaldo for The Rob Hanes Archives

September

- Jessica Abel for Artbabe
- Art Baxter for SPUD
- Clay Butler for Sidewalk Bubblegum
- David Kelly for Steven's Comics
- Tom Pappalardo for Alec Dear (with Matt Smith)
- David Yurkovich for Death by Chocolate

=== 1996 ===
March

- Warren Craghead for Speedy
- Walt Holcombe for The King of Persia
- Linda Medley for Castle Waiting
- James Sturm for The Revival

September

- Thomas Galambos for from Hungary
- John Kerschbaum for The Wiggly Reader
- Steve Matuszak for Most Likely to Succeed
- Rafael Navarro for Sonambulo: Sleep of the Just
- Steven Peters for Awakening Comics
- Christine Shields for Blue Hole

=== 1997 ===
March

- Ellen Forney for I Was Seven in '75
- Jim Ottaviani for Two-Fisted Science
- Rhyan Scorpio-Rhys for Sofa Jet City Crisis
- Henry Wolyniec for Wahh
- Gene Yang for Gordon Yamamoto and the King of the Geeks

September

- Fawn Gehweiler for Bomb Pop
- Fred Hofheinz for Paper & Binding
- Robert Kirby for Curbside
- Kevin Quigley for Big Place Comics
- Sarah Thornton for Lumpophilia

=== 1998 ===
March

- Aaron Augenblick for Tales from the Great Unspoken
- Leesa Dean for Chilltown
- Alejandro Fuentes for Grasa del Sol
- Anson Jew for Saturday Nite
- Jason Little for Jack's Luck Runs Out
- Gareth Hinds for Bearskin
- Jay Hosler for Clan Apis: Transitions

September

- Don Bethman Jr. for Paper Cinema
- Dawn Brown for Little Red Hot
- Joe Chiapetta for A Death in the Family
- Scott Mills for Cells
- Olivia Schanzer for Fragile Honeymoon
- Dylan Williams for Reporter

=== 1999 ===
March

- Shane Amaya for Roland: Days of Wrath
- Shannon Brady for Marco Solo
- David Choe for Slow Jams
- Carrie Golus for Alternator
- Rhode Montijo for Pablo's Inferno
- Matthew Oreto for Sky & Mephistopheles
- Jason Sandberg for Jupiter

September

- Nick Bertozzi for Boswash
- Leela Corman for Queen's Day
- Marcel Guldemond for Under a Slowly Spinning Sun
- Mark Price for Arm's Length
- Thomas Scioli for The Myth of 8-Opus
- Jason Shiga for Double Happiness
- Michael Teague for epic dermis

=== 2000 ===
March

- Seth Berkowitz for Best Western
- Robyn Chapman for Theater of the Meek
- Farel Dalrymple for Pop-Gun War
- Rachel Masilamani for RPM Comics
- William Morton (cartoonist) for Cynical Girl
- Anders Nilsen for The Ballad of the Two-Headed Boy
- John Pham for Epoxy
- Daniel Way for Violent Lifestyle Vol. 1
- Danijel Zezelj for Air Mexico

September

- Santiago Cohen for The Fifth Name
- Friends of Lulu for Friends of Lulu: Storytime
- Julian Lawrence for Drippytown Comics #2001
- Michael Neno for Michael Neno’s Reactionary Tales
- Frederick Noland for Schpilkes
- Leland Purvis for VOX
- Jen Sorensen for Slowpoke: Cafe Pompous
- Gia-Bao Tran for Content
- Daniel Warner for A Bright Sunny Day

=== 2001 ===
March

- Philip Bourassa for First World
- Ben Catmull for Paper Theater
- Jordan Crane for Col-Dee
- Brian Ralph for Climbing Out
- Jacob Weinstein for Dirty Boxes
- Kurt Wolfgang for Where Hats Go

September

- Justin Hall for A Sacred Text
- Rachel Hartman for Amy Unbounded: Belondweg Blossoming
- Gerald Jablonski for Cryptic Wit
- Troy Little for Chiaroscuro
- Songgu Kwon for Blanche the Baby Killer
- Hans Rickheit for CHLOE
- Michael Slack for Land of O
- Dennis Tucker for Tales from Birdbun Theatre

=== 2002 ===
March

- Donna Barr for Seven Peaches: The First Seven Desert Peach Episodes
- Nikki Coffman and Laurenn McCubbin for XXX Live Nude Girls
- Toc Fetch for The Tenacious Facts of Life of a Noman, Toc Fetch
- Richard Hahn for Lumakick
- Kenjji for Witch Doctor
- Jai Sen for Garlands of Moonlight

September

- Sam Hiti for End Times: Tiempos Finales
- Derek Kirk Kim for Same Difference and Other Stories
- Sonny Liew for Malinky Robot: Stinky Fish Blues
- Henrik Rehr for Tuesday
- Lauren Weinstein for Inside Vineyland

=== 2003 ===
March

- Jef Czekaj for Grampa and Julie Shark Hunters
- John Hankiewicz for Tepid
- Jai Nitz for Paper Museum
- Bishakh Som for Angel
- Elena Steier for The Revenge of the Vampire Bed and Breakfast
- Julie Yeh for Poppie's Adventures: Serpents in Paradise

September

- Alex Fellows for Canvas
- Jay Hacker for Headstatic
- Jon "Bean" Hastings, editor, for Spark Generators II
- Neil Kleid for Ninety Candles
- Joel Rivers for Along the Canadian
- Leslie Stein for Yeah, It Is!
- Michael Zittel for Master Catfish

=== 2004 ===
March ($24,889)

- Mark Britt for Full Color
- James Campbell for Krachmacher
- Leland Myrick for Bright Elegy
- Josh Neufeld for A Few Perfect Hours
- Karl Stevens for Guilty
- Ivan Velez for The Collected Tales of the Closet, vol. I

September ($27,765)

- Andrew Drozd for Coexisting
- Ryan Dunlavey and Fred Van Lente for Action Philosophers!
- David Heatley for Deadpan #2
- Nicholas Jeffrey for Centerfield
- Craig Hurd-McKenney and Rick Geary for The Brontes: Infernal Angria #1
- Fay Ryu for HELLO
- Rob Sato for Burying Sandwiches

=== 2005 ===
March ($29,270)

- Emily Benz and Summer McClinton for Thread
- Alex Cahill for Something So Familiar
- Zack Gardner for Fauna
- Debbie Huey for Bumper Boy Loses His Marbles
- Michael LaRiccia for Black Mane
- Jeff Lemire for Lost Dogs
- Jesse Moynihan for The Backwards Folding Mirror

September ($28,191)

- Catherine Hannah for Winter Beard
- Lance Christian Hansen for Don’t Cry
- Melody Shickley for In the Hands of Boys
- Albert Benjamin Thompson for HUSK

=== 2006 ===
March ($21,406)

- Gregory Corso for And How
- Toc Fetch for Kids of Lower Utopia, vol. 6, no. 1 "Of Softdoor Scout Finnagain and Daffodil Dash Eleven"
- Joshua Hagler for The Boy Who Made Silence
- Aron Nels Steinke for Big Plans
- James Vining for First in Space — book was chosen for publication by Oni Press just before Vining received Xeric acceptance letter. Therefore, Vining declined the grant money, but is still considered a Xeric winner.
- Joel White for Bronzeville

September ($27,598)

- Emily Blair for Living Statues
- Alexis Frederick-Frost for La Primavera
- Joshua Kemble for NUMB
- Jason McNamara and Tony Talbert for First Moon
- Nate Neal for The Sanctuary
- Pat Palermo for Cut Flowers
- Mark Price for Consider Everything in Bad Shape

=== 2007 ===
March ($24,501)

- Kevin Colden for Fishtown — Colden opted to publish his book online, with the webcomics collective, ACT-I-VATE, and declined the grant money, but is still considered a Xeric winner.
- Erik Evensen for Gods of Asgard
- Sam Gaskin for Pizza Wizard #1
- Steve MacIsaac for Shirtlifter #2
- Tyler Page for Nothing Better
- Jeremy Smith for Ropeburn
- Ryan Alexander for Tanner - Television #1

September ($26,548)

- Colleen Frakes for Tragic Relief
- Geoff Grogan for Look Out! Monsters!
- Lars Martinson for Tonoharu: Part One
- Corinne Mucha for My Alaskan Summer
- Jaime "Jimmy" Portillo for Gabriel

=== 2008 ===
May ($51,494)

- Gary Scott Beatty for Jazz: Cool Birth
- Marek Bennett for Breakfast at Mimi's Doughnuts
- Eroyn Franklin for Another Glorious Day at the Nothing Factory
- Jason Hoffman for Mine
- Jack Hsu for 8-9-3
- Jenny Jaeckel for Spot 12
- Dave Kiersh for Dirtbags, Mall Chicks and Motorbikes
- Alex Kim for Wall City
- stef lenk for TeaTime
- Justin Murphy for Cleburne
- Felix Tannenbaum for The Chronicles of Some Made

November ($25,031)

- Box Brown for Love is a Peculiar Type of Thing
- Ed Choy Moorman for editing/compiling Ghost Comics: A Benefit Anthology for RS Eden — Featuring Kevin Cannon, Evan Palmer, Will Dinski from the Twin Cities comics scene, as well as Jeffrey Brown and Ed Choy Moorman himself. The anthology was created as a fundraiser for the RS Eden foundation for healthy Minnesota communities.
- Annie Murphy for I Still Live: Biography of a Spiritualist
- Ethan Rilly for Pope Hats
- Sophia Wiedeman for The Deformitory
- J.T. Yost for Old Man Winter & Other Sordid Tales

=== 2009 ===
May ($22,002)

- Joe Boruchow for Stuffed Animals: A Story in Paper Cutouts
- Adam Bourret for I’m Crazy
- Timothy Godek for !
- Adam Hines for Duncan the Wonder Dog
- Joshua Smeaton for Haunted

November ($32,042)

- Sarah Becan for The Complete and Definitive Ouija Interviews
- Bryan G. Brown for First Fight
- Sixta C. for Soldiers of God
- Ben Costa for Shi Long Pang, The Wandering Shaolin Monk
- Blaise Larmee for Young Lions
- Lane Milburn for Death Trap
- Stefan Salinas for Within the Rat
- Nathan Schreiber for Power Out

=== 2010 ===
May ($32,761)

- Margaret Ashford-Trotter for Thunder in the Building #2
- Jason Brubaker for reMIND
- Jonathon Dalton for Lords of Death and Life
- Wei Li for Lotus Root Children
- Jed McGowan for Lone Pine
- Ansis Purins for Zombre #2: The Magic Forest
- Brittney Sabo and Anna Bratton for Francis Sharp in the Grip of the Uncanny! Book 1

November ($31,158)

- Brendan Leach for The Pterodactyl Hunters (in the Guilded City)
- Steve LeCouilliard for Much the Miller's Son
- Nick Maandag for Streakers
- John Martz for Heaven All Day
- Melissa Mendes for Freddy Stories
- Kevin Mutch for Fantastic Life
- Benjamin Rivers for Snow

=== 2011 ===
May ($29,000)

- Seamus Heffernan for Freedom
- Bernard Edward Mireault for To Get Her
- Sam Spina for Fight
- Breena Wiederhoeft for Picket Line

=== 2012 ===
July ($74,510)

- Liz Plourde and Randy Michaels for How i Made the World
- Laurianne Uy for Polterguys
- Max Badger for "Oak"
- Arwen Donahue for "Old Man Gloom"
- Marnie Galloway for "In The Sounds and Seas: Vol. 1"
- Olivia Horvath for "Tiny Bangs"
- Aidan Koch for "The Blonde Woman"
- John Malta for "The Professor and The Paperboy"
- Hazel Newlevant for "Ci Vediamo"
- Shih-Mu Dino Pai for "Dear Beloved Stranger"
- Benjamin Seto for "Usagi Jane and The Skullbunnies"
- Darin Shuler for "Castle and Wood"
- Caitlin Skaalrud for "Sea Change: A Choose-Your-Own-Way Story"
- Bernard Stiegler for "The Reptile Mind"
- Laura Terry for "Overboard"
- Elaine M. Will for Look Straight Ahead
- M. Young for "Wild Child"
