= Erik Evensen =

American Illustrator

Erik Evensen (born October 3, 1979) is an American illustrator and professor, known primarily for his work on the graphic novels Gods of Asgard (2007) and The Beast of Wolfe's Bay (2013), the comic series Ghostbusters and Back to the Future from IDW Publishing, and the board games Marrying Mr. Darcy and Distilled. Evensen received a Xeric Award comic book self-publishing grant in 2007. He is married to composer Erika Svanoe.

== Biography ==
Evensen was born and raised in Claremont, New Hampshire, where he attended Stevens High School. He received his B.A. from the University of New Hampshire in 2001, where he studied Studio Art. He received a Post-baccalaureate Certificate in Studio Art from the School of the Museum of Fine Arts at Tufts in 2005, and a Master of Fine Arts in Design from Ohio State University in 2009. During his early career, he worked as a graphic designer in New Hampshire at design agencies as well as PC Connection, and taught at York County Community College, Bemidji State University, and Ohio State University. While living in Dover, New Hampshire, he was active in a makeshift collaborative comics community, which he cites as the catalyst for his 2007 debut graphic novel, Gods of Asgard. Evensen has taught digital drawing, illustration, and concept art at the University of Wisconsin–Stout since 2013. He also teaches graduate classes in Design Research and Design Education and advises thesis projects.

== Selected bibliography ==
Comic books and graphic novels

- The Beast of Wolfe’s Bay (self-published, 2013) ISBN 9780989010405
- Gods of Asgard (self-published with a grant from the Xeric Foundation, 2007) (graphic novel) ISBN 978-0976902522
- Erik Evensen’s Sketchbook Diary: the complete series (Self-published, 2007) (trade paperback compilation) ISBN 9780989010412
- “Who is... the Electro-Lucha?” Johnny Raygun Quarterly (Jetpack Press, February 9, 2005) ISBN 9780989010412
- Ghostbusters: Interdimensional Cross-rip (hardcover collection), (IDW Publishing, Oct. 2017) ISBN 978-1631409608
- Ghostbusters International Volume 2 (trade paperback), (IDW Publishing, February 1, 2017) ISBN 9780989010412
- Ghostbusters Annual, (IDW Publishing, Jan. 2017)
- Ghostbusters International (vol. 3), issue 9, (IDW Publishing, Sep. 2016)
- Ghostbusters Annual, (IDW Publishing, Nov. 2015)
- Ghostbusters Volume 7: Happy Horror Days (trade paperback), (IDW Publishing, April 16, 2014) ISBN 9781613779323
- Ghostbusters (vol. 2), issue 12, Jan. 2014 (IDW Publishing, January 29, 2014)
- Back to the Future: The Heavy Collection (hardback), written by Bob Gale (IDW Publishing, November 27, 2018) ISBN 978-1684053506
- Back to the Future: Untold Tales and Alternate Timelines (trade paperback), written by Bob Gale (IDW Publishing, May 18, 2016) ISBN 978-1631405709
- “Emmett Brown Visits the Future,” Back to the Future: Untold Tales and Alternate Timelines, written by Bob Gale (IDW Publishing, issue 4, Jan. 2016)

Illustrated books

- Super-Powered Word Study, written by James Bucky Carter (Maupin House Publishing, Gainesville, FL, 2010) (educational workbook) ISBN 9781934338827
- The Devil’s Punch-Bowl, written by Isabelle Waterman (Dunn County Historical Society Press, 2017) ISBN 978-0-9769145-0-1
- Angrvadil, adapted by Edvard Eikill (Sagabok/Saga Publishers International, 2012) ISBN 9788291640587

Board games

- Distilled, by Dave Beck (Paverson Games, 2023)
- Marrying Mr. Darcy: The Pride and Prejudice Card Game, by Erika Svanoe (Erika Svanoe Games, 2013) ISBN 9780989010429

== Awards ==
- 2023 The Dice Tower Seal of Excellence for Distilled
- 2022 Outstanding Teaching Award at the University of Wisconsin–Stout
- 2021 Golden Meeple Award for Distilled
- 2007 Xeric Award for Gods of Asgard
