= Shutterbug =

Shutterbug may refer to:

- Shutterbug (magazine), a camera equipment magazine
- Shutterbug Follies, a 2002 graphic novel created by Jason Little
- A song by the band Veruca Salt on the album Eight Arms to Hold You
- "The Shutterbug", an episode of the children's animated television series Timothy Goes to School
- Shutterbug, a 1995 album by Thousand Foot Krutch
- "Shutterbugs", several episodes on the MTV sketch comedy show Human Giant
- Shutterbugs, a series broadcast by TVOKids from 2016 to 2020
- "Shutterbug", an episode of the TV series Pocoyo

== See also ==
- "Shutterbugg", a song by Big Boi on the album Sir Lucious Left Foot: The Son of Chico Dusty
