= Jack Hsu =

Jack Hsu may refer to:

- Jack Hsu (artist), American artist
- Jack Hsu (politician), incumbent Political Deputy Minister of Transportation and Communications of the Republic of China
