= Alternative Comics =

American independent graphic novel and comic book publisher

- Parent company: Wow Cool (2012–present)
- Founded: 1993
- Founder: Jeff Mason
- Defunct: 2020
- Country of origin: United States
- Headquarters location: Gainesville, Florida (1993–2012); Cupertino, California (2012–2020); Troy, New York (2024– )
- Distribution: Consortium Book Sales and Distribution
- Key people: Marc Arsenault
- Publication types: Comic books, graphic novels
- Fiction genres: Alternative
- Imprints: Sparkplug Books; Manx Media
- Official website: www.wowcool.com/collections/alternative-comics-comics

Alternative Comics was an American independent graphic novel and comic book publisher most recently based in Cupertino, California. In addition to publishing creator-owned titles, Alternative Comics was also a noted publisher of anthologies such as 9-11: Emergency Relief, Hi-Horse, Hickee, Rosetta, and True Porn.

== History ==
=== Jeff Mason era ===
Alternative Press, Inc. was founded in 1993 by Jeff Mason – while he was still a law student at the University of Florida — to publish Indy Magazine, a magazine devoted to small-label music and comics. (Indy was published in print form, with founder Dan DeBono, from 1993 to 1997 and revived as a digital magazine from 2004 to 2005).

In 1996, Mason made the decision to publish comics, specifically to give up-and-coming creators their first break in the industry. The company changed its name to Alternative Comics and began publishing such cartoonists as Steven Weissman, Ed Brubaker, and Sam Henderson. At this point, the company established its policy of giving creators "complete artistic and legal control of their work."

In 1999, Alternative Comics published Monica's Story, by James Kochalka and Tom Hart, which satirized the Starr Report's coverage of President Bill Clinton's affair with former White House intern Monica Lewinsky. Proceeds from Monica's Story benefitted the Comic Book Legal Defense Fund. The publisher also received mainstream notice for publishing 2001's Titans of Finance: True Tales of Money and Business, by R. Walker and Josh Neufeld; and 2002's 9-11: Emergency Relief, a post-9/11 benefit anthology.

In 2003–2004, the company expanded its offerings, debuting new ongoing titles by such cartoonists as Graham Annable, Scott Campbell, Nick Bertozzi, and Josh Neufeld, as well as a number of one-shots and graphic novels. Alternative faced a major financial challenge in 2004 as a result of the 2002 bankruptcy of the distributor LPC. The company scaled back its publication schedule and was forced to cancel a few titles.

Mason operated Alternative Comics from 1993 to 2008, when the company went defunct. Many of the company's titles during this period — including Magic Whistle, Bipolar, Rubber Necker, and the anthologies Rosetta and Hi-Horse — were nominated for major comics awards, including the Eisner, Harvey, and Ignatz.

=== Marc Arsenault era ===
In July 2012, it was announced that Alternative Comics was resuming operations under the new general manager Marc Arsenault, owner of the publisher/distributor Wow Cool, and moving to Cupertino, California. (Wow Cool had been formed in New York City in 1988 by Arsenault, Tom Hart, and Sam Henderson, so the company already had established relationships with a number of Alternative Comics' core cartoonists.)

In February 2015, Alternative Comics formed a distribution cooperative with the small publishers Floating World Comics, Hic and Hoc Publications, Revival House Press, Study Group Comics, Hang Dai Editions, and Steve Lafler/Manx Media. Dubbed the Alternative Comics Publishing Co-Op, the publishers agreed to have their titles listed in distribution catalogs under the Alternative Comics banner, thus giving the publishers access to distribution from Diamond Comic Distributors and Consortium Book Sales and Distribution. In addition, Alternative Comics announced it was reviving Indy Magazine (vol. 3).

When Sparkplug Comics shut down in June 2016, the company's backlist was moved to Alternative Comics.

The company again ceased its operations in the spring of 2020, with at least some of its former titles being distributed by Wow Cool.

In early June 2024, Wow Cool announced on Instagram that "Alternative Comics has landed in its third home of Troy, New York. Everything should be up and running by next week."

== Creators ==
Cartoonists who have published with Alternative include Graham Annable, Gabrielle Bell, Nick Bertozzi, Brandon Graham, Asaf Hanuka, Tomer Hanuka, Tom Hart, Dean Haspiel, Sam Henderson, James Kochalka, David Lasky, Jon Lewis, Matt Madden, Josh Neufeld, Dash Shaw, Jen Sorensen, and Sara Varon.

The company was also known as a distributor for Xeric Foundation award-winners, such as Leela Corman, Derek Kirk Kim, Neufeld, Bishakh Som, Sorensen, Karl Stevens, Lauren Weinstein, and many others.

== Ongoing or limited series ==
=== Jeff Mason era ===
- Alternative Comics anthology (2 issues, 2003–2004)
- Bipolar, by Asaf Hanuka, & Tomer Hanuka (5 issues, 2001–2004)
- Detour, by Ed Brubaker (1 issue, 1997)
- A Fine Mess, by Matt Madden (2 issues, 2002–2004)
- Hickee, by Graham Annable, Scott Campbell, Joe White, et al. (4 issues, 2003–2007)
- Humongous Man, by Dan Stepp and Jim Harrison (4 issues, 1997–1998)
- Magic Whistle, by Sam Henderson (11 issues, 1998–2008; continued by Arsenault)
- Peanutbutter & Jeremy, by James Kochalka (4 issues, 2001)
- The Power of 6, by Jon Lewis (1 issue, 2006)
- Rosetta: A Comics Anthology, edited by Ng Suat Tong (2 issues, 2003–2005)
- Rubber Necker, by Nick Bertozzi (4 issues, 2002–2004)
- Slowpoke, by Jen Sorensen (1 issues, 1998)
- A Sort of Homecoming, by Damon Hurd and Pedro Camello (3 issues, 2003–2007)
- Spectacles, by Jon Lewis (4 issues, 1997–1998)
- True Porn anthology (2 issues, 2003–2005)
- Urban Hipster, by David Lasky & Greg Stump (2 issues, 1998–2003)
- The Vagabonds, by Josh Neufeld (2 issues, 2003–2006)
- Yikes, by Steven Weissman (2 issues, 1997–1998)

=== Marc Arsenault era ===
- Death in Oaxaca, by Steve Lafler (3 issues, 2014–2015)
- Hawd Tales, by Devin Flynn (2 issues, 2014–2016)
- Injury, by Ted May, et al., (4 issues, 2012–2014)
- Irene anthology edited by Dakota McFadzean, Andy Warner, and dw (3 issues, 2014-2015)
- Magic Whistle, by Sam Henderson (4 issues, 2012–2015)
- Magic Whistle 3.0 by Sam Henderson et al. (3 issues, 2015–2016)
- Reich, by Elijah Brubaker, (12 issues, 2016–2017)
- Secret Voice, by Zack Soto (3 issues, 2015–2016)
- Slasher, by Charles Forsman (5 issues, 2017–2018)
- Sun Bakery, by Corey Lewis (4 issues, 2016–2017)
- Terra Flats, mostly by Jason Fischer (2 issues, 2016–2017)
- Titan, by François Vignéault (5 issues, 2016–2017)
- True Stories, by Derf Backderf (4 issues, 2014–2018)
- Vile, by Tyler Landry (2 issues, 2016–2017)
- The Willows, by Nathan Carson and Sam Ford (2 issues, 2017–2018)

== Graphic novels, trade paperbacks, and one-shots ==
- 9-11: Emergency Relief, by various writers and artists, January 2002, ISBN 1-891867-12-1.
- Aim to Dazzle, by Dean Haspiel, 2003
- The Cute Manifesto, by James Kochalka, 2005, ISBN 1-891867-73-3.
- Fancy Froglin's Sexy Forest, by James Kochalka, 2003, ISBN 1-891867-47-4.
- Fantastic Butterflies, by James Kochalka, 2002, ISBN 1-891867-18-0.
- Further Grickle, by Graham Annable, 2003, ISBN 1-891867-55-5.
- Grickle, by Graham Annable, 2001, ISBN 1-891867-01-6.
- Lou, by Melissa Mendes, 2016 ISBN 9781681485201
- Lunch Hour Comix by Rob Ullman, 2005
- Monica's Story, by "Anonymous," James Kochalka, and Tom Hart, 1999.
- The Mother's Mouth, by Dash Shaw, 2006, ISBN 1-891867-98-9.
- My Uncle Jeff, written by Damon Hurd & illustrated by Pedro Camello, 2003.
- Never Ending Summer, by Allison Cole, 2004, ISBN 1-891867-66-0.
- Opposable Thumbs, by Dean Haspiel, 2001
- Peanutbutter & Jeremy, by James Kochalka, 2004, ISBN 1-891867-46-6
- Pizzeria Kamikaze, written by Etgar Keret & illustrated by Asaf Hanuka, 2006, ISBN 1-891867-90-3.
- The Placebo Man, by Tomer Hanuka, 2006, ISBN 1-891867-91-1.
- Quit Your Job, by James Kochalka, 1998, ISBN 1-891867-00-8.
- RabbitHead, by Rebecca Dart, 2004, ISBN 1-891867-72-5.
- Red Eye, Black Eye, by K. Thor Jensen, 2007
- Salmon Doubts, by Adam Sacks, 2004, ISBN 1-891867-71-7.
- The Sequential Artists Workshop Guide to Creating Professional Comic Strips, by Tom Hart, 2016, ISBN 978-1934460894
- She's Not into Poetry: Mini-Comics 1991–1996, by Tom Hart, 2016, ISBN 978-1934460887
- Slowpoke: Café Pompous, by Jen Sorensen, 2001 ISBN 1-891867-02-4.
- Slowpoke: America Gone Bonkers, by Jen Sorensen, 2004 ISBN 1-891867-78-4.
- Stickleback, by Graham Annable, 2005, ISBN 1-891867-80-6.
- A Strange Day, written by Damon Hurd & illustrated by Tatiana Gill, 2005
- Strum and Drang: Great Moments in Rock 'n' Roll, by Joel Orff, 2003, ISBN 1-891867-27-X.
- Subway Series, by Leela Corman, 2002, ISBN 1-891867-14-8.
- Sweaterweather, by Sara Varon, 2003, ISBN 1-891867-49-0.
- Titans of Finance, by R. Walker & Josh Neufeld, 2001
- True Swamp: Underwoods and Overtime, by Jon Lewis, 2000
- True Swamp: Stoneground and Hillbound, by Jon Lewis, 2001
- Waterwise, by Joel Orff, 2004, ISBN 1-891867-82-2.
- When I'm Old, by Gabrielle Bell, 2003, ISBN 1-891867-43-1.
- The White Elephant, written by Damon Hurd & illustrated by Chris Steininger, 2005, ISBN 1-891867-64-4.
