= Tim Goodyear =

American comic artist (born 1977)

- Goodyear at the 2009 Stumptown Comics Festival.
- Born: Timothy Patrick Goodyear; 1977 (age 48–49) California, United States
- Areas: Cartoonist, Writer, Penciller, Inker
- Pseudonyms: Teenage Dinosaur; T. Taco Choadsmoker
- Notable works: Video Tonfa

Timothy "Tim" Patrick Goodyear (born August 1977) is an American minicomics publisher, distributor, and comics artist from San Jose, California. He has been a contributor to Tim Root's Crappy Comics, Sean Aaberg's PORK, and has compiled several collaborative zines.

== Teenage Dinosaur ==
Under the Teenage Dinosaur imprint, Goodyear publishes absurd and weird comic books.

- Dash Shaw Goddess Head 2005.
- Boy's Club 1 by Matt Furie (subsequent editions published by Buenaventura Press and now appearing monthly in The Believer magazine comics page).
- Negro Frankenstein by Al Frank
- Various, Bobby Madness
- Ariadne auf Naxos by Julia Gfrörer

== Teenage Dinosaur Comics Compilations ==
With Sparkplug Comic Books and Tugboat Press , Teenage Dinosaur has published three major minicomics compilations, which have been released every Free Comic Book Day since 2008.

- Nerd Burglar Nerd Burglar is a one-off comics anthology edited by Andrice Arp and Jeremy Tiedeman that was published jointly by Teenage Dinosaur, Sparkplug Comic Books, and Tugboat Press for Free Comic Book Day 2008.

Nerd Burglar was printed on vellum. It features short works by Bobby Madness, Elijah Brubaker, Chris Cilla, Sarah Oleksyk, Aron Nels Steinke, Jennifer Parks, Tim Root and Shawn Granton. The cover was drawn by Chris Cilla. Although free, due to the work by Bobby Madness and Chris Cilla the compilation now goes for $3–9 on eBay. With future editions, the publishers left a note in the indicia requesting that people charge "Free-99" for their joint Free Comic Book Day offerings.

- Bird Hurdler

Bird Hurdler features a preview of Ariadne auf Naxos volume 2 by Julia Gfrörer, a Pop Gun War universe tale by Farel Dalrymple, a Thanksgiving story by Lisa Eisenberg, a brief Theo Ellsworth jam, and very short semiautobiographical minicomic stories by Zack Soto, & a disturbing vignette by Andrice Arp. The front cover was drawn by Arp, with the back cover by Gfrörer.

- Dope Flounder
- Class of Skookum High (published jointly with Alarming Press)

Ryan Iverson, Jon Clark, Amanda Verwey, Karn, Beau von Tinklywinkle, Mark Thompson, Lily Gilbert, Seth Weber, Birch Cooper, Max Clotfelter, Sean Christensen (Awesome But True), Michael Aushenker, Moises Domingo Rios

- Blowjizzy Nizzy (published by pre-teen dinosaur) Art by goodyear. This is considered by many to be the first underground comic book, published in 1963.

== Works ==
Video Tonfa

- The Punisher Series
- Child's Play
- Rockn'Roll 420 Killaz
- Knowledge
- For sheezle my neezle, this is my steez.
- Video Tonfa / Feedback split (with John Isaacson)

== In popular culture ==
Goodyear appears as himself in Jesse Reklaw's book tour diary and self-help book Ten Thousand Things to Do. Goodyear has appeared outside doing things sometimes but enjoys the indoor gentleman lifestyle. He frequently sports a so-called Canadian Tuxedo, as seen in the compilation Dope Flounder.
