= Jack's Luck Runs Out =

Comic book by Jason Little

- Cover art for Jack's Luck Runs Out

Publication information
- Publisher: Top Shelf Productions
- Format: One-shot
- Publication date: 1998
- No. of issues: 1

Creative team
- Created by: Jason Little

Jack's Luck Runs Out is a full-color one-shot comic book created by Jason Little. The book features playing cards as characters, where the title character is a jack. In March 1998, Little received a grant to help publish the book from the Xeric Foundation. The book was published by Top Shelf Productions.

== Development ==
Little considered Jack's Luck Runs Out originally to be an exercise in drawing, but it eventually developed into a full-fledged comic book. The entire book was drawn and inked before the faces were added, which were taken from playing cards. When adding the faces, Little spent nine hours cutting and photocopying the faces of playing cards. The majority of the computer work was done on a PC 486. Towards the end of development, Little was working at MTV, and was able to use their computers to complete it. The final thirty-six hours of work was done in a single session. Little was inspired to create Jack's Luck Runs Out by the comics of Evan Dorkin.

== Style ==
The three main characters are based on the three face cards in a deck of playing cards (Jack, Queen, and King). To emulate the style of playing cards, Little used primary colors and the decorative qualities found in the design of many playing cards. Since playing cards originate from medieval times, they have a distinct two-dimensional quality to them. Because of this, Little chose to use flat perspective for the comic book.

== Awards ==
In 1999, Little was nominated for a Harvey Award for "Best New Talent" as well as an Ignatz Award for "Promising New Talent" for his work on Jack's Luck Runs Out.

== See also ==
- List of Xeric grant winners
