= Sparkplug Comics =

American alternative comics company

Sparkplug Comic Books
- Founded: 2002
- Founder: Dylan Williams
- Defunct: 2016
- Country of origin: U.S.A.
- Headquarters location: Portland, Oregon
- Key people: Virginia Paine, Tom Neely
- Publication types: Comic books, graphic novels
- Fiction genres: Alternative

Sparkplug Comic Books was a publisher and distributor of alternative comics founded by cartoonist Dylan Williams. Based in Portland, Oregon, the company operated from 2002 to 2016. The publisher's backlist was later handled by Alternative Comics.

Cartoonists published by Sparkplug included Austin English, Jason Shiga, Renée French, Julia Gfrörer, Katie Skelly, Juliacks, Yumi Sakugawa, Whit Taylor, Elijah Brubaker, and Jeff LeVine.

Sparkplug eschewed traditional distributors and comic book retailers; instead focusing on festivals, conventions, and direct sales through the company website.

== History ==
One of Sparkplug's first projects, Jason Shiga's Fleep, was the 2003 Eisner Award winner for Talent Deserving of Wider Recognition. (Shiga's Bookhunter, published in 2007, was also nominated for a couple of industry awards.)

From 2008 to 2015 Sparkplug co-published annual mini-comic anthologies in commemoration of Free Comic Book Day; they were always produced in partnership with Tim Goodyear's company Teenage Dinosaur as well as other Portland-area small-press publishers.

Sparkplug founder Dylan Williams died of leukemia in September 2011; three projects were published posthumously via the crowdfunding site IndieGoGo.

After Williams' death, the company was run as a trio by Virginia Paine, Tom Neely, and Williams' widow Emily Nillson. Paine took over as sole publisher of Sparkplug in 2013.

Sparkplug shut down in June 2016, with the company's backlist moving to Alternative Comics.

== Publications ==
=== Ongoing titles ===
- Eschew (2 issues, 2010) – Robert Sergel
- Jin & Jam (1 issue, 2009) – Hellen Jo
- Papercutter (16 issues, 2006–2016) – (co-published with Teenage Dinosaur and Tugboat Press)
- Reich (12 issues, 2007–2014) – Elijah Brubaker
- Sparkplug Minis:
1. Hungry Summer (2014) – Asher Craw
2. The Anthropologists (2014) – Whit Taylor
3. Bird Girl and Fox Girl (2014) – Yumi Sakugawa
4. Ce/Za – Suzette Smith (2015)
5. A Wretch Like Me (Oct. 2015) – Ebin Lee
- Tales to Demolish (3 issues, 2003–2006) – Eric Haven
- Watching Days Become Years (4 issues, July 2003–2007) – Jeff LeVine
- Windy Corner Magazine (3 issues, 2007–2009) – Austin English

=== Graphic novels, anthologies, collections, and one-shots ===
- Asiaddict (2006) – Mats!
- Asthma (2006) – John Hankiewicz
- Bookhunter (2007) – Jason Shiga
- Christina and Charles (2006) – Austin English
- Danny Dutch (2009) – David King
- Department of Art (2009) – Dunja Jankovic
- The Disgusting Room (2011) – Austin English
- Edison Steelhead's Lost Portfolio: Exploratory Studies of Girls and Rabbits (June 2007) ISBN 978-0974271576 – Renée French
- Fleep (2002) – Jason Shiga
- Flesh and Bone (2010) – Julia Gfrörer
- Gay Genius (2011) – edited by Annie Murphy
- The Golem of Gabirol (2012) – Olga Volozova
- The Heavy Hand (2011) – Chris Cilla
- The Hot Breath of War (2008) – Trevor Alixopulos
- Inkweed (2007) – Chris Wright
- It Lives (2003) – Ted May
- Lemon Styles (2010) – David King
- Nurse Nurse (2012) – Katie Skelly
- Orchid (2002) – anthology of Victorian horror stories adapted into comics form, edited by Dylan Williams and Ben Catmull
- Passage (2012) – Tessa Brunton
- Reporter: Little Black (2002) – Dylan Williams
- Rock That Never Sleeps (2009) – Olga Volazova and Juliacks
- Whirlwind Wonderland (2010) – Rina Ayuyang (co-published with Tugboat Press)

=== Free Comic Book Day mini-comic anthologies ===
- 2008 Nerd Burglar– edited by Andrice Arp and Jeremy Tiedeman; co-published with Teenage Dinosaur and Tugboat Press
- 2009 Bird Hurdler – co-published with Teenage Dinosaur and Tugboat Press
- 2010 Dope Flounder – co-published with Teenage Dinosaur and Tugboat Press
- 2011 Dan Quayl – co-published with Teenage Dinosaur, Revival House Press, and Gazeta Comics
- 2012 Brad Trip – co-published with Teenage Dinosaur, Revival House, and Floating World Comics
- 2013 Master P's Theater – co-published with Floating World Comics, Snakebomb Comix, and Teenage Dinosaur
- 2014 Barrio Mothers – co-published with Floating World Comics, Snakebomb Comix, and Teenage Dinosaur
- 2015 Free Stooges – co-published with Floating World Comics, Snakebomb Comix, and Teenage Dinosaur
