= Whit Taylor =

Whit Taylor may refer to:

- Whit Taylor (American football)
- Whit Taylor (cartoonist)
