= Dark Mind =

Dark Mind may refer to:

- Dark Mind, a character in the video game Kirby & the Amazing Mirror
- Dark Mind, a character in the Japanese tokusatsu drama Kamen Rider Ghost
- Dark Minds, a television series by M. William Phelps that aired on the Investigation Discovery channel
- Darkmind, an album by Beto Vázquez Infinity, 2008
- Darkminds, a comic book series by Pat Lee, under the Image Comics imprint
- Darkmind, a character from the Johnny Raygun comic book series

== See also ==
- The Darkest Minds (book series), by Alexandra Bracken
  - The Darkest Minds film based on the book series, 2011
- Dark Mind, Dark Heart, anthology series by August Derleth
