= Jonathon Dalton =

Canadian cartoonist (born 1977)

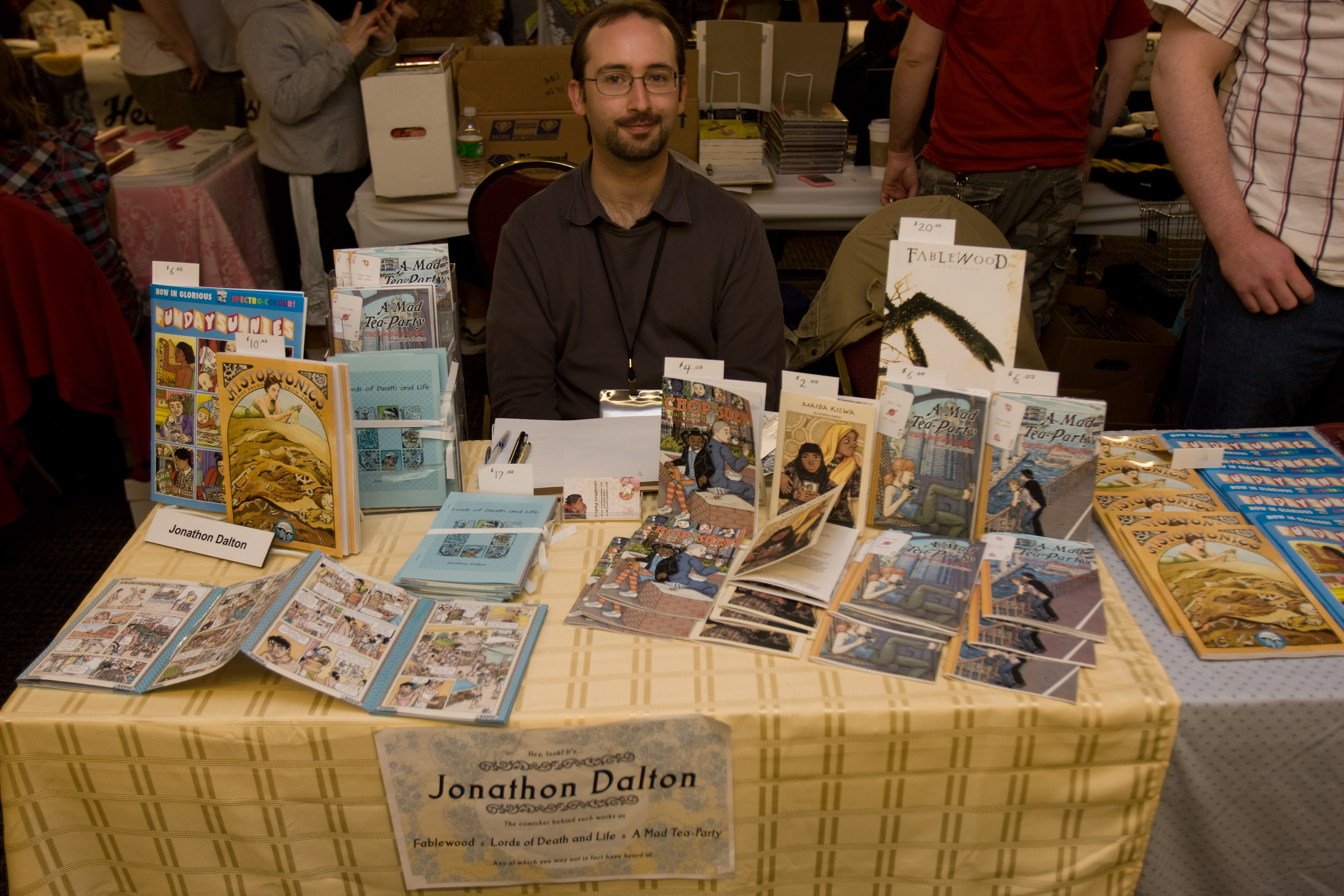
- Dalton at Stumptown Comics Fest, 2009
- Born: September 16, 1977 (age 48); Canada
- Occupations: Comic writer, Illustrator, elementary teacher
- Writing career
- Period: 1997–present
- Genres: Science fiction, fantasy, speculative fiction
- Notable works: A Mad Tea Party, Lords of Death and Life
- Notable awards: 2010 Xeric Award
- Website: jonathondalton.com

Jonathon Dalton (born September 16, 1977) is a Canadian artist specializing in comics and webcomics. Dalton created the webcomics A Mad Tea-Party and Lords of Death and Life, and co-founded the Vancouver-based comics society Cloudscape Comics.

== Beginnings ==
Dalton was inspired to create comics at an early age. He earned a Bachelor of Fine Arts from the University of Victoria.

Almost as soon as I started reading comic books I decided that making them was what I wanted to do for a living. The trouble was, I was determined to draw my own strange stories in my own style rather than learn the style preferred by the Big Two. Periodic rejection letters over the years failed to convince me to change my ways. When web comics started to multiply on the internet I threw myself wholeheartedly into that world.

In 2003 Dalton began writing his weekly science fiction webcomic A Mad Tea-Party. He teaches elementary school in the town of Mission on the outskirts of Vancouver, British Columbia. He is the director of communications and co-founder of the Vancouver-based comics society entitled Cloudscape Comics.

== Achievements ==
In 2010 Dalton won the Xeric Grant for his book Lords of Death and Life. Lords of Death and Life was also nominated for Outstanding Environment Design in the 2007 Web Cartoonists' Choice Awards. The following year, in 2008, he was presented with the award for Outstanding Long Form Comic. Dalton's work has been published in Cloudscape anthologies and the 2008 Fablewood anthology from Ape Entertainment. His 2009 short story "Lil' Ulysses in Chicago" was listed as a Notable Comic in the 2010 edition of Best American Comics.

In 2010, he was described by interviewees in the National Post as one of Canada's "most under-appreciated comic artists working today".
