= The Rumpus =

American literary magazine

- Website type: Literature, culture
- Owners: Roxane Gay and Debbie Millman
- Editor: Laura June Topolsky (managing editor)
- Website: therumpus.net
- Launched: 2009; 17 years ago

The Rumpus is an online literary magazine founded by Stephen Elliott, and launched on January 20, 2009. The site features interviews, book reviews, essays, comics, and critiques of creative culture as well as original fiction and poetry. The site runs two subscription-based book clubs and two subscription-based letters programs, Letters in the Mail and Letters for Kids.

The Rumpus has fostered writers, artists, and editors like Roxane Gay who served as Essays Editor and who credits the site for developing her audience, Isaac Fitzgerald who served as managing editor before moving to BuzzFeed to help create BuzzFeed Books, Rick Moody, Wendy MacNaughton, Paul Madonna, Peter Orner, Yumi Sakugawa, Steve Almond, and Cheryl Strayed, who began her "Dear Sugar" advice column on the site.

In July 2016, the site launched the Rumpus Lo-Fi Film Festival in Los Angeles as response to the high cost of other festivals.

In January 2017, The Rumpus was purchased by Marisa Siegel, previously the site's managing editor. Siegel was editor-in-chief and owner of The Rumpus for five years, before selling the magazine to Alyson Sinclair in January 2022. Sinclair appointed Alysia Li Ying Sawchyn editor-in-chief. In September 2023, Sawchyn was succeeded as editor-in-chief by Aram Mrjoian, who left some time prior to July 2025.

In May 2025, Roxane Gay and Debbie Millman acquired the magazine from Sinclair. As of December 2025, Stephanie Trott was no longer listed as managing editor, and the masthead featured Laura June Topolsky in that position instead.
