= Fleep =

Graphic novel by Jason Shiga

Fleep is a graphic novel by Jason Shiga. It was originally published in comic strip format in AsianWeek in 2002. It was later collected and published by Sparkplug Comic Books.

== Synopsis ==
A young man, Jimmy Yee, enters a telephone booth to make a call to his wife Jenny, saying he was running late. After he closes the door and the light in the booth turns on, he then wakes up in darkness. He tries to open the door, but it is stuck. When he closes it and turns on the light, he finds the booth encased in concrete. He tries to call 911, but receives no response.

Jimmy calls the operator, but hears only gibberish. Examining the telephone directory, he finds it written in a similarly incomprehensible language. He calls out for help, then contacts the operator again, asking if she speaks English, to no avail. After calculating his survival time, including constructing an origami balloon, he estimates that he has 56 hours of air, and 48 hours before dying from dehydration unless he can recycle his fluids.

Examining his coat and pants, Jimmy finds two pens he can use for writing and as a straw, dental floss to clean his teeth, a digital wristwatch, a paperback with Russian text which he determines to be a dictionary to translate into a foreign language, three coins of an unknown currency with writing in the same language, and a handwritten note in Russian with the name of his wife Jenny Chu in Latin script on the front and two 6-digit numbers in the back. He dismantles the bowl of the overhead light with the coin and fills it with urine, which he immediately drinks.

Seeing the number listed on the payphone has six digits, Jimmy determines that the numbers in the note are phone numbers. He calls the first number, but it is dead; calling the second number rings, but it falls dead before the phone booth rumbles, which he presumes is an earthquake's aftershock. However, it doesn't explain how the booth became encased in concrete despite being outside. He is about to fall asleep when he finds his watch reads 1:00 PM. He constructs a Foucault pendulum with the bowl and the floss and determines he is between the 37th and 49th parallel north and estimates his longitude to be between the 129th and 147th meridian east, creating a rectangle that encompasses only two countries: Russia and Simbia, a former Soviet republic on an island in the Sea of Japan.

Determining that he was visiting Jenny's family in Simbia, Jimmy presumes that he had entered the booth to take shelter when the ceiling of the building collapsed, causing him to hit his head against the booth's bookstand, resulting in amnesia. He attempts to call the American embassy, but receives no response. Unable to find a listing for an English embassy in the directory, he initially attempts to chisel his way out, but determines he cannot open a hole in time, and is forced to use the phone to call for help. He derives 29 possible emergency phone numbers, but realizes he cannot understand or speak either Russian or the local language: the only word he could understand is fleep, the Simbanese word for "phone" written on the booth's exterior.

After briefly examining the dictionary, Jimmy contacts the operator and says the payphone's number; she responds, Fleep telading 10 gilba. Understanding it to mean he has to put in a 10-gilba coin to call, he begins calling the possible numbers, saying Fleep telading Jimmy! to each one, but receives no response. Examining the directory listing under Fleep, he realizes the possibility that he is in a bank of telephone booths. He calls two consecutive numbers and hears the ringing of a second payphone. He presumes that an empty booth filled with air is separated by three to four inches of concrete. He begins chiseling again, but expresses doubts about reaching it without wasting oxygen.

Jimmy then remembers that he could call the other phones in the bank, so he calls one and hears it ringing in the distance. He hears it stop and a woman's voice calls out over the line, saying a single Russian phrase repeatedly. (Note: The comic writes her line as Меня на перевôдбı; перевôдбı is likely a misspelling of Russian: переводы, perevody (lit. translation), suggesting the broken Russian phrase Меня на переводы ("Me on translation"), implying she is a Simbanese interpreter with limited knowledge of Russian.) He guesses that she wishes to contact the Russian embassy, so he hangs up and finds the number for it in the directory and calls it, only to find the line dead. He tries calling both consecutive numbers as well as alternative numbers for the embassy, to no avail.

Jimmy notices the prefix for the embassy numbers is the same as the number on the payphone and realizes he is inside the embassy. Remembering that Simbia is not on any fault line, he deduces that the building was actually brought down by a bomb, possibly as part of a terrorist attack. He contemplates how a bomber could have activated it and guesses it was triggered by telephone lines; he is unnerved about this knowledge. He also determines that the aftershock was actually a second bombing that he guesses was five to six blocks away—where the American embassy is located. He recognizes the prefix for that embassy's phone number in the note and realizes that he was the perpetrator of the attacks.

Returning to the note, Jimmy recognizes it to be in his own handwriting and determines that it is likely a manifesto intended to be communicated to the Russian government. He creates a rough translation of the manifesto in Simbanese, and calls the local authorities to read it and call for an English-speaking negotiator. The negotiator answers and addresses him as "head of the Simbanese Liberation Front". Jimmy asks to contact Jenny, but the negotiator reveals that he said in the manifesto that she had died two years prior, having been killed as a civilian casualty in joint US-Russian air raids against the country. As he realizes what he has done, he hangs up and breaks through to the neighboring telephone booth before the phone rings again.

On the phone is a man named Alan, a fellow member of the SLF, who has communicated with search and rescue personnel; it would take two more days to reach Jimmy's floor. Feeling guilty, he tells Alan to call the trapped woman two booths away and tell her to begin chiseling to the empty booth to save her life instead. After hanging up, he covers up the hole and resigns himself to his fate as he hopes to be reunited with his wife in death. He estimates that he has one hour and 23 minutes before he begins hallucinating, but questions if even his entire ordeal was a hallucination as he begins to hear Jenny's voice.

== Reception ==
The collected Fleep won the 2003 Ignatz Award for Outstanding Story.

Time described Fleep as "ingenious", "far from predictable", and "worthy of Arthur Conan Doyle". The Comics Journal considered its ending to be "quite shocking", and an example of the "strain of nihilism" in Shiga's work.

== Publication history ==
Shaenon K. Garrity has noted that the publishers of AsianWeek had wanted "a comic about the 'Asian-American experience'", and were consequently "a little baffled" by Fleep, which fits that description only in that the protagonist is Asian-American. AsianWeek cancelled Fleep mid-story, and Shiga then took it to the Modern Tales webcomics collective.
