= Andrice Arp =

American artist

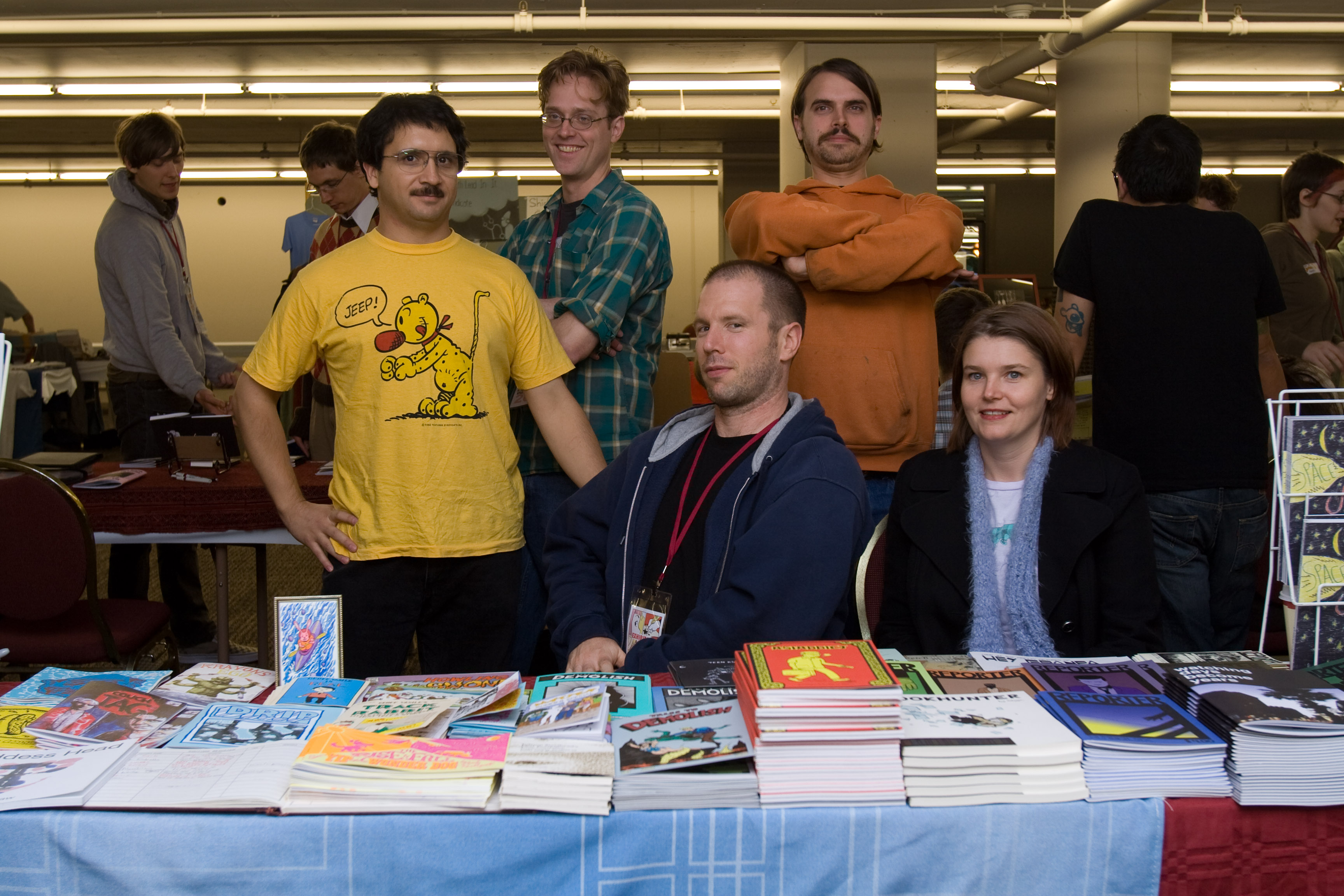
- Andrice Arp (right) with Chris Cilla, Jesse Reklaw, Dylan Willians, and Tim Goodyear at the Stumptown Comics Festival in 2007.
- Born: 1969 (age 56–57)
- Areas: Writer, Artist, Editor

Andrice Arp (born 1969 in Los Angeles) is a U.S. comics artist and illustrator. She is the daughter of astronomer Halton Arp.

Arp was a contributor and co-editor (along with Bishakh Som, Howard John Arey, and Joan Reilly) of Hi-Horse Omnibus comics anthology, published by Alternative Comics in 2004. (Another of the book's contributors, Martin Cendreda, was nominated for a 2004 Ignatz Award for Promising New Talent.) Arp also contributed to the comics anthology Mome.

In September 2006, Arp's work was featured in an exhibit at the Cartoon Art Museum in San Francisco, as well as a museum in New York.

Her illustrations have appeared in Shout magazine, Kitchen Sink magazine, and The New York Times. Arp has illustrated three covers of Scram, a Journal of Unpopular Culture (issues #1, #10 and #20). She also works as an illustrator for the book-swapping web site BookMooch, restaurant-music provider MoodMixes, and audio engineering company ToneGnome.
