= Jon Lewis (cartoonist) =

American cartoonist (b. 1971)

- Born: July 25, 1971 (age 55) Saint Paul, Minnesota, U.S.
- Areas: Cartoonist, Writer
- Notable works: True Swamp; Robin
- Awards: Xeric Foundation grant (1993)

Jon Lewis (b. July 25, 1971) is an American alternative cartoonist best known for his series True Swamp.

Lewis favors ensemble casts over single protagonists and often builds immersive worlds without strict geographic or scientific mapping, allowing for a dreamlike narrative logic. His stories explore friendship, sexuality, knowledge, religion, and mortality, frequently using animal characters to reflect human concerns.

== Early life ==
Lewis, of half-Norwegian heritage, grew up in Minnesota. A serious intestinal illness in his late teens forced him to leave high school, during which time he immersed himself in books, music, and comics. Early influences included British animal stories such as Kenneth Grahame's The Wind in the Willows, Beatrix Potter, and A. A. Milne's Winnie-the-Pooh, along with American underground comix and "new wave" comics encountered through publications like Weirdo. In the late 1980s, he began producing and trading photocopied minicomics, taking advantage of the expanding U.S. small-press network.

== Career ==
Lewis moved to Seattle in 1990, at the time a hotbed of alternative comics. He quickly found a circle of young comic book artists — including Megan Kelso, Tom Hart, Ed Brubaker, David Lasky, and Jason Lutes — drawing and publishing their own work. With them, Lewis aspired to take clichéd or neglected genres of comics and revitalize them with the lessons learned from the first wave of alternative comics.

=== True Swamp ===
Lewis' True Swamp is a surreal, philosophical series about the lives of intelligent swamp creatures, and has been described as similar to Walt Kelly's Pogo. Lenny the Frog and the other swamp denizens balance feelings of love, jealousy, and spiritual angst with their animal instincts for food, sex, and survival. True Swamp blends earthy humor, dream logic, and existential reflection in a vividly strange natural world; The swamp is dangerous and death-haunted but also full of small joys.

The series first appeared in self-published form in 1992. Lewis was awarded a Xeric Foundation grant — "established by Teenage Mutant Ninja Turtles cocreator Peter Laird to help young cartoonists print and distribute independent work" — in the fall of 1993 to self-publish True Swamp; he published three issues in 1994 under his imprint Peristaltic Press. (Peristalsis, the biological term for the wave-like muscle contractions that move food through the digestive tract — and fluids through other tubular systems in the body — was Lewis playing with the idea of irregular but steady movement forward — a quirky, organic metaphor for how his comics made their way into the world.)

Despite Lewis winning the Xeric Foundation grant, in 1994, Diamond Comic Distributors refused to distribute True Swamp. This decision was part of a broader pattern where Diamond, at the time the dominant U.S. comic book distributor, declined to carry certain independent comics, citing concerns over content and marketability. Despite this initial setback, Lewis continued to publish True Swamp through other avenues for the next 15+ years, with stories appearing in True Swamp vol. 2, #4–5 (Slave Labor Graphics, 1994–1995), Dark Horse Presents #100-101 (Dark Horse Comics, 1995), Ghost Ship #1 (Slave Labor, 1996), True Swamp: Underwoods and Overtime (Alternative Comics, 2000), and True Swamp: Stoneground and Hillbound (Alternative Comics, 2001). Time magazine named True Swamp: Underwoods and Overtime one of 2000's best comic books. In 2011–2012, Uncivilized Books published two issues of a True Swamp series that collected material originally published online from spring 2010.

Uncivilized Books has published two collections of Lewis' True Swamp work — True Swamp: Choose Your Poison (2012) and True Swamp: Anywhere But In... (2017).

=== Other work ===
Other series produced by Lewis include Ghost Ship (Slave Labor, 3 issues, 1996) and Spectacles (Alternative Comics, 4 issues, 1997–1998). Ghost Ship, known for its surreal storytelling and dark humor, incorporated characters from True Swamp. Spectacles marked a departure from Lewis' earlier work by focusing on more grounded, human-centric narratives. Delving into themes of identity, culture, and transformation, Spectacles employs a conversational tone and introspective narratives, reflecting Lewis's interest in folklore and his ability to weave mythological elements into contemporary settings.

In 2006, Alternative Comics published Lewis' The Power of 6, a dialogue-driven superhero team book. Subtitled The Twisted Apples, it was conceived as the first installment of a planned multi-part series, but only the debut issue was released.

=== Robin and mainstream comics writing ===
In 2002–2003, Lewis was hired by DC Comics, taking over (from Chuck Dixon) as writer of Robin, the Tim Drake title. Lewis' run on Robin included storylines like “Broken Home” and “Unmasked,” which explored Tim Drake’s dual life and personal challenges. Lewis' mainstream work was known for strong character voices and psychological angles; some critics at the time found his writing more experimental than typical DC fare, which both intrigued and divided readers. Lewis's run as Robin writer concluded with issue #120 (late 2003).

In 2005, Lewis wrote "Exit Menu", a story for Detective Comics #805 — illustrated by Jeff Parker — which was pulled from the issue before release.

== Awards ==
- 1993 Xeric Award (for True Swamp)
- 2002 (nomination) Ignatz Award for Outstanding Comic (for True Swamp: Stoneground and Hillbound)

== Comicography ==
=== As writer/artist ===
==== True Swamp ====
- True Swamp vol. 1, #1 (self-published, Sept. 1992)
- True Swamp vol. 2, #1–3 (Peristaltic Press, Feb.–July 1994)
- True Swamp vol. 2, #4–5 (Slave Labor Graphics, Oct. 1994–Feb. 1995)
- True Swamp: Underwoods and Overtime (Alternative Comics, 2000)
- True Swamp: Stoneground and Hillbound (Alternative Comics, 2001)
- True Swamp (2 issues, Uncivilized Books, 2011–c. 2012)
- True Swamp: Choose Your Poison (Uncivilized Books, November 2012)
- True Swamp: Anywhere But In... (Uncivilized Books, July 2017)

==== Other work ====
- "Aboard the Drinking Leviathan," Dark Horse Presents #100-1 (Dark Horse, Aug. 1995)
- Ghost Ship #1–3 (Slave Labor Graphics, Mar. 1996–Oct. 1996)
- "Outside, Inside: A Constructive Tragedy," Dark Horse Presents #124 (Dark Horse, Aug. 1997)
- "Californiament," SPX '97 Comic #1 (SPX, Sept. 1997)
- Spectacles #1–4 (Alternative Comics, 1997–1998)
- (with Tom Hart) "Satchel of Weltschmerz - The Body of Social - Part 1," Oni Double Feature #8 (Oni Press, Aug. 1998)
- (with Tom Hart) "Satchel of Weltschmerz - The Body of Social - Part 2," Oni Double Feature #9 (Oni Press, Oct. 1998)
- "Virtue and Virtuosity," Expo 2001 (The EXPO, 2001)
- The Power of 6 (Alternative Comics, 2006)
- Local Stations (self-published, c. 2011) — collects "micro-stories"
- Klagen: A Horror (Uncivilized Books, 2011)
- ["story about a boy's kindness gaining him a special reward"], Cartozia Tales #1 (Cartozia Press, 2013)
- "Two Ways to Nadir" ("Brother"), in Flashed: Sudden Stories in Comics and Prose (Pressgang, 2016)

=== As writer ===
- "The Homo Test" (co-written with Ed Brubaker), art by Sam Henderson, in Oh That Monroe one-shot (Wow Cool, 1995)
- "The Mini-Horse!" (a Pitch Unger story), art by Tom Hart, Expo 2000 (SPX, [July] 2000)
- "Look Away," art by Michael Zulli, Vertigo Secret Files & Origins: Swamp Thing #1 (DC Comics, Nov. 2000)
- Robin issues #100–120, art usually by Pete Woods (DC Comics, Mar. 2002–Nov. 2003)
- "Gottismburgh", art by Stefano Gaudiano, Detective Comics #781 (DC Comics, June 2003)
- "French Fried," art by Phil Moy, The Powerpuff Girls #57 (DC Comics, Feb. 2005)
- "Rain Rain Go Away," art by Christopher Cook and Mike DeCarlo, The Powerpuff Girls #66 (DC Comics, Nov. 2005)
- "Pulling for the Bad Guys" (a Courage the Cowardly Dog story), art by Scott Neely, Cartoon Network Block Party #19 (DC Comics, May 2006)

== External ==
- Official website

Preceded by Chuck Dixon	Robin writer 2002–2003	Succeeded by Bill Willingham
