= Phillip Bourassa =

American art director

- Born: September 1, 1977 (age 49); Los Angeles, California, USA

Phillip Bourassa (born September 1, 1977) is an American art director and cartoonist.

In September 2011, Philip Bourassa won a Primetime Emmy award for Individual Achievement in Animation for his character design work in the Young Justice episode, Independence Day. In March, 2001, he won a Xeric grant for First World.
