= Yumi Sakugawa =

Comic artist

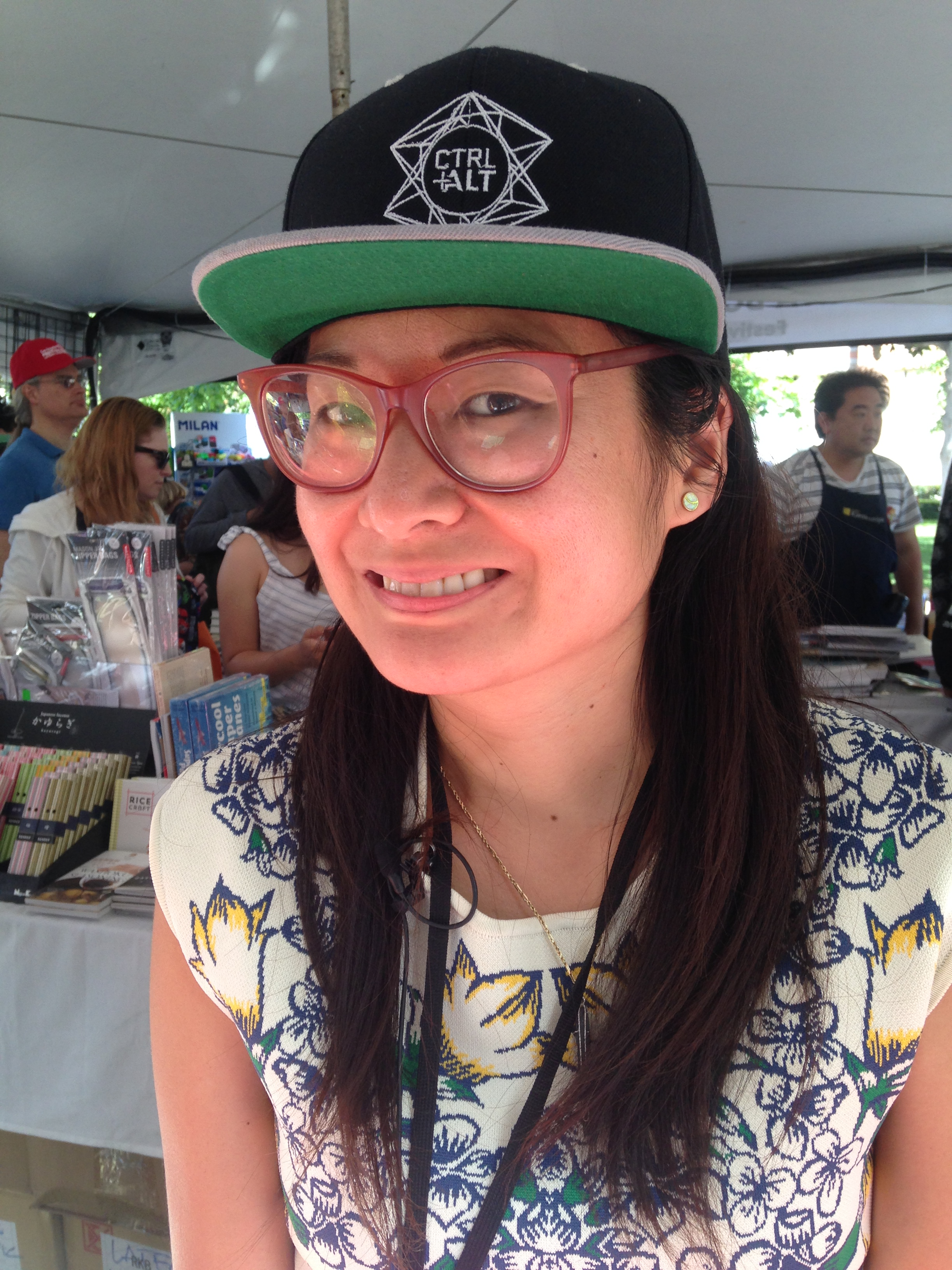
- Yumi Sakugawa at the Los Angeles Times Festival of Books, April 2017
- Born: Orange County, California
- Education: University of California, Los Angeles
- Writing career
- Genre: Comics

Yumi Sakugawa is a comic artist based in California. Her work has been published online, in feminist magazines and in book form. Sakugawa also edits a blog about wellness. She was nominated for an Ignatz Award in 2014 for her mini comic, Never Forgets.

== Biography ==
Sakugawa was born in Orange, growing up in Anaheim Hills. Sakugawa had always loved drawing and writing, but she wasn't sure how to use both until in college, she started creating comics. She attended the University of California, Los Angeles (UCLA), where she was a part of the largest & longest running Asian-American Theatre Company in the United States; LCC Theatre Company. She graduated in 2007.

Sakugawa has stated that she prefers to write her ideas first, illustrating them after she has a clear sense of the narrative. Her influences include Haruki Murakami, Aimee Bender, Hellen Jo, and Adrian Tomine, among others. She is a self-professed Sailor Moon fan and has cited Noriko's Dinner Table as one of her favorite films.

Her short comic “Mundane Fortunes for the Next Ten Billion Years” was selected as a Notable Comic of 2012 by the Best American Comics series editors.

Reviews of her 2014 book, I Think I Am In Friend Love With You, have been favorable and her art and writing has been called "eerie and wondrous" by Juxtapoz.

Her book, Your Illustrated Guide to Becoming One With the Universe, explores the ideas of mindfulness and meditation, making the abstract into the concrete and also with drawings that are "curious, mischievous, ready to engage." She created the book in order to develop a kind of self-help book she had been unable to find on her own: one which wasn't simply written out or full of lists. She decided to use her "love for creating visual stories" in order to make a new kind of self-help guide. Your Illustrated Guide was selected by NPR's Book Concierge as one of "2014's Great Reads".

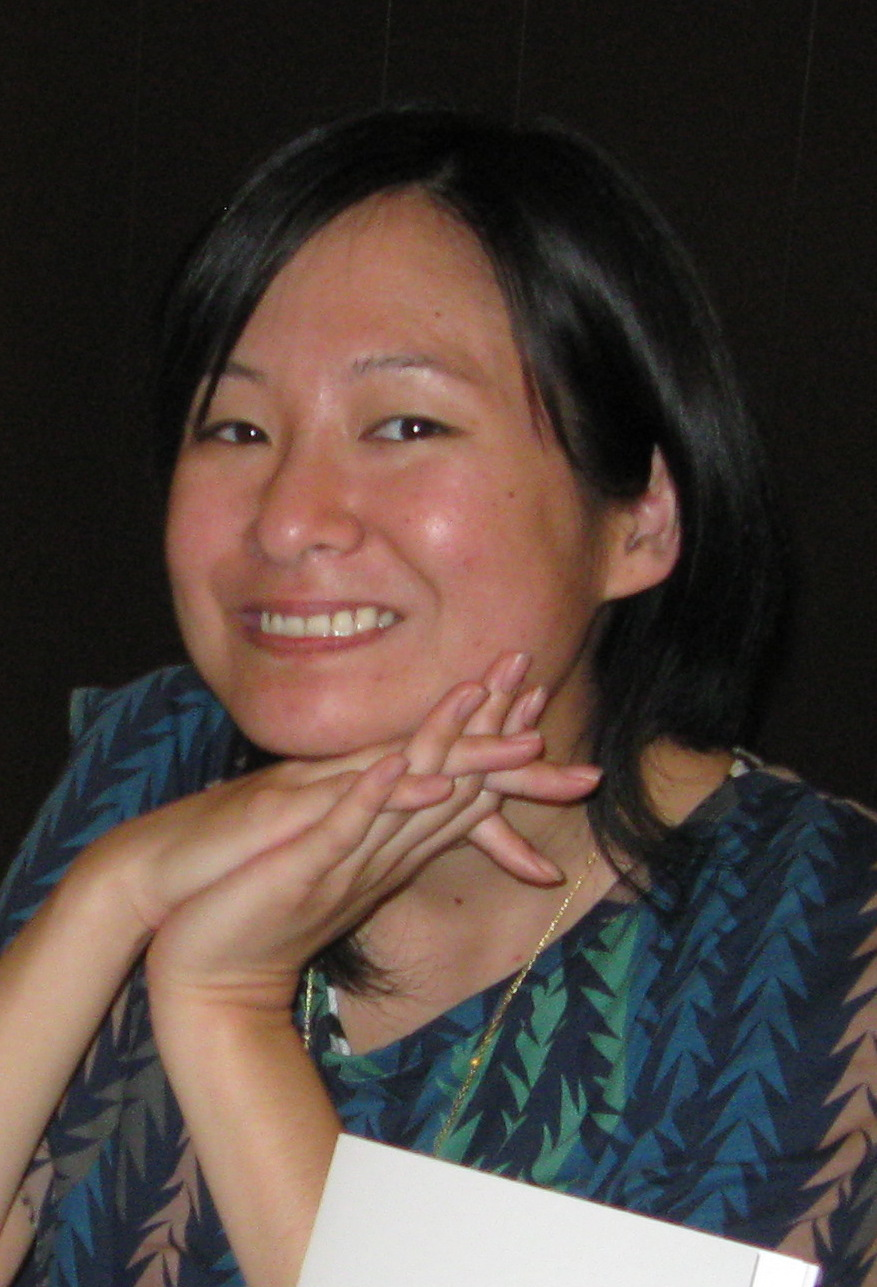
Yumi Sakugawa, photographed at the LA Zine Fest, 2013

She was a regular comic contributor to the website, WonderHowTo.

She was one of the participating artists in the Giant Robot Biennale 4 which will be featured at the Japanese American National Museum between October 2015 and January 2016.

== Bibliography ==
=== Books ===
- I Think I am in Friend-Love With You. Avon, Massachusetts: Adams Media. 2014. ISBN 9781440573026.
- Your Illustrated Guide to Becoming One With the Universe. Avon, Massachusetts: Adams Media. 2014. ISBN 9781440582639.
- There Is No Right Way to Meditate: And Other Lessons. Avon, Massachusetts: Adams Media. 2015. ISBN 9781440592522.
- The Little Book of Life Hacks: How to Make Your Life Happier, Healthier, and More Beautiful. St. Martin's Press. 2017.

=== Selected short stories and minicomics ===
- A Special Message For You Hand-Delivered To You From The Universe. 2012. (Self-published; compilation of comics between 2010 and 2012)
- Intergalactic Telepathic Pen Pal and Other Super-Short Stories. 2012. (Self-published; compilation of comics between 2011 and 2012)
- Claudia Kishi: My Asian-American Female Role Model of the 90's. 2012. (Self-published; originally posted online on Sadie Magazine)
- Moon Between the Mountains. 2013. (Self-published; originally posted online on The Rumpus)
- Never Forgets. 2014. (Self-published)
- Bird Girl and Fox Girl. Sparkplug Books. 2014.
- Transcendent Exercises for the Uninspired Artist. 2014. (Self-published)
- Ikebana. Retrofit Comics. 2015.
- Fashion Forecasts. 2016. (Self-published; a limited run for Crosslines, a SmithsonianAPA event in Washington, D.C.)
