= Demon (comics) =

Comic by Jason Shiga

- Cover art of Demon issue 1
- Author: Jason Shiga
- Website: Demon on Shigabooks
- Current status/schedule: Completed
- Launch date: January 2014
- End date: May 2016
- Publishers: Shigabooks (mini & webcomic); First Second (graphic novel)
- Genre: Supernatural action

Demon is an American supernatural action comic by Jason Shiga. The comic, which follows a man who apparently cannot die, was self-published from 2014 to 2016 as a mini-comic and webcomic, then released as a four-volume, 720-page graphic novel by First Second Books in 2016 and 2017. It was unusually well-organized for a webcomic, having been entirely written and laid out before its release, with a well-founded story, consistent art, and daily updates.

The comic was received favourably by critics, who praised the clever story; its puzzles and plot twists; the artwork, which balanced the often grim subject matter; and the surprising humor. The comic won an Eisner Award and an Ignatz Award.

== Plot ==
At a motel, Jimmy Yee repeatedly kills himself and reawakens. The police misidentify him and suspect him of murdering motel guests. Jimmy concludes that he is a "demon", and that each time he dies, his mind possesses the closest person.

Agent Hunter of the OSS (Note: It is never specified what the OSS is, but in the story, it was formed in the 1940s for secret state intervention. It may be an allusion to the US Office of Strategic Services.) takes custody of Jimmy. Jimmy attempts to provoke a suicide by cop, attacking Hunter, but is overpowered. Hunter locks the fatally injured Jimmy in a supermax prison death row cell so that Jimmy will possess the neighbouring inmate. Jimmy improvises a weapon and suicides through dozens of condemned prisoners until he possesses a guard and escapes.

Jimmy plans to kill an imprisoned drunk driver to avenge his family. The OSS set a trap, but both parties are surprised to find that Jimmy's 10-year-old daughter, Sweet Pea, is a demon possessing the brain-damaged drunk driver. Jimmy kills his way through the agents and escapes. He threatens to destroy the OSS if Sweet Pea is not brought to him. Hunter attempts another trap, but Jimmy kills the entire group and reunites with Sweet Pea. Hunter tricks Jimmy into making a disadvantageous possession and captures him.

It is explained that the OSS had planned to make demons to replace hostile dictators with US puppets. However, project leader Dr. Gellman used the demonizer on himself and then killed his coworkers. Jimmy is offered a pardon to kill Gellman, who they say plans to attack the US. Jimmy agrees, but goes rogue and provokes a military response to destroy the OSS base. Everyone inside is killed, with Sweet Pea possessing her way out. Jimmy decides that he and Sweet Pea should quietly outlive any remaining adversaries.

After 90 years, Jimmy contacts Gellman. When they meet, Gellman kills himself, ending his long life; the next-closest person is Jimmy, another demon, who cannot be possessed.

Another 100 years pass. Jimmy is bored with life, feeling that the best is behind him. Jimmy unexpectedly walks into a trap set by Hunter, who had demonized himself before the lab was destroyed. Following an extended fight and chase, during which Jimmy phones Sweet Pea to warn her, Hunter executes Jimmy.

The OSS find Sweet Pea and imprison her at Osaka Castle, but she is able to send secret messages. Hunter plans to harvest Sweet Pea's blood over several months to make a demon army and replace world leaders. Six months later, he executes her and harvests her remaining blood to complete his army.

Jimmy finds himself conscious but sense-deprived. He reasons that he possessed an unborn fetus. Later, Jimmy is born, possesses an adult, and sends a message to Sweet Pea.

Seven months earlier, Sweet Pea receives Jimmy's warning that Hunter is still alive. She faces a dilemma: the only way to locate Hunter is to be captured, but if she is captured, she will not be able to fight Hunter. She recalls that each possession creates a parallel universe in which the possessor survives the suicide attempt. Sweet Pea possesses an astronaut and suicides in outer space, where the next-closest human is the same astronaut in a parallel universe. She goes to that universe's Earth and finds its Sweet Pea. One of them is captured, and the other receives the prisoner's messages and plans an attack. Months later, the free Sweet Pea receives Jimmy's message and they reunite.

Sweet Pea declares victory, but they both find life boring and decide to stop Hunter. They spend a month training, then create hundreds of duplicates using the entire human population in space. Hours before Hunter's scheduled world takeover, they launch their attack, with high casualties on both sides. The castle gate becomes a killing zone, and Hunter releases failsafes, killing friend and foe. Jimmy directly engages and overpowers Hunter, who orders the lab guards to reinforce him. Distracted, Jimmy is captured by Hunter.

Hunter wants Jimmy to witness his victory, but Sweet Pea has taken over the lab – their actual goal – and exsanguinated one hundred duplicates to demonize every human on Earth. Hunter's agents kill themselves in the planned coup, but there is no one left to possess. Hunter's last failsafes kill everyone at the castle and lab.

Far away from the battle, a Jimmy and a Sweet Pea watch news reports of the events. With everyone a demon and no one to possess, they are all equal and mortal. Sweet Pea is upset at this reality. Jimmy recalls that Gellman had said there was another way to make a possession, and considers the challenge of becoming a good person.

== Development ==
Cartoonist Jason Shiga began working on Demon in 2010 when he had finished his previous title, Empire State. His earlier attempts at creating an epic work had both failed, and Shiga stated that his biggest obstacle to creating Demon was "figuring out how to do it" (emphasis in original).

He usually spends as much time planning a book as he does drawing it, and it took him about three years to write and pencil 720 pages for Demon. In order to construct the puzzles and mathematics in his stories, Shiga wrote from the ending and worked backwards. He felt that he would "get completely lost and fizzle out otherwise." Shiga described the story as "a 3 player chess match that pivots into a series of 7 concentric escape puzzles [with] the chess match itself contained in 2 more layers of puzzles." Shiga sketched the sequence of scenes in reverse as well; this technique made him focus more on story than characterizations. Shiga cut some story arcs while thumbnailing, and rewrote the last chapter twice.

Shiga stated that the biggest influences on Demon were the Quantum Leap television series and the films Groundhog Day and Memoirs of an Invisible Man. Quantum Leap was his favourite show and inspired the possessions in the series, although he disliked that the leaps required performing good deeds. He was similarly disappointed with how good deeds broke the loop in Groundhog Day, feeling that there was no logic to it. Shiga was also inspired by MacGyver, whose title character used intelligence to overcome obstacles with minimal resources, and by Death Note, in which two brilliant minds compete for advantage.

The improvised weapon used to escape the prison was based on a real incident in Japan. (Note: Shiga stated in an interview that the improvised weapon in the prison escape was based on a real incident in Japan. A prisoner had obtained a page from a phone book and laminated it with layers of semen over several months. Once it was stiff and strong, he fashioned it into a blade with which he killed another inmate.) The final showdown at Osaka Castle was inspired by Shiga's visit there on his honeymoon. He was particularly influenced by an artist's interpretation of the Siege of Osaka in isometric perspective.

Shiga placed great importance on negative space in the layouts to control the pacing. The final art was inked in sequence, with coloring done in Photoshop. Although many reviewers have noted that Shiga's simple artistic style contrasts with the wild plots, making them more palatable, Shiga has stated that he did not consciously do this and is critical of his artistic skill, feeling that it is a professional shortcoming. He stated that he tried to make the scenes "tastefully depicted" given the material.

== Publication history ==
In 2013, Shiga submitted Demon to Abrams Books, which was publishing his previous title Empire State. It was rejected, Shiga later noted, due to his "crazy list of demands". Shiga was intransigent about the format and subject matter, and so decided to self-publish. Being solely responsible for production encouraged Shiga to "try every crazy idea I could get away with" – including issues of 4 pages, 60 pages, and one in which every panel was black.

Shiga initially released Demon as a mini-comic, which was a familiar format for him. He printed 400 copies of each issue on a Risograph printer, and mailed them out, believing that this would be the work's final form.

Shiga had been skeptical about webcomics; as an afterthought he put some pages on his website in January 2014, where it gathered a larger following. He decided to continue posting the webcomic as issues of the mini-comic were released. Having the story entirely mapped out made Demon unusually organized for a webcomic, allowing him to publish seven pages per week and to also display a completion bar indicating the comic's progress toward its conclusion. Shiga improvised a little while inking the mini-comic and webcomic, adding to some arcs and cutting others. This resulted in an additional 15 pages compared to his penciled manuscript.

He became an early adopter of Patreon and was receiving $2,000 per month by the completion of the webcomic on 23 May 2016. The earnings and readership convinced publishers that Demon was a marketable title. Shiga received offers and signed with First Second Books.

=== Collections ===
The 21-issue comic was repackaged as a four-part graphic novel (released in four-month intervals during 2016 and 2017) with only small changes to the original material. Shiga stated that it split easily into four volumes, though he had wanted a single 720-page edition.

Vol.	Year	Collects	ISBN	OCLC	Ref
1	2016	#1–5	978-1-6267-2452-5	OCLC 928492035	
2	2017	#6–12	978-1-6267-2453-2	OCLC 940283432	
3	2017	#13–17	978-1-6267-2454-9	OCLC 953844109	
4	2017	#18–21	978-1-6267-2455-6	OCLC 965732202	

In November 2020, a French translation of Demon was released as a 770-page hardcover graphic novel by Cambourakis.

== Narrative and themes ==
Demon is a supernatural action series. Shiga said that Demon is an homage to old superhero comics and to 1990s alternative comics.

In the science-fiction magazine Locus, Shiga wrote that the series was primarily "a story of a man obsessed with the application of logic and science to a seemingly inexplicable supernatural phenomenon." He likened Jimmy's path, from the squalid motel to a palace, to humanity's progress through the cumulative benefits of science and technology. Jimmy uses his reasoning and abundance of time to become the most powerful human in existence.

Shiga stated that immortality and the stability that comes from it allowed examination of what gives meaning to the life of the characters. Shiga has said that as a nihilist, he feels that there is no meaning to anything.

== Reception ==
=== Critical response ===
Writing about the initial installments of the webcomic in 2014, Rob Clough of The Comics Journal noted how Shiga's background in pure mathematics influenced the presentation of his stories as "problems waiting to be solved". He described the webcomic as "a rapidly escalating supernatural action series" which takes as its central theme the implicit nihilism found in Shiga's previous works. Clough praised the "clockwork intricacy" of the plot and the simple lines of the art, with red shades as the only colouring, complementing the "surprisingly visceral and fluid" action scenes.

Dustin Cabeal of Comic Bastards found the plot to be compelling and well-planned, with artwork that conveyed the characters' emotions. He noted that Shiga's writing normalized the carefree violence for which Demon is known, and personally found a great deal of humour in material that might shock other readers. He found the artwork consistent throughout the series, describing it as "simplistic and yet complex" and likening it to an 8-bit video game. Cabreal included the title on his Best of 2016 list. Cabeal felt that the gag humour had lost its impact by the end of the series, but that the story remained compelling and that Demon was unlike anything else he had ever read.

In a review for the New York Journal of Books, Jake Bible called Demon "hilarious, sick, violent, disturbing [and] brilliant". He found that Shiga's simple artistic style, devoid of unnecessary details, complemented the "absurdity and humor" of the story. He recommended it to those who like "over the top violence mixed with sharp humor and tight storytelling".

Paste magazine included Demon on its list of 12 of the most ludicrous comic premises in history. The publication's Sean Edgar wrote that the series stood apart from "murder buffet" titles by its "equally brutal math and nihilism" and "unapologetic intelligence".

Paul Lai of Multiversity Comics called the series "offbeat, hilarious, gloriously crude, and surprisingly touching". Ziah Grace of ComicsAlliance wrote that Demon is unique and unpredictable, with long and intricate story arcs balanced with artwork that allows it to retain its humor. Jason Sacks of Comics Bulletin declared Demon as among "the most outrageously delightful comics to appear in years".

Chris Mautner of The Smart Set wrote that the series brings together elements of mystery, twisted dark humor, and extreme action honed in Shiga's earlier works. He found the narrative consumed with structure and rules, forcing Jimmy to think his way out of dire situations – usually involving unrepentant mayhem. He likened the series to the manga Death Note for its extreme anti-hero, stubborn antagonist, deadly puzzles, and game-changing plot twists. Mautner felt that the series would not have worked so well without its humor and cartoonish art style, which made its darker aspects more palatable.

A review in Publishers Weekly described the writing as "tight and tense", juxtaposed with Shiga's spartan "clip art" style. Graeme McMillan of The Hollywood Reporter noted that the series remained fresh due to sweeping plot twists that cause sudden reversals for the characters. Booklist called the series "smart, bizarre, and irreverent", with a high-stakes plot in which the body count was matched by the crude humor.

The A.V. Club described Demon as having a simple premise which permitted the delivery of "gore, viscera, and rapid-fire carnage". The reviewers felt that the simplicity of the art, with characters drawn to the point of abstraction, made the panels instantly understandable, speeding the pace of reading, and also added to the explosive moments of violence, in which gore is shown in depth and color contrasting with the paper-doll bodies. They found it to be a compelling read with a blend of formalism and simplicity, "result[ing in] something goofy, funny, harrowing and exciting".

=== Nominations and awards ===
Year	Category	Institution or publication	Result	Notes	Ref.
2017	Best Graphic Album — Reprint	Eisner Awards	Won		
2016	Graphic Novel	Los Angeles Times Book Prize	Nominated		
2016	Outstanding Series	Ignatz Award	Nominated		
2014	Outstanding Series	Ignatz Award	Won		
2014	Outstanding Online Comic	Ignatz Award	Nominated		
2018	Audience Prize	Angoulême International Comics Festival	Nominated	Vol. 3	
