= Lars Martinson =

American cartoonist

- Born: 1977 (age 48–49) Minnesota, U.S.
- Notable works: Tōnoharu

Lars Martinson (born 1977) is an American cartoonist.

== Life ==
Lars Martinson was born in 1977 in Minnesota. From 2003 to 2006, he lived and worked in Japan as an assistant English teacher with the JET Program. In 2007, he received a Xeric Grant for Comic Book Self-Publishers that allowed him to work on his graphic novel Tōnoharu. He went back to Japan in 2008 to study East Asian calligraphy with a two-year research scholarship from the Japanese government. He returned to Japan in July 2011 again to work with the JET Program.

== Work ==
Tōnoharu is the story of Dan Wells, an American assistant English teacher in rural Japan. It is inspired by Martinson's experience. It is a self-deprecatory, tender and humorous description of the daily life of an isolated dull unimaginative foreigner in a country whose language he does not master.

== Books ==
- Young Men of a certain Mind, self-published, 2003
- Tōnoharu, Part One, Pliant Press, 2008 (Paperback edition: Top Shelf Productions, September 2014, ISBN 978-0980102369).
- Tōnoharu, Part Two, Pliant Press, 2010
  - Tonoharu (French translation of both volumes), Le lézard noir, 2011
- Tōnoharu, Part Three, Pliant Press, November 2016, ISBN 978-0980102314.
