= Juliacks =

American dramatist

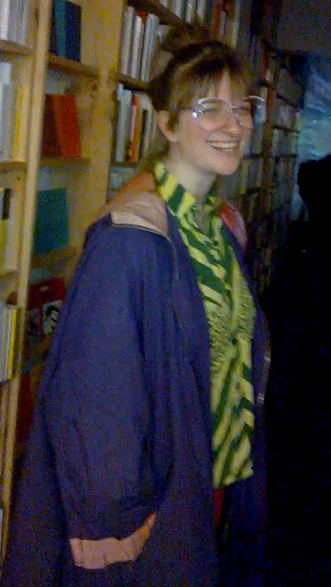
- Born: Julia C. K. Stein; April 9, 1986 (age 40)
- Known for: artist, filmmaker, performer-choreographer, cartoonist, playwright
- Notable work: Architecture of An Atom
- Website: juliacks.com

Juliacks (born April 9, 1986) is an American artist, filmmaker, performer-choreographer, cartoonist, and playwright living in the U.S. and the Netherlands.

Her feature film, performance, and comics project, Architecture of An Atom, has been presented at the Moderna Museum of Malmö & Stockholm, the Musee d'art Contemporain of Lyon, Centre d'Art Contemporain of Geneve, the Kiasma Museum of Art with the Helsinki Comics Festival, ALT_CPH in Copenhagen and other contexts in France, Canada, Denmark, Italy, and Portugal.

Juliacks' comics work has been published in independent magazines and anthologies, including The Graphic Canon, Lumpen magazine, Insect Bath, Zeroquatre, Kutikuti, Windy Corner and Unicorn Mountain, in 2009, Sparkplug Comics published her collaboration with Olga Volazova, the comic book Rock That Never Sleeps. While in Finland on a Fulbright Grant for performance art, she made the comic art book and film Invisible Forces, that was taken on tour. Her graphic novel Swell premiered as a play at Culture Project's Women Center Stage Festival March 2012 in New York.
