= Marguerite Dabaie =

Palestinian-American illustrator

Marguerite Dabaie is a Palestinian-American illustrator and comic book artist. They are the author of the graphic novel The Hookah Girl and Other True Stories and the fantasy novel Legends in the Heights (2026).

== Early life and education ==
Dabaie was raised in San Francisco. Their grandparents were from Palestine. Dabaie attended the School of Visual Arts in New York City, graduating in 2007.

== Career ==
Dabaie illustrates for numerous publications. They are also an editor of the Journal of Palestine Studies.

In 2007, Dabaie wrote and illustrated the semi-biographical graphic novel The Hookah Girl and Other True Stories exploring aspects of their life as a Palestinian Christian American. After over 10 years working on the illustrations that make up the book, Dabaie obtained 2 grants which allowed the book to be published in 2018.

In 2020, Dabaie wrote and illustrated a short story about the Palestinian-American congresswoman Rashida Tlaib for the DC Comics anthology Wonder Women of History. The same year, they illustrated a short story in the book PANDEMIX: Quarantine Comics in the Age of ‘Rona.

== Critical reception ==
Of their book, The Hookah Girl and Other True Stories, the Routledge Handbook on Women in the Middle East said "Dabaie explores themes such as ethnic belonging... non-conformity to “traditional” gender roles, and [their] incompetence at seemingly banal tasks [their] Palestinian family members effortlessly perform."

The Comics Journal said "Dabaie’s work exploits the fine line between ‘political’ and ‘humanitarian’ with humor."

Meanwhile, researcher Dr. Dekel Shay Schory, speaking to Haaretz, said Dabaie "write[s] about their divided identity and about what it is like to be Palestinian in the U.S. Their social commentary is not directed at the Arab world, but at the way in which American society has been viewing them".

Pop Matters called the book "an intentionally scattered memoir in comic strip form of a childhood and young adulthood navigating the cultural hazards of growing up Palestinian in the US".

== Personal life ==
Dabaie uses they/them pronouns.

== Works ==
- Legends in the Heights (2026) Andrews McMeel Publishing. ISBN 979-8881611729
- Pandemix (2020).
- Wonder Women of History (2020) DC Comics.
- The Hookah Girl and Other True Stories. (2018) Rosarium Publishing. ISBN 978-0998705927
- Dabaie, Margueritte. "Nell's women." The Women's Review of Books, July–August 2010, 17.
- Unsichtbares/Sichtbares: Your Guide to Fashionable Living
