= David Lasky =

American alternative cartoonist

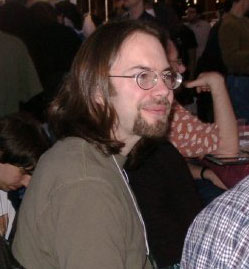
- Lasky photographed at the 2003 Alternative Press Expo (APE) in San Francisco, California
- Born: David Lasky Washington, D.C.
- Areas: Cartoonist, Penciller
- Notable works: Urban Hipster, Boom Boom
- Awards: Xeric Award, 1993

David Lasky is an alternative cartoonist based in Seattle, Washington.

== Biography ==
After spending the bulk of his early life in Virginia, and graduating from the College of William & Mary, Lasky moved to Seattle in 1992. He quickly found a circle of young comic book artists—including Megan Kelso, Tom Hart, Ed Brubaker, Jon Lewis, and Jason Lutes—drawing and publishing their own work. With them, Lasky aspired to take clichéd or neglected genres of comics and revitalize them with the lessons learned from the first wave of alternative comics.

Lasky's first two full-length comic books, Arrabbiata Comics and Monster City Comics, were created in collaboration with printmaker Paul Bonelli under the name Fistball Productions. In 1993, Lasky won a grant from the Xeric Foundation to self–publish his comic Boom Boom. With this nudge, Boom Boom graduated from its minicomic format, added a color cover, and began to take on its mature form as part history, part graphic novel, part surreal cartography. In 1994–1995, Aeon Publications published four issues of Boom Boom. Lasky used the layout style of Jack Kirby for the James Joyce biography in Boom Boom #2.

Throughout the 90s, Pulse! magazine (a now defunct publication of Tower Records) published a series of Lasky's comic biographies and musical impressions. These full-page cartoons were collages of image, text and story that stretched the limits of comic art and became a kind of visual essay. Those featured included Beethoven, Bob Dylan, and legendary saxophonist Lester Young.

Lasky's contribution to the comic book anthology Two–Fisted Science (written by Jim Ottaviani) chronicles the life of physicist Richard Feynman during his time with the Manhattan Project at the Los Alamos National Laboratory.

Lasky continued to push the boundaries of traditional comics in his collaborations with Greg Stump — Urban Hipster (published by Alternative Comics), which was nominated in 1999 for the Harvey Award for best new series, and the second issue of which was nominated for the Ignatz Award for Outstanding Comic in 2003.

Lasky illustrated Don't Forget This Song, a graphic novel biography of the Carter Family, written with Frank Young. (An excerpt of the book was published in Kramers Ergot volume 4.) The book was published in 2012 by Abrams Books, and it was joint-winner of the 2013 Eisner Award for Best Reality-Based Work.

Lasky has been nominated for numerous Ignatz Awards, and has also served on the Ignatz Award jury.
