= Jason Little (cartoonist) =

American cartoonist

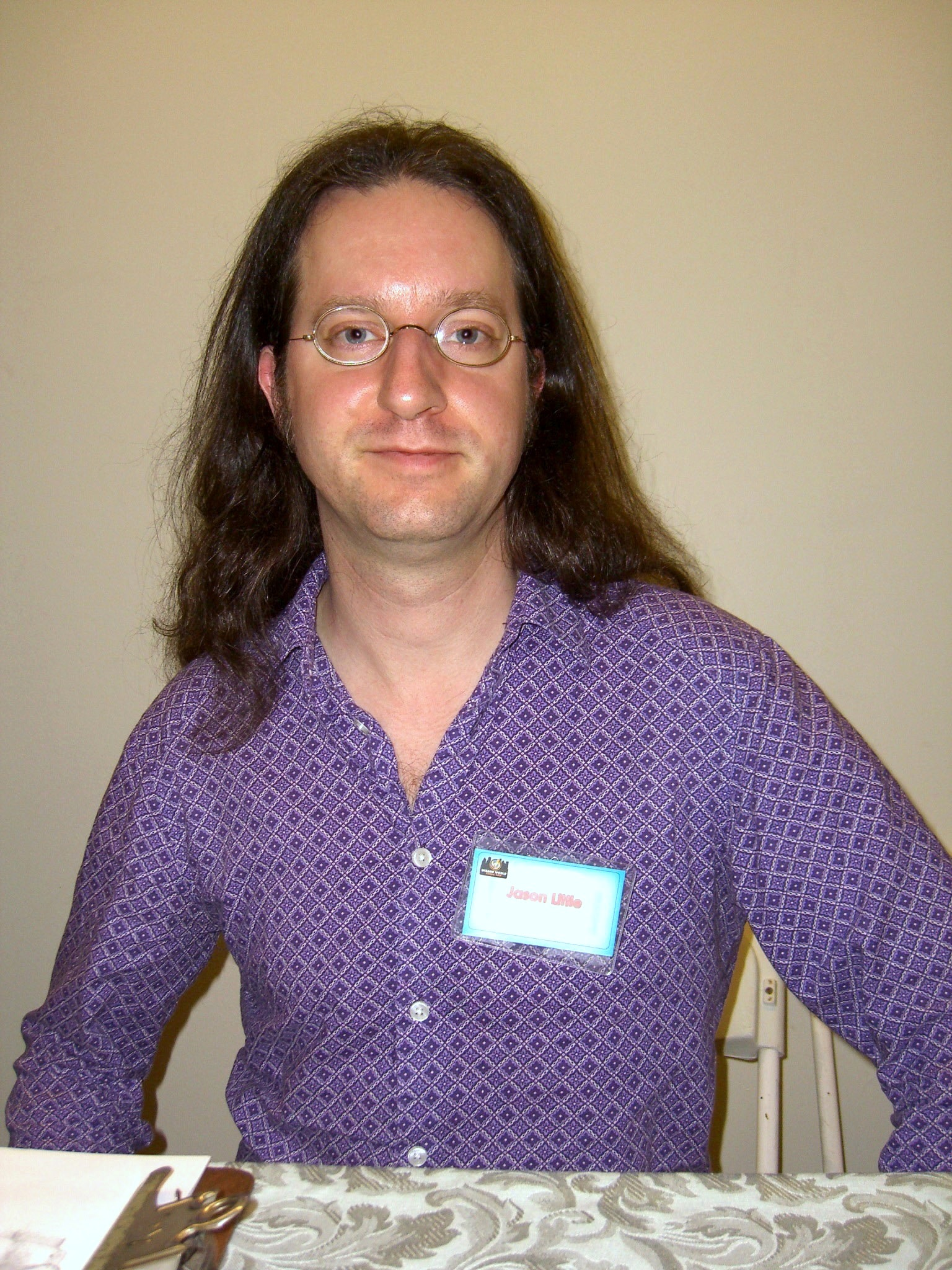
- Little at the Big Apple Convention, May 21, 2011.
- Born: Jason Palmer Little; 1970 (age 55–56)
- Areas: Cartoonist, Colourist
- Notable works: Shutterbug Follies
- Awards: Xeric Award, 1998

Jason Palmer Little (born 1970) is an American cartoonist.

He grew up in Binghamton, New York, studied photography at Oberlin College, and now lives in Brooklyn with writer Myla Goldberg and their two daughters.

Little's first graphic novel, Shutterbug Follies (ISBN 0-385-50346-6), a mystery adventure featuring his heroine Bee, was originally serialized in free weekly papers and on the Internet. The series' online incarnation won the 2002 Ignatz Award for Outstanding Online Comic. Little began a new Bee series, Motel Art Improvement Service in February 2005; it was collected and published in hardcover by Dark Horse Originals in 2010. His other work includes short pieces for various cartoon anthologies, and the Xeric Foundation award-winning one-issue comic book Jack's Luck Runs Out.
