= Gareth Hinds =

British electrochemist

Gareth Hinds FREng FIMMM
- Alma mater: Trinity College Dublin
- Awards: IOM3 Gold Medal (2024); Rutherford Prize (2014); Christian Friedrich Schönbein Medal (2013)
- Scientific career
- Fields: Electrochemistry and Corrosion
- Workplaces: National Physical Laboratory; University College London; University of Strathclyde

Gareth Hinds is a British scientist specialising in electrochemistry, corrosion and materials degradation. He is a Senior Fellow and Science Area Leader in Electrochemistry at the UK's National Physical Laboratory (NPL). He was elected a Fellow of the Royal Academy of Engineering in 2019 and received the Institute of Materials, Minerals and Mining (IOM3) Gold Medal in 2024.

== Education and career ==
Hinds graduated from Trinity College Dublin with a degree in experimental physics in 1996 and completed a PhD in electrochemistry in 2000. His doctoral research examined magnetic field effects on the electrodeposition and dissolution of copper.

Hinds joined NPL in 2002, where his research has focused on corrosion, electrochemical energy technologies and measurement methods for assessing materials degradation. His work includes the development of diagnostic techniques for fuel cells, electrolysers and lithium-ion batteries. He holds visiting academic appointments at University College London, the University of Strathclyde and Harbin Institute of Technology.

Hinds served as president of the Institute of Corrosion from 2018 to 2020 and became president of the European Federation of Corrosion in 2025. He has contributed to international standards activities concerning corrosion, hydrogen technologies and batteries.

== Honours and awards ==
Hinds received the Christian Friedrich Schönbein Medal in 2013 and the NPL Rutherford Prize in 2014. He was elected a Fellow of the Royal Academy of Engineering in 2019 for his contributions to corrosion diagnostics and materials degradation research. In 2024, he received the IOM3 Gold Medal for contributions to materials science and engineering.
