= Jack Hsu (artist) =

American artist

Jack Hsu is an American storyboard artist and animation director. He is the creator of Way Out Comics, an independent publisher of comic books and graphic novels. He's also the co-founder of SupaPop Studios, an IP Incubator, with artist Sean Danconia.

== Early life ==
Hsu was born in Taiwan and raised in Japan and the United States.

He developed an interest for drawing at age 3, and read manga and comic books growing up in Japan.

He received degrees in architecture from U.C. Berkeley and Yale, and discovered the world of movie making when he was designing the commissary at Culver Studios. It rekindled his love of storytelling and steered his career path towards live action and animation movies.

== Career ==
Hsu worked as an architect for five years before pursuing his childhood passion of narrative art.

He worked for a few years in TV animation and designed the characters for The Incredible Hulk and The Mummy series.

He then became a storyboard artist working in live-actions films. Some blockbuster films he worked on include: Stuart Little 2, Spider-Man 2, and The Haunted Mansion. Later he joined Sony Pictures Animation to work on Open Season and Cloudy with a Chance of Meatballs.

In 2013, he joined Francis Kao, formerly head of Imagi Studios, and his newly founded Unicorn Studios in Hong Kong to direct and develop animation films for. Around the same time, he consulted with Mass Animation on "Blazing Samurai", which was released theatrically in 2022 as "Paws Of Fury".

In 2015, he joined Warner Animation Group as the Head of Story on Lego Batman. That same year, his graphic novel "8-9-3" was optioned by HBO to be developed by Michael Mann into a live-action series.

In 2017, he joined Riot Games as a story consultant for its film and TV development division. Among the many projects he was involved with was "Arcane", the critically acclaimed series on Netflix.

== Awards ==
Hsu won the Xeric Grant award twice, first for Poppie's Adventures, and again for 8–9–3, an action-packed graphic novel about the criminal underworld of Japanese Yakuza.

== Personal life ==
Hsu is married to Julie Yeh, whom he met when they were both in graduate schools in the East Coast. The couple live in Los Angeles and have two daughters.
