= Whit Taylor (cartoonist) =

American cartoonist

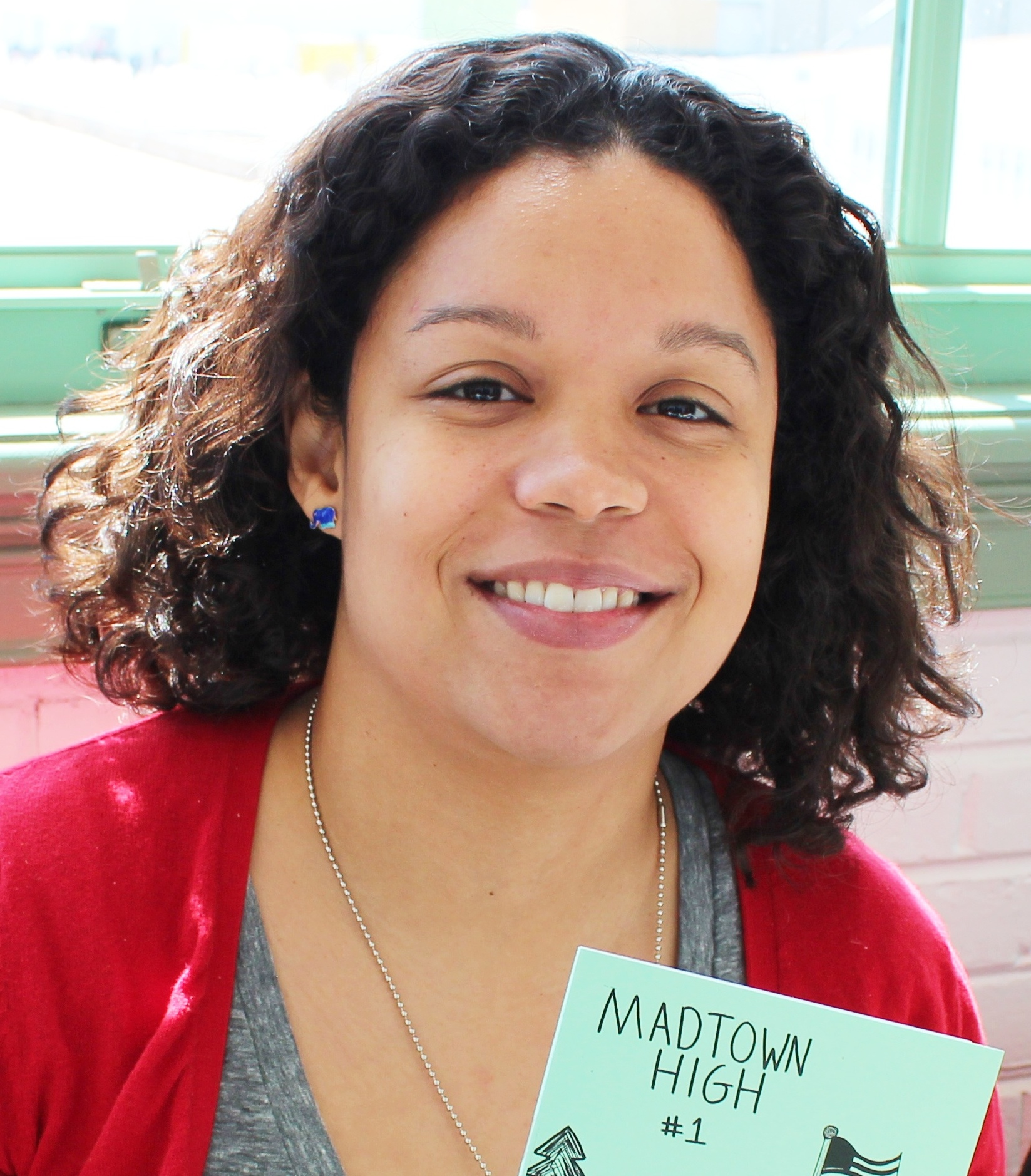
Taylor at the Asbury Park Comicon in 2013

Whit Taylor is an American cartoonist.

Taylor grew up in New Jersey and is based in New York. She has a background in public health, having earned a MPH and then worked in public health. She pursued film before turning to comics after attending a number of comics conventions and shows. She has contributed to The Comics Beat, The Comics Journal, and other comics news outlets, including The Nib. In 2014 she was a juror for the Ignatz Awards.

== Recognition ==
Awards and nominations for Whit Taylor
Year	Organisation	Award	Work	Result
2012	Glyph Comics Awards	Rising Star Award	Watermelon	Won
2013	Ignatz Awards	Best Series	Madtown High	Nominated
2014	Glyph Comics Awards	Best Writer	Boxes	Nominated
2014	Glyph Comics Awards	Fan Award for Best Work	Boxes	Nominated
2015	Best American Comics 2015	Notable Comic	Boxes	Nominated
2016	Slate	Slate Cartoonist Studio Prize Short List for Best Web Comic of the Year	The Fabric of Appropriation	Nominated

== Works ==
- Watermelon (2011, self-published)
- Relics (2012, self-published)
- Madtown High (2013, self-published five-issue series)
- Stethoscope Microphone (2013, self-published)
- Boxes (2013, self-published)
- The Anthropologists (2014, Sparkplug Books)
- Berries (2014, self-published)
- Up Down Clown (2015, Ninth Art Press)
- Ghost (2015, self-published)
- Wallpaper (2016, Self-published)
- Ghost Stories (2018, Rosarium Press)
- Ley Lines No. 17: Smile (Czap Books/Grindstone Press, 2019)
- Fizzle Series (2017-, Radiator Comics)
- Montana Diary (2021, Silver Sprocket)
