= Shutterbug Follies =

Graphic novel by Jason Little

- Doubleday cover

Publication information
- Publisher: Doubleday
- Format: Ongoing series

Creative team
- Created by: Jason Little

Shutterbug Follies is a graphic novel created by Jason Little. The book was released as a weekly webcomic and newspaper series, and was published in its entirety by Doubleday in 2002. The series continued in 2005 under the title Motel Art Improvement Service.

== Plot ==
The book features the character Bee, who is a photographer and photo lab technician. She is just out of high school, and has taken a job at a one-hour photo lab in lower Manhattan. She has the habit of copying interesting photos that she develops. Bee begins to investigate some of her clients when she develops the pictures of several dead bodies. She begins to suspect Oleg Khatchatourian, a crime scene photographer, has murdered his wife when she turns up dead after Bee witnesses a fight between the two.

== Reception ==
=== Awards ===
The series won an Ignatz Award in 2002 for Outstanding Online Comic, another Ignatz Award in 2003 for Outstanding Artist, and was nominated for a Harvey Award in 2003 for Best Graphic Album of Original Work.

=== Criticism ===
Shutterbug Follies has been reviewed favorably by Publishers Weekly and the School Library Journal. Mark Frauenfelder, reviewing the webcomic for Playboy, called the artwork "superb". The book was banned in a Texas high school, citing profanity and sexual content.

== Style ==
Little uses several techniques in Shutterbug Follies to draw comparison to photography. A few panels imitate the style of a fisheye lens. Several others use rounded borders that are similar to old-fashioned photographs. The shape of the book itself is suggestive of a photo album. Little utilizes colors strongly in the book. Photo-negative colors are used extensively, and can be seen on the cover. The narrative style has been likened to a mix between Rear Window and Ghost World. Little has described the book as "bubblegum noir".
