= Julia Gfrörer =

American cartoonist

- Born: September 12, 1982 (age 44); Concord, New Hampshire, U.S.
- Occupations: Cartoonist; Illustrator; writer
- Known for: Flesh and Bone (2010); Black Is The Color (2013); Laid Waste (2016)

Julia Gfrörer (born September 12, 1982) is an American cartoonist, graphic novelist, illustrator, and author. Her work is often transgressive, invoking occult themes within an ambience of subtly observed historicist concerns, in narratives generally characterized by "mumblecore dialogue, persistent overtones of horror and suffering, and unapologetic sexuality."

== Background ==
Gfrörer graduated from Cornish College with a BFA in printmaking. Her thesis show explored depictions of martyrdom – a subject she has returned to frequently in later works (e.g. How Life Became Unbearable, Palm Ash, Martyrdom: A Coloring Book). Moving to Portland after graduation, she met Dylan Williams (founder of Sparkplug Comics) in the process of consigning her DIY mini-comic about St. Francis of Assisi at the Pony Club Gallery where he happened to be working. He became Gfrörer's first publisher. Her first full-length comic, Flesh & Bone (2010), was nominated for an Ignatz Award for outstanding achievement in the form, and was excerpted in The Best American Comics (2011) anthology shortly thereafter.

== Career ==
Flesh & Bone by Julia Gfrörer, 2010. Published by Sparkplug.

Gfrörer has been twice nominated for the Ignatz Award and twice featured as a contributor in Best American Comics.

After experimenting with self-publishing and working with a number of smaller presses (Sparkplug, Study Group etc.), Gfrörer's second graphic novella, Black Is The Color, was published at Fantagraphics after being digitally serialized on the Study Group Comics website. Fantagraphics published her book about the Black Death, Laid Waste, in 2016 which was released to general critical acclaim.

Gfrörer appeared in Fantagraphics' Next Wave panel alongside colleagues Simon Hanselmann, Anya Davidson, Benjamin Marra, and Noah Van Sciver in 2016. She's also presented at PEN America's "Transcendent Obscenity" panel, and at the Parsons School of Art & Design while teaching workshops at SAW and exhibiting work at MoCCA and elsewhere.

While Fantagraphics publishes Gfrörer's major works, she continues to publish shorter works and collaborations under her own imprint, Thuban Press.

Gfrörer and Sean T. Collins (her partner & frequent collaborator) were selected to curate and edit the second volume of 2D Cloud's annual anthology Mirror, Mirror in 2017. More recently Analog Self-Publishing has been released as a starter-kit for aspiring zine and comic book artists, the Vision tetralogy, and All-Fucked Up (in collaboration with Sean T. Collins & Felker-Martin).

== Selected works ==
=== Graphic novellas ===
- Flesh and Bone (2010): after returning from a black mass, a witch meets a forlorn young man who has come to ask for her aid in reuniting him with his dead lover. Selected by Alison Bechdel for inclusion in Best American Comics 2011.
- Black is the Color (2013): a 17th century sailor abandoned at sea by his shipmates endures, and eventually succumbs to, both his lingering death sentence and the advances of an amorous mermaid.
- Laid Waste (2017): as corpses accumulate around her in a plague-ravaged medieval city, a young widow named Agnès must weigh her obligations to the dead and dying against her desire to protect what little remains.

=== Minicomics ===
- Vision (Vol. I-IV)
- Analog Self-Publishing
- Dark Age: a pair of lovers in a primeval age explore a deep cave.
- Palm Ash: a doomed love story set during the Diocletianic Persecution. Selected by Jonathan Lethem for inclusion in Best American Comics, 2015.
- Too Dark to See: a relationship is slowly broken apart by succubi.
- Black Light: collects the short stories "River of Tears", "All is Lost", "Unclean", and "Phosphorus".
- Goodnight Seattle: morbid visions of Frasier.
- Ariadne auf Naxos I, II, and III (Floating World Comics): short comic strips.
- All the Ancient Kings: imagined interactions between (mostly) dead artists.
- How Life Became Unbearable: a story involving Francis of Assisi.

=== Collaborations ===
- In Pace Requiescat, The Hideous Dropping Away of the Veil, The Deep Ones, and Hiders by Sean T. Collins, illustrated by Julia Gfrörer
- Martyrdom: A Coloring Book by Hallie Fryd, illustrated by Julia Gfrörer
- All Fucked-Up: Tales from the Roadhouse (Expanded Universe), featuring Julia Gfrorer, Sean T. Collins, Gretchen Felker-Martin

=== Other publications ===
- Mirror, Mirror II edited by Julia Gfrörer and Sean T. Collins (including "Heroic Devices" by Claude Paradin, translated and illustrated by Julia Gfrörer)
- No End Will Be Found by Gretchen Felker-Martin (published by Thuban)
- Symbol Reader (at The Comics Journal)
- World Within the World - Collected Short Comix 2010-2021 (2025) (published by Fantagraphics)

=== Anthology appearances ===
- Best American Comics, 2011 ed. by Alison Bechdel ("Fear of Fire" excerpted from Flesh & Bone)
- Best American Comics, 2015 ed. by Jonathan Lethem ("Palm Ash")
- Kramer's Ergot #9 ed. by Sammy Harkham ("Four Thieves")
- Mammoth Book of Cult Comics ("Too Dark To See")
- Cringe: An Anthology of Embarrassment
- Black Eye #3

=== Album Covers ===
- Ire Adrift, 2011 (debut album by Ire Adrift)
