= Jason Shiga =

American cartoonist (born 1976)

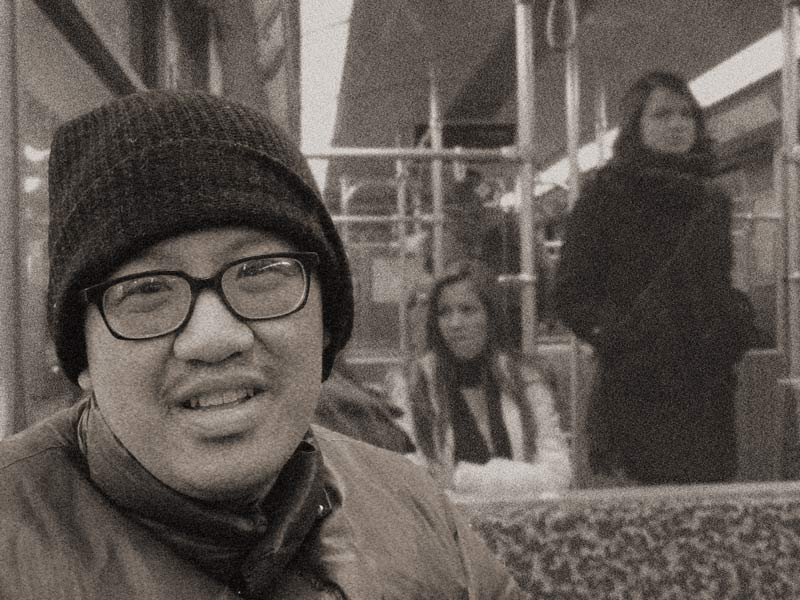
- Jason Shiga in Berlin in 2008.
- Born: 1976 (age 49–50) Oakland, California, U.S.
- Area: Cartoonist
- Notable works: Meanwhile, Fleep, Demon
- Awards: Xeric Award, 1999; Eisner Award, 2004; Ignatz Award, 2004; Stumptown Comics Award, 2007

Jason Shiga (born 1976) is an American cartoonist who incorporates puzzles, mysteries and unconventional narrative techniques into his work.

== Early life ==
Jason Shiga is from Oakland, California. His father, Seiji Shiga, was an animator who worked on the 1964 Rankin-Bass production Rudolph the Red-Nosed Reindeer. Jason Shiga was a pure mathematics major at the University of California at Berkeley, from which he graduated in 1998.

== Career ==
Shiga is credited as the "Maze Specialist" for Issue #18 (Winter 2005/2006) of the literary journal McSweeney's Quarterly, which features a solved maze on the front cover and a (slightly different) unsolved maze on the back. The title page of each story in the journal is headed by a maze segment labeled with numbers leading to the first pages of other stories.

Shiga has also drawn and written several comics and illustrated features for Nickelodeon Magazine, some of which feature his original creations, and some starring Nickelodeon characters such as SpongeBob SquarePants and the Fairly OddParents.

Shiga makes a cameo appearance in the Derek Kirk Kim comic Ungrateful Appreciation as a Rubik's Cube-solving nerd.

=== Techniques and materials ===
According to the rear credits page of Empire State: A Love Story, Shiga, who was inspired by an actual Greyhound Bus trip from Oakland to New York to create that story, pencilled it with a yellow No. 2 pencil on copy paper. He then inked it with a lightbox and a 222 size Winsor & Newton brush, and lettered it with a Micron 08 felt-tip pen. The colors were applied digitally by John Pham. His book Meanwhile uses a system of branching tubes that connect panels to make an interactive story.

== Awards ==
=== Won ===
- 2019 Gran Guinigi winner: Best Series, Demon.
- 2017 Eisner Comic Industry Award winner: Best Graphic Album-Reprint, Demon
- 2014 Ignatz Award winner: Outstanding Series, Demon.
- 2007 Stumptown Comics Award winner: Best Writing, Bookhunter.
- 2003 Ignatz Award winner: Outstanding Story, Fleep.
- 2003 Eisner Comic Industry Award winner: Talent Deserving of Wider Recognition.
- 1999 Xeric Award winner: Double Happiness.

=== Nominated ===
- 2018 Angouleme Festival Sélection Officielle, Demon.
- 2018 Angouleme Festival Prix du Public, Demon.
- 2016 Los Angeles Times Book Prize nominee: Graphic Novel/Comics, Demon.
- 2016 Ignatz Award nominee: Outstanding Series, Demon.
- 2014 Ignatz Award nominee: Outstanding Webcomic, Demon.
- 2012 Harvey Award nominee: Best Letterer, Best Inker, Best Writer, Best Artist, Empire State.
- 2011 Harvey Award nominee: Best Original Graphic Publication for Younger Readers, Meanwhile.
- 2007 Eisner Comic Industry Award nominee: Best Graphic Album, Bookhunter.
- 2007 Ignatz Award nominee: Outstanding Graphic Novel, Bookhunter.
- 2004 Eisner Comic Industry Award nominee: Best Single Issue or One-Shot, Fleep.

== Bibliography ==
=== Books ===
- Double Happiness, 2000 Shigabooks
- Fleep, 2002 Sparkplug Comics
- Bookhunter, 2007 Sparkplug Comics (French translation, éditions Cambourakis, 2008)
- Meanwhile, 2010 Amulet Books (French translation as Vanille ou chocolat, éditions Cambourakis, 2012)
- Empire State - A Love Story (or Not), 2011 Abrams
- Demon, Volume 1, 2016 First Second
- Demon, Volume 2, 2017 First Second
- Demon, Volume 3, 2017 First Second
- Demon, Volume 4, 2017 First Second
- Adventuregame Comics: Leviathan, 2022 Amulet Books (French translation as Leviathan, éditions Cambourakis, 2022), ISBN 978-1-4197-5779-2
- Adventuregame Comics: The Beyond, 2023 Amulet Books
- Adventuregame Comics: Samurai vs. Ninja, 2024 Abrams

=== Self-published minicomics ===
- Phillip's Head, 1997
- The Adventures of Doorknob Bob, 1997
- Mortimer Mouse, 1997
- The Family Circus (parody), 1997
- The Last Supper, 1997
- Grave of the Crickets, 1998
- The Bum's Rush, 1998
- The Date, 1999
- Meanwhile..., 2001
- Hello World, 2003
- Bus Stop, 2004
- Knock Knock, 2006
