= Tom Hart (cartoonist) =

American comics creator (born 1969)

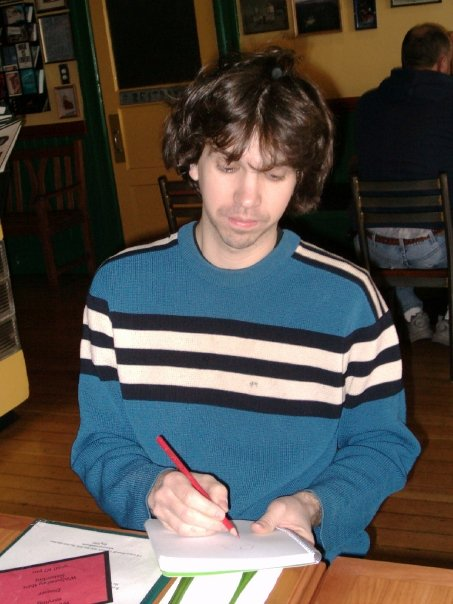
- Hart, photographed at the 2003 Alternative Press Expo (APE) in San Francisco
- Born: October 8, 1969 (age 57) Kingston, New York
- Areas: Cartoonist, Writer, Penciller, Inker, Letterer
- Notable works: Hutch Owen; Rosalie Lightning
- Awards: Xeric Award, 1994

Tom Hart (born October 8, 1969, in Kingston, New York) is an American comics creator and educator best known for his graphic novel Rosalie Lightning and his Hutch Owen series of comics. He is the co-founder of SAW, the Sequential Artists Workshop.

== Career ==
Tom Hart began making mini-comics while living in Seattle in the early 1990s. Like many of his colleagues including Megan Kelso, Dave Lasky, Jason Lutes, Jon Lewis, and James Sturm, he was an early recipient of the Xeric Foundation grant for cartoonists.

His Xeric-winning book, Hutch Owen's Working Hard was 56 pages and self-published in 1994.

Hart returned to the Hutch Owen series and published a first collection of stories with Top Shelf Productions in 2000. Later books in the series have also been published by Top Shelf. Time magazine called Hutch Owen "A devastating satire [which] feels like a scalding hot poker cauterizing the open wound of American corporate and consumer culture."

Hutch Owen was also distributed as daily print and webcomic strips, and Hart is a former editor of and contributor to Serializer.net. One of the original comics on Serializer was Trunktown, a Hutch Owen spin-off drawn by Hart and written by Shaenon Garrity. His strip version of Hutch Owen, ran in the Metro newspaper in New York and Boston for a year and a half from 2006-2008.

In 2008 his comic strip collaboration with Marguerite Dabaie, Ali's House, was bought and syndicated by King Features Syndicate. The strip is now archived at GoComics.

Tom Hart is also an experienced teacher, having taught for more than ten years at New York's School of Visual Arts, Parsons, the Education Alliance, Young Audiences, numerous places across the country and all over New York City. In 2011, he and his cartoonist wife, Leela Corman, moved to Gainesville, Florida, and founded the Sequential Artists Workshop.

In 2012 he published Daddy Lightning, about his experiences as a father. In January 2016 he published Rosalie Lightning, a memoir named after his daughter, who had died suddenly when she was almost two, and about his and his wife's grief and their attempts to make sense of their life afterwards. Rosalie Lightning was named The Washington Post's Best Graphic Novel of 2016 and one of Publishers Weekly's 100 Best Books of 2016. Kirkus Reviews called the book, "A bracing, deeply saddening journey into death and loss whose wryly affirmative resolution, ‘joy breaking through the storm clouds,’ is nothing but hard won."

== Personal life ==
Hart is married to fellow cartoonist Leela Corman. Since the death of their daughter Rosalie, the couple have since had another child.

== Awards ==
- 1994 Xeric Award
- 1997 (nomination) Ignatz Award for Promising New Talent
- 2000 (nomination) Ignatz Award for Outstanding Graphic Novel or Collection, for Banks/Eubanks
- 2001 (nomination) Ignatz Award for Outstanding Story, for "Stocks Are Surging", in The Collected Hutch Owen (Note: The 2001 Ignatz Awards were after canceled after the September 11 attacks.)
- 2002 (nomination) Ignatz Award for Outstanding Online Comic, for Hutch Owen: Public Relations
- 2005 (nomination) Ignatz Award for Outstanding Anthology or Collection, for Hutch Owen: Unmarketable
- 2013 (nomination) Ignatz Award for Outstanding Story, for “Arid,” in Secret Prison #7
- 2017 (nomination) Eisner Award for Best Reality-Based Work, for Rosalie Lightning

== Bibliography ==
- Hutch Owen's Working Hard (self-published, 1994)
- New Hat (Black Eye Productions, 1995)
- The Sands: A Picture Story (Black Eye, 1997) ISBN 978-0-9698874-8-5
- Banks/Eubanks: New Hat Stories (Top Shelf, 1999) ISBN 978-1-891830-10-5
- Hutch Owen vol. 1: The Collected (Top Shelf Productions, 2000) ISBN 978-1-891830-17-4
- Hutch Owen vol. 2 Unmarketable! (Top Shelf, 2004) ISBN 978-1-891830-55-6
- Hutch Owen vol. 3: Let's Get Furious (Top Shelf, 2010) ISBN 978-1-60309-086-5
- How to Say Everything (Sequential Artists Workshop, 2011) ISBN 978-0999674314
- Daddy Lightning (Retrofit Comics, 2012)
- Rosalie Lightning: A Graphic Memoir (St. Martin's Press, 2016) ISBN 978-1250049940
- She's Not Into Poetry: Mini-Comics 1991-1996 (Alternative Comics, 2016) ISBN 978-1934460887
- The Sequential Artists Workshop Guide to Creating Professional Comic Strips (Alternative Comics, 2016) ISBN 978-1934460894
- The Art of the Graphic Memoir: Tell Your Story, Change Your Life (St. Martin's Griffin, 2018 ISBN 978-1250113344
