= Jeff Nicholson =

American comic book writer (born 1962)

- Born: October 5, 1962 (age 64) United States
- Area: Writer

Jeff Nicholson (born October 5, 1962) is an American comic book writer, artist and self-publisher, known primarily for his work on Ultra Klutz, Through the Habitrails, Father & Son, and Colonia. Nicholson received a total of six Comics Industry Eisner Award nominations in his 25-year career, and was one of the first four recipients of the Xeric Award comic book self-publishing grants in 1992.

== 1981–1989 ==
Nicholson's first self-published title was a 1981 underground comic book Ultra Klutz, which used humor and satire. He later published 31 issues of a more mainstream Ultra Klutz comic in the direct sales market under his Onward Comics imprint. Ultra Klutz was “a comic that began as a parody of Japanese superstar Ultraman but soon evolved into a convoluted and complex fantasy soap opera. All issues of Ultra Klutz were acquired from Alexander Street Press and are available digitally to the library market worldwide. During this period Nicholson also issued the 60 page Nicholson’s Small Press Tirade, a “A critical examination and critique of the small press scene of the 1980's in comics form,” which was selected for inclusion in the Treasury of Mini-Comics Vol. 2 from Fantagraphics Books in 2015.

== 1990–1997 ==
Nicholson made a major career shift with Through the Habitrails, in which “There is a frightening internal logic to Nicholson’s stories that is the hallmark of the best of horror. This series of surreal, dark humored short stories about life in the corporate world of commercial illustration was first published in four volumes of Stephen R. Bissette’s Taboo (comics) anthology (alongside Alan Moore and Eddie Campbell’s From Hell series), and elevated Nicholson from a relatively cult-like status to receiving more substantial coverage in the comics journalism and mainstream media of the time. His comics were also published by various larger or more mainstream publishers from 1992-1997, including Hyena magazine (Tundra Publishing), Negative Burn (Caliber Comics), The Big Book of Little Criminals, The Big Book of Losers (DC Comics / Paradox Press), The Dreaming (Vertigo (DC Comics)., and Father & Son, a four issue series published by Kitchen Sink Press, depicting “the misadventures of a slacker Gen-Xer and his type-A boomer dad… nominated for two Eisner Awards (the Oscars of comics, as people in the industry like to call them)… depicting the ironies of mundane everyday life".

== 1998–2005 ==
Nicholson returned to self-publishing with Colonia, an all-ages fantasy adventure series. In the series, the setting in the New World contained real geography and alternative history considerations. “As an artist, Jeff Nicholson adopts a lean, earnestly straightforward approach... he conveys genuine enthusiasm for both his characters and for the legendary age of exploration which frames their adventures.” Nicholson was selected as a featured creator for the book Character Design for Graphic Novels (Focal Press) based on his Colonia characters.

== 2016 ==
After a ten-year absence from comics, Nicholson came out of retirement to create a new ten page Epilogue to his acclaimed Through the Habitrails for a third edition of the book from Dover Publications.

== Works ==
- Nicholson, Jeff. Through the Habitrails. Chico, Calif: Bad Habit, 1996. ISBN 9781885047038
- Nicholson, Jeff. Colonia: Islands and Anomalies. San Francisco, CA: AiT/PlanetLar, 2002. ISBN 9780970936073
- Nicholson, Jeff. Nicholson's Small Press Tirade and Other Works, 1983-1989: Obscure Short Stories. Chico, CA: Bad Habit, 1994. ISBN 9781885047014
- Nicholson, Jeff. Colonia: On into the Great Lands. San Francisco, CA: AiT/PlanetLar, 2005. ISBN 9781932051407
- Ultra Klutz (Journal) Chico, CA : Onward Comics. 1986-1991
- Nicholson, Jeff. Through the Habitrails, Life Before and After My Career In the Cubicles. Mineola, New York: Dover Publications, Inc., 2016. ISBN 9780486802862
