= Karl Stevens =

American artist

- Born: November 21, 1978 (age 48) Concord, Massachusetts, U.S.
- Areas: Writer, Penciller, Inker
- Notable works: Penny: A Graphic Memoir; The Lodger; The Winner
- Awards: Xeric Award, 2004; Association of Alternative Newsweeklies award for Best Cartoon, 2010

Karl Stevens (born November 21, 1978) is an American graphic novelist and painter. Best known for Penny: A Graphic Memoir (2021 Chronicle Books). His comic strips have appeared in the alternative newsweekly the Boston Phoenix (2005–2012), The Village Voice (2016–2017), and The New Yorker magazine (2018–present).

== Comics and other books ==
Stevens' weekly comic "Whatever" appeared in the Boston Phoenix for three years, beginning in spring 2005. A collection of the strips, also called Whatever, was published in April 2008 by Alternative Comics.

In January 2009, Stevens debuted a new weekly comic in the Boston Phoenix called "Failure." Stevens' book The Lodger, published in 2010, is a selection of strips from the first year of "Failure," accompanied by oil paintings and watercolors. In 2010, "Failure" won the Association of Alternative Newsweeklies award for Best Cartoon.

2013 saw the publication of Failure from Alternative Comics which collected the last years of the weekly comic.

In 2018 Retrofit/Big Planet Comics published The Winner, an original graphic novel that focuses on Stevens's relationship with his wife Alex, and various short stories in different genres.

Since 2018 his gag cartoons have been appearing in The New Yorker magazine and website.

2021 saw the publication of Penny: A Graphic Memoir from Chronicle Books. A collection of strips about Stevens's cat, 20 of the strips were originally published in the Village Voice in 2016 and 2017.

2023 saw the publication of the graphic novel Mother Nature from Titan Comics. Adapted from the screenplay written by Jamie Lee Curtis and her writing partner Russell Goldman. Curtis collects Stevens's drawings.

== Painting and other work ==
Stevens' oil paintings and watercolors have been exhibited at the Carroll and Sons in Boston and Room 68 in Provincetown.
