= Johnny Raygun =

Publication information
- Publisher: JetPack Press
- First appearance: Cygnus X2 #2, 1994
- Created by: Rich Woodall

In-story information
- Alter ego: John Kurtzberg
- Team affiliations: Raygun Agency
- Abilities: None

Johnny Raygun is an action/adventure/sci-fi/comedy comic book published by JetPack Press, a small press publisher located in Rochester, New Hampshire. The title refers to the main protagonist, whose name is Johnny and is an agent of the elite "Raygun Agency." The comic's first publication was in 2003, and has largely been a quarterly publication.

The eponymous hero is actually named John Kurtzberg, a nod to famed comic book creator Jack Kirby. In Johnny's fictional universe, "Raygun" is a shortened vernacular term for "Raygun Agent", thus creating the title of the book.

The book pays homage to the style of classic science fiction stories such as Flash Gordon and Buck Rogers, and also Jonny Quest and Silver Age Marvel Comics. The book pokes fun at this subculture, although it does not focus exclusively on parody. There is a serious, serialized sci-fi adventure story running just below the book's jokes and pop culture references.

== Creation and publication history ==
Johnny Raygun the character was created and developed by Rich Woodall, a New Hampshire based illustrator and comic book artist. The character first appeared in Cygnus X2 #2 in 1994, published by Twisted Pearl Press, and later became the star of a short-lived webcomic. However, the series itself didn't take off until Woodall met Matt Talbot, a like-minded individual. Woodall and Talbot began scripting a short story for the character in 2002 that was set to appear in a local comic anthology of short stories. The anthology's publication fell through, and the duo ultimately published the story as an ashcan preview in time for the 2002 Boston, MA Comic Con. Positive attention at the convention spurred an interest in expanding the character, and the Johnny Raygun publication was born, beginning with Johnny Raygun: Special Edition, which reprinted the original ashcan story plus a few backups, and then progressing to quarterly issues featuring full-length stories.

Woodall and Talbot plot and script the book together. Woodall then pencils, and Talbot inks and letters the book. The book has had some noteworthy attention, and has had cover art drawn by comic greats such as Craig Rousseau Erik Larsen, Michael Avon Oeming, and Ed McGuinness.

== Characters ==
=== The Raygun Agency and its allies ===
The Raygun Agency is an intergalactic law enforcement organization, fielding a staff of Agents who come from all walks of life, including planets other than earth. The Agency is a cross between a sci-fi police station and the Green Lantern corps. It is set in a futurized present alternate universe.

- Johnny Raygun: Actually named John Kurtzberg, he is the central character of the series. A relatively new Raygun Agent, Johnny is excitable, ambitious, and occasionally overzealous. He is a capable field agent, but there is nothing to indicate he is special in any way, except for his devotion to his job. He has a penchant for fast food hamburgers, video games, and comic books. A running joke in the series involves other characters poking fun at Johnny's haircut, which was partially inspired by a haircut Woodall himself wore during his high school years. Johnny's exact age is unknown, but it's implied that at this point in the series, Johnny is in his early twenties. He has a younger sister who has electric-based superpowers. Johnny is based in part on Flash Gordon and Spider-Man's alter ego, Peter Parker.
- Amy Oni: A young starlet/socialite in the Raygun universe, she is the daughter of wealthy industrialist Stavros Sartan. It is unclear as to what she is actually famous for, other than being the heiress to a fortune, implying that she is partially a parody of real-life celebrities such as Paris Hilton, Nicky Hilton, and Stavros Niarchos III. Johnny was assigned to Oni as her bodyguard, and the two began a relationship. She is currently Johnny's girlfriend. Amy is tall, slender, and fashionably dressed, with a blonde bob usually held in place with a hairband.

=== Recurring and minor characters ===
- H2Olaf: An aquatic, extraterrestrial agent who wears a glass bubble on his head filled with freshwater (he cannot breathe in salt water or air). H2Olaf has a Type A personality, and his meticulously by-the-book work ethic often conflicts with Johnny's more relaxed and carefree approach to his job. This often leads to humorous and sometimes disastrous situations when the two are paired up for assignments. H2Olaf is a partial spoof of Abe Sapien from the comic book Hellboy.

First appearance: Johnny Raygun One Shot #1.

- Dirk Squarejaw: Dirk is Johnny's direct supervisor, and the head of the Raygun Field Agents. He was also the original Adventure Kid, sidekick to Dr. Oog. Dirk may not agree with all of Johnny's methods, but he still appreciates a job well done. Though he's now primarily behind the desk, Dirk is still known to kick a butt or two if the need arises.

First appearance: Johnny Raygun Quarterly #1

- Kane Grist: One of Johnny's friends in the Agency. Kane is an everyman character who is often teamed up with Johnny and H2Olaf. He has a laid-back demeanor and an unusually high tolerance for Johnny's quirks and tangents, most likely stemming from their friendship in the Raygun Academy. Kane specializes in detective work.

First appearance: Johnny Raygun Special Edition #1

- Iss: One of Johnny's friends in the Agency. Iss is an attractive redhead who gives Johnny dating advice. Their relationship seems to be strictly platonic.
- Mike Rage: A "super-agent" who works for the Raygun Agency on a freelance basis. Mike Rage is everything Johnny is not—handsome, dashing, highly trained, and extremely arrogant. He takes every opportunity to insult Johnny's mom. Mike Rage wears a customized Raygun Agent style uniform.
- Dr. Oog: Once merely a caveman, Dr. Oog was thrust into the 20th century by an unattended time machine. His brain became super-evolved, and he is now the universe's smartest man. Dr. Oog is a super-scientist in the vein of Dr. Benton Quest, Lex Luthor, and most notably Reed Richards of the Fantastic Four. Dr. Oog frequently travels with his wife, Janet, whom he belittles mercilessly, and his son Nathan, an adventurous preteen in the mold of Jonny Quest. Dr. Oog has a tremendous chip on his shoulder and is always depicted as irritated by everything. His constant belittling of his wife, Janet, is a spoof on the way Reed Richards was written in the Silver Age when interacting with his wife, the Invisible Woman.

First appearance: Johnny Raygun Quarterly #1

=== Villains ===
- The Salamander: Real name, Sal Salinsky. The Salamander's origin is an amalgamation of many popular comic book characters' origin stories. This is a spoof of characters with complicated origins in and of itself.
- Mr. Hypothermia: The son of Russian scientists, he was involved in an atomic lab accident that left him with the ability to create and control ice and snow. He was then raised by siberian wolves.

First appearance: Johnny Raygun Classics #1

- Darkmind: A hulking behemoth who can steal other characters' superpowers. He is always accompanied by a diminutive sidekick character named Ralph who rides on his back. Ralph seems to be partly inspired by Salacious Crumb.
- Tiki Monkey: Born a normal ape, Tiki Monkey was captured by tourists, dressed in a Hawaiian shirt, and forced to entertain guests at a karaoke bar. He broke free and ran to the nearby jungle, stumbled upon a tiki mask, and was granted powers from the tiki gods. Tiki Monkey now has an oath to destroy tourism and karaoke bars, wherever they may be. He is a partial spoof of The Mask.

First appearance: Johnny Raygun Classics #1

- The Mighty Moog: The Moog race is a group of sentient, lava-like organisms, originally from Venus. The organism that went by the name The Mighty Moog was captured on Venus, taken to Earth, and put on display in a circus sideshow.

First appearance: Johnny Raygun Quarterly #1

- Johnny Anomalous: Johnny's evil twin from a parallel universe, Johnny Anomalous is a dimension-hopping fiend who travels through Anomalous Holes (a fictional type of wormhole), assassinating his parallel selves. He also goes by the nickname "Johnny A-Hole."
- The Electrolucha: There are two villains named The Electrolucha. One is obese, one is very thin, and both are caucasian. However, both have electric superpowers. Due to a mix-up with a Supervillain branding/marketing agency, both characters wound up with the same name and costume. Rather than letting this deter their fiendish ideas, however, they instead decided to team up and work together for a common cause.

First appearance: Johnny Raygun Quarterly #4
