= Xeric Foundation =

Non-profit environmental and comic book self-publishing grant organization

- Formation: 1992
- Founder: Peter Laird
- Type: 501(c)(3) Non-profit
- Purpose: Comic book self-publishing grants; fostering environmentalism, literacy, and the arts
- Headquarters: Northampton, Massachusetts
- Region served: North America
- Leader: Peter Laird

The Xeric Foundation is a private, non-profit corporation based in Northampton, Massachusetts, which for twenty years awarded self-publishing grants to comic book creators, as well as qualified charitable and nonprofit organizations. The Xeric Foundation was established by Peter Laird, co-creator of the Teenage Mutant Ninja Turtles.

== Mission and operation ==
Laird founded the Foundation as "an appropriate way to give back something extra to the comics world," by providing grants for self-publishers. Laird stated that the Xeric Foundation is "actually two foundations in one. One half of it is for charitable organizations, and the other half is for creators who want to self-publish their comics." The latter half is what the foundation is best known for.

=== Self-publishing grants ===
The Xeric Foundation supported work of an alternative or non-"mainstream" nature, reasoning that if a comic had strong commercial appeal, it would be picked up by one of the major publishers. The Foundation was a valuable supporter of "art for art's sake" comics, and helped launch the careers of a number of "literary" cartoonists.

The Foundation assisted comic book creators with some of the costs in self-publishing their work; it was not the Foundation's intention to fully support an artist/writer through the entire process of self-publishing, but rather to encourage creators to experience the learning process involved in working towards such a goal.

The creative side of the Foundation involved the usual application process and in addition, the Foundation began with "an advisory committee made up of three ... people working in the industry" whose input was sought on how best to proceed with each application. Submissions were evaluated prior to Laird's involvement, and then he made the ultimate decisions based on their recommendations.

== History ==
Laird founded the Xeric Foundation in 1992, the name "originat[ing] out of a Scrabble game with [Laird's] brother Don," "Xeric" simply being "a word [he] like[d]," literally meaning "dry and desertlike" but which "has absolutely no direct connection with the foundation."

The Foundation's first grant cycle was in September 1992, with the first recipients being Robert Eaton, Michael Kasper, Jeff Nicholson, and Wayne Wise & Fred Wheaton.

In 1993 Laird discussed the Foundation's projected lifespan:

... knock on wood, God willing, and the creek don't rise, if we go on for another couple of decades, and I'm able to put more money into the basic funding of the Xeric Foundation, then the amount of money that can be given out can really be raised significantly.

He hoped that ultimately the figure can be raised from "thousands of dollars" to "hundreds of thousands of dollars," to support an increasing number of large and small projects.

In July 2011, the Foundation announced it would no longer award publishing grants, but would focus on charitable work like fostering environmentalism, literacy, and the arts. Citing the changing nature of the comics industry, and specifically the ability of cartoonists to publish their work online, founder Laird announced the shift. One round of final grants was awarded in May 2012.

Altogether, the Xeric Foundation has awarded in excess of $2,500,000 since its first grant cycle.

== Xeric Award ==
Notable past winners of the Xeric Grant include Megan Kelso (1993), David Lasky (1993), Jason Lutes (1993), Adrian Tomine (1993), Tom Hart (1994), Jessica Abel (1995), Bebe Williams (1995), James Sturm (1996), Ellen Forney (1997), Jim Ottaviani (1997), Gene Yang (1997), Dawn Brown (1998), Jason Little (1998), David Choe (1999), Nick Bertozzi (1999), Jason Shiga (1999), Farel Dalrymple (2000), Anders Nilsen (2000), Leland Purvis (2000), Daniel Way (2000), Philip Bourassa (2001), Jordan Crane (2001), Brian Ralph (2001), Hans Rickheit (2001), Donna Barr (2002), Derek Kirk Kim (2002), Sonny Liew (2002), Lauren Weinstein (2002), Josh Neufeld (2004), Karl Stevens (2004), Fred Van Lente and Ryan Dunlavey (2004), David Heatley (2005), Jeff Lemire (2005), Jesse Moynihan (2006), and Blaise Larmee (2009).

== See also ==
- List of Xeric grant winners
