= Hanawalt =

Hanawalt is a surname. Notable people with the surname include:

- Barbara Hanawalt (born 1941), American historian and author
- J. D. Hanawalt (1903–1987), American physicist
- Lisa Hanawalt (born 1983), American illustrator and producer
- Philip Hanawalt (born 1931), American biologist

== See also ==
- Hannawald
