= Pizza Island =

American shared cartooning studio space

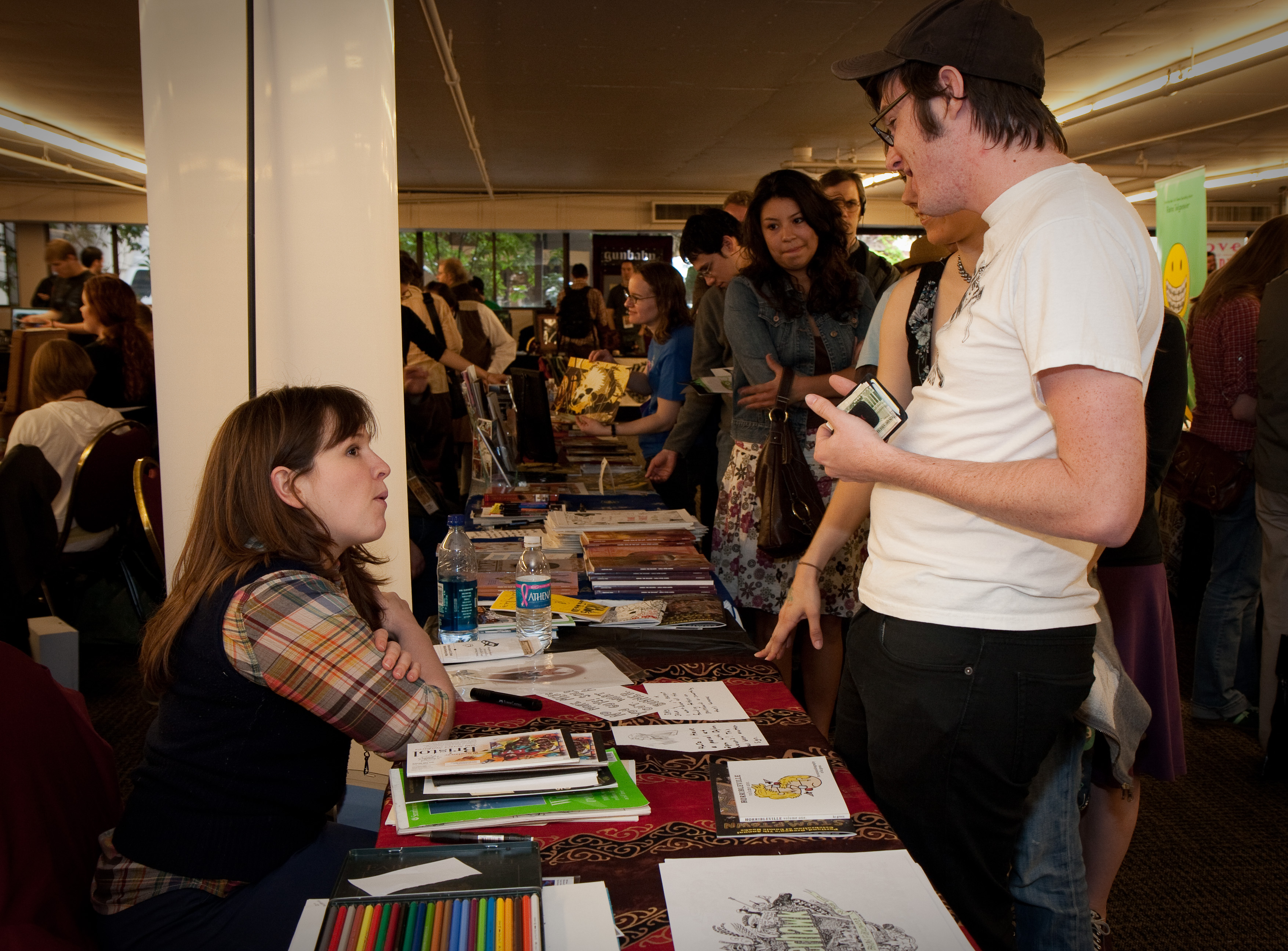
- Kate Beaton – a bestselling cartoonist and former member of Pizza Island – signing books at Stumptown Comics Fest
- Formation: January 2010
- Dissolved: January 17, 2012
- Location(s): Studio 2J in the Morgan Fine Arts and Film Center in Greenpoint, Brooklyn
- Members: Sarah Glidden; Julia Wertz; Domitille Collardey; Kate Beaton; Meredith Gran; Lisa Hanawalt; Karen Sneider; Deana Sobel Lederman

Pizza Island was a shared cartooning studio space in Greenpoint, Brooklyn established in 2010. It was established by Sarah Glidden, Julia Wertz, and Domitille Collardey, and included Kate Beaton, Meredith Gran, Lisa Hanawalt, Karen Sneider, and Deana Sobel Lederman. Unintentionally, it consisted of all-female cartoonists.

== History ==
Sarah Glidden and Julia Wertz had the idea to create a shared cartoon space in October 2009, just as Domitille Collardey was planning to move from her native France to New York. The location of Pizza Island was discovered on Craigslist. According to Glidden, the name comes from a nonexistent restaurant they were mistakenly seeking one night.

Pizza Island was located in Studio 2J at the Morgan Fine Arts and Film Center on 649 Morgan Avenue in Greenpoint, Brooklyn. Their studio was semi-annually open for tours and some Pizza Island members would offer prints and artwork for sale.

== Group ==
- Sarah Glidden, an American cartoonist known for her nonfiction comics and graphic novels.
- Julia Wertz, an American cartoonist, writer, and urban explorer.
- Domitille Collardey, a French cartoonist and comic book designer.
- Kate Beaton, a bestselling Canadian comics artist and the creator of the webcomic strip Hark! A Vagrant.
- Meredith Gran, an American cartoonist and the creator of Octopus Pie who is currently a comics professor at the School of Visual Arts.
- Lisa Hanawalt, an American illustrator and cartoonist, the production designer of BoJack Horseman, and the showrunner of Tuca & Bertie.
- Deana Sobel Lederman, an American illustrator and cartoonist.

Despite its resemblance to a cartoonists collective, Pizza Island cannot be considered an artist collective because there was no shared project or collective rules imposed upon the Pizza Island members. Instead, each was encouraged to pursue her own independent projects, including such different projects as Kate Beaton's comedic webcomic Hark! A Vagrant to Sarah Glidden's 20-page political comic on Iraqi refugees in Syria.

Though the cartoonists worked on separate projects, sharing the space caused them to create lasting connections, such as the friendship of Kate Beaton and Lisa Hanawalt. Being around each other influenced them enough to learn from the others' art styles, comedy, and subject matter. While working, the cartoonists often engaged in conversations and critiques to benefit their comics and illustrations.

== Disbandment ==
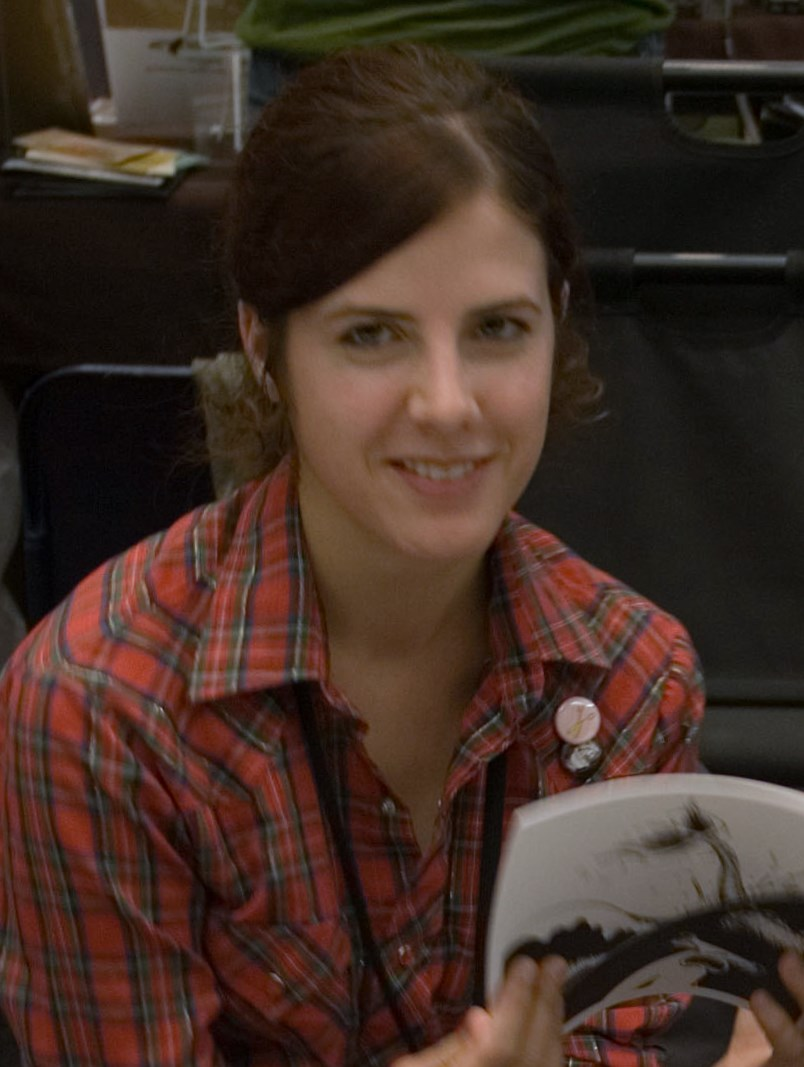
Cartoonist Julia Wertz, the member who wrote Pizza Island's disbandment announcement

Pizza Island announced its disbandment on January 17, 2012 with a satirical blog post written by Wertz, detailing their "cat fights" and "screaming" upon ending this "all-male" studio, as well as lampooning the different cartoonists with exaggerated caricatures of their personality (such as Lisa Hanawalt lovingly drawing a horse as she speaks, having Sarah Glidden run away from the interview with art supplies tumbling out of her clothes, and detailing a failed relationship between Julia Wertz and a parasitic twin growing out of Lisa Hanawalt's back). In reality, the cartoonists parted ways at the end of the lease while retaining their friendships and creative alliances.
