= List of Tuca & Bertie episodes =

Tuca & Bertie is an American animated television series created by cartoonist Lisa Hanawalt. The show is an animated slice-of-life comedy featuring two anthropmorphic bird characters: Tuca Toucan (a toco toucan, voiced by Tiffany Haddish) and Roberta "Bertie" Songthrush (a song thrush, voiced by Ali Wong).

The show was first announced for first-run distribution on Netflix in 2019. The distributor canceled the show after its first season of ten episodes. Due to fan backlash, the program was picked up for a second season by Adult Swim, a programming block of Cartoon Network. The show's second season, also composed of ten episodes, aired between June and August 2021. On November 2, 2022, Hanawalt announced the series was cancelled again after airing two additional seasons.

During the course of the series, 30 episodes of Tuca and Bertie aired over three seasons between both companies.

== Series overview ==
Series overview
Season	Episodes	Originally released		
Season	Episodes	First released	Last released	Network
1	10	May 3, 2019		Netflix
2	10	June 13, 2021	August 15, 2021	Adult Swim
3	10	July 11, 2022	August 29, 2022	Adult Swim

== Episodes ==
=== Season 1 (2019) ===
No. overall	No. in season	Title	Directed by	Written by	Original release date
1	1	"The Sugar Bowl"	Amy Winfrey	Story by : Lisa Hanawalt; Teleplay by : Lisa Hanawalt and Raphael Bob-Waksberg	May 3, 2019
Best friends Tuca and Bertie are former roommates now that Bertie has invited her boyfriend Speckle to live with her. Bertie, anxious about taking their relationship to the next level, fears that any future disagreements between her and Speckle may mean the end of their relationship. Disguising her sadness at living apart from Bertie, Tuca moves to the apartment above Bertie and asks to borrow some sugar. Bertie gives away Speckle's sugar bowl, not realizing it houses his grandmother's ashes. Tuca, having since lost the bowl, helps her locate it. Along the way, the two confront each other about their anxieties. They track the bowl to the bakery of Pastry Pete, an idol to Bertie, who is herself an amateur baker. Tuca pushes Bertie to challenge Pastry Pete to a baking competition in exchange for the bowl. Bertie agrees, but finds herself attracted to Pastry Pete. Upon trying her croissants, Pastry Pete offers Bertie an invitation to be his apprentice. They recover the bowl, but the ashes are accidentally baked into a cake. Bertie apologizes to Speckle, who assures her of his desire to live together. Bertie in turn assures Tuca that she's always welcome to drop in.
2	2	"The Promotion"	Aaron Long	Lisa Hanawalt	May 3, 2019
Bertie is focused on obtaining a promotion at work, but her attempts to establish rapport with her boss and display her ideas at the company meeting are blocked by her chauvinistic coworker Dirk. Later, Dirk sexually harasses Bertie, who is unable to get any support after reporting the incident to Human Resources. Tuca, meanwhile, engages in a series of small jobs to make money, to disastrous results. Upon learning that Bertie was sexually harassed and her chances of securing the promotion stymied, Tuca takes a temp job at the company and helps Bertie showcase her skills. Bertie is discouraged when her boss takes a liking to Tuca's energy and offers her the promotion position instead. Tuca assures her she doesn't want it and helps Bertie call a sexual harassment meeting. Other women in the office corroborate Bertie's experiences with Dirk with their own and Dirk is dismissed. Bertie requests and receives the job promotion, but learns that it means more overtime.
3	3	"The Deli Guy"	Mollie Helms	Lee Sung Jin	May 3, 2019
The normally confident Tuca has a crush on a deli worker, who she calls Deli Guy. After some pushing from Bertie, she asks him out on a date, but her nervousness causes her to act irrationally, alienating her date. She later reveals to Bertie that this was her first date since going sober, and she doesn't know how to react while flirting anymore. Bertie apologizes for pushing her into it. Meanwhile, Bertie has grown bored with her routine sex life with Speckle and attempts to spice things up with sensual dances and pornography. When that doesn't work, they try spanking and role playing, but Bertie has a surprisingly negative reaction to being called a "bad, dirty birdy." The two then watch her favorite British historical romance drama The Nests of Netherfield, and Bertie explains to Speckle that she really just wants to be surprised. Speckle manages to surprise her before work by setting up their apartment like the set of The Nests of Netherfield and romancing her.
4	4	"The Sex Bugs"	James Bowman	Rachelle Williams	May 3, 2019
Tuca has contracted parasites called Sex Bugs, hard-partying, sex-obsessed insects that live in her pubic hair. She convinces Bertie to go out with her to buy some lotion to get rid of them, though Bertie is apprehensive, having called in sick to work to avoid giving a big presentation. Tuca promises it will be a quick trip. Along the way, they encounter a women's empowerment seminar and Bertie takes a flyer. At the store, Tuca disregards the warning labels and mixes the parasite lotions together, causing the Sex Bugs to grow to human size and run amok. Ebony Black, an investigator for the Center for Sex Bug Control, arrives to exterminate them. Tuca objects, stating that the Sex Bugs just want to party and have fun and demands a trial, with Bertie as her counsel. Bertie, whose anxiety has skyrocketed from the trip, initially refuses until Ebony Black's partner Sophie insults Tuca. Bertie capably wins the trial, determining that Tuca contracted them from a bush in a protected historical landmark, which prohibits the killing of the protected Sex Bugs. Realizing she can handle more than she thought, Bertie takes up Pastry Pete's baking apprenticeship and gives her presentation at work.
5	5	"Plumage"	Amy Winfrey	Nick Adams	May 3, 2019
Tuca visits her wealthy Aunt Tallulah for her birthday. Speckle joins so he can see Tallulah's architecturally significant home. Tuca reveals that she grew up poor with her siblings and her single mother, who loved them, but died young. Tuca was taken in by her aunt, who continues to write her checks. The three celebrate by binge drinking, though Speckle notices that Tallulah's comments are highly critical of Tuca. Tuca later reveals to Speckle that she has not told her aunt about her sobriety for fear of bringing down Tallulah's birthday mood. Speckle encourages Tuca to stand up to Tallulah. When Tallulah insults Tuca's mother and mocks Tuca's sobriety, Tuca tears up the check Tallulah wrote for her and leaves. Tallulah yells after Tuca that everyone will leave her. On the drive home, Tuca fears her aunt is right that she will end up alone. Meanwhile, Bertie takes the women's empowerment seminar after encountering a creepy plumber in her building and comes up with a mantra demanding a right to her personal space. While at the bakery, Pastry Pete forcefully presses against Bertie, which causes her to excuse herself to the restroom, where she feverishly masturbates.
6	6	"The Open House"	Aaron Long	Karen Graci	May 3, 2019
Speckle, Bertie, and Tuca spend the day touring open houses to fantasize of home ownership. However, when Speckle and Bertie encounter a home they actually are interested in, they decide to put in an offer. This alarms Tuca, who is worried she will be left behind while they move ahead in their adulthood. She adopts a pet to help her form more commitments and adopts a wild jaguar. Meanwhile, Bertie and Speckle apply for a 30-year mortgage for the house, which alarms Bertie, who begins worrying about a mundane future with Speckle. At the bakery, Bertie's attraction to Pastry Pete grows, causing her to ignore Speckle's voicemails about the house. Bertie puts off his messages until he tells her they missed the opportunity and lost the house. Sensing some concerns, he asks her to call him to talk, but Bertie avoids him and visits Tuca instead. She finds the jaguar attacking Tuca, but Speckle arrives and manages to tame it and find it a home. Bertie apologizes to him and reveals her anxieties about commitment and uncertainty for the future, but Speckle tells her he wants to be with her now and that's all that matters to him.
7	7	"Yeast Week"	Mollie Helms	Gonzalo Cordova	May 3, 2019
While playing a game, Tuca experiences a sharp pain in her side. She refuses to see a doctor, preferring to use homeopathic remedies instead. Bertie prepares for Yeast Week, an elite baking event where she and Pastry Pete will debut a new confection, the crünt. Tuca repeatedly interrupts her with her remedies, which cause Bertie to privately complain to Speckle that Tuca is too needy. Ashamed after overhearing Bertie, Tuca claims she is alright, but collapses in her room. Bertie arrives at Yeast Week and debuts the crünt to great admiration. Tuca wakes up in the hospital, where she learns she has an egg lodged in her Fallopian tube and requires surgery. Tuca reveals that her fear of doctors stems from her childhood when her mother died during surgery following a car accident. Pastry Pete invites Bertie to join him at the top bakers' table, but upon learning that Tuca is in the hospital, she turns down the opportunity. Bertie takes Tuca home, but expresses her resentment that Tuca is careless with herself, resulting in Bertie always needing to take care of her. Thinking they might be growing apart, they decide to take a break from their friendship.
8	8	"The New Bird"	Adam Parton	Lee Sung Jin	May 3, 2019
Dakota arrives to the city and asks Pastry Pete for an apprenticeship, which he agrees to. Bertie is jealous of Dakota, but attempts to bond with her after Speckle suggests being a mentor to her. Bertie and Dakota get along and develop a successful new pastry while Pastry Pete is away. Meanwhile, Tuca is followed around by a mockingly critical apparition of Bertie. She joins a spiritual retreat, but inadvertently turns it into a cult. She flees into the woods and gives in to the apparition, which tells her she will never amount to anything. The apparition then tells Tuca that she is good at many things that Bertie is not, which is why they make a good team. At the bakery, Pastry Pete physically forces Dakota to observe the roux technique just like he did with Bertie; however, Dakota pushes him away and calls him a creep. After Bertie reveals he did the same thing to her, she asks Bertie why she did not warn her and Bertie is unable to respond. Dakota runs away in tears. Bertie leaves the bakery and begins driving. She encounters Tuca on the side of the road and the two drive off together.
9	9	"The Jelly Lakes"	Amy Winfrey	Shauna McGarry	May 3, 2019
After driving in silence all night, Tuca and Bertie tearfully make up with one another. They drive to Jelly Lakes, where Bertie's family owns a cabin. Bertie reveals what happened with Pastry Pete and wonders if he has sexually harassed other women. Speckle calls, concerned about Bertie disappearing, but she continually puts off his calls. They encounter Bertie's former summer camp swimming coach, Coach Maple, and stay at Bertie's cabin for the night. They spend a day at the beach with Maple and her wife Pat. Maple reveals her confusion as to why Bertie suddenly lost interest in swimming, when she trained all summer to swim to Peanut Island. Bertie storms out, arguing that she did not lose interest. Tuca follows and Bertie tearfully reveals a lifeguard had sexually assaulted her. Tuca tells her she is brave and reassures her she is confronting her problems. The next morning, Bertie sets out to swim to Peanut Island, with Tuca, Maple, and Pat following her in a canoe for support. Exhausted, Bertie sinks halfway there, but reconciles with her trauma and emerges, making it to the island. They celebrate and Bertie tells Tuca she is ready to go home.
10	10	"SweetBeak"	Aaron Long	Lisa Hanawalt	May 3, 2019
Tuca and Bertie arrive in town for Molting Season, and Tuca complains about the annual call with her siblings. When Bertie arrives home, Speckle explodes over her sudden disappearance, saying she shuts him out when she's having a problem, and that she needs to be honest and communicative with him. Speckle reveals he bought a teardown home to renovate and says he wants to be with her but won't chase after her anymore. Bertie quits Pastry Pete's and plans to open her own bakery, but finds supplies and space more difficult to secure than she thought. Tuca becomes concerned when her family doesn't call. Bertie reconciles with Speckle, explaining that her trauma made trusting people hard, but she wants to be with him. Later, Tuca and Bertie realize that Pastry Pete has blacklisted them. They confront him and Pastry Pete physically threatens Bertie, but Tuca records it and posts it online. Women boycott Pastry Pete and order from Sweet Beak. Bertie and Tuca fill the orders and distribute them to the public. Tuca calls her sister and says she loves her.

=== Season 2 (2021) ===
No. overall	No. in season	Title	Directed by	Written by	Original release date	U.S. viewers (millions)
11	1	"Bird Mechanics"	Aaron Long	Shauna McGarry	June 13, 2021	0.412
Tuca wants to enhance her dating life by putting several prospective dates in a competition held on a bus, and ends up dating a bird who is a mechanic. Meanwhile, Bertie sees several therapists in an attempt to find a new one who will help her with the anxiety that she feels over her and Speckle's anniversary dinner.
12	2	"Planteau"	Meg Waldow	Lisa Hanawalt	June 20, 2021	0.484
Speckle's sister Dottie is getting married and invites Tuca and Bertie to a bachelorette party weekend in Planteau. Tuca, knowing how much Bertie wants to impress Dottie, agrees to be her social lubricant. Bertie offers to stay sober for the weekend in support of Tuca, but will her social anxiety get in the way of that? Meanwhile, Speckle is also going to Planteau for Dottie's husband-to-be's bachelor party.
13	3	"Kyle"	Adam Parton	Gonzalo Cordova	June 27, 2021	0.493
Bertie has secretly been selling her pastries to her coworkers, being rivaled by Pastry Pete (who hasn't been cancelled). In order for her to stop worrying about Pete and get in touch with the male market, Bertie's therapist recommends she create an idealized version of herself in her head to turn to for guidance when she's stressed or anxious. Instead of imagining herself in a power suit, as most people do, Bertie manifests the ultimate "bro" version of herself named Kyle. With Kyle, she is able to make a pastry that excels in the male market. However, it all goes horribly, and Tuca, finding a job as a crossing guard, helps her put out the fire literally. Soon, Bertie reveals to her boss what she's been doing. However, her boss is all for it, and allows Bertie to make birthday cakes for her coworkers.
14	4	"Nighttime Friend"	Meg Waldow	Shauna McGarry	July 4, 2021	0.399
Tuca can't sleep, so she decides to venture across the city after hours, including going to her favorite diner at night, supplying her Aunt Tallulah with the cheapest booze she can find, gaining the Power of Attorney, meeting a child who also can't sleep, and visiting her mother's grave. At the hospital, Tuca meets a potential new love interest, the night shift nurse Kara. They soon hit it off as Kara takes Tuca to her home, a lighthouse. Kara sings a lullaby, allowing Tuca to finally go to sleep. Meanwhile, Bertie just wants to stay awake long enough to watch an episode of the latest prestige television show, Buried in Oil. Her attempts to stay awake fail as coffee triggers a bout of IBS. It's only when she power naps first that Bertie can stay up and watch the episode with Speckle and Tuca, only to realize the show is actually terrible.
15	5	"Vibe Check"	Peter Merryman	Samantha Irby	July 11, 2021	0.444
Bertie has been having intrusive sexual fantasies while using her vibrator. First, she blames the sex toy for having dreams about Pastry Pete and then she blames the mattress. Bertie soon tells Speckle, who is understanding about what Bertie has been feeling and even shares his own secret fantasy. Meanwhile, Tuca has been crushing hard on Kara ever since she first met her. Without any means of contacting Kara, Tuca goes to the hospital and learns Kara is at a co-worker's birthday party nearby in a bar. Tuca visits the bar and sees Kara texting with another woman. Then she chats with the bartender, who tells Tuca a similar story. She also had a text thread with Kara before Kara inexplicably ghosted her one day. When Tuca calls it a night, Kara chases after her, the two have a sudden hot makeout session.
16	6	"The Moss"	Erica Perez	Gonzalo Cordova	July 18, 2021	0.365
Tuca and Bertie wake to find their apartments covered in moss and a rent increase. The new property manager informs residents that the owner is the unfeeling, unspeaking moss. At an apartment meeting, Tuca promises the irked residents to take the issue to the Mayors: her argumentative brother and sister. The Mayors tell her if a famous person did something in the building the rent is fixed and can't be raised. Back at the apartment, Dapper Dog informs them that famous horror writer Patricia Ramsey used to live in the building. They go to the cactus teens to perform a seance where they discover Patricia's first novel written on the walls of Tuca's apartment. Tuca's apartment is exempt from the rent increase, but not the rest of the building. Meanwhile, Speckle, feeling constrained by client demands, is excited to go "Full Speckle" to create his dream house. Bertie encourages Speckle to go nuts on their house renovation and do what he wants for once. The unfettered Speckle becomes indecisive and decides to just do one of everything. Speckle realizes he needs constraints and a design direction so he goes to Bertie to select the doorknob.
17	7	"Sleepovers"	Samantha S. Gray	Lisa Hanawalt and Shauna McGarry	July 25, 2021	0.390
Bertie goes to Tuca's apartment for a fun roomie hang while Speckle is out of town, but ends up spending the whole time alone. Tuca has a date with Kara that evolves into a multi-day sleepover of constant hangouts and activities. Bertie reminisces of early memories with Tuca and why they were friends. She struggles with being alone for so long and tries to keep herself entertained, but runs out of things to keep her occupied. She keeps messaging Tuca with no response. Meanwhile, Speckle is traversing the snow-covered Knock-Knock in search of the doorknob Bertie selected for their house. A polar bear gets the last doorknob but Speckle is determined to get it anyway.
18	8	"Corpse Week"	Meg Waldow	Samantha Irby	August 1, 2021	0.391
Tuca, Bertie, and Speckle go to see their families for Corpse Week. Tuca and her sister Terry fall into familiar roles and end up screaming at each other. Tuca takes her niece Tulip "Yum or Yell"ing but doesn't realize Tulip is allergic to beets leading to a bad reaction.The next day they all go to Bertie's parents house where they learn her father had open chest surgery and her mother is a hoarder. Despite being raised in a family that holds things in, Bertie shares her childhood trauma and how no one talking about it was the worst part. Meanwhile, Speckle's luggage was switched with a cowboy and at the end they go to switch luggage and ride horses at the "Dude Ranch".
19	9	"The Dance"	Peter Merryman	Shauna McGarry and Chikodili Agwuna	August 8, 2021	0.385
Bertie is staying at Tuca's apartment while Speckle completes renovations on their new house, but is worried because she hasn't seen Tuca in 3 weeks. Bertie's therapist encourages her to reach out to Tuca and invite her to the annual carnival. Tuca accepts and shows up early in a new outfit chosen by her new girlfriend Kara. Bertie is suspicious of the new Tuca. Kara unexpectedly shows up and Bertie tries talking to her to no avail. Bertie takes Tuca to the photobooth and expresses her concern that Kara is controlling and not meeting Tuca where she is and demanding Tuca to make all the changes. In a dreamlike dance sequence Tuca and Kara dance but Kara is impatient of Tuca's dancing and belittles her until she is small enough for Kara to swallow Tuca whole. Then Tuca and Bertie dance and are in perfect rhythm, complimenting each other's dance styles. Kara leaves the carnival and Tuca is upset at Bertie for insinuating that she isn't happy. Post-credits scene: Speckle goes into the soundproof bathroom after eating dozens of hotdogs. He emerges a few moments later after complete silence and struggles out.
20	10	"The Flood"	Mollie Helms	Lisa Hanawalt	August 15, 2021	0.336
Timbourine and Tamarind, the mayors of Birdtown, fail to repair the damaged levees as a result of political interference from the moss. Due to a severe rainstorm in the city, they burst. This causes the city to begin to flood as the city's more wealthy inhabitants flee, the flood being worsened as the drainage system became clogged with the moss. Bertie, in therapy, struggles to find the benefits of her multiple sessions together with Doctor Joanne. As the flood worsened, the two decide to head home, Bertie heads to Tuca's home, who is still waiting for Kara to return her call. The two prepare to head out, but Tuca is reluctant to leave, concerned if Kara would return and not be able to find her in the storm. As Bertie gathers Tuca's belongings, it inadvertently unleashes Tuca's repressed emotions, who manifest themselves in the form of ghosts which circle around her head. The two are forced to leave Tuca's apartment, Bertie decides to head to her and Speckle's house, which was on dry land. The two begin to unpack Tuca's repressed emotions, including Tuca's troubled relationship with her late mother and past with alcoholism. Before Bertie could unpack Tuca's last emotion, the two spot Kara's lighthouse home. Tuca jumps off their makeshift raft and swim towards the lighthouse, meeting its keeper. Desperate to find where Kara is, Tuca desperately asks the keeper, who points her to a cruise ship where Kara and her coworkers are lounging. Tuca confronts Kara, who wordlessly shrugs to her, ending their relationship. Feeling dejected, Bertie and Tuca confront the issues regarding their relationship, they head to Speckle, who wound up stranded as the flood reached their home. A narrator (Whoopi Goldberg) explains that the flood washed away the moss from the city of Birdtown. Speckle, Tuca, and Bertie return to Tuca's apartment, which remained free of the flood. The two look into the setting sun as rescue helicopters pick up stranded residents. Post-credits scene: Dr. Joanne counsels the couple consisting of one of Tuca's Sex Bus rejects and the bird whose car Tuca threw the former into.

=== Season 3 (2022) ===
No. overall	No. in season	Title	Directed by	Written by	Original release date	U.S. viewers (millions)
21	1	"Leveling Up"	Mollie Helms	Gonzalo Cordova	July 11, 2022	0.146
22	2	"The Pain Garden"	Peter Merryman	Lisa Hanawalt	July 11, 2022	0.118
23	3	"The One Where Bertie Gets Eaten by a Snake"	Aaron Long	Raphael Bob-Waksberg	July 18, 2022	0.150
24	4	"Leaf Raking"	Samantha S. Gray	Anne Lane	July 25, 2022	0.210
25	5	"Salad Days"	Mollie Helms; Erica Perez	Huong Nguyen	August 1, 2022	0.182
26	6	"Screech Leeches"	Peter Merryman	Samantha Irby	August 8, 2022	0.198
27	7	"A Very Speckle Episode"	Aaron Long	Gonzalo Cordova	August 15, 2022	0.227
28	8	"Fledging Day"	Samantha S. Gray	Chikodili Agwuna	August 22, 2022	0.212
Bertie spends a tense Fledgling Day with her mother, Anna. They try to bond first at a restaurant and then at a spa. At the spa, Anna tells Bertie that an old flame named Alfred reconnected with her. She admits that she wants to meet him, but just to see him again, and so Bertie agrees to be her wingperson at the meeting. Alfred sees Anna at another restaurant, but he then desperately pleads that he's dying and his last wish is to have anal intercourse with Anna. The bewildered Anna and Bertie stop the meeting by performing the Fledgling Day ritual of the offspring regurgitating food into the mother. In the meantime, Tuca has to deal with cramps until she can renew her prescription. She spends her time coaching Speckle on how to behave as an unemployed person, encouraging him to spend on hobbies and then not take them up. But Speckle winds up gaining expertise on the hobbies he takes up. An annoyed Tuca admits to Speckle that her attitude about work stems from her mother working nonstop but then dying prematurely, making her work not seeming to matter. Later when she picks up her new prescription, Tuca runs into Figgy, and now insists that it does matter that Figgy cure his alcoholism. Post-credits scene: Alfred vigorously licks two ice cream scoops put right next to each other, but concludes that it's "just not the same".
29	9	"Somebirdy's Getting Married"	Erica Perez	Shauna McGarry	August 29, 2022	0.205
Tuca and Bertie attend the wedding of Speckle's sister, Dottie, with Gordon. Bertie is accompanied with a drunk and depressed Speckle, while Tuca is accompanied with Figgy. Tuca explains that she and Figgy are just friends now and that she's watching over Figgy to keep him on the wagon, but Tuca clearly still wants Figgy while Figgy struggles to avoid drinking. Bertie discovers that Speckle's former girlfriends have formed their own club, and becomes so desperate for information on how to help Speckle that she pretends to break up with Speckle to join the club. The club members tell Bertie their reasons for breaking up with Speckle; one of them, Partrigina, even left him for one of his buildings, and she went on to give birth to bricks. They also tell her that the breakups were the best things to happen to Speckle, as he always reacted by putting his life back together. This news shocks Bertie. Meanwhile, Tuca runs into Kara. Kara's new girlfriend tells Tuca that after their breakup, Kara realized all on her own that she had control issues and decided to get therapy for them. Tuca realizes that she can't force a person to change like she's tried with Figgy, and breaks down in tears over just being friends with him. Later, Patrigina comes on to Speckle, having broken up with the building. This causes Bertie to admit that she lied about breaking up with Speckle and to commit to staying with him. Speckle explains that it wasn't the breakups that made him put his life back together. Outside, Tuca and Figgy admit to still wanting each other, and they have sex on the stairway. But right after, Tuca has a severe onset of cramps. Kara examines her, and determines that Tuca has to be rushed to the hospital. Bertie rides with Tuca on the ambulance while Figgy drives Speckle home. Dottie discovers that Gordon had been hiding during the whole reception because he ripped off the caterers to pay for the venue. Dottie confesses that she ripped off the venue to pay for the caterers, and the two go on the lam together. Post-credits scene: Partrigina's brick children dance at the reception.
30	10	"The Mole"	Peter Merryman	Lisa Hanawalt	August 29, 2022	0.205
