= Julia Wertz =

American cartoonist

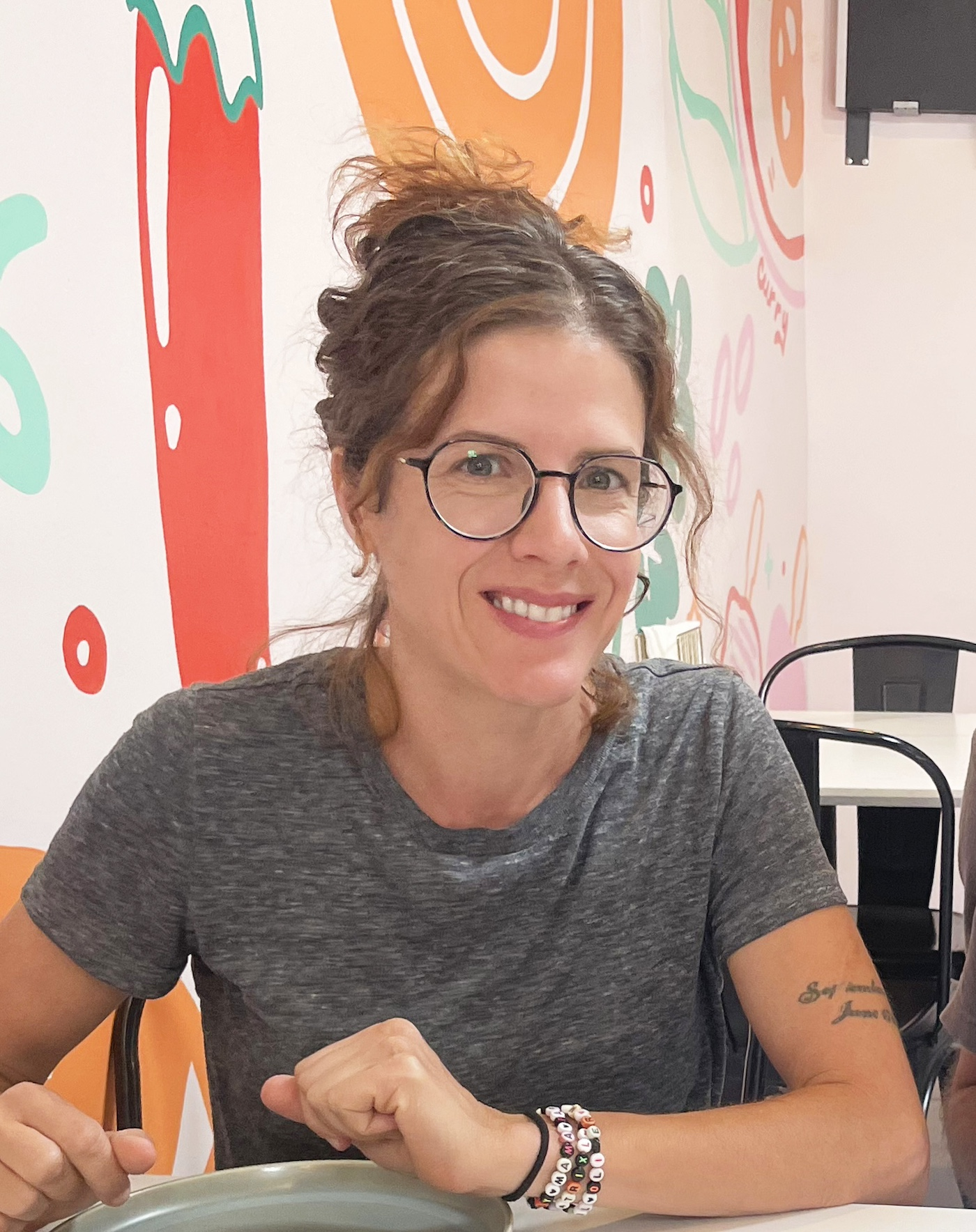
- Julia Wertz in Oakland in 2025
- Born: Julia Wertz; December 29, 1982 (age 43) Napa, CA
- Areas: Cartoonist, Writer
- Notable works: Bury Me Already (It's Nice Down Here) Impossible People Tenements, Towers & Trash Fart Party

Julia Wertz (born December 29, 1982) is an American cartoonist, writer and urban explorer.

== Cartooning career ==
Wertz was born in the San Francisco Bay Area. She is known for her comedic graphic novel memoirs that, despite being lauded for their humor, address serious subject matters like alcoholism, mental illness, abortion, miscarriage, and a variety of personal and societal failures. She also writes and draws extensively about history and urban exploring, both in book form and in publications like the New Yorker.

She first made her name with a comic strip titled The Fart Party, which chronicled her life in San Francisco in comic strip form. The strip quickly gained popularity, garnering praise for its "crude but sharp humor and wit" from publications like the Onion and New York Magazine. Atomic Books anthologized in two volumes in 2007 and 2009. Soon after the strip's success, Wertz retired the nameThe Fart Party, claiming she was unaware of its impending significance at the time of its creation. Despite dropping the name, she has stated many times she still thinks it's funny.

In 2010, Random House published Drinking at the Movies, Wertz's first full-length graphic memoir. Against the backdrop of her move from San Francisco to New York, the book depicts a family member's battle with substance abuse and her own alcoholism, with her trademark humor and self-depreciation. The Los Angeles Times called Drinking at the Movies a "quiet triumph" and critic Rob Clough, in The Comics Journal, said Wertz had "brilliant old-school comic strip timing." Drinking at the Movies was nominated for a 2011 Eisner Award in the Best Humor Publication category.

In September 2012, Koyama Press published The Infinite Wait and Other Stories, a collection of short comic stories: Industry, about all Wertz's service industry jobs, The Infinite Wait, about getting a chronic illness diagnosis, and A Strange and Curious Place, about the role public libraries played throughout her life. The Infinite Wait was nominated for an Eisner Award in the Best Reality Based Work category. In 2017, Uncivilized Books published Museum of Mistakes: The Fart Party Collection, which anthologized Wertz's early books, plus new and extra material.

From 2010 to 2012, Wertz was part of Pizza Island, a Greenpoint studio consisting of cartoonists Sarah Glidden, Lisa Hanawalt, Domitille Collardey, Karen Sneider, Kate Beaton and Meredith Gran.

In 2015, Wertz started a monthly comics series for The New Yorker, about lesser-known historical events and facts about New York City, which appear online and in print, as well as a monthly illustrations of cityscapes for Harper's Magazine, and the vanishing storefronts series for the New York Times. Those pieces were eventually expanded to make the book Tenements, Towers & Trash: An Unconventional Illustrated History of New York City, published by Black Dog & Leventhal/Hachette in 2017, for which Wertz won the 2018 Brendan Gill Prize. The New York Times called the book "a passionate anatomy of the city," and described Wertz as, "awkward and supremely lovable." Her work for the New Yorker expanded to autobiographical comics and still run once a month.

In 2023, Wertz released Impossible People; A Completely Average Recovery Story (published by Black Dog & Leventhal/Hachette) about her struggle with alcoholism and sobriety, and her path to becoming a professional cartoonist and being forced to leave NYC and return to California. Kirkus called the book "extraordinary" and NPR claimed it was "unusually absorbing." The follow-up, Bury Me Already (It's Nice Down Here): Comics on Pregnancy and Parenthood, came out in 2026. It detailed her reunion with the boyfriend from her first book, and her experiences of pregnancy and parenthood during the pandemic, California wildfires, and a traumatic family crisis. Publishers Weekly called it "fearless and funny." Her last three books all received starred reviews from Publishers Weekly. She has been a MacDowell residency fellow two times (2016 and 2018), but (as she notes on her website) she was rejected from Yaddo. Her books have been translated into many different languages.

After spending a decade in New York City, Wertz moved back to Northern California in 2016 where she lives with her partner Oliver, and their son Felix. She also runs Adventure Bible School, a blog about history and urban exploring.

== Published works ==
- The Fart Party, Vol. 1: A collection of Wertz's first irreverent autobiographical comic strips about living and working in San Francisco in her early twenties. Atomic Books, 2007 (ISBN 978-0-9786569-3-5)
- The Fart Party, Vol. 2: A second collection of Fart Party strips about leaving the city and cross country travel. Atomic Books, 2009 (ISBN 978-0-9786569-4-2)
- Drinking at the Movies: Wertz's first graphic novel, told in strip form, about her first years of living in New York City. Random House, 2010 (ISBN 978-0-307-59183-8)
- The Infinite Wait & Other Stories: A collection of three short stories. Industry (about all Wertz's service industry jobs) The Infinite Wait (about getting a chronic illness diagnosis) and A Strange and Curious Place (about public libraries). Koyama Press, 2012 (ISBN 978-0-9879630-2-4)
- Museum of Mistakes: The Fart Party Collection: 2/3 omnibus of the two first Fart Party Books 1/3 previously unpublished early work. Uncivilized Press, 2023 (ISBN 978-1941250464)
- Tenements, Towers & Trash: An Unconventional Illustrated History of New York City. A collection of stories and art about NYC's lesser known history, abandoned places, and changing streetscapes. Black Dog & Leventhal, 2017 (ISBN 978-0316501217)
- Impossible People: A Completely Average Recovery Story: A graphic novel memoir about Wertz's struggle with alcoholism and sobriety, and her path to becoming a professional cartoonist and leaving NYC. Black Dog & Leventhal, 2023 (ISBN 978-0-7624-6825-6)
- Bury Me Already (It's Nice Down Here): Comics on Pregnancy and Parenthood: A graphic novel memoir about pregnancy and parenthood during the pandemic, California Wildfires, and a family crisis. Black Dog & Leventhal, 2026 (ISBN 978-0762468263)
