= Sarah Glidden =

American cartoonist (born 1980)

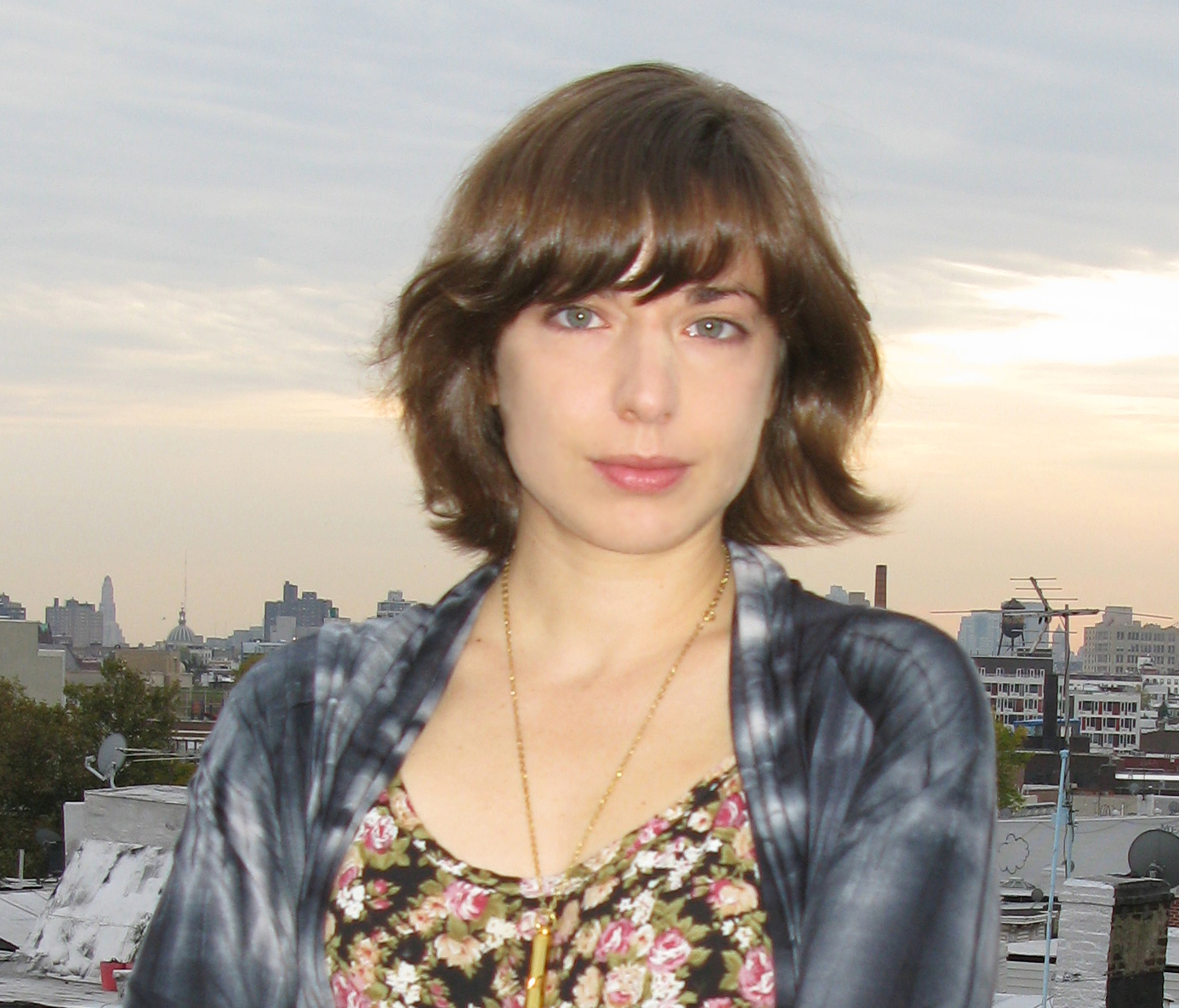
- Glidden in 2010
- Born: 1980 (age 45–46) Massachusetts, U.S.
- Area: Cartoonist
- Notable works: How to Understand Israel in 60 Days or Less; Rolling Blackouts
- Awards: Ignatz Award (2008); Lynd Ward Graphic Novel Prize (2017)

Sarah Glidden (born in 1980) is an American cartoonist known for her nonfiction comics and graphic novels.

== Biography ==
Glidden was born in Massachusetts, to a family of Jewish background. Glidden studied painting at Boston University. She began making comics in 2006 when she was living at the Flux Factory artist collective in Queens, New York. She visited Israel as part of a Birthright Israel tour in 2007. The self-published minicomics she made about that experience won her a 2008 Ignatz Award for "Promising New Talent". In 2010, Glidden wrote and illustrated the graphic novel How to Understand Israel in 60 Days or Less, a full-length exploration of her 2007 trip. The book has subsequently been translated into five languages.

From 2010 to 2012, Glidden was part of Pizza Island, a studio consisting of cartoonists Julia Wertz, Lisa Hanawalt, Domitille Collardey, Karen Sneider, Kate Beaton and Meredith Gran.

Since the publication of How to Understand Israel in 60 Days or Less, Glidden has been working in comics journalism. Her 20-page comic on Iraqi refugees in Syria was published on the website Cartoon Movement in 2011, and she also did work for the comics journalism publication Symbolia.

Glidden spent a year in Angoulême, France, as an artist in residence at the Maison des Auteurs.

In October 2016, Drawn & Quarterly published Glidden's Rolling Blackouts, the nonfiction story of her travels in 2010 through Turkey, Syria, and Iraq with a small team of journalists. Rolling Blackouts won the 2017 Lynd Ward Prize for Graphic Novel of the Year, sponsored by Penn State University Libraries and administered by the Pennsylvania Center for the Book.

Glidden lives in Seattle, Washington.

== Bibliography ==
- Rolling Blackouts: Dispatches from Turkey, Syria, and Iraq (Drawn & Quarterly, 2016)
- How to Understand Israel in 60 Days or Less (Drawn & Quarterly, 2016; first edition Vertigo/DC Comics, 2010) ISBN 978-1401222345
- Small Noises (self-published, 2006)
