= Pinecone & Pony =

Children's animated television series

- Promotional poster
- Genre: Children’s animation adventure
- Based on: The Princess and the Pony by Kate Beaton
- Developed by: Stephanie Kaliner
- Directed by: Wayne-Michael Lee
- Voices of: Maria Nash; Alicia Richardson; Andy Hull; Rachel House; Thom Allison; Chase W. Dillon; Viola Abley
- Theme music composer: Greg Alsop
- Opening theme: "Warrior"
- Composers: Caleb Chan; Brian Chan
- Countries of origin: United States; Canada
- Original language: English
- No. of seasons: 2
- No. of episodes: 16 (31 segments)

Production
- Executive producers: Stephanie Kaliner; Christina Piovesan; Kate Beaton; Mackenzie Lush
- Editor: Taneka Stotts
- Production companies: Atomic Cartoons; First Generation Films; DreamWorks Animation Television

Original release
- Network: Apple TV+
- Release: April 8, 2022 – February 3, 2023

Pinecone & Pony is a children's animated television series produced by DreamWorks Animation and First Generation Films for Apple TV+. The series is loosely based on the children's book The Princess and the Pony by Kate Beaton. The first season was released on April 8, 2022, and the second season was released on February 3, 2023.

== Premise ==
The series follows the adventures of Pinecone and her pony as they face trolls, giants, dragons and a dangerous rope bridge atop a valley.

== Cast and characters ==
- Maria Nash as Pinecone
- Chase W. Dillon as Hawthorn
- Rachel House as Gladys
- Alicia Richardson as Queen Kimya
- Andy Hull as Arlo/Whomp
- Thom Allison as Greymoon
- Viola Abley as Annabelle
- Vienna Jackson as Oatcake
- River Novin as Peregrine
- Shiloh Obasi as Rhino
- Beatrice Schneider as Fauna
- Ser Anzoategui as Wren
- Emma Hunter as Magpie
- Scott Thompson as Thistle
- Karen Robinson as Magnolia
- Michela Mohamud as Beetle
- Jonathan Langdon as Rowan
- Grace Lynn Kung as June
- Julius Cho as Doraji
- Samiyah Crowfoot as Celestia
- John Michael Banovich as Nova

== Episodes ==
=== Series overview ===
| Season | Segments | Episodes | Originally released |
|---|---|---|---|
| 1 | 16 | 8 | April 8, 2022 |
| 2 | 15 | 8 | February 3, 2023 |

=== Season 1 (2022) ===
| No. overall | No. in season | Title | Written by | Original release date |
|---|---|---|---|---|
| 1 | 1 | "The Pwettiest Pony" | Stephanie Kaliner | April 8, 2022 |
| 1 | 1 | "Try This Club on for Size" | Lakna Edilima | April 8, 2022 |
| 2 | 2 | "Lance or Not" | Jocelyn Geddie | April 8, 2022 |
| 2 | 2 | "Treat Your Creature" | Evany Rosen | April 8, 2022 |
| 3 | 3 | "O Prickly, Where Art Thou?" | Jocelyn Geddie | April 8, 2022 |
| 3 | 3 | "Big Trouble in Lil Labyrinth" | Taneka Stotts | April 8, 2022 |
| 4 | 4 | "This Calls for Courage" | Taneka Scotts | April 8, 2022 |
| 4 | 4 | "The Straight and Arrow" | Stephanie Kaliner | April 8, 2022 |
| 5 | 5 | "It's a Pony Thing" | Lienne Sawatsky | April 8, 2022 |
| 5 | 5 | "Hawthorn the Adventurer" | Pilot Viruet | April 8, 2022 |
| 6 | 6 | "In Plain Sight" | Pilot Viruet | April 8, 2022 |
| 6 | 6 | "Belt or Bust" | Lakna Edilima | April 8, 2022 |
| 7 | 7 | "You're On!" | Kate Beaton | April 8, 2022 |
| 7 | 7 | "The Pony Express" | Jocelyn Geddie | April 8, 2022 |
| 8 | 8 | "What Would Freda Do?" | Evany Rosen | April 8, 2022 |
| 8 | 8 | "A Token of Toughness" | Gigi D.G. | April 8, 2022 |

=== Season 2 (2023) ===
| No. overall | No. in season | Title | Written by | Original release date |
|---|---|---|---|---|
| 9 | 1 | "Hero Soup" | Lienne Sawatsky | February 3, 2023 |
| 9 | 1 | "Sleepless at the Sleepover" | Kate Beaton | February 3, 2023 |
| 10 | 2 | "The Harvest Spirit" | Lakna Edilima | February 3, 2023 |
| 10 | 2 | "Speak From the Art" | Jocelyn Geddie | February 3, 2023 |
| 11 | 3 | "One Night Only" | Laurie Elliott | February 3, 2023 |
| 11 | 3 | "Fountains of Youths" | Taneka Stotts | February 3, 2023 |
| 12 | 4 | "Good Night, Bad Knight" | Taneka Stotts | February 3, 2023 |
| 12 | 4 | "A Life of Adventure" | Gigi D.G. | February 3, 2023 |
| 13 | 5 | "Pinecone and Horse" | Corey Liu | February 3, 2023 |
| 13 | 5 | "Once in a Violetmoon" | Tally Yong Knoli | February 3, 2023 |
| 14 | 6 | "Festival of Might" | Evany Rosen | February 3, 2023 |
| 14 | 6 | "Sage Advice" | Corey Liu | February 3, 2023 |
| 15 | 7 | "Next in Line" | Tally Yong Knoli | February 3, 2023 |
| 15 | 7 | "A Spell of Your Own" | Tristen Sutherland | February 3, 2023 |
| 16 | 8 | "The Sturdy Stone" | Stephanie Kaliner | February 3, 2023 |

== Production ==
Cartoonist Kate Beaton published the webcomic Hark! A Vagrant from 2008 to 2018 with a variety of characters, one of which was a fat, farting pony. This pony later played a central role in Beaton's 2015 children's book The Princess and the Pony, about a warrior princess named Princess Pinecone who receives a pony as a birthday gift.

Beaton was approached several years later by First Generation Films, a production company out of Toronto, asking for the rights to the show to option it (in partnership with DreamWorks Animation) to different streaming services. The show was eventually picked up by Apple TV+ as the platform began to roll out children's programming.

Beaton is listed on the project as Executive Producer along with Christina Piovesan, Mackenzie Lush and showrunner Stephanie Kaliner. While Beaton worked on the show from her home in Mabou, Nova Scotia, animation was handled by Atomic Cartoons of Ottawa. The cast included Maria Nash as the title character, Alicia Richardson, Andy Hull, Rachel House, Thom Allison, Chase W. Dillon and Viola Abley. Following the release of Season 1, Back Lot Music released a new song called "Warrior" written by Greg Alsop and performed by Tasha Peter.

The show was cancelled in early 2024.

== Accolades ==
| Year | Award | Category | Nominee(s) | Result | Ref. |
|---|---|---|---|---|---|
| 2022 | Canadian Screen Music Awards | Best Original Score for a Children's Program or Series | Caleb Chan and Brian Chan | Nominated | |
| 2023 | GLAAD Media Awards | Outstanding Children's Programming | Pinecone & Pony | Nominated | |
| 2023 | Canadian Screen Awards | Best Directing in an Animated Program or Series | Wayne-Michael Lee for ("What Would Freda Do? / A Token of Toughness") | Nominated | |
| 2023 | Canadian Screen Awards | Best Original Music, Animation | Caleb Chan and Brian Chan for ("Lance Or Not / Treat Your Creature") | Nominated | |
| 2023 | Canadian Screen Awards | Best Writing in an Animated Program or Series | Stephanie Kaliner and Lakna Edirisinghe for ("The Pwettiest Pony / Try This Club On For Size") | Won | |
| 2023 | Leo Awards | Best Musical Score, Animation Series | Caleb Chan and Brian Chan for ("You're On! / The Pony Express") | Nominated | |
| 2023 | Leo Awards | Best Screenwriting, Youth or Children's Program or Series | Corey Liu for ("Pinecone & Horse") | Nominated | |
| 2023 | Humanitas Prize | Children's Teleplay | Gigi D.G for ("A Life of Adventure") | Nominated | |
| 2023 | Canadian Screen Music Awards | Best Original Score for an Animated Series or Special | Caleb Chan and Brian Chan for ("The Sturdy Stone") | Nominated | |
| 2023 | Children's and Family Emmy Awards | Outstanding Younger Voice Performer in an Animated or Preschool Animated Program | Maria Nash | Won | |
| 2024 | GLAAD Media Awards | Outstanding Children's Programming | Pinecone & Pony | Nominated | |
| 2024 | ACTRA Award | Outstanding Performance – Gender Non-Conforming or Female Voice | Emma Hunter for ("Pinecone and Horse") | Nominated | |
| 2024 | ACTRA Award | Outstanding Performance – Gender Non-Conforming or Female Voice | Maria Nash for ("The Sturdy Stone") | Won | |
| 2024 | Canadian Screen Awards | Best Animated Program or Series | Pinecone & Pony | Nominated | |
| 2024 | Canadian Screen Awards | Best Editing in an Animated Program or Series | Joshua Guitar for ("The Sturdy Stone") | Won | |
| 2024 | Canadian Screen Awards | Best Sound in an Animated Program or Series | Mike Mancuso, Joe Tetreau, Evan Turner, Ryan Eligh, Patrick Mallan and Matt McKenzie for ("The Sturdy Stone") | Nominated | |
| 2024 | Canadian Screen Awards | Best Directing in an Animated Program or Series | Wayne-Michael Lee for ("The Sturdy Stone") | Nominated | |
| 2024 | Canadian Screen Awards | Best Original Music, Animation | Caleb Chan and Brian Chan for ("The Sturdy Stone") | Nominated | |
| 2024 | Canadian Screen Awards | Best Writing in an Animated Program or Series | Jocelyn Geddie for ("Speak from the Art") | Nominated | |
| 2024 | Canadian Screen Awards | Best Writing in an Animated Program or Series | Stephanie Kaliner for ("The Sturdy Stone") | Nominated | |
| 2024 | Canadian Screen Awards | Best Writing in an Animated Program or Series | Corey Liu for ("Pinecone and Horse") | Nominated | |
