= Kate Beaton =

Canadian comics artist (born 1983)

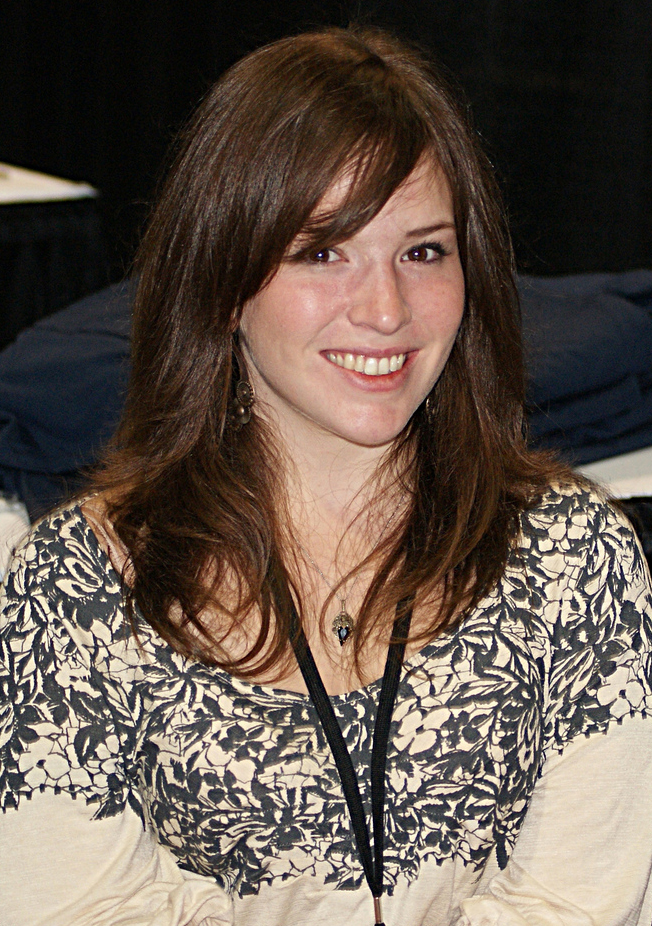
- Beaton at the Calgary Comic and Entertainment Expo in 2011
- Born: 8 September 1983 (age 43) Inverness County, Nova Scotia, Canada
- Notable works: Hark! A Vagrant; Ducks: Two Years in the Oil Sands
- Spouse: Morgan Murray (m. 2018)

Kathryn Moira Beaton (born 8 September 1983) is a Canadian comics artist who created the comic strip Hark! A Vagrant, which ran from 2007 to 2018. Her other works include the children's books The Princess and the Pony (2015) and King Baby (2016), and the memoir Ducks: Two Years in the Oil Sands (2022). Publishers Weekly named Ducks one of their top ten books of the year. In 2022, The Princess and the Pony was adapted into the Apple TV+ series Pinecone & Pony, on which Beaton worked as an executive producer.

== Early life ==
Of Scottish descent, Beaton grew up with her three sisters in Mabou on the isle of Cape Breton. She went to a small school for K–12, only having 23 people in her class. She graduated from Mount Allison University in 2005 with a Bachelor of Arts in history and anthropology. Beaton began drawing comics for the university newspaper, The Argosy, during her third and fourth years at school. After college, she worked as an administrative assistant in the Maritime Museum of British Columbia in Victoria.

== Career ==
After graduating from Mount Allison in 2005 Beaton worked at an oil sands mining project in Fort McMurray to pay off her student loans. In 2007, while still working at the Maritime Museum of BC, Beaton decided to publish some of her history-inspired comics on the Web. She posted comics to a new website, katebeaton.com, and to a LiveJournal blog. In December of that year, she published the first of two popular batches of history-themed comic strips, whose subjects were ones suggested by at least twenty of her readers.

Beaton published her webcomic, Hark! A Vagrant, from 2007 to 2018. She moved her work from LiveJournal to her new website, also titled Hark! A Vagrant, in May 2008. Its subjects included historical figures, such as James Joyce and Ada Lovelace, or fictional characters from Western literature. In several comics, Beaton caricatured herself, past and present. Beaton has a simple artistic style, with particular attention to detail paid to her characters' facial expressions; her skill at comic pacing has also been noted. Hark! A Vagrant won the 2011 Ignatz Award for Outstanding Online Comic.

Beaton's work has been profiled in Wired, Maclean's, and Comic Book Resources. "The Origin of Man", her comic celebrating Charles Darwin's 200th birthday, was showcased by MySpace Dark Horse Presents in March 2009. In June 2009, she released a book titled Never Learn Anything from History. Several of her cartoons have been published in The New Yorker. Drawn & Quarterly released her second book, also titled Hark! A Vagrant, in September 2011. Time magazine named it one of the top ten fiction books of the year, with Lev Grossman calling it "the wittiest book of the year."

Beaton's self-published Never Learn Anything from History won the 2009 Doug Wright Award for Best Emerging Talent. Hark! A Vagrant won the 2011 Harvey Award for Best Online Comics Work, having been nominated the previous year, and was also nominated for Joe Shuster Awards in 2009 and 2010. Beaton followed up her 2011 Harvey win by taking home three Harveys in 2012, for Humor, Online Work, and Best Cartoonist.

She is a former member of Pizza Island, a cartoonist's studio in Greenpoint, Brooklyn which was formed by herself and cartoonists Lisa Hanawalt, Domitille Collardey, Sarah Glidden, Meredith Gran, and Julia Wertz.

Beaton has contributed to Marvel Comics' Strange Tales anthology. In 2014, Beaton uploaded the five-part webcomic Ducks, which presents a more serious and complex story based on Beaton's experiences working at a remote mining site in Canada.

Step Aside, Pops, a collection of her Hark! A Vagrant comics, topped The New York Times graphic novel bestseller list in October 2015. In a 2015 poll, Beaton ranked fourteenth among the top all-time female comics artists.

Beaton's first children's book, The Princess and the Pony, was released in 2015. In 2016, she published the picture book King Baby. In October 2018, Beaton ended the ongoing serialization of her webcomic, saying, "I feel like this is a project that has run its course." In 2022, an animated TV series based on Kate Beaton's The Princess and the Pony, Pinecone & Pony, was released on the streaming service Apple TV+, with Beaton serving as executive producer.

In September 2022, Beaton released a comic memoir, Ducks: Two Years in the Oil Sands, which documented her experience working in the energy extraction industry for Alberta oil sands before she became a cartoonist. It expanded on her earlier 2014 webcomic Ducks. The book won the 2023 edition of Canada Reads, where it was championed by Mattea Roach. The American Library Association listed Ducks among their top ten in the 2022 Best Graphic Novels for Adults list.

== Personal life ==
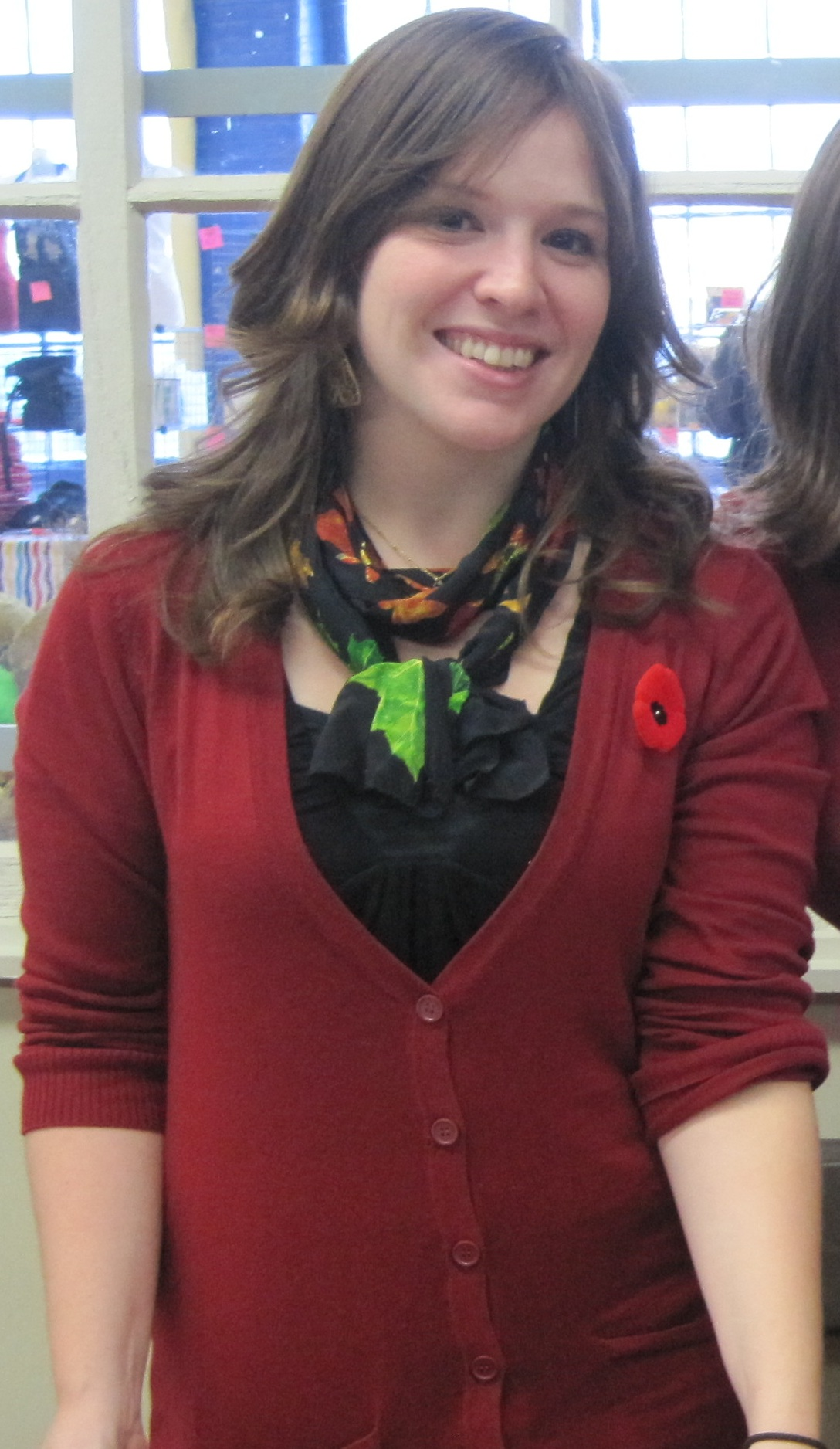
Kate Beaton at NEWW, wearing a Remembrance Poppy

She is married to writer Morgan Murray. She has two children. After living in New York and Toronto, Beaton now lives in Nova Scotia with her family.

== Awards ==
Year	Nominated work	Category	Result	Notes
2009	Hark! A Vagrant	Doug Wright Award for Best Emerging Talent	Won	
2009	Hark! A Vagrant	Kimberly Yale Award for Best New Talent	Won	
2009	Hark! A Vagrant	Joe Shuster Awards	Nominated	
2010	Overall body of work	Lulu of the Year Award	Won	
2010	Hark! A Vagrant	Joe Shuster Awards	Nominated	
2010	Hark! A Vagrant	Harvey Award for Best Online Comics Work	Nominated	
2010	Never Learn Anything From History	Doug Wright Award for The Pigskin Peters Award	Nominated	
2011	Hark! A Vagrant	Ignatz Award for Outstanding Online Comic	Won	
2012	Hark! A Vagrant	Harvey Award for Best Online Comics Work	Won	
2012	Hark! A Vagrant	Harvey Award Special Award for Humor in Comics	Won	
2012	Hark! A Vagrant	Harvey Award for Best Cartoonist	Won	
2012	Hark! A Vagrant	Doug Wright Award for Best Book	Won	
2016	Step Aside, Pops: A Hark! A Vagrant Collection	Eisner Award for Best Humor Publication	Won	
2016	Step Aside, Pops: A Hark! A Vagrant Collection	Doug Wright Award for Best Book	Nominated	
2016	The Princess and The Pony	CBC Children's Choice Book Award: Illustrator	Won	
2016	The Princess and The Pony	E.B. White Read-Aloud Book Award: Picture Book	Nominated	
2016	King Baby	NAPPA Awards	Won	
2023	Ducks: Two Years in the Oil Sands	Eisner Award for Best Graphic Memoir	Won	
2023	Ducks: Two Years in the Oil Sands	Eisner Award for Best Writer/Artist	Won	
2023	Ducks: Two Years in the Oil Sands	Harvey Award for Book of the Year	Won	
2023	Ducks: Two Years in the Oil Sands	Ignatz Award for Outstanding Graphic Novel	Won	

== Bibliography ==
=== Comic collections ===
- Never Learn Anything From History (2009)
- Hark! A Vagrant (Montréal: Drawn & Quarterly, 2011, ISBN 978-1770460607)
- Step Aside, Pops (Montréal: Drawn & Quarterly, 2015, ISBN 978-1770462083)

=== Children's books ===
- The Princess and the Pony (New York, NY: Arthur A. Levine Books, an imprint of Scholastic Inc., 2015, ISBN 978-0545637084)
- King Baby (New York, NY: Arthur A. Levine Books, an imprint of Scholastic Inc., 2016, ISBN 978-0545637541)
- Shark Girl (New York, NY: St. Martin's Press, an imprint of Macmillan Publishers, 2025, ISBN 9781250184924)

=== Fiction ===
- Rebecca (New York: Roaring Book Press, 2026, ISBN 9781250349019)

=== Non-fiction ===
- Ducks: Two Years in the Oil Sands (Montréal: Drawn & Quarterly, 2022, ISBN 978-1770462892)
- Bodies of Art, Bodies of Labour (Edmonton: University of Alberta Press, 2025, ISBN 978-1772128000)
