= Ducks: Two Years in the Oil Sands =

2022 autobiographical comic by Kate Beaton

- Date: 2022
- Page count: 436 pages
- Publisher: Drawn & Quarterly

Creative team
- Creator: Kate Beaton
- ISBN: 9781770462892

Ducks: Two Years in the Oil Sands is an autobiographical comic by Canadian cartoonist Kate Beaton. Published by Drawn & Quarterly in 2022, Ducks is an extension of a five-part webcomic Beaton initially posted to Tumblr in 2014. It is an account of her experience as a woman from Atlantic Canada working in the Athabasca oil sands in Alberta to pay off her student loans. The book is named after a disaster in which hundreds of ducks died after landing in a toxic tailings pond.

== Summary ==
Ducks is a memoir of Beaton's experiences working in the oil fields in Alberta starting in 2005. Raised in Mabou, Nova Scotia, and fresh out of Mount Allison University in New Brunswick, she needs to work in order to pay off her student debt. Like many in Atlantic Canada, she chooses to seek work elsewhere; whereas previous generations would travel to work in fisheries, coal mines, or auto manufacturing plants, the mid-2000s oil boom led many Easterners to work in the oil industry. She initially works in a tool crib at Mildred Lake for Syncrude but also works at Long Lake and in various other camps taking on different roles. She meets other migrant workers, many interprovincial migrants from Eastern Canada.

Though Beaton empathizes with many of the workers and their economic plight, the labour force is overwhelmingly male, and she is subjected to sexual harassment and raped and finds little sympathy. Fed up with her experience, she leaves to work in Victoria, British Columbia, where she begins cartooning and creates Hark! A Vagrant. Faced with low job security and unable to pay off her loans, she returns to the oil fields. She grapples with the morality of the oil industry, reflecting on harassment and sexual violence, environmental degradation, homesickness, loneliness, the health risks to workers and locals, and the destruction of the lands of the First Nations. After earning enough to pay off her loans, she leaves Alberta.

== Reception and themes ==
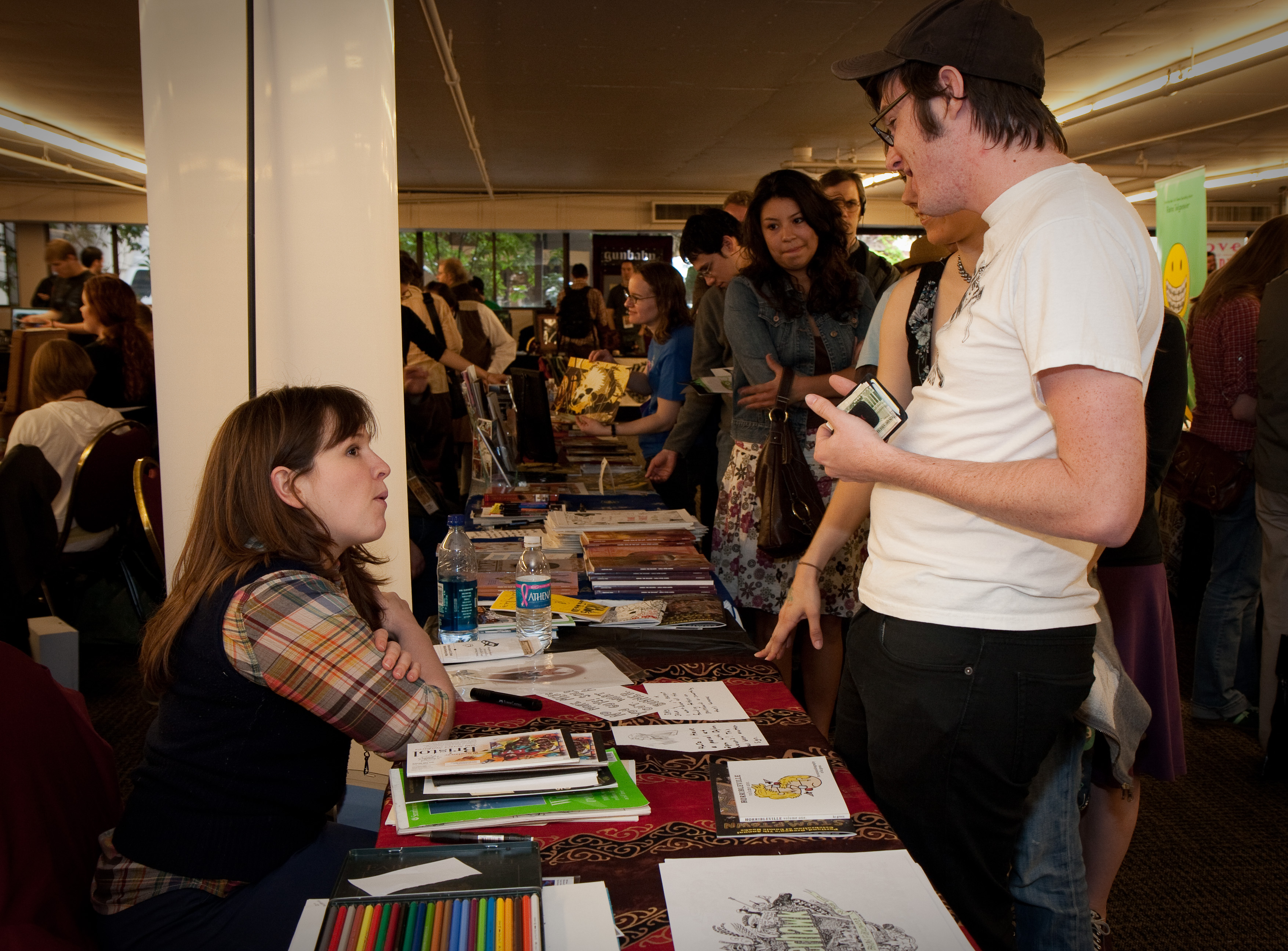
Beaton at a book signing.

Ducks has been positively received for its use of the graphic novel medium, its nuanced portrayal of life in the oil sands, and its exploration of themes such as social class, capitalism, environmentalism, and sexual harassment. Ducks is drawn in monochrome grey, and unlike Beaton's previous works, its tone is melancholic. A New Yorker review by Sam Thielman praised her drawing, calling her use of space "exceptionally skillful" in understanding how much or how little detail to give to readers. Winnipeg Free Press reviewer Nyala Ali cited Beaton's attention to scale as a way to portray smallness and vulnerability amid the grandeur of the aurora borealis or the enormity of the vast industrial works of the oil sands and vehicles such as haul trucks. Barack Obama listed the book as one of his favourites of 2022.

Many moments in the story reflect larger movements in Canada around the environment, politics, culture, and economics surrounding the oil sands. Beaton is a migrant worker; growing up in an economically depressed part of Canada, she understood that she would have to leave home to make money and repay her student debt. She and many other workers are forced to take on difficult and undesirable jobs, and there are undertones of class resentment towards those who chastise oil sands workers while their economic standing shields them from making such a difficult compromise. Most of the other workers are men, outnumbering women 50-to-1. Beaton is subjected to frequent sexual harassment, but because of her need to pay off her debt, she does not report others and continues to work.

Writing for The Guardian, Rachel Cooke wrote that Ducks "may be the best book I have ever read about sexual harassment" and called it "abidingly humane". Despite being often gawked at and facing sexist comments and escalating unwanted sexual attention, Beaton maintains sympathy for many of the men who work with her who suffer from the loneliness, physical exhaustion and illness, and homesickness that come with their itinerant work. The harassment is persistent to the point that men try to enter her room, and it is a severe drain on her physical and mental state. When a journalist asks her about it, she becomes protective of the men, believing they have been broken by the environment and culture in which they have been immersed. The book portrays a dangerous type of masculinity that appears in the context of men who are bored, isolated, in a liminal space, provided with plentiful alcohol and cocaine, and in a physically and environmentally destructive industry; Beaton wonders if, given the same circumstances, the men in her own life would turn the same, and if anyone could emerge from the oil sands unchanged.

The environment is a consistent theme in the memoir. Etelka Lehoczky of NPR draws a parallel in the story between the harassment Beaton faces and the industrial degradation of the land. She cites a conversation with a taxi driver who takes Beaton to a site with many temporary workers and states, "You be careful, young girl. You live here, they don't. Do you know how people treat a place where they don't live?" Though Beaton considers the oil sands a temporary place to live, she realizes that the industry is displacing people of the nearby First Nations and destroying their land and drinking water. She grapples with the morality of working there knowing the damage it has wrought, but ultimately needs to repay her debts. Ducks won the 2023 edition of Canada Reads, where it was championed by Mattea Roach.

== Awards ==
- Eisner Award, Best Graphic Memoir (2023) and Best Writer/Artist (2023)
- Canada Reads, 2023 Winner
- Harvey Award, Book of the Year (2023)
- Jan Michalski Prize for Literature (2024)
