= The Princess and the Pony =

2015 children's book by Kate Beaton

- Author: Kate Beaton
- Illustrator: Kate Beaton
- Language: English
- Publisher: Scholastic Books
- Publication date: 2015
- ISBN: 9780545637084

The Princess and the Pony is a 2015 children's picture book illustrated by Kate Beaton. She won the Children's Book Award in 2016 for The Princess and the Pony. It is her first book written for children.

The Princess and the Pony turns stereotypical situations up-side-down. Princess Pinecone is a "strong female character," and a warrior. She wants a warhorse for her birthday, but instead gets a very cute pony. The pony is flatulent and Princess Pinecone is very unhappy with it at first. Princess Pinecone can't teach it to fight in battle and despite this, she enters it in a tournament where the other warriors are won over by the pony's cute antics. The story is meant to be humorous. The Quill & Quire called the illustrations in the book "inclusive" because of Princess Pinecone's mixed heritage and that the warriors in the story are in "all shapes, sizes, colours and ages."

Pinecone & Pony, an animated series based on the book produced by DreamWorks Animation Television was released on April 8, 2022, on Apple TV+.

== Characters ==
- Princess Pinecone
