= Hannawald =

Hannawald is a German surname. Notable people with the surname include:

- Ernst Hannawald (born 1959), German actor
- Sven Hannawald (born 1974), German ski jumper, motor racing driver, and footballer

== See also ==
- Hanawalt
