= Morgan Murray =

Canadian writer

Morgan Murray is a Canadian writer, whose debut novel Dirty Birds was published in 2020. It was shortlisted for both the ReLit Award for fiction and the Stephen Leacock Memorial Medal for Humour in 2021.

Originally from Caroline, Alberta, he studied at the University of Calgary and Memorial University of Newfoundland. While living in Newfoundland he took a creative writing workshop led by Lisa Moore, and co-founded a writing group whose members included novelist Sharon Bala.

Dirty Birds centres on the experiences of Milton Ontario, a young aspiring writer who leaves his hometown of Bellybutton, Saskatchewan, to move to Montreal in the hopes of following in the footsteps of his idol, Leonard Cohen. In addition to its literary nominations, the book was named to the initial longlist for the 2021 edition of Canada Reads, but was not one of the final five titles selected for the competition.

As of 2021, he lives in Mabou, Nova Scotia, with his wife, cartoonist Kate Beaton.
