= The Jelly Lakes =

- Tuca & Bertie episode
- Bertie reconciling with her 12-year-old self
- Episode no.: Season 1 Episode 9
- Directed by: Amy Winfrey
- Written by: Shauna McGarry
- Editing by: Gonzalo Cordova; Karen Graci; Rachelle Williams
- Original air date: May 3, 2019

Guest appearances
- Jane Lynch as Coach Meredith Maple; Isabella Rosellini as Pat

Episode chronology
← Previous "The New Bird"	Next → "SweetBeak"

"The Jelly Lakes" is the ninth episode of the first season of the American animated sitcom series Tuca & Bertie. It was written by Shauna McGarry, and features guest appearances by Jane Lynch and Isabella Rossellini. The episode features Tuca and Bertie reconciling while on a visit to the Jelly Lakes, with Bertie coming to terms following a traumatic sexual assault she suffered when she was 12.

The episode was praised for its approach towards the subject matter, its survivor-centric storytelling, and use of visual medium. Lisa Hanawalt, series creator, chose not to depict Bertie's assault and deliberately avoided showing the perpetrator's face or hearing the perpetrator's voice. The episode additionally features an all-female cast. It was nominated for three awards during the 47th Annie Awards, of which it won one, for Shauna McGarry's writing for the episode.

== Plot ==
The episode starts directly following the previous episode, with Tuca (Tiffany Haddish) and Bertie (Ali Wong) in a car and struggling to talk to each other. An unspecified amount of time passes before Bertie abruptly stops the car as a sheep had blocked her way. As the sheep, joined with its herd, cross the road, the two break down in the car and reconcile. While Bertie stated she wanted a silent car ride to give some time to think, the two immediately break into song. The two pass a sign that denotes the Jelly Lakes are in 20 miles. Tuca takes the sign and recalls that Bertie's family had a cabin there, while Bertie attempts to deflect the matter before being cut off by a motorcyclist.

Bertie, visibly frustrated by the motorcyclist, chases her down the road to the Jelly Lakes Mall. The motorcyclist enters the mall, and Bertie angrily follows her in. Bertie, seeing a swimsuit, is visibly discomforted, but Tuca immediately distracts her by highlighting the mall had a Girl Thingz store. It immediately cuts to a Girl Thingz commercial parodying advertisements aimed at teenage girls. The two eagerly try on the store's offerings before overhearing two teenage friends who are similarly reconciling. Recalling their own experiences, the two embrace, garnering the ire of the two teenagers. The two run out of the store, with Bertie stating the two are shoplifting from Girl Thingz. The two proceed to enjoy the mall's offerings before sitting down at the food court to catch up. Bertie recalls her uncomfortable experiences with Pastry Pete and her guilt for allowing it to happen to someone else. Noticing the motorcyclist who had previously cut them off leaving the mall, the two pursue her.

The two cut off the motorcyclist and Bertie angrily confronts her before the motorcyclist takes off her helmet. It is revealed that the motorcyclist was Meredith Maple (Jane Lynch), a turaco who was Bertie's former swim coach at Jelly Lakes summer camp. Bertie eventually caves in and goes to the cabins at her invitation. The two settle down and eventually, Tuca falls asleep, Bertie walks out onto the deck and gazes toward the island at the center of the lake while ignoring her boyfriend's texts.

The two are awoken by Coach Maple, who offers them firewood. Tuca and Coach Maple tour her cabin and meet Coach Maple's wife, Pat (Isabella Rossellini). The two engage in jet skiing and Bertie tours Tuca around the Jelly Lakes. The two come across Peanut Butter Island, but Bertie avoids the topic and deflects from the issue. Tuca enters a jet ski race but Bertie falls off the back, causing her and her phone to sink into the jelly. Tuca pulls Bertie out of the water, and Bertie states her frustration and her wishes to go back to the cabin. Tuca extends a dinner invitation from Coach Maple and Bertie begrudgingly accepts.

While getting ready for dinner, Tuca is greeted with Pat's artwork. Pat decorates hollowed eggs with paper cutouts. Bertie meanwhile, is talking with Coach Maple who actively recounts her past with Bertie much to her discomfort. Coach Maple confronts Bertie about why she quit swimming, but Bertie continues to deflect the issue. After continued assertions by Coach Maple, Bertie yells at her and storms out.

Tuca catches up with Bertie while looking at the setting sun. Bertie remarks on her wish in how she wants to protect the teenagers who are playing in the water from the world and men. Bertie opens up about her experiences, with the style changing into the paper cutout style that Pat's art took the form of. Bertie had wanted to swim to Peanut Butter Island and had trained all summer to do so. On the day of the swim, she had gotten to the dock early before Coach Maple had arrived, and bought a new red swimsuit. She was accompanied by the lifeguard who had praised her for her talent at age 12, and told her he wanted to show her something in the woods. Trusting the adult, she followed him in. Bertie breaks down in tears recounting her story and Tuca comforts her. Tuca declares that Bertie should reclaim the island and make it "Peanut Bertie Island".

Tuca, waking up, finds Bertie swimming towards Peanut Butter Island. Tuca frantically informs Pat and Coach Maple, who follow her in a boat to ensure her safety. The group follows Bertie as she makes her swim but are interrupted by a giant crab who attacks Coach Maple. Bertie, out of exhaustion, sinks to the bottom of the lake, sees her 12 year old self crying alone in the woods after what had happened. She embraces her 12 year old self and the two swim to the surface together. Bertie completes the remaining stretch of her swim with her friends cheering her on. Bertie completes the swim and the group partakes in a cookout with the torn crab leg from the giant crab Coach Maple had fought. Bertie tells Tuca she's ready to go back home, and Pat remarks that she made a piece of artwork detailing their experiences.

== Production ==
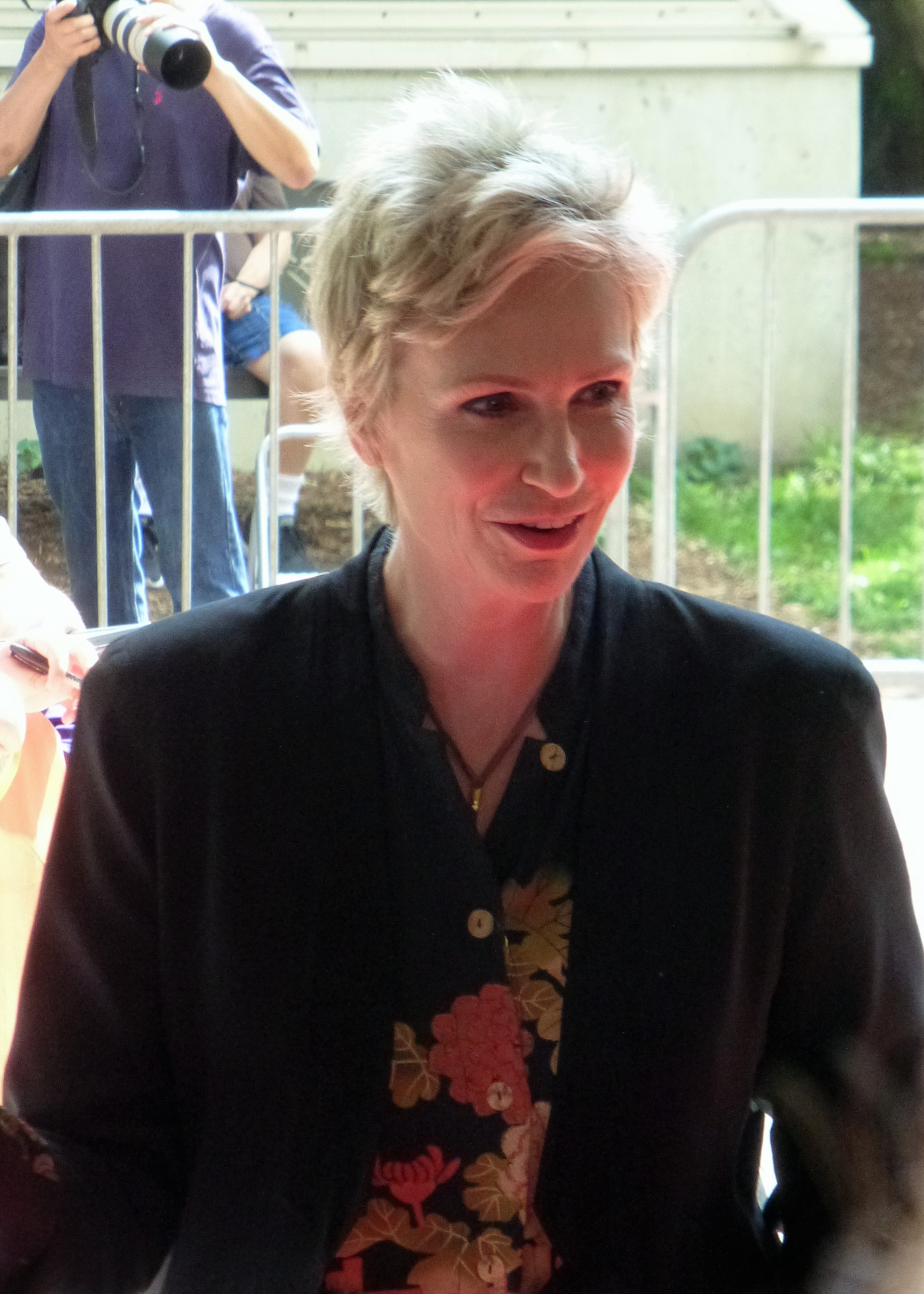
Jane Lynch plays Bertie's former swim coach Meredith Maple

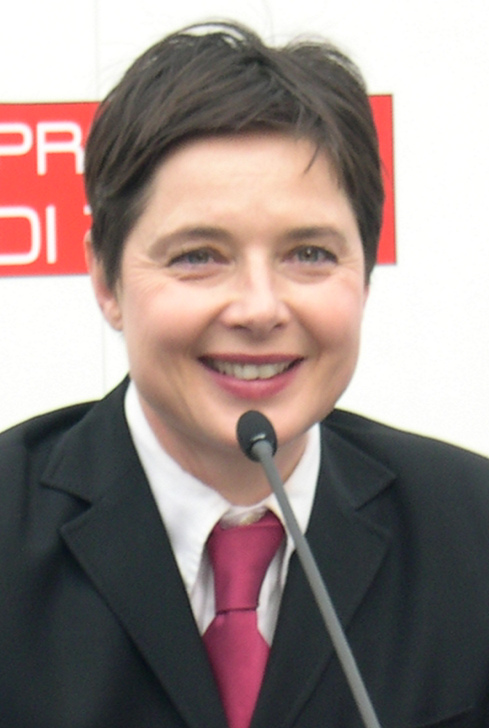
Isabella Rossellini plays Coach Maple's wife Pat

Lisa Hanawalt, in an interview to TV Guide, stated that she deliberately chose not to include a scene featuring the assault that had been inflicted upon Bertie, stating "[she] didn't want anyone to judge whether or not [Bertie] overreacted to it" but instead, Hanawalt wanted to illustrate that "something happened, and it traumatized her. And it really doesn't matter what those specifics are." In addition, the paper cutout style that was employed by the episode was made so that the man who had assaulted Bertie would have his face not shown, and avoiding hearing his voice, specifically choosing for the episode to not have any male characters in its cast.

The episode guest stars Jane Lynch as Coach Meredith Maple, a turaco who is Bertie's former swimming coach. Isabella Rossellini plays Pat, the barn owl wife of Coach Maple.

The events and the repercussions of the events leading up to and surrounding "The Jelly Lakes" would later be further discussed in the second season. In season 2 episode 5, Bertie is struggling to process fantasies involving a former abuser, eventually coming to her therapist who would explain to her that Bertie may be interested in exploring her desires in an environment where consent is prioritized. In season 2 episode 8, "Corpse Week", Bertie confronts her past trauma at Jelly Lakes head-on through confronting her family. The neglect from her parents that was faced by Bertie following her assault, and the actions that they took afterwards are shown to have taken a toll on the character and how she saw herself in the series.

== Reception ==
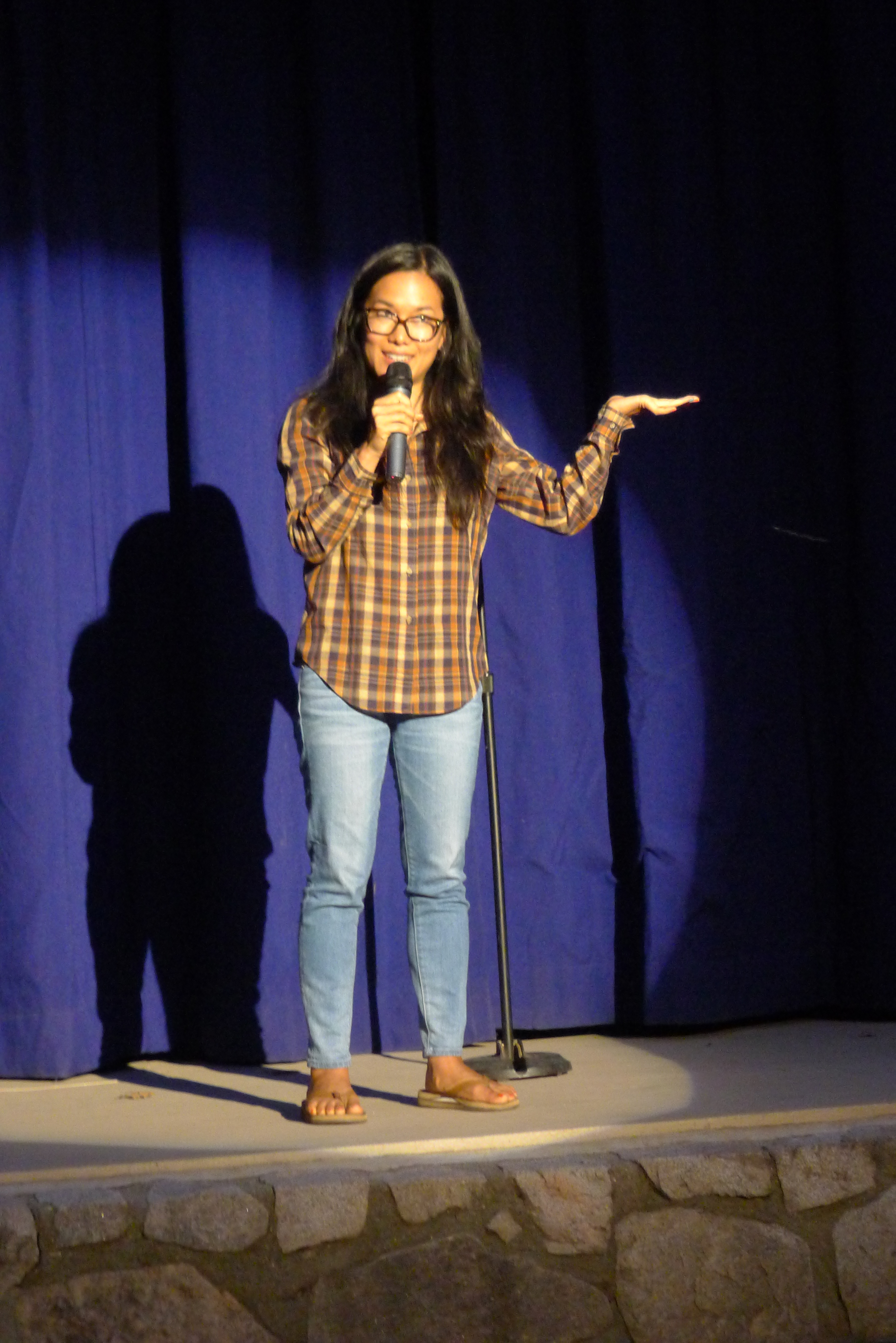
Ali Wong would be nominated in the 47th Annie Awards for her voice work in "The Jelly Lakes"

=== Critical reception ===
S.R. Westwood writing for The Mary Sue described the episode as having "beautiful visual storytelling", praising the episode for focusing on the victim's subjectivity, rather than the monstrousness of the abuse of trust that had taken place. Kylie Cheung writing for Salon.com described the writing as "thoughtful, survivor-centric" in how it spoke to a common experience for women around the world and the struggles its characters go through. Mary Retta writing in Bitch contrasted the episode's approach towards healing after a traumatizing event, while other onscreen narratives would show the embrace of another individual, Retta acknowledges how the show allowed Bertie to heal on her own. Karin Cho writing in Thought Catalog praised the episode for "artistically combining trauma and healing" and empathized with the plight of its characters. Marj Ostani writing in YLWRNGR praised Bertie's development as a character and stated she had "served as a good role model to its audience".

Kayla Cobb writing for Decider praised the fight leading up to the episode in how their "honest, painful, and stunted confrontation" and the dynamic that the two had "shaped [her] almost more than any other", stating that the show had defied a genre which had an often difficult relationship with women. Ali Mattingly writing for Nerdist praised the visual style of the episode in relation to the story that it had told, stating that the "animation takes full advantage of the medium" with regards to its approach towards trauma and its impact on an individual's life. Arielle Bernstein writing in The Week would follow up with how the visual style employed by Pat's paper cutouts "centers the victim's story and neither sensationalizes nor obscures important details". The episode was praised for the events following the episode with regards to Bertie's boyfriend's reaction following the events of the episode.

Following the show's cancellation following the first season, several writers would state their disappointment in not knowing the series' continuation following the events of The Jelly Lakes. Caroline Framke writing for Variety stated that she had never seen another show "tackle this particular horror with such care" and that the possibility of being unable to see Bertie's recovery after having unravelled her past traumas would be "downright crushing". Several other reviewers would describe the episode as a "standout" or as one of the series' best. Rotten Tomatoes: The Ultimate Binge Guide highlighted the episode for its uniquely female lens and its events as part of why there was massive backlash regarding the series' cancellation.

=== Accolades ===
The episode "The Jelly Lakes" was specifically included on several "best of" lists for the year of 2019. The episode was included on The Hollywood Reporter's "The 10 Best TV Episodes of 2019" list, Daniel Fienberg would describe it as "quite illuminating" with its embrace of the comedic elements of the show to set up a "well earned and revelatory" episode he considered a "gut punch". Entertainment Weekly would put the episode among its "The 30 best TV episodes of 2019" list at number 26, describing the episode's visuals as "unforgettable". Bitch magazine listed the episode among its "The Best Queer TV Episodes of 2019" list, praising the Coach Maple and Pat's queer relationship in how it gave tenderness during an episode which directly addresses trauma. Syndicated Magazine would put the episode in its "Syndicated's 30 Best Episodes of 2019" list, with reviewer Bob Raymonda describing the episode as "devastating stuff to witness but shows us how important Tuca and Bertie's friendship is for their overall growth and healing".

"The Jelly Lakes" was nominated for three awards during the 47th Annie Awards for the categories of Best General Audience Animated Television/Broadcast Production, Ali Wong for her performance in the episode for Outstanding Achievement for Voice Acting in an Animated Television / Broadcast Production, and Shauna McGarry for Outstanding Achievement for Writing in an Animated Television / Broadcast Production. McGarry would go on to win the prize for her writing on the episode.
