= Domitille Collardey =

French cartoonist and comic book designer

Domitille Collardey (born 1981) is a French cartoonist and comic book designer. She is best known for founding the Chicou-Chicou comics collective with Aude Picault. She lives in Paris and Brooklyn, New York, USA.

She is a former member of the cartoon studio Pizza Island, where she worked alongside cartoonists including Kate Beaton, Lisa Hanawalt, and Meredith Gran.

== Education ==
Domitille graduated from les Arts Decoratifs de Paris in 2004.

== Comics ==
Domitille founded and participated in the project Chicou-Chicou with Aude Picault, Lisa Mandel, Boulet (the pen name of Gilles Roussel), and Erwann Surcouf for three years. A 485-page compilation of the artists' work was published by French publisher Delcourt in November 2008, in the Lewis Trondheim imprint Shampooing. Lewis Trondheim, Ruppert et Mulot, and Émile Bravo have made guest appearances in Chicou-Chicou.

Domitille collaborated with journalist Jacques Braunstein on "Famille recompose toi", published in 2008 by Hachette Litératures.

She is currently working with Olivier Ka on an adaptation of Jean Teulé's novel The Suicide Shop for French publisher Delcourt.

She works for various press publications, such as Technikart, Beaux Arts Magazine, and Double.

== Personal life ==
Collardey is married to singer-songwriter, actor, and visual artist Tunde Adebimpe, with whom she has a daughter, Echo.
