= Philip Hanawalt =

American biologist (born 1931)

Philip Courtland Hanawalt
- Born: 1931 (age 94–95); Akron, Ohio, U.S.
- Education: Deep Springs College; Yale University, Oberlin College
- Known for: discovery of the process of repair replication of damaged DNA and the ubiquitous process of DNA excision repair.
- Spouse: Graciela Spivak
- Children: 4, including Lisa Hanawalt
- Scientific career
- Fields: biophysics, cancer biology, dermatology
- Workplaces: University of Copenhagen; California Institute of Technology; Stanford University
- Doctoral advisor: Richard Setlow

Philip C. Hanawalt (born 1931) is an American biologist who discovered the process of repair replication of damaged DNA in 1963. He is also considered the co-discoverer of the ubiquitous process of DNA excision repair along with his mentor, Richard Setlow, and Paul Howard-Flanders. He holds the Dr. Morris Herzstein Professorship in the Department of Biology at Stanford University, with a joint appointment in the Dermatology Department in Stanford University School of Medicine.

== Early life and education ==
Philip C. Hanawalt was born on 1931 in Akron, Ohio. He was raised in Midland, Michigan. Having an interest in electronics from youth, Hanawalt earned an honorable mention in the 1949 Westinghouse Science Talent Search, receiving a scholarship to attend Deep Springs College. Hanawalt eventually transferred to Oberlin College where he received his B.A. degree in physics in 1954. He received his M.S. degree in physics from Yale University in 1955. Hanawalt also received his Ph.D. in biophysics from Yale University in 1959. His doctoral thesis advisor was Richard Setlow.

He undertook three years of postdoctoral study at the University of Copenhagen, Denmark, and at the California Institute of Technology before joining the faculty at Stanford in 1961.

== DNA repair ==
DNA repair is the process by which all living cells deal with damage to their genetic material. Such damage occurs as a consequence of exposure to environmental radiations and genotoxic chemicals, but also to endogenous oxidations and the intrinsic instability of DNA. Hanawalt and his colleagues discovered a special pathway of excision repair, called transcription-coupled repair, which is targeted to expressed genes, and he studies several diseases characterized by defects in DNA repair pathways. DNA repair is important for protecting against cancer and some aspects of ageing in humans, and its deficiency has been implicated in the etiology of a number of hereditary diseases.

== Career ==
In 1965 Hanawalt became associate professor in the Department of Biological Sciences at Stanford, and was promoted to professor in 1970.

He has served on the board of trustees and is now an Honorary Trustee of Oberlin College. He has received an Honorary Doctor of Science Degree from Oberlin and the Doctor Honoris Causa from both the University of Seville, Spain, and the University of the Bío-Bío, Chile.

Hanawalt was elected to the United States National Academy of Sciences in 1989, and to the American Academy of Arts and Sciences in 2008. He is a Fellow of the American Association for the Advancement of Science and the American Academy of Microbiology, and he is a Foreign Associate of the European Molecular Biology Organization (EMBO). He currently serves on the editorial board of the Proceedings of the National Academy of Sciences, and as a Senior Editor for the journal, Cancer Research. He has served on the board of directors for the American Association for Cancer Research (AACR). He has served on many editorial boards and advisory committees in academia and government.

He has trained 29 Ph.D. students at Stanford and many postdoctoral researchers. Thirty-five different countries are represented among the participants in his research group over the past 48 years.

== Awards and honors ==
Hanawalt won the Excellence in Teaching Award from the Northern California chapter of Phi Beta Kappa in 1991, and the Peter and Helen Bing Award for Distinguished Teaching at Stanford University. He has won annual research awards from the American Society for Photobiology and the Environmental Mutagen Society (EMS) in 1992, from which he also received the annual Student Mentoring Award.

He won the International Mutation Research Award for Excellence in Scientific Achievement in 1987, and the Princess Takamatsu Cancer Foundation Annual Lectureship in Japan in 1999 and he was more recently a visiting scholar at the Graduate School of Frontier Biosciences, Osaka University.

He has served as president of the EMS and was the president/organizer of the 9th International Conference on Environmental Mutagens (ICEM) in San Francisco in 2005. In 2009 he delivered the Keynote Lecture for the 10th ICEM in Florence, Italy. He has organized many meetings on DNA repair, including the first international conference in this field, at Squaw Valley, CA, in 1974, and subsequent Gordon Conferences on Mutagenesis and on Mammalian DNA Repair.

Hanawalt was elected to membership in the US National Academy of Sciences in 1989.

== Personal life ==
Hanawalt is married to Graciela Spivak and has 4 children, the first two children from a previous marriage to Joanna Thomas Hanawalt: David, Steve, Alex, and famed cartoonist and television producer, Lisa Hanawalt. Hanawalt lives in Palo Alto, California.
