= Tuca & Bertie =

American adult animated comedy television series

- Genre: Adult animation; Animated sitcom; Comedy-drama; Surreal humor; Slice of life
- Created by: Lisa Hanawalt
- Based on: Tuca the Toucan by Lisa Hanawalt
- Voices of: Tiffany Haddish; Ali Wong; Steven Yeun
- Theme music composer: Jesse Novak
- Composer: Jesse Novak
- Country of origin: United States
- Original language: English
- No. of seasons: 3
- No. of episodes: 30 (list of episodes)

Production
- Executive producers: Lisa Hanawalt; Raphael Bob-Waksberg; Noel Bright; Steven A. Cohen; Tiffany Haddish; Ali Wong
- Producers: Alex Bulkley; Corey Campodonico; Richard Choi; Mike Hollingsworth; Steven Yeun; Gonzalo Cordova; Eric Blyler; Samantha Irby; Alison Dubois; David Ichioka
- Running time: 22–26 minutes
- Production companies: The Tornante Company; Brave Dummy; Boxer vs. Raptor (season 1); Vegan Blintzes (seasons 2–3); ShadowMachine; Williams Street (seasons 2–3)

Original release
- Network: Netflix
- Release: May 3, 2019
- Network: Adult Swim
- Release: June 13, 2021 – August 29, 2022

Tuca & Bertie is an American adult animated sitcom created by cartoonist Lisa Hanawalt for Netflix. It began streaming on May 3, 2019. It stars Tiffany Haddish and Ali Wong, alongside Steven Yeun, with a supporting cast including John Early, Richard E. Grant, and Reggie Watts. The show's central characters are two anthropomorphic female birds: Tuca the toucan and Bertie the song thrush. Episodes mainly focus on the two's relationships with each other and with their peers.

The first season received positive reviews, and was cited as one of the best shows of 2019 by several publications. The series was canceled by Netflix after one season in July 2019. In May 2020, Cartoon Network's nighttime Adult Swim programming block announced they had ordered a second season of the series, which premiered on June 13, 2021. In August 2021, the series was renewed for a third season which premiered on July 10, 2022. Tuca & Bertie has received critical acclaim for its portrayal of adulthood and friendship-driven themes, as well as its humor and art style.

In November 2022, Hanawalt confirmed that Adult Swim canceled the series after two seasons on its programming block, and three seasons total.

== Premise ==
The show's title characters, Tuca Toucan (left) and Roberta "Bertie" Songthrush (right)

The show's title characters are two anthropomorphic birds who are friends living in the same apartment complex, Tuca Toucan (voiced by Tiffany Haddish) and Roberta "Bertie" Songthrush (voiced by Ali Wong). Tuca is a toucan with an impulsive personality, while Bertie is a nervous and career-minded song thrush. At the start of the series, Tuca has just ceased drinking alcohol. To support herself, she often relies on various odd jobs for financial gain. At the same time, Bertie works at an office called Conde Nest while also holding an apprentice job at a bakery. The series' main plot lines focuses on the protagonists' friendship and their struggles in adulthood, touching on themes such as alcoholism and sexual abuse.

Many of Tuca's plot lines involve her wealthy aunt Tallulah (voiced by Jenifer Lewis). Other relationships of hers vary from episode to episode.

== Cast and characters ==
=== Main ===
- Tiffany Haddish as Tuca Toucan, a blue toucan, Bertie's impulsive and newly sober best friend who works odd jobs and often relies on her wealthy Aunt Tallulah for financial support.
- Ali Wong as Roberta "Bertie" Songthrush, a brown song thrush, Tuca's career-minded best friend, a senior operations analyst (previously a data processor) at Conde Nest, and aspiring baker.
- Steven Yeun as Speckle, a robin, Bertie's strait-laced architect boyfriend.

=== Recurring ===
- Nicole Byer as various voices including Speckle's grandmother Gamby the ghost cake; Bertie's file cabinet; lady in the bathroom at Bertie's office.
- Richard E. Grant as Holland, Bertie's well-meaning but oblivious blue jay boss at Conde Nest.
- John Early as Dirk, Bertie's lecherous, previously misogynistic rooster co-worker at Conde Nest and as Dapper Dog, a flamboyant Tolling Retriever.
- Reggie Watts as Pastry Pete, a emperor penguin that works as a chef in a bakery that takes Bertie as an apprentice.
- Shamir as Draca, a Dracaena fragrans who is the neighbor of by Tuca and Bertie.
- Jenifer Lewis as Aunt Tallulah Toucan, Tuca's rich aunt who has been supporting her financially.
- Taraji P. Henson (first appearance) and Natasha Rothwell (second appearance) as Terry Toucan, Tuca's oldest sister.
- Kate Berlant as a gold dust day gecko known as the "Women Taking Up Space" Lady.
- Pamela Adlon as Dr. Joanne, an olive sparrow who is Bertie's therapist.
- Sasheer Zamata as Kara, a seagull nurse who becomes Tuca's girlfriend but later breaks up.
- Adam Conover as Big_Hairy_Stallion69 (aka Joel), a red and white paint horse whom Tuca met online. He later becomes gaming buddies with Speckle.
- Whitmer Thomas as The Deli Guy, a golden snub-nosed monkey who works at a delicatessen.
- Patti Harrison as Martha, a female cactus living in the same building as Tuca and Bertie.
- Matthew Rhys as Figgy, a fig tree whom Tuca begins dating in season 3.
- Justina Machado as Winter Garcia, a bluebird who hires Bertie to be a chef in season 3.

== Episodes ==
Series overview
| Season | Episodes | Originally released | | |
| Season | Episodes | First released | Last released | Network |
|---|---|---|---|---|
| 1 | 10 | May 3, 2019 | | Netflix |
| 2 | 10 | June 13, 2021 | August 15, 2021 | Adult Swim |
| 3 | 10 | July 11, 2022 | August 29, 2022 | Adult Swim |

== Production ==
=== Development ===
Tuca originated in Lisa Hanawalt's webcomic Tuca the Toucan which ran from 2013 to 2014. On February 20, 2018, Netflix announced it had given the production a series order to consist of a first season of ten episodes. The series was created by Lisa Hanawalt who executive produced alongside Raphael Bob-Waksberg, Noel Bright, Steven A. Cohen, and Tiffany Haddish. Production companies involved in the series include The Tornante Company and ShadowMachine. On March 14, 2019, Netflix announced that the series would premiere on May 3, and a first look featurette trailer was released.

=== Casting ===
Alongside the initial series announcement, it was reported that Tiffany Haddish would voice the lead character of Tuca. On May 7, 2018, it was announced that Ali Wong had been cast as the voice of Bertie. In March 2019, it was announced Steven Yeun had been cast as a series regular, with Nicole Byer, Richard E. Grant, John Early, Reggie Watts, Tig Notaro, Amber Ruffin, Jermaine Fowler, and Tessa Thompson appearing in guest capacity.

Broadcast

The show started airing on TBS on July 25, 2021. In the UK and Ireland, the series aired on E4. Episodes were also available on the Channel 4 streaming service.

=== Netflix cancellation ===
Netflix announced the series cancellation on July 24, 2019. In a series of tweets responding to the news, Hanawalt expressed gratitude for the cast, crew, reviews, and fans. Hanawalt and Haddish both expressed hope that the show could find a new home.

The announcement of the show's cancellation was met with a negative response. Within 24 hours of the cancellation, the Twitter hashtags #RenewTucaAndBertie and #SaveTucaAndBertie each received more than 10,000 tweets from users. A Change.org petition to renew the show gained media attention and received 3,600 signatures in 24 hours. Various news and lifestyle sites published columns lamenting the cancellation, while continuing to praise the show for its female representation, diverse cast, and handling of complex issues. The cancellation was deemed to be "disappointing" and a "loss for television".

The cancellation also led to criticism of Netflix's algorithm, highlighted by its failure to recommend the show to creator Hanawalt, and at Netflix itself for prematurely canceling the series less than three months after its premiere, disallowing the show a chance to grow its audience.

=== Adult Swim revival ===
According to Hanawalt, several networks showed interest in picking up the show after its cancellation; however, she felt Adult Swim was the best home for the show to continue. On May 22, 2020, it was announced that the series would be revived on Adult Swim in 2021, making it the second Netflix original series to be revived coming off the cancellation of One Day at a Time in 2019. The revival was named one of IndieWire's "Most Anticipated TV Shows of 2021". On May 3, 2021, it was announced that the second season would premiere on June 13, 2021. The second season ran for ten episodes. The second season is available to stream on HBO Max on June 24, 2022. On August 4, 2021, Adult Swim renewed the series for a third season. The third season ran for ten episodes and is also available to stream on HBO Max.

On November 2, 2022, Hanawalt confirmed that Adult Swim canceled the series after two seasons on the network.

== Reception ==
=== Critical reception ===
==== Season 1 ====
On review aggregator Rotten Tomatoes, the first season holds an approval rating of 98% based on 48 reviews, with an average rating of 8.2/10. The website's critical consensus reads, "Tuca & Bertie skips right past BoJack Horseman's shadow with its chipper sensibility and madcap sight gags, bringing plenty of laughs as it addresses adulting anxiety and exalts the joys of friendship." On Metacritic, it has a weighted average score of 82 out of 100, based on 26 critics, indicating "universal acclaim".

In a positive review, Kate Abbott of The Guardian wrote that the show was "a chirpily realised world that stays true to its experimentalism - and its pleasures are consistent, if deliciously twisted, and very surreal indeed." James Poniewozik of The New York Times, praised "Hanawalt's surreal vision, the anarchic fluidity of the landscape, the series's whimsically bending laws of both nature and physics." Critics praised the show's female-focused portrayal of trauma, desire, and friendship. In a negative review, Brian Lowry of CNN wrote that the show did not stand out beyond similar adult animations on Adult Swim, declaring that the show was "strictly for the birds". The show drew both praise and criticism for perceived similarities to Comedy Central's Broad City, due to both shows focusing on female friendship.

==== Season 2 ====
The second season has a 100% approval rating on Rotten Tomatoes based on 20 reviews, with an average rating of 8.29/10. The website's critical consensus states, "Tuca & Bertie's superb second season is as vivid and sparkling as the first, diving deeper into its dynamic leads without losing any of its singular humor." On Metacritic, it has a weighted average score of 87 out of 100, based on 9 critics, indicating "universal acclaim". In a positive review, Dan Feinberg of The Hollywood Reporter wrote "the show has become a savvy vehicle through which to explore repressed trauma, workplace sexism and what may be the most simultaneously nurturing and corrosive friendship on TV". Melanie McFarland of Slate praised the show for demonstrating "that shows created in and for the female gaze are inclusive and appealing to everybody" and "reminding us of the many ways that animation tells multi-dimensional stories that speak to everybody, not just the guys".

==== Season 3 ====
The third season has a 100% approval rating on Rotten Tomatoes based on 9 reviews, with an average rating of 8.4/10.

=== Awards and accolades ===
Upon release, The A.V. Club referred to the show as "one of the best new shows of 2019," with Vox naming Tuca & Bertie one of the "5 best TV Shows of May 2019". HuffPost named it as 6th best show of 2019, Indiewire named it as the 2nd best new show of 2019 and the 20th best show of the decade, and TV Guide named it one of the best animated TV shows of the decade. In addition, The A.V. Club named it the 18th best show of 2019 and Junkee placed it on an unranked list of the best TV of 2019. Specific praise was given to the episode "The Jelly Lakes", with both Entertainment Weekly and The Hollywood Reporter naming it one of the best episodes of 2019.

Tuca & Bertie has won two awards and been nominated for an additional fifteen. It won the 2020 Annie Award for Outstanding Achievement in Writing for Shauna McGarry, along with nominations for Animated Television General Audience and Voice Acting for Ali Wong, all for "The Jelly Lakes". At the 2022 Annies "The Dance" was nominated for Best General Audience Animated Television, and Lisa Hanawalt was nominated for Outstanding Writing in an Animated Television Production for "Planteau". At the 2023 Annies "The Pain Garden" was nominated for Best Mature Audience Animated Television Production and Outstanding Achievement for Writing, again for Hanawalt.

Lisa Hanawalt won the 2022 Writers Guild of America Award for Animation: Television for her work on "Planteau", and was nominated the following year for "The Pain Garden".

Ali Wong received an Emmy Award nomination for Outstanding Character Voice-Over Performance in 2023.

Tuca & Bertie has also received nominations at the Dorian Awards, Gotham Awards, Hollywood Critics Association TV Awards, International Online Cinema Awards, Online Film & Television Association Awards, and the Society of Voice Arts and Sciences Awards.

Awards and nominations received by Bob's Burgers
| Award | Year (Note: The listed year refers to the date of the ceremony, not necessarily the year in which the corresponding season or episode aired.) | Category | Nominee(s) | Result | Ref. |
|---|---|---|---|---|---|
| Annie Awards | 2020 | Best General Audience Animated Television/Broadcast Production | "The Jelly Lakes" | Nominated | |
| Annie Awards | 2020 | Outstanding Achievement for Voice Acting in an Animated Television/Broadcast Production | Ali Wong - (for "The Jelly Lakes") | Nominated | |
| Annie Awards | 2020 | Outstanding Achievement for Writing in an Animated Television/Broadcast Production | Shauna McGarry - (for "The Jelly Lakes") | Won | |
| Annie Awards | 2022 | Best General Audience Animated Television/Broadcast Production | "The Dance" | Nominated | |
| Annie Awards | 2022 | Outstanding Achievement for Writing in an Animated Television / Broadcast Production | Lisa Hanawalt - (for "Planteau") | Nominated | |
| Annie Awards | 2023 | Best Mature Audience Animated Television/Broadcast Production | "The Pain Garden" | Nominated | |
| Annie Awards | 2023 | Outstanding Achievement for Writing in an Animated Television / Broadcast Production | Lisa Hanawalt - (for "The Pain Garden") | Nominated | |
| Dorian Awards | 2022 | Best Animated Show | Tuca & Bertie | Nominated | |
| Gotham Awards | 2019 | Breakthrough Series – Short Form | Tuca & Bertie | Nominated | |
| Hollywood Critics Association TV Awards | 2022 | Best Broadcast Network or Cable Animated Series or Television Movie | Tuca & Bertie | Nominated | |
| International Online Cinema Awards TV | 2019 | Animated Program | Tuca & Bertie | Nominated | |
| Online Film & Television Association Awards - Television | 2019 | Best Animated Program | Tuca & Bertie | Nominated | |
| Online Film & Television Association Awards - Television | 2019 | Best New Theme Song in a Series | Tuca & Bertie | Nominated | |
| Primetime Emmy Awards | 2023 | Outstanding Character Voice-Over Performance | Ali Wong - (for "Fledging Day") | Nominated | |
| SOVAS Awards | 2019 | Outstanding Animation - Tv, Film or Gaming - Best Spanish Voiceover | Tuca & Bertie | Nominated | |
| Writers Guild of America Awards | 2022 | Television: Animation | Lisa Hanawalt - (for "Planteau") | Won | |
| Writers Guild of America Awards | 2023 | Television: Animation | Lisa Hanawalt - (for "The Pain Garden") | Nominated | |
