= J. D. Hanawalt =

American physicist (c.1903–1987)

J. Donald "Don" Hanawalt (c. 1903 – June 26, 1987) was an American physicist who joined The Dow Chemical Company in 1931 and became a Corporate Vice President by 1953. He co-authored (with Harold W. "Sid" Rinn) an article titled, "The Identification of Crystalline Materials" which, along with a 1938 publication titled, Chemical Analysis by X-Ray Diffraction: Classification and Use of X-Ray Diffraction Patterns, are considered the foundations of powder X-ray diffraction as an analytical technique. The work is still in use today as part of the powder diffraction file (PDF) published by the International Centre for Diffraction Data (ICDD), a non-profit scientific organization dedicated to collecting, editing, publishing, and distributing powder diffraction data for the identification of materials. The membership of the ICDD consists of worldwide representation from academe, government, and industry.

The ICDD presents an award bearing Hanawalt's name every three years to recognize distinguished, recent work in the field of powder diffraction in honor of his contributions.
