= Lisa Hanawalt =

American illustrator and TV producer (born 1983)

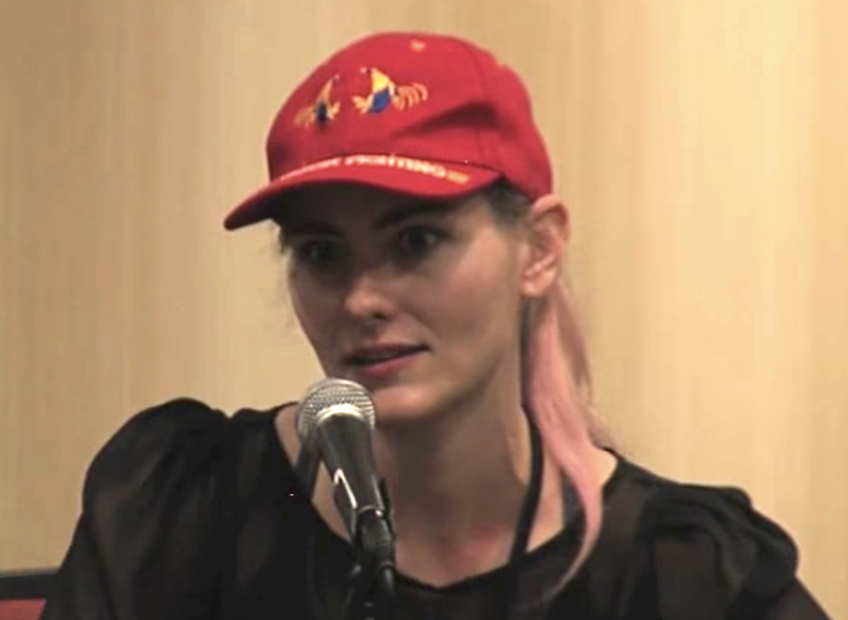
- Hanawalt speaking at the Small Press Expo in 2016
- Born: June 1983 (age 43) Palo Alto, California, U.S.
- Areas: Illustrator; cartoonist; production designer; producer; writer
- Notable works: BoJack Horseman, Tuca & Bertie, Long Story Short
- Awards: Full list

Lisa Hanawalt (born June 1983) is an American illustrator, writer, and cartoonist. She has published comic series, as well as three books of illustrations. She worked as the production designer and a producer of the Netflix animated series BoJack Horseman (2014–2020), and co-hosted the podcast Baby Geniuses (2012–2024) with comedian Emily Heller. She created and executive produced the Netflix/Adult Swim animated series Tuca & Bertie (2019–2022). She reteamed with Bojack Horseman creator Raphael Bob-Waksberg on Long Story Short (2025–present), an animated comedy-drama.

== Life and career ==
=== Early life ===
Hanawalt was born in Palo Alto, California, to Stanford biologists Philip Hanawalt and Graciela Spivak. Her mother was born and raised in Argentina by a family of Jewish refugees originally from Odesa.

Hanawalt was educated at Henry M. Gunn High School. She attended UCLA, graduating with a B.A. in art in 2006.

=== Work as cartoonist and illustrator ===
She is a former member of Pizza Island, a cartoonist's studio in Greenpoint, Brooklyn, which included cartoonists Kate Beaton, Domitille Collardey, Sarah Glidden, Meredith Gran, and Julia Wertz.

Her illustrations and writings have been published in print and online periodicals including The New York Times, McSweeney's, Vanity Fair, and Lucky Peach magazine. From 2011 through 2013, she was a regular contributor to The Hairpin and produced a series of illustrated film reviews.

Her first comic series, I Want You, was published in 2009 by Buenaventura Press. In 2010, Hanawalt was the first woman to win an Ignatz Award for Outstanding Comic, for "I Want You #1." In 2012, she illustrated her first children's book, Benny's Brigade, published by McSweeney's and authored by Arthur Bradford. The book stars a tiny talking walrus, rescued by two sisters with a range of magical animals at the end of the quest. The book was named a "Wildest Book of the Year" by children's lit blog 100 Scope Notes and called "exuberant and imaginative" by Foreword Reviews. The book's jacket reverse folds out into an oversized poster featuring Hanawalt's creatures from the book.

In 2013, Drawn & Quarterly published My Dirty Dumb Eyes, Hanawalt's "one-woman anthology" of comics and illustrations, including previously-commissioned works. The collected stories and shorts range from autobiographical narratives to cultural observations, frequently featuring anthropomorphic animal-people and scenes of nature rendered in bright, detailed watercolors, and likened by one reviewer to "a grown-up Richard Scarry turned absurdist social commentator."

In 2016, Drawn & Quarterly published Hot Dog Taste Test. This book is a collection of comics and illustrations often featuring animal-people in vibrant watercolors. Publishers Weekly said about her book, "Hanawalt takes a kebab skewer to the pomposity that's grown up around food and dining. The cartoons evoke an idiosyncratic absurdity akin to Roz Chast's work."

On August 21, 2018, Hanawalt released a graphic novel with Drawn & Quarterly entitled Coyote Doggirl. Unlike her previous two, Coyote Doggirl features a singular narrative and follows its titular character and her trusty steed, Red, on their escape from a vengeful bulldog and his cronies.

In 2020, Drawn & Quarterly published a collection of Hanawalt's early comics, I Want You, with a contemporary introduction.

=== Work in television ===
The Netflix animated television series BoJack Horseman, which debuted in 2014, is designed by Hanawalt. She has been friends with show creator Raphael Bob-Waksberg since high school and previously worked with him on the webcomic Tip Me Over, Pour Me Out.

In 2019, Netflix released Tuca & Bertie, an adult animated comedy created by Hanawalt, starring Tiffany Haddish and Ali Wong. Critics called Tuca & Bertie one of the best new shows of 2019, and the show holds a rating of 100% on the review aggregator Rotten Tomatoes. Netflix cancelled the series after its first season, however the show was revived by Adult Swim in 2020.

In 2019, Hanawalt joined other WGA writers in firing their agents as part of the WGA's stand against the ATA and the practice of packaging.

Hanawalt appeared on the October 13, 2020, episode of The George Lucas Talk Show with fellow guest Ken Jennings.

In August 2024, Netflix announced a new adult animated comedy series titled Long Story Short, created, written and executive-produced by Bob-Waksberg, with Hanawalt serving as the supervising producer as well as designing original art for the series. The show was released on August 22, 2025.

In 2026, Hanawalt appeared on the eighth season of the comedy game show Game Changer as a contestant alongside Zac Oyama and Lily Du.

== Personal life ==
She was previously in a 15-year relationship with comedian and TV host Adam Conover.

She owns a Norwegian Fjord horse, Juniper.

== Awards and recognition ==
Print magazine named Hanawalt one of the best new, young designers in 2013. Her illustrated short story "On the Trail with Wylie" won a James Beard Foundation Award for humor writing in 2014.

=== Awards ===
- 2009 Ignatz Award for Outstanding Minicomic, Stay Away from Other People
- 2010 Ignatz Award for Outstanding Comic, I Want You
- 2011 Stumptown Award for Best Small Press, I Want You #2
- 2013 Society of Illustrators Silver Medal in Editorial Illustration, "Birch Trees"
- 2014 James Beard Journalism Award for Humor, "On the Trail With Wylie", Lucky Peach
- 2016 Critics' Choice Award for Best Animated Series, BoJack Horseman
- 2022 Writers Guild of America Award for Animation for the episode "Planteau" from Tuca and Bertie.

=== Nominations ===
- 2013 James Beard Journalism Award for Humor, "The Secret Lives of Chefs," Lucky Peach
- 2015 James Beard Journalism Award for Humor, "Goodbye to all that sugar, spice, fat," Lucky Peach

== Selected works ==
- 2012. Benny's Brigade, by Arthur Bradford. McSweeney's. ISBN 978-1-93636-561-6
- 2013. My Dirty, Dumb Eyes. Drawn & Quarterly. ISBN 978-1-77046-116-1
- 2016. Hot Dog Taste Test. Drawn & Quarterly. ISBN 978-1-77046-237-3
- 2018. Coyote Doggirl. Drawn & Quarterly. ISBN 978-1-77046-325-7
- 2020. I Want You. Drawn & Quarterly. ISBN 978-1-77046-388-2
