= Hark! A Vagrant =

Webcomic by Kate Beaton (2007–2018)

- Cover for the 2011 print collection
- Author: Kate Beaton
- Website: Hark, a Vagrant
- Current status/schedule: Completed
- Launch date: 2007
- End date: 2018
- Genre: Comedy

Hark! A Vagrant is a webcomic published by Canadian artist Kate Beaton between 2007 and 2018. It discussed historical and literary topics in a comedic tone and was drawn in black and white.

== Recurring themes ==
Hark! A Vagrant is best known for its humorous treatment of historical figures and events. Beaton began drawing history-themed comics for her student newspaper, The Argosy, while studying History and Anthropology at Mount Allison University. Historical personages that have made appearances in the comic include Napoléon Bonaparte, Ada Lovelace, Marie Antoinette, and the Founding Fathers of the United States. Literary figures feature prominently, such as the Brontë sisters, and several strips parody classic literary works such as Robinson Crusoe and Sherlock Holmes. The humour in Beaton's historical and literary strips often derives from anachronisms, such as historical characters expressing modern colloquialisms and sensibilities.

Other recurring subjects in the comic include superheroes, Nancy Drew stories, and autobiographical topics.

Hark! A Vagrant has been noted for its feminist themes, and Beaton has described herself as "naturally drawn to women’s history". She is particularly well known for her series of "Strong Female Characters" strips, which satirise sexist depictions of female characters in comics and movies.

== Style ==
Hark! A Vagrant is drawn in black and white with pens, watercolours, brush pens, and a Wacom tablet in later comics. Beaton's distinctive drawing style is loose and light, and has been compared to the illustrations of Quentin Blake. Reviews have remarked on her mastery of facial expressions in particular.

Most strips are short, about three to eight panels long. Beaton often eschews punctuation in her dialogue, and the tone of the comic has been described as "conversational".

== Reception ==
The 2011 print collection of Hark! A Vagrant was named one of the top ten fiction books of the year by Time magazine, and Rolling Stone magazine placed the same collection on its list of 'The 50 Best Non-Superhero Graphic Novels'. Maria Popova, in The Atlantic, called the book "a witty and wonderful collection of comics about historical and literary figures and events", and praised Beaton's "truly special gift for simple, subtle, incredibly expressive caricature". Alex Manley, writing for Maisonneuve, wrote that "the collection reveals Beaton's flair for marrying dry historical facts of varying arcanity with cheap, childish gags in a way that never seems to get old."

== Awards ==
Year	Award	Work	Category	Result
2009	Doug Wright Award	Hark! A Vagrant	Best Emerging Talent	Won
2010	Harvey Award	Hark! A Vagrant	Best online comics work	Nominated
2011	Harvey Award	Hark! A Vagrant	Best online comics work	Won
2011	Eagle Award	Hark! A Vagrant	Favourite Web-Based Comic	Nominated
2011	Ignatz Award	Hark! A Vagrant	Outstanding Online Comic	Won
2012	Harvey Award	Hark! A Vagrant	Best online comics work	Won
2012	Doug Wright Award	Hark! A Vagrant	Best Book	Won

== Collections ==
- Never Learn Anything From History (2009)
- Hark! A Vagrant (Drawn & Quarterly, 2011)
- Step Aside, Pops (Drawn & Quarterly, 2015)
