= Octopus Pie =

Webcomic

- Author: Meredith Gran
- Website: www.octopuspie.com
- Launch date: May 14, 2007
- End date: June 5, 2017
- Genre(s): Life, humor

Octopus Pie is a webcomic written and drawn by Meredith Gran, and coloured by Valerie Halla and Sloane Leong. It focuses on the misadventures of two 20-something women living in Brooklyn, New York. It was updated every Monday, Wednesday and Friday. 1026 strips were published. The comic has been featured in an article in the New York Daily News.

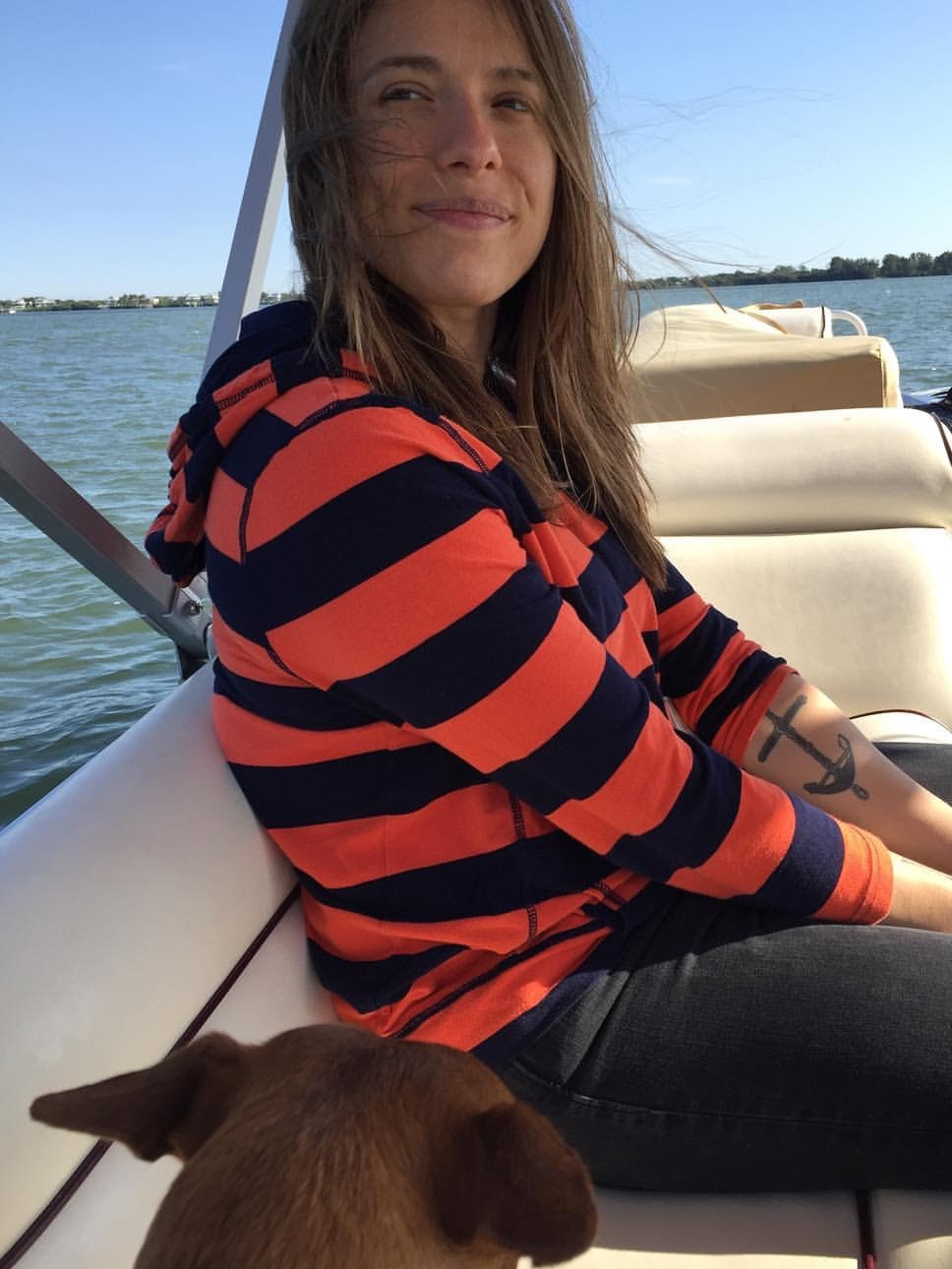
Meredith Gran on a boat with her dog in 2015.

Octopus Pie ended on June 5, 2017, with an epilogue, Octopus Pie: The Other Side running from March 1 to April 7, 2021. Another follow-up, Octopus Pie Eternal was published on November 23, 2022.

== Content ==
The comic largely follows a character-based narrative, mixing drama and light humor that sometimes borders on the surreal. With some swearing and partial nudity, it greatly relies on the juxtaposition of the two protagonists, as well as their relationships with and the relationships between other characters. Octopus Pie has the feel of an indie comic, focusing on young urbanites, usually from Generation Y. As character arcs progress, the story becomes more focused on themes of growth and aging, exploring the anxieties of quarter-life crises. While Octopus Pie is primarily a humorous strip, it has dealt with wider social issues, such as the right for women to go topless.

== Main characters ==
Everest "Eve" Ning - Eve is a creative writing graduate from Brooklyn who has already become embittered at just about every aspect of her life, and the universe in general. Grumpy, cynical, and introverted, Eve has a menial job at Olly's Organix, an organic grocer, and has no clear idea about what she wants to do with her future. Early chapters of the strip focused on Eve's initially rocky relationship with her roommate Hanna, but the two have since become very close friends, despite their contrasting personalities and lifestyles. Eve's inhibitions and emotional distance have led many of her friends to view her as strong-willed and resilient, but Eve does not see herself this way.

Hanna Thompson - Eve's free-spirited, strong-willed and outgoing roommate Hanna is Eve's opposite in many respects, and early story arcs often focused on their Odd Couple-like relationship. Hanna moved in with Eve after Eve's mom found her on "the Craig List" and remembered Hanna as Eve's preschool classmate. Hanna's uninhibited, marijuana-fueled lifestyle is sometimes a source of friction between her and Eve. In contrast to the stereotypical stoner, Hanna is a professional, hard-working small-business owner. Her business, Bake'N'Bake, provides baked goods (which Hanna prepares while high on marijuana, lending the business its name) to a variety of cafes and specialty grocers throughout the city, including Eve's employer, Olly's Organix. She has been in a happy long-term relationship with her live-in boyfriend Marek since the strip began.

Marek Kulasenski - Hanna's warm-hearted, gentle boyfriend Marek is a Polish citizen attending graduate school in the city. He possesses a Zen-like calm and patience, and has almost never been provoked to anger. His relationship with Hanna is stable and happy, and Marek's accommodating nature is often instrumental in keeping the peace between the two. It's been hinted that Marek one day wants to raise a family, which may foreshadow darker times for the couple, as Hanna is adamant in her desire to never have children.

Will LeBlanc - Will is a bartender, marijuana dealer, and general "urban mercenary." Will is charismatic and thoughtful, but his short temper and impulsive nature sometimes lead him to make poor decisions. He was briefly involved in a romantic relationship with Eve, but she ended their relationship when she learned that he was a drug dealer. Will lives with his longtime friend Larry, a sleazy-yet-likeable scam artist. A lengthy relationship with Hanna's friend Marigold ended with a nasty break-up. He is now dating a woman named Aimee, who he began seeing before breaking up with Marigold. It has been hinted that he and Eve still have some feelings for one another.

Marigold Fuchs - Hanna's best friend from college, Marigold is kind, easy-going, naive, and somewhat impressionable. She began as a minor character in Hanna's circle of friends, but has gradually become a central character. During Marigold's relationship with Will, she was in awe of the perceived glamor and excitement of Will's life as a drug dealer until she accompanied him for a day on the job and learned that it was actually fairly mundane. In the aftermath their very rough and painful break-up, Marigold cut off her dreadlocks and reevaluated her life. Although disillusioned with her job, Marigold eventually decided to accept a lucrative promotion at Bed and Bath 3000 and moved into an upscale Manhattan apartment using her new salary.

== Awards ==
Octopus Pie won the 2008 Web Cartoonists' Choice Awards Outstanding Newcomer award and was nominated for Outstanding Black and White Art and Outstanding Website Design. The storyline "Brownout Biscuit" won the 2014 Ignatz Award for "Outstanding Story." In 2016, the comic won the Ignatz Award for "Outstanding Online Comic".

== Collected editions ==
Prior to 2016 multiple editions compiling the comic were published, but starting that year the comic was compiled (including previously published material) in new, definitive editions.

- Octopus Pie Volume 1, February 2016, Image Comics, ISBN 978-1632156327
- Octopus Pie Volume 2, March 2016, Image Comics, ISBN 978-1632156914
- Octopus Pie Volume 3, April 2016, Image Comics, ISBN 978-1632157232
- Octopus Pie Volume 4, May 2016, Image Comics, ISBN 978-1632157553
- Octopus Pie Volume 5, June 2017, Image Comics, ISBN 978-1534301818

Obsolete publications:

- Octopus Pie: A Brooklyn Drama, 2008, collects Introductions through Grocery Misconduct
- Octopus Pie: A Brownstone Companion, July 2008, collects Natural Phenomenon through Our Brooklynian Life
- Octopus Pie: An Interstate Oasis, April 2009, collects Tag through the first part of Interview, but does not include Octopus Pie Love Comics
- Octopus Pie: There are no Stars in Brooklyn, 2010, Villard Books, ISBN 978-0-345-52043-2 - collects first two years of strips, with new title pages for each story
- Octopus Pie: Listen at Home with Octopus Pie, May 2011, collects Exile on Jericho Turnpike through Frontwards
- Octopus Pie: Dead Forever, May 2014, collects Moving On through Simple Breakfast
