= Ignatz Award for Outstanding Artist =

US comics and cartooning award

- Awarded for: Outstanding achievements in comics and cartooning by small press creators or creator-owned projects published by larger publishers
- Location: Bethesda, Maryland
- Country: United States
- Presented by: Ignatz Award Committee
- Hosted by: Small Press Expo
- First award: 1997

Highlights
- Most wins: Jaime Hernández (2x); Rosemary Valero-O'Connell (2x)
- Most nominations: Renée French (4x); Craig Thompson (4x)
- Website: www.smallpressexpo.com/ignatz-awards

The Ignatz Award for Outstanding Artist, established in 1997 as part of the Ignatz Awards, is an annual literary award that recognizes outstanding achievements in comics and cartooning by small press creators or creator-owned projects published by larger publishers. The award for outstanding artist "reflects the best execution of graphic skill by an individual within the comic medium".

== Recipients ==
Award winners and finalists
Year	Author	Work	Publisher	Result	Ref.
1997	Seth	Palookaville	Drawn & Quarterly	Winner	
1997	Gary Panter	Jimbo	Zongo Comics	Finalist	
1997	Gilbert Hernandez	New Love	Fantagraphics Books	Finalist	
1997	Dylan Horrocks	Pickle	Black Eye Productions	Finalist	
1997	C. S. Morse	Soulwind	Image Comics	Finalist	
1998	Dave Sim	Cerebus	Aardvark-Vanaheim	Winner	
1998	Gilbert Hernandez	Luba	Fantagraphics Books	Finalist	
1998	Jaime Hernández	Penny Century	Fantagraphics	Finalist	
1998	Nick Craine	Portrait of a Thousand Punks: Hard Core Logo	House of Anansi Press Ltd.	Finalist	
1998	Joe Chiappetta	Silly Daddy	self-published	Finalist	
1999	Frank Cho	Liberty Meadows #1	Insight Studios Group	Winner	
1999	Eric Shanower	Age of Bronze	Image Comics	Finalist	
1999	Dylan Horrocks	Hicksville	Blackeye	Finalist	
1999	Pat McEown	Kissin' Cousin	Heart Throb #4	Finalist	
1999	Dave Choe	Slow Jams	Non #3 & 4, Red Ink	Finalist	
2000	Dave Cooper	Weasel	Fantagraphics Books	Winner	
2000	Rod Espinoza	The Courageous Princess	Antarctic Press	Finalist	
2000	Craig Thompson	Good-Bye, Chunky Rice	Top Shelf Productions	Finalist	
2000	Francesca Ghermandi	Pastil	Phoenix Enterprise Publishing Co.	Finalist	
2000	Bill Presing	Rex Steele-Nazi Smasher	Monkeysuit Press	Finalist	
2001	2001 Ignatz Awards cancelled after 9-11 Attacks				
2001	Donna Barr	The Desert Peach	A Fine Line Press	Finalist	
2001	Jason Lutes	Berlin	Drawn & Quarterly	Finalist	
2001	Carla Speed McNeil	Finder	Lightspeed Press	Finalist	
2001	Jim Woodring	Frank	Fantagraphics Books	Finalist	
2001	Tony Millionaire	Maakies Sock Monkey	Fantagraphics Books Dark Horse Comics	Finalist	
2002	Megan Kelso	Artichoke Tales #1; Non #5	Highwater Books; Red Ink Press	Winner	
2002	Renée French	The Soap Lady	Top Shelf	Finalist	
2002	Thomas Ott	Greetings From Hellville	Fantagraphics Books	Finalist	
2002	John Kerschbaum	Homecoming, Petey & Pussy	Fontanelle Press	Finalist	
2002	Paul Hornschemeier	Sequential, Forlorn Funnies	I Don't Get It Graphics and Absence Of Ink Press	Finalist	
2003	Jason Little	Shutterbug Follies	Doubleday Graphic Novels	Winner	
2003	Dean Haspiel	Aim to Dazzle	Alternative Comics	Finalist	
2003	Lorenzo Mattotti	Dr. Jekyll & Mr. Hyde	NBM Publishing	Finalist	
2003	Scott Mills	Space Devil	ModernTales.com	Finalist	
2003	Renée French	Rosetta Tinka	Alternative Comics Atheneum	Finalist	
2004	Craig Thompson	Blankets	Top Shelf Productions	Winner	
2004	Joe Sacco	The Fixer	Drawn & Quarterly	Finalist	
2004	Juanjo Guarnido	Blacksad	iBooks	Finalist	
2004	Daniel Clowes	Eightball #23	Fantagraphics Books	Finalist	
2004	Chester Brown	Louis Riel	Drawn & Quarterly	Finalist	
2005	David B	Epileptic; Babel	Pantheon; Drawn & Quarterly	Winner	
2005	Jeffrey Brown	Bighead	Top Shelf Productions	Finalist	
2005	Craig Thompson	Carnet de Voyage	Top Shelf Productions	Finalist	
2005	Seth	Clyde Fans	Drawn & Quarterly	Finalist	
2005	Roger Langridge	Fred the Clown	Fantagraphics	Finalist	
2006	Tony Millionaire	Billy Hazelnuts	Fantagraphics Books	Winner	
2006	Jordan Crane	The Clouds Above	Fantagraphics Books	Finalist	
2006	Renée French	The Ticking	Top Shelf Productions	Finalist	
2006	Chris Ware	Acme Novelty Library #16	Fantagraphics Books	Finalist	
2006	Anders Nilsen	Big Questions #7 and #8	Drawn & Quarterly	Finalist	
2007	Jaime Hernández	Love & Rockets	Fantagraphics Books	Winner	
2007	John Hankiewicz	Asthma	Sparkplug Comic Books	Finalist	
2007	Rutu Modan	Exit Wounds	Drawn & Quarterly	Finalist	
2007	Ted Stearn	Fuzz & Pluck in Splitsville #4	Fantagraphics Books	Finalist	
2007	Vanessa Davis	Papercutter #4 Kramers Ergot #6	Tugboat Press Buenaventura Press	Finalist	
2008	Laura Park	Do Not Disturb My Waking Dream	Self-published	Winner	
2008	Warren Craghead	How to Be Everywhere	Self-published	Finalist	
2008	Michel Rabagliati	Paul Goes Fishing	Drawn & Quarterly	Finalist	
2008	Jillian Tamaki	Skim	Groundwood Books	Finalist	
2008	Lat	Town Boy	First Second Books	Finalist	
2009	Nate Powell	Swallow Me Whole	Top Shelf	Winner	
2009	Richard Sala	Delphine	Fantagraphics/Coconino	Finalist	
2009	Josh Simmons	Mome	Fantagraphics	Finalist	
2009	Carol Tyler	You’ll Never Know, Book One: A Good and Decent Man	Fantagraphics Books	Finalist	
2009	Tim Hensley	Mome Kramers Ergot #7	Fantagraphics Buenaventura Press	Finalist	
2010	Eddie Campbell	Alec: The Years Have Pants (A Life-Sized Omnibus)	Top Shelf Productions	Winner	
2010	Sully	The Hipless Boy	Conundrum Press	Finalist	
2010	Al Columbia	Pim & Francie: The Golden Bear Days	Fantagraphics Books	Finalist	
2010	John Pham	Sublife #2	Fantagraphics Books	Finalist	
2010	Mike Dawson	Troop 142	self-published	Finalist	
2011	Joseph Lambert	I Will Bite You	Secret Acres	Winner	
2011	Edie Fake	Gaylord Phoenix	Secret Acres	Finalist	
2011	Renée French	H-Day	Picturebox	Finalist	
2011	Michael DeForge	Lose #3	Koyama Press	Finalist	
2011	Carol Tyler	You’ll Never Know, Vol 2: Collateral Damage	Fantagraphics Books	Finalist	
2012	Jaime Hernández	Love and Rockets: New Stories	Fantagraphics Books	Winner	
2012	Matthew Thurber	1 800 Mice	Picturebox	Finalist	
2012	Craig Thompson	Habibi	Pantheon	Finalist	
2012	Inés Estrada	Ojitos Borrosos	Self-published	Finalist	
2012	Marc Bell	Pure Pajamas	Drawn & Quarterly	Finalist	
2013	Michael DeForge	Lose #4	Koyama Press	Winner	
2013	Patrick McEown	Hair Shirt	Harry N. Abrams	Finalist	
2013	Lilli Carré	Heads or Tails	Fantagraphics Books	Finalist	
2013	Miriam Katin	Letting It Go	Drawn & Quarterly	Finalist	
2013	Ulli Lust	Today is the Last Day of the Rest of Your Life	Fantagraphics Books	Finalist	
2014	Sam Bosma	Fantasy Basketball		Winner	
2014	Ed Piskor	Hip Hop Family Tree, Vol. 1		Finalist	
2014	Jesse Reklaw	Couch Tag		Finalist	
2014	Kim Deitch	The Amazing, Enlightening and Absolutely True Adventures of Katherine Whaley		Finalist	
2014	Sophie Goldstein	Darwin Carmichael Is Going to Hell; Edna; House of Women		Finalist	
2015	E. M. Carroll	Through The Woods		Winner	
2015	Roman Muradov	(In a Sense) Lost and Found		Finalist	
2015	Noah Van Sciver	Saint Cole		Finalist	
2015	Ed Luce	Wuvable Oaf		Finalist	
2015	Jillian Tamaki	SuperMutant Magic Academy		Finalist	
2016	Tillie Walden	The End of Summer		Winner	
2016	Noah Van Sciver	Disquiet		Finalist	
2016	Daniel Clowes	Patience		Finalist	
2016	Kevin Huizenga	Ganges		Finalist	
2016	Ryan Heshka	Mean Girls Club		Finalist	
2017	Emil Ferris	My Favorite Thing Is Monsters		Winner	
2017	Barbara Yelin	Irmina		Finalist	
2017	Keren Katz	The Academic Hour		Finalist	
2017	Manuele Fior	The Interview		Finalist	
2017	Pablo Auldadell	Paradise Lost		Finalist	
2018	Richie Pope	That Box We Sit On		Winner	
2018	Eddy Atoms	Pinky & Pepper Forever		Finalist	
2018	Sophie Standing	Anxiety is Really Strange		Finalist	
2018	Tommi Parrish	The Lie and How We Told It		Finalist	
2018	Yvan Alagbé	Yellow Negroes and Other Imaginary Creatures		Finalist	
2019	Rosemary Valero-O'Connell	Laura Dean Keeps Breaking Up with Me		Winner	
2019	Ezra Claytan Daniels	Upgrade Soul		Finalist	
2019	Koren Shadmi	Highwayman		Finalist	
2019	Lucy Knisley	Kid Gloves		Finalist	
2019	Sloane Leong	Prism Stalker		Finalist	
2020	Rosemary Valero-O'Connell	Don't Go Without Me		Winner	
2020	Ana Galvañ	Press Enter to Continue		Finalist	
2020	Katie Hicks	Guts		Finalist	
2020	Michael DeForge	Familiar Face		Finalist	
2020	Tianran Qu	Slices of Life: 100 Comic Montage		Finalist	
2021	Lee Lai	Stone Fruit		Winner	
2021	Arantza Peña Popo	Lavender Scare		Finalist	
2021	Ashanti Fortson	Leaf Lace		Finalist	
2021	Damien Roudeau	Crude		Finalist	
2021	Karl Stevens	Penny		Finalist	
2022	Reimena Yee	Alexander, the Servant & the Water of Life	Hiveworks Comics	Winner	
2022	Ron Regé Jr.	Halcyon	Fantagraphics	Finalist	
2022	Brecht Evens	The City of Belgium	Drawn & Quarterly	Finalist	
2022	Jesse Lonergan	Faster	Bulgilhan Press	Finalist	
2022	K Czap	Four Years Collected: Vol 2	Czap Books	Finalist	
2023	Olivia Stephens	Darlin' and Her Other Names	Self-published	Winner	
2023	Noah Van Sciver	Joseph Smith and the Mormons	Abrams Comic Arts	Finalist	
2023	Benjamin Schipper	Joe Death and the Graven Image	Image, Dark Horse Comics	Finalist	
2023	Caroline Cash	PeePee PooPoo #420	Silver Sprocket	Finalist	
2023	Curt Merlo	That Distant Fire	Black Eye Books	Finalist	
2024	Robyn Smith	“Night Fever” from Gladiolus Magazine #1	Black Josei Press	Winner	
2024	Aidan Koch	Spiral and Other Stories	New York Review Comics	Finalist	
2024	Julie Delporte	Portrait of a Body	Drawn & Quarterly	Finalist	
2024	Léa Murawiec	The Great Beyond	Drawn & Quarterly	Finalist	
2024	Nate Garcia	Flippy	Domino Books	Finalist	
2025	Anders Nilsen	Tongues Supplement #1	NoMiracles	Winner	
2025	Deb JJ Lee	Death Fiddles and We Dance	Self-published/Shortbox	Finalist	
2025	Sarah Airriess	The Worst Journey in the World	Iron Circus Comics	Finalist	
2025	Kazimir Lee	Low Orbit	Top Shelf Productions	Finalist	
2025	Lomig	JOHN MUIR: To the Heart of Solitude	NBM Graphic Novels	Finalist	
2026	Carol Tyler	The Ephemerata: Shaping the Exquisite Nature of Grief	Fantagraphics	Winner	
2026	Colin Lidston	Move-In Day	Paper Rocket Minicomics	Finalist	
2026	Ben Passmore	Black Arms To Hold You Up	Pantheon Books	Finalist	
2026	Marshall Smith	Testament	Bulgilhan Press	Finalist	
2026	Rob Woods	Barbecue Block Party	Self-published	Finalist	

== Writers with multiple wins ==
Two creators have won the award twice:

- Jaime Hernández
- Rosemary Valero-O'Connell

== Writers with multiple nominations ==
The following writers have received two or more nominations:

Four

- Renée French
- Craig Thompson

Three

- Michael DeForge
- Carol Tyler
- Noah Van Sciver

Two

- Daniel Clowes
- Gilbert Hernandez
- Jaime Hernández
- Dylan Horrocks
- Tony Millionaire
- Anders Nilsen
- Seth
- Jillian Tamaki
- Rosemary Valero-O'Connell
