= Junc Gallery =

Contemporary art gallery based in Los Angeles

Coordinates: 34.092969°N 118.280515°W

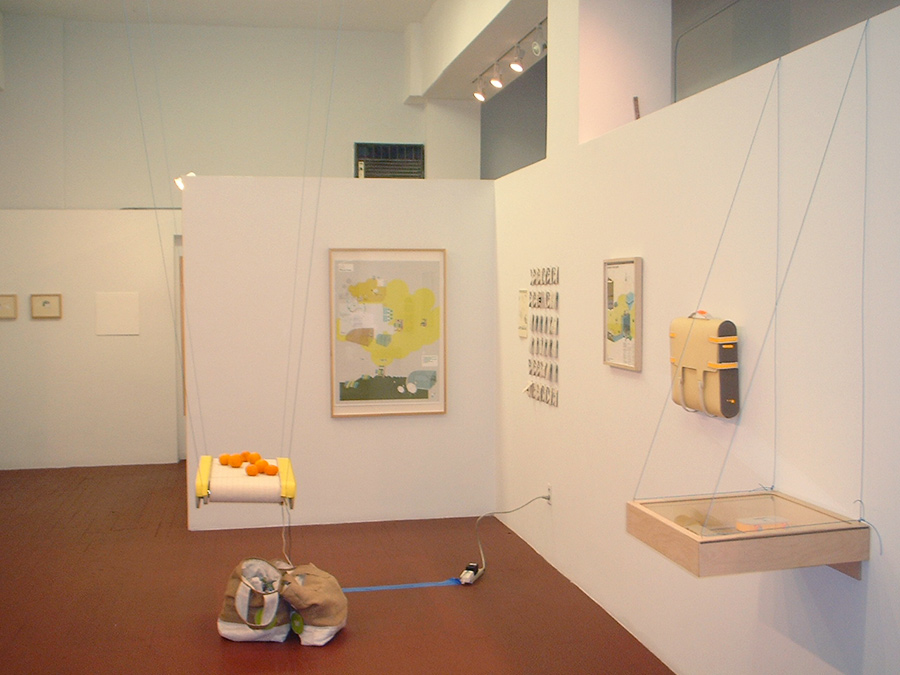

Junc Gallery exhibited contemporary art influenced by illustration and related genres. As such it showed work by artists early in their exhibition history including: Ben Jones (Paper Rad), Eddie Martinez, Futurefarmers, Justin Wood, Brendan Monroe.

Junc Gallery existed from 2004 to 2009 at 4017 Sunset Blvd, (Sunset Junction) in the neighborhood of Los Angeles known as Silver Lake exhibiting an emerging culture of artists influenced by cartoons, illustration, comics, zines and related aesthetics. The rapid emergence of this vernacular into contemporary art galleries during this period has also been called "Post Illustration" by Art Critic Shana Nys Dambrot in a review of the artist Brendan Monroe, an early exhibitor at Junc. Whatever name the art canon ultimately settles on Junc Gallery was an important early adopter of these aesthetic movements in contemporary art.

== Exhibited Artists ==
Tim Biskup, Calef Brown, Jordan Crane, David Goldin, Peter Hamlin, Sammy Harkham, Raina Lee, Anders Nilsen, Misun Oh, Saelee Oh, John Pham, John Porcellino, Ron Rege Jr., Martha Rich, Patrick Roberts, Jonathan Rosen, Bwana Spoons, Mark Todd, Esther Pearl Watson, Megan Whitmarsh, David Miller, Tara Mcphearson, Damon Robinson, Robert Bellum, Rachel Sumpter, Levon Jihanian, Kiyoshi Nakazawa, Saiman Chow, Oksana Badrak, Jeremiah Ketner, Jeana Sohn, Jason Coates, Christa Donner, James Franklin, Matt Haber, Lora Fosberg, Eddie Martinez, Nicole Quaid, Brendan Monroe, Eerik Eullanderson, Guy Meldem, Patrick Roberts, Kyoko Kawasaki, Amanda Visell, Josh Cochran, Martha Rich, Souther Salazar, Dave Miller, Matt Haber, Meredith Dittmar, Marc Bell, Peter Thompson, Paper Rad, Brian Chippendale, C.F., Julie Doucet, Jim Drain, Leif Goldberg, David Sandlin, Frank Santoro, Patrick Smith, Matthew Thurber, Future Farmers Kelly Lynn Jones, Mari Araki, Maxwell Loren Holyoke, Marci Washington, Christopher Silas Neal, Kammy Nasman, APAK, Allison Cole, Genevieve Castree, Kyle Field, Jacob Magraw, Evah Fan, Gary Garay, Jungmin Koh, Albert Reyes, Florencio Zavala, Rachel Sumpter, Luke Ramsey, Patrick Roberts, Jess Hutch, Nathan Gray, Amy Ross, Camilla Engman, Jen Corace, Eric Beltz, Jenny Hart, Nolina Burge, Alika Cooper, Rachel Salomon, Justin Wood, Oksana Badrak, Sean Cassidy, Zachary Rossman, Katy Horan, Sarajo Frieden, Kate Guillen, Brian Rush, Yoon Chung, Jungmin Koh, Sarah Sohn, Josh Cochran, Michele Carlson, Michelle Blade, Brian Rush, Kate Guillen, Drew Beckmeyer, Jesse Dickerson, Rami Kim, Jimenez Lai, Joe Rocco, Erik Sandberg, Jeff Wack, Francis Tsai, Allen A. Richard, Lyndsey Lesh, Alain Massicotte, Emma Brown Trithart, John-Michael Harmon, Matt Heberman, Sarah Hedlund, Steven E Hughes, David Jien, Aya Kakeda, Steph Davidson, Matthew Lock, Sumi Ink Club, Ben Jones, Mike Rea, Ryan Christian, David Magdaleno, Tim Zeiss, Ryan Johnson, Erik Engstrom, Brian Bamps, Dirt, Mustache, John Houlihan, Jeffery Brown

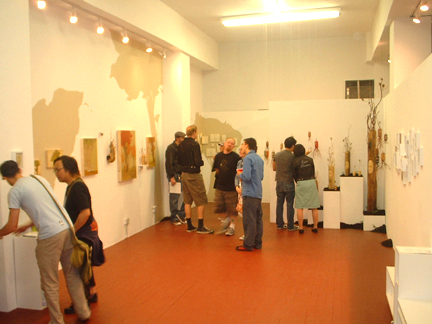
Junc Gallery cica 2006
