= Kramers Ergot =

Series of anthology-style books of comic art

Publication information
- Publisher: (issues #1-3) Avodah Books; (issues #4–5) Gingko Press; (issues #6–7) Buenaventura Press; (issue #8) PictureBox; (issues #9–10) Fantagraphics
- Schedule: Originally annual; then sporadic
- Format: Ongoing series
- Genre: Alternative
- Publication date: Spring 2000–July 2019
- No. of issues: 10
- Editor: Sammy Harkham

Kramers Ergot is a comics anthology edited by American cartoonist Sammy Harkham and featuring contributions from artists such as Dan Clowes, Anders Nilsen, Gabrielle Bell, Kevin Huizenga, Dash Shaw, and Chris Ware among many others.

== Publication history ==
Kramers Ergot started as a minicomic self-published by Sammy Harkham under the imprint Avodah Books. Issues 4 and 5 were published by Gingko Press, while issues 6 and 7 were published by Buenaventura Press.

Published in November 2008, Kramers Ergot 7 features almost 60 artists and is larger (16" by 21") and more expensive ($125) than previous editions.

An eighth volume was released in January 2012 from PictureBox.

A ninth volume was released in April 2016 from Fantagraphics.

A tenth volume was released in July 2019 from Fantagraphics Books.

== Reception ==
A Quimby's blog item promoting multiple touring artists said: "Kramers Ergot has been favorably reviewed and placed on numerous "best of the year" lists, including L.A. Weekly, Dazed & Confused, the Comics Journal, and Publishers Weekly."

== Issues and contributors ==
Issue	Publisher, Date, ISBN	Contributors
1	Avodah Books; Spring 2000; 48 pp.	Includes work by Sammy Harkham, Justin Howe, David Brook, and Luke Quigley.
2	Avodah Books; Spring 2001	Includes work by Sammy Harkham, Justin Howe, David Brook, and Luke Quigley.
3	Avodah Books; December 2002	Includes work by Mark Burrier, Ben Jones, Sara Varon, Stefan Gruber, Kathleen Lolley, Neil Fitzpatrick, Joe Grillo, Hans Rickheit, Zack Soto, Luke Quigley, Mat Tait, and Sammy Harkham.
4	Avodah Books (2003) ISBN 0-9677989-5-7 Reissued by Gingko Press (2004) Reissued by Buenaventura Press (2008) ISBN 0-9800039-7-0	Includes work by Mat Brinkman, Renée French, Anders Nilsen, Leif Goldberg, Lauren Weinstein, Marc Bell, Allison Cole, C.F., Jim Drain, Tobias Schalken, Billy Grant, Andrew Brandou, Josh Simmons, Geneviève Castrée, Joe Grillo, David Heatley, Dave Kiersh, Souther Salazar, Laura Grant, Stefan Gruber, David Lasky, Ben Jones, Jeffrey Brown, Ron Regé, Jr., John Hankiewicz, Jason T. Miles, and Sammy Harkham.
5	Gingko Press; December 31, 2004; ISBN 1-58423-172-6	Includes work by Chris Ware, Dan Zettwoch, Fabio Viscogliosi, Elvis Studio (Helge Ruemann and Xavier Robel), Jordan Crane, Marc Bell, Gabrielle Bell, Gary Panter, Leif Goldberg, Souther Salazar, Sammy Harkham, Neil Burke, Mat Brinkman, David Heatley, Kevin Huizenga, Anders Nilsen, C.F., J. Bradley Johnson, Tom Gauld, Ron Regé, Jr. and Paper Rad
6	Buenaventura Press; July 2006; ISBN 0-9766848-7-X	Includes work by Elvis Studio (Helge Reumann and Xavier Robel), Ron Regé, Jr., Ben Jones, Jerry Moriarty, Tom Gauld, Vanessa Davis, Chris Cilla, Shary Boyle, Suiho Tagawa, Fabio Viscogliosi, C.F., Dan Zettwoch, Marc Smeets, Jason T. Miles, Bald Eagles, Paper Rad, Andrew J. Wright, Gary Panter, Martin Cendreda, Matthew Thurber, James McShane, Marc Bell, Sammy Harkham, Souther Salazar, Jeff Ladouceur and John Porcellino.
7	Buenaventura Press; November 1, 2008; ISBN 0-9800039-5-4	Includes work by Rick Altergott, Gabrielle Bell, Jonathan Bennett, Stéphane Blanquet, Blexbolex, Conrad Botes, Shary Boyle, Mat Brinkman, John Brodowski, Ivan Brunetti, C.F., Chris Cilla, Jacob Ciocci, Dan Clowes, Martin Cendreda, Joe Daly, Kim Deitch, Matt Furie, Tom Gauld, Leif Goldberg, Matt Groening, John Hankiewicz, Sammy Harkham, Eric Haven, David Heatley, Tim Hensley, Jaime Hernandez, Walt Holcombe, Kevin Huizenga, J. Bradley Johnson, Ben Jones, Ben Katchor, Ted May, Geoff McFetridge, Jesse McManus, James McShane, Jerry Moriarty, Anders Nilsen, John Pham, Pshaw, Aapo Rapi, Ron Regé, Jr., Xavier Robel, Helge Reumann, Florent Ruppert et Jérôme Mulot, Johnny Ryan, Richard Sala, Souther Salazar, Frank Santoro, Seth, Shoboshobo, Josh Simmons, Anna Sommer, Will Sweeney, Matthew Thurber, Adrian Tomine, Carol Tyler, Chris Ware, and Dan Zettwoch.
8	PictureBox; January 2012; ISBN 0-9845892-7-9	Includes work by Robert Beatty, Gary Panter, C.F., Kevin Huizenga, Gabrielle Bell, Dash Shaw, Frank Santoro, Tim Hensley, Takeshi Murata, Johnny Ryan, Leon Sadler, Chris Cilla, Anya Davidson, Sammy Harkham, Ron Embleton, and Frederic Mullally with an introduction by Ian Svenonius.
9	Fantagraphics; April 2016; ISBN 1-6069991-2-5	Includes work by Steven Weissman, Noel Freibert, Gabrielle Bell, Michael DeForge, Helge Reumann, Johnny Ryan, Anya Davidson, Al Columbia, Tim Hensley, John Pham, Dash Shaw, Amandine Meyer, Adam Buttrick, Leon Sadler, Gabriel Corbera, Andy Burkholder, Jerry Moriarty, Antony Huchette, Lale Westvind, Kim Deitch, Julia Gfrörer, Baptiste Virot, Trevor Alixopulos, Patrick Kyle, Alex Schubert, Matthew Thurber, Manuele Fior, Stefan Marx, Abraham Diaz, Marc Bell, Andrew Jeffrey Wright, Antoine Cossé, Jonny Negron, Ben Jones, Archer Prewitt, and Renée French.
10	Fantagraphics; July 2019; ISBN 1-6839608-9-0	R. Crumb, Dash Shaw, Lale Westvind, David Collier, Anouk Ricard, C.F., Jason Murphy, Blutch, Shary Flenniken, Johnny Ryan, John Pham, Ron Regé Jr., Simon Hanselmann, Anna Haifisch, Ivan Brunetti, David Amram, Helge Reumann, Frank King, Steve Weissman, Aisha Franz, Leon Sadler, Adam Buttrick, Archer Prewitt, Connor Willumsen, Bendik Kaltenborn, Will Sweeney, Rick Altergott, Kim Deitch, Marc Bell, Sammy Harkham. Cover by Lale Westvind
