= List of Comics Journal interview subjects =

The Comics Journal is an American magazine of news and criticism published by Fantagraphics Books and pertaining to comic books and strips. Of note are its long and in-depth interviews with artists and writers.

== Interview subjects (selection) ==
Subjects are listed with the issue number of the interview(s) in parentheses.

- Nick Abadzis (196)
- Jessica Abel (190, 270)
- Neal Adams (43, 72, 100)
- Lalo Alcaraz (270)
- Doug Allen (156)
- Mike Allred (164, 230)
- Axel Alonso (228)
- Ho Che Anderson (160, 300)
- Brent Anderson (91)
- Man Andersson (174)
- Sergio Aragonés (128)
- Gus Arriola (229)
- Tony Auth (118)
- Brian Azzarello (228)
- David Beauchard (275)
- Gabriel Bá (298)
- Art Babbitt (120)
- Peter Bagge (106, 159, 206, 232)
- John Bagnall (122)
- Kyle Baker (219)
- Clive Barker (171)
- Carl Barks (250)
- Mike Baron (110)
- Donna Barr (190)
- Lynda Barry (132, 296)
- Don Baumgart (92)
- Alison Bechdel (179, 237, 282, 300)
- C. C. Beck (95)
- Steve Bell (272)
- Brian Michael Bendis (266)
- Karen Berger (163)
- Brian Biggs (205)
- Enki Bilal (129)
- Murray Bishoff (27)
- Stephen R. Bissette (93, 137, 185)
- Mark Bodé (270)
- Ruben Bolling (247)
- Murray Boltinoff (53, 100)
- Ariel Bordeaux (188)
- Jim Borgman (300)
- Matt Bors (300)
- Robert Boyd (211)
- Pat Boyette (221)
- Berkeley Breathed (125)
- Raymond Briggs (250)
- Mat Brinkman (256)
- Steve Brodner (262)
- Sims Brothers (160)
- Chester Brown (135, 162)
- Jeffrey Brown (287)
- Ed Brubaker (263)
- Ivan Brunetti (264)
- Frank Brunner (51)
- Rich Buckler (88)
- Bob Burden (268)
- Charles Burns (148, 234, 243)
- John Buscema (226)
- Kurt Busiek (188, 216)
- John Byrne (57, 75)
- Eddie Campbell (145, 273)
- Milton Caniff (108)
- Al Capp (54)
- Joe Casey (257)
- Susan Catherine (122)
- Ben Catmull (259)
- Joey Cavalieri (74)
- Michael Chabon (231)
- Paul Chadwick (132, 221)
- Roz Chast (306)
- Howard Chaykin (51, 91, 99, 109, 300)
- Brian Chippendale (256)
- Frank Cho (205)
- Pierre Christin (129)
- Chris Claremont (50, 74, 78, 89, 100, 152)
- Theo Clarke (122)
- Daniel Clowes (154, 188, 233, 250)
- Erika Clowes (234)
- Chynna Clugston Flores (277)
- Gene Colan (231)
- Joe Coleman (170)
- Katherine Collins (99)
- Max Allan Collins (77, 91)
- Nancy A. Collins (163)
- Ernie Colón (285)
- Steve Conley (232)
- Tony Consiglio (197)
- Gerry Conway (69)
- Darwyn Cooke (285)
- Dave Cooper (245)
- Josh Cotter (299)
- Denys Cowan (91)
- Roy Crane (203, 302)
- Sally Cruikshank (307)
- Maxon Crumb (217)
- Robert Crumb (106, 113, 121, 143, 158, 180, 301)
- Sophie Crumb (274)
- Howard Cruse (111, 182)
- Glenn Dakin (238)
- Lloyd Dangle (223)
- Jeff Danziger (272)
- Dame Darcy (171)
- Jack Davis (153, 225)
- John Davis (188)
- Vincent Davis (98)
- Dan DeCarlo (229)
- Dwight R. Decker (73)
- Tom DeFalco (77)
- Gene Deitch (292)
- Kim Deitch (123, 234, 243, 292)
- Seth Deitch (292)
- Simon Deitch (292)
- Samuel R. Delany (48)
- Oleg Dergatchov (206)
- Tom Devlin (211)
- Mike Diana (173)
- Colleen Doran (188)
- Evan Dorkin (152, 214)
- Julie Doucet (141)
- Debbie Drechsler (249)
- Eric Drooker (253)
- Dupuy and Berberian (260)
- Kevin Eastman (202)
- Dennis Eichhorn (162)
- Will Eisner (46, 47, 89, 91, 100, 249, 267)
- Will Elder (177, 254)
- Harlan Ellison (53, 103, 115)
- Hunt Emerson (198)
- Steve Englehart (63, 100)
- Garth Ennis (207)
- Mark Evanier (58, 112, 113)
- George Evans (177)
- Tristan Farnon (232)
- Jules Feiffer (124)
- Al Feldstein (177, 225)
- Bob Fingerman (207)
- Neil Fitzpatrick (238)
- Mary Fleener (166)
- Michael Fleisher (56)
- Shary Flenniken (95, 146)
- Creig Flessel (245)
- HTML Flowers (305)
- Mike Flynn (88)
- Ellen Forney (237)
- Bob Foster (135)
- Hal Foster (102)
- Matt Fraction (300)
- Rudi Franke (58)
- Frank Frazetta (174)
- Kelly Freas (53)
- Renée French (232, 271)
- Drew Friedman (151)
- Mike Friedrich (71, 100)
- Neil Gaiman (155, 163, 169, 188)
- William Gaines (77, 81, 100)
- Fred Gallagher (277)
- Gabby Gamboa (205)
- Ness Garza (307)
- Clay Geerdes (98)
- Steve Geppi (88)
- Steve Gerber (41, 57, 100)
- Dave Gibbons (116, 300)
- Michael T. Gilbert (84)
- Terry Gilliam (182)
- Peter Gillis (91)
- Juan Giménez (94)
- Dick Giordano (62, 68, 77, 100, 119)
- Gipi (295)
- Jean Giraud (118)
- Phoebe Gloeckner (261)
- Mike Gold (88, 91)
- Larry Gonick (224)
- Archie Goodwin (78, 88, 91, 100)
- Floyd Gottfredson (120)
- Ron Goulart (249)
- Alan Grant (122)
- Paul Gravett (122)
- Grass Green (114)
- Justin Green (104)
- Roberta Gregory (168)
- Mike Grell (91)
- Rick Griffin (257)
- Bill Griffith (157, 234)
- Adam Griffiths (304)
- Bus Griffiths (187)
- Matt Groening (141)
- Gary Groth (58, 73, 74, 88, 99, 105, 115, 163)
- Fred Guardineer (282)
- Emmanuel Guibert (297)
- Jackson Guice (91)
- Nicholas Gurewitch (298)
- Nabile Hage (160)
- Moto Hagio (269)
- David Hajdu (296)
- Larry Hama (91)
- V. T. Hamlin (212)
- Myra Hancock (122)
- Bob Haney (276, 278)
- Simon Hanselmann (304)
- Sammy Harkham (259, 300)
- Jack C. Harris (55)
- Sol Harrison (169)
- R. C. Harvey (290)
- Dean Haspiel (197)
- Seitu Hayden (160)
- Russ Heath (117)
- Jeet Heer (290)
- Sam Henderson (209)
- Hergé (250)
- Gilbert Hernandez (126, 178, 258)
- Jaime Hernandez (126, 178, 300)
- Mario Hernandez (126)
- Al Hirschfeld (201)
- Burne Hogarth (166, 167, 184)
- Nicole Hollander (95)
- Dylan Horrocks (243)
- Jay Hosler (261)
- Kevin Huizenga (259, 300, 305)
- Frank Hussey (258)
- Carmine Infantino (191)
- Will Jacobs (110)
- Al Jaffee (225, 301)
- Jason (294)
- Jaxon (61, 75, 77, 100, 213)
- Dave Johnson (228)
- Kikuo Johnson (277)
- Lynn Johnston (217)
- Bruce Jones (91)
- Gerry Jones (110)
- Ted Jouflas (229)
- Wendy Jung (234)
- Jenette Kahn (37)
- Carol Kalish (77)
- Michael Kaluta (103)
- Jack Kamen (240)
- Gil Kane (38, 64, 75, 91, 99, 105, 113, 186, 187, 226)
- Robert Kanigher (85, 86)
- Kaz (186, 243)
- Walt Kelly (140)
- Megan Kelso (188, 216)
- John Kerschbaum (295)
- Chip Kidd (243)
- Derek Kirk Kim (259)
- Ward Kimball (120)
- Jack Kirby (30, 31, 105, 134)
- Rebecca Kirby (305)
- Roz Kirby (105)
- Robert Kirkman (289)
- Denis Kitchen (63, 88)
- Keith Knight (205, 285, 300)
- James Kochalka (189, 222)
- Aline Kominsky-Crumb (139)
- Carol Kovinick-Hernandez (234)
- David Anthony Kraft (35)
- Paul Krassner (199)
- Joe Kubert (91, 172)
- Peter Kuper (150, 276)
- Paul Kupperberg (91)
- Michael Kupperman (244, 301)
- Harvey Kurtzman (67, 91, 100, 153)
- Gary Kwapisz (58)
- Richard Kyle (98)
- Terry LaBan (163)
- Jackie Lait (114)
- Roger Langridge (284)
- Erik Larsen (222)
- Carol Lay (213)
- Peter Ledger (48)
- Stan Lee (42, 103, 181)
- Steve Leialoha (91)
- David Levine (178, 197)
- Paul Levitz (39)
- Alan Light (27)
- Don Lomax (136)
- M.G. Lord (95)
- Mike Luckovich (296)
- Jason Lutes (228)
- Jay Lynch (114)
- Ralph Macchio (48)
- Matt Madden (290)
- Cathy Malkasian (307)
- Milo Manara (182, 198)
- Joey Manley (277)
- Russ Manning (203)
- Larry Marder (201)
- Rick Marschall (48, 52, 58, 91, 100)
- Mark Martin (170, 232)
- Fifi Martinez (303)
- Joe Matt (162, 183, 293)
- Paul Mavrides (167)
- David Mazzucchelli (152, 194, 300)
- Scott McCloud (137, 179, 188, 197, 232)
- Patrick McDonnell (197)
- Todd McFarlane (152)
- Aaron McGruder (255)
- Richard McGuire (243)
- Dave McKean (155, 196)
- Ted McKeever (163)
- Mike McMahon (122)
- Carla Speed McNeil (280)
- Linda Medley (218)
- Jean-Christophe Menu (277, 300)
- George Metzger (87)
- Jean-Claude Mézières (260)
- Dallas Middaugh (277)
- Mike Mignola (189)
- Frank Miller (68, 70, 77, 78, 89, 101, 118, 209)
- Peter Milligan (206)
- Tony Millionaire (215)
- Junko Mizuno (273)
- Yvonne Mojica (197)
- Sheldon Moldoff (214)
- Fábio Moon (298)
- Alan Moore (93, 106, 116, 118, 138, 139, 140, 143, 152, 231)
- Terry Moore (193, 276)
- Grant Morrison (176, 218)
- Richard Morrissey (73)
- Victor Moscoso (246)
- Françoise Mouly (65)
- Dean Mullaney (88, 115)
- Doug Murray (136)
- Keiji Nakazawa (256)
- Rudy Nebres (48)
- Mark Newgarden (161, 253)
- Ann Nocenti (163)
- Diane Noomin (162)
- Howard Nostrand (96)
- Danica Novgorodoff (300)
- Dennis O'Neil (64, 66, 68, 68, 100, 300)
- Kevin O'Neill (122)
- Rick Obadiah (88)
- Chris Oliveros (188)
- Chris Onstad (277)
- Jerry Ordway (91)
- Gary Panter (100, 250)
- Martin Pasko (37, 58)
- Harvey Pekar (97, 162)
- George Pérez (79, 80, 100)
- John Pham (259)
- Donald Phelps (277)
- Woodrow Phoenix (122)
- Lark Pien (259)
- Wendy and Richard Pini (63, 100, 168)
- Wendy Pini (89, 95, 105)
- Ed Pinsent (122)
- Mike Ploog (267, 274)
- Frank Plowright (122)
- Rachel Pollack (163)
- Paul Pope (191, 192)
- John Porcellino (241)
- Stu Potts (58)
- John Pound (306)
- Byron Preiss (153)
- Frank Quitely (296, 300)
- Thomas Radecki (133)
- Ted Rall (206, 247, 300)
- Brian Ralph (256)
- Jordan Raphael (188, 197, 205, 211)
- Gary Reed (188)
- Ron Regé Jr. (252)
- Pierce Rice (219)
- John Ney Rieber (241)
- Leonard Rifas (92)
- Eduardo Risso (228)
- Trina Robbins (53, 95, 100, 223, 251)
- Alex Robinson (197, 293)
- James Robinson (199)
- Jerry Robinson (271, 272)
- Spain Rodriguez (204, 206, 232, 251)
- Marshall Rogers (54, 91, 100)
- John Romita Sr. (252)
- Budd Root (188)
- Donal Rooum (247)
- Don Rosa (183, 184, 185)
- Avis Rosenberg (95)
- Patrick Rosenkranz (264)
- Alex Ross (223, 224)
- Arnold Roth (142)
- Josef Rubinstein (78)
- Greg Rucka (287)
- Steve Rude (248)
- P. Craig Russell (147)
- Johnny Ryan (279, 296)
- Joe Sacco (176, 234, 301)
- Stan Sakai (192, 300)
- Richard Sala (208)
- Tim Sale (291)
- Zak Sally (300)
- David Sandlin (283)
- Buddy Saunders (116)
- Bill Schorr (193, 194, 195)
- Charles M. Schulz (200)
- Diana Schutz (277)
- Mark Schultz (150)
- Monte Schulz (290)
- Julius Schwartz (68)
- Chris Schweizer (300)
- Maurice Sendak (140, 302)
- Seth (162, 183, 193, 234)
- John Severin (215, 216)
- Marie Severin (237)
- Eric Shanower (265)
- Dash Shaw (296, 300)
- Stan Shaw (160)
- Gilbert Shelton (92, 187)
- Jim Shooter (40, 58, 60, 68, 88, 115)
- Noel Sickles (242)
- Mark Siegel (277)
- Bill Sienkiewicz (91, 107)
- Robert Sikoryak (255)
- Dave Sim (82, 83, 91, 100, 130, 184, 192)
- Deni Sim (82, 83)
- Posy Simmonds (286)
- Josh Simmons (291)
- Julie Simmons (49)
- Joe Simon (134)
- Gail Simone (286)
- Louise Simonson (68, 74)
- Walt Simonson (99)
- Donald Simpson (143)
- Roger Slifer (91)
- Jeff Smith (173, 218)
- Kenneth Smith (48, 100, 105, 210)
- Edward Sorel (158)
- Bill Spicer (98)
- Art Spiegelman (65, 145, 180, 181, 243, 300)
- Tom Spurgeon (188)
- Frank Stack (189, 297)
- John Stanley (250)
- Chris Staros (211, 277)
- Joe Staton (45, 100)
- Ralph Steadman (131)
- Jay Stephens (212)
- Dave Stevens (117)
- Jan Strnad (77, 88)
- Nadine Strossen (188)
- James Sturm (251)
- Tom Sutton (230)
- Curt Swan (73)
- Joost Swarte (181, 279)
- Maria Sweeney (305)
- Bryan Talbot (194)
- Jacques Tardi (302)
- Mark Tatulli (294)
- Roy Thomas (61, 68, 71)
- Craig Thompson (258, 268)
- Jill Thompson (244)
- Kim Thompson (74)
- Frank Thorne (280)
- Stan Timmons (37)
- Seth Tobocman (233, 276)
- Fred Todd (92)
- Tom Toles (195)
- Adrian Tomine (205)
- Tom Tomorrow (165)
- Roy Tompkins (203)
- Mark Tonra (246)
- Alex Toth (98, 262, 277)
- John Totleben (93)
- Lewis Trondheim (283)
- Timothy Truman (144)
- Carol Tyler (142)
- Kazuo Umezu (254)
- Tomi Ungerer (303)
- Brian K. Vaughan (295)
- Rick Veitch (175, 232)
- Charles Vess (91, 218)
- Trevor Von Eeden (91, 298)
- John Wagner (122)
- Martin Wagner (173, 188)
- Matt Wagner (165)
- Mort Walker (116, 297)
- Reed Walker (143)
- Chris Ware (200, 243)
- Marnie Ware (234)
- Brett Warnok (211)
- Andi Watson (248)
- Bill Watterson (127)
- Georgia Webber (305)
- Len Wein (48, 58, 68, 91, 100)
- Drew Weing (259)
- Steven Weissman (205)
- Fredric Wertham (133)
- John Weston (122)
- Shannon Wheeler (204)
- Mack White (203)
- Ted White (59)
- Malcolm Whyte (251)
- Robert Williams (161, 253)
- Al Williamson (90, 100)
- Skip Williamson (104)
- Bill Willingham (278)
- Mary Wilshire (91, 95)
- S. Clay Wilson (251, 293)
- Gahan Wilson (156)
- Barry Windsor-Smith (190)
- Marv Wolfman (44, 58, 79, 80, 91, 100)
- Wally Wood (197)
- Jim Woodring (164)
- Kent Worcester (290)
- John Workman (49, 100)
- Kate Worley (143)
- Bernie Wrightson (76, 100)
- Gene Luen Yang (284)
- Phil Yeh (87)
- Craig Yoe (114)
- Garrett Young (306)
- Minou Zaribaf (237)
- Dan Zettwoch (259)
- Jay Zilber (37)
- Fabio Zimbres (188)
- Aleksandar Zograf (192)
- Ray Zone (102)
- Terry Zwigoff (179)
