= Gabrielle Bell =

British-American alternative cartoonist

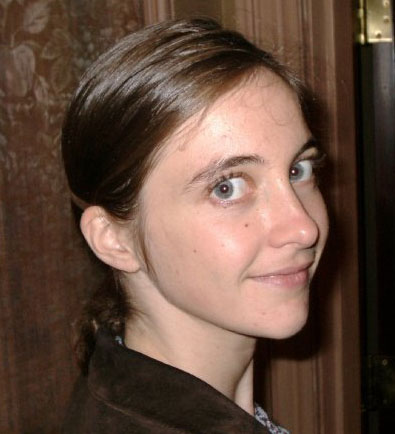
- Bell photographed at the 2004 Small Press Expo (SPX) in Bethesda, Maryland
- Born: Gabrielle Bell; March 24, 1976 (age 50) London, England
- Area: Cartoonist
- Notable works: Lucky; The Voyeurs; July Diary; Everything is Flammable
- Awards: Ignatz Award (2004, 2007)

Gabrielle Bell (born March 24, 1976, in London, England) is a British-American alternative cartoonist known for her surrealist, melancholy semi-autobiographical stories.

As described in The Comics Journal, Bell's "comics persona is that of a barely competent human being ... who stumbles through life, getting into all sorts of awkward and amusing situations.... Even in her own comics, Bell is uncomfortable with being the star, just one of the many contradictions that make her work so interesting."

In addition to her signature comics series Lucky and July Diary, and numerous collections, Bell has been widely anthologized. She was a regular contributor to Fantagraphics' quarterly anthology Mome. She has also contributed to publications such as The New Yorker, McSweeney's, Bookforum, The Believer, Vice, Kramers Ergot (Buenaventura Press), Stereoscomic (Stereoscomic), Bogus Dead (Alternative), Orchid (Sparkplug Comics), The Comics Journal Special Edition 2005 (Fantagraphics), Scheherazade (Soft Skull Press), Linus, and Shout! magazine. Her work has been included in An Anthology of Graphic Fiction, Cartoons, and True Stories (Yale University Press) and four times in the annual The Best American Comics anthology series.

Bell is the recipient of two Ignatz Awards for her work, and has been nominated for numerous other comics industry awards.

== Biography ==
=== Early life and education ===
When Bell was two, her American mother divorced her British father and took Gabrielle and her brother back to the United States. Ending up in a relatively isolated rural town in Mendocino County, Bell writes that she "grew up . . . spending a lot of time reading, walking in the woods, and making up stories." As a teenager, Bell attended a college program for low-income and at-risk students hosted by Humboldt State University, where she took classes in Shakespeare and composition. When Bell was 17 she traveled in Europe, including England, where she met her British relatives. Later moving to San Francisco, Bell took art classes at the City College of San Francisco, worked in a series of retail jobs, and began self-publishing her comics.

=== Career ===
From about 1998 to 2002, Bell annually self-published a 32-page minicomic, each of whose titles began with "Book of...", including Book of Insomnia, Book of Sleep, Book of Black, Book of Lies, and Book of Ordinary Things. Many of the stories from those comics were collected in When I'm Old and Other Stories, published by Alternative Comics in 2003.

In 2003, Bell began the self-published semi-autobiographical Lucky series. In a frank and good-humored manner, Lucky details Bell's day-to-day existence — the anguish of nude modeling; sex-obsessed, adolescent art students; and Bell's own foibles, as her avatar navigates a world of dilapidated rental apartments, low-paying jobs, yoga classes, roommate misadventures, and artistic frustration. These snippets of daily life in the Williamsburg section of Brooklyn, New York, are comforting in their familiarity; by settling into the rhythm of the artist's daily life, the reader experiences the heft of small victories and simple pleasures. The third issue of Lucky won a 2003 Ignatz Award for Outstanding Minicomic.

Lucky was collected by Drawn & Quarterly in fall 2006. Lucky was relaunched by Drawn & Quarterly in 2007 as a new series (vol. 2); the relaunch lasted two issues.

Next, in 2008, was Cecil and Jordan in New York (Drawn & Quarterly), a collection of Bell's short comics work that had been published in various anthologies, including Kramers Ergot (Buenaventura Press), Mome (Fantagraphics), and Drawn & Quarterly Showcase Book Four.

Bell collaborated with French director Michel Gondry on a film adaptation of the title story of Cecil and Jordan in New York, in which a young woman turns herself into a chair so as not to be too much of a bother to those around her. The film, titled Interior Design, was co-written by Bell and Gondry and directed by Gondry as part of the anthology film Tôkyô!.

Bell and Gondry also collaborated on Kuruma Tohrimasu, a collection of drawings and photographs made during the production of Interior Design. Conceived as a thank-you gift for the film's cast and crew, Kuruma Tohrimasu was published as part of Drawn & Quarterly’s Petits Livres series.

Beginning in 2009, Bell entered into a publishing relationship with the new company Uncivilized Books, a relationship that remains to the current day. In 2012, she started her July Diary series, in which she vowed to do a comic every day in the month of July — "31 days, 31 comics." As of 2025, Uncivilized Books had published three volumes of Bell's July Diary series.

The Voyeurs (Uncivilized Books, 2012) is a real-time memoir of a turbulent five years (2007–2011) in Bell's life. It collects episodes from Lucky, in which she travels to Tokyo, Paris, the South of France, and all over the United States, but remains anchored by her home base of Brooklyn, where "sidekick" Tony (the real-life Tony Groutsis) provides ongoing insight, offbeat humor, and enduring friendship.

Bell's first full-length graphic memoir, Everything is Flammable, was released in April 2017. Everything is Flammable was chosen as one of the best graphic novels of 2017 by Entertainment Weekly, was a finalist for the 2017 Los Angeles Times Book Prize for Graphic Novel/Comics, and was nominated for a Broken Frontier Award for Best Graphic Non-Fiction. The book also received praises from acclaimed writers such as Joyce Carol Oates and Tao Lin.

Bell has been a writer/artist in residence at several institutions, including Bryn Mawr College and Baruch College. In 2021, Bell led a five-day workshop on personal stories in comics at CAMP, a residential arts facility in the French Pyrenees.

== Personal life ==
Bell dated French film director Michel Gondry circa 2008, as documented in The Voyeurs. She met Gondry while working as a comics teacher for his son Paul; they were together during the filming of Interior Design. After breaking up with Gondry, she then began dating Ron Regé Jr. (as also documented in The Voyeurs).

As of 2017, Bell lived in Brooklyn.

== Awards ==
- 2004 Ignatz Award for Outstanding Minicomic for Lucky #3
- 2007 Ignatz Award for Outstanding Story for "Felix", in Drawn & Quarterly Showcase Vol. 4

=== Nominations ===
- 2003 Ignatz Award for Outstanding Online Comic for Bell's Home Journal
- 2007:
  - Ignatz Award for Promising New Talent
  - Ignatz Award for Outstanding Anthology or Collection (with Martin Cendrera and Dan Zettwoch) for Drawn & Quarterly Showcase vol. 4
  - Eisner Award for Best Short Story for "Felix", in Drawn & Quarterly Showcase Vol. 4
- 2008 Ignatz Award for Outstanding Comic for Lucky vol. 2, #2
- 2011 Ignatz Award for Outstanding Online Comic for Lucky
- 2012 Ignatz Award for Outstanding Online Comic for Lucky
- 2013 Ignatz Award for Outstanding Online Comic for July Diary
- 2017 (Finalist) Los Angeles Times Book Prize for Graphic Novel/Comics for Everything is Flammable
- 2020:
  - Ignatz Award for Outstanding Story for "Little Red Riding Hood"
  - Ignatz Award for Outstanding Collection for Inappropriate

== Bibliography ==
- Book of... series (self-published):
  - Book of Insomnia (1998)
  - Book of Sleep (1999)
  - Book of Black (2000)
  - Book of Lies (2001)
  - Book of Ordinary Things (2002)
- When I'm Old and Other Stories (Alternative Comics, 2003) ISBN 978-1-891867-43-9
- Lucky vol. 1 (3 issues, self-published, 2003–2004)
- Lucky (Drawn & Quarterly, 2006) ISBN 978-1-897299-01-2
- Lucky vol. 2 (2 issues, Drawn & Quarterly, 2007–2008) — continues stories from Lucky graphic novel
- Cecil and Jordan in New York: Stories by Gabrielle Bell (Drawn & Quarterly, 2008) ISBN 978-1-897299-57-9
- Kuruma Tohrimasu (Drawn & Quarterly, 2008) ISBN 978-1-897299-59-3
- L.A. Diary (Uncivilized Books, 2009)
- Diary: Minneapolis, California, New York, What the, Manifestation (Uncivilized Books, c. 2010)
- July Diary series (Uncivilized Books, 2012– ):
  - July Diary (2012)
  - My Dog Ivy (2019)
  - My Dog Jojo (2021)
- The Voyeurs (Uncivilized Books, 2012) ISBN 978-0-984681-40-2
- Travelogues (Uncivilized Books, 2014)
- Truth is Fragmentary: Travelogues & Diaries (Uncivilized Books, 2014) ISBN 978-0-988901-45-2
- Get Out Your Hankies (Uncivilized Books, 2016)
- Everything is Flammable (Uncivilized Books, April 2017) ISBN 978-1941250181
- Inappropriate (Uncivilized Books, 2020) ISBN 978-1941250389
- Career Shoplifter (Uncivilized Books, 2022)
