= Joe Grillo =

American Artist

Joe Grillo (b. 1980 Meteor City, AZ) is an American visual artist based in Virginia Beach, VA. He was briefly a member of the artist collective Paper Rad, before splintering off to found the artist collective Dearraindrop with siblings Laura Grant and Billy Grant in 2003. His graphic work was first published in the quarterly underground comics newspaper Paper Rodeo from 2002-2005, as well as in comic anthologies Kramers Ergot and Alive Outside. He has exhibited internationally as a solo artist at Nordiska Akvarellmuseet Museum in Skarhamn, Loyal Gallery in Sweden, and The Hole in New York City.

His artwork has been described by Roberta Smith of The New York Times as "raucous, densely composed works... crowded with apparent pop-culture figures and motifs that are nearly all invented. Rendered in saturated colors outlined in black, they operate in an area bounded by painting, cartooning, graffiti and perhaps video games... a crazed retinal overload tends to distinguish Mr. Grillo’s works from those of his predecessors."

Music has been an important influence on Grillo, and references to rock bands can be found throughout his work. His art has been featured on Bill Callahan's Woke on a Whaleheart and Awesome Color's self titled debut. His record designs for Dearraindrop's Asid Rain and Flaspar's Quadrupletrouble were featured in Taschen's Art Record Covers Book in 2017 alongside record designs by Andy Warhol, Jean-Michel Basquiat, and Damien Hirst.

== Selected work ==
=== Music ===
- Dearraindrop: Asid Rain (2005)
- Dearraindrop: (Spinning Silver) Sarcophagus (2006)

=== Books ===
- Kramers Ergot 3 (Avodah Books, 2002)
- Kramers Ergot 4 (Avodah Books, 2003)
- Joe Grillo: #%@&?!!! (The Hole, 2015)
- Joe Grillo: Acid American (Cellar Contemporary, 2016)
- Joe Grillo: Miles of Slime and Smiles (Neoglyphic Media, 2023)
- ALIVE OUTSIDE (Neoglyphic Media, 2024)
