= David Heatley =

American cartoonist, illustrator, graphic designer, and musician

- Born: October 17, 1974 (age 52) Teaneck, New Jersey, U.S.
- Areas: Cartoonist, Musician
- Notable works: My Brain is Hanging Upside Down; Qualification

David Heatley (born October 17, 1974) is an American cartoonist, illustrator, graphic designer, and musician.

== Biography ==
=== Education ===
Born in Teaneck, New Jersey, Heatley graduated from Teaneck High School in 1993. He graduated from the San Francisco Art Institute in 2000.

=== Comics ===
Though he studied painting and filmmaking at Oberlin College, Heatley started drawing comics regularly in the late 1990s. Since then, his comics and illustrations have appeared on the cover of The New Yorker, in The New York Times, McSweeney’s, Mome, and Kramers Ergot, among others. He has been featured three times in The Best American Comics series. Fantagraphics published two issues of his solo comic book series, Deadpan, which mostly featured Heatley's "dream comics", exploring his often sexual- and violence-tinged dreams in a straightforward, guileless style.

In September 2008, Pantheon Books released Heatley's first full-length book, My Brain is Hanging Upside Down. (Some of the material had originally appeared in such places as Deadpan, Mome, McSweeney's #13, The Best American Comics 2006, The Best American Comics 2007, and Kramers Ergot #5.) A graphic memoir, My Brain is Hanging Upside Down employs an unfiltered candor that borders on the confessional, presenting Heatley's life story through six interconnected narrative threads: "Sex History," (every sexual encounter of his life, beginning as early as kindergarten), "Black History" (a brutally honest reflection on Heatley's own experiences with racism, confronting uncomfortable truths), "Portrait of My Mom" and "Portrait of My Dad" (comic strip-style vignettes that both critique and celebrate his endearingly dysfunctional parents), and "Family History" (tracing his family's lineage from the lives of his great-great-grandparents through to the birth of his own children). Interwoven throughout these narratives are Heatley's "dream comics," which explore similar themes through surreal, unconscious logic. In his review for The New York Times, critic Douglas Wolk wrote of the book that it "seems to encompass every uncomfortable thought he's ever had about sexuality, race and his family."

In 2019, Pantheon released Heatley's second graphic memoir, Qualification: A Graphic Memoir in Twelve Steps, an exploration of his experiences with twelve-step programs like Alcoholics Anonymous, Overeaters Anonymous, Debtors Anonymous, Sex and Love Addicts Anonymous, and more. Reader's Digest cited Qualification in its 2024 round-up of the 50 Best Graphic Novels for Adults.

Also in 2019, Heatley self-published (in partnership with the Brooklyn retailer Desert Island) Amy, a 190-page graphic memoir that explores his intense, unrequited love for a teenage friend, and the profound, lasting effects it had on his life. (Some of Amy had been serialized by Heatley on Instagram.) The limited-edition, digest-size work was printed in blue on a risograph.

=== Music ===
Heatley's high school band Velvet Cactus Society released two albums on Shimmy Disc in the early 1990s. In 2008, he recorded (under his own name) a soundtrack to his graphic novel My Brain is Hanging Upside Down, featuring a cover of The Ramones song by the same name. The soundtrack was released on WonderSound records.

=== Personal life ===
Heatley lives in Jackson Heights, New York, with his wife Rebecca Gopoian (an agnostic, Jewish-Armenian poet) and their two children, Maya and Samuel Heatley.

== Inspiration ==
Heatley lists among his influences Daniel Clowes, Gary Panter, Fort Thunder, and Paper Rad.

== Selected works ==
=== Books ===
- My Brain is Hanging Upside Down (Pantheon Books, September, 2008) ISBN 0-375-42539-X
- (with writer Ellen Potter) Otis Dooda (Feiwel & Friends, 2013)
- (with writer Ellen Potter) Otis Dooda: Downright Dangerous (Feiwel & Friends, 2014)
- Qualification: A Graphic Memoir in Twelve Steps (Pantheon, 2019) ISBN 978-0375425400
- Amy (co-published with Brooklyn's Desert Island, 2019)

=== Solo Comics ===
- Deadpan #1 (Fantagraphics)
- Deadpan #2 (Fantagraphics)

=== Collaborative Comics ===
- My Home Birth by Christen Clifford

=== Anthology appearances ===
Publication	Publisher, Date, ISBN	Contribution
Kramers Ergot 4	Gingko Press; ISBN 0-9677989-5-7; ISBN 0-9800039-7-0	
Timothy McSweeney's Quarterly Concern; Issue 13	McSweeney's; May 14, 2004; ISBN 1-932416-08-0	Original printing of "Portrait of My Dad"; a strip on the table of contents page.
Kramers Ergot 5	Gingko Press; December 31, 2004; ISBN 1-58423-172-6	15-page story: "My Sexual History"
Bête Noire #1	Fantagraphics; 2004	cover art
The Education Of A Comics Artist	Allworth Press; May 1, 2005; ISBN 1-58115-408-9	2-page strip called "How I Became the Cartoonist I am today."
Mome Vol. 1 - Summer 2005	Fantagraphics Books; September 12, 2005; ISBN 1-56097-650-0	Part 1 of serial comic "Overpeck"
Mome Vol. 2 - Fall 2005	Fantagraphics; November 30, 2005; ISBN 1-56097-684-5	Part 2 of serial comic "Overpeck"
Mome Vol. 3 - Winter 2006	Fantagraphics; April 24, 2006; ISBN 1-56097-697-7	Part 3 of serial comic "Overpeck"
Mome Vol. 4 - Spring/Summer 2006	Fantagraphics; July 31, 2006; ISBN 1-56097-726-4	dream comics
The Best American Comics 2006	Best American; October 11, 2006; ISBN 0-618-71874-5	"Portrait of My Dad"
Mome Vol. 6 - Winter 2007	Fantagraphics; January 16, 2007; ISBN 1-56097-781-7	dream comics
Mome Vol. 7 - Spring 2007	Fantagraphics; May 22, 2007; ISBN 1-56097-834-1	dream comics
The Best American Comics 2007	Best American; October 10, 2007; ISBN 0-618-71876-1	cover art; 10 pages of dream comics
The Best American Comics 2008	Best American; October 8, 2008; ISBN 0-618-98976-5	
An Anthology of Graphic Fiction, Cartoons, and True Stories: Volume 2	Yale University Press; October 21, 2008; ISBN 0-300-12671-9	
Kramers Ergot 7	Buenaventura Press; November 1, 2008; ISBN 0-9800039-5-4	
