= PictureBox =

American entertainment company

- Status: Defunct (2013)
- Founded: 2002
- Founder: Dan Nadel
- Country of origin: United States
- Headquarters location: Brooklyn, New York
- Publication types: Books
- Official website: www.pictureboxinc.com

PictureBox was an art, music, photography, and comics publishing company based in Brooklyn, New York directed by Dan Nadel. PictureBox published its own books and packages books and concepts for museums and galleries. The company began in 2002 with The Ganzfeld 2 and gradually shifted to emphasize a diverse assortment of visual ideas and topics. PictureBox was best known for its books by artists from or related to the Providence art scene of the 2000s, music books, and projects for numerous artists involved with the New York gallery Canada. The cover art for Wilco's A Ghost Is Born, designed by Peter Buchanan-Smith and Nadel, won a Grammy Award for Best Recording Package in 2005.

In December 2013, Nadel announced PictureBox would cease publishing at the end of the year. Since then, Nadel has curated exhibitions and edited books including What Nerve!: Alternative Figures in American Art, 1960 to the Present, Takeshi Murata, Jimmy De Sana's Suburban, and The Collected Hairy Who Publications. He also co-curated, with Carroll Dunham, an exhibition of drawings by Elizabeth Murray.

== Publications ==
1-800 MICE Issue 1 by Matthew Thurber
1-800 MICE Issue 2 by Matthew Thurber
Art Out Of Time: Unknown Visionary Cartoonists, 1900-1969 by Dan Nadel
Bicycle Fluids by Matthew Thurber
Blockhead Blues by Eddie Martinez
Cartoon Workshop / Pig Tales by Paper Rad
Cheap Laffs: The Art of the Novelty Item by Mark Newgarden
Chimera by Frank Santoro
Cold Heat by BJ and Frank Santoro
Cold Heat 1-4 by BJ and Frank Santoro
Cold Heat Special by Jon Vermilyea and Frank Santoro
Cold Heat Special 3 by Dash Shaw and Frank Santoro
Cold Heat Special 4 by Jim Rugg and Frank Santoro
Cold Heat: Castle Castle by Frank Santoro
Color Engineering by Yuichi Yokoyama
Comics Comics 1-3 by Tim Hodler and Dan Nadel, editors
Core of Caligula by C.F.
Crazy Town by Paul Gondry
Eddie Martinez/Chuck Webster by Eddie Martinez & Chuck Webster
Elle-Humour by Julie Doucet
Faded Igloo by Jim Drain
For the Love of Vinyl: The Album Art of Hipgnosis by Storm Thorgerson and Aubrey Powell
Free Radicals by Leif Goldberg
Garden by Yuichi Yokoyama
Gary Panter by Gary Panter
Goddess of War Vol. 1 by Lauren Weinstein
Good Life by Taylor McKimens
Gore by Black Dice and Jason Frank Rothenberg
H Day by Renée French
Incanto by Frank Santoro
If-n-Oof by Brian Chippendale
Maggots by Brian Chippendale
Mail Order Monsters by Kathy Grayson
Me a Mound by Trenton Doyle Hancock
Monster Men Bureiko Lullaby by Takashi Nemoto
Multiforce by Mat Brinkman
New Engineering by Yuichi Yokoyama
Ninja by Brian Chippendale
Nog a Dod by Marc Bell
Overspray: Riding High With the Kings of California Airbrush Art by Norman Hathaway and Dan Nadel
Paper Rad, B.J. and da Dogs by Paper Rad
Powr Mastrs by C.F.
Powr Mastrs vol. 2 by C.F.
Powr Mastrs vol. 3 by C.F.
Real Fun by Ashod Simonian
SnooPee by Ken Kagami
Some Kinda Vocation by Cheryl Dunn
Storeyville by Frank Santoro
The Drips by Taylor McKimens
The Ganzfeld 1-5 by Dan Nadel, ed.
The Garden by Michael Williams
The Magnificent Excess of Snoop Dogg by Katherine Bernhardt
The Trenton Doyle Handbook by Trenton Doyle Hancock
The Wilco Book by Wilco and PictureBox
Travel by Yuichi Yokoyama
Tuff Stuff by Joe Bradley
Utility Sketchbook by Anonymous
We Lost the War but Not the Battle by Michel Gondry
Wipe That Clock Off Your Face by Brian Belott
World Map Room by Yuichi Yokoyama
Wu Tang Comics by Paper Rad
