= V1 Gallery =

Contemporary art gallery in Copenhagen

Coordinates: 55.6676°N 12.5613°E

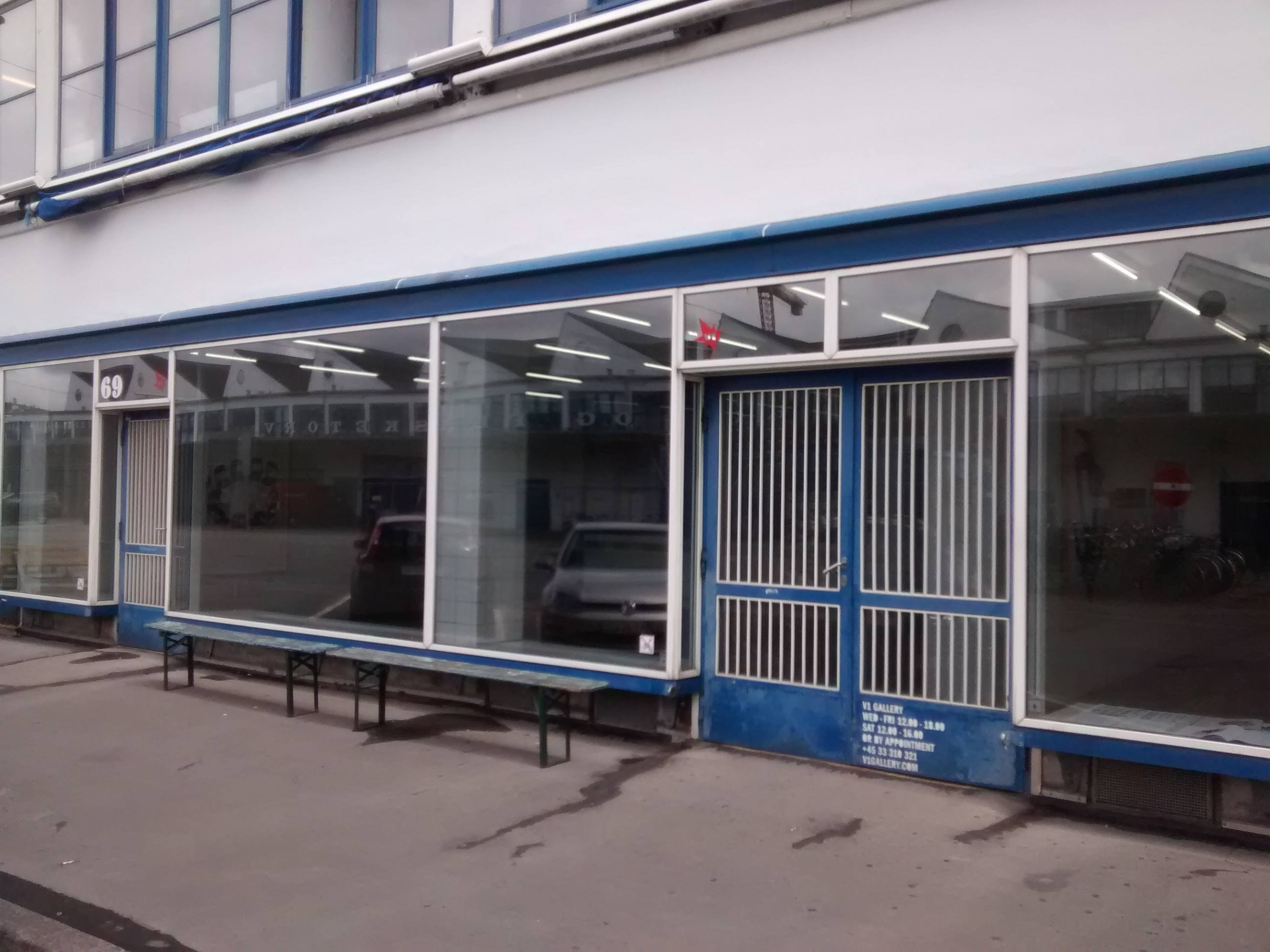
V1 Gallery

V1 Gallery is a contemporary art gallery located in the Meatpacking District of Copenhagen, Denmark. It was founded in 2002 by designer Jesper Elg and photographer Peter Funch. V1 Gallery gained international notability by being the first art gallery in Scandinavia to exhibit international street art pioneers such as Banksy (UK) and Eine (UK), the Faile artist collective (US/JAP), Futura 2000 (US), Zevs (FR) and OBEY / Shepard Fairey (US). The gallery has been listed as "Copenhagen's coolest art gallery" by The New York Times, and listed in ArtNet's "Best contemporary galleries in Europe".

The gallery's best known projects include:

- The Boredom Project by Faile in 2002
- Banksy VS EINE by Banksy and EINE in 2003
- The Hunt For Your Family featuring artists such as Devendra Banhart, Adam Green (musician), and Chris Johanson curated by Galleri Loyal in 2004
- OBEY by Shepard Fairey in 2004
- Futura - Year In Pictures by Futura 2000 in 2005
- Random Happenings with Dash Snow in 2005
- Coup de Theatre by Jakob Boeskov in 2005
- MuhameDansk by HuskMitNavn in 2006
- Highmath curated by Arkitip in 2006
- V-B by Dearraindrop in 2006
- Super Fortress by Richard Colman in 2006
- Rehearsal For Death by Neck Face in 2007
- Trouble by Todd REAS James in 2007
- Babel Tales by Peter Funch in 2007
