= Tim Hensley =

American cartoonist

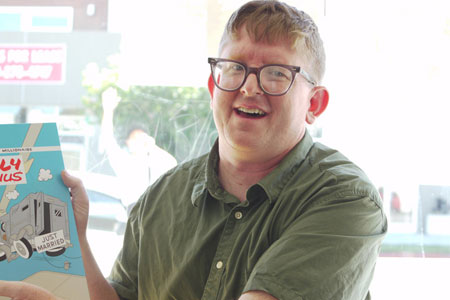
- Photo by Graham Kolbeins
- Born: Tim Hensley; August 24, 1966 (age 60) Bloomington, Indiana
- Area: Cartoonist
- Notable works: Wally Gropius (2010); Sir Alfred No. 3 (2016); Detention No. 2 (2022)

Tim Hensley (born August 17, 1966, in Bloomington, Indiana) is an American alternative cartoonist. Hensley's most notable works are Wally Gropius published by Fantagraphics Books in 2010 and Sir Alfred No. 3 published by Pigeon Press in 2016. Hensley has been published in numerous anthologies, such as Smoke Signal, Dirty Stories, The Believer, Comic Art, Duplex Planet Illustrated, and special editions of The Comics Journal.

== Career ==
Hensley's parents moved to Los Angeles, where Hensley still lives, at the age of three. Hensley's father, was an avid comics reader, reading Marvel, DC, Warren magazines, underground comix, and Heavy Metal Magazine. In 1989 Hensley discovered alternative comics and a few years later started to focus on becoming a cartoonist.

In 1989 Hensley mailed Daniel Clowes after noticing his mailing address in the back of an old Lloyd Llewellyn issue he was reading. Hensley asked Clowes if he would be interested in doing the cover art to an album he was working on for his band, Victor Banana. Clowes did the cover art and then asked Hensley if he would be interested in creating a soundtrack to one of the stories in his upcoming one-man anthology Eightball. The story was Like a Velvet Glove Cast in Iron. The album was released in 1993.

Hensley's father, Tom Hensley, is a keyboardist and songwriter for Neil Diamond.

== Publications ==
- Ticket Stub minicomics (2000-2006) — After college, while working as a closed-captioning editor, Hensley would jot down the time code of any frames he found of interest in the video he was working on. After he had transcribed the video and if he had spare time, he'd create drawings based on these frames. Some of these drawings Hensley published as minicomics titled, Ticket Stub. The minicomics ran for 9 issues. In 2012, Yam Press published the collection as a book with the same title, Ticket Stub.
- Wally Gropius (Fantagraphics, 2010) — Wally Gropius is the main character in the book and resembles a teenaged Richie Rich or a classmate of Archie Andrews at Riverdale High. The book itself resembles a 1960s teenage humor comic but it is a satire. Hensley named the book after the architect, Walter Gropius, because he thought the name sounded humorous. In 2014 Tim Hodler, editor of The Comics Journal, wrote "Wally Gropius ...is on a shortlist of essential graphic novels of this millennium."

Left: From the cover of Tubby #5 (1953). Right: Hensley’s Hitchcock. Hensley invokes the Little Lulu style associated with John Stanley and Irving Tripp.

Hensley modeled the cover for Sir Alfred No. 3 on a cover by DC Comics The Adventures of Bob Hope #6 (1950).

- Sir Alfred No. 3 (Pigeon Press, 2016) — In Sir Alfred No. 3, Hensley turns the life of the film director Alfred Hitchcock into 65 comic strips, most of which employ the look of Little Lulu comic books. Ken Parille of The Comics Journal calls the book an "oblique biography", where some of Hensley's strips play it straight while with others he chooses to expand, compress, or combine incidents which amplify the comedy and perversion of the director's life. Hensley ignores chronology, omits milestones in the subject's life, and even draws moments when young and old versions of the protagonist meet. Hensley hand-lettered the oversized comic. He collaborated with Alvin Buenaventura and the comic was published by Buenaventura's Pigeon Press. Buenaventura carefully oversaw every aspect of its manufacture and printing. One thousand copies were signed, numbered and included a giclée print of a scene from the filming of Psycho as well as a letterpress coaster. It was packaged in a custom-made Mylar sleeve. Issues #1 and #2 of Sir Alfred do not exist. On November 16, 2022, Fantagraphics Books released a reprint of Sir Alfred No. 3.
- Detention No. 2 (Fantagraphics Books, 2022) — In Detention No. 2, Hensley's main focus is a cerebral adaptation of the short novel Maggie: A Girl of the Street by the American writer Stephen Crane which Hensley filters through a lens of a vintage Classics Illustrated comic book. Joe McCulloch of The Comics Journal writes, "The total effect is very different from the funny-but-cerebral Sir Alfred or the surreally distended John Stanley gag licks of his earlier Wally Gropius (2010); all of Hensley's comics are enjoyable, but this is the one that most directly captures the surface pleasures of the subject of its pastiche—telling an old story in a succinct and pleasurable cartooned manner—and can most be enjoyed 'on the merits' of its homage.". Detention No. 1 does not exist.
