= Mothers News =

Newspaper

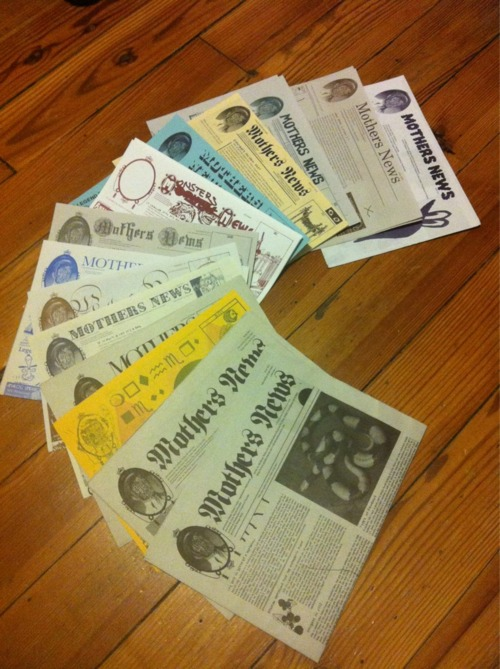
- Type: Alternative newspaper
- Format: Tabloid
- Owner(s): Rhododenron Festival, Inc.
- Publisher: Rhododenron Festival, Inc.
- Editor: Jacob Khepler
- Founded: 2010
- Ceased publication: 2015
- Headquarters: Providence, RI; United States
- Website: MothersNews.net

Mothers News was a free monthly newspaper published in Providence, RI by Rhododendron Festival. It existed between 2010 and 2015.

== Background ==
Mothers News had a circulation of 5,000 copies per month, including national and international subscribers who receive issues by mail. The first issue was published in May 2010. Initially in 2 page broadsheet format, it expanded in 2011 to 8 pages (or occasionally 12).

The paper was owned and published by Rhododendron Festival, Inc. and edited by Jacob Khepler (née Berendes). It was distributed locally in Providence and nationally at independent bookstores, boutiques, and venues.

Mothers News won the 2011 New England Art Award, in the 'book' category.

The College Hill Independent covered the publication of the 30th issue of Mothers News in November, 2012, interviewing editor Jacob Khepler. In the interview, Khepler commented on his hope for the newspaper, saying, "I want the newspaper to be a bit of a beacon for 'I'm just doing my thing and it's working. I trust myself. And my eyes are open to possibility, to failure, to change. And you could do the same thing.'"

Space1026 Gallery in Philadelphia, PA held a Mothers News art show in September 2012, showcasing work from the paper.

Mothers News was an official exhibitor at the 2011 Brooklyn Comics and Graphics Festival, a featured speaker and exhibitor at the 2013 Baltimore Publications and Multiples Fair, and a special guest at the Rhode Island Independent Publishing Expo

== Content ==
Mothers News included articles on philosophy, religion, arts, culture, music, and more. The paper includes a street fashion column and a comic section, featuring monthly comics from several notable comic artists, including Brian Chippendale, Christopher Forgues, Michael Deforge, Charles Forsman and others.

Back issues of the first three years of Mothers News are viewable online.

== In other media ==
An issue of Mothers News was visible on a table in the November 11, 2011 episode of Roger Ebert's PBS television show Ebert Presents: At the Movies (see screenshot or video).

Comic strips from Mothers News appeared in the exhibition "Comics" by CF, at Beginnings—Gallery in New York City NY.

In a 2012 photo of fashion journalist Tavi Gevinson's bedroom, a September issue of Mothers News featuring a "fashion news" section appears among other prints and jewelry.
