= Comic Art =

American magazine (2002–2007)

- Cover by Ernesto Cabral, Comic Art #4, 2003
- Editor: Todd Hignite
- Assistant Editor: Sara Rowe Hignite
- Design & Production: Daniel Zimmer (#1 - #7), Jonathan Bennett (#8 & #9)
- Categories: art magazines
- Publisher: M. Todd Hignite & Daniel Zimmer (#1 - #7), Buenaventura Press (#8 & #9)
- Country: United States
- Based in: St. Louis, Missouri
- Language: English
- ISSN: 1542-7447

Comic Art was a magazine, founded and edited by Todd Hignite, which surveyed newspaper comic strips, magazine cartoon panels and comic book art, both historical and contemporary.

== History and profile ==
Comic Art was established in 2002. The first seven issues featured articles on Art Spiegelman, Daniel Clowes, Harvey Kurtzman, Crockett Johnson and Frank King. According to critic Tom Spurgeon, "Comic Art is a comics publication that... has chosen to investigate the good and interesting no matter when it's been done." Daniel Zimmer was the publication's graphic design and art director for the first seven issues. The eighth and ninth issues were expanded considerably and published annually in book form by Buenaventura Press. Alvin Buenaventura assisted Hignite with editing these two issues, and they were designed and art directed by Jonathan Bennett.

It is not connected with the original fanzine Comic Art, which was published (beginning in 1960) by Maggie and Don Thompson.

== Publications ==
- Comic Art #1, 2002, 80p., M. Todd Hignite & Daniel Zimmer (St. Louis, MO)
- Comic Art #2, 2003, 80p., M. Todd Hignite & Daniel Zimmer (St. Louis, MO)
- Comic Art #3, 2003, 80p., M. Todd Hignite & Daniel Zimmer (St. Louis, MO)
- Comic Art #4, 2003, 80p., M. Todd Hignite & Daniel Zimmer (St. Louis, MO)
- Comic Art #5, 2004, 80p., M. Todd Hignite & Daniel Zimmer (St. Louis, MO)
- Comic Art #6, 2004, 80p., M. Todd Hignite & Daniel Zimmer (St. Louis, MO)
- Comic Art #7, 2005, 80p., M. Todd Hignite & Daniel Zimmer (St. Louis, MO)
- Comic Art #8, 2006, 176p., Buenaventura Press (Oakland, CA)
- Comic Art #9, 2007, 208p., ISBN 9780976684862, Buenaventura Press (Oakland, CA)

== Awards ==
In 2003 the magazine was nominated for both the Eisner Awards and Harvey Awards, and won the 2004 Harvey Award for Best Historical, Biographical, or Journalistic Presentation.

In 2006, Yale University Press published a collection of Hignite's "In The Studio" columns in an expanded 320-page hardback, In the Studio: Visits with Contemporary Cartoonists, ISBN 0-300-11016-2.

== See also ==
- Allan Holtz
- Billy Ireland Cartoon Library & Museum
- The Comics Journal
- Dave Strickler
- Graphic Story Magazine
- Hogan's Alley
- Nemo, the Classic Comics Library
- Sequart Organization
