= Vanessa Davis (cartoonist) =

American cartoonist

- Born: October 14, 1978 (age 48); West Palm Beach, Florida, U.S.
- Occupations: Cartoonist; author; humorist
- Known for: Spaniel Rage (2005); Make Me a Woman (2010)

Vanessa Davis is an American illustrator, humorist, and cartoonist of alternative comic books.

She is best known for the autobiographical graphic novel Make Me A Woman and minicomic Spaniel Rage, published by Drawn & Quarterly. Her comics have appeared in several anthologies, including Kramers Ergot, The Best American Comics, Stuck in the Middle, Papercutter, and An Anthology of Graphic Fiction, Cartoons and True Stories. She earned a fine arts degree from the University of Florida.

Davis' comics and illustrations are usually rendered in highly chromatic watercolors or in pencil. The stories they tell are taken from her diary and are candidly personal, witty and self-deprecating; centering on her youth, mother, relationships with men, and Jewish identity. Her work has appeared in The New York Times, Dissent, and The Forward, and she is a regular contributor to Tablet Magazine. In 2009, she was awarded the Maisie Kukoc Award for Comics Inspiration, and in 2017 the Terry Southern Prize for Humor for her eight-part series, Summer Hours, published in the Paris Review.

== Bibliography ==
- Summer Hours (self-published, 2016)
- Make Me a Woman (Drawn & Quarterly, 2010)
- Kitchen Conniption (self-published, 2010)
- Spaniel Rage (Buenaventura Press, 2005)
  - reissued (Drawn & Quarterly, 2017)
