= Christopher Forgues =

American novelist

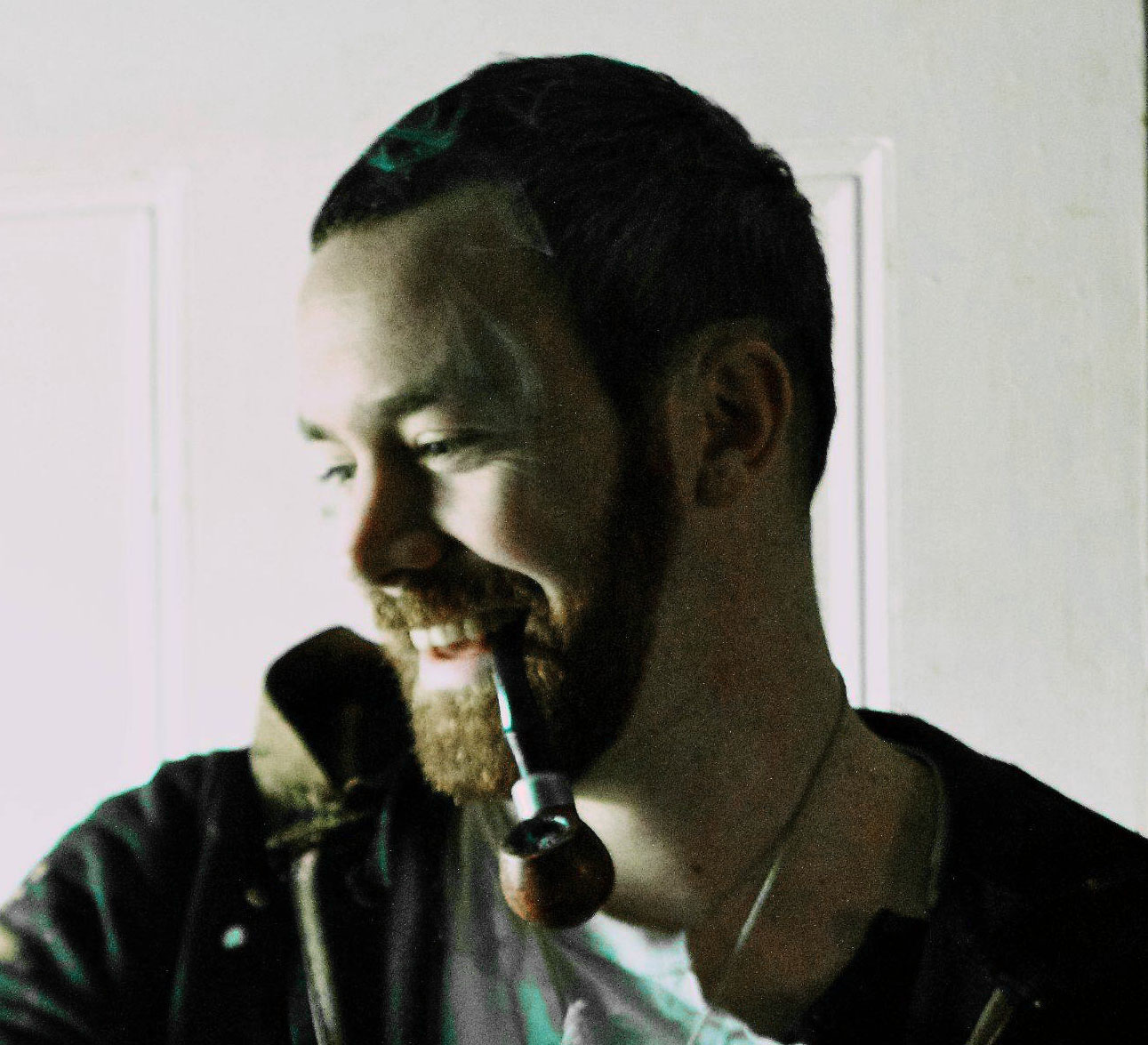
- Born: 1979 (age 46–47); Massachusetts, U.S.
- Other names: C.F., Chris Forgues
- Education: Massachusetts College of Art and Design
- Known for: Cartoons, Graphic Novels, Music

Christopher "Chris" Forgues, (also known professionally as C.F. and Kites), is an artist and musician, best known for his graphic novel serial Powr Mastrs. He is based in Providence, Rhode Island.

== About ==
He holds a B.F.A. from the Massachusetts College of Art and Design. C.F. was influenced in the 2000s by the Fort Thunder art collective in Providence, Rhode Island and did some worked with them. C.F. collaborated with Ben Jones on a zine project called "Paper Radio". Art in America magazine named Forgues one of the, "most important cartoonists of their generation" for his work with Paper Radio.

His graphic novel series, Powr Mastrs, is published by Picturebox. His story "Mosfet Warlock and the Mechlin Men" was included in The Best American Comics 2009, edited by Charles Burns. His work has also been published in Kramers Ergot, and has been shown at galleries in New York and Los Angeles. Forgues had a monthly comic strip, Monorail High, in Mothers News, a monthly newspaper published in Providence, Rhode Island.

His comics and graphic novels make heavy use of surrealism and absurdity, while often paying homage to older comic genres such as pulp. He has been praised by The Comics Reporter for his skills at "overlooked nuances of comics storytelling, in particular pacing".

As a musician, Forgues has toured the United States several times, also appearing in Europe and Canada. He employs homemade electronics, effects pedals, and altered acoustic instruments. Forgues has cited influences including Roxy Music, T. Rex, Faust, Kim Carnes, the Raincoats, Ceramic Hello, GG Allin, OMD, Steely Dan, Wolfgang Voigt, the Fugs, and Steven Halpern.

== Selected work ==
=== Music ===
- Kites: Royal Paint With The Metallic Gardener From The United States Of America Helped Into An Open Field By Women And Children (2004)
- Kites: Peace Trials (Load Records, 2006)
- Kites: Hallucination Guillotine/Final Worship (Load Records, 2008)
- Daily Life: Necessary and Pathetic (Load Records, 2010)

=== Books ===
- Brinkman, Matt; Forgues, Christopher; Simmons, Josh; Smyth, Fiona (2005). Free Radicals. PictureBox. ISBN 097136706X.
- F., C. (2007). Powr Mastrs: Volume 1. PictureBox. ISBN 978-0978972288.
- F., C. (2008). Gale, David; Ellery, Jonathan (eds.). Powr Mastrs: Volume 2. PictureBox. ISBN 978-0-9815622-1-6.
- Powr Mastrs Vol. 3 (PictureBox, 2010)
- Sediment (PictureBox, 2011)
- Mere (PictureBox, 2013)
- Forgues, Christopher (2019). Pierrot Alterations. Anthology Editions. ISBN 978-1944860233.
