= Buenaventura Press =

American publisher and distributor of comics

- Status: Defunct (2010)
- Founded: 2004
- Founder: Alvin Buenaventura
- Successor: Pigeon Press (2010–2016)
- Country of origin: U.S.
- Headquarters location: Oakland, California
- Publication types: Comics
- Official website: www.buenaventurapress.com

Buenaventura Press was a publisher and distributor for comics, prints, anthologies and graphic novels based in Oakland, California, run by Alvin Buenaventura.

== Publishing history ==
Buenaventura Press originally specialized in handcrafted fine press prints, producing works for Gary Panter, Daniel Clowes, Julie Doucet, Chris Ware and others, before it extended its operations to publishing works in various book formats.

The company closed in January 2010, in many ways because of the costs involved in publishing Kramers Ergot #7 (which appeared in 2008 at a retail price of $125).

In September 2010, Alvin Buenaventura launched a new company, Pigeon Press, publishing books & prints and dealing in original art.

Buenaventura died by suicide in February 2016.

== Titles published ==
=== Comic books ===
- Boy’s Club 2 and 3 by Matt Furie (Boy's Club #1 was published by Tim Goodyear's Teenage Dinosaur)
- Comic Book Holocaust and Klassic Komix Klub by Johnny Ryan
- Elvis Road by Elvis Studio by Helge Reumann & Xavier Robel
- Hunter and Painter by Tom Gauld
- Destined for Dizziness and The Neighborhood by Souther Salazar
- Yeast Hoist #12: Stop Thinking Start Sleeping Stop Sleeping Start Living by Ron Rege Jr.
- Spaniel Rage by Vanessa Davis
- Injury #1, #2 and #3 by Ted May, Jason Robards, and Jeff Wilson

=== Journals, anthologies and other works ===
- Comic Art Magazine issues 8 and 9 edited by Todd Hignite (2006, 2007)
- Kramers Ergot 6 edited by Sammy Harkham (2006)
- Kramers Ergot 7 edited by Sammy Harkham (2008)
- New York Sketches; a portfolio of drawings by Adrian Tomine (2004)
- Private Stash: A Pinup-Girl Portfolio by 20 Cartoonists by Robert Crumb, Adrian Tomine, Jaime Hernandez et al. (2006)
- Dawn by Phil Elverum (2008)
- The Complete Jack Survives by Jerry Moriarty (2009)

== Award nominations ==
- 2008 Ignatz Award nominee for Outstanding Series: Injury #2 by Ted May, Jason Robards, Jeff Wilson
- 2007 Ignatz Award nominee for Outstanding Artist: Vanessa Davis Spaniel Rage
- 2007 Eisner Award nominee for Best Anthology: Kramer's Ergot 6
