= Steven Weissman =

American cartoonist (b. 1968)

- Born: Steven Knight Weissman; June 4, 1968 (age 58) California
- Area: Cartoonist
- Pseudonym: Ribs
- Notable works: Yikes; Chewing Gum in Church; Don't Call Me Stupid; Barack Hussein Obama
- Awards: Harvey Award, 1998

Steven Weissman (born June 4, 1968, in California) is an alternative cartoonist best known for his offbeat and bizarre explorations of childhood friendships. His work has been published by Alternative Comics, Fantagraphics, and Retrofit Comics.

== Career ==
Weissman began his career in the mid-1990s in alternative comics with the self-published series Yikes! (later published by Alternative Comics), which featured Charlie Brown–like characters modeled on classic Hollywood monsters.

Around the end of Barack Obama's first presidential term, Weissman transitioned into political cartooning after being recruited by Fantagraphics to produce a weekly online strip focusing on Obama and his cast of characters (Secretary of State Hillary Clinton, Vice President Joe Biden, and the Obama family) experiencing life in a parallel universe. This was collected in graphic novel form in Barack Hussein Obama (Fantagraphics, 2012). During this period, Weissman's political cartoons also appeared on the humor website Super Deluxe.

In addition to this solo titles, Weissman has contributed to such anthologies as Buzzard, Small Press Expo: SPX '98, Bizarro Comics, and Kramers Ergot issues #9-10. In 2024, Weissman and Sammy Harkham co-edited the anthology Peep, co-published by Brain Dead and Kyle Ng.

== Awards ==
- 1997 (nomination) Ignatz Award for Breakout Talent
- 1998:
  - Harvey Award for Best New Series for Yikes!
  - (nomination) Ignatz Award for Outstanding Series for Yikes!
- 2025 (nomination) Eisner Award for Best Anthology for Peep

== Selected bibliography ==
- Tykes (Alternative Comics, 1997)
- Yikes (Alternative Comics, 1998)
- Lemon Kids (Alternative Comics, 1999)
- Champs (Fantagraphics, 1999) ISBN 1-56097-372-2
- Fichtre! (Amok éditions, 2000) ISBN 2-911842-49-9
- Don't Call Me Stupid (Fantagraphics, 2001) ISBN 978-1-56097-431-4
- White Flower Day (Fantagraphics, 2002) ISBN 1-56097-514-8
- The Kid Firechief (Fantagraphics, 2004) ISBN 978-1-56097-866-4
- Chewing Gum in Church (Fantagraphics, 2006) ISBN 1-56097-736-1
- Mean (Fantagraphics, 2007) ISBN 978-1-56097-866-4
- Chocolate Cheeks (Fantagraphics, 2010) ISBN 978-1-56097-927-2
- Barack Hussein Obama (Fantagraphics, 2012) ISBN 978-160699623-2
- Mutiny on the Mousey (Stinckers, 2014)
- Butter and Blood (Retrofit/Big Planet, 2015) ISBN 978-1940398426
- Looking for America's Dog (Fantagraphics, 2016) ISBN 978-1606999554
