= Marshall Smith =

Marshall Smith may refer to:

- Marshall Smith (politician), Canadian politician and member of the Green Party of Canada
- Marshall S. Smith, American educator
- Dark Night Smith, American baseball player sometimes listed as Marshall Smith
- Marshall–Smith syndrome, characterized by unusual accelerated skeletal maturation
- Marshall Smith (discus thrower) (born 1953), American discus thrower, 1975 NCAA discus runner-up for the Colorado State Rams track and field team
