= Marc Bell (cartoonist) =

Canadian cartoonist and artist

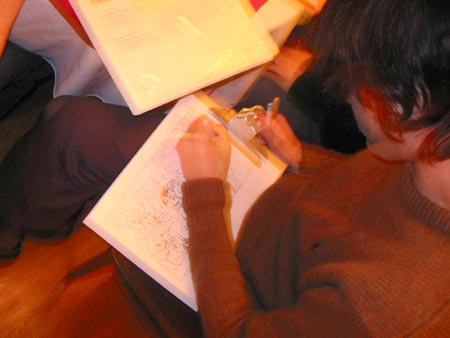
- Artist at work; A photo of Marc Bell taken at the Monthly Montreal Comix Jam, February 25, 2004
- Born: Marc Bell London, Ontario
- Areas: Cartoonist, Artist
- Notable works: Shrimpy and Paul and Friends, Hot Potatoe, Pure Pajamas, Stroppy

Marc Bell is a Canadian cartoonist and artist. He was initially known for creating comic strips (such as Shrimpy and Paul), but Bell has also created several exhibitions of his mixed media work and watercoloured drawings. Hot Potatoe [sic], a monograph of his work, was released in 2009. His comics have appeared in many Canadian weeklies, Vice, and LA Weekly. He has been published in numerous anthologies, such as Kramers Ergot and The Ganzfeld.

In 2012, Bell's Pure Pajamas was a finalist for the Ignatz Award for Outstanding Artist.

== Publications ==
- Boof, 1992, Caliber Press (Plymouth, MI)
- Hep, 1993, Caliber Press (Plymouth, MI)
- The Mojo Action Companion Unit Vol.2 #1, 1997, Exclaim! (Toronto, ON)
- Shrimpy and Paul and Friends, 2003, Highwater Books (Brooklyn, NY)
- Worn Tuff Elbow #1, 2004, Fantagraphics (Seattle, WA)
- The Stacks, 2004, Drawn & Quarterly (Montreal, PQ)
- The Hobbit (with Peter Thompson), 2005, PictureBox (Brooklyn, NY)
- Fresh From Kiev, 2005, Bulb Comix (Geneva, CH)
- Nog a Dod (editor), 2006, Conundrum Press (Montreal, PQ) in association with PictureBox
- Ganzfeld #5 (co-editor), 2007, PictureBox (Brooklyn, NY)
- Illusztraijuns for Brain Police [sic], 2008, Drawn & Quarterly/Half World Books (Montreal, PQ)
- Hot Potatoe [sic], 2009, Drawn & Quarterly (Montreal, PQ)
- Kelp Stingray (with Matthew Thurber), 2009, Nieves (Zurich, CH)
- Shrimpy et Paul, 2010, Editions Cornélius (Paris, FR)
- Dirty Dishes (editor) by Amy Lockhart, 2010, Drawn & Quarterly (Montreal, PQ)
- Pure Pajamas, 2011, Drawn & Quarterly (Montreal, PQ)
- Shrimpy e Paul, 2012, A Bolha Editora (Rio de Janeiro, BR)
- Rudy (editor) by Mark Connery, 2014, 2D Cloud (Minneapolis, MN)
- Love and Forgiveness (editor) by Joe Hale, 2014, Swimmers Group (Toronto, ON)
- Boutique Mag #1, 2014, Colour Code Printing (Toronto, ON)
- Stroppy, 2015, Drawn & Quarterly (Montreal, PQ)
- 18 Sausages (Boutique Mag #3), 2018, No World Books, (Vancouver, BC)
- Stroppy, 2018, Editions Cornelius, (Bordeaux, FR)
- Stroppy, 2018, La Cúpula and Hotel De La Ideas, (Barcelona, SP) and (Buenos Aires, AR)
- Worn Tuff Elbow #2, 2018, No World Books (Vancouver, BC)
- Boutique Mag #4, 2019, No World Books and Neoglyphic Media (Bellingham, WA)
- Banal Complications, 2020, mini kuš! #90, kuš! (Riga, Latvia)
- Boutique Mag #5, 2022, No World Books and Neoglyphic Media (Bellingham, WA)
- Dear Foghorn Of Legs (or: The Ongoing War With Paper or: Boutique Mag #6), 2023, L'Appat (Brussels, BXL)
- Raw Sewage Science Fiction, 2024, Drawn & Quarterly (Montreal, PQ)
- Worn Tuff Elbow #3, 2024, No World Books (Vancouver, BC), distributed by Drawn & Quarterly (Montreal, PQ)
- Non-Brut Funnies #1, 2024, No World Books (Vancouver, BC)
- Corn Comics #1, 2024, Fatbottom Books/Apa Apa Cómics (Barcelona, SP)
- Alive Outside (co-edited with Cullen Beckhorn), 2024, Neoglyphic Media (Bellingham, WA)

== Anthology work ==
- Rosetta, "He Works Inside the Condiment Dispenser", 2002, Alternative Comics (Gainesville, FL), four endflaps on covers
- L’enfance Dub Cyclope 2, "Il N’Y A Pas D’Issue!", Zone Convective (Montreal PQ), 10 pages (French translation)
- The Ganzfeld #3, "The DUHY Science Network", 2003, Monday Morning (New York, NY), 6 pages
- Kramers Ergot #4, "There is No Escape!", 2003, Avodah Books (Los Angeles, CA), 23 pages
- Kramers Ergot #5, "Fallen Angel" (plus other assorted material), 2004, Gingko Press (Corte Madera, CA), 26 pages
- Black #3, "Le Royaume Sacre de Shrimpy", 2005, Coconino Press (Paris, France), 22 pages (French translation)
- The Ganzfeld #4, "Gustun on These Layers of the Earth", 2005, PictureBox (Brooklyn, NY), 14 pages
- Kramers Ergot #6, "Pile of Bacon", 2006, Buenaventura Press and Avodah Books (Los Angeles, CA), 12 pages
- An Anthology of Graphic Fiction, Cartoons, & True Stories, "Supernatural Hot Rug and not Used #1", 2006, Yale University Press (New Haven, CT), 3 pages
- The Ganzfeld #7, "A History of the All-Star Schnauzer Band", 2007, PictureBox (Brooklyn, NY), 6 pages
- The Where, the Why, and the How, "What Drives Plate Platonics", 2012, Chronicle Books (San Francisco, CA), 1 page
- Drawn & Quarterly 25th Anniversary, "Shrimpy is in Trouble", 2015, Drawn & Quarterly (Montreal, PQ), 2 pages
- Kramers Ergot #9 by Marc Bell (a) and Joe Hale (w), "Calendar", 2016, Fantagraphics Books (Seattle, WA), 1 page
- s! #26 (dADa), "Still Kicking", 2016, kuš!, (Riga, Latvia), 4 pages
- Kramers Ergot #10, "Slogan Schnauzer", 2019, Fantagraphics Books (Seattle, WA), 10 pages

== Solo exhibitions ==
- 2002. Calm Center, The Blinding Light!! Cinema, Vancouver, BC
- 2004. The Stacks, Adam Baumgold Gallery, New York, NY
- 2005. Bloo Chip, Adam Baumgold Gallery, New York, NY
- 2007. Egypt Buncake, Adam Baumgold Gallery, New York, NY
- 2008. Illusztraijuns For Brain Police, Librairie Drawn & Quarterly, Montreal, QC
- 2008. Illustrated Cartoon Videos, Paul Bright Gallery, Toronto, ON
- 2009. Hot Potatoe, Adam Baumgold Gallery, New York, NY
- 2010. Did Yoo See The Exhibition Of The Chunky Floors?, Owens Art Gallery, Mount Allison University, Sackville, NB
- 2010. Modurn Mithoes, Lambiek, Amsterdam, NL
- 2011. Honk If You Pay Throo the Schnozz, Rodman Hall, Brock University, St. Catharines, ON
- 2013. Ornate Investment Banker, Cooper Cole, Toronto, ON
- 2014. Wilder Hobson’s Theater Absurd-o, Art Centre Nevsky 8, St. Petersburg, Russia
- 2015. Leftovers Again (The War With Paper, Continued), Weird Things, Toronto, ON
- 2018. Hoser~Glyphs, Peanuts Gallery, Vancouver, BC
- 2018. Puritanical Psychic Attack!, Weird Things, Toronto, ON
- 2019. Prestidigitateur à Trois Cartes (Mise à Jour), Toto Club, Bordeaux, FR
- 2020. Shoe Reviews Online And Other Replacement Works, Massy Arts, Vancouver, BC
- 2023. Cruller Error, Lucky's Comics & Gallery, Vancouver, BC
- 2024. Excerpts From Worn Tuff Elbow #3 (and #2), Fatbottom Books, Barcelona, SP
- 2024. Raw Sewage Science Fiction, Grafixx Festival, Antwerp, BE
- 2025. Total Residuum, THIS Gallery, Vancouver, BC

== Solo and collaborative self-published booklets ==
- Alan Thick Half-Rave with Bob Hope Featuring Jay Leno
- Arbeitees #1–2
- Atum Bom
- Belly Wot Leaflet! (three issues; annual issues)
- Big Boy #1–2
- Big Pile Comics
- Big Snork Special 2019
- Birthday Moustache
- Bloo Chip
- Boutique Mag #2
- Call Larry About the Ironing Board
- Construct
- Cowabunga Schnauzer (Belly Wot Leaflet 2013 special edition)
- Dongery
- Dr. Booze
- Food Court Foodies
- Future Man
- Fwob Ob Obi Won
- Gooma
- Hassle-Free
- Hippy #1
- Ig
- Islade Art Fair
- Kelp Stingray
- Knoze Clippah! (several editions)
- Layer of the Ea_th
- M.A.C.U. (multiple issues)
- Musician's Cornfest Annual (multiple issues)
- No. 1 Cup
- P.M.F. #1–4
- Piss on the Hawkin
- Portugese Shovel #1–2 [sic]
- Product #1–2
- Puffer #1–7
- Put Your Life Away
- Return of the King
- Schematic Diagrams for Proposed Objects
- Senior Set
- Shipping Saver #1
- Shut-Up World
- Sleepy Pie
- Society
- Stacks
- Stand Tall Guru vol. 1, 3
- Swed
- That Ol’ Drunken Puffer
- There Is Nothing + More!
- This Booklet Contains
- Toe Toddler #1
- Totally Psychedoolick
- Turf Godz
- Tired of Drawing Books
- Two Towers
- Thanksgiving Amoeba (several editions)
- WHAT
- Waffle Moo-Moo Towel #1
- Who Cares?
