= Dearraindrop =

Artist collective based in Virginia Beach, Virginia

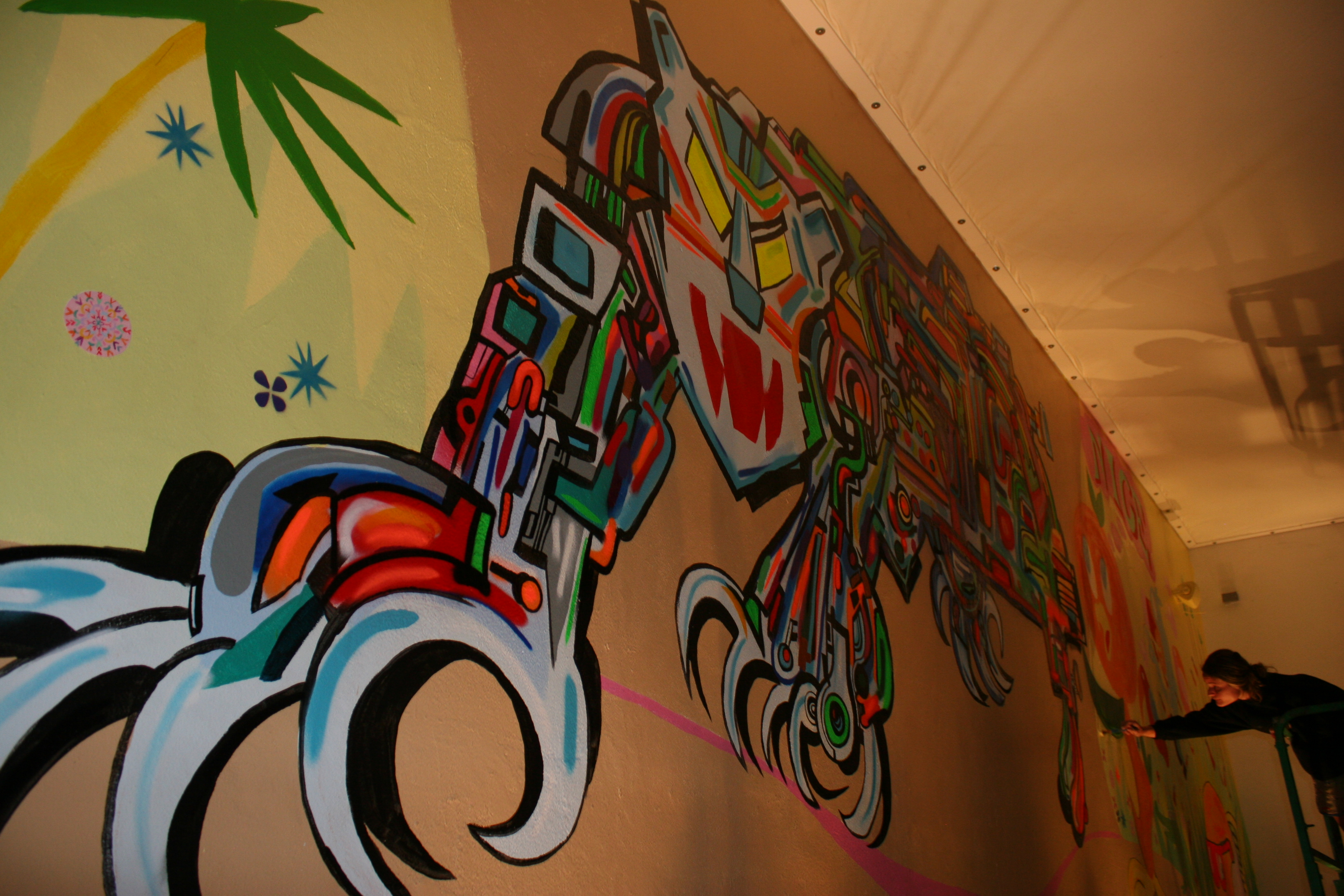
Dearraindrop painting Mural at Wynwood Walls in Miami

Dearraindrop is an artist collective based in Virginia Beach, Virginia. Dearraindrop incorporates diverse disciplines that work together to create multifaceted sculptures and installations. Part of the collective's operating philosophy is modeled on the idea that our greatest human capability is the ability to work together to achieve a greater goal. Dearraindrop work incorporates painting, collage, video, large-scale, interactive installation pieces, and hand-fabricated musical instruments.

Joe Grillo and Laura Grant founded Dearraindrop in 1998 as a clothing line. The collective is currently composed of three artists: Joe Grillo, Laura Grant, and Billy Grant. In the past, Dearraindrop has worked with digital electricians Owen Osborn and Chris Kuscinski and painter Alika Herreshoff.

In 2010 Joe Grillo and Laura Grant moved their studio to Brooklyn, New York, and are producing work for upcoming exhibitions in Los Angeles, New York, and Norway.

== Selected solo exhibitions ==
2011

"Facemaker", "Royal/T", Culver City, California.

2010

"Hot Glue Hullabaloo", "The Hole", New York, New York.

2008

Hidden In, V1 Gallery, Copenhagen, Denmark.

Computer Game Blues, Philadelphia Institute for Advanced Study, Philadelphia, Pennsylvania.

Scared Straight, Perugi Artecontemporanea, Padua, Italy.

2007

Sci-fi Classicsx GAD, Oslo, Norway

Qualquer Bobagem, Iconic Gallery, Lisbon, Portugal

2006

Concrete Trees, Glass Grass, and Cream-filled Stones, Loyal Gallery, Stockholm, Sweden. Swedish rock band Träd, Gräs & Stenar performed live at the opening.

V-B, V1 Gallery, Copenhagen, Denmark.

W.Epaminondas Adrastus Blab, Katherine Mulherin Contemporary Art, Toronto, Canada

2005

Magic Brain, Perugi Artecontemporanea, Padua, Italy.

2004

Riddle of the Sphinx at Deitch Projects. This installation was also shown at the Art Basel Miami International Art Fair.

Tylenol Island, P.S.1 Contemporary Art Center, Queens, New York.

== Selected group exhibitions ==
2011

"Facemaker", Royal/T, Culver City, California

2010

"Hot Glue Hullabaloo", The Hole NYC, New York, New York, a collaboration with artist Kenny Scharf

2007

Mad Love, Arken Museum of Modern Art, Denmark.

2004

Dreamland Artist Club, Coney Island, Brooklyn. Curated by Steve Powers.

== Books ==
2006

Magic Brain

2005

Off/On. Preface written by culture critic and curator Carlo McCormick.

== Music recordings ==
2005

Asidd Rainn LP
