= Renée French =

American comics writer and illustrator

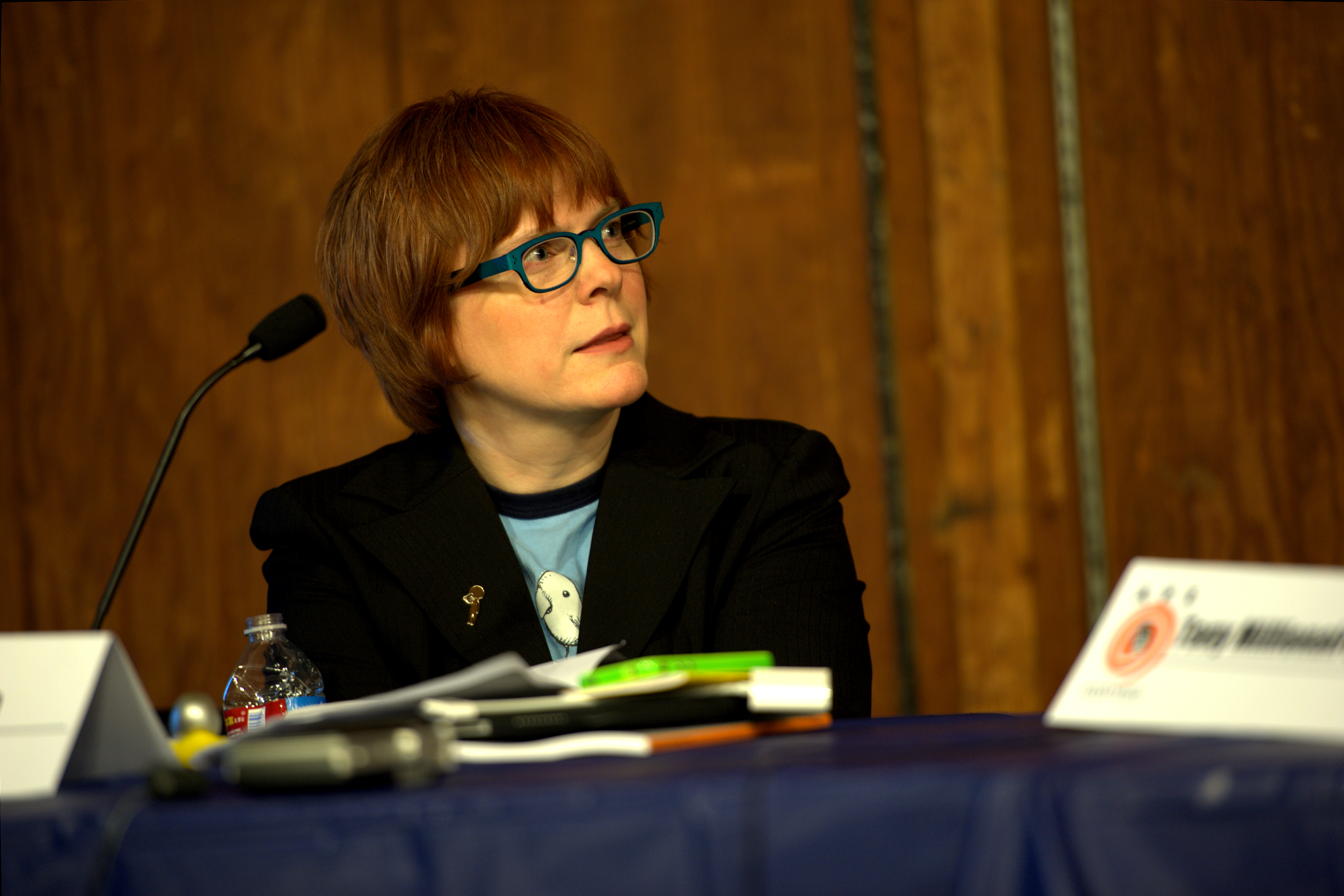
- French at the 2010 Alternative Press Expo
- Born: 1963 (age 62–63)
- Occupations: comics writer and illustrator
- Spouse: Rob Pike
- Writing career
- Pen name: Rainy Dohaney
- Website: instagram.com/reneefrench/

Renée French (born 1963) is an American comics writer and illustrator and, under the pen name Rainy Dohaney, a children's book author, and exhibiting artist.

Her work is characterized by her "obsessive-looking and highly unsettling visual style."

== Books ==
Her work includes H Day (Picturebox), The Soap Lady (inspired by the display in the Mütter Museum) (Top Shelf Productions), The Ticking (Top Shelf Productions), and Micrographica (Top Shelf Productions), Edison Steelhead's Lost Portfolio: Exploratory Studies of Girls and Rabbits (Sparkplug Books), and Marbles in My Underpants (Oni Press). She also has a weekly strip The Taint in the New York Press. Her serialized comic Baby Bjornstrand appears on the Study Group Comic Books website. The New York Times said her graphic novels "split the difference between adorable and horrifically gross"; writing about "Baby Bjornstrand", they called it "equal parts Daffy Duck and Samuel Beckett, and all quirky Renée French".

French has a serialized illustrated story in the Fantagraphics Books quarterly Mome called "Almost Sound". She is also the author of the comic book for children, Barry's Best Buddy, released by Toon Books in 2013.

== Artistic influences ==
As a child, French found a book plate of Hieronymus Bosch's The Garden of Earthly Delights and was enchanted by it. In regards to the influence, French stated "I don't know how many hours I stared at it under the covers, but I'd memorised each little scene within the paintings and thought about them all the time. That world was so real to me."

French suffers from migraines, which she uses to her creative advantage, as detailed in an interview with WOW x WOW. Her book, H Day, is "an attempt to show what it's like to have a migraine, from the outside and the inside." According to French, "most of the portraits with things exploding out of the face or the skin warping around the head, are based on the migraines."

== Mascots ==
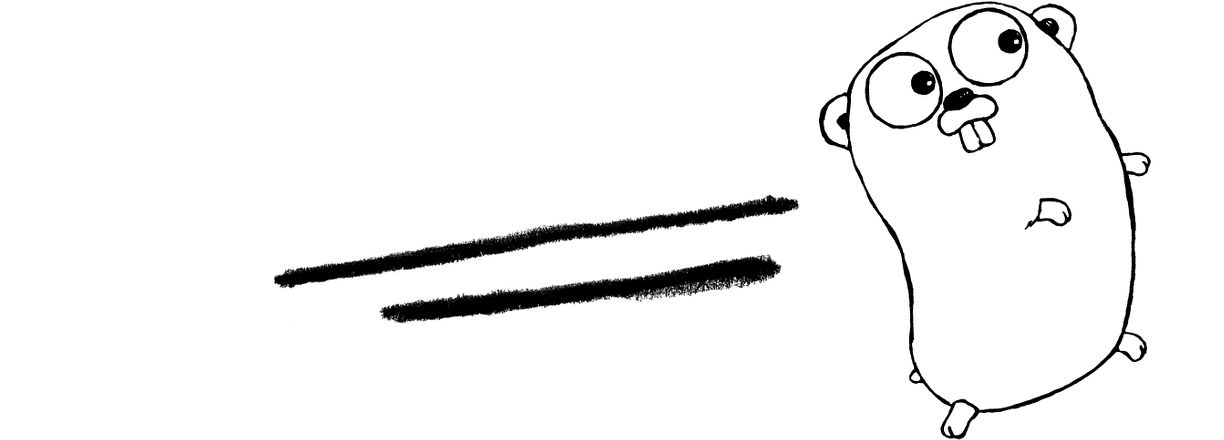
Mascot for the Go programming language

French drew both the mascot of the Plan 9 from Bell Labs operating system ("Glenda", aka "the Plan 9 Bunny"), and the gopher mascot for the Go programming language.

== Personal life ==
French grew up in New Jersey, and was always drawing as a child. French is married to Rob Pike, one of the creators of Plan 9 from Bell Labs, and of the Go programming language at Google. They split their time between the United States and Australia.

== Awards ==
In 2003, French was nominated for the Ignatz Award for Outstanding Artist for her contribution to the Alternative Comics anthology Rosetta. In 2007, French was nominated for a number of comics industry awards — including for best artist nods from the Eisner, Ignatz, and Harvey Awards — for the graphic novel The Ticking. French won the Inkpot Award at the 2007 San Diego Comic Con.

== Bibliography ==
=== Select comics works ===
- Hagelbarger and That Nightmare Goat (Yam Books), 2013. ISBN 978-0985413828
- Barry's Best Buddy (Toon Books) 2013
- Bjornstrand (PictureBox) September 2012
- Baby Bjornstrand (Koyama Press) September 2014
- H Day (PictureBox) 2010
- Micrographica (Top Shelf Productions) 2007
- The Ticking (Top Shelf Productions) 2006
- Marbles in my Underpants (Oni Press)
- The Soap Lady (Top Shelf Productions)
- The Adventures of Rheumy Peepers & Chunky Highlights (Oni Press)
- Grit Bath (Fantagraphics)
- Edison Steelhead's Lost Portfolio: Exploratory Studies of Girls and Rabbits (Sparkplug Books) June 2007. ISBN 978-0974271576

=== Children's books (as Rainy Dohaney) ===
- My Best Sweet Potato (Atheneum Books) 2006
- Tinka (Atheneum Books) 2005
