= Jerry Moriarty =

American painter and cartoonist

- Moriarty in 2010
- Born: January 15, 1938 Binghamton, New York, US
- Died: March 25, 2026 (aged 88) Binghamton, New York, US
- Areas: Cartoonist, Writer, Artist
- Notable works: Jack Survives

Jerome Brien Moriarty (January 15, 1938 – March 25, 2026) was an American artist and teacher at the School of Visual Arts (SVA) in Manhattan. He described himself as a "paintoonist".

== Education and career ==
Born in Binghamton, New York, in 1938, Moriarty entered the Pratt Institute in 1956 and earned a BFA in 1960. After graduating he worked as a freelance magazine illustrator to support his Abstract Expressionist painting. He gave up abstraction in 1963 and starting his teaching career at the School of Visual Arts.

Moriarty had his first one-man show in 1974 in SoHo. Subsequently, he has featured in exhibitions in Chelsea in 1984, at the SVA Museum in 1999 and at CUE Art Foundation in 2004". He received a NEA grant in 1977.

His cartoonist work Jack Survives was first published in the first number of Art Spiegelman´s RAW (magazine) in 1980, featured in later issues and first collected as a RAW-One-Shot, No. 3, in 1984. In 2009, at the age of 71, he published The Complete Jack Survives with Buenaventura Press.

Other projects include A Visual Crime, four double-page illustrations accompanied with a short story in the 1990 anthology Gin & Comix and the Sally's Surprise series of multi-panel paintings.

Chris Ware credited him for "introducing solemnity and eternity in a medium that normally trades in the snappy and the lurid".

Moriarty died on March 25, 2026, at his home in Binghamton, New York.
