= Mome (comics) =

Quarterly full-color comics anthology

MOME

Publication information
- Publisher: Fantagraphics Books
- Schedule: Quarterly
- Format: Ongoing series
- Genre: Alternative
- Publication date: 2005–2011
- No. of issues: 22
- Editor: Eric Reynolds

Mome was a quarterly full-color comics anthology edited by Eric Reynolds and published by Fantagraphics Books. ("Mome" is an archaic term for a fool or a blockhead.)

Mome was conceived as a contemporary literary journal, albeit one that tells its stories via the medium of comics rather than prose. It features stories by a core roster of young cartoonists, including Andrice Arp, Gabrielle Bell, Jonathan Bennett, Jeffrey Brown, Martin Cendreda, Sophie Crumb, Eleanor Davis, David Heatley, Paul Hornschemeier, Anders Nilsen, John Pham, and Kurt Wolfgang; as well as irregular contributions from other cartoonists such as Al Columbia, Jim Woodring and Tim Hensley. Each issue also includes an interview with one of the contributors conducted by Gary Groth.

Mome's final issue, #22, was published in 2011; it was a 240-page double-sized issue.

== Issues ==
1. Summer 2005 (Vol. 1). The debut issue, featuring Gabrielle Bell, Kurt Wolfgang, Martin Cendreda, Jeffrey Brown, Paul Hornschemeier, John Pham, David Heatley, Anders Nilsen, Jonathan Bennett, Sophie Crumb and Andrice Arp. Includes an interview with Paul Hornschemeier and covers by Gabrielle Bell.
2. Fall 2005 (Vol. 2). Tim Hensley makes his Mome debut. Also included: Nilsen, Bennett, Wolfgang, Cendreda, Hornschemeier, Crumb, Bell, Heatley, Pham, Brown and Arp. Plus: A Gabrielle Bell interview and covers by Jonathan Bennett.
3. Winter 2006 (Vol. 3). Featuring Cendreda, Nilsen, Bennett, Heatley, Arp, Bell and Brown. Plus an interview with Kurt Wolfgang, as well as the debuts of David B. (contributing the 36-page "Armed Garden") and R. Kikuo Johnson. Covers by David B.
4. Spring/Summer 2006 (Vol. 4). Featuring Heatley, Nilsen, Crumb, Cendreda, Bennett, Hornschemeier, Pham, Bell and Brown. Includes an interview with Jonathan Bennett, David B.'s 33-page "The Veiled Prophet", and R. Kikuo Johnson's "John James Audubon". Covers by John Pham.
5. Fall 2006 (Vol. 5). Featuring Arp, Nilsen, Crumb, Brown, Hornschemeier, Bell and Wolfgang. Hensley returns with his first "Wally Gropius" strips, Andrice Arp is interviewed, and Zak Sally and Robert Goodin make their MOME debuts. Covers by Tim Hensley.
6. Winter 2007 (Vol. 6). :Featuring Johnson, Hensley, Cendreda, Nilsen, Heatley, Brown, Hornschemeier, Crumb, Bennett, Bell and Wolfgang. Tim Hensley is interviewed, while French cartoonists Émile Bravo and Lewis Trondheim make their first appearances. Covers by Martin Cendreda.
7. Spring 2007 (Vol. 7). Featuring the MOME debuts of Al Columbia, Eleanor Davis, and Tom Kaczynski, as well as returning artists Heatley, Hornschemeier, Bell, Crumb, Wolfgang, Trondheim, Arp, and Nilsen. Anders Nilsen is interviewed, under covers by Lewis Trondheim.
8. Summer 2007 (Vol. 8). Featuring the MOME debuts of Ray Fenwick and Joe Kimball, and sophomore stories by Kaczynski, Davis (who is cover-featured and interviewed), Columbia, and Émile Bravo, whose "Young Americans" in this issue is a 2008 Eisner Award Nominee for "Best Short Story". Plus regulars Crumb, Bennett, Hornschemeier, and the final chapter of Trondheim's "At Loose Ends", also nominated for said Eisner Award.
9. Fall 2007 (Vol. 9). Featuring return favorites Fenwick, Hensley, Columbia, Davis, Bell, Arp, Kimball, Kaczynski, Wolfgang, Hornschemeier, and Crumb. Also: a collaboration between O. Henry Prize-winning author Brian Evenson and Zak Sally; a ballpoint gallery from frequent Built to Spill album artist, Mike Scheer; the first part (of two) of a 45-page "Frank" story by Jim Woodring, "The Lute String", previously published only in Japan. Our fattest issue yet.
10. Winter/Spring 2008 (Vol. 10). Featuring original covers by Al Columbia, as well as returning favorites Crumb, Fenwick, Bravo, Goodin, Kaczynski, Wolfgang, Hornschemeier and Hensley. Also: the second and final chapter of Woodring's "The Lute String", as well as the debuts of Dash Shaw, John Hankiewicz, and Jeremy Eaton, and an interview with Tom Kaczynski conducted by Gary Groth.
11. Summer 2008 (Vol. 11). Featuring covers by and the Mome debut of French great Killoffer, as well as Mome familiars Columbia, Wolfgang, Fenwick, Davis, Shaw, Hankiewicz, Bravo, Arp, Kaczynski and Hornschemeier. Also: an interview with Ray Fenwick by Gary Groth, and the debuts of Nate Neal and Conor O'Keefe.
12. Fall 2008 (Vol. 12). Featuring covers by and the Mome debut of Olivier Schrauwen, as well as the debuts of Jon Vermilyea, Derek Van Gieson, and Sara Edward-Corbett. Also, returning regulars Crumb, Neal, Fenwick, Shaw, Kaczynski, Columbia, Killoffer, David B., and Hornschemeier.
13. Winter 2009 (Vol. 13). Original covers by Dash Shaw and the story "Satellite CMYK", as well as the first chapter (of three) of Gilbert Shelton & Pic's "Last Gig in Shnagrlig", and the debuts of T. Ott, Josh Simmons, Laura Park, and David Greenberger. Also, returning regulars Hensley, O'Keefe, Wolfgang, Neal, Edward-Corbett and Van Gieson.
14. Spring 2009 (Vol. 14). Covers by Lilli Carré, spotlighting her 32-page graphic novella, "The Carnival". Also: Shelton & Pic, Van Gieson, Park, Shaw, Fenwick, Edward-Corbett, O'Keefe, Bravo, Vermilyea, and Simmons. Plus: A special "Cold Heat story by Frank Santoro, Ben Jones and Jon Vermilyea, and a Spanish treat from Hernán Migoya and Juaco Vizuete.
15. Summer 2009 (Vol. 15). Covers by Andrice Arp. Featuring the first chapter of T. Edward Bak's "Wild Man", and the final chapters of Hensley's "Wally Gropius" and Shelton & Pic's "Last Gig in Shnagrlig". Also: Arp, Edward-Corbett, Fenwick, O'Keefe, Neal, Goodin, Shaw, and the MOME debut of Noah Van Sciver. Plus: a special, 16-page bound-in minicomic by Spanish cartoonist Max.
16. Fall 2009 (Vol. 16). Covers by Renée French, spotlighting the first chapter of "Almost Sound". Other MOME debuts include work by Archer Prewitt, Nicholas Mahler, and the first chapter of "The Moolah Tree" by Ted Stearn. Plus: Shaw, Carré, O'Keefe, Jones, Santoro, Vermilyea, Park, Neal, Edward-Corbett, and Bak.

== Awards ==
Mome was nominated for a 2007 Harvey Award for Best Anthology. It was also nominated for a 2008 Eisner Award for Best Anthology.

== See also ==
- 5:45 A.M.
