= Sammy Harkham =

American cartoonist and editor (born 1980)

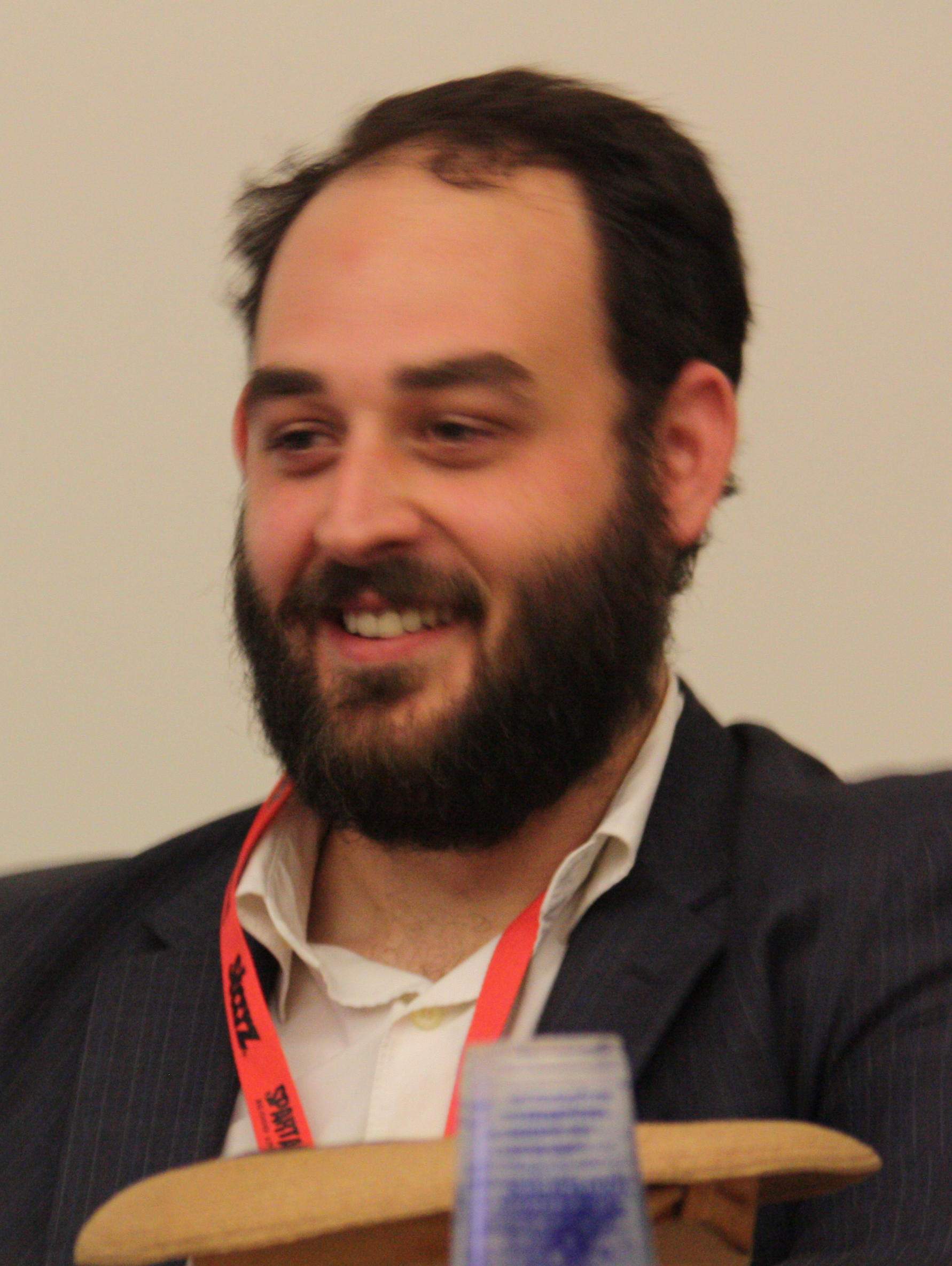
- Harkham in 2009
- Born: May 21, 1980 (age 46) Los Angeles, California
- Areas: Cartoonist, Editor, Publisher
- Notable works: Kramers Ergot

Sammy Harkham (born May 21, 1980) is an American cartoonist and editor, best known for editing the Kramers Ergot alternative comics anthology.

His own work can be found in his ongoing comic book series Crickets, which was published by Drawn & Quarterly for its first two issues but is now self-published. Blood of the Virgin, which ran as an extended story in Crickets for 14 years, was released in collected form in May 2023 by Pantheon Books.

In 2024, Harkham and cartoonist Steven Weissman co-edited the anthology Peep (co-published by Brain Dead and Kyle Ng); it was nominated for an Eisner Award for Best Anthology in 2025.

He is the co-owner of the Family Bookstore in Los Angeles, and the co-founder of Cinefamily (now known as Fairfax Cinema). His father is developer Uri Harkham.

== Awards and honors ==
- 2002 Ignatz Award nominated for Promising New Talent
- 2012 Los Angeles Times Book Prize for Everything Together: Collected Stories

== Bibliography ==
- Poor Sailor. Ginko Press. 2005. ISBN 9781584231844.
- Everything Together: Collected Stories. Picturebox. 2012. ISBN 9780985159504.
- Blood of the Virgin. Pantheon. 2023. ISBN 9780593316696.
