= Ron Regé Jr. =

American alternative cartoonist and musician (b. 1969)

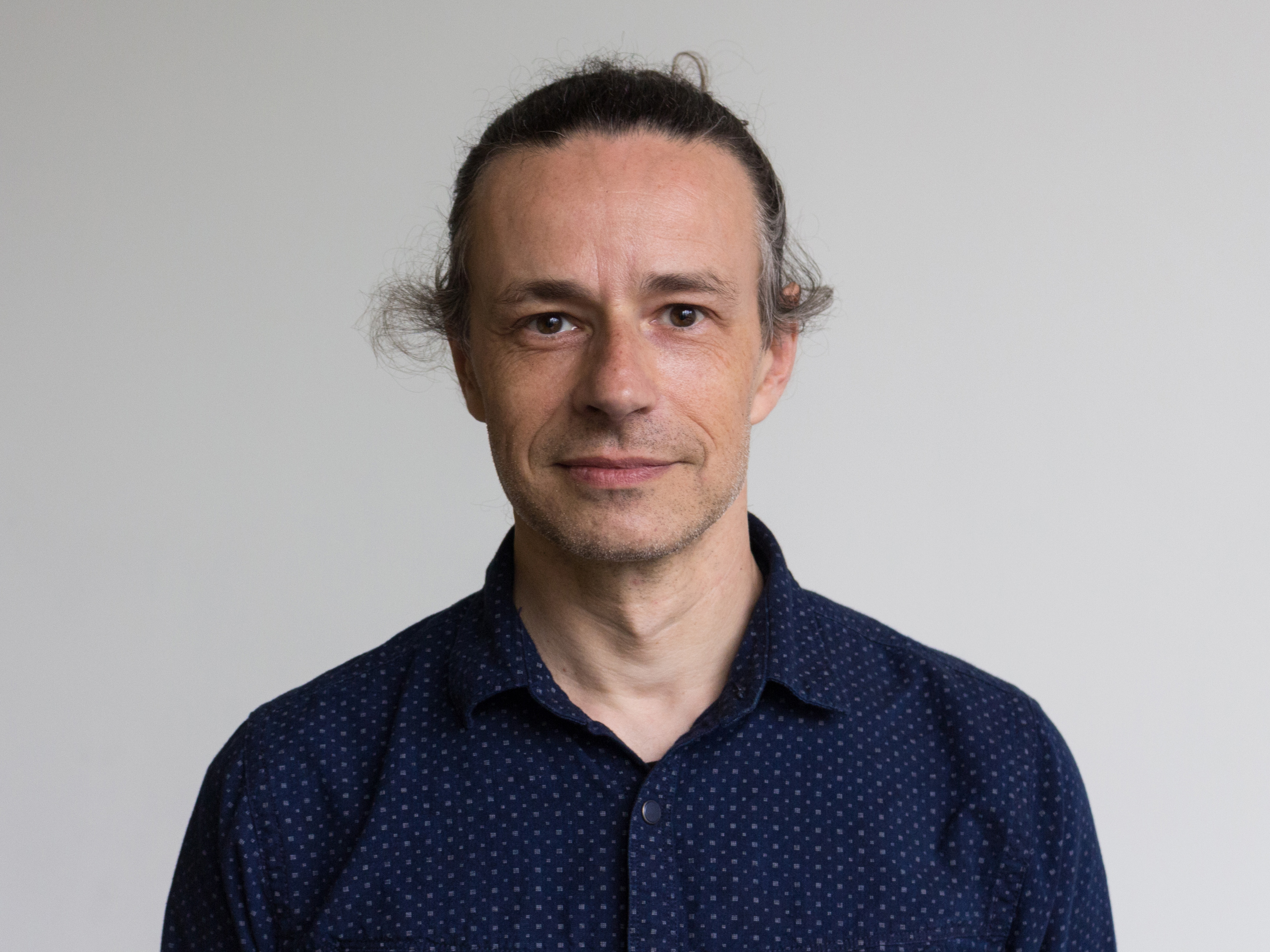
- Ron Regé, Jr. at the Art Gallery of Western Australia in April 2016.
- Born: Ronald M. Regé Jr. December 5, 1969 (age 56) Quincy, Massachusetts, U.S.
- Areas: Cartoonist, Musician
- Notable works: Skibber Bee Bye; The Cartoon Utopia; Halcyon

Ron Regé Jr. (born December 5, 1969, in Quincy, Massachusetts) is an American alternative cartoonist and musician.

He has published a number of graphic novels and was a regular contributor to the Kramers Ergot anthology; his work has also been published by McSweeney's and in other languages by numerous European imprints. His illustrations have appeared in The New York Times and the National Post. As a musician, he has recorded and performed with such bands as Swirlies and Lavender Diamond.

== Biography ==
=== Early life and education ===
Regé grew up in Quincy and Plymouth, Massachusetts, and attended the Massachusetts College of Art and Design. According to Lambiek Comiclopedia, "after ... working in a copy shop for several years, he relocated to Northern California."

=== Comics ===
Regé first began publishing his work in minicomics form in 1988 while attending college. In the early 1990s, Regé drew a comic every day, many of which he published in his annual periodical Yeast Hoist (later collected by Highwater Books in 2003). During this period, he also contributed illustrations to DIY publications, and designed posters for events, as well as various forms of apparel. Many of these pieces, as well as some of Regé's more commercial work, are anthologized in the collection Against Pain (Drawn & Quarterly 2008).

By the late 1990s Regé's work was picked up by Tom Devlin of Highwater Books, and when that publisher folded, moved with Devlin to Drawn & Quarterly. Regé's first graphic novel, Skibber Bee Bye (Highwater Books, 1999), a surreal "...dreamscape in which a shy and lovesick elephant furtively pursues the company of two reclusive mice," was praised by Chris Ware: "Ron Regé is one of a handful of cartoonists in the history of the medium not only to reinvent comics to suit his own idiosyncratic impulses and inspirations as an artist, but also to imbue it with his own peculiar, ever-changing emotional energy. To me, he is unquestionably one of 'the greats.'"

Regé and Joan Reidy's story "Boys" was included in The Anthology of Graphic Fiction, Cartoons, and True Stories edited by Ivan Brunetti and published by Yale University Press in 2006.

After publishing a number of comics/graphic novels with Drawn & Quarterly, in 2008, Regé's focus changed. As he described his journey:

"I did a week residency in Vancouver Island. And a residency in Montreal, in 2008.... I was frustrated with comics. Didn’t know what I wanted to do anymore. Didn’t want to draw regular comic strips. Didn’t have any ideas for characters, stories... Oh, I’m DONE. I’m not going to draw comics anymore. I’m done with comic strips, I’m done with narrative."

What resulted was The Cartoon Utopia, published by Fantagraphics in 2012:

"The Cartoon Utopia is a sort of esoteric textbook. By 'esoteric' I don’t mean mysterious or abstract. Although it is these things, I am referring to Alchemy, Hermeticism, the ancient knowledge that forms the basis of all spiritual belief systems.... My work has always had a philosophical, spiritual sense of yearning and pondering to it.... There are things that I have intrinsically understood as true my entire life. The more I explored the esoteric, the more I recognized things I have always known.... Well, I guess The Cartoon Utopia is a bit like 'Alchemy for Dummies' or something. Comics can convey complicated and unwieldy information in a clear, concise way by distilling the information down to its essence. Just like Alchemy!"

=== Music ===
Regé played drums and trombone in his high school band. He continued to tinker with music in college and built a variety of instruments for a course in art school. Bits of Regé's 4-track home recordings appeared on releases by the Boston indie rock band Swirlies, and more extensively in various related lo-fi projects with friends. Regé appears on releases by the Yes Girls and the Mystical Unionists; he later played drums in the Los Angeles-based group Lavender Diamond (for which he has contributed artwork to the band's various releases).

== Themes and art style ==
Regé's work is frequently engaged with themes of spiritualism and "ancient wisdom."

His artwork, which is dense and deliberately childlike, has often been classified as "cute brut". According to publisher Drawn & Quarterly, "Regé creates his own visual poetry that sets him apart from other cartoonists as one of the most original artists to enter the medium in the past decade. His storytelling is neither linear nor altogether accessible; however, his recognizable thin line and cute characters draw you into a dreamlike, sensitive fantasy world that, as odd as it seems, is entirely realistic." In a 2017 interview, Regé described his artistic influences and style this way: "I was probably influenced by my friends. I guess if you put Marc Bell and John Porcellino together it equals me."

== Personal life ==
According to his publisher Fantagraphics, Regé lives in Echo Park, Los Angeles.

== Exhibitions ==
- 2007 "UnInked: Paintings, Sculpture and Graphic Work by Five Cartoonists" (Phoenix Art Museum, Phoenix, Arizona) — group exhibition guest-curated by Chris Ware, also featuring Kim Deitch, Jerry Moriarty, Gary Panter, and Seth

== Awards ==
Regé's story "Silent Introduction" (translated into German as "Stumme Einleitung") was published in Reprodukt's anthology Orang #7 - Das Ende der Welt, which in 2009 was given an ICOM Independent Comic Preis for Sonderpreis der Jury für eine bemerkenswerte Comicpublikation ("Special Jury Prize for a Remarkable Comic Publication").

His work was also included in Drawn & Quarterly: Twenty-Five Years of Contemporary Cartooning, Comics, and Graphic Novels, which won the 2016 Eisner Award for Best Anthology.

=== Nominations ===
- 1998 Ignatz Award for Promising New Talent (for Skibber Bee Bye)
- 2000 (with Joan Leidy) Ignatz Award for Outstanding Comic (for Boys)
- 2002 Ignatz Award for Outstanding Story (for "Wir Mussën Wissen, Wir Werden Wissen (We Must Know, We Will Know)", Drawn & Quarterly volume 4)
- 2009 Ignatz Award for Outstanding Anthology or Collection (for Against Pain)
- 2022 Ignatz Award for Outstanding Artist (for Halcyon)

== Bibliography ==
- The Dum Dum Posse Reader (Nib Comics, 1994)
- Skibber Bee Bye (self-published, 1997)
  - expanded and published by Highwater Books, 1999; re-released by Drawn & Quarterly, 2006 ISBN 978-1896597966
  - Spanish-language edition (Apa-Apa, 2010)
  - French-language edition (Delphine, 2012)
- (with Joan Leidy) Boys (Highwater Books, 1999)
- Yeast Hoist: Does Music Make You Cry? (Highwater Books, 2003) ISBN 978-1932510003
- The Awake Field (Drawn & Quarterly, 2006) ISBN 978-1896597973
- Scituate Heart (Drawn & Quarterly, 2007) ISBN 978-1897299258
- Against Pain (Drawn & Quarterly, 2008) ISBN 978-1897299296
- The Cartoon Utopia (Fantagraphics, 2012) ISBN 978-1606995969
- Weaver Festival Phenomenon (Fantagraphics, 2016) ISBN 978-1683961604 — adaptation of Banana Yoshimoto's short prose story "Moonlight Shadow"
- What Parsifal Saw (Fantagraphics, 2017) ISBN 978-1606999929
- Halcyon (Fantagraphics, 2022) ISBN 978-1683965114
- Shell Collection (Fantagraphics, 2024) ISBN 978-1683969747 — compendium of comics and drawings from the first 75 issues of Regé's minicomics series, The Shell of the Self of the Senses

== See also ==
- Marc Bell
- Fort Thunder
- Manly P. Hall
- Gary Panter
- John Porcellino
- Brian Ralph
- Royal Robertson
- Jim Woodring
