= Paper Rad =

American art collective

- Screenshot from Paper Rad's Facemaker video (2005).

Background information
- Origin: Pittsburgh, Pennsylvania and Providence, Rhode Island
- Years active: 2000–2008
- Website: paperrad.org

Paper Rad was an art collective from approx. 2000 until 2008, based on the East Coast in Pittsburgh, Pennsylvania and Providence, Rhode Island in the United States. Known for creating comics, zines, video art, net art, MIDI files, paintings, installations, and music with a distinct "lo-fi" aesthetic often associated with underground culture or 1990s "retro tech", juxtaposed images and featuring bright colors.

== History ==
The three primary members were Jacob Ciocci, Jessica Ciocci, and Ben Jones, but additionally included many others such as Paul Bright, David Wightman, Sonja Radovancevic, Extreme Animals, and others.

Prior to Paper Rad, Ben Jones and Christopher Forgues (C.F.) were students at Massachusetts College of Art and Design and created a zine project called "Paper Radio". Jacob and his sister Jessica became active in Paper Rad after moving to Boston and hanging out with Joe Grillo, Ben Jones, and Christopher Forgues. All of them were interested in zine making, experimental art and music, and computers, which opened up the possibility of multimedia work. The first Paper Rad animation video was made in Boston on VHS tape. The early collaborators for Paper Rad included Andrew Warren, Joe Grillo, Laura Grant, and Billy Grant (and later the Grant siblings with Joe Grillo formed the art collective, Dearraindrop).

Paper Rad exhibited works at several major galleries including PaceWildenstein, The New Museum of Contemporary Art, and Deitch Projects. Paper Rad's work (featuring Ben Jones) is included in the permanent museum collection at Princeton University Art Museum.

The collective published a book in late-2005, Paper Rad, BJ and da Dogs and a DVD in 2006 on Load Records (Trash Talking). Paper Rad's video works are distributed by Electronic Arts Intermix.

== Style ==
Paper Rad calls its style "Dogman 99", a play on the Danish filmmaking movement Dogme 95. According to one of its project websites, the rules of Dogman 99 are: "No Wacom tablet, no scanning, pure RGB colors only, only fake tweening, and as many alpha tricks as possible".

Paper Rad's visual projects often employ bright fluorescent palettes juxtaposed with primary colors to create a distinctive "lo fi" look. It adopts a variety of techniques and elements to achieve this look, including pop art, collage, punk art, as well as imagery from popular culture. The multimedia projects incorporate MIDI audio, poor recordings of original sound effects and voices, pixelization, and other crude audio and visual components. Paper Rad recycled or appropriated obscure sounds and images from a variety of sources, including old cartoons, commercials, and late-night television.

In the early 2000s Paper Rad's website featured early GIF art as well as a maze of linked images in the "Dogman 99" style.

== Collaborations & other works ==
=== Super Mario Bros. Movie ===
Paper Rad collaborated with multi-media artist Cory Arcangel to make Super Mario Bros. Movie, a 15-minute video piece about the life and times of Nintendo's Mario. The piece consisted of a hacked Nintendo Entertainment System video-game cartridge where the backgrounds and scenarios were altered and rearranged into a narrative story about the game world becoming corrupted and Mario's existential crises about being a video game character. The movie debuted at Deitch Projects in New York in 2005.

=== Wyld File ===
Wyld File consisted of the duo Ben Jones and Jacob Ciocci, in collaboration with Eric Mast (better known as E*ROCK). Wyld File is a commercial entity that makes lo-fi music videos for artists like Islands, The Gossip ("Standing in the Way of Control"), and Beck ("Gameboy Homeboy").
