= John Pham =

Cartoonist, animator, comic creator, and art director

- Born: Saigon
- Occupation: Comic creator

John Pham (cartoonist) is a cartoonist, animator, comic creator, and art director based in Los Angeles, California.

Pham was born in Saigon but was raised in the United States. He received a self publishing grant from the Xeric Foundation in 2000 for "Epoxy." Pham's comic Sublife Volume 1 was published by Fantagraphics Books in 2008. Sublife Volume 2, also published by Fantagraphics, was nominated for an Outstanding Artist, Outstanding Series, and Outstanding Comic at the 2010 Ignatz Awards Deep Space and St. Ambrose, excerpts from Pham's Sublife comic, were anthologized in the 2010 and 2011 editions of The Best American Comics. He was interviewed in issue 259 of The Comics Journal. He also contributed a story to volume 7 of the acclaimed anthology, Kramers Ergot.

"Living Space", a solo show of Pham's paintings and sculptures was held by GR2, Los Angeles, in April 2010, In 2011, Pham worked as a designer on Ben Jones' The Problem Solverz series for Cartoon Network. That year, he was also a featured international guest (representing the US) at the Angoulême comics festival in France.

Pham has worked as art director for Cartoon Network's OK K.O.! Let's Be Heroes and Netflix Animation's Battle Kitty.
