= Patience (graphic novel) =

2016 graphic novel by Daniel Clowes

- Creator: Daniel Clowes
- Date: 2016
- Page count: 180 pages
- Publisher: Fantagraphics
- ISBN: 978-1606999059

Chronology
- Preceded by: The Death-Ray
- Followed by: Monica

Patience (2016) is a graphic novel by Daniel Clowes, published by Fantagraphics. A science-fiction love story about time travel, it describes the misadventures of a man, Jack, after he finds his pregnant wife, Patience, murdered in their apartment. Many years later, when grief has destroyed his life, chance leads him to discover a time machine, which he plans to use to save Patience.

The book's tagline, in a surreal and tongue-in-cheek style typical of Clowes, is "a cosmic timewarp deathtrip to the primordial infinite of everlasting love". The book uses bright, contrasting colors to evoke atmosphere, as well as surrealistic sci-fi imagery when Jack free-falls between dimensions and has nightmarish visions of himself outside time and space. (Clowes's visual approach in his graphic novels tends to vary between full, even gaudy color, and muted blues and greens that create a black-and-white effect, as in Ghost World and David Boring.)

== Background and creation ==
Patience is Clowes's longest book, at around 180 pages, and his second, after Wilson, to not have been serialized first, either in Eightball—his own comic book series—or elsewhere. Clowes credits Alvin Buenaventura for technical and production assistance. Buenaventura died by suicide in February 2016, the month before Patience's release.

== Film adaptation ==
On December 13, 2016, Clowes announced that he would write a film adaptation of Patience for Focus Features. While promoting Wilson, he spoke about how, unlike his previous adaptations, Patience is about the right length for a screenplay, saying: "It's interesting—I thought that I was going to have to chop stuff, which would be the first time. Usually I'm having to add material. But it's actually turning out to be the right length in the way I conceived it, so that's one of those things you never know when you start. It's magically working out in that way, so I take that as a good sign."
