= Wilson (comics) =

2010 graphic novel by Daniel Clowes

- Cover to the first edition of Wilson
- Date: 2010
- Page count: 80 pages
- Publisher: Drawn & Quarterly

Creative team
- Creator: Daniel Clowes

Chronology
- Preceded by: Ice Haven
- Followed by: Mister Wonderful

Wilson is a satirical graphic novel by American cartoonist Daniel Clowes, published in 2010 by Drawn & Quarterly. Starring the misanthropic Wilson, the book is structured as 70 one-page gag strips, with days or even years passing between the strips. Clowes says, "The story is really what you interpret happens in between each strip." The middle-aged, divorced Wilson, who lives in Oakland, California, finds himself lonely, smug, and obsessed with his past. He is condescending and supercilious, and insists on communicating his alienating dissatisfactions with all those he meets, even with strangers, and most often unsolicited.

== Overview ==
The style of artwork changes from strip to strip, sometimes in Clowes' familiar tight drawing style, sometimes more exaggeratedly cartoony. The story is told in one-page segments that can be read individually, while creating a larger whole. It was printed with extremely thick and heavy cover boards. Wilson was the first book Clowes had published without first serializing it the way Ghost World and David Boring had first appeared in his comic book Eightball.

Wilson was inspired by a combination of spending time with his father, who was in the hospital with a terminal condition, while also reading a biography of Charles Schulz. Clowes says his father and Schulz were alike in many ways, in physical and personality terms. Clowes brought his sketchbook with him to the hospital, and there came up with the concept of Wilson and sketches of some of the strips that would end up in the final book. Clowes later described the character as "a guy I could put into any situation, and I would hear his voice and he would tell me what to write."

The book was optioned by director Alexander Payne in a deal that would have Clowes writing the screenplay. However, Payne stated in a Parade interview dated February 24, 2014 that he was no longer involved with the project.

The project was taken over by Fox Searchlight, and Wilson was filmed in Minneapolis/St. Paul, Minnesota in the summer of 2015, with Craig Johnson directing and Payne remaining on board as a producer. Woody Harrelson starred in the title role, and the film was released in 2017.

== Bibliography ==
- CBR News staff (13 April 2011). "Clowes is "Mister Wonderful"". Comic Book Resources. Archived from the original on 2011-04-14.
- Gleiberman, Owen (22 January 2017). "Sundance Film Review 'Wilson'". Variety.
- Hartlaub, Peter (18 May 2010). "Daniel Clowes' 'Wilson' draws from darker side". San Francisco Chronicle. p. E-1.
- KARE 11 Staff (2 June 2015). "Calling all actors: 'Wilson' to begin filming this summer in Minnesota". KARE – via Reno Gazette Journal.
- Kit, Boris (27 May 2015). "Woody Harrelson's Comic Adaptation 'Wilson' Comes Together With Laura Dern Co-Starring (Exclusive)". The Hollywood Reporter.
- Lipsyte, Sam (2 July 2010). "Dyspeptic Living". The New York Times.
- McKittrick, Christopher (23 March 2017). "Wilson: A Walking Id". Creative Screenwriting.
- Neumyer, Scott (24 February 2014). "Nebraska Director Alexander Payne Talks Bruce Dern and the Iconic Look of Black and White". Parade.
- Weldon, Glen (30 April 2010). "The Life And Trials Of A Full-Tilt Cartoon Misanthrope". National Public Radio.
