= OK Soda =

Experimental soft drink

- Type: Soft drink
- Manufacturer: The Coca-Cola Company
- Distributor: Coca-Cola Enterprises, others
- Origin: United States
- Introduced: April 20, 1994; 32 years ago
- Discontinued: September 1995; 31 years ago
- Flavor: Cola
- Related products: Coca-Cola

OK Soda is a discontinued soft drink introduced in 1994 by The Coca-Cola Company. It courted the American Generation X demography with unusual advertising tactics, including neo-noir design, chain letters, and deliberately negative publicity. After the soda did not sell well in select test markets, it was officially declared out of production in 1995 before reaching nationwide distribution. The drink's slogan was "Things are going to be OK."

== History ==
In 1993, The Coca-Cola Company CEO Roberto Goizueta rehired Sergio Zyman to be the chief of marketing for all Coca-Cola beverage brands, a surprising choice given that Zyman had worked closely with the New Coke campaign, possibly the largest marketing failure in Coke's history. However, after revamping the can design and print advertising campaigns for Diet Coke and Coca-Cola Classic with great success, Zyman was given free rein to design new products with aggressive, offbeat marketing campaigns.

International market research done by The Coca-Cola Company in the late 1980s revealed that "Coke" was the second most recognizable word across all languages in the world, second only to the word "OK". Zyman (who also conceived Fruitopia) decided to take advantage of this existing brand potential and created a soft drink with this name. He conceived of a counter-intuitive advertising campaign that intentionally targeted people who did not like advertising. He predicted that the soft drink would be a huge success, and promised Goizueta that the soft drink would take at least 4% of the US beverage market. Coca-Cola's special projects manager Brian Lanahan explained to Time magazine that they chose the name "OK" because "It underpromises. It doesn't say, 'This is the next great thing.' It's the flip side of overclaiming." Coca-Cola marketing consultant Tom Pinko told National Public Radio, "People who are 19 years old are very accustomed to having been manipulated and knowing that they're manipulated," and that OK Soda's audience possessed a "lethargy [that] probably can't be penetrated by any commercial message."

=== Testing ===
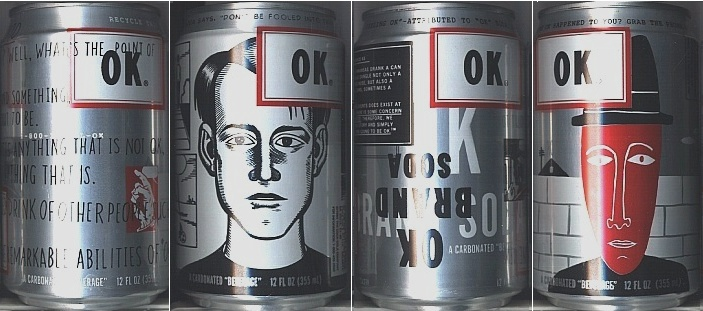
The original four cans used in test markets

OK Soda was introduced by The Coca-Cola Company on April 20, 1994. Despite a nationwide advertising campaign and intense media attention, it was only marketed in select areas, representing different demographics, during the summer of 1994. Four separate can designs were used, with each test market getting all four designs. The Coca-Cola Company announced at the time that they would continually update the cans with new designs (later designs can be identified by having an explanatory tag saying that it is "A unique fruity soda"). Some of the testing locations were:

- Atlantic Canada
- Austin, Texas
- Boston, Massachusetts
- Denver, Colorado
- Colorado Springs, Colorado
- Cincinnati, Ohio
- Detroit, Michigan
- Fargo, North Dakota
- Knoxville, Tennessee
- Little Rock, Arkansas
- Lynden, Washington
- Minneapolis-St. Paul, Minnesota
- Northern Wisconsin
- Oklahoma City, Oklahoma
- Omaha, Nebraska
- Portland, Oregon
- Providence, Rhode Island
- Sacramento, California
- Seattle, Washington

OK Soda never captured more than 3% of the beverage market in any of the target locations, failing to match Zyman's hype. The project was canceled by Coca-Cola in September 1995, just a year after its introduction, and the soda was never widely released to the public.

== Marketing ==
One of the OK Soda can designs, illustrated by Charles Burns

OK Soda has been remembered more for its unique advertising campaign than for its fruity flavor. The name and advertising campaign attempted to poke fun at the "I'm OK – You're OK" pop-psychology of the early 1970s. OK Soda was intentionally marketed at the difficult Generation X markets, and attempted to cash in on the group's existing cynicism, disillusionment, and disaffection with standard advertising campaigns. OK Soda's concept was that the youth market was already aware that they were being manipulated by mass media marketing, so this advertising campaign would just be more transparent about it. Its indirect advertising was a form of rebel advertising similar to the McDonald's commercials for the Arch Deluxe. The campaign was designed by Portland, Oregon-based advertising firm Wieden+Kennedy. Spokespeople for the company and their advertisers were very frank about the fact that they were marketing the drink entirely on the "feeling" rather than the taste. OK Soda's own advertisements went so far as to disparage the beverage's taste, comparing it to things like "carbonated tree sap".

The general public did not respond to the offbeat campaign, and most critics point out that the campaigning was too overt in its courting of the youth and teen market.

=== Can design ===
Both the cans and the print advertisements for the soft drink, created by Wieden+Kennedy creative director Charlotte Moore, conceptual artist Peter Wegner, and designer Todd Waterbury, featured work by popular "alternative" cartoonists Daniel Clowes (Eightball, Ghost World) and Charles Burns (Black Hole, The Believer), as well as work from illustrator Calef Brown. Though skeptical of the campaign, Clowes took the job because his work illustrating a couple of cans and a few posters paid more than publishing five books of comics. In an act of subverting OK Soda's already subversive marketing scheme, Clowes gave his OK Soda mascot the facial features of Charles Manson, saying that none of the contracts he signed said, "Don't put a mass murderer on the can."

Unlike the brightly colored Coca-Cola cans, OK Soda cans were decorated in drab shades of gray with occasional red text. In addition to the primarily two-tone illustrations, the cans featured a special code that could be entered at the toll-free number "1-800-I-FEEL-OK" that led callers through a series of true-or-false prompts inspired by the Minnesota Multiphasic Personality Inventory. Cans also sported a "Coincidence" in the form of an odd OK Soda-themed urban legend set in various towns around the United States, each anecdote ending with the statement "This is a coincidence." OK Soda's marketing team also mailed out these "Coincidences" in the form of chain letters to promote the soda, and in turn these chain letters were read on TV spots for OK Soda.

=== Prize can ===
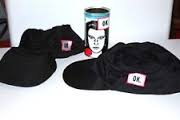
An OK Soda prize can with prizes

Randomly included with OK Soda selections in vending machines was an OK Soda "prize can". Similar to a can of instant soup, the top could be peeled completely off, revealing the prize inside. Prizes included some form of OK Soda merchandise rolled up to fit inside the can (usually a hat) and an additional two quarters to purchase another can of OK Soda. The design of the prize can was different from the others, and represented a fifth design overall. It was also more cylindrical in shape, considerably lighter (without soda inside), and included a light-blue banner, the only such design to include this color. This program was similar to Coke's previous MagiCan campaign.

=== Manifesto ===
Excerpts from the OK Soda manifesto, written by associate creative director Peter Wegner, were printed on the cans, and were also available for a short while on OK Soda's website. Some of the sayings were:

- What's the point of OK? Well, what's the point of anything?
- OK Soda emphatically rejects anything that is not OK, and fully supports anything that is.
- The better you understand something, the more OK it turns out to be.
- OK Soda says, "Don't be fooled into thinking there has to be a reason for everything."
- OK Soda reveals the surprising truth about people and situations.
- OK Soda does not subscribe to any religion, or endorse any political party, or do anything other than feel OK.
- There is no real secret to feeling OK.
- OK Soda may be the preferred drink of other people such as yourself.
- Never overestimate the remarkable abilities of "OK" brand soda.
- Please wake up every morning knowing that things are going to be OK.

== Composition and taste ==
OK Soda had a more "citric" taste than traditional colas, almost like a fruit punch version of Coke's Fresca. It has been described as "slightly spicy" and likened to a combination of orange soda and flat Coca-Cola.

=== Ingredients ===
Carbonated water, high fructose corn syrup and/or sucrose, citric acid, caramel color, potassium benzoate (to protect taste), phosphoric acid, acacia, natural flavors, potassium citrate, caffeine, dipotassium phosphate, glycerol ester of wood rosin, brominated vegetable oil, Red 40

== Legacy ==
After its production ceased, OK Soda enjoyed a cult following on the internet, including the use of a newsgroup at alt.fan.ok-soda, which was fairly active for several years. Fans would reminisce about the offbeat advertising materials, sell merchandise and intact cans, and trade recipes for home-brewed OK Soda facsimiles.

While OK Soda appears on retrospective lists of failed soft drinks and fluke ad campaigns, analyst Thomas Flight posits that the soda may have been "ahead of its time" in its attempts at "brand disillusionment" through its subversion of traditional marketing. For example, Liquid Death has used similar "lifestyle play" marketing techniques with great success. Meanwhile, OK Soda's original merchandise, cans, and advertising material can still be found readily on eBay, with asking prices sometimes in hundreds of U.S. dollars.

== See also ==
- Arch Deluxe
- Crystal Pepsi
- List of defunct consumer brands
- Pepsi One
