= Art School Confidential (comics) =

Four-page comic by Daniel Clowes

"Art School Confidential" is a four-page black-and-white comic by Daniel Clowes. It originally appeared in issue #7 (November 1991) of Clowes's comic book Eightball and was later reprinted in the book collections Orgy Bound and Twentieth Century Eightball. It inspired the 2006 film of the same name. A color version of the comic was included in the published version of Clowes's original screenplay for the film.

The comic is a satire of American art schools, presented in the manner of a sensationalistic exposé and ostensibly based on Clowes's own experiences at the Pratt Institute. (The story is signed "By D. Clowes, B.F.A." and a Pratt Institute diploma appears on a wall in one panel.)

According to Clowes in a 2006 interview, "Art School Confidential" was

literally something where I had four pages left (in Eightball 7) and I had to turn the issue in. I said, "Well, I'll do something about art school that will amuse my 10 friends who went." I really thought nobody else would comment on it or even notice. As it turned out, every single one of my readers was either in art school or had some affiliation with it. They all responded overwhelmingly (and) were all certain I had gone to the same art school they had. The story took on a life of its own for a while.… People would Xerox it and put it up on the bulletin board at school. Somebody else would take it from there and Xerox it again. There were rumors that it had been Xeroxed so many times that nobody could discern the art style anymore. It became a kind of folk art.

The "tampon-in-a-teacup trick" referred to in "Art School Confidential" appeared in the 2001 film version of Clowes's graphic novel Ghost World.

== Quotes ==
- "If you must go to art school for God's sake make the most of it ... Seldom if ever again in life will you be afforded the chance to scrutinize such an array of losers in an environment that actually encourages their most pretentious inclinations!"
- "Remember, the only piece of paper less valuable than one of your paintings is a B.F.A. degree."
