= The Sensual Santa =

One-page comic strip by Daniel Clowes

- The Sensual Santa
- Author: Daniel Clowes
- Genre: comic strip
- Publication date: 1994

"The Sensual Santa" is a one-page comic strip by Daniel Clowes. It originally appeared in Eightball #14 (published in October 1994) and was reprinted in the Clowes collections Orgy Bound and Twentieth Century Eightball.

The comic's titular character is a pudgy, blond, bearded middle-aged man wearing a pink tank top and a lavender cap. He introduces himself in the story's first panel while perched at the top of a chimney in the middle of the night, in the manner of Santa Claus:

"Why wait for a holiday? The spirit of giving sensuality is in season all year 'round! Come and join me on my rounds... maybe we can both learn something!"

In the ensuing panels The Sensual Santa invades several homes and administers hugs, cuddling and backrubs with cinnamon body oil to unsuspecting people, who react to his "gifts" variously with alarm, puzzlement or numbed resignation. All the while, and totally oblivious to his recipients' evident discomfort, he delivers a cheerful monologue on the virtues of sharing sensuality that parodies the sensibility and prose style of books such as The Joy of Sex. The final panel shows The Sensual Santa holding a surprised-looking elderly woman in the middle of a bubble bath while exhorting his audience to "Be a Sensual Santa! It's contagious!"

The bottom of the panel contains a parting message from the author: "I hereby apologize to each and every reader. - D. Clowes."

Peter Bagge alludes to "The Sensual Santa" in a comic he drew for Reason magazine.
