= Caricature (disambiguation) =

A caricature is a description of a person using exaggeration of some characteristics and oversimplification of others

Caricature or Caricatures may also refer to:

- Caricature (Daniel Clowes collection), a 1998 book collection of nine comic short stories by Daniel Clowes
- Caricatures (Ange album)
- Caricatures (Donald Byrd album)
- La Caricature (1830–1843), a satirical weekly published in Paris between 1830 and 1843 during the July Monarchy
- La Caricature (1880–1904), a satirical journal that was published in Paris between 1880 and 1904
