= New Coke =

1985 reformulation of Coca-Cola

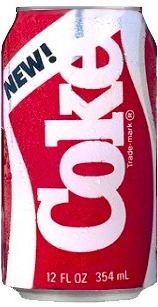
- A can of New Coke
- Product type: Cola
- Current owner: The Coca-Cola Company
- Country: United States
- Introduced: April 23, 1985
- Discontinued: July 2002; 24 years ago

New Coke was the informal name given to a reformulated version of the soft drink Coca-Cola, introduced by the Coca-Cola Company in the United States in April 1985. It was renamed Coke II in 1990 and was discontinued in July 2002. By 1985, Coca-Cola had been losing market share to diet soft drinks and non-cola beverages for several years. Blind taste tests indicated that consumers preferred the sweeter taste of rival Pepsi-Cola, leading the company to reformulate its product.

The change was met with widespread negative public reaction, and New Coke came to be regarded as a significant marketing failure. Within three months, the Coca-Cola Company reintroduced the original formula under the name "Coca-Cola Classic", which produced a notable increase in sales. The reversal prompted speculation that the formula change had been a deliberate strategy to revive interest in the original product, an interpretation the company has consistently disputed. The episode generated lasting discussion about brand identity and consumer attachment, and gave rise to several conspiracy theories regarding the company's motives. Analyses of the taste-test methodology used during the product's development have also been a subject of ongoing debate.

New Coke was briefly reintroduced in 2019 in limited quantities as a promotional tie-in for the Netflix series Stranger Things. New Coke is widely cited as a cautionary tale about the risks of altering a well-established and successful brand.

== Background ==
After World War II, Coca-Cola held 60 percent of the market share for cola. By 1983, it had declined to under 24 percent, largely because of competition from Pepsi-Cola. Pepsi had begun to outsell Coke in supermarkets; Coke maintained its lead only through venues such as soda vending machines and fast food restaurants, especially McDonald's.

Market analysts believed baby boomers were more likely to purchase diet drinks as they aged and became health- and weight-conscious. Growth in the full-calorie segment would come from younger drinkers, who at that time favored Pepsi by increasing margins. Meanwhile, the overall market for colas steadily declined in the early 1980s, as consumers increasingly purchased diet and non-cola soft drinks, many of which were sold by Coca-Cola. This further eroded Coca-Cola's market share. When Roberto Goizueta became Coca-Cola CEO in 1980, he told employees there would be no "sacred cows" in how the company did business, including how it formulated its drinks.

== Development ==
Coca-Cola's senior executives commissioned a secret project headed by marketing vice president Sergio Zyman and Coca-Cola USA president Brian Dyson to create a new flavor for Coke. This project was named "Project Kansas", from a photo of Kansas journalist William Allen White drinking a Coke; the image had been used extensively in Coca-Cola advertising and hung on several executives' walls.

The sweeter cola overwhelmingly beat both regular Coke and Pepsi in taste tests, surveys, and focus groups. The southeastern United States, one of Coca-Cola's strongest and most reliable markets, narrowly preferred the new flavor; this preference widened once the testers revealed the new taste was also a Coca-Cola product. One bottling company was so impressed with the new formula, it threatened to sue the company if it did not put the drink on the market.

Asked if they would buy and drink the product if it were Coca-Cola, most testers said they would, although it would take a while for them to get used to it. About 10–12 percent of testers felt angry and alienated at the thought and said they might stop drinking Coke. Their presence in focus groups tended to negatively skew results as they exerted indirect peer pressure on other participants.

The surveys, which were given more significance by standard marketing procedures of the era, were less negative than the taste tests and were key in convincing management to change the formula in 1985, to coincide with the drink's centenary. However, the groups had provided a clue as to how the change would play out in the public, a finding the company downplayed. Management rejected an idea to make and sell the new flavor as a separate variety of Coca-Cola. The company's bottlers had already been complaining about absorbing other additions into the product line following the introduction of Diet Coke in 1982; Cherry Coke was launched in the United States, almost simultaneously with New Coke during 1985. Many bottling companies had sued the company over syrup pricing policies. A new variety of Coke in competition with the main variety could also have cannibalized Coke's sales and increased the proportion of Pepsi drinkers relative to Coke drinkers. Early in his career with Coca-Cola, Goizueta had been in charge of the Bahamas subsidiary. He had improved sales by tweaking the drink's flavor slightly and so was receptive to the idea that changing the flavor of Coke could boost profits. He believed it would be "New Coke or no Coke", and that the change must take place openly. He insisted that the containers carry the "New!" label, which gave the drink its popular name.

Goizueta made a visit to his mentor and predecessor as the company's chief executive, the ailing Robert W. Woodruff, who had built Coca-Cola into an international brand following World War II. Goizueta claimed he had secured Woodruff's blessing for the reformulation, but many of Goizueta's closest friends within the company doubted that the elderly Woodruff fully understood Goizueta's intentions. Woodruff died at age 95 in March 1985, a month before New Coke was launched.

== Launch ==
New Coke was introduced on April 23, 1985. Production of the original formulation ended later that week. In many areas, New Coke was initially sold in original Coke packaging; bottlers used up remaining cans, cartons and labels before new packaging became widely available. Old cans containing New Coke were identified by their gold colored tops, while glass and plastic bottles were given red caps, instead of silver or white, respectively. Bright yellow stickers indicating the change were placed on the cartons of multi-packs.

The press conference at New York City's Lincoln Center to introduce the new formula did not go well. Reporters had already been fed questions by Pepsi, which was worried that New Coke would erase its gains. Goizueta, Coca-Cola's CEO, described the new flavor as "bolder", "rounder", and "more harmonious", and he defended the change by saying that the drink's secret formula was not sacrosanct and inviolable. As far back as 1935, Coca-Cola sought kosher certification from Atlanta rabbi Tobias Geffen and made two changes to the formula so the drink could be considered kosher (as well as halal and vegetarian). Goizueta also refused to admit that taste tests had led the change, calling it "one of the easiest decisions we've ever made". When a reporter asked whether Diet Coke would also be reformulated "assuming [New Coke] is a success," Goizueta curtly replied, "No. And I didn't assume that this is a success. This is a success."

The emphasis on the new formula's sweeter taste also ran contrary to previous Coca-Cola advertising, in which spokesman Bill Cosby had touted the original Coke's less-sweet taste as a reason to prefer it over the sweeter taste of Pepsi. The Coca-Cola company's stock went up immediately after the announcement, and market research showed 80 percent of the American public was aware of the reformulation within days of the change.

=== Initial success ===
Coca-Cola introduced the new formula with marketing pushes in New York City, where workers renovating the Statue of Liberty for its centenary in 1986 were given free cans, and Washington, D.C., where thousands of cans were given away in Lafayette Park. As soon as New Coke was introduced, the formula was already available at McDonald's and other drink fountains in the United States. Sales figures from those cities and other areas where it had been introduced, such as Miami and Detroit, showed a reaction that went as the market research had predicted. In fact, Coke's sales were up 8 percent over the same period as the year before.

Most Coke drinkers resumed buying the new Coke at much the same level as they had the old one. Surveys indicated that the majority of regular Coke drinkers liked the new flavoring. Three quarters of the respondents said they would buy New Coke again. The big test, however, remained in the South, where Coca-Cola had been created and bottled.

=== Backlash ===
To hear some tell it, April 23, 1985, was a day that will live in marketing infamy ... spawning consumer angst the likes of which no business has ever seen.

— The Coca-Cola Company, on the New Coke announcement

Although New Coke had been accepted by many loyal Coca-Cola drinkers, many more resented the change, as had happened in the focus groups. Many critics were from the southern US states, some of whom considered Coca-Cola part of their regional identity. Some viewed the change through the prism of the Civil War as a surrender to the "Yankees" as PepsiCo, the manufacturer of Pepsi, is based in Purchase, New York.

In a Chicago Tribune story about reaction in the South, a professor at the University of Mississippi observed that "changing Coca-Cola is an intrusion on tradition" and thus would not be well received in that region. An Alabama resident wondered why the company had introduced the new flavor in New York; elsewhere in the state an Anniston Star columnist, noting Goizueta's Cuban origins, insinuated that the flavor change was a communist plot. The Atlanta Journal-Constitution found a majority of patrons at The Varsity, a popular local restaurant in that city, favored the old formula. "Why didn't they test anybody here?" the co-owner asked.

The company received over 40,000 calls and letters expressing anger or disappointment, including one letter, delivered to Goizueta, addressed to "Chief Dodo, the Coca-Cola Company". Another letter asked for his autograph, as the signature of "one of the dumbest executives in American business history" would likely become valuable in the future. The company hotline, 1-800-GET-COKE, received over 1,500 calls per day compared to around 400 before the change. A psychiatrist whom Coke had hired to listen in on calls told executives that many people sounded as if they were discussing the death of a family member.

There were critics of New Coke from outside the region. Chicago Tribune columnist Bob Greene wrote some widely reprinted pieces ridiculing the new flavor and expressing anger at Coke's executives for having changed it. Comedians and talk show hosts, including Johnny Carson and David Letterman, made regular jokes mocking the switch. Ads for New Coke were booed heavily when they appeared on the scoreboard at the Houston Astrodome. Even Fidel Castro, a longtime Coca-Cola drinker, contributed to the backlash, calling New Coke a sign of American capitalist decadence. Goizueta's father expressed similar misgivings to his son, who later recalled that it was the only time his father had agreed with Castro, whose regime he had fled Cuba to avoid.

Gay Mullins, a Seattle retiree looking to start a public relations firm with $120,000 of borrowed money, formed the Old Cola Drinkers of America on May 28 to lobby Coca-Cola to either reintroduce the old formula or sell it to someone else. His organization eventually received over 60,000 phone calls. He filed a class action lawsuit against the company (which was quickly dismissed by a judge who said he preferred the taste of Pepsi), while nevertheless expressing interest in securing the Coca-Cola Company as a client of his new firm should it reintroduce the old formula. In two informal blind taste tests, Mullins either failed to distinguish New Coke from old or expressed a preference for New Coke.

Despite ongoing resistance in the South, New Coke continued to do well in the rest of the country, particularly in the west. However, the executives were uncertain of how international markets would react. They met with international Coke bottlers in Monaco; to their surprise, the bottlers were not interested in selling New Coke. Zyman also heard doubts and skepticism from his relatives in Mexico, where New Coke was scheduled to be introduced later that summer, when he went there on vacation.

Goizueta stated that Coca-Cola employees who liked New Coke felt unable to speak up due to peer pressure, as had happened in the focus groups. Donald Keough, the Coca-Cola president and chief operating officer at the time, reported overhearing someone say at his country club that they liked New Coke, but they would be "damned if I'll let Coca-Cola know that".

=== Response by PepsiCo ===
PepsiCo took advantage of the situation, running ads in which a first-time Pepsi drinker exclaimed, "Now I know why Coke did it!" Even amidst consumer anger and several Pepsi ads mocking Coca-Cola's debacle, Pepsi actually gained very few long-term converts over Coke's switch, despite a 14 percent sales increase over the same month the previous year, the largest sales growth in the company's history. Coca-Cola's director of corporate communications, Carlton Curtis, realized over time that consumers were more upset about the withdrawal of the old formula than the taste of the new one.

Immediately following the announcement of Coca-Cola's change, Roger Enrico, director of PepsiCo's North American operations, took out a full page ad in The New York Times proclaiming PepsiCo the winner of the long-running "Cola Wars" and declared a company-wide holiday for employees on April 26, saying "By today's action, Coke had admitted that it's not the real thing." Since Coke officials were preoccupied over the weekend with preparations for the announcement, their PepsiCo counterparts had time to cultivate skepticism among reporters, sounding themes that would later come into play in the public discourse over the changed drink.

=== Company dissatisfaction ===
Behind the scenes, some Coca-Cola executives had quietly been arguing for a reintroduction of the old formula as early as May. By mid-June, when soft drink sales usually begin to rise, the numbers showed that New Coke was leveling among consumers. Executives feared social peer pressure was now affecting their bottom line. Many consumers even began trying to obtain original Coca-Cola from overseas markets, where New Coke had not yet been introduced, as domestic stocks of the old drink were exhausted. Due to some complaints about New Coke's taste, company chemists quietly reduced the acidity level of the new formula, allowing its sweetness to be better perceived (advertisements pointing to this change were prepared but never used).

In addition to public protests and boycotts following the introduction of New Coke, Coca-Cola faced concerns from its bottlers. Although bottlers initially expressed support for the change at an April 22 meeting at the Woodruff Arts Center, reactions to the product’s taste were more mixed Many anticipated difficulties in promoting a reformulated product that had previously been marketed as consistent and unchanging.

The 20 bottlers still suing the Coca-Cola company made much of the formula change in their legal arguments. In its defense, the company had argued when the suit was originally filed that the new formula was unique and different from Diet Coke, which justified different pricing policies from the latter; however, if the new formula was merely a high-fructose corn syrup (HFCS)-sweetened version of Diet Coke, the company could not argue the formula for New Coke was unique. Bottlers, especially in the South, were also tired of facing personal attacks over the change; many reported that some acquaintances and even friends and relatives had actually ostracized them or had expressed their displeasure over New Coke in other emotionally hurtful ways. On June 23, several of the bottlers voiced these complaints in a private meeting with Coca-Cola executives at the company's headquarters in Atlanta. With the Coca-Cola company fearing boycotts not only from consumers but also from its bottlers, talks about reintroducing the original formula moved from "if" to when.

The Coca-Cola board finally decided that enough was enough and in early July, plans were set in motion to resume production of original Coca-Cola. Company president Donald Keough revealed years later, in the documentary The People vs. Coke (2002), that they realized this was the only correct thing to do after visiting a small restaurant in Monaco and the owner proudly said they served "the real thing, it's a real Coke", offering them a chilled 6.5 oz. glass bottle of original Coca-Cola.

=== Reversal and return ===
On July 11, 1985, Coca-Cola executives held a press conference and announced the return of the original Coca-Cola formula, 79 days after New Coke's introduction. Peter Jennings of ABC News interrupted General Hospital with a special bulletin to share the news with viewers. On the floor of the U.S. Senate, David Pryor called the reintroduction "a meaningful moment in U.S. history". The company hotline received 31,600 calls in the two days after the announcement.

The new product continued to be marketed and sold as "Coke" (until 1990, when it was renamed "Coke II") while the original formula was named "Coca-Cola Classic", and for a short time it was referred to by the public as Old Coke. Some who tasted the reintroduced formula were not convinced that the first batches really were the same formula that had supposedly been retired that spring. This was true for a few regions, because Coca-Cola Classic differed from the original formula in that all bottlers who had not already done so were using HFCS instead of cane sugar to sweeten the drink, though most had by this time.

"There is a twist to this story which will please every humanist and will probably keep Harvard professors puzzled for years," said Keough at a press conference. "The simple fact is that all the time and money and skill poured into consumer research on the new Coca-Cola could not measure or reveal the deep and abiding emotional attachment to original Coca-Cola felt by so many people."

Mullins was given the first case of Coca-Cola Classic. Later he complained that the drink now made him sick, which he blamed on the drink's use of HFCS; he also claimed that HFCS had dulled his taste buds, accounting for his preference for New Coke in taste tests.

== Aftermath and legacy ==
Six months after New Coke's introduction, sales of Coke had increased at twice the rate of rival Pepsi. By the end of 1985, Coca-Cola Classic was substantially outselling both New Coke and Pepsi. New Coke's sales dwindled to a three percent share of the market, although it was selling quite well in Los Angeles and some other key markets. Later research, however, suggested that it was not the return of Coca-Cola Classic, but instead the largely unnoticed introduction of Cherry Coke, which appeared almost simultaneously with New Coke, that can be credited with the company's success in 1985.

The Coca-Cola Company spent a considerable amount of time trying to figure out where it had made a mistake, ultimately concluding that it had underestimated the public reaction of the portion of the customer base that would be alienated by the switch. This would not emerge for several years afterward, however, and in the meantime the public simply concluded that the company had, as Keough suggested, failed to consider the public's attachment to the idea of what Coke's old formula represented. While that has become conventional wisdom in the ensuing years, some analyses have suggested otherwise.

This populist version of the story served Coke's interests, however, as the episode did more to position and define Coca-Cola as a brand embodying values distinct from Pepsi. Allowing itself to be portrayed as a somewhat clueless large corporation forced to withdraw from a big change by overwhelming public pressure flattered customers, as Keough put it, "We love any retreat which has us rushing toward our best customers with the product they love the most." Bottles and cans continued to bear the "Coca-Cola Classic" title until January 2009, when the company announced it would stop printing the word "Classic" on the labels of 16-US-fluid-ounce (470 ml) bottles sold in parts of the southeastern United States. The change was part of a larger strategy to rejuvenate the product's image.

Cosby ended his long-time advertising for Coca-Cola, claiming that his commercials praising the superiority of the new formula had hurt his credibility. No one at Coca-Cola was fired for the change. Goizueta claimed that he never once regretted the decision to change Coca-Cola. He even threw a tenth anniversary party for New Coke in 1995 and continued to drink it until his death in 1997. When Goizueta died, the company's share price was well above what it was when he had taken over 16 years earlier, and its position as market leader was even more firmly established. At the time, Roger Enrico, head of PepsiCo's American operations, likened New Coke to the Edsel. Later, when he became PepsiCo's CEO, he modified his assessment of the situation, saying that had people been fired or demoted over New Coke, it would have sent a message that risk-taking was strongly discouraged at the company.

In the late 1990s, Zyman summed up the New Coke experience thus:

Yes, it infuriated the public, cost us a ton of money and lasted for only 77 days before we reintroduced Coca-Cola Classic. Still, New Coke was a success because it revitalized the brand and reattached the public to Coke.

New Coke continued to do what it had originally been designed to do: win taste tests. In 1987, The Wall Street Journal surveyed 100 randomly selected cola drinkers, the majority of whom indicated a preference for Pepsi, with Classic Coke accounting for the remainder save two New Coke loyalists. When this group was given a chance to try all three in a blind test, New Coke slightly edged out Pepsi, but many drinkers reacted angrily to finding they had chosen a brand other than their favorite.

=== After Coca-Cola Classic ===
In the short run, the reintroduction of original Coca-Cola saved Coke's sales figures and brought it back in the good graces of many customers and bottlers. Phone calls and letters to the company were as joyful and thankful as they had been angry and depressed. "You would have thought we'd cured cancer," said one executive.

But confusion reigned at the company's marketing department, which had to design a plan to market two Coca-Colas where such plans were inconceivable just a few months before. Coca-Cola Classic did not need much help, with a "Red, White and You" campaign showcasing the American virtues many of those who had clamored for its reintroduction had pointedly reminded the company that it embodied. But the company was at a loss to sell what was now just "Coke". "The Best Just Got Better" could no longer be used. Marketers fumbled for a strategy for the rest of the year. Matters were not helped when McDonald's announced shortly after the reintroduction of Coca-Cola Classic, that it was immediately switching from New Coke back to original Coca-Cola at all of its restaurants.

Max Headroom print ad from the "Catch the wave" campaign

At the beginning of 1986, however, Coke's marketing team found a strategy by returning to one of their original motives for changing the formula: the youth market that preferred Pepsi. Max Headroom, the purportedly computer-generated media personality played by Matt Frewer, was chosen to replace Cosby as the spokesman for Coke's "Catch the wave" campaign. With his slicked-back hair and sunglasses, he was already known to much of the U.S. youth audience through appearances on MTV and Cinemax. The campaign was launched with a television commercial produced by McCann Erickson New York, with Max saying in his trademark stutter, "C-c-c-catch the wave!" and referring to his fellow "Cokeologists". In a riposte to Pepsi's televisual teasings, one showed Headroom asking a Pepsi can he was "interviewing" how it felt about more drinkers preferring Coke to it and then cut to the condensation forming on, and running down, the can. "S-s-s-s-sweating?" he asked.

The campaign was a huge success. "Max's 'C-C-Catch the wave' spots for Coke," a Newsweek article said, "two of which were directed by Ridley Scott, may be the most cleverly structured pitches ever aimed at the under-30 viewer." John Reid, Coke's SVP of marketing, claimed that "76 percent of teenagers had heard of Max after our first flight of ads." Surveys likewise showed that more than three-quarters of the target market were aware of the ads within two days. Coke's consumer hotline received more calls about Max than any previous spokesperson, some even asking if he had a girlfriend. The ads and campaign continued through 1987 and were chosen as best of 1986 by Video Storyboard of New York.

=== Coke II ===
By 1990, the Coca-Cola Company was ready to introduce a radically different marketing campaign for New Coke under the name Coke II, but in only one market – Spokane, Washington, a Pepsi stronghold. The company and bottler put significant resources into the launch of Coke II, including offering 16 oz. cans with 4 oz. free, new "We've Got Your Number" radio and TV ads, and on-air giveaways on KZZU. The ads tried to explain the taste of Coke II as having "real cola taste plus the sweetness of Pepsi, two things that add up to smooth, refreshing Coke II." Pepsi struck back with legal challenges to the taste claim, lowered its in-store prices, and ramped up its own advertising. Coke II market share rose to 4% early in the test but then fell back to 2.3%. The test was not extended past Spokane.

In a market already offering several choices of drinks calling themselves "Coke" in some fashion or another, the public saw little reason to embrace a product they had firmly rejected seven years earlier. By 1998, Coke II could only be found in a few scattered markets in the Northwest, Midwest and some overseas territories. In July 2002, Coca-Cola announced that Coke II would be discontinued entirely. On August 16, 2002, the Coca-Cola Company announced a change of the label of Coke Classic in which the word "Classic" was no longer so prominent, leading to speculation that it would eventually be removed and the last traces of New Coke eliminated. In 2009, Coca-Cola permanently removed "Classic" from its North American packaging.

=== Commercial legacy ===
"For a product so widely despised," noted AdWeek blogger Tim Nudd in 2006, "New Coke (a.k.a. Coke II) still gets an admirable amount of ink." He noted Blink: The Power of Thinking Without Thinking (2005) by Malcolm Gladwell, and Why Most Things Fail: Evolution, Extinction and Economics (2005) by Paul Ormerod, that dealt with it at some length, as well as two recent mentions in Forbes and Sports Illustrated.

=== Conspiracy theories ===
The Coca-Cola Company's apparently sudden reversal on New Coke led to conspiracy theories, including:

- The company intentionally changed the formula, hoping consumers would be upset with the company, and demand the original formula to return, which in turn would cause sales to spike. Keough, the company president, answered this speculation by saying "We're not that dumb, and we're not that smart."
- The putative switch was planned all along to cover the change from sugar-sweetened Coke to much less expensive HFCS, a theory that was supposedly given credence by the apparently different taste of Coke Classic when it first hit the market (the U.S. sugar trade association took out a full-page ad lambasting Coke for using HFCS in all bottling of the old formula when it was reintroduced). In fact, Coca-Cola began allowing bottlers to remove up to half of the product's cane sugar as early as 1980, five years before the introduction of New Coke. By the time the new formula was introduced, most bottlers in the U.S. were already sweetening Coca-Cola entirely with HFCS.
- It provided cover for the final removal of all coca derivatives from the product to placate the Drug Enforcement Administration, which was trying to eradicate the plant worldwide to combat an increase in cocaine trafficking and consumption. While Coke's executives were indeed relieved the new formula contained no coca and concerned about the long-term future of the Peruvian government-owned coca fields that supplied it in the face of increasing DEA pressure to end cultivation of the crop, according to author Mark Pendergrast there was no direct pressure from the DEA on Coca-Cola to do so. This theory was endorsed in a Time article, as well as by historian Bartow Elmore, author of Citizen Coke: The Making of Coca-Cola Capitalism, who claims the reformulation was made in response to the escalating war on drugs by the Reagan Administration.

=== Taste test problems ===
In his book Blink, Gladwell relates his conversations with market researchers in the food industry who put most of the blame for the failure of New Coke on the flawed nature of taste tests. They claim most are subject to systematic biases. Tests such as the Pepsi Challenge were "sip tests", meaning that drinkers were given small samples (less than a can or bottle's worth) to try. Gladwell contends that what people say they like in these tests may not reflect what they actually buy to drink at home over several days. Carol Dollard, who once worked in product development for PepsiCo, told Gladwell: "I've seen many times where the sip test will give you one result and the home-use test will give you the exact opposite." For example, although many consumers react positively to the sweeter taste of Pepsi in small volumes, it may become unattractively sweet when drunk in quantity. A more comprehensive testing regimen could possibly have revealed this, Gladwell's sources believe.

Gladwell reports that other market researchers have criticized Coke for not realizing that much of its success as a brand came from what they call sensation transference, a phenomenon first described by marketer Louis Cheskin in the late 1940s: tasters unconsciously add their reactions to the drink's packaging into their assessment of the taste. For example, one of the researchers told Gladwell that his firm's research found 7-Up drinkers believed a sample from a bottle with a more yellow label was more "lemony", although the flavor was identical. In Coke's case, it is alleged that buyers, subject to sensation transference, were also "tasting" the red color of the container and distinctive Coca-Cola script. It was therefore, in their opinion, a mistake to focus solely on the product and its taste. "The mistake Coke made was in attributing their loss in share entirely to the product," said Darrel Rhea, an executive with the firm Cheskin founded. He points to PepsiCo's work in establishing a youth-oriented brand identity from the 1960s as having more bearing on its success.

Coke considered but rejected gradually changing the drink's flavor incrementally, without announcing they were doing so. Executives feared the public would notice and exaggerate slight differences in taste. In 1998, Joel Dubow, a professor of food marketing at St. Joseph's University, tested this "flavor balance hypothesis" and argued that it was not true. He and fellow researcher Nancy Childs tested mixtures of Coca-Cola Classic and Coke II and found that the gradual changes of taste were not noticed by a significant number of tasters. Coke, he said, would have succeeded had it chosen this strategy.

== 2019 reintroduction ==
On May 21, 2019, Coca-Cola announced that the 1985 reformulation (once again bearing the name "New Coke") would be reintroduced in limited quantities to promote the third season of the Netflix series Stranger Things. The show, set in 1985, includes cans of New Coke in three of the season's episodes. About 500,000 cans of New Coke were produced for the promotion, to be sold mostly online. So many people were eager to buy it, however, that the volume of orders crashed the Coca-Cola website. Many fans complained because they wanted to order some, and the company apologized for the delays on social media platforms. It was also available in select vending machines in cities such as New York and Los Angeles.

The reintroduction of New Coke received friendlier reviews than it had in 1985. A writer at BuzzFeed said it was "nice and refreshing", lacking the lingering aftertaste of classic Coca-Cola. "I would take this over other colas," said a colleague. Food & Wine staffers also had favorable impressions: "sweeter and smoother than regular Coke", "almost syrupy in a pleasant way", although an older member who recalled the original rollout in 1985 said it had not improved for them.

Tim Murphy, a reporter for Mother Jones, suggested that in ultimately overcoming an initial resistance that he saw as reactionary, New Coke had won the war after losing the battle. "Soft-drink trends have also proven Coke right about a willingness to adapt to new tastes: A majority of Coke sales today are non-Classic products, such as Diet and Coke Zero," he wrote. This explained the favorable response from tasters. "It tasted weird then; it tastes like what's normal now."

== See also ==
- List of defunct consumer brands
- List of Coca-Cola brands

=== Other soft drink failures ===
- Crystal Pepsi, early 1990s failure for that company that is occasionally reintroduced for limited periods
- Dasani, bottled water brand produced by Coca-Cola that failed in the United Kingdom despite huge marketing push
- MagiCan, failed Coca-Cola promotion in 1990
- OK Soda, Coca-Cola brand intended to appeal to Generation X drinkers in early 1990s known for its counterintuitive marketing, managed by Sergio Zyman
