= Modern Cartoonist =

1997 essay by Daniel Clowes

Modern Cartoonist is a 1997 essay by Daniel Clowes published as a 16-page black, white and red illustrated pamphlet. It was originally bound in with copies of Eightball #18 and was also offered for sale individually. Although the back cover describes it as being published by "The Catholic Federation for Preservation and Advancement of All Things Related to the Comic Book and its Creators, Inc.," the address given for ordering additional copies is that of Fantagraphics Books, presumably its actual publisher. Because of its subject matter, its small dimensions and its illustrations, and its original distribution inside of a comic book, Modern Cartoonist is sometimes classed as a minicomic.

The essay is a series of portentous reflections on the comics medium and its present and future challenges. It is divided into four parts: "The Current Situation", "So, Why Comics?", "To the Young Cartoonist" and "The Future and Beyond".

In a 2001 interview Clowes, while denying that the essay was a joke, said that his intention in Modern Cartoonist was "to write something that had this certain tone that I find amusing, something that's on the razor's edge between this sort of pompous, heartfelt earnestness and its ironic counterpoint."

== Quotes ==
"[O]ne of the reasons why comics are such a potentially alluring forum for the individual creator [is that] they are in a sense the ultimate domain of the artist who seeks to wield absolute control over his imagery. Novels are the work of one individual but they require visual collaboration on the part of the reader. Film is by its nature a collaborative endeavor. The filmmaker's vision, filtered through 'reality', is more accessible to a general audience but in most cases less a precise, preconceived vision than one based on compromise and serendipity. Comics offer the creator a chance to control the specifics of his own world in both abstract and literal terms." (p. 7)

"The new technology promises a structural shift ('democratization' is a word they use) in the reader's favor, giving him an exaggerated role in the give-and-take between artist and audience. He is to be given choices so he can 'interact' with the narrative. Is this a good thing? Is our every reader a worthy collaborator or does his involvement dilute the whole process? Do we, as readers, want this? This is where the 'entertainment media' at large is headed: to pander to the impatient lout and to provide him with material that ranges only from masturbation fodder to the narrative equivalent of a roller-coaster ride." (pp. 13-14)

== Illustrations ==
Most of the pamphlet's illustrations feature an archetypal cartoonist working at his drawing board. Several are exaggeratedly pessimistic in tone; the cover image shows him surrounded by collapsing buildings, while another shows him slitting his wrists. It is unclear if the drawings are in any sequence that would qualify them as sequential art.
