= Mister Wonderful (comics) =

Graphic novel by Daniel Clowes

- Mister Wonderful cover (Pantheon, 2011)
- Date: 2011
- Page count: 80 pages
- Publisher: Pantheon Books

Creative team
- Creator: Daniel Clowes

Original publication
- Published in: The New York Times Magazine

Chronology
- Preceded by: Wilson
- Followed by: The Death-Ray

Mister Wonderful is a graphic novel by American cartoonist Daniel Clowes, published in 2011 by Pantheon Books after first being serialized in The New York Times Magazine. Its main protagonists are Marshall (a self-disparaging, middle-aged loner) and Natalie, who are brought together on a blind date. Marshall finds his date far too attractive to be interested in him and concludes there must be something wrong with her when she does not show signs of wanting to leave. Marshall's self-deprecating, paranoid introspections so overwhelm him that his own thought balloons sometimes cover up Natalie's dialogue.

The book is published in an unusual format, wider than it is long. This allows for an extremely wide two-page spread at the conclusion. The book was expanded and the pages were reformatted from their original twenty-instalment appearance in The New York Times Magazine in 2007 and 2008.

== Bibliography ==
- CBR News staff (2011-04-13). "Clowes is "Mister Wonderful"". Comic Book Resources. Archived from the original on April 14, 2011.
- McMurtrie, John (2011-05-01). "'Mister Wonderful,' by Daniel Clowes". San Francisco Chronicle. p. GF-7.
- Rogers, Sean (April 29, 2011). "Reviews: Mister Wonderful". The Comics Journal.
- Smart, James (2011-04-02). "Mister Wonderful by Daniel Clowes Review". The Guardian.
- Weldon, Glen (2011-04-20). "Mister Wonderful Pictures An Imperfect Romance". National Public Radio.
