= Monica (graphic novel) =

2023 graphic novel by Daniel Clowes

- Creator: Daniel Clowes
- Date: October 3, 2023
- Page count: 106 pages
- Publisher: Fantagraphics
- ISBN: 978-1683968825

Chronology
- Preceded by: Patience

Monica is a graphic novel by American cartoonist Daniel Clowes, published in 2023 by Fantagraphics. Described as a genre-bending thriller, is a series of interconnected narratives that collectively tell the life story of its title character.

The book also explores cults, conspiracy theories, and the mid-20th century.

== Reception ==
Monica received critical acclaim. In his review for The New York Times, Junot Díaz deemed the graphic novel "a masterpiece", while Vanity Fair stated that Clowes had reached a "new artistic peak".

American filmmaker Ari Aster named Monica the Best Book of 2023.

The comic also received the prestigious Fauve d'Or at the 51^{e} Édition of the "Festival de la BD d'Angoulême" in January 2024.
