= Pepsi Cool Cans =

1990 promotional cola cans

Two Neon cans arranged to display the alleged hidden word SEX.

The Pepsi Cool Cans are a series of promotional cola cans produced in 1990 with four different designs, as part of a PepsiCo advertising campaign. The designs passed into folklore, particularly the one titled Neon, due to the belief that the word SEX was hidden in that design.

== History ==
PepsiCo distributed limited edition Pepsi Cool Cans in the United States in 1990, from Memorial Day to Independence Day. This promotion marked the first change to the design on Pepsi cans since 1979. It occurred during the Cola wars, and the cans debuted at about the same time that rival Coca-Cola's MagiCans campaign was aborted. Pepsi Cool Cans were produced in four designs, called Confetti, Sunglasses, Neon and Motifs. Part of a larger Pepsi rebranding strategy, which included a change of logo, the cans were intended to appeal the teenage market. PepsiCo was attempting to portray Pepsi as a drink for the young, and conversely, Coca-Cola as being for older people.

== Hidden message controversy ==
After the Pepsi Cool Cans were released, some people began to claim that when one Neon can was stacked on top of another, and the two cans were aligned in a certain way, the word SEX could be seen in the design. A number of parents complained to PepsiCo about this, but a spokesman for the company dismissed the concern: "I guess if you look hard enough at clouds in the sky, you could see various images and messages that other people don't see." Another spokesman stated that the supposed hidden message resulted from "pure coincidence". Eventually, however, the complaints caused PepsiCo to stop distributing the cans, but the campaign was still seen as successful, as sales of Pepsi had increased by 20%.
