= Pussey! =

Comics serial and graphic novel by Daniel Clowes

- Cover of the hardcover collection
- Date: 1995
- Publisher: Fantagraphics Books

Creative team
- Creator: Daniel Clowes

Original publication
- Published in: Eightball
- Issues: 1, 3–5, 8–10, 12, 14
- Date of publication: October 1989 – October 1994
- ISBN: 1-56097-186-X (hardcover); 1-56097-183-5 (softcover)

Chronology
- Followed by: Like a Velvet Glove Cast in Iron

Pussey! is a comics serial and graphic novel by Daniel Clowes. It was originally serialized across nine non-consecutive issues of Clowes's alternative comic book Eightball, and was later collected by Fantagraphics Books with an introduction by Crispin Glover.

Pussey! tells the satirical story of a comic book artist named Dan Pussey, following him from his childhood years, through his successful career and into aged obscurity. Along the way he lampoons the comics industry as a whole, including direct satires of several creators, such art Art Spiegelman stand-in character Gummo Bubbleman.

Dave Gilson, writing for Mother Jones, called Pussey! a "knowing send-up of comic nerddom", and Tom Spurgeon of The Comics Reporter said that "works like Pussey...remind that he may also be its best living practitioner of filthy, blunt satire".

== Cultural references ==
- In the final episode of The IT Crowd ("The Internet Is Coming" Special, broadcast in September 2013), Jen Barber is seen reading the Fantagraphics Books book of the series.
