= MagiCan =

Promotional Coca-Cola cans in 1990

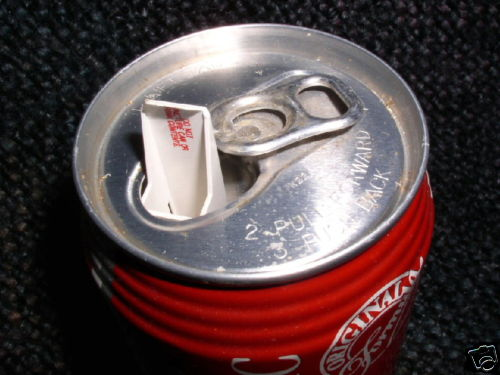
A spring-loaded tab dispensed real U.S. money or a gift certificate redeemable for trips or merchandise.

MagiCans were special, mechanical cans used by The Coca-Cola Company in the United States of America as a part of their $100-million "Magic Summer '90" promotion. The MagiCan promotion began on May 7, 1990, and ended on May 31.

In this promotion, some Coca-Cola cans had cash prizes or gift certificates inside instead of Coca-Cola. The prizes were spring-loaded to pop out of the opening once the can was opened. The prize would either be money, from $1 to $500, or coupons redeemable for trips or merchandise. The total giveaway of cash and prize coupons was $4 million. The original plan was to randomly distribute about 750,000 MagiCans among the 200 million cans of Coca-Cola Classic in circulation at any one time. To make the cans feel and weigh normal, and prevent people from easily finding the prize cans, a sealed area within the cans was filled with a mixture of chlorinated water and a foul-smelling substance to discourage drinking. Though initially a great success—that led to a rise in sales—technical difficulties led to the promotion's early termination.

== History ==
Coca-Cola first announced the "Magic Summer '90" campaign in March 1990 by sending MagiCans containing money to journalists. Some journalists wrote that it was questionable for a big corporation to mail cash to reporters. The campaign continued without the MagiCans, giving away tickets to the Coca-Cola–sponsored New Kids on The Block's Magic Summer Tour and distributing "MagiCups", which were paper cups with peel-off prizes on the exterior used for fountain drinks at fast-food chains and other fountain outlets.

== Technical issues and early termination ==
A number of cans had problems: the pop-up mechanism malfunctioned, jamming, or a faulty seal released some of the chlorinated water mixture into the can itself. A widely reported incident involved an 11-year-old boy in Massachusetts drinking the foul-tasting liquid used to replace actual cola. Despite initial fears, the Massachusetts Department of Public Health determined that the water was not harmful, containing a lower concentration of chlorine than the water in a typical swimming pool. Worried about the bad publicity and potential product liability lawsuits, Coke immediately placed television and newspaper advertisements in 50 large United States markets. The full-page ads, run only once, warned consumers that a "very small number" of cans contain a foul-smelling but harmless water that should not be ingested. The ads were headlined "Take A Good Look" and in smaller type, read "You could have a MagiCan." The print ads pointed out that the MagiCans might be defective, which actually proved a key point in any potential plaintiff's lawsuit under the doctrine of strict liability. Moreover, the problem with the chlorinated mixture was not concern of being drunk by accident, but that it spilled over into the prize. Multiple winners complained about receiving soggy money after activating a MagiCan.

"We are winding [the promotion] down early. There is the impression we don't like among our consumers that there is a problem with the promotion."
— Coca-Cola spokesperson Randy Donaldson

When Coca-Cola began receiving complaints about the faulty cans, it temporarily halted distribution of the MagiCans to local bottlers. The plan was to test MagiCans before distribution by shaking them to detect faulty mechanisms. Coca-Cola's own initial estimate was that 120,000 MagiCans were on store shelves or in bottler inventories at the initial release, of which less than 1 percent, or fewer than 1,200 cans, were faulty. Ultimately, Coke ended the campaign after only three weeks due to the negative publicity regarding faulty cans. This negative publicity included an editorial cartoon showing a man in sunglasses opening a soda can while standing near a billboard hyping MagiCans, then removing his sunglasses in surprise when a small sign emerges from his can reading "Buy Pepsi". The ads also drew fire from a 1990 issue of Zillions, the juvenile version of Consumer Reports magazine, in their annual "ZAP Awards" segments detailing the worst ads of 1990. Zillions' complaint was that the ads deceptively showed people opening cans that turned out to be MagiCans every time, making the contest look easier to win than it actually was (the magazine also made the same complaint about Burger King's "Whopper & Wheels" promotion, which received far less publicity).

The decision to end the campaign came one week after the "Take A Good Look" advertisements were released. Coca-Cola then released ads telling consumers that only a few prize cans were left on the market and that they would be "going, going, gone by mid-June", the time when the company estimated the existing cans would be purchased and off the shelves. At the time of termination, 200,000 of the 750,000 planned promotional cans had been distributed. Although largely confident there were no safety issues, Coca-Cola's final advertising spot showed New Kids on the Block with an added voiceover from Jordan Knight warning, "If you have a winning can, don't drink the liquid!"

Meanwhile, rival Pepsi also did a prize giveaway in 1990 under the Cool Cans promotion. Instead of a complicated push-up device in cans, each can was filled with normal, drinkable cola and at the bottom of the inside of the can there was a number printed that could correspond with a prize, from $25 to $20,000. The consumer called a toll-free number to find out if they had won. Pepsi's promotion also suffered from negative publicity when it was discovered that if two specific Cool Cans were stacked in a certain way, the designs appeared to spell out the word SEX. Coca-Cola would attempt a similar promotion three years later with "Monsters of the Gridiron", a Halloween-themed promotion where people could call a toll-free number and enter a code, to which a recording from an NFL star would tell them whether or not they won a prize.

Coca-Cola's quick damage-control initiative was reminiscent of the fiasco over New Coke several years earlier.

== Urban legend ==
There was an urban legend in the 1990s and 2000s that a child had died drinking the liquid in one of the MagiCans. This has been reported as false according to Snopes.com, and its origins were traced back to media coverage of a boy who was taken to the hospital as a precaution after his mother suspected product tampering.

== See also ==
- Cola wars
- My Coke Rewards, another Coca-Cola promotion with a similar concept, tied to redemption codes.
- OK Soda featured a similar promotion with their Prize Can
