= Twentieth Century Eightball =

Collection of comics by Daniel Clowes

Twentieth Century Eightball is a book collection of comics by Daniel Clowes published by Fantagraphics Books in 2002. It consists of numerous short pieces originally published in Clowes's Eightball comic book and other venues. Most of the contents previously appeared in the earlier, out-of-print collections Lout Rampage! and Orgy Bound, but the book also includes eight new stories.

== Contents ==
1. Little Enid
2. Title Story
3. Art School Confidential
4. Cool Your Jets
5. Ectomorph
6. The Truth
7. Ink Studs
8. The Stroll
9. Devil Doll?
10. Needledick the Bugfucker
11. Feldman
12. I Hate You Deeply
13. Zubrick and Pogeybait
14. Frankie and Johnnie
15. Marooned on a Desert Island with the People from the Subway
16. Just Another Day
17. Hippypants and Peace Bear
18. Zubrick
19. Chicago
20. Why I Hate Christians
21. Pogeybait
22. On Sports
23. Sexual Frustration
24. The Operator
25. A Message to the People of the Future
26. The Happy Fisherman
27. Give it Up!
28. Grist for the Mill
29. Ugly Girls
30. Curtain of Sanity
31. Playful Obsession
32. Squirrel Girl and Candypants
33. Paranoid
34. I Love You Tenderly
35. The Party
36. The Sensual Santa
37. My Suicide
38. Eightball
39. Man-Child
40. Wallace Wood
41. Tits
42. Tom Pudd
43. Grip Glutz and Shamrock Squid
44. You
45. About the Author
