= The Book of Other People =

Collection of short stories

- Editor: Zadie Smith
- Cover artist: Charles Burns
- Language: English
- Published: 2008 (Penguin Books)
- Publication place: United Kingdom; United States; Canada
- Media type: Print (Hardcover and paperback)
- Pages: 287
- ISBN: 978-0-241-14363-6
- OCLC: 153554268

The Book of Other People is a collection of short stories, published in 2008 by Penguin Books. Selected and edited by Zadie Smith, it contains 23 short stories by 23 different authors, among them Nick Hornby, David Mitchell, Colm Tóibín, Jonathan Safran Foer, Dave Eggers, as well as Smith herself. The collection, as evidenced by the title, focuses on character; the authors were simply asked to "make somebody up". It being a "charity anthology," the contributors to The Book of Other People were not compensated for their writing, and the book's proceeds were given to 826NYC, a non-profit organization dedicated to supporting students with their creative writing skills.

== Contents ==
One of the central requirements for the authors was that each contribution had to bear the character's name as its title. Though the editor, Smith, originally wanted each of the characters to have both first and last names, several of the authors did not include surnames, and that rule was eventually dropped. Indeed, several of the stories—such as "Puppy," "The Liar," and "The Monster"—do not have true names at all.

=== List of short stories ===
- "Judith Castle" by David Mitchell
- "Justin M. Damiano" by Daniel Clowes
- "Frank" by A. L. Kennedy
- "Gideon" by ZZ Packer
- "Gordon" by Andrew O'Hagan
- "Hanwell Snr" by Zadie Smith
- "J. Johnson" by Nick Hornby with Posy Simmonds
- "Lélé" by Edwidge Danticat
- "The Liar" by Aleksandar Hemon
- "Jordan Wellington Lint" by Chris Ware
- "Magda Mandela" by Hari Kunzru
- "The Monster" by Toby Litt
- "Nigora" by Adam Thirlwell
- "Judge Gladys Parks-Schultz" by Heidi Julavits
- "Puppy" by George Saunders
- "Rhoda" by Jonathan Safran Foer
- "Soleil" by Vendela Vida
- "Roy Spivey" by Miranda July
- "Cindy Stubenstock" by A. M. Homes
- "Theo" by Dave Eggers
- "Perkus Tooth" by Jonathan Lethem
- "Donal Webster" by Colm Tóibín
- "Newton Wicks" by Andrew Sean Greer

== Critical reception ==
The Book of Other People was generally well received by critics, who praised the authors' characterization; one wrote, "[they] create satisfying characters as memorable as any in their novels," and another that "[v]ariety ... is certainly on display."

Several of the stories were specifically commended, among them Danticat's "Lélé" and Tóibín's "Donal Webster", which were said to "unfold, like elaborate origami flowers, into complex portraits." However, not all were received well—one reviewer wrote that "[o]ther tales in this volume feel overly pat or mechanically perfunctory," and another that "a few of the contributions are bright but empty."
