= Caricature (comics) =

Book by Daniel Clowes

Cover of the 2002 paperback edition of Caricature

Caricature is a book collection of nine comic short stories by Daniel Clowes. In contrast to earlier Clowes collections such as Lout Rampage! and Orgy Bound, Caricature concentrates on the more naturalistic, character-focused side of Clowes's output displayed in Ghost World. It includes some of his most admired short stories, including "Immortal, Invisible", "Gynecology" and the title story. All the material in the collection originally appeared in Clowes's comic book Eightball with the exception of "Green Eyeliner", which was published in Esquire.

Caricature was first published by Fantagraphics Books in 1998 in a deluxe hardcover edition. A less expensive paperback version was released in 2002. Both editions contain a mixture of full-color and black-and-white comic short stories.

== Contents ==
1. "Caricature"
2. "Blue Italian Shit"
3. "The Gold Mommy"
4. "MCMLXVI"
5. "Like a Weed, Joe"
6. "Immortal, Invisible"
7. "Green Eyeliner"
8. "Gynecology"
9. "Black Nylon"
