= Lloyd Llewellyn =

Comic book by Daniel Clowes

- Cover of Lloyd Llewellyn #3 (Aug. 1986)

Publication information
- Publisher: Fantagraphics
- Schedule: Bimonthly
- Genre: Alternative comics
- Publication date: April 1986 – June 1987
- No. of issues: 6

Creative team
- Created by: Daniel Clowes
- Written by: Daniel Clowes, Mort Todd
- Artist: Daniel Clowes
- Penciller(s): Daniel Clowes, Mort Todd
- Inker: Daniel Clowes
- Letterer: Daniel Clowes
- Editor: Gary Groth

Collected editions
- #$@ &!: The Official Lloyd Llewellyn Collection: ISBN 0-930193-90-3
- The Manly World of Lloyd Llewellyn: ISBN 1560971452

Lloyd Llewellyn (sometimes abbreviated LLLL) is a black-and-white comic book by Daniel Clowes, published by Fantagraphics. The series' title character is a detective who has humorous adventures inspired by film noir and stereotypical 1950s lounge culture. The series' visual style was influenced by lowbrow art and the work of Bernard Krigstein.

== Publication history ==
The first Lloyd Llewellyn story, known as "The Last Time I Saw Irving," was published as a backup in Love and Rockets #13 (Fantagraphics, Sept. 1985); it included a special preview page for the upcoming Lloyd Llewellyn series.

The Lloyd Llewellyn series ran for six issues from April 1986 to June 1987. Other than one story written by Mort Todd, and one story penciled by Todd, Clowes wrote, drew, and lettered the entire series.

In the letters page of the final issue of the series, Clowes announces, "And who knows ... somewhere along that lonesome road we might see a new LLLL mag with a brand new format so dazzling, so breathtaking, so monumentally fantastic that I haven't even thought of it yet!" (Note: Also, in his closing statement from Lloyd Llewellyn #6 (June 1987), Clowes states that the character would appear as a backup feature in the then-upcoming Jim Rohn Holo Brothers series. (The Holo Brothers series finally debuted with Fantagraphics in April 1991, running 10 issues to July 1992. Lloyd Llewellyn did not make an appearance in any issue of that series; by that time, Clowes was fully engaged with his solo series Eightball.)) A final collection of new stories, the Lloyd Llewellyn Special, was published by Fantagraphics in December 1988.

== Creation and development ==
In a Comics Journal interview, Clowes explained that the name "Lloyd Llewellyn" originated in his childhood fascination with Superman comics, which frequently emphasized alliterative "LL" names such as Lois Lane and Lex Luthor. Clowes recalled finding this fixation on doubled initials "strange and fetishistic," and as a child imagined that a character named "Lloyd Llewellyn" would be "the greatest Superman character of all." The name lingered with him for years before he used it spontaneously when beginning a new comic strip.

Clowes said that the character's visual design and personality emerged without planning: the first panel he drew was his first and only conception of the character's appearance, with no preliminary sketches. He initially conceived Lloyd as "a cipher," functioning largely as a straight man to the surrounding absurd events and only loosely as a stand-in for the author himself — a role that developed more fully in later work.

He sent his first Lloyd Llewellyn story, known as "The Last Time I Saw Irving," to a number of different small press publishers, including Eclipse, but Fantagraphics offered to publish it without any editorial changes, so he went with them.

Clowes talked about how he intended the series "to be as commercial as possible." He said that Fantagraphics told him, "You have to have a main character, that character has to appear in every story, it has to catch on, and you have to go to comic conventions and do sketches of your one character so people know you from that." Clowes said, "I sort of took that at face value and thought, I'm going to give it my best and do the most commercial thing possible. And of course, it was beyond un-commercial. There's no level low enough to describe it on the scale of commerciality."

== Characters and content ==
In addition to Lloyd, he has a sidekick who goes by the name of Ernie Hoyle. The series' police sergeant is called "Red" Hoerring.

Individual stories typically consist of short episodic adventures in which Lloyd confronts bizarre villains and absurd situations, often collapsing classic noir expectations into comically over-the-top set-pieces. For example, early issues hover around eight-page detective parodies featuring femme fatales, beatniks, and eccentric mysteries in imagined late-1950s settings.

The story "The Nightmare," from Lloyd Llewellyn #6, in which Lloyd has recurring dreams about the coming decades, foreshadows the approach of Clowes's next comic, Eightball (debuting Oct. 1989), by breaking the conventions of the crime setting and turning to social satire.

== Other appearances ==
In addition to the Lloyd Llewellyn series and special, Clowes published other Lloyd Llewellyn stories in other books by Fantagraphics:

- (first appearance) "The Last Time I Saw Irving," Love and Rockets #13 (Sept. 1985); also special preview page
- "Under the Big Top", Doomsday Squad #2 (Sept. 1986, reprinting Charlton Comics's Doomsday + 1 #2 [Sept. 1975] with new backup material)
- "For Losers Only," Anything Goes #3 (Mar. 1987)
- "The Laffin' Spittin' Man," Eightball #1 (Aug. 1989)
- "I Hate You Deeply," Eightball #2 (Feb. 1990)
- "I Love You Tenderly," Eightball #4 (Oct. 1990)
- (cameo) "Eightball," Eightball #9 (Sept. 1992)

== Book collections ==
- #$@&!: The Official Lloyd Llewellyn Collection (Fantagraphics, 1993) ISBN 0-930193-90-3
- The Manly World of Lloyd Llewellyn (Fantagraphics, 1994) ISBN 1-56097-145-2
