= Lout Rampage! =

Lout Rampage! is a collection of comics by Daniel Clowes. This 1991 paperback includes stories from Eightball #1-6, along with strips Clowes created for alternative comics anthologies BLAB!, Young Lust, and Weirdo. It includes several of the cartoonist's one-page collaborations with The Duplex Planet creator David Greenberger and two of his most well-known comic-strip rants: "I Hate You Deeply" and "I Love You Tenderly".
