= Citizen Coke =

2014 book by Bartow J. Elmore

Citizen Coke: The Making of Coca-Cola Capitalism
- Author: Bartow J. Elmore
- Language: English
- Genre: Nonfiction
- Published: November 3, 2014
- Publisher: W. W. Norton & Company
- Publication place: United States
- Pages: 416 pp

Citizen Coke: The Making of Coca-Cola Capitalism is a 2014 nonfiction book written by Bartow J. Elmore.

== Overview ==
Elmore examines the history of Coca-Cola. He argues that the company's strategy of outsourcing raw ingredients instead of practicing vertical integration contributed to its success. He also describes the impact of the company's switch from returnable glass bottles to disposable bottles.

== Critical reception ==
The New York Times wrote "'Citizen Coke' began as a dissertation, and its points are lucid and logically presented; the language is accessible, and punchy chapter endings propel the story. But as a narrative, the structure is riddled with redundancies and leads to chronological whiplash."

Kirkus Reviews dubbed it "A superb, quietly devastating environmental and business history."

The Wall Street Journal wrote "In 'Citizen Coke,' Bartow J. Elmore meets the challenge. He examines an old story in a very new way, offering unaccustomed perspectives on a company whose leading product is a household name around the globe."
