= Art School Confidential =

2006 film by Terry Zwigoff

- Theatrical release poster
- Directed by: Terry Zwigoff
- Screenplay by: Daniel Clowes
- Based on: Art School Confidential by Daniel Clowes
- Produced by: Lianne Halfon; John Malkovich; Russell Smith
- Starring: Max Minghella; Sophia Myles; John Malkovich; Anjelica Huston; Jim Broadbent
- Cinematography: Jamie Anderson
- Edited by: Robert Hoffman
- Music by: David Kitay
- Production companies: United Artists; Mr. Mudd Productions
- Distributed by: Sony Pictures Classics
- Release dates: January 23, 2006 (Sundance); May 5, 2006 (United States)
- Running time: 102 minutes
- Country: United States
- Language: English
- Budget: $5 million
- Box office: $3.3 million

Art School Confidential is a 2006 American comedy-drama film directed by Terry Zwigoff and starring Max Minghella, Sophia Myles, John Malkovich, Jim Broadbent, Matt Keeslar, Ethan Suplee, Joel Moore, Nick Swardson, Adam Scott, and Anjelica Huston. The story follows Jerome (Minghella) who enrolls in art school and is loosely based on the comic of the same name by Daniel Clowes, who also wrote the screenplay. The film is Zwigoff's second collaboration with Clowes; the first was 2001's Ghost World, which was also released by United Artists. The film received polarized reviews from critics.

== Plot ==
Inspired by his longtime love of drawing, and hoping to meet girls, Jerome enrolls at the Strathmore School of Art. His roommates are aspiring filmmaker Vince and closeted-gay fashion major Matthew. Jerome looks for love amongst the female students, but is unsuccessful until he falls for art model Audrey, the daughter of a famous pop artist.

Jerome forms a friendship with classmate and perennial loser Bardo, a four-time dropout, who guides him through the college scene and introduces him to Jimmy, a Strathmore graduate who is now a failed artist and belligerent drunk. As he learns how the art world really works, Jerome finds that he must adapt his vision to reality. He slowly loses his idealism at art school and finds himself in competition with a mysterious student named Jonah for both Audrey's affection and artistic recognition. At the same time, a serial killer known as the Strathmore Strangler is on the loose near the campus, confounding the police and inspiring Vince to create a documentary about the murders.

In a wild attempt to win a prestigious art competition, Jerome asks for, and gets, Jimmy's paintings, which unbeknownst to him, are portraits of the Strangler's victims. Accidentally dropping a lit cigarette in Jimmy's apartment, he causes a fire that destroys the building, leaving Jimmy and all the other residents dead. The police arrest Jerome as the Strangler (who in fact was Jimmy). Audrey realizes Jerome is her true love and that she was stupid to be interested in Jonah, who turns out to be an undercover police officer with a wife and baby at home. Jerome is sent to prison, but his paintings, particularly one of Audrey, become prized by collectors.

Vince scores a huge hit with his documentary about the Strangler called My Roommate: The Murderer. In prison, Jerome continues to paint and sells his works at high prices, not caring that people think he is the killer as it has brought him financial success and recognition. Audrey comes to visit him in prison, and they share a kiss through the protective glass.

== Cast ==
- Max Minghella as Jerome
  - Zach Maurer as Young Jerome
- Sophia Myles as Audrey
- John Malkovich as Professor Sandiford
- Anjelica Huston as Art History Teacher
- Jim Broadbent as Jimmy
- Ethan Suplee as Vince
- Matt Keeslar as Jonah
- Joel David Moore as Bardo
- Adam Scott as Marvin Bushmiller
- Marshall Bell as Lonny
- Roxanne Hart as Mom Platz
- Chris L. McKenna as Mikey
- Katherine Moennig as Candace
- Nick Swardson as Matthew
- Marc Vann as Kevin
- Michael Shamus Wiles as Donald Baumgarten
- Ezra Buzzington as Leslie
- Bob Golub as Hector
- Scoot McNairy as Army-Jacket
- Marie L. Bain as Helena Sandiford
- Roxanne Day as Marie (Jonah's Wife)
- Ozman Sirgood as Dad Platz
- Katija Pevec as Cynthia Platz
- Charlie Talbert as Vince's Editor
- Brian Geraghty as Stoob
- Shelly Cole as Filthy-Haired Girl
- Richard Bakalyan as Cranky Guard
- Steve Buscemi (uncredited) as Bob "Broadway Bob" D'Annunzio

== Production ==
Sophia Myles was terrified about her nude scene (the first in her career) but finally she did it. "If there is going to be nudity in a film, I would rather do it myself than use my body double. If they use one, they can go and do a day's shooting, you don't know what they're doing and people still think it's you," she said.

== Reception ==
Art School Confidential received polarized reviews from critics. On the review aggregator website Rotten Tomatoes, 36% of 134 critics' reviews are positive, with an average rating of 5.7/10. The website's consensus reads: "Art School's (sic) misanthropy is too sour, its targets too flat and cliched, and Clowes and Zwigoff stumble when trying to build a story around the premise." Metacritic, which uses a weighted average, assigned the film a score of 54 out of 100, based on 30 critics, indicating "mixed or average" reviews.

[Art School Confidential] was really negatively received both at the box office and critically. Everybody hated that film. I didn't think it was so bad. At least compared to all that other shit out there, anyway. It was certainly just as good as any film in the marketplace. And I'm not saying it's a great film. I'm just saying it's better than most of the dreck.

— Terry Zwigoff in 2012

== Artwork in the film ==
Much of the artwork featured in the film was produced by practicing visual artists with art careers independent of the film. The figurative drawings and paintings made by the main character Jerome were created by Caitlin Mitchell-Dayton, an Oakland, California painter and long-time professor at the San Francisco Art Institute. The Marvin Bushmiller character's work was created by musician and Devo member Mark Mothersbaugh, who is also a painter with a long exhibition record independent of his involvement with the film. The paintings made by the character Jonah were produced by Oakland, California artist and graphic novelist Daniel Clowes, creator of the short comic on which the film was based as well as the author of its screenplay and co-producer.
