= Like a Velvet Glove Cast in Iron =

1993 graphic novel by Dan Clowes

- Cover of the 1993 edition (the book was re-released in 1998 with a different cover).
- Author: Dan Clowes
- Illustrator: Dan Clowes
- Cover artist: Dan Clowes
- Language: English
- Subject: Horror, Surrealism
- Genre: Comics
- Publisher: Fantagraphics
- Publication date: 1993
- Publication place: United States
- Media type: Print, Paperback
- Pages: 144
- ISBN: 1-56097-116-9
- OCLC: 28385891
- Preceded by: #$@ &!: The Official Lloyd Llewellyn Collection
- Followed by: The Manly World of Lloyd Llewellyn: a Golden Treasury of his Complete Works

Like a Velvet Glove Cast in Iron is a graphic novel by American cartoonist Daniel Clowes. The book follows a fantastic and paranoid plot, differing in tone from the stark realism of Clowes' later more widely known Ghost World. It contains nightmarish imagery, including dismemberment, deformed people and animals, and sexual fetishism.

Clowes has talked about how the story was inspired by his dreams, as well as a recurring dream of his ex-wife's:

A lot of it is just daydreams, where ... I can just have these thoughts that are uncontrolled by common logic, and then I start to see things in a different way. It's sort of the same thing as when you wake up from a long dream and you, for one minute, see the absurdity of the world.

The book's title is a quote from the Russ Meyer film Faster, Pussycat! Kill! Kill! (The full line, as delivered by Lori Williams, is "You're cute, like a velvet glove cast in iron. And like a gas chamber, Varla, a real fun gal.")

== Publication history ==
Like many of Clowes' extended works, Like a Velvet Glove Cast in Iron originally appeared in serial form in his comic book Eightball (issues #1–#10, 1989–1993) but has been reprinted as a trade paperback. The opening panels of later chapters of the story were presented in color when originally published in Eightball. When collected in trade paperback form, the chapters of the story were given names, and a table of contents was added to reflect this.

Velvet Glove has since been reprinted many times, and is currently in its sixth edition. The book has also been translated into Italian, Japanese, French, Spanish, Polish, and Greek. The French edition was nominated for the 2000 Angoulême International Comics Festival Prize for Best Album.

== Plot ==
Like a Velvet Glove Cast in Iron is about a man named Clay Loudermilk and his attempts to locate his estranged wife. (The song "the Ballad of Barbara Allen" forms a commentary on the story with its elements of unrequited love, loss, and death.) For reasons unknown, Clay is in the audience at a porno theatre when he sees a bizarre BDSM feature (also titled Like a Velvet Glove Cast in Iron), the star of which is revealed to be his wife, who appears in the credits as "Madame Van Damme". Clay sets out to locate her and becomes embroiled in a series of misadventures involving an incredibly weird cast of supporting characters. Clay is victimized by two crazed policemen, meets a religious cult led by a mass-murderer who intend to overthrow the American government, conspiracy theorists who believe that the reins of the world's political power somehow revolve around a series of dime store novelty figures, a malformed, half-fish young woman and her nymphomaniacal mother, and various other freaks and weirdos. During one dream sequence, the infamous Foot Foot, from the song by The Shaggs, gnaws on Clay's leg.

The happy-face icon of "Mr. Jones" also appears in various places through the story (reminiscent of Alfred E. Neuman, the mascot of Mad magazine, whose image dates at least back into the 1800s). Images of Mr. Jones are tattooed into people, carved on to Clay's foot, as a ghost-like character, in Hitler's birthmark, and on the sign for Value Ape shops. It signifies the way in which logos pervade our societies, and links to the conspiracy elements of the story. The true nature of the fish-woman's father is never learned by Mr. Loudermilk, but readers familiar with the stories of H.P. Lovecraft will note connections to Lovecraft's novella The Shadow over Innsmouth, which involves the monstrous interbreeding of humans and unspeakable denizens of the deep. The phrase "Kenneth, what is the frequency?", referencing the bizarre Dan Rather incident (some years before the R.E.M. song did the same thing), is used as part of the "Mr. Jones" conspiracy sub-plot. There are, in addition, references to child pornography and snuff films.

== In other media ==
Like a Velvet Glove Cast in Iron is one of very few graphic novels to have inspired an official soundtrack album. The 10-track CD by Victor Banana (a.k.a. cartoonist Tim Hensley) was released in 1993 on the Jenkins-Peabody label.

In issue #11 of Eightball, published after the conclusion of the Velvet Glove storyline, Clowes did a story about a hypothetical movie based on his book. As presented by Clowes, the film is a highly commercialized, poorly made flop, with little in common with Clowes' original story beyond the title and a few superficial elements.

== Bibliography ==
- Burr, Ty. "Like a Velvet Glove Cast in Iron," Entertainment Weekly (May 21, 1993).
- Valenti, Kristy. "Where Were You When... :On Daniel Clowes Like a Velvet Glove Cast in Iron," Comixology (October 6, 2008).
- Valenti, Kristy. "Keepsakes to Commandeer: Tim Hensley and the Like a Velvet Glove Cast in Iron Soundtrack," Comixology (October 14, 2008).
- Valenti, Kristy. "What's the Frequency, Kenneth?: The LAVGCII Soundtrack + Graphic Novel," Comixology (October 21, 2008).
