= Wilson (2017 film) =

- Theatrical release poster
- Directed by: Craig Johnson
- Written by: Daniel Clowes
- Based on: Wilson by Daniel Clowes
- Produced by: Jared Ian Goldman; Mary Jane Skalski
- Starring: Woody Harrelson; Laura Dern; Isabella Amara; Judy Greer; Cheryl Hines
- Cinematography: Frederick Elmes
- Edited by: Paul Zucker
- Music by: Jon Brion
- Production company: Ad Hominem Enterprises
- Distributed by: Fox Searchlight Pictures
- Release dates: January 22, 2017 (Sundance); March 24, 2017 (United States)
- Running time: 101 minutes
- Country: United States
- Language: English
- Budget: $5 million
- Box office: $653,951

Wilson is a 2017 American comedy drama film directed by Craig Johnson and written by Daniel Clowes, based on Clowes' graphic novel Wilson. The film stars Woody Harrelson, Laura Dern, Isabella Amara, Judy Greer, and Cheryl Hines. The film had its world premiere at the Sundance Film Festival on January 22, 2017, and was theatrically released by Fox Searchlight Pictures on March 24, 2017.

== Plot ==
Wilson is a lonely and neurotic middle-aged man living in Minnesota with his dog and sole companion, Pepper. He has spent the last seventeen years divorced from Pippi, who aborted their child and turned to a life of prostitution and drug use. Wilson’s life turns for the worse when his friend Robert moves away along with his family, and his father dies from terminal cancer.

Desperate to meet someone new, he tries unsuccessfully to court a woman at a pet store by conversing with her and rear-ending her vehicle. A different woman, Alta, is flattered by his attempt and goes out with him for ice cream. She aids Wilson in finding Pippi online, and he decides to track her down. He eventually finds her at a lakeside restaurant where she’s a waitress. They initially have a tense reunion as she has been rebuilding her life, but they warm up again and spend the night together. Pippi reveals to Wilson that she didn’t abort their child, a daughter, but gave her up for adoption.

Elated by his newfound purpose, Wilson discovers the child is named Claire and shows a photo of her to Pippi. Pippi reluctantly accompanies Wilson as they track down Claire’s home and follow her to a shopping mall. Wilson aggressively comes to Claire’s defense when she’s being bullied by a group of teenagers, leading to an awkward initial meeting with her. As Wilson and Pippi reconnect, they begin to spend time with Claire, though she makes it clear that she doesn’t want them to meet her adoptive parents.

Pippi hopes to show her vindictive sister Polly that she has turned her life around. Wilson initiates a trip to Polly’s house across the state. Their stayover unravels when Polly learns that Claire lied to her parents about traveling out of state, claiming she was staying at a friend’s house. Pippi attacks Polly, which leads to Polly calling the police, and they arrest Wilson and Pippi.

Wilson is sentenced to 36 months in prison for kidnapping and endangering the welfare of a child, while Pippi avoids prison time due to a plea deal. Wilson eventually adapts to life in prison but is left heartbroken by Pippi when she visits him in prison and reveals that she’s moving to Australia with her NA sponsor, Tucker. After Wilson is released, he returns to his hometown to learn from his friend and former pet sitter Shelly that Pepper died. After Wilson and Shelly grieve for Pepper, they bond romantically.

Claire reconnects with Wilson and inquires if he has any hereditary diseases because she is pregnant and moving to Portland. Wilson attempts to re-enter Claire’s life and considers moving to Portland but is rejected by Clarie’s adoptive father. Claire eventually agrees to give Wilson a second chance.

Months later, Wilson and Shelly are living together with a new dog as they answer a video call from Claire and her new baby.

== Cast ==
- Woody Harrelson as Wilson, Pippi's estranged husband and Claire's father
- Laura Dern as Lynn aka "Pippi", Wilson's estranged wife, Claire's mother, and Polly's sister
- Isabella Amara as Claire, the 17-year-old daughter of Wilson and Lynn (Pippi) and Polly's niece
- Bruce Bohne as Carl
- Judy Greer as Shelly
- Paul Cram as Helper
- Cheryl Hines as Polly, Lynn's sister and Claire's aunt
- Margo Martindale as Alta
- David Warshofsky as Orson
- Brett Gelman as Robert
- Mary Lynn Rajskub as Jodie
- Lauren Weedman as Cat Lady
- Katie Rose Law as Monika
- Ava Justin as Girl

== Production ==
The film rights to Clowes' graphic novel Wilson were originally purchased by Fox Searchlight for Alexander Payne to direct. The movie was filmed at multiple locations in the Minneapolis-St. Paul metro area from June to August 2015.

== Release ==
The film had its world premiere at the 2017 Sundance Film Festival on January 22. The film was originally set to be released on March 3, 2017, but was pushed back to March 24.

== Reception ==
On review aggregator website Rotten Tomatoes, the film has an approval rating of 47% based on 131 reviews, with a weighted average of 5.45/10. The site's critical consensus reads: "Woody Harrelson delivers a solid performance as Wilson's titular grump, but the movie surrounding him can't quite manage to make the character's sour outlook consistently relatable." On Metacritic, the film has a score of 49 out of 100, based on 34 critics, indicating "mixed or average reviews".
