= Ice Haven =

2005 graphic novel

== Overview ==
The cover of Ice Haven

Ice Haven is a 2005 graphic novel by cartoonist Daniel Clowes. The book's contents were originally published as the comic book Eightball #22 before being reformatted to make the hardcover Ice Haven book. Originally, Eightball #22 was a comic book series that Clowes released in 2001. The work was initially inspired by Leopold and Loeb, and by Charles Schultz' Peanuts.

Set in the fictional small town of Ice Haven, the graphic novel comprises 29 short, stylistically diverse comic strips. These strips explore the lives of the town's residents, each providing a unique perspective on the town's dynamics. Although each strip is separately titled and presented as if it is self-contained, together they tell a story about the characters' interrelated lives. Collectively, they create a narrative centered around the kidnapping of a young boy named David Goldberg. This central plot ties together the seemingly disparate lives of the characters, revealing their connections and the impact of the event on the community.

== Characters ==
Random Wilder
The supposedly humble narrator of the story who is neither humble nor much of a narrator. He is mainly concerned with his own problems. Wilder is an aspiring writer who nurses a bitter rivalry with Ice Haven's current poet laureate, Ida Wentz. He lives alone and looks down on the general public.
Vida
Described as an "out-of-town guest", Vida is a struggling writer who is visiting her grandmother, Ida Wentz. She writes a magazine which doesn't sell. After reading some of Random Wilder's poems, she becomes obsessed with the neighbor who she describes as an "owlish oddity", and begins to follow him around.
David Goldberg
A boy who is kidnapped during the course of the story. He does not speak.
Charles
A quiet boy who only talks at length and intelligently to his young neighbor, George. He's disturbed by the behavior he observes from Carmichael, with whom he goes to school. Secretly, Charles is madly in love with his stepsister, Violet, and wishes to end the marriage of their parents in order for them to be together at a later date.
Carmichael
A "troubled youth." He speaks mainly to Charles, though the two are not exactly friends. After he loans Charles a book about the Leopold and Loeb murder (the contents of which are summarized in a one-page comic strip), Charles suspects he might be involved in David Goldberg's disappearance.
Violet
A teenager in her senior year of high school. She is romantically involved with a boy named Penrod and often daydreams about him. She is unhappy at home with her mother and stepfather, is teased at school, and appears to be friendly only with a girl named Julie.
Harry Naybors
A serious comic book enthusiast and critic. He is the first character to be introduced after David Goldberg. Harry is the only character to break the fourth wall and speak directly to the reader.
Mr. Ames
A private investigator who comes to Ice Haven to look into the disappearance of David Goldberg. He has angry outbursts but is otherwise emotionally unreadable. He cares deeply for both his wife and his work.
Mrs. Ames
Mr. Ames's wife, who is investigating the case alongside her husband. She grows increasingly fed up with him and their marriage. It is implied that she pursues multiple extramarital affairs while in Ice Haven.
Ida Wentz
Vida's kindly and emotional grandmother. A poet laureate residing in Ice Haven.
Julie Rathman
An overweight friend of Violet's who works at a stationery store and is generally miserable.
Kim Lee
A convenience store worker who is uncommunicative with customers.
Paula
A young girl who goes to school with Charles and Carmichael. She is taking ballet and is revealed to have a particularly gloomy outlook.
George
Charles's young neighbor in whom he confides. George rarely speaks and is never seen without his toy, Blue Bunny.
Blue Bunny
George's stuffed animal. In a short comic, Blue Bunny is shown in his anthropomorphic form, where he is revealed to be psychotic.
Penrod
Violet's love interest. He doesn't return Violet's affection at all.
Rocky
A caveman mainly concerned with survival, procreation, and other aspects of living in the year 100,000 B.C. He apparently was the first man to arrive at the location of modern-day Ice Haven.
Officer Kaufman
A police officer who appears on and off throughout the book.

== Guilford High School incident ==
The comic generated controversy when Nate Fisher, a high school teacher in Guilford, Connecticut gave Eightball #22 (Ice Haven) to a student as a make-up summer reading assignment. The student's parents had concerns about the book's appropriateness. The superintendent of Guilford High School said the book was inappropriate for 13-year-olds and placed Fisher on leave. Fisher resigned before the matter was fully investigated.
