= Daniel Clowes =

American cartoonist and writer (born 1961)

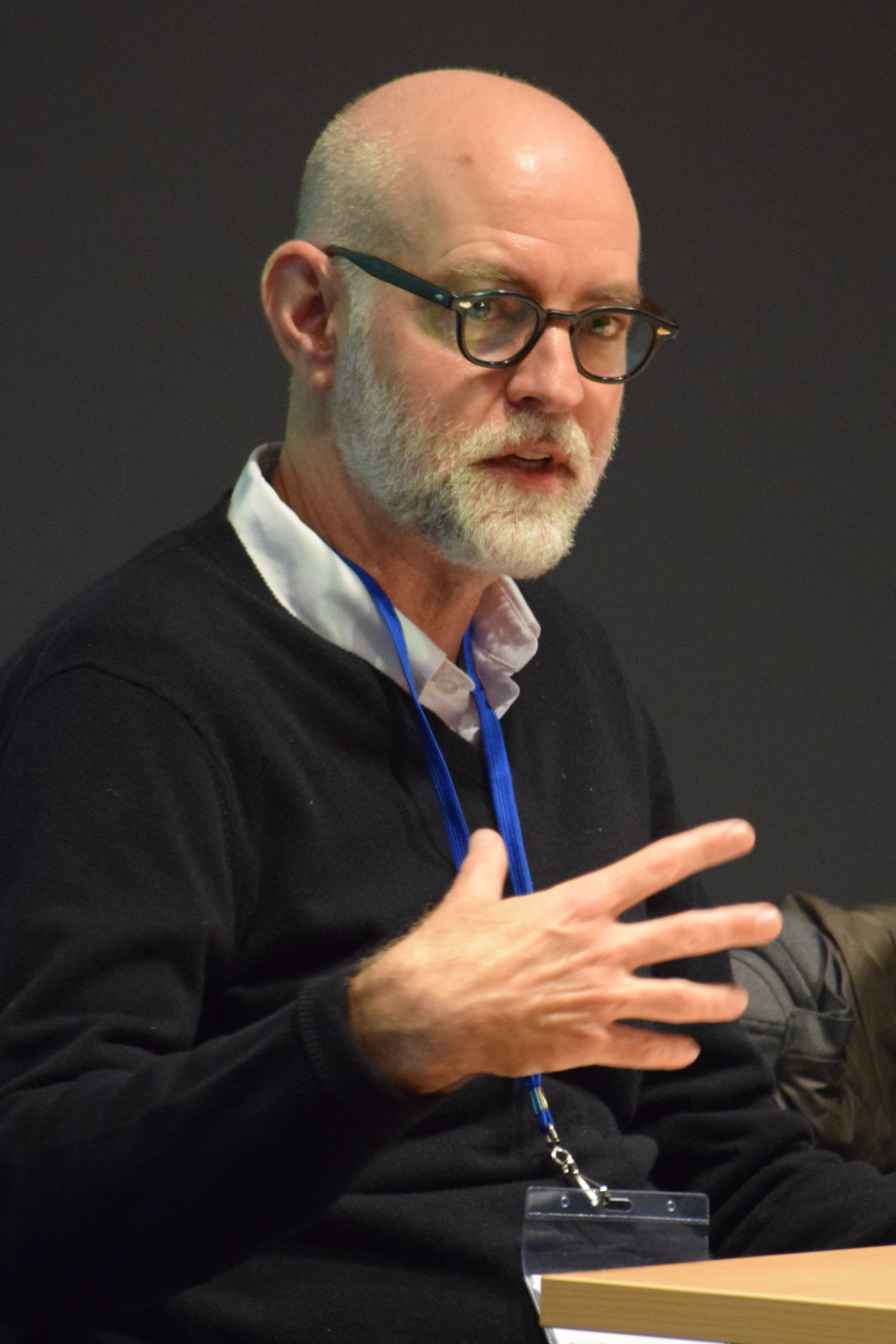
- Clowes in 2019
- Born: Daniel Gillespie Clowes; April 14, 1961 (age 65); Chicago, Illinois, U.S.
- Occupations: Cartoonist; Illustrator; Screenwriter
- Known for: Eightball (1989–2004); Ghost World (1997)
- Spouse: Erika Clowes
- Children: 1

Daniel Gillespie Clowes (/klaʊz/; born April 14, 1961) is an American cartoonist, graphic novelist, illustrator, and screenwriter. Most of Clowes's work first appeared in Eightball, a solo anthology comic book series. An Eightball issue typically contained several short pieces and a chapter of a longer narrative that was later collected and published as a graphic novel, such as Like a Velvet Glove Cast in Iron (1993), Ghost World (1997), David Boring (2000) and Patience (2016). Clowes's illustrations have appeared in The New Yorker, Newsweek, Vogue, The Village Voice, and elsewhere. With filmmaker Terry Zwigoff, Clowes adapted Ghost World into a 2001 film and another Eightball story into the 2006 film, Art School Confidential. Clowes's comics, graphic novels, and films have received numerous awards, including a Pen Award for Outstanding Work in Graphic Literature, over a dozen Harvey and Eisner Awards, and an Academy Award nomination.

== Early life and career, 1961–1988 ==
Clowes was born in Chicago, Illinois, to an auto mechanic mother and a furniture craftsman father. His mother was Jewish, whereas his father was from a "reserved WASPish Pennsylvania" family; Clowes's upbringing was not religious. In 1979, he finished high school at the University of Chicago Laboratory Schools and attended the Pratt Institute in Brooklyn, New York, where he earned a BFA in 1984. It was at Pratt that he met and befriended fellow cartoonist Rick Altergott, who collaborated with Pete Friedrich and Mort Todd to start the small-press comics publisher Look Mom Comics.

According to Clowes scholar Ken Parille, the cartoonist had an early response to a "graphic" comic when, at age four, he burst into tears and began hitting his head against a wall after seeing a cover of a Strange Adventures comic book that depicted a family dying of heat. Later, he received "piles of 1950s and 1960s classic titles like Archie and The Fantastic Four" from his older brother, who also introduced him to the work of legendary cartoonist R. Crumb.

Daniel Clowes's Wilson (2010)

Daniel Clowes and Charles Burns discuss their careers in 2016

Clowes's first professional work appeared in 1985 in Cracked, and he contributed to the magazine until 1989, working under a variety of pseudonyms, most prominently "Stosh Gillespie", and, toward the end of his tenure, under his own name. Clowes and writer Mort Todd co-created a recurring Cracked feature titled The Uggly Family. In 1985, Clowes drew the first comic to feature his character Lloyd Llewellyn. He sent the story to Fantagraphics' Gary Groth, and his work soon appeared in the Hernandez brothers' Love and Rockets #13 (1985). Fantagraphics published six magazine-sized, black-and-white issues of Lloyd Llewellyn in 1986 and 1987; the title was not a commercial success.

== Eightball, 1989–2004 ==
In 1989, Fantagraphics published the first issue of Clowes's comic book Eightball. On issue #1's masthead, Clowes described the anthology as "An Orgy of Spite, Vengeance, Hopelessness, Despair, and Sexual Perversion". Eightball lasted twenty three issues, ending in 2004. One of the most widely acclaimed American alternative comics, it won over two dozen awards, and all of Clowes's Eightball serials have been collected and released as graphic novels.

From #1 to #18, an Eightball issue typically contained short pieces that ranged in genre from comical rant and Freudian analysis to fairy tale and cultural criticism. These issues also featured a chapter of a serial that Clowes later collected as a graphic novel: Like a Velvet Glove Cast in Iron (1993), Pussey! (1995), and Ghost World (1997). With #19, Clowes abandoned the anthology format. The oversized black and white issues #19–21 each contained a single act of Clowes's three-act David Boring, which was released as a graphic novel in 2000. Clowes again changed format with #22. The first full-color Eightball, #22 included a single graphic novel-length story Ice Haven. The final issue, #23 was a full-color, single-story comic The Death-Ray released in 2004.

During the early 1990s, Clowes was associated with Seattle label Sub Pop, creating artwork for recordings by Thee Headcoats, The Supersuckers, The John Peel Sessions, and The Sub Pop Video Program collection. He designed the label's mascot, Punky, who appeared on T-shirts, paddle-balls, watches, and other merchandise. In 1994, Clowes created art for the Ramones video "I Don't Want to Grow Up".

== Post-Eightball, 2005–2023 ==
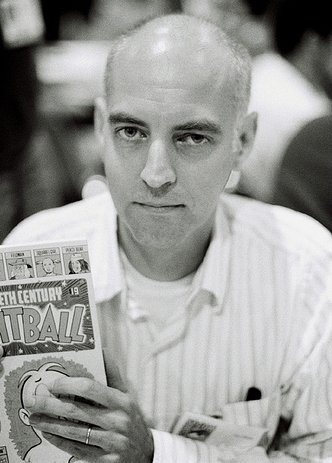
Clowes at the 2006 San Diego Comic-Con

After Eightball ended in 2004, Clowes began to release full-color graphic novels, beginning in 2005 with Ice Haven, a revised version of the comic that appeared in Eightball #22. In 2006, after a health crisis, Clowes underwent open-heart surgery. During this period, Clowes drew the first of several New Yorker covers and contributed comics to Zadie Smith's The Book of Other People (2008) and the influential art comics anthology Kramers Ergot (#7, 2008).

In 2010, Drawn & Quarterly published Wilson, Clowes's first graphic novel that had not been serialized in Eightball. The next year, Pantheon released Mister Wonderful, a revised and reformatted version of a narrative serialized weekly in 2007 and 2008 in The Sunday New York Times Magazine, a story Clowes described as a "romance." 2011 also saw the Drawn & Quarterly hardcover release of The Death-Ray, which first appeared in Eightball #23 (June 2004).

His longest graphic novel, Patience, was released in the US in March 2016. His latest graphic novel Monica was released on October 3, 2023, by Fantagraphics.

Clowes lives in Oakland, California, with his wife Erika and his child.

== Cultural contexts ==
Clowes's work emerged from the late-1980s and early-1990s American alternative comics scene and played an important role in comics achieving a new level of respect from reviewers, academics, and readers. Ghost World was among the earliest American "literary" comics to be marketed and sold through conventional book stores as a graphic novel. (Clowes has been critical of the terms "literary comics" and "graphic novel.") It was presented in serial form within Eightball #11‐#18 (1993‐1997).

Some of his most popular stories, such as Ghost World and "The Party", are associated with Generation X ("The Party" was reprinted in Douglas Rushkoff's 1994 GenX Reader). This movement's investment in post-adolescent aimlessness was one of Clowes's main themes during the 1990s. The cartoonist led the way for comic artists like Adrian Tomine and Craig Thompson, who also focused on the angst of post-adolescent characters.

Like filmmaker David Lynch, Clowes is known for mixing elements of kitsch and the grotesque. Reflecting the cartoonist's interest in 1950s and 1960s TV, film, mainstream and underground comics, and Mad magazine, these elements surface in Clowes's 1990s work, especially his graphic novel Like a Velvet Glove Cast in Iron. During the 1990s, the juxtaposition of kitsch and horror became something of a zeitgeist in visual art, independent film, and post-underground comics.

Clowes's post-2000 graphic novels marked a shift in subject matter and form. Ice Haven, The Death-Ray, Wilson, and Mister Wonderful featured older protagonists and explored issues of masculinity and aging. Like the work of his fellow cartoonists Chris Ware and Art Spiegelman, these comics displayed an interest in American comic-strip history, using layouts, coloring, and drawing styles reminiscent of newspaper cartoons, especially the large early- and mid-20th-century Sunday comic strips.

== Awards ==
Clowes has received dozens of awards and nominations for his comics and film work. In 2002, he was nominated for several awards for the Ghost World film, including an Academy Award for Best Screenplay Based on Material Previously Published, an AFI Award for Screenwriter of the Year, a Chicago Film Critics Association Award for Best Screenplay, and others.

For his comics, Clowes has won many Harvey Awards, including Best Writer in 1997 and 2005; Best Series in 1990, 1991, 1992, and 1997; Best Letter in 1991 and 1997; Best Single Issue or Story in 1990, 1991, 1998 and 2005; and Best Cartoonist in 2002. He has won numerous Eisner Awards, including Best Writer/Artist: Drama in 2000 and 2002; Best Single Issue/Single Story in 2002 and 2005; Best Short Story in 2008; Best New Graphic Album in 2011. In 2011, he won a Pen Award for Outstanding Body of Work in Graphic Literature.

Clowes was given the Inkpot Award in 2006.

Clowes received the prestigious Fauve d'Or for his album Monica at the 51^{e} Édition of the "Festival de la BD d'Angoulême" in January 2024.

== Exhibitions ==
Clowes's original art has appeared in American group shows as well as exhibitions in Belgium, France, Germany, Japan, and elsewhere. His first solo show was held at Los Angeles's Richard Heller Gallery in 2003. In 2012, Susan Miller curated his first museum retrospective, Modern Cartoonist: The Art of Daniel Clowes at the Oakland Museum of California. It featured 100 works, including pencil and ink drawings, color pencil illustrations, and gouache art, with covers for The New Yorker, Eightball issues, and Clowes's graphic novels. The show traveled to the Museum of Contemporary Art, Chicago in 2013, and is at the Wexner Center in Columbus, Ohio, in mid-2014. It may continue on to Europe and Asia.

== Screenwriting ==
In the late 1990s, Clowes began a career as a screenwriter. His first film was 2001's Ghost World. Based on Clowes's comic of the same name and written with director Terry Zwigoff, the film is set in a nondescript American town and follows the misadventures of two best friends, Enid (Thora Birch) and Rebecca (Scarlett Johansson), who detest most of their high school classmates. After graduation they plan on moving in together and avoiding college, but they grow apart as adult pressures take their toll. The girls play a prank on a nerdy record collector named Seymour (Steve Buscemi), who quickly becomes Enid's unlikely friend and confidante, as her relationship with Rebecca deteriorates. Nominated for a host of awards, most notably a 2002 Academy Award for Best Adapted Screenplay, the movie appeared on many 2001 "Best of" lists. In 2001, Fantagraphics published Ghost Word: A Screenplay.

Clowes's second film Art School Confidential was based on the cartoonist's experiences at Pratt Institute in the early 1980s. (Clowes's four-page comic "Art School Confidential" covered some of the same experiences.) Directed by Zwigoff with a script by Clowes, the film follows Jerome (Max Minghella), an art student who dreams of becoming the world's greatest artist. The film was not as well received as Ghost World. In 2006, Fantagraphics published Art School Confidential: A Screenplay. A third adaptation of a Clowes graphic novel, Wilson, directed by Craig Johnson, starring Woody Harrelson, and with Clowes writing the screenplay, was released in 2017.

At least four other film projects have been discussed or partially developed, with one being abandoned and two remaining in limbo for over seven years. Clowes and director Michel Gondry discussed making a film based on Rudy Rucker's novel Master of Space and Time, with Clowes writing and Gondry directing, but the project never advanced beyond this stage; of the film Clowes said, "I actually announced that that wasn't going to be made at the 2006 San Diego [Comic] Con." In 2006, Clowes began writing a script based on his comic The Death-Ray for a movie to be produced by Jack Black's Black and White Productions. Clowes also wrote a screenplay based on the true story of three boys who, over the course of seven years, filmed a shot-for-shot remake of Raiders of the Lost Ark. As of 2018, neither The Death-Ray nor the Raiders project has been greenlit. In 2016, it was announced Clowes will adapt his graphic novel Patience for Focus Features. As of 2018 the project remains in development.

== Plagiarism by Shia LaBeouf ==
In December 2013, Shia LaBeouf's short film Howard Cantour.com became available online. Soon thereafter, those familiar with indie comics noticed its remarkable resemblance to "Justin M. Damiano," a comic Clowes contributed to the 2008 charity anthology The Book of Other People. The short film was then removed by LaBeouf, who claimed that he was not "copying" Clowes, but rather was "inspired" by him and "got lost in the creative process." LaBeouf later issued several apologies on Twitter, writing, "In my excitement and naiveté as an amateur filmmaker, I got lost in the creative process and neglected to follow proper accreditation", and "I deeply regret the manner in which these events have unfolded and want @danielclowes to know that I have a great respect for his work." Clowes responded by saying "The first I ever heard of the film was this morning when someone sent me a link. I've never spoken to or met Mr. LaBeouf ... I actually can't imagine what was going through his mind."

Legal representatives of Clowes also sent a cease-and-desist letter to LaBeouf concerning another tweet stating he intended to make a second film plagiarizing Clowes.

== OK Soda ==
In 1993 and 1994, Clowes created artwork for Coca-Cola's Generation X-inspired beverage OK Soda, which was test-marketed in select American cities in 1994 and 1995 before being discontinued. During this period, along with fellow Fantagraphics artist Charles Burns, Clowes was one of the main illustrators for the company's cans and print materials. Clowes's art appears on two cans/bottles (the face of a young man looking forward; the face of a young woman looking forward), though he is often incorrectly credited for other OK Soda can art.

== Illustrations ==
Clowes has illustrated over 25 LP, EP, and CD covers, including Everything Looks Better in the Dark (1987) by Frank French and Kevn Kinney, Thee Headcoats' Heavens to Murgatroyd, Even! It's Thee Headcoats! (Already), and the Supersuckers album The Smoke of Hell (1992). His artwork can be seen in the Ramones video for their Tom Waits cover "I Don't Want to Grow Up" (1994).

His art appeared on a skateboard deck for Santa Cruz Skateboards (1991 – it was reissued in black and white in 2006).

Clowes drew covers and booklet art for the Criterion Collection's releases of Samuel Fuller's films Shock Corridor and The Naked Kiss (2011). An OK Soda vending machine with Clowes art appears in several shots in Christopher Guest's mockumentary Waiting for Guffman (1997). He created the movie poster for Todd Solondz's film Happiness (1998).

He drew the key art for Season 4 of the HBO series Silicon Valley (2017) and the cover for Encounter Briefs, a fictional comic book featured in Greg Mottola's film Paul (2011).

== Selected works ==
=== Comic books ===
- Lloyd Llewellyn #1–6 (1986–1987) and a special (1988).
- Eightball #1–23 (1989–2004).

=== Graphic novels ===
- Like a Velvet Glove Cast in Iron (Fantagraphics, 1993). Clowes's first graphic novel, this volume collects ten chapters serialized in Eightball #1–10. A surreal narrative partially based on Clowes's dreams, it tells the story of Clay Loudermilk, an alienated young man who searches for his ex-wife after seeing her in a fetish film.
- Pussey!: The Complete Saga of Young Dan Pussey (Fantagraphics, 1995). This collection features Dan Pussey stories that first appeared in Eightball. A satire of the superhero comics industry, it chronicles the life of the title character from his boyhood dreams of being a famous comic-book artist, to success drawing superhero stories, and finally to a rapid fall into obscurity.
- Ghost World (Fantagraphics, 1997). This graphic novel collects the Ghost World chapters from Eightball #11–18. On the first paperback edition's back cover, Clowes includes a brief synopsis: "Ghost World is the story of Enid and Rebecca, teenage friends facing the unwelcome prospect of adulthood and the uncertain future of their complicated relationship." The cartoonist's breakthrough and best-selling work, it has been translated into seventeen languages.
- David Boring (Pantheon Books, 2000). This volume collects David Boring Acts 1–3 from Eightball #19–21. The comic's elaborately plotted narrative explores the title character's search for the perfect woman and his effort to learn about his missing father.
- Ice Haven (Pantheon, 2005). First appearing in Eightball #22, Ice Haven was revised and reformatted for the 2005 collection, with new chapters and redrawn art. Featuring a fictional Midwestern town and a large cast of main characters, the story centers on David Goldberg's kidnapping and the strained interactions of the town's inhabitants.
- Wilson (Drawn and Quarterly, 2010). Wilson is Clowes's first non-serialized graphic novel. Set in Oakland, California, it tells the story of Wilson, a confrontational misanthrope who desires a deep connection with other people, but whose aggressive interpersonal style thwarts such relationships.
- Mister Wonderful (Pantheon Books, 2011). Called "a midlife romance" by Clowes, this volume is an expanded and reformatted collection of a story first serialized in The New York Times Magazine in 2007 and 2008. It won a 2008 Eisner Award for Best Short Story for the serialized version.
- The Death-Ray (Drawn and Quarterly, 2011). Clowes's long-form superhero story, The Death-Ray first appeared in Eightball #23. A formally complex narrative, it recounts the story of Andy, who acquires super-powers and a death ray that he uses, according to the back cover, "in defense of the righteous".
- Patience (Fantagraphics, 2016). Clowes's longest graphic novel, the book is described by the publisher as "a psychedelic science-fiction love story, veering with uncanny precision from violent destruction to deeply personal tenderness in a way that is both quintessentially 'Clowesian' and utterly unique in the author's body of work."
- Monica (Fantagraphics, 2023), a multi-genre exploration of a woman's life and cults, conspiracy theories, and the mid-20th century

=== Anthologies ===
- #$@&!: The Official Lloyd Llewellyn Collection (Fantagraphics, 1989). Clowes's first anthology, this paperback volume collects thirteen stories from the seven Lloyd Llewellyn comics.
- Lout Rampage! (Fantagraphics, 1991). This paperback includes stories from Eightball #1–6, along with strips Clowes created for alternative comics anthologies Blab!, Young Lust, and Weirdo.
- The Manly World of Lloyd Llewellyn: A Golden Treasury of His Complete Works (Fantagraphics, 1994). Clowes's only hardcover anthology, this volume collects all of the Llewellyn stories from the seven Lloyd Llewellyn comics, early Eightball issues, Love & Rockets #13, and elsewhere.
- Orgy Bound (Fantagraphics, 1996). This anthology collects stories from Eightball #7–16, along with one-page strips from Details magazine and National Lampoon.
- Caricature (Fantagraphics, 1998). Subtitled "Nine Stories", Caricature collects comics from Eightball #13–18, along with "Green Eyeliner", the first comic to appear in Esquire's annual fiction issue, commissioned by editor Dave Eggers.
- Twentieth Century Eightball (Fantagraphics, 2002). Focusing on short humor comics, this collection reprints some of the cartoonist's most well-known work, such as "Art School Confidential" and "Ugly Girls". It won a Harvey Award for Best Graphic Album of Previously Published Work in 2003.
- Ghost World: Special Edition (Fantagraphics, 2008). This hardcover collects the Ghost World graphic novel and screenplay, along with other related material.
- The Complete Eightball, #1–#18 (Fantagraphics, 2015). This two-volume hardcover set reprints the first eighteen issues of Clowes's comic-book series.

=== Other appearances ===
- "Justin M. Damiano" in The Book of Other People (2008)

=== Movies ===
- Ghost World (2001)
- Art School Confidential (2006)
- Wilson (2017)

=== Miscellaneous ===
- Cracked – recurring strip "The Uggly Family" (1986–1989)
- Thee Headcoats – Heavens To Murgatroyd, Even! It's Thee Headcoats! (Already) cover (1990)
- Santa Cruz Skateboards – Corey O'Brien full-color deck (1991 – reissued in 2006 in black and white)
- National Lampoon – series of one-page strips (1991)
- Urge Overkill – The Supersonic Storybook cover (1991)
- The Supersuckers – The Smoke of Hell cover (1992)
- Eightball postcard set (1993)
- "Boredom" – a mock board game (1994)
- The John Peel Sub Pop Sessions cover (1994)
- Ghost World: A Screenplay (2001)
- Little Enid Doll (2001–2002) – five versions
- Enid & Rebecca Cloth Dolls (2002)
- Yo La Tengo – Merry Christmas from Yo La Tengo cover (2002)
- Enid Hi-Fashion Glamour Doll (2004)
- Pogeybait Doll (2006)
- Art School Confidential: A Screenplay (2006)
- The New Yorker cover (May 24, 2010)
- Dan DeBono's Indy – created original cover and interviewed

=== Commercial work ===
- OK Soda
