= David Boring =

2000 graphic novel by Daniel Clowes

Cover of the original hardback edition of David Boring

David Boring is a graphic novel by American cartoonist Daniel Clowes. It was serialized in issues #19–21 of Clowes's comic book Eightball and appeared in collected form from Pantheon Books in 2000.

The book depicts the misadventures of its eponymous character, whose main interests are finding the "perfect woman" and learning more about his father, an obscure comic artist whom he has never met. All this occurs in a nameless American city, against the background of a looming conflict involving germ warfare. Trying to imagine what a one-sentence sales pitch for David Boring would sound like, Clowes told an interviewer "It's like Fassbinder meets half-baked Nabokov on Gilligan's Island."

== Publication ==
David Boring's three chapters (which Clowes called "acts") first appeared from May 1998 to February 2000 in issues #19–21 of Clowes's comic book Eightball, published by Fantagraphics Books. Pantheon Books published a hardcover collected version later in 2000 and followed with a softcover version in 2002. The pages were printed in a relatively large 10 1/2-×-7 1/2-inch (27 × 19 cm) format.

== Plot ==
David Boring is a story told in the first person by its eponymous protagonist, concerning his sometimes fantastic and sometimes mundane exploits and misadventures in and out of big city life.

Much of the plot of the book concerns David's attempt to obtain a woman whom he considers his feminine ideal, based largely on the characteristics of his first cousin, Pamela, with whom he shared some innocent adolescent kisses at a family summer retreat. Soon after attending the funeral of a friend, David meets, dates, and is abandoned by Wanda, a woman whom he considers the perfect fulfillment of this ideal. After sinking into an all-consuming depression for weeks, David is shot in the head by an unknown attacker in front of his own home, but survives with only a small dent in his forehead.

David, his mother, their extended family, and David's roommate and friend Dot all end up stranded on a small island, Hulligan's Wharf, which the family owns and uses for vacations. David's great-uncle August shows up, proclaims that terrorist gas attacks have contaminated the mainland, and later dies. While on the island, David has a sexual tryst with his mother's cousin, Mrs. Capon, who later disappears that very night. At the same time, Dot has begun a relationship with Iris, Mrs. Capon's daughter, who is married to Manfred. Manfred tries to kill Dot by drugging her and throwing her into the water while she sleeps, but she wakes up in time to grab Iris, beat up Manfred, and escape by boat.

When word gets around that David suspects Manfred of killing Mrs. Capon as well, Manfred tries to pummel him, but is stopped by Mr. Hulligan, the island's caretaker. When the food runs out, David and Mr. Hulligan are abandoned by Manfred and David's mother, and barely make it ashore on a makeshift raft. They discover (as Mr. Hulligan believed all along) that the terrorist attack was not the world-ending catastrophe August had believed.

David returns home and begins a relationship with a woman named Naomi. He soon discovers that the man who shot him was a professor named Karkes, who was similarly abandoned by Wanda, and assumed that she had left him for David. He and Karkes enter into a strange friendship, discussing their mutual obsession with Wanda and attempting to track her down. In his search, David meets Judy, Wanda's sister, who resembles her strongly. David decides that, contrary to his earlier belief that Wanda was the fulfillment of his ideal, Wanda was in fact merely a flawed version of Judy. His relationship with Naomi falls apart, and she flees to Norway, fearing further terrorist attacks on America.

Judy is attracted to David, but is worried about her husband. After they meet and kiss, her husband shows up at David's apartment and knocks him unconscious with a baseball bat. Meanwhile, Dot's relationship with Iris has failed, and Iris leaves her for Agent Roy Smith, who is investigating the murders of Mrs. Capon and Whitey. Smith resolves to frame David and Dot for Whitey's murder, in order to eliminate any competition for Iris, whom he marries.

David and Karkes track Wanda down to a weird cult commune, finding that Wanda is the only one there, the others having "gone on." Neither David nor Karkes asks what that means. Although David and Karkes agree to "let the best man win," David intends to deceive and defeat Karkes by letting him have Wanda, whom he considers a lesser version of Judy. David loudly and publicly declares his love for Judy, but this only earns him another beating at the hands of her husband.

David aimlessly wanders his way around the docks, where he is tracked down by Smith and his superior, Lieutenant Anemone. Smith tries to shoot David, but only grazes his head before Smith and Anemone are both shot by Dot. The two escape to Hulligan's Wharf, where David finds his long-lost cousin Pamela and her baby. She fled to the island for her child's safety, and has several months of food supply, planning to start a vegetable garden so that they can survive indefinitely. David and Pamela begin an adult relationship.

The group spends more than four months on the island with no sign of the police or poison gas. The occurrence of further terrorist attacks is suggested, but not directly stated. At the book's end, David expresses the conviction that he is happy and thankful, and does not care how long he has to live. The question of whether the pair have days, weeks, months, or years of bliss is never answered.

== Characters ==
- David Boring: David, who gives his birthdate as May 6, 1978, is both the novel's protagonist and narrator. He is very quiet, thoughtful, passive, and is noticeably skinny. At the beginning of the novel he works as a security guard, although he has virtually no capacity for violence. David is an expert pick-up artist, but derives little satisfaction from his conquests and does not boast of them. He is in search of a woman who meets his exacting ideal of female physical beauty. He also aspires to be a moviemaker, although at the book's end he seems to have given up this goal. His only other motivation, it seems, is to learn more about his absent, deceased father, whom he never knew and of whom his mother refuses to talk at length. David tries to learn as much as he can from fragmented pages of a superhero comic his father made, called The Yellow Streak.
- Dot: Dot is David's best friend. She has known him since high school, when they did short movie projects together. Dot is a lesbian, and enjoys the fact that she can peacefully coexist and cohabit with David without any sexual tension. Unfortunately, Dot has a tendency to get involved with women who do not self-identify as lesbian and who are already involved with a man. It also hints at Dot being in love with David, though it is never shown outright. She tries to become close to him and get him to forget Wanda in bed but he gets a migraine interrupting the moment, later she mentions "the complex mechanics of our relationship" indicating there is more than has been shown to the reader, along with the words "when you find a good man you have to do whatever you can to protect him" referring again to her protection of David as more than just a friend.
- Wanda Kraml: A woman with whom David falls in love. Although she appears modest, conservative, and old-fashioned, David later discovers that she has a habit of getting involved with men who become obsessed with her, usually under an assumed personality (her older sister Judy called her a talented actress), later abandoning them. She seems to have patterned the false personality she used in her relationship with David after Judy. This revelation leads David to lose interest in Wanda and fall in love with Judy herself. She later joins a bizarre cult, and at the novel's end, appears to have become involved with Karkes again.
- Ferdinand B. Karkes: A college professor who shares David's obsessive streak, and is similarly obsessed with Wanda. Unlike David, Karkes never gets over his fixation on Wanda, and his obsession has cost him his marriage, his finances, and the respect of his colleagues.
- Whitey Whitman: David's old school friend, whom David describes as "a cynical hayseed with pretensions of urbanity." Whitey gives David a lucky penny, and is subsequently murdered in the street after leaving a woman's apartment.
- Mrs. Boring: David's mother, whom he dislikes. David describes her as "horrible" and she appears to have no interest in relationships with other people. She is angry that David wants to know more about his father, whom she absolutely despises.
- Iris: Manfred's wife and Mrs. Capon's daughter. She gets involved with Dot, but is disgusted with her own homosexual behavior. She later leaves Dot for Agent Roy Smith.
- Manfred Roland Jr.: Iris' abusive husband. He does not get along with her or her family, and later tries to kill Dot. It is strongly hinted that he killed Mrs. Capon.
- Agent Roy Smith: An unscrupulous government agent who falls for Iris, and tries to frame David and Dot for Whitey's murder in order to have her for himself. It is implied that he also has Manfred arrested for the murder of Mrs. Capon after Dot and Iris identify him as her killer.

== Reception and legacy ==
In 2005, Time chose it as one of the 10 Best graphic novels ever written.

== Bibliography ==
- Davis, Anita Price (2012). "David Boring". In Beaty, Bart; Weiner, Stephen (eds.). Critical Survey of Graphic Novels: Independents and Underground Classics. Salem Press. pp. 193–196. ISBN 978-1-58765-950-8.
- Cates, Isaac (2004). "David Boring: Loose Threads and Five Card Nancy". ImageTexT: Interdisciplinary Comics Studies. 1 (1). University of Florida.
- Ivan-Zadeh, Larushka (November 16, 2002). "Fast train to Weirdsville". The Guardian.
- Schneider, Greice (March 17, 2011). "David Boring – Daniel Clowes". The Comics Grid. Archived from the original on April 30, 2011.
