= The Death-Ray =

Graphic novel by Daniel Clowes

The Death Ray
- Cover to the 2011 standalone edition
- Creator: Daniel Clowes
- Date: 2011
- Page count: 41 pages
- Publisher: Drawn & Quarterly

Original publication
- Published in: Eightball (Fantagraphics)
- Issues: No. 23
- Date of publication: 2004

The Death Ray is a graphic novel by American cartoonist Daniel Clowes. It first appeared in 2004, in issue #23 of Clowes's comic book Eightball, and then as a standalone book in 2011.

== Plot ==
The story, which flashes back and forth from the 1970s and present day, revolves around a man Andy who reflects upon his childhood and the events that led to him living a life alone, with no friends or loved ones. Raised by his grandfather after his parents both died (mother from a blood clot in the brain, his father from cancer) when he was young, Andy is bullied by his classmates and dominated by his obnoxious best friend Louie. When he turns seventeen, Andy (who is weak and skinny) begins smoking and suddenly experiences short bursts of what appear, to him, as being super strength. Shortly afterwards, Andy's grandfather provides him with a box containing belongings of his father that he had kept secret. These include a journal, that explain that as a kid, Andy was exposed to experimental hormones by his father to ensure that his son would not be frail and weak like he was. This causes Louie to believe that smoking causes Andy to become super strong. Louie then convinces him to become an amateur super-hero with Louie as his sidekick.

Seeking to find out more about his father, Andy requests that his aunt send him anything that she might have that belonged to his father. His aunt sends him a box that contains a "death ray" that disintegrates anyone shot by its ray.

Much of the story deals with Andy's relationship with his grandfather, who is suffering from the onset of dementia and his housekeeper/grandfathers carer Dinah, whom Andy secretly has a crush on. Louie becomes more and more obsessed with having Andy use the death ray to kill local bullies and troublemakers, such as the abusive father of a girl Louie has a crush on. As Louie and Andy drift apart, Andy befriends Sonny, the ex-boyfriend of Louie's sister who attempts to help Andy cope with his grandfather's mental decline.

Ultimately, Louie attempts to crush Andy's head in with a rock in order to permanently steal the death ray from him. Andy is forced to kill Louie, disintegrating him as a result. Afterwards, Andy's grandfather is placed into a group home, Andy is given custody of Louie's dog by his family (who do not suspect Andy of foul play), and Andy and the dog are forced to leave school in order to move in with his aunt.

The story then skips to the early 2000s; Andy is now in his late 40s and is bitter and cynical about life; twice divorced, he has since adopted Louie's nihilistic view on life and the death ray and repeatedly moves from town to town, to avoid suspicion for the murders he commits with the gun. Having used the death ray to murder the men that both of his wives cheated on him with, and having failed at a relationship with his high school crush Dusty, Andy sold the death ray to a pawn shop and moved on with his life. However, after his neighbor's pit bull murdered Louie's dog and then laughs about it, Andy seeks to retrieve the gun and murder his neighbor. Andy convinces Sonny to help him track down the death ray (which Sonny believes is just a toy gun) and along the way, Sonny visits Dusty for Andy and relays an apology to him for an unstated incident that ended their budding relationship.

Andy murders his neighbor with the death ray, off-panel and ultimately moves back to the town where he grew up. Once he arrives back to the town, Andy meets the main bully who terrorized him growing up and who, in their last meeting, told Andy that he hoped his grandfather would die from his dementia. Andy resists the urge to murder the now grown-up bully, but comments that the bully's now-mature and less-jerkish behavior was a lie.

The story ends with a three part epilogue:

- The first part has the ghosts of four of Andy's victims that Andy murdered for selfish reasons and which he regretted: a drug dealer who sold drugs to Delia's daughter, two of the men who slept with his ex-wives, and Louie.
- Sonny, Dusty, Delia, and Andy's grandfather describing Andy: while Delia and Sonny have favorable views of Andy, Dusty refuses to comment while Andy's grandfather is consumed with sorrow over his grandson being a murderer.
- Three endings for the graphic novel, told in one panel with text that describes the endings:
  - Ending One has Andy going insane and using the Ray Gun to murder every living soul on Earth until only he exists
  - Ending Two has Andy committing suicide and the world going on as normal, with no one ever knowing about Andy's death ray
  - In Ending Three, Andy dates a divorced woman in his apartment building, murdering her ex-husband with the death ray among other people who annoy him. Andy's relationship with the divorced woman eventually fails and he buries the death ray in the woods to avoid any further temptation to use it, after he realizes that he no longer has the available funds to relocate at the drop of a hat. Andy adopts multiple dogs over the coming decades, and ultimately dies from cancer in his late 70s, alone and childless.

The final set of panels has Andy and his dog watching fireworks in the distance, while repeating a mantra from earlier in the book (during a fantasy sequence where Andy imagines life as a super-hero, with Louie as his sidekick) saying that he will always be available to help a stranger out if they are in trouble.

== Reception ==
In 2012, The Death Ray won a Harvey Award for Best Graphic Album of Previously Published Work.
