= Eightball (comics) =

Comic book by Daniel Clowes

- Cover of Eightball #8.

Publication information
- Publisher: Fantagraphics
- Schedule: Irregular
- Format: Ongoing series
- Genre: Alternative comics
- Publication date: October 1989 – June 2004
- No. of issues: 23

Creative team
- Created by: Daniel Clowes
- Written by: Daniel Clowes

Eightball is a comic book by Daniel Clowes and published by Fantagraphics Books. It ran from 1989 to 2004. The first issue appeared soon after the end of Clowes's previous comic book, Lloyd Llewellyn. Eightball has been among the best-selling series in alternative comics.

Early issues of Eightball feature a mixture of very short, often crudely humorous comics ("Zubrick and Pogeybait", "The Sensual Santa"), topical rants and satires ("Art School Confidential", "On Sports"), longer, more reflective self-contained stories ("Caricature", "Immortal Invisible"), and serialized works. The first extended story serialized in Eightball was Like a Velvet Glove Cast in Iron, which ran in issues #1–10. Glove was followed by Ghost World (issues #11–18). Beginning with #19 each issue of Eightball has been devoted to a single storyline, as opposed to the more eclectic format of the earlier issues. Issues #19–21 serialized the graphic novel David Boring, while issues #22 and 23 each consisted of a collection of short, fragmentary stories in diverse styles and formats that meshed into a unified narrative ("Ice Haven" and "The Death Ray"). The issues of Eightball beginning with #19 have been published in full color in a larger magazine-sized format. Eightball #18 included a bound-in copy of Clowes's pamphlet Modern Cartoonist.

== Single issues ==
Issue #	1st Print Date	Stories	Notes
1	Oct - 89	Like a Velvet Glove Cast in Iron, Devil Doll, The Laffin' Spittin' Man, Young Dan Pussey, What is the Most Important Invention of the Twentieth Century?	'Devil Doll' is a parody of several religious tracts by Jack Chick
2	Feb - 90	Like a Velvet Glove Cast in Iron, The Truth, I Hate You Deeply (Lloyd Llewellyn), What Do You Think George Washington's Voice Sounded Like?	
3	Jun- 90	Like a Velvet Glove Cast in Iron, The Stroll, The Young Manhood of Dan Pussey, What Can Robots Do?	
4	Oct - 90	Like a Velvet Glove Cast in Iron, I Love You Tenderly (Lloyd Llewellyn), The Future, Dan Pussey's Masturbation Fantasy, Sexual Frustration, What Do You Do for a Cold?	
5	Oct - 90	Like a Velvet Glove Cast in Iron, Just Another Day, Playful Obsession, Paranoid	
6	Jun - 91	Like a Velvet Glove Cast in Iron, The Dr. Infinity Story (Dan Pussey), Marooned	
7	Nov - 91	Like a Velvet Glove Cast in Iron, Art School Confidential, Chicago	Art School Confidential inspired the 2006 film of the same name. It was directed by Terry Zwigoff and Daniel Clowes wrote the screenplay.
8	Mar - 92	Like a Velvet Glove Cast in Iron, Ugly Girls, Grist for the Mill, Dan Pussey Presents Komic Kollector's Korner, Nature Boy, Give it Up, My Suicide, Dialogues from Duplex Planet	'Ugly Girls' contains a prototype of Enid from Ghost World
9		Like a Velvet Glove Cast in Iron	
10		Like a Velvet Glove Cast in Iron (conclusion)	
11	Jun - 93	Velvet Glove, Ghost World, The Party, The Fairy Frog, The Happy Fisherman, Why I Hate Christians, Ectomorph	"Velvet Glove" is a parody of bad film adaptations, using the just-completed Like a Velvet Glove Cast in Iron as its source, with behind-the-scenes segments showing an increasingly anxious Clowes in talks with a clueless Hollywood producer, and scenes from the resulting movie, in which Clay is a tough, sarcastic police detective who plays by his own rules and makes pithy remarks (such as "what are you lookin' at?") before shooting his enemies. Tina is recast as a space alien who gives "Clay" a ring of power.
12	Nov - 93	Ghost World, Hippypants and Peace Bear, The Origin of Dan Pussey, Glue Destiny	
13	Apr - 94	Ghost World, Buddy Bradley in 'Who Would You Rather Fuck: Ginger or Mary Ann?', Blue Italian Shit, Cool Your Jets, Anomalies and Curiosities of Medicine	The Buddy Bradley story is based on characters by Peter Bagge.
14	no indicia	Ghost World, The Goldmommy, On Sports, The Death of Dan Pussey, The Sensual Santa	
15	Apr - 95	Ghost World, Caricature, Feldman	The Feldman character makes an appearance in the film 'Ghost World'
16	Nov - 95	Ghost World, Squirrel Girl and Candy Pants, Like a Weed, Joe, MCMLXVI, Immortal Invisible	
17	Aug - 96	Ghost World, Gynecology	
18	Mar - 97	Ghost World, Black Nylon, Latch-Key Kid, Modern Cartoonist	Modern Cartoonist is a pamphlet included with the comic
19	May - 98	David Boring, Act I	
20	Feb - 99	David Boring, Act 2	
21	Feb - 00	David Boring, Act 3	
22	Oct - 01	Ice Haven	
23	Jun - 04	Death Ray	

== Book collections ==
- Lout Rampage! (Fantagraphics, 1991, ISBN 978-1-56097-070-5) – Short stories
- Like a Velvet Glove Cast in Iron (Fantagraphics, 1993, ISBN 1-56097-116-9) – Graphic novel
- Pussey!: The Complete Saga of Young Dan Pussey (Fantagraphics, 1995, ISBN 978-1-56097-183-2) – Stories featuring Clowes' character Dan Pussey
- Orgy Bound (Fantagraphics, 1996, ISBN 978-1-56097-302-7) – Short stories
- Ghost World (Fantagraphics, 1997, ISBN 1-56097-427-3) – Graphic novel
- Caricature (Fantagraphics, 1998, ISBN 978-1-56097-329-4) – Short stories
- David Boring (Pantheon Books, 2000, ISBN 978-0-375-40692-8) – Graphic novel
- Twentieth Century Eightball (Fantagraphics, 2002, ISBN 978-1-56097-436-9) – Short stories
- Ice Haven (Pantheon, 2005, ISBN 978-0-375-42332-1) – A reformatted version of the contents of Eightball #22
- The Complete Eightball 1–18 (Fantagraphics, 2015, ISBN 978-1-60699-757-4)

== Film adaptations ==
Ghost World was adapted by Clowes and director Terry Zwigoff into a 2001 feature film of the same name, for which Clowes and Zwigoff were nominated for an Academy Award for screenplay writing. Additionally, the 2006 Clowes/Zwigoff film Art School Confidential was loosely based on a short story of the same name which appeared in Eightball #7.

== Controversy ==
The comic generated controversy when a high school teacher in Guilford, Connecticut gave Eightball #22 (Ice Haven) to a student as a make-up summer reading assignment. The parents of the student had concerns about the book's appropriateness. The superintendent of Guilford High School said the book was inappropriate for 13-year-olds and placed the teacher on leave. The teacher resigned before the matter was fully investigated. The Guilford school district and principal were criticized for getting police involved and trying the issue in a "kangaroo court".
