= Ghost World (comics) =

Graphic novel by Daniel Clowes

- The latest cover art for Ghost World
- Creator: Daniel Clowes
- Date: 1997
- Publisher: Fantagraphics Books

Original publication
- Published in: Eightball
- Issues: 11–18
- Date of publication: Sep 7, 1993 – Apr 19, 1997
- Language: English
- ISBN: 1-56097-280-7 (hardcover); 1-56097-427-3 (softcover)

Ghost World is a graphic novel by Daniel Clowes. It was serialized in issues #11–18 (June 1993 – March 1997) of Clowes's comic book series Eightball, and was published in book form in 1997 by Fantagraphics Books. It was a commercial and critical success and developed into a cult classic.

Ghost World follows the day-to-day lives of best friends Enid Coleslaw and Rebecca Doppelmeyer, two cynical, pseudo-intellectual, and intermittently witty teenage girls recently graduated from high school at the end of the 1990s. They spend their days wandering aimlessly around their unnamed American town, criticizing popular culture and the people they encounter while wondering how they will live out their lives.

A darkly written comic, with intermittently sombre explorations of friendship and modern life, Ghost World has become renowned for its frank treatment of adolescence. The comic's success led to a movie adaptation of the same name, released in 2001 to critical acclaim and numerous nominations, including a nomination for the Academy Award for Best Adapted Screenplay, written by Clowes and Terry Zwigoff.

== Overview ==
Ghost World takes place in an unnamed suburban town filled with shopping malls, fast food restaurants, and urban sprawl. The town plays a key part in the narrative, as it is constantly mocked and criticized by Enid and Rebecca. As the story progresses, the background changes dramatically. The phrase "Ghost World" is seen by the characters several times, painted or graffitied on garage doors, signs, and billboards for an undeclared reason. The term can also apply to the way in which both Enid and Becky, but especially Enid, are haunted by the past. In the special features of the film adaptation, it is said to refer to the fact that the town's individuality is being encroached upon by franchises that are seen everywhere.

Critical response to Ghost World was extensive: many critics praised it for its analysis of teenage life, relationships, and the decay of today's society, while others criticized it for being disconnected and morbid. Some reviews drew comparisons to J. D. Salinger's The Catcher in the Rye (1951). The Village Voice stated that "Clowes spells out the realities of teen angst as powerfully and authentically as Salinger did in Catcher in the Rye for an earlier generation". The Guardian praised the strip's illustrations and visuals, saying "it is beautifully drawn, with subtle and convincing storylines. A classic portrait of teenage life" and Time magazine called it an "instant classic".

== Synopsis ==
Enid Coleslaw (her father had their surname legally changed from "Cohn" before she was born) and Rebecca (Becky) Doppelmeyer are two cynical, intelligent teenage girls who are best friends in the 1990s. They have recently graduated from high school and spend their days wandering around their unnamed town criticizing pop culture and the people they encounter while wondering how they will live out their lives. They are attracted to boys, but also unhappily entertain the possibility that they might be lesbians. Their friendship is very close, but as the book goes on tensions between them build, especially over Enid's plans to move away to college. They also have a quiet friend named Josh; throughout the book the two girls enjoy teasing him, but they are also attracted to him and eventually a romantic triangle forms. The comic ends with Enid and Rebecca separating; while they speak half-heartedly of "getting together sometime", the easy intimacy they once knew is long gone. Rebecca is now in a relationship with Josh and seems on her way to settling into a normal life, while Enid, having failed to get into college, is as much of a misfit as ever and finally leaves town alone to start a new life.

== Characters ==
=== Enid Coleslaw ===
Impulsive, cynical, foul-mouthed and bitter, the strip's lead character drifts through her life without care, criticizing almost everyone she meets. Enid Coleslaw is an 18-year-old, who has recently graduated from her high school, with best friend Rebecca Doppelmeyer. Enid takes an interest in playing pranks on other people, purely for her own benefit, especially a classmate named Josh who she attempts to seduce. Clowes said of Enid's character: "When I started out I thought of her as this id creature... Then I realized halfway through that she was just more vocal than I was, but she has the same kind of confusion, self-doubts and identity issues that I still have – even though she's 18 and I'm 39!"

Enid (as well as Rebecca) makes a cameo appearance as an old lady in Clowes's Pussey collection of comics. Pussey is a self-important, nerdy superhero comics artist, and the book ends in the future as Pussey dies alone and unloved, with Rebecca and Enid as two bitter crones in his rest home going through his possessions. When they discover his stash of "silly books" (comic books), they wonder, "What would a grown man want with such foolishness?" Enid Coleslaw is also an anagram of "Daniel Clowes".

=== Rebecca Doppelmeyer ===
Rebecca Doppelmeyer is Enid's best friend. Rebecca lives with her grandmother and acts as a caretaker to her. She has a bit more of a mainstream personality – while Enid enjoys more peculiar things in life, Rebecca enjoys things that most teenage girls of her age would take an interest in; for example, she reads a popular teen magazine, and is also more interested in men, and is described by Enid as "a skinny blonde WASP" and therefore embodies "what every guy wants." Rebecca and Enid spend much of the novel hanging out around the town together and making fun of others. In the end of the novel, Rebecca matures into a sensible young woman and pursues a relationship with Josh in place of her friendship with Enid as the two characters grow apart as they mature from teenagers into young adults.

=== Minor characters ===
Beyond Enid and Rebecca, there are many minor and recurring characters in the comic strip:

- Josh, a soft-spoken employee at a self-service convenience store. Both Enid and Rebecca are infatuated with him at different points in the story.
- Melorra, an overachieving, perky and popular classmate of Enid and Rebecca who seems to unexpectedly appear out of the blue wherever Enid and Rebecca may be.
- Bob Skeetes, an astrologer that early in the book is referred to as the "creepy Don Knotts guy".
- Oomi, Rebecca's fragile old grandmother, with whom Rebecca lives.
- Norman, an old man who waits on a bench for a bus that never comes.
- Enid's somewhat effeminate father and his girlfriend Carol, who resurfaces from Enid's past.
- Allen, or "Weird Al", the waiter at the fake 1950s diner called Hubba Hubba (the name is changed to Wowsville in the film).
- John Ellis, an enemy of Enid and Becky's, who often associates with them despite their dislike of him. John Ellis is obsessed with morbid and offensive things, such as Nazis, serial killers, child pornography, guns, circus freaks, torture, snuff films, and so forth. He is referred to as having a zine called Mayhem which runs stories on these topics.
- Johnny Apeshit, a former punk rocker and heroin addict turned would-be businessman, who is famous among the girls for spray painting the word "anarchy" on Enid's dad's car.
- Naomi, a classmate of Enid and Rebecca, called along with Melorra by Enid, "the junior JAPs of America". Enid tells Naomi the story of her first sexual experience and suggests that the two have a casual friendship.
- Allen Weinstein, the boy with whom Enid had her first sexual experience. He smokes marijuana, listens to reggae and is interested in counterculture as a way of rebelling against his wealthy parents.
- The Satanists, a middle-aged couple who eat at the diner Enid frequents, Angel's. They may not actually be satanic, but rather appear that way in Enid's imagination (probably due to the fact that the male of the relationship bears a resemblance to Anton LaVey).

== History ==
Ghost World was first conceived in the early 1990s by Daniel Clowes. The comic is partially inspired by Clowes's own life; for example, Clowes moved from Los Angeles to San Francisco, and he has said that the town in the story is a visual combination of both places. Most of the novel was not written in chronological order. Clowes began writing Ghost World on September 9, 1993, and stated that he created the first chapter without any plans to continue it.

Clowes also credits as having drawn some inspiration from the film The World of Henry Orient, in which two curious young girls stalk a middle-aged man who is having an affair. In the book, Enid and Rebecca are obsessed with various strange people in the neighborhood, including "The Satanists" and a psychic named Bob Skeetes.

Many readers have tried to interpret where the title Ghost World comes from; Clowes has said it comes from something he saw scrawled on a building in his Chicago neighborhood. A graffito reading "Ghost World" is seen by the characters on the side of a building in an early installment of the comic; Enid actually reads it aloud as they walk past it. Some of the references in the book (Sassy, etc.) date the book very specifically to the 1990s, which Clowes has said was intentional. He wanted to emulate the way that throwaway cultural references in The Catcher in the Rye root the novel in a time and place.

The series was a major departure for Clowes, who had previously populated Eightball with considerably more outlandish material. Clowes has said in interviews that he chose two teenage girls for his protagonists partly because he could use them to express his more cynical opinions without readers taking the characters as author surrogates.

== Artwork and illustration ==
Clowes's original Ghost World strips were printed in black and pale blue, with the blue tones giving the pages a distinctive twilight-like appearance. The coloring evokes the ghostly blue light cast by television screens in darkened rooms, an effect that recurs throughout the series. Clowes used Rubylith overlays to produce the blue tones, a technique he had learned in art school.

=== Differences between the comic book version and the graphic novel ===
Clowes made various changes to the artwork between the original issues and the book collection, such as changing Becky's face early in the story so it more closely matches her appearance at the end.

The comics as they originally appeared in Eightball employed only two colors; the early chapters were in black and dark blue, then black and a lighter shade of blue later on, and black and light green for the final two chapters. The graphic novel reprint uses this light green and black color scheme throughout. There is one inadvertent exception: in Eightball #16, a printing error led to the entire chapter being published in an orange tone instead of a blue one. "No one quite knows how or why this happened," wrote Clowes in The Complete Eightball, a 2015 compilation of the comic that faithfully reproduces the mistake.

The character design also changed significantly during the original run of the story, with characters' faces becoming cleaner and less detailed, indicative of a shift in Clowes's changing aesthetic in all his comics, eschewing the minute facial details that had long been one of his trademarks, for more simplified designs. The character of John Ellis, for example, had significant shading and cross-hatching on his face in the original comics, where in the book he has a simpler, uncluttered design. Another striking example is a panel on the second page of the first chapter that shows Rebecca reading a magazine. In the original comic, her eyes and chin are shaded in, her hair reaches her shoulders, and she appears to be scowling. In the graphic novel, this panel was redrawn, softening and lightening Rebecca's features. Enid's appearance was also reworked in this panel, and in several others in the first chapter of the book.

The graphic novel includes five new drawings on the copyright, table of contents, acknowledgments, and other prefatory pages. These new drawings are tableaux of events in the characters' lives that take place prior to the story, including their high school graduation, and a graveyard visit, presumably either for Rebecca's parents (who are never seen or mentioned in the story, though the girl lives with her grandmother) or Enid's mother (who is similarly absent). The graduation scene, which shows the two girls in caps and gowns, and Enid giving the finger, was recreated in the film version.

As with Like a Velvet Glove Cast in Iron, the chapters of the story were given names in the novel, and a table of contents was added to reflect this.

== Film adaptation ==
The book was made into a 2001 film, Ghost World, directed by Terry Zwigoff (also known for his award-winning documentary about underground cartoonist Robert Crumb). Thora Birch played Enid, Scarlett Johansson played Rebecca, and Steve Buscemi played Seymour (a composite character, based on elements from the comic characters of Bob Skeetes and Bearded Windbreaker). Josh was played by Brad Renfro.

== Merchandise and spin-off material ==
A collection of merchandise and spin-off material for Ghost World has been sold since its release, some of it still available today. This includes three alternate versions of dolls of Enid. One is available from Fantagraphics with artwork by Clowes depicting Enid having various adventures, and comes with objects featured in the comic (such as the mask she buys from the pornographic store), another "Little Enid" from the Eightball comic, and an Enid/Rebecca pairing with the likeness of voodoo dolls.

In 2008, Clowes and Fantagraphics published a "special edition" of Ghost World (ISBN 978-1-56097-890-9), which included the original graphic novel, the screenplay for the 2001 film adaptation, and "dozens of pages of never-before-collected ephemera, including unused concept drawings, notes, movie posters, foreign edition covers, merchandise, artwork created for the movie by Clowes, Sophie Crumb and the cast, and much more, all annotated by Clowes."

== Works influenced ==
The comic was the influence for Aimee Mann's song "Ghost World" on her album Bachelor No. 2 (2000).

== Collections ==
- Hardcover Edition: ISBN 1-56097-280-7 Fantagraphics Books (December 1, 1997)
- Paperback Edition: ISBN 1-56097-427-3 Fantagraphics Books; 4th edition (April 1, 2001)
- Paperback Edition: ISBN 1-56097-427-3 Fantagraphics Books; 13th edition (December 2005)
