= Ignatz Award for Outstanding Story =

US comics and cartooning award

Ignatz Award
- Awarded for: Outstanding achievements in comics and cartooning by small press creators or creator-owned projects published by larger publishers
- Location: Bethesda, Maryland
- Country: United States
- Presented by: Ignatz Award Committee
- Hosted by: Small Press Expo
- First award: 1997

Highlights
- Most wins: Daniel Clowes; Jaime Hernández; Kevin Huizenga
- Website: www.smallpressexpo.com/ignatz-awards

The Ignatz Award for Outstanding Story, established in 1997 as part of the Ignatz Awards, is an annual literary award that recognizes outstanding achievements in comics and cartooning by small press creators or creator-owned projects published by larger publishers. The award for outstanding graphic story is presented "for outstanding storytelling in a comic". The award can go to "an individual issue within a series, a one shot or a single story within an anthology".

== Recipients ==
Award winners and finalists
Year	Creator(s)	Work	Publisher	Result	Ref.
1997	Alan Moore and Eddie Campbell	From Hell	Kitchen Sink Press	Winner	
1997	Joe Chiappetta	"A Death In the Family", Silly Daddy	Self-published	Finalist	
1997	Daniel Clowes	"Ghost World", Eightball	Fantagraphics	Finalist	
1997	Dylan Horrocks	"Hicksville", Pickle	Black Eye Productions	Finalist	
1997	Seth	"It's a Good Life, If You Don't Weaken", Palookaville	Drawn & Quarterly	Finalist	
1998	Daniel Clowes	"Ghost World", Eightball	Fantagraphics	Winner	
1998	Chris Ware	"Jimmy Corrigan", Acme Novelty Library	Fantagraphics	Finalist	
1998	Gilbert Hernández	"Letters from Venus", New Love	Fantagraphics	Finalist	
1998	Julie Doucet	"New York City Diary", Dirty Plotte	Drawn & Quarterly	Finalist	
1998	Joe Sacco	"Soba", Stories From Bosnia	Drawn & Quarterly	Finalist	
1999	Daniel Clowes	"David Boring", Eightball #20	Fantagraphics	Winner	
1999	Budd Root	Cavewoman: Jungle Tales	Basement Comics	Finalist	
1999	Scott Roberts	"Over the Line", Patty-Cake and Friends #13	Slave Labor	Finalist	
1999	David Lapham	"Sex & Violence: Part 2", Stray Bullets #18	El Capitan Books	Finalist	
1999	David Choe	"Slow Jams", Non #3 & #4	Red Ink	Finalist	
2000	Chris Ware	"Jimmy Corrigan, the Smartest Kid on Earth", Acme Novelty Library	Fantagraphics	Winner	
2000	Brian Ralph	Cave-In	Highwater Books	Finalist	
2000	Alan Moore and Eddie Campbell	From Hell	Eddie Campbell Comics, distributed by Top Shelf Productions	Finalist	
2000	Androo Robinson	Jug	Self-published	Finalist	
2000	Jason	"The Bridge", Mjau Mjau #6	Jippi Forlag	Finalist	
2001	2001 Ignatz Awards cancelled after 9-11 Attacks				
2001	Rutu Modan	"Bygone", Flipper Vol. 2	Actus Tragicus/Top Shelf Productions	Finalist	
2001	Mike Kunkel	Herobear and the Kid #2	Astonish Comics	Finalist	
2001	Sean Bieri	"Popeye the Savior Man", Jumbo Jape	Self-published	Finalist	
2001	Tom Hart	"Stocks Are Surging", The Collected Hutch Owen	Top Shelf Productions	Finalist	
2001	Lewis Trondheim	The Nimrod No. 5	Fantagraphics Books	Finalist	
2002	Scott Mills	Trenches	Top Shelf Productions	Winner	
2002	Megan Kelso	"Retreat", Artichoke Tales #1	Highwater Books	Finalist	
2002	Mira Friedmann	"Royal Sable", Actus Box Series	Actus Tragicus	Finalist	
2002	Kurt Wolfgang	"Where Hats Go", Non #5	Red Ink Press	Finalist	
2002	Ron Regé Jr.	"Wir Mussën Wissen, Wir Werden Wissen (We Must Know, We Will Know)", Drawn & Quarterly #4	Drawn & Quarterly	Finalist	
2003	Jason Shiga	Fleep	Sparkplug Comic Books	Winner	
2003	Gilbert Hernández	"30,000 Hours to Kill", Love & Rockets #6	Fantagraphics Books	Finalist	
2003	Charles Burns	Black Hole #10	Fantagraphics Books	Finalist	
2003	R. Crumb	"Hipman", Mystic Funnies #3	Fantagraphics Books	Finalist	
2003	Jason	"Untitled Second Story", Sshhhh!	Fantagraphics Books	Finalist	
2004	Kevin Huizenga	"Glenn Ganges", Drawn & Quarterly Showcase, Vol. 1	Drawn & Quarterly	Winner	
2004	Jaime Hernández	"Maggie", Love and Rockets v.2 #8	Fantagraphics Books	Finalist	
2004	Michel Rabagliati	"Paul in the Metro", Drawn & Quarterly #5	Drawn & Quarterly	Finalist	
2004	David Heatley	"Portrait of My Dad", McSweeney's Quarterly Concern #13	McSweeney's	Finalist	
2004	Nick Bertozzi	"The Little Things", Rubber Necker #3	Alternative Comics	Finalist	
2005	Anders Nilsen	Dogs and Water	Drawn & Quarterly	Winner	
2005	Gilbert Hernández	"Dumb Solitaire", Love and Rockets #11, #13	Fantagraphics	Finalist	
2005	David Collier	"Homme De Le Bois", The Frank Ritza Papers	Drawn & Quarterly	Finalist	
2005	Joel Priddy	"Onion Jack", Superior Showcase	AdHouse Books	Finalist	
2005	Dennis P. Eichhorn and J. R. Williams	The Legend of Wild Man Fischer	Top Shelf Productions	Finalist	
2006	Kevin Huizenga	Ganges #1	Fantagraphics Books	Winner	
2006	Joe Daly	"Prebaby", Scrublands	Fantagraphics Books	Finalist	
2006	Sammy Harkham	"Somersaulting", Drawn & Quarterly Showcase #3	Drawn & Quarterly	Finalist	
2006	Andrice Arp	"To Capt. Ayres", MOME Winter 2006	Fantagraphics Books	Finalist	
2006	Miriam Katin	We Are On Our Own	Drawn & Quarterly	Finalist	
2007	Gabrielle Bell	"Felix", Drawn & Quarterly Showcase, Vol. 4	Drawn & Quarterly	Winner	
2007	Richard Sala	Delphine #1–2	Fantagraphics Books/Coconico Press	Finalist	
2007	Anders Nilsen	Don't Go Where I Can't Follow	Drawn & Quarterly	Finalist	
2007	John Hankiewicz	"Martha Gregory", Asthma	Sparkplug Comic Books	Finalist	
2007	Anders Nilsen	The End	Fantagraphics Books/Coconico Press	Finalist	
2008	Lilli Carré	The Thing About Madeleine	Self-published	Winner	
2008	MK Reed and Jonathan Hill	"Americus", Papercutter #7	Tugboat Press	Finalist	
2008	Onsmith	"The Candy Rod", Hotwire Comics #2	Fantagraphics Books	Finalist	
2008	Dash Shaw	"The Galactic Funnels", Mome #11	Fantagraphics Books	Finalist	
2008	Chris Wright	"The Urn", Inkweed	Sparkplug Comic Books	Finalist	
2009	Damien Jay	"Willy", Papercutter #10	Tugboat	Winner	
2009	Hideo Azuma	Disappearance Diary	Fanfare/Ponent Mon	Finalist	
2009	Chris Ware	"Seeing Eye Dogs of Mars", Acme Novelty Library #19	Drawn & Quarterly	Finalist	
2009	Lilli Carré	"The Carnival", Mome #14	Fantagraphics	Finalist	
2009	Amanda Vähämäki	"Untitled", Drawn & Quarterly Showcase Book 5	Drawn & Quarterly	Finalist	
2010	Ken Dahl	Monsters	Secret Acres	Winner	
2010	Joe Daly	"John Wesley Harding", The Red Monkey Double Happiness Book	Fantagraphics Books	Finalist	
2010	James Sturm	Market Day	Drawn & Quarterly	Finalist	
2010	Sully	"Turd Place", The Hipless Boy	Conundrum Press	Finalist	
2010	Laura Park	"Untitled", Mome #16	Fantagraphics Books	Finalist	
2011	Jaime Hernández	"Browntown", Love and Rockets: New Stories #3	Fantagraphics	Winner	
2011	Sammy Harkham	"Blood of the Virgin", Crickets #3	Self-published	Finalist	
2011	Chris Ware	"LINT", Acme Novelty Library #20	Drawn & Quarterly	Finalist	
2011	Jonas Madden-Conner	"The most gripping mind-exploding triumphantly electric of our time", Papercutter #15	Tugboat Press	Finalist	
2011	Eric Orner	"Weekends Abroad", Three #1	Self-published	Finalist	
2012	Jaime Hernández	"Return to Me", Love and Rockets: New Stories #4	Fantagraphics	Winner	
2012	Nick Drnaso	"Keith or Steve", Mome #22	Fantagraphics	Finalist	
2012	Jason Martin and Jesse Reklaw	"The Weeper", Papercutter #17	Tugboat Press	Finalist	
2012	Matthew Thurber	1 800 Mice	Picturebox	Finalist	
2012	Ludovic Debeurme	Lucille	Top Shelf	Finalist	
2013	John Martz	Gold Star	Retrofit Comics	Winner	
2013	Tom Hart	"Arid", Secret Prison #7	Retrofit Comics	Finalist	
2013	Joanna Helgren	"Neighbors", Tusen Hjärtan Stark #1	Domino Books	Finalist	
2013	Dan Zettwoch	Birdseye Bristoe	Drawn & Quarterly	Finalist	
2013	Lilli Carré	"The Carnival", Heads or Tails	Fantagraphics	Finalist	
2014	Meredith Gran	"Brownout Biscuit", Octopus Pie	Dead Forever	Winner	
2014	John Martz	Destination X		Finalist	
2014	Simon Hanselmann	"Jobs", Life Zone		Finalist	
2014	Sam Sharpe	"Mom", Viewotron #2		Finalist	
2014	Nick Drnaso	"The Grassy Knoll"		Finalist	
2015	Jillian Tamaki	"Sex Coven", Frontier #7		Winner	
2015	Dash Shaw	Doctors		Finalist	
2015	Michael DeForge	"Me As a Baby", Lose #6		Finalist	
2015	Marguerite Van Cook and James Romberger	Nature Lessons from The Late Child And Other Animals		Finalist	
2015	Kris Mukai	Weeping Flower, Grows in Darkness		Finalist	
2016	Noah Van Sciver	My Hot Date		Winner	
2016	Kim Deitch	"Shrine of the Monkey God", Kramers Ergot #8		Finalist	
2016	Adrian Tomine	Killing and Dying		Finalist	
2016	Simon Hanselmann	"Megg & Mogg in Amsterdam", Megg & Mogg in Amsterdam and Other Stories		Finalist	
2016	Joe Sparrow	The Hunter		Finalist	
2017	Carolyn Nowak	Diana's Electric Tongue		Winner	
2017	John Lewis, Nate Powell, and Andrew Aydin	March: Book 3		Finalist	
2017	Emil Ferris	My Favorite Thing is Monsters		Finalist	
2017	Dustin Harbin	"Small Enough", Diary Comics		Finalist	
2017	Maddi Gonzalez	"Too Hot to Be Cool", Elements		Finalist	
2018	Lee Knox Ostertag	How the Best Hunter in the Village Met Her Death		Winner	
2018	Michael DeForge	Rhode Island Me		Finalist	
2018	Tommi Parrish	The Lie and How We Told It		Finalist	
2018	Eleanor Davis	Why Art?		Finalist	
2018	Yvan Alabge	Yellow Negroes and Other Imaginary Creatures		Finalist	
2019	Mariko Tamaki and Rosemary Valero-O'Connell	Laura Dean Keeps Breaking Up with Me		Winner	
2019	Liz Suburbia	Sacred Heart Vol 2 Part 1: Livin' in the Future		Finalist	
2019	Sarah Winifred Searle	Sincerely, Harriet		Finalist	
2019	Vannak Anan Prum	The Dead Eye and the Deep Blue Sea		Finalist	
2019	Aminder Dhaliwal	Woman World		Finalist	
2020	Eleanor Davis	The Hard Tomorrow		Winner	
2020	Ezra Claytan Daniels and Ben Passmore	BTTM FDRS		Finalist	
2020	Gabrielle Bell	"Little Red Riding Hood"		Finalist	
2020	Allison Conway	The Lab		Finalist	
2020	Melissa Mendes	The Weight #9		Finalist	
2021	Freddy Carrasco	Personal Companion		Winner	
2021	Raquelle Jac	Misguided Love		Finalist	
2021	Yeong-shin Ma	Moms		Finalist	
2021	Ancco	Nineteen		Finalist	
2021	Stan Stanley	The Hazards of Love		Finalist	
2022	Beatrix Urkowitz	The Lover of Everyone in the World	Parsifal Press	Winner	
2022	Liz Yerby	Big Cats	Self-published	Finalist	
2022	Jordan Jeffries	Ley Lines: Love, or the Axe	Grindstone Comics & Czap Books	Finalist	
2022	Keren Katz	Ley Lines: The First Few Bars	Grindstone Comics & Czap Books	Finalist	
2022	Mississippi	"Winter Break 2029", Invisible Parade	Glacier Bay Books	Finalist	
2023	Robyn Smith and Jamila Rowser	Wash Day Diaries	Chronicle Books	Winner	
2023	Richard Mercado	I Owe it to My Parents to NOT Come Out	Self-published	Finalist	
2023	Koyubi	"Impatient Ms. S", Glaeolia 3	Self-published	Finalist	
2023	Lily Thu Fierro and Generoso Fierro	Inversion	Self-published	Finalist	
2023	Kit Anderson	Weeds	Parsifal Press	Finalist	
2024	Sami Alwani	"The Happy Art", Pulping	Pulping Collective	Winner	
2024	Leela Corman	"And When I See You, You'll Tell Me Everything", You Are Not a Guest	Fieldmouse Press	Finalist	
2024	Corinne Halbert	Scorpio Venus Rising #1	Self-published	Finalist	
2024	Jamila Rowser and Sam Wade	The Gift	Black Josei Press	Finalist	
2024	Patrick McDonnell	The Super Hero's Journey	Abrams	Finalist	
2025	Leo Fox	Boy Island	Silver Sprocket	Winner	
2025	Allison Conway	A Pillbug Story	Black Panel Press	Finalist	
2025	Olivia Stephens	Ballad for Black Cassandra	Self-published	Finalist	
2025	Zoe Persico	How to Talk to Your Succulent	Tundra	Finalist	
2025	Spire Greenwood and Eve Greenwood	Ruin of the House of the Divine Visage	Self-published	Finalist	
2026	Jesse Lonergan	Drome	23rd Street	Winner	
2026	Sophia Glock	Before We Wake	Little, Brown Ink	Finalist	
2026	Glynnis Fawkes	Mudhouse	Paper Rocket Minicomics	Finalist	
2026	Michael R. Barton	Suicidals	Self-published	Finalist	
2026	Sorina Vazelina	While We Wait	Self-published	Finalist	

== Writers with multiple wins ==
The following writers have won the award more than once:

Two

- Daniel Clowes
- Jaime Hernández
- Kevin Huizenga

== Writers with multiple nominations ==
The following writers have received two or more nominations:

Four

- Chris Ware

Three

- Daniel Clowes
- Lilli Carré
- Gilbert Hernández
- Jaime Hernández
- Anders Nilsen

Two

- Gabrielle Bell
- Eddie Campbell (Note: Alan Moore and Eddie Campbell have been jointly nominated twice.)
- Allison Conway
- Joe Daly
- Eleanor Davis
- Michael DeForge
- Nick Drnaso
- Simon Hanselmann
- Sammy Harkham
- Tom Hart
- Kevin Huizenga
- Jason
- John Martz
- Alan Moore
- Dash Shaw
