= Hotwire =

Hotwire or hot wire may refer to:

== Technology ==
- Hot-wiring, a method of starting a car with no key
- Hot-wire foam cutter, a tool used to cut foam and polystyrene
- Hot wire (electricity), a wire conductor with non-zero potential in electric power distribution
- Hot-wire anemometer, an electrical device for measuring the speed of airflow

== Music ==
- Hotwire (band)
- Hot Wire (Trapeze album), 1974
- Hot Wire (Kix album), 1991
- Hot Wires, a 1987 album by Roy Buchanan

== Other ==
- Hotwire.com, an Internet-based travel agency
- HotWired, an internet magazine
- Hotwire (comics), a Radical Comics series by Warren Ellis and Steve Pugh
