= Little Pollon =

Japanese manga series

- Italian-language edition memorial box, #1 DVD cover

おちゃめ神物語コロコロポロン (Ochamegami Monogatari Korokoro Poron)
- Genre: Adventure, comedy
- Manga
- Written by: Hideo Azuma
- Published by: Akita Shoten
- Magazine: Princess
- Original run: 1977 – 1979
- Volumes: 2
- Anime television series
- Directed by: Takao Yotsuji
- Studio: Kokusai Eiga-sha
- Original network: Fuji TV
- Original run: May 8, 1982 – March 26, 1983
- Episodes: 46

Little Pollon (Note: The opening song spells out the word in English letters as P-O-L-O-N and displays it on screen.) (Japanese: おちゃめ神物語コロコロポロン, Hepburn: Ochamegami Monogatari Korokoro Poron; lit. "Roly-Poly Pollon – The Story of a Bratty Goddess") is a musical Greek mythology-based Japanese anime series, based on the 1977 manga series Olympus no Pollon (オリンポスのポロン, Orinposu no Poron; "Pollon of Olympus") by Hideo Azuma. The anime television series aired in 1982 on Fuji TV lasting 46 episodes. The series is noted for its faithful portrayal of the gods of Mount Olympus as fallible beings succumbing to real human faults and weaknesses, such as selfishness, temper tantrums, debauchery, laziness, and vanity.

== Story ==
The main character of the story is Pollon, a sweet, precocious little girl who is the daughter of the God of the Sun, Apollo. Pollon's goal in life is to grow up to become a beautiful and powerful goddess. She attempts to do good deeds and help out any way she can in order to achieve the status of godhood. Invariably, her overtures backfire and end up causing major trouble for both the gods of Olympus and their human subjects, but Pollon's kind heart, perseverance and indomitable spirit win out in the end, as she attains the title of "Goddess of Hope".

== Characters ==
Pollon
Voiced by: Masako Miura
The daughter of Apollo, the sun-god, she is a kind-hearted but somewhat naive girl who wants to be a goddess when she grows up, but her attempts to prove herself worthy of the title of goddess usually result in disasters of comic proportions.
Eros
Voiced by: Keiko Yamamoto
The God of Love, and Pollon's cousin and best friend, he shoots heart-tipped arrows at people to make them fall in love, but as he is quite an ugly creature, he ironically has no girlfriend of his own.
Apollo
Voiced by: Akio Nojima
Pollon's father and also Eros' uncle, the God of the Sun, he is a lazy drunk who is somewhat neglectful of his daughter. His main job is to drive the Sun's chariot across the sky each day, but as he is often too lazy and/or drunk to do so, Pollon often ends up driving the chariot herself.
Zeus
Voiced by: Masashi Amenomori
The king of the gods, father of Apollo and grandfather of Pollon. Despite his advanced age, he has a strong attraction to younger women, which often gets him in trouble with his wife, Hera.
Hera
Voiced by: Eiko Yamada
The queen of the gods, mother of Apollo and grandmother of Pollon, she is portrayed as the stereotypical hen-pecking wife, somewhat neurotic and given to temper tantrums, and often responds violently to her husband Zeus' flirtatious ways.
Artemis
Voiced by: Rumiko Ukai
The Goddess of the Moon, one of Pollon's aunts.
Aphrodite
Voiced by: Yōko Kawanami
The Goddess of Beauty, and another of Pollon's aunts, she is also the mother of Eros. Aphrodite is beautiful and vain, and spends hours admiring herself in the mirror. She's ashamed of her unattractive son and frequently disowns him.
Poseidon
Voiced by: Banjō Ginga
The God of the Sea is very tall in stature, towering way over the other gods. Although he is the god of the sea, he ironically can't swim.
Atlas
Voiced by: Shigeru Chiba
Atlas is the Titan who holds the weight of the sky. It is shown that he is ticklish.
Hephaestus
Voiced by: Kenichi Ogata
God of smiting and Aphrodite's husband, he's an amiable, if bumbling, inventor, but he dislikes most of the other male gods, especially Apollo, because they're more handsome than him.
Athena
Voiced by: Kachiko Hino
The armor-clad goddess of wisdom and war, she is of the most serious and wise characters in the cast, but others dislike her prickly attitude.
Dionysus
Voiced by: Masaharu Satō
God of wine and merrymaking, he's a bald, stout man with dark glasses. He's never seen without a bottle in his hand. The other gods much enjoy his company (and the wine he brews).
Hades
Voiced by: Naoki Tatsuta
God of the underworld, he reigns unopposed over his realm with his wife Persephone. They enjoy inflicting the most absurd punishments and tortures on the damned.
Dr. Nahaha
Voiced by: Shingo Kanemoto
A somewhat modern-looking scientist. Bumbling and foolish, he genuinely believes himself the "sanest person in this crazy world of fools". He tries to help Pollon by providing her with concoctions and potions that, according to him, could potentially solve every trouble Pollon meets in her adventures, but they always fail to provide the intended effect. He also provides Pollon with a powder able to induce happiness and euphoria.
Dosankos
Voiced by: Masaharu Satō
Apollo's horse.
The Sun
Voiced by: Kōzō Shioya
The long-suffering Sun is often ripped, torn or otherwise disturbed by Pollon and/or the other gods. He has become a heavy smoker to deal with the stress in his life.
Azuma Bug
Voiced by: Hiroshi Ōtake
A cute little insect author surrogate who tells the story of Pollon and the gods as it unfolds.
The Goddess of Goddesses
Voiced by: Hiromi Tsuru
An anime-exclusive character that serves as a mentor to Pollon.

== Overseas distribution ==
In addition to its success in Japan and the United States, Little Pollon has been a successful television program in France on La Cinq in the late 1980s under the title La Petite Olympe et les Dieux, with Pollon's name changed to "Olympe". In Italy, the series was successfully broadcast in Italia 1, with the title C'era una volta... Pollon, and it has regular reruns. In Spain, the series was broadcast with the name La Pequeña Polon; in the region of Catalonia, it was known as La Petita Polon, and was also distributed on VHS in Spanish. Only 24 episodes of the 46 were dubbed in Spanish and Catalan.

Enoki Films USA holds the U.S. license to the anime series.

The Little Pollon production team followed up the series in 1983 with another anime based on a Hideo Azuma manga, Nanako SOS. In one scene in Nanako SOS, the Little Pollon anime is being played on television.
