= 2019 Governor General's Awards =

Canadian literary award

The shortlisted nominees for the 2019 Governor General's Awards for Literary Merit were announced on October 2, 2019, and the winners were announced on October 29.

== English ==
Category	Winner	Nominated
Fiction	Joan Thomas, Five Wives	Michael Crummey, The Innocents; Cary Fagan, The Student; Marianne Micros, Eye; K. D. Miller, Late Breaking
Non-fiction	Don Gillmor, To the River: Losing My Brother	Brian Harvey, Sea Trial: Sailing After My Father; Naomi K. Lewis, Tiny Lights for Travellers; Alan Walker, Fryderyk Chopin: A Life and Times; Dan Werb, City of Omens: A Search for the Missing Women of the Borderlands
Poetry	Gwen Benaway, Holy Wild	Julie Bruck, How to Avoid Huge Ships; Karen Houle, The Grand River Watershed: A Folk Ecology; Catherine Hunter, St. Boniface Elegies; Armand Garnet Ruffo, Treaty #
Drama	Amanda Parris, Other Side of the Game	Kevin Loring, Thanks for Giving; Hannah Moscovitch, What a Young Wife Ought to Know; Sean Harris Oliver, The Fighting Season; Tetsuro Shigematsu, 1 Hour Photo
Children's literature	Erin Bow, Stand on the Sky	Brian Francis, Break in Case of Emergency; Sue Farrell Holler, Cold White Sun; Michelle Kadarusman, Girl of the Southern Sea; Jo Treggiari, The Grey Sisters
Children's illustration	Sydney Smith, Small in the City	Isabelle Arsenault, Albert's Quiet Quest; Cary Fagan and Dena Seiferling, King Mouse; Julie Flett, Birdsong; Nicola Winstanley and John Martz, How to Give Your Cat a Bath in Five Easy Steps
French to English translation	Linda Gaboriau, Birds of a Kind (Wajdi Mouawad, Tous des oiseaux)	Louisa Blair, 887 (Robert Lepage, 887); Sheila Fischman, Vi (Kim Thúy, Vi); Rhonda Mullins, The Embalmer (Anne-Renée Caillé, L'embaumeur); Pablo Strauss, Synapses (Simon Brousseau, Synapses)

== French ==
Category	Winner	Nominated
Fiction	Céline Huyghebaert, Le drap blanc	Edem Awumey, Mina parmi les ombres; Sylvie Drapeau, La terre; Éléonore Goldberg, Maison fauve; Mariève Maréchale, La Minotaure
Non-fiction	Anne-Marie Voisard, Le droit du plus fort : nos dommages, leurs intérêts	Daniel Canty, La Société des grands fonds; Sarah Brunet Dragon, Cartographie des vivants; Antonine Maillet, Clin d'œil au Temps qui passe; Patrick Moreau, La prose d'Alain Grandbois. Ou lire et relire Les voyages de Marco Polo
Poetry	Anne-Marie Desmeules, Le tendon et l'os	Michel Létourneau, La part habitée du ciel; Louise Marois, La cuisine mortuaire; Louis-Thomas Plamondon, Portages; Chloé Savoie-Bernard, Fastes
Drama	Mishka Lavigne, Havre	Évelyne de la Chenelière, La vie utile, précédé de Errance et tremblements; Rachel Graton, La nuit du 4 au 5; Lisa L'Heureux, Et si un soir; Annick Lefebvre, ColoniséEs
Children's literature	Dominique Demers, L'albatros et la mésange	Lucie Bergeron, Dans le cœur de Florence; Édith Bourget, Où est ma maison?; Pierre Labrie, Mon cœur après la pluie; Jean-François Sénéchal, Au carrefour
Children's illustration	Stéphanie Lapointe and Delphie Côté-Lacroix, Jack et le temps perdu	Simon Boulerice and Josée Bisaillon, Le pelleteur de nuages; Stéphanie Deslauriers and Geneviève Després, Laurent, c'est moi!; Mélanie Leclerc, Contacts; Lucie Papineau and Lucie Crovatto, L'escapade de Paolo
English to French translation	Catherine Leroux, Nous qui n'étions rien (Madeleine Thien, Do Not Say We Have Nothing)	Nicolas Calvé, L'animal langage : la compétence linguistique humaine (Charles Taylor, The Language Animal); Lori Saint-Martin and Paul Gagné, Le Yiddish à l'usage des pirates (Gary Barwin, Yiddish for Pirates); Madeleine Stratford, Pilleurs de rêves (Cherie Dimaline, The Marrow Thieves); Sophie Voillot, Onze jours en septembre (Kathleen Winter, Lost in September)
