= Mahōtsukai Chappy =

Japanese anime television series

- Mahou Tsukai Chappy
- Chappy (girl on the left) and friends

魔法使いチャッピー
- Genre: Magical girl
- Anime television series
- Directed by: Yugo Serikawa; Hiroshi Ikeda (2 episodes), etc.
- Written by: Shun'ichi Yukimuro (1 episode); Masaki Tsuji (head writer)
- Studio: Toei Animation
- Original network: NET
- Original run: April 3, 1972 – December 25, 1972
- Episodes: 39

Mahōtsukai Chappy or Chappy the Witch (魔法使いチャッピー) (shortly known as Chappy) is a Japanese anime television series that debuted in TV Asahi (formerly known as NET, or Nihon Educational Television) in 1972. It is the fifth magical girl anime in history (the sixth if one counts Osamu Tezuka's Marvelous Melmo), and the fifth produced by the Toei Animation studio. While the show was fairly popular, it was not as popular as Toei's earlier magical-girl series, and is relatively obscure compared to its predecessors.

In addition to its success in Japan, Chappy has been dubbed into Italian, French and Spanish and broadcast on TV in Italy and various Latin American nations such as Mexico, Peru, Chile and Guatemala. The French dub, made in the early 1990s by AB Productions, was never aired, possibly due to mediocre reception for earlier majokko series of the same vintage (such as Mahō no Mako-chan and Majokko Megu-chan) on French television.

A manga adaptation of the story was drawn by Hideo Azuma, who later created his own magical girl series, Nanako SOS, in 1983.

Chappy, along with other Toei's magical girls such as Akko-chan, Sally, Cutie Honey, Megu-chan, Lunlun, and Lalabel, is a playable character in the 1999 Sony PlayStation game Majokko Daisakusen: Little Witching Mischiefs.

The series was released in a box set in Japan on DVD by ICF Co., Ltd. in December 2005.

== Plot ==
Chappy's story is much like Sally's of Sally the Witch. Chappy, becoming sick of the old customs of her people, left the Land of Magic for the human world. Her family soon sees how much she has in the other realm and decides to join her there. Chappy is known for being the first witch to use a wand (actually a magical baton, given to her by her grandfather). Her special chant is "Abura Mahariku Maharita Kabura". Chappy's closest human friends are the tomboy Michiko and the girly-girl Shizuko, much like her predecessor Sally's friends Yotchan and Sumire.

In a nod to the ecological concerns of the early 1970s, the series featured one noteworthy episode late in the show's run, written by Shukei Nagasaka, which dealt with issues like pollution and the use of natural resources. The show is also notable for featuring several Disney references, including a reference to the 1959 film Sleeping Beauty in one episode, and for the panda mascot character, Don-chan, introduced to cash in on a panda mini-craze in 1972 in Japan (which also informed Hayao Miyazaki's Panda! Go, Panda!).

== Cast ==
- Eiko Masuyama as Chappy Hans Charles Grimm and Aesop Et Cetera
- Sachiko Chijimatsu as Jun Hans Charles Grimm and Aesop Et Cetera
- Kōji Yada as Mr. Hans Charles Grimm and Aesop Et Cetera
- Noriko Watanabe as Mrs. Hans Charles Grimm and Aesop Et Cetera, Shizuko
- Kōsei Tomita as Don, Grandpa
- Nobuyo Tsuda as Obaba
- Ogushi Yoko as Michiko
- Masako Nozawa as Ipei
- Sumiko Shirakawa as Nihei

== Characters ==
- Chappy is a little witch who becomes bored of the Magic World, and escapes to Earth. She uses magic with her grandfather's baton.
- Jun is Chappy's little brother who is able to transform into different animals. He always wants to ride Don-chan's magical car.
- Don-chan is a talking red panda who rides around in a magical car.
- Mr. and Mrs. Hans Charles Grimm and Aesop Et Cetera are Chappy and Jun's parents, who decide to live in the human world.
- Grandpa is Chappy and Jun's grandfather, who is constantly yelling at his son and cares deeply for Chappy.
- Obaba is the oldest witch and is a type of guardian to Chappy's family, but has no blood relation to them.
- Michiko is Chappy's first friend on Earth and a tomboy, who keeps her two little brothers in line. Her father owns a dry cleaning business.
- Ipei and Nihei are Michiko's two little brothers and they are both trouble makers and are close with Jun.
- Shizuko is the local girly-girl and is one of Chappy's classmates and close friends.

== Episode list ==
No.	Title
1	The Magical Family is Here
2	My Friend is a Monster
3	What is, Daddy?
4	Comparing the Nature of Man
5	Don-chan's Sister
6	Reclaim Mommy
7	500m to Glory
8	Cannot Return to the Magical World
9	The Targeted Baton
10	Phantom D51
11	Three Wishes
12	Compare the Wishes of Grandma
13	Daddy's Diary
14	Ghost Disturbance in the Hostel
15	My Favorite Principal for the Day
16	Girl from the Magical Hill
17	Thank you, Daddy
18	Adventure on the Isolated Island
19	Baby-napper
20	Hello, Phoenix
21	Homerun Leader
22	The Dolphin Paradise
23	The Festival
24	The Demon that Run Away
25	Don's Rainbow
26	The Bicycle that Flies into the Sky
27	Don Flood
28	Independence! Waste Park
29	Prince of the Animals
30	Please Wait, Otamgetter!
31	The Distinguished Granny
32	Yearning of Kyoto
33	Apple Village, Apple Apple Showdown
34	Come Out for the Sword Fight
35	Money and Friendship
36	Jump! The Ultra Revolution
37	Farewell, Yukinko
38	Thinking of Christmas
39	Where Are You Going, Chappy?

== Music ==
Japanese title	English title	Artist	Description
Mahō Tsukai Chappy	Chappy the Witch	Shingazu Suri	Opening theme
Don-chan no Uta	Don-chan's Song	Kōsei Tomita	Ending theme
Mahou no Warutsu	Magical Waltz	Kumiko Onoki	Insert song (final episode)

Theme is written by Keiko Osonoe and music composed by Hiroshi Tsutsui.

== Anime staff ==
- Planning: Takashi Iijima, Shinichi Miyazaki (NET)
- Production supervisor: Masaharu Eto
- Episode direction: Yugo Serikawa, Mineo Kachita, Hiroshi Ikeda, Katsutoshi Sasaki, Masayuki Akihi, Osamu Kasai, Yoshihiro Kaneko, Tsunekiyo Otani, Takashi Kuoka, Hiromi Yamamoto, Tomoharu Katsumata, Kiyoshi Tanaka, Bondo Eiju, Minoru Okazaki, Nobuo Onuki, Hideo Furusawa, Kazuya Miyazaki
- Script: Masaki Tsuji, Saburo Taki, Shunichi Yukimuro, Noboru Shiroyama, Jiro Yoshino, Kuniaki Oshikawa, Koji Natsume, Shukei Nagasaka
- Animation direction: Shinya Takahashi, Takao Hanata, Bondo Eiju, Shingo Araki, Katsuya Oda, Teruo Hosoda, Takashi Abe, Teruo Kogure, Takao Kozai, Eiji Uemura, Minoru Tajima, Hideo Furusawa, Fumio Eto
- Art director: Makoto Yamazaki, Saburo Yokoi, Eiji Ito, Mataharu Urata, Shigeyoshi Endo
- Music: Hiroshi Tsutsui
