= Marianne Micros =

Canadian writer (born 1943)

Marianne Micros (born 1943) is a Canadian writer. A retired professor of English at the University of Guelph, her debut short story collection Eye was shortlisted for the 2019 Danuta Gleed Literary Award, and for the Governor General's Award for English-language fiction at the 2019 Governor General's Awards.

Micros previously published two poetry collections, Upstairs Over the Ice Cream (1979) and Seventeen Trees (2007), and has had both her poetry and short fiction published in literary magazines and anthologies.

== Publications ==
- Upstairs over the ice cream, 1979
- Al Purdy : an annotated bibliography, 1980
- The creative circus book, 1984
- Seventeen Trees, 2007
- Eye, 2018
