= Pinky Malinky =

American animated television series

- Genre: Surreal comedy Mockumentary
- Created by: Chris Garbutt; Rikke Asbjoern
- Voices of: Lucas Grabeel; Nathan Kress; Diamond White
- Theme music composer: Dave Newby; Chris Garbutt
- Composer: Dave Newby
- Country of origin: United States
- Original language: English
- No. of seasons: 1 (possibly 3 parts)
- No. of episodes: 60

Production
- Executive producers: Scott Kreamer; Chris Garbutt (S2–3); Rikke Asbjoern (S2–3); Jamie LeClaire; Kyle Mac Dougall; Phil LaFrance
- Producer: Louis J. Cuck
- Running time: 3 minutes (pilot); 12 minutes (series)
- Production company: Nickelodeon Animation Studio

Original release
- Network: Netflix
- Release: January 1 – July 17, 2019

Pinky Malinky is an American animated television series created and produced by Nickelodeon Animation Studio for Netflix. It is based on Chris Garbutt's animated short of the same name produced by Cartoon Network Studios Europe (now Hanna-Barbera Studios Europe), which was released in 2009. It marks the first collaboration between Nickelodeon and Netflix as well as the first Nicktoon to be produced exclusively for Netflix. The series chronicles the adventures of Pinky Malinky (voiced by Lucas Grabeel), a 12-year-old middle school student who also happens to be an anthropomorphic hot dog and his efforts to climb up the social ladder with his two human friends Babs Byuteman (Diamond White) and JJ Jameson (Nathan Kress).

The series premiered on January 1, 2019. It was renewed for a second part ahead of the series premiere. Part 2 was released on April 22, 2019, and the third and final part was released on July 17, 2019.

Pinky Malinky was nominated for Best Animation Editing for the 2020 Daytime Emmy Awards on May 21, 2020. In 2023, Grabeel reprised his role as Pinky in the Netflix interactive special We Lost Our Human which is also by Garbutt and Asbjoern. In this interactive, Pinky calls himself Panky Malanky and classifies himself as a meatball.

== Production ==
In 2015, the series was greenlit by Nickelodeon for a pickup of 20 episodes. The series was originally set to premiere on Nickelodeon in 2016, but went through many delays. On June 21, 2018, it was announced that Pinky Malinky would be released exclusively on Netflix, and that the show was renewed for a second season. The company's See What's Next Twitter account announced an August 17 release date, but the series failed to premiere on that date. On September 16, 2018, Chris Garbutt posted on Instagram that there was a slight delay in the release date, and that it was Netflix's responsibility on when to release it.

Season 1 was eventually released on January 1, 2019, followed by season 2 on April 22 of the same year (with a half-hour episode dropping on June 10), and season 3 on July 17. A 99-second short focusing on the titular character's New Year's resolutions was released ahead of the series premiere.

== Characters ==
=== Main ===
- Pinky Malinky (voiced by Lucas Grabeel) is a 12-year-old anthropomorphic talking hot dog. He is a very intelligent, happy-go-lucky person that has a mission to make people dream big.
- JJ Jameson (voiced by Nathan Kress) is one of Pinky's best friends. He is described as the wise mentor of the trio, claiming to know everything. He is a social media geek as well. He carries his phone almost everywhere and uses more modern slang than Pinky and Babs.
- Babs Buttman (voiced by Diamond White) is one of Pinky's best friends. She likes kitties and cats, and sometimes she acts like them. Babs is Pinky's biggest cheerleader and supports him and his ideas. She is silly, funny and has a "heart of gold".

=== Recurring ===
==== Pinky's family ====
- Eric Malinky (voiced by Danny Jacobs) is Pinky's stay-at-home father and Valerie's husband. He is a simple man with a whole lot of drive. He tends to focus on one task at a time, and won't stop until said task is done right.
- Valerie Malinky (voiced by Retta) is Pinky's mother and Eric's wife. Unlike Eric, Valerie is loud and outspoken. She is also the owner of Crumbbells, a bakery and gym that is located in downtown Sackenhack.

==== Babs's family ====
- Bob Buttman (voiced by Vargus Mason) is Babs's older brother and legal guardian. Bob works as a policeman. He has a friendly, ongoing and naive (sometimes even blunt) personality. In the episode "Birthday", it is revealed that Bob loves to party, but when he parties too much, his alter-ego "Party Bob" breaks out.
- Mr. Dog (voiced by Dee Bradley Baker) is Babs's and Bob's white old english sheepdog. In the episode "Dog", it is revealed that Mr. Dog is actually a woman and she gave birth to many puppies.

=== Sackenhack Junior High ===
==== Students ====
- Tina (voiced by Lauren Tom) is one of Pinky’s classmates. She is the head cheerleader for SJH’s cheerleading squad, "The SnowBallers". She is also shown to have a crush on Pinky in 'Spirit'.
- Channing (voiced by Robbie Daymond) is one of Pinky’s classmates and Byron’s best friend. He and Byron were voted "Most Cutest Couple of SJH", and they would often call each other names ("baby", "pumpkin", etc.).
- Grey Griffin as:
  - Dizzy Brentwood, one of Pinky’s classmates who occasionally likes gossip.
  - Zeek Maloney, one of Pinky’s classmates and Aminder’s girlfriend, who owns a fashion website called "Fash Foward", which JJ occasionally looks upon for latest fashions.
  - Byron, one of Pinky’s classmates and Channing’s best friend. He and Byron were voted "Most Cutest Couple of SJH", and they would often call each other names ("baby", "pumpkin", etc.).
  - Suzie, a teen who works everywhere in Sackenhack.
- Aminder (voiced by Angela Malhotra) is one of Pinky’s classmates and Zeek’s girlfriend. Much like Zeek, she loves clothing. In “Sarcasm”, she is known for being “The Sarcasm Queen”. She was named after Aminder Dhaliwal, who is a writer on the show.
- Perry (voiced by Robbie Daymond) is one of Pinky’s classmates. He is also a cheerleader for The SnowBallers, and lives with his divorced mother.

==== Staff ====
- Principal Pfunne (voiced by Colleen Smith) is the hardcore principal of Sackenhack Junior High.
- Nurse Sally (voiced by Scott Kreamer) is the cynical doctor at Sachenhack Junior High.

== Voice cast ==
- Lucas Grabeel as Pinky Malinky
- Nathan Kress as JJ Jameson
- Diamond White as Babs Buttman
- Retta as Valerie Malinky
- Danny Jacobs as Eric Malinky
- Grey Griffin as Suzie, Dizzy, Zeek, Byron
- Vargus Mason as Bob Buttman
- Angela Malhotra as Aminder
- Jason Alexander as Mayor Hop
- Scott Kreamer as Nurse Sally
- Dee Bradley Baker as Mr. Dog, Peter
- Ben Schwartz as Coach Freebird
- Flula Borg as Byonk
- Carlos Alazraqui as Large Biker Guy
- Fred Tatasciore as Jimmy
- Josh Engel as Mr. Sweetie
- Zehra Fazal as Aisha
- Eric Bauza as Flynn
- Kimberly Brooks as Carl, Sophie
- Stephanie Sheh as Jessie
- Carl Weathers as The Apologizer
- Amy Sedaris as Helga Hilltop
- Lucas Grabeel as Freddy Fistburger

== Episodes ==
=== Series overview ===
Season	Episodes		Originally released
Pilot			March 14, 2009
1	28		January 1, 2019
2	17	16	April 22, 2019
2	17	1	June 10, 2019
3	15		July 17, 2019

=== Pilot (2009) ===
No.	Title	Written by	Storyboarded and Directed by	Original release date
0	"Pinky Malinky"	Chris Garbutt and Rikke Asbjoern	Chris Garbutt	March 14, 2009
Pinky tries to make it to class without being assaulted by the school bully.

=== Part 1 (2019) ===
No. overall	No. in season	Title	Directed by	Written by	Storyboarded by	Original release date
1	1	"Snack"	Neil Graf	Jen Bardekoff, Nick Arciaga, and Neil Graf	Nick Arciaga	January 1, 2019
When the citizens of Sackenhack riot after their favorite snack food Poppins is discontinued, Pinky, Babs and JJ attempt to reverse engineer the recipe to save the town.
2	2	"Pet"	Neil Graf	Sheela Shrinivas, Rikke Asbjoern, and Maha Tabikh	Maha Tabikh	January 1, 2019
While volunteering at the animal shelter with Babs and her dog, Pinky decides to get a pet of his own and ends up adopting a ferocious wildcat.
3	3	"Tech"	Megan Nicole Dong	Jen Bardekoff and Dodge Greenley	Dodge Greenley	January 1, 2019
Pinky introduces his Mom to the wonders of technology and play a VR game Happy Rainbow Family Time but grows concerned when she starts putting her new tech before her family.
4	4	"Spirit"	Megan Nicole Dong	Fred Belford and Dodge Greenley	Dodge Greenley	January 1, 2019
It's School Spirit Week at Sackenhack Junior High and Pinky believes that head cheerleader Tina is low on spirit, unaware that her strange behavior is actually because of her crush on him.
5	5	"Hater"	Megan Nicole Dong	Sheela Shrinivas and Dodge Greenley	Dodge Greenley	January 1, 2019
Pinky's daily Sackenhack posts receive their first hater, who Pinky, Babs and JJ try to convert into a liker.
6	6	"Video"	Tom Parkinson	Fred Belford and Ethan Hegge	Ethan Hegge	January 1, 2019
After Babs and JJ tell Pinky they think their newest video is "almost perfect", Pinky turns to his classmates for advice on how to turn it into a perfect video.
7	7	"Duck"	Megan Nicole Dong	Jen Bardekoff and Dodge Greenley	Dodge Greenley	January 1, 2019
The town's favorite duck King Sackenquack is dead and to spare everyone's feelings Pinky tries to keep up the illusion that he is still alive.
8	8	"Mannequin"	Neil Graf	Sheela Shrinivas and Nick Arciaga	Nick Arciaga	January 1, 2019
JJ dreams of being featured on his favorite fashion blog but his dream outfit doesn't fit so Pinky comes up with a plan to make him more like a store mannequin.
9	9	"Secret"	Megan Nicole Dong	Sheela Shrinivas, Rikke Asbjoern, and Aminder Dhaliwal	Aminder Dhaliwal	January 1, 2019
Pinky becomes obsessed with a korean series Cutie Sweetie, But Wait! Who is Father? but forces himself to binge watch it in secret when he finds out that Babs and JJ hate the show.
10	10	"Scary"	Neil Graf	Fred Belford and Maha Tabikh	Maha Tabikh	January 1, 2019
Pinky and Babs try to help JJ overcome his fear of scary movies by scaring the "scared" out of him.
11	11	"Book"	Neil Graf	Jen Bardekoff, Neil Graf, and Mike Bertino	Neil Graf and Mike Bertino	January 1, 2019
Pinky accidentally takes a book from the library without checking it out and plans a break in to put it back without anyone noticing.
12	12	"Team"	Tom Parkinson	Scott Kreamer, Matt Layzell, and Josh Engel	Josh Engel	January 1, 2019
Hoping to lead them to their first ever win, Pinky joins the Sackenhack Junior High football team.
13	13	"Game"	Megan Nicole Dong	Byron Dockins and Dodge Greenley	Dodge Greenley	January 1, 2019
Pinky and Babs try to make a role playing game more extreme when Pinky worries JJ's new jacket will make him too cool to continue playing with them.
14	14	"Undercover"	Tom Parkinson	Fred Belford and Ethan Hegge	Ethan Hegge	January 1, 2019
Pinky creates a case for Bob to solve so that he can prove to his supervisor that he is a good security guard.
15	15	"Fun"	Neil Graf	Sheela Shrinivas, Neil Graf, and Sarah Soh	Neil Graf, Sarah Soh, and Mike Bertino	January 1, 2019
After learning that his fellow students dread being sent to the principal's office, Pinky tries to make strait-laced Principal Pfunne more fun.
16	16	"Brother"	Neil Graf	Sheela Shrinivas, Neil Graf, and Sarah Soh	Neil Graf, Sarah Soh, and Mike Bertino	January 1, 2019
When JJ accidentally calls Pinky's mom "Mom" during a sleepover, the two decide to take their friendship to the next level by becoming brothers.
17	17	"Sensei"	Megan Nicole Dong	Chris Garbutt and Josh Engel	Josh Engel	January 1, 2019
Pinky joins the school's taekwondo club where he vows to be the perfect student, a goal that is soon taken advantage of by Coach Freebird.
18	18	"Hangout"	Neil Graf	Fred Belford and Nick Arciaga	Nick Arciaga	January 1, 2019
Pinky, Babs and JJ search for a new place to hang out while their regular spot is fumigated for termites.
19	19	"Sock"	Megan Nicole Dong	Fred Belford and Aminder Dhaliwal	Aminder Dhaliwal	January 1, 2019
After losing one of his socks, Pinky decides to start wearing all of his clothes at once so that he will never lose any piece of clothing again.
20	20	"Count"	Tom Parkinson	Jen Bardekoff, Chris Garbutt, and Josh Engel	Josh Engel	January 1, 2019
Inspired by an app that counts steps, Pinky, Babs and JJ decide to count other things in their lives as well, leading to a fierce competition between the three friends.
21	21	"Voice"	Tom Parkinson	Sheela Shrinivas and Nick Arciaga	Nick Arciaga	January 1, 2019
Pinky tries to find the perfect voice with which to deliver an important oral report.
22	22	"Phone"	Neil Graf	Sheela Shrinivas and Nick Arciaga	Nick Arciaga	January 1, 2019
After autocorrect causes him to send some rude messages to Babs, Pinky decides to become his own phone.
23	23	"Friend"	Megan Nicole Dong	Sheela Shrinivas and Aminder Dhaliwal	Aminder Dhaliwal	January 1, 2019
Pinky begins feeling jealous when Babs decides to reconnect with her old best friend, Jules, it is Babs's only imaginary friend.
24	24	"Gym"	Tom Parkinson	Jen Bardekoff and Josh Engel	Josh Engel	January 1, 2019
Pinky falsely believes that his Mom is conditioning him to take over her gym/bakery business.
25	25	"List"	Megan Nicole Dong	Sheela Shrinivas and Aminder Dhaliwal	Aminder Dhaliwal	January 1, 2019
Pinky and JJ learn that Babs is moving and try to complete a list of things they've always wanted to do with her before she goes.
26	26	"Double"	Neil Graf	Jen Bardekoff, Rikke Asbjoern, and Nick Arciaga	Nick Arciaga	January 1, 2019
Pinky tries to have an absence removed from his report card by attempting to live two days at the same time.
27	27	"Sight"	Neil Graf	Fred Belford and Aminder Dhaliwal	Aminder Dhaliwal	January 1, 2019
A visit to the eye doctor leaves Babs temporarily blind, so Pinky agrees to act as her personal seeing eye hot dog.
28	28	"Grounded"	Neil Graf	Fred Belford and Dodge Greenley	Dodge Greenley	January 1, 2019
After accidentally breaking one of his Mom's trophies, Pinky grounds himself and tries to make it impossible to have fun.

=== Part 2 (2019) ===
No. overall	No. in season	Title	Directed by	Written by	Storyboarded by	Original release date
29	1	"Money"	Neil Graf	Sheela Shrinivas and Dodge Greenley	Dodge Greenley	April 22, 2019
Pinky, Babs and JJ find a hundred dollar bill on the ground and try to make it last them the entire day.
30	2	"Babs"	Tom Parkinson and Megan Nicole Dong	Jen Bardekoff and Maha Tibikh	Maha Tibikh	April 22, 2019
Pinky's attempts to get to know Babs better go too far when he watches her secret video diary.
31	3	"Sarcasm"	Megan Nicole Dong	Sheela Shrinivas and Dodge Greenley	Dodge Greenley	April 22, 2019
When sincere Pinky can’t act sarcastic for a video, Aminder teaches him how to be sarcastic, but things takes a turn for the worse when sarcasm takes over Pinky’s body and is unable to switch it off.
32	4	"Song"	Neil Graf	Sheela Shrinivas, Matt Layzell and Mike Bertino	Mike Bertino	April 22, 2019
Pinky, Babs and JJ try to track down the song that was playing on the radio while they shared a special moment of friendship.
33	5	"Brain"	Tom Parkinson	Sheela Shrinivas and Nick Arciaga	Nick Arciaga	April 22, 2019
When he forgets the anniversary of the first video he ever made with Babs and JJ, Pinky tries to find a way to erase unwanted memories from his brain to make room for new ones.
34	6	"Trophy"	Neil Graf	Sheela Shrinivas and Nick Arciaga	Nick Arciaga	April 22, 2019
After seeing Babs upset when she fails a test, Pinky decides to hand out gold stars and medals to his fellow students to raise morale.
35	7	"Search"	Megan Dong	Sheela Shrinivas, Aminder Dhaliwal and Maka Tabikh	Aminder Dhaliwal and Maha Tabikh	April 22, 2019
Pinky searches his name on the internet and finds a page full of lies about him, so he sets out to actually accomplish everything the website says to turn them into truths.
36	8	"Haircut"	Neil Graf	Sheela Shrinivas, Rikke Asbjørn and Kristen Woo	Kristen Woo	April 22, 2019
JJ is feeling self-conscious about his new haircut, so Pinky and Babs plan to get even worse haircuts to distract from his.
37	9	"Crutch"	Neil Graf	Fred Belford and Josh Engel	Josh Engel	April 22, 2019
Pinky uses a crutch to fake being injured in order to inspire his classmates.
38	10	"Smile"	Megan Dong	Jen Bardekoff and Dodge Greenley	Dodge Greenley	April 22, 2019
Pinky gets a job bagging groceries at the local supermarket where he makes it his mission to get Nurse Sally to smile.
39	11	"Cranky"	Tom Parkinson	Byron Dockins and Josh Engel	Josh Engel	April 22, 2019
Pinky wakes up on the wrong side of the bed and tries to get through the day by forcing himself to smile.
40	12	"Weeds"	Tom Parkinson	Fred Belford and Josh Engel	Josh Engel	April 22, 2019
Pinky's Dad asks him to help him in his garden but the two fundamentally disagree on how to handle the weeds when Pinky learns that plants are living things.
41	13	"Advanced"	Annisa Adjani and Kim Roberson	Chris Garbutt, Fred Belford, Josh Engel and Kristen Woo	Josh Engel and Kristen Woo	April 22, 2019
JJ enlists Pinky and Babs' help in making sure he doesn't embarrass himself when he gets accepted into the school's advanced class.
42	14	"Bestie"	Tom Parkinson	Jen Bardekoff and Ethan Hegge	Ethan Hegge	April 22, 2019
After learning that his dad doesn't have a best friend, Pinky organizes a house party to match him up with four potential candidates.
43	15	"King"	Annisa Adjani	Sheela Shrinivas and Nick Arciaga	Nick Arciaga	April 22, 2019
Inspired by his new favorite show, Pinky organizes a series of challenges to decide who will be crowned king of the Fall dance.
44	16	"Pinky"	Tom Parkinson and Megan Nicole Dong	Scott Kreamer, Chris Garbutt, Rikke Asbjoern, Josh Engel and Aminder Dhaliwal	Josh Engel and Aminder Dhaliwal	June 10, 2019
45	17	"Pinky"	Tom Parkinson and Megan Nicole Dong	Scott Kreamer, Chris Garbutt, Rikke Asbjoern, Josh Engel and Aminder Dhaliwal	Josh Engel and Aminder Dhaliwal	June 10, 2019
Wanting to inspire his town to dream big again, Pinky promises to make it snow in order to become the school mascot. Note: This is the first and only double-length half-hour episode.

=== Part 3 (2019) ===
No. overall	No. in season	Title	Directed by	Written by	Storyboarded by	Original release date
46	1	"Change"	Tom Parkinson	Sheela Shrinivas and Maha Tabikh	Maha Tabikh	July 17, 2019
Pinky’s unhappy when his favorite stop sign gets a high-tech replacement, so he sets out to save all of the things that he loves in Sackenhack.
47	2	"Outdoors"	Tom Parkinson	Byron Dockins and Maha Tabikh	Maha Tabikh	July 17, 2019
Pinky's parents try to help him and Babs earn their outdoors badges, which ends up being fierce competition and rivalry.
48	3	"Spotlight"	Megan Nicole Dong	Fred Belford and Dodge Greenley	Dodge Greenley	July 17, 2019
After Pinky gets tired of all the cameras following him, he lets Babs and JJ have their own shows, which embarrasses them.
49	4	"Dog"	Tom Parkinson	Kris Benton and Maha Tabikh	Maha Tabikh	July 17, 2019
When Babs's dog starts acting strange, she and Pinky try to take him to the vet.
50	5	"Birthday"	Neil Graf	Chris Garbutt and Jessie Wong	Jessie Wong	July 17, 2019
When Bob has to guard the mall all night during his birthday, Pinky, Babs, and JJ bring the party to him, until his alter-ego breaks out.
51	6	"Individual"	Tom Parkinson	Fred Belford and Ethan Hegge	Ethan Hegge	July 17, 2019
When Freddy confesses that he's bad at being bad, Pinky tries to help him find out who he really is.
52	7	"Dinner"	Neil Graf	Rikke Asbjoern, Sheela Shrinivas and Dodge Greenley	Dodge Greenley	July 17, 2019
Fed up with his parents being busy, Pinky sets up a romantic dinner for his Mom and Dad.
53	8	"Clique"	Megan Nicole Dong	Jen Bardekoff and Aminder Dhaliwal	Aminder Dhaliwal	July 17, 2019
After Byron calls Pinky, Babs and JJ a “goofy little Clique“, Pinky tries to show Byron that they’re not a Clique, which gets out of hand.
54	9	"Fundraiser"	Tom Parkinson	Fred Belford and Nick Arciaga	Nick Arciaga	July 17, 2019
Yet again, it's the eve of the fun run and Babs does not have a sponsor, so Pinky tries to help her get as many as she can.
55	10	"Man"	Tom Parkinson	Fred Belford and Ethan Hegge	Ethan Hegge	July 17, 2019
After finding a hair on his face, Pinky concludes that he should be the new man of the house: a decision that leaves his dad at loose ends.
56	11	"Wrestling"	Annisa Adjani	R. Chett Hoffman and Josh Engel	Josh Engel	July 17, 2019
When their principal tries to turn their gym class into a boot camp, Pinky suggests that they try to learn tag team wrestling.
57	12	"Eraser"	Tom Parkinson	Fred Belford and Ethan Hegge	Ethan Hegge	July 17, 2019
Worried that his childhood eraser is getting too small to wipe out his mistakes, Pinky commits to living his life error-free.
58	13	"Dreams"	Megan Nicole Dong	R. Chett Hoffman and Dodge Greenley	Dodge Greenley	July 17, 2019
When Pinky, Babs & JJ discover upon Eric & Valerie’s old band, The Gang tries to get the band reunited, but things aren’t going well when Pinky decides to change the band up a bit.
59	14	"Spark"	Megan Nicole Dong and Neil Graf	Byron Dockins, Annisa Adjani, Dodge Greenley and Natasha Helton	Annisa Adjani, Dodge Greenley and Natasha Helton	July 17, 2019
Convinced that his friendship with Babs and JJ is in trouble, Pinky turns to a relationship app to help them get their spark back.
60	15	"Wiener"	Neil Graf	Chris Garbutt and Jessie Wong	Jessie Wong	July 17, 2019
Pinky tries to repress his wienerness when he's told that only human boys and girls can compete in the Ultimate Mascot Championship. Note: This is the series finale.
