= Karen Houle =

Canadian poet and academic

Karen Houle is a Canadian poet and academic. She is most noted for her 2019 poetry collection The Grand River Watershed: A Folk Ecology, which was a shortlisted finalist for the Governor General's Award for English-language poetry at the 2019 Governor General's Awards.

A retired philosophy professor at the University of Guelph, she previously published the poetry collections Ballast (2000) and During (2005), and the philosophy texts Hegel and Deleuze: Together Again for the First Time (2013) and Toward a New Image of Thought: Responsibility, Complexity and Abortion (2013).
