= Pickle (comics) =

Comics series by Dylan Horrocks

Pickle is a comics series by Dylan Horrocks.

== Contents ==
Pickle is a comic series in which the stories explore everyday life, relationships and careers through its characters in a small New Zealand town.

== Publication history ==
Dylan Horrocks produced Pickle, published by Black Eye Comics, in which the "Hicksville" story originally appeared. Hicksville was published in book form in 1998.

== Reception ==
Larry Snelly reviewed Pickle in White Wolf Inphobia #53 (March, 1995) and stated that "The series is not an easy read, but it's light-hearted, insightful and definitely worth the effort."

Dylan Horrocks was nominated at the 1997 Ignatz Awards for Outstanding Artist for his work on Pickle, and the "Hicksville" story in Pickle was nominated for Outstanding Story at the same awards.
