= Céline Huyghebaert =

French-born Canadian writer and artist

Céline Huyghebaert is a French-born Canadian writer and artist, who won the Governor General's Award for French-language fiction for her novel Le drap blanc at the 2019 Governor General's Awards.

She is known for her narrative work that blurs the boundaries between fact and fiction. In her approach, she moves fluidly between image and text through prints, books, and exhibitions. She is particularly interested in poor materials and collaboratives gestures.

Originally from the French department of Yvelines, she has resided in Montreal, Quebec since 2002. She completed a doctorate in arts at the Université du Québec à Montréal, where she was awarded the Bronfman Fellowship in Contemporary Art in April 2019.

Remnants, an English translation of Le drap blanc by Aleshia Jensen, is slated for publication in 2022.
