= Anne-Marie Desmeules =

Canadian poet

Anne-Marie Desmeules is a Canadian poet from Quebec. She is most noted for her 2019 poetry collection Le tendon et l'os, which won the Governor General's Award for French-language poetry at the 2019 Governor General's Awards.

Born in Montreal and based in Lévis, Desmeules published her debut collection Cette personne très laide qui s'endort dans mes bras in 2017. Her poem "Bouleaux" was a finalist in Ici Radio-Canada's literary awards in 2018.
