= Nicola Winstanley =

New Zealand-Canadian writer

Nicola Winstanley is a New Zealand-Canadian writer based in Hamilton, Ontario, best known as an author of picture books for children.

Born and raised in New Zealand, she was educated at the University of Auckland and the University of British Columbia.

Her book Cinnamon Baby, illustrated by Janice Nadeau, was shortlisted for the Marilyn Baillie Picture Book Award in 2012, and How to Give Your Cat a Bath in Five Easy Steps, illustrated by John Martz, was a Governor General's Literary Award nominee for English-language Young People's Literature - Illustrated Books at the 2019 Governor General's Awards.

In 2024 she published Smoke, her first adult short story collection. The book received a nomination for the Danuta Gleed Literary Award in 2025.

== Works ==
- Cinnamon Baby - 2011
- The Pirate's Bed - 2015
- A Bedtime Yarn - 2017
- How to Give Your Cat a Bath in Five Easy Steps - 2019
- Mel and Mo's Marvelous Balancing Act - 2019
- Smoke - 2024
