= Atlas (comic book series) =

Comic book series by Dylan Horrocks

Publication information
- Publisher: Drawn & Quarterly
- Schedule: Standard
- Format: Ongoing series
- Genre: Fiction
- Publication date: July 2001 – 2006
- No. of issues: 3
- Main character(s): Leonard Batts; Emil Kopen

Creative team
- Created by: Dylan Horrocks
- Written by: Dylan Horrocks
- Artist(s): Dylan Horrocks

Atlas is a three-issue comic book series by cartoonist Dylan Horrocks. Published by Drawn & Quarterly, the series ran from 2001 to 2006. The series features characters first introduced in Horrocks' previous series, Pickle.

There was a four-year hiatus between issues #1 and #2, caused by Horrocks' work as the writer of DC Comics' Batgirl comic.
