= Jason Martin =

Jason Martin may refer to:

- Jason Martin (American football) (born 1972), American football player
- Jason Martin (cricketer) (born 1995), Guernsey cricketer
- Jason Martin (musician), member of the indie rock band Starflyer 59
- Jason Martin (rugby league) (born 1970), Australian former rugby league footballer
- Jason Martin (artist) (born 1970), painter
- Jason Martin (baseball) (born 1995), American baseball player
- JasonMartin (born 1987), American rapper formerly known as Problem
