= The Hunter (comics) =

British comic book limited series

- The cover of issue #1. Art by David Golding

Publication information
- Publisher: Dare Comics
- Format: Limited series
- Genre: Superhero
- Publication date: December 2007
- No. of issues: 4

Creative team
- Written by: Adam Hamdy
- Artist: David Golding
- Colourist(s): Jhosephine Tanuwidjaya, Ian Sokoliwski

The Hunter is a British comic book limited series created by Adam Hamdy, with art by David Golding. It is published by Dare Comics. Hamdy's and Golding's work on The Hunter has been compared to Stan Lee's, and Jack Kirby's, best work for Marvel.

== Series one ==
The Hunter is about Gabriel Mot, a CIA agent with extraordinary powers. He's tasked with finding those responsible for coordinated attacks on America, and reveals a hidden world of dark beings with tremendous destructive powers. Series One of The Hunter was published in four issues between December 2007 and January 2009.

=== Issue One ===
Issue #1 of The Hunter tells the story of Gabriel Mot, a CIA agent with extraordinary powers, and the start of his investigation into four coordinated attacks on America. Issue #1 opens with a man called Ammut taking a taxi to Los Angeles International Airport. The action shifts to a water treatment plant outside Boston, where the staff are fazed by a surprise inspection carried out by a man called Erys. In Houston, a man called Masubi makes a delivery to the Benzoil Refinery, and in New York, a woman known as Reshef joins a group that is being taken on a tour of the New York Stock Exchange.

A CIA agent is suspicious of Ammut when he spots him at LAX, but intense security checks find nothing. As the agent confronts Ammut, all four locations are attacked. Ammut detonates a nuclear bomb at LAX, Erys taints Boston's water supply, Masubi destroys the refinery, and Reshef launches a chemical attack at the NYSE.

The President and his advisors respond to the emergency by calling on Gabriel Mot, an undercover operative who possesses superhuman powers. His call sign is the Hunter. Gabriel is in Afghanistan when the attacks take place, and is on the trail of a powerful arms smuggler known as Arian. Working with CIA agent Dexter Johnson, Gabriel tracks Arian to an arms deal, but Arian escapes in a violent confrontation.

Back home, another member of Gabriel's team, Loni Mickelson, visits a hideously deformed informant known as the Freak. She asks him to help find out who was behind the attacks. Gabriel returns to the United States, as the President declares a national curfew.

=== Issue Two ===
Issue #2 reveals how Gabriel obtained the extraordinary powers that enabled him to become the Hunter. The book begins with the gruesome murder of a CIA agent who can tie Ammut to the attack on LAX. Gabriel meets with the President and his staff, and is instructed to devote all efforts to identifying the individuals behind the attack. Gabriel is ordered to Russia to a secret facility in the Urals, where the CIA believes a clandestine genetic engineering programme has been restarted.

In Chicago, an FBI team is killed in an explosion as they attempt to arrest the supposed mastermind of the terrorist attacks. The mastermind is killed and all evidence is destroyed. Freak walks into a trap and is attacked by Masubi, who we learn has the ability to secrete a form of napalm from his pores. Freak's flesh is burned away, but he is able to escape, when the fight is interrupted by a National Guard patrol.

Freak manages to get to Gabriel's headquarters, where Gabriel, Loni and Dexter give him what medical treatment they can. Gabriel, Loni and Dexter leave for Russia. After they are gone, Freak, who has been followed, is attacked by Masubi and Reshef. Freak escapes the ensuing fight, but Gabriel's headquarters are destroyed.

Gabriel flies to Russia and infiltrates the secret facility in the Urals, but he is captured and sedated. When he comes round, he finds himself restrained and unable to transform into the Hunter. Doctor Piotr Rykov, the man who holds him captive, tells him the truth about his past. Gabriel was created as part of Project Svetovid, a secret Soviet program initiated during the Cold War that was designed to develop extremely destructive beings who could be embedded in Western societies and activated in the event of nuclear war. These beings were called Sleepers. When the Berlin Wall fell in 1989, the Colonel in charge of Project Svetovid became Russia's first capitalist and sold the Sleepers to the highest bidders: criminal gangs and terrorists all over the world.

Loni and Dexter attack the facility and free Gabriel, who transforms into the Hunter and tracks Rykov down. He is about to kill Rykov when the old man tells him the truth, the facility has been reactivated to find ways to destroy the Sleepers. Rykov realized the terrible destructive force he has unleashed upon the world and is determined to hunt down and destroy every Sleeper in existence.

=== Issue Three ===
Issue #3 sees Gabriel uncover the conspiracy only to be marked as a traitor by the CIA. Gabriel, Loni and Dexter return to the United States, but are arrested and charged with treason on the basis that Gabriel did not destroy the facility. While the CIA prepare for Gabriel's destruction, Freak learns of Gabriel's location from an informant.

Loni and Dexter are tortured in an attempt to get them to confess their treachery, and Gabriel is placed in a Baryogenesis chamber, where his atoms will be ripped apart in order to kill him. Freak steals a truck and travels to Langley, where Gabriel and the others are held. He fights his way into the building and frees Loni and Dexter. Together they rescue Gabriel and escape.

Working from Freak's underground lair, the team piece together the evidence and learn that someone has infiltrated the government and is trying to get rid of Gabriel. That same individual is behind the terror attacks that have rocked America. Gabriel learns that Project Svetovid has been restarted, but not in Russia, the destructive program is now run from Area 51.

=== Issue Four ===
Issue #4 concludes the first series with a special 80 page issue. The Hunter unmasks the mastermind behind the attacks and thwarts a potentially catastrophic assassination attempt on the President. Loni, Dexter, Gabriel and Freak travel to Area 51. They split into two teams. Loni and Freak infiltrate the main facility, while Dexter and Gabriel break into the nuclear reactor that generates power for the whole base. They must shut down the reactor in order to disable the containment field generators that prevent Gabriel from transforming into Hunter.

Loni and Dexter find irrefutable evidence that Project Svetovid has been restarted. They are captured by a group of Sleepers led by Arian. In the reactor control room, Gabriel and Dexter try to shut the reactor down, but are attacked. The control rod systems are hit in the attack and the reactor goes into meltdown. With seconds to spare, Gabriel and Dexter escape the ensuing explosion. With the reactor destroyed, Gabriel is able to transform into Hunter. He infiltrates the main facility, where he is confronted by Roman, an incredibly powerful Sleeper.

Roman captures Hunter and flies him into Outer space, where it is believed he can be destroyed. Roman hurls Hunter into the Sun, and for a moment it seems like all is lost. Then the Sun turns black with anti-matter and the people of Earth witness an unnatural eclipse. Hunter explodes from the Sun, captures Roman, and uses the defeated Sleeper to get back to Earth. Unable to kill Roman, Hunter encases him in anti-matter, and then deals with Grigory Tomsky, the mastermind behind the attacks. He was Doctor Rykov's assistant, and is determined to start World War Three in order to wipe humanity from the face of the Earth, and repopulate the planet with Sleepers, who are, in his view, more perfect creatures and better suited to inherit the planet.

Freak, Loni and Hunter kill the remaining Sleepers and take Tomsky into custody. Hunter races to Washington with Dexter. He learns that Tomsky's plan to trigger World War started with the attacks and culminates with the assassination of the President during the State-of-the-Union address.

Hunter reaches Washington and confronts Ammut, just as he is powering up to unleash a nuclear blast. Using new-found abilities, Hunter is able to contain Ammut in a tiny ball of anti-matter. With all the Sleepers involved in the plot destroyed, Tomsky in secure confinement, and the nation safe, Gabriel, Loni and Dexter rebuild their headquarters and get back to their regular mission: tracking down and destroying every Sleeper who poses a threat to the safety of the planet.

== Publication and reception ==
Hamdy set out to create a superhero for the 21st century, and founded Dare Comics to publish The Hunter. Issue one was published in December 2007 and received largely positive reviews, with Ain't It Cool New's reviewer saying that he was "riveted to each page".

With the publication of the rest of the series, critical acclaim intensified with one reviewer saying that he could only "see good things coming from what may soon be referred to as a franchise." Ain't It Cool News called the series "pretty darn distinct and special" and applauded the Freak as "one of the cooler new characters to grace comics in recent years".

Commercially, the series was regarded as a success with over 130,000 readers reached worldwide through a combination of print and online distribution.

== Series two ==
It has been reported that Dare Comics will publish Series Two of The Hunter in 2010.

== Film ==
In late 2009 it was announced that Hunter had been optioned for a film by Scarlet Fire Entertainment, with Hamdy providing the script. Hamdy is reportedly working on an entirely original story for the film.

== Motion Comic ==
In March 2010 it was announced that production had commenced on a series of Hunter motion comics.
