= Lilli Carré =

American filmmaker and cartoonist

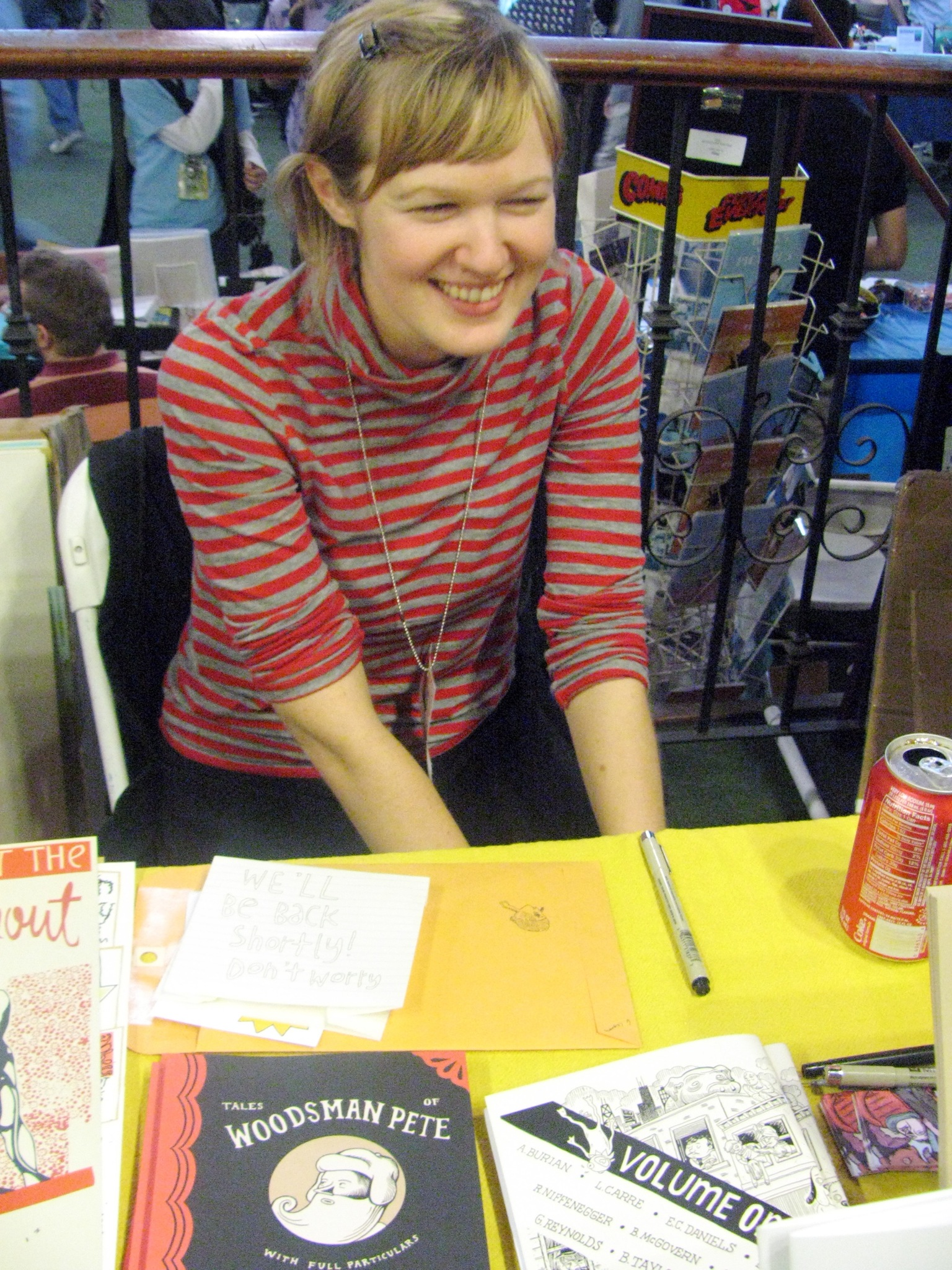
- Carré at the Alternative Press Expo in 2018
- Born: 1983 (age 42–43); Los Angeles, California, U.S.
- Education: Northwestern University (MFA 2016); School of the Art Institute of Chicago (BFA 2006)
- Known for: Experimental animation, animation, cartoons, commercial illustration, printmaking, artists' books, painting, sculpture, textiles
- Website: lillicarre.com

Lilli Carré (born 1983) is an American interdisciplinary artist currently based in Los Angeles, working in experimental animation, ceramics, print, and textile. She is co-director of the Eyeworks Festival of Experimental Animation and is represented by contemporary art gallery Western Exhibitions. She currently teaches in the Experimental Animation department at the California Institute of the Arts. In 2024, she received a Guggenheim Fellowship for work in film and video.

== Early life and education ==
Carré was born and grew up in Los Angeles. Her mother is a graphic designer and her father, who died when Carré was a teenager, was a designer and forensic animator. She has said that a "major activity throughout my childhood was when my parents would roll out a big sheet of butcher paper on the apartment floor, and my sister and I would amuse ourselves quietly for hours by drawing images and stories all over it". Carré transferred to an arts high school in her senior year and then left Los Angeles, initially to study sound at the School of the Art Institute of Chicago (SAIC) and become a sound artist, but she became interested in creative writing, film, and printmaking. While studying she also worked in the Joan Flasch Artists' Book Collection. As part of her creative writing classes she read various short story writers and cites Jorge Luis Borges and Julio Cortázar as having inspired her very much. She received her BFA from SAIC in 2006 and settled in Chicago where she currently lives and works. She received her MFA from Northwestern University in 2016. Carré worked part-time at the Facets Multi-Media film library for several years, an experience she has said influenced her filmmaking.

== Experimental animation ==
Carré has created numerous experimental animation films and looping videos using hand drawn animation, paper cut-out, and CG animation. Her films have shown in festivals throughout the US and abroad, including the Sundance Film Festival, International Film Festival Rotterdam, Annecy, 25FPS, the European Media Arts Festival, New Chitose Animation Festival, and the Ann Arbor Film Festival.

She has been co-director of the Eyeworks Festival of Experimental Animation since 2010. The Festival is a curated screening series focusing on experimental animation. Festival programs showcase outstanding experimental animation of all sorts, and include classic films and contemporary works. Notable festival guests include David Oreilly, Lori Damiano, Nancy Andrews, Caleb Wood, Martin Arnold, Takeshi Murata, Jacolby Satterwhite, Naoyuki Tsuji, Janie Geiser, Barry Doupé, Al Jarnow, Laura Harrison, Yoriko Mizushiri, and James J.A. Mercer.

She cites as a favorite project a recent collaboration with Laura Harrison on Overheard in the Underworld, a video installation for 150 Media Stream in Chicago, based on a book-length poem The Descent of Alette by Alice Notely.

She currently teaches in the Experimental Animation program at the California Institute of the Arts.

== Drawing and sculpture ==
Carré has been represented by Chicago contemporary art gallery Western Exhibitions since 2012. Solo exhibitions of her drawing, animation, and sculpture have shown at the Museum of Contemporary Art Chicago, Western Exhibitions, and the Columbus Museum of Art. She was an artist in residence at the Bemis Center for Contemporary Art in 2020.

She participated in the Ukrainian Institute of Modern Art's Ten x Ten 2013, which "investigates the relationship between color and sound...exploring the underlying concepts of synesthesia". In 2013, she produced an "entirely new body of work in animation, sculpture, and drawing" for her first solo show at the Museum of Contemporary Art, Chicago.

== Comics ==
Carré has created comics and illustrations for The New Yorker, The New York Times, and Best American Comics, and published several books of comics with Fantagraphics.

Her books of comics include Tippy and the Night Parade (2014), Heads or Tails (2012), Nine Ways to Disappear (2009), The Lagoon (2008), and Tales of Woodsman Pete (2006). An excerpt from The Lagoon was chosen to be included in The Best American Comics 2010 and "The Carnival" was nominated for Outstanding Story at the 2009 Ignatz Awards. Carré's film How She Slept at Night screened at the 2007 Sundance Film Festival.

She provided the illustrations in Andrew Sean Greer's 2017 novel Less, which received the Pulitzer Prize for Fiction.

== Films ==
- Stone Fruit (2022)
- Glazing (2021)
- Gloves Off (2020)
- Private Properties (2019)
- Huskies (2018)
- Tap Water (2017)
- Jill (2016)
- Hand Catching Banana (2016)
- Crux Film (2013), a collaboration with artist and filmmaker Alexander Stewart.
- The Negotiation (2013)
- Like a Lantern (2012)
- In Suspense (2012)
- Pout Melody
- Disillusionment of Ten O'Clock (2011), based on Wallace Stevens's poem of the same name
- Bleedin' Heart (2011)
- L'Ortolan (2010) a collaboration with filmmaker Chris Hefner, about the culinary ritual of eating the ortolan bunting bird
- Everything Must Go, described by Carré as "an animated loop made from 500 paintings, based frame-by-frame on found footage of a windsock man blowing in the wind on top of a shuttered business"
- Head Garden (2009)
- How She Slept At Night (2006)
- What Hits The Moon (2005)

== Books ==
- The Deaths of Henry King (2017, Uncivilized; ISBN 978-1-941250-20-4)
- Tippy and the Night Parade (2014, Toon Books; ISBN 978-1935179573)
- Heads or Tails (2012, Fantagraphics Books; ISBN 978-1606995976)
- The Fir-Tree (2009, It Books-HarperCollins; ISBN 978-0061782367)
- Nine Ways to Disappear (2009, Little Otsu; ISBN 978-1934378175)
- The Lagoon (2008, Fantagraphics Books; ISBN 978-1560979548)
- Tales Of Woodsman Pete (2006, Top Shelf Productions; ISBN 978-1891830846)

== Anthologies ==
- Best American Comics 2006, 2008, and 2010, Houghton Mifflin
- Best American Nonrequired Reading 2010, Houghton Mifflin
