= Aminder Dhaliwal =

Canadian cartoonist and animator

- Born: December 5, 1988 (age 37) Wembley, England, United Kingdom
- Notable works: Woman World

Aminder Dhaliwal (born December 5, 1988) is a Canadian animator, storyboard artist, cartoonist, writer, and director. She is best known for her 2018 graphic novel Woman World.

Dhaliwal was born to Punjabi parents in Wembley, England where she grew up until the age of 11. Her family then moved to Brampton, Ontario where she spent the rest of her adolescence. She attended Sheridan College for animation and, in her final year, won a placement at Nickelodeon as a production intern in 2011. She moved to Los Angeles and began working as a storyboard revisionist, and since 2012 has accumulated credits as a writer, director, storyboard artist and storyboard director on a number of television series, including The Fairly OddParents, Sanjay and Craig, Steven Universe, and Pinky Malinky. She is currently employed as a storyboard director at Cartoon Network, director at Disney Television Animation, and story artist at Sony Pictures Animation.

== Comics ==
Inspired by the Women's March in 2017, Dhaliwal began serializing Woman World on Instagram. The science fiction comic tells the story of the development of an all-woman civilization after men become extinct as a result of a birth defect. After amassing over 100,000 followers on Instagram, the strip was reworked for print and collected as a graphic novel published by Drawn & Quarterly in September 2018.

The Instagram version of Woman World was nominated for a 2018 Ignatz Award for Outstanding Online Comic. In 2019, the graphic novel was itself nominated for a Doug Wright Spotlight Award and made the longlist of nominees for the Stephen Leacock Memorial Medal for Humour.

On March 27, 2019, it was announced that Dhaliwal was writing the pilot episode of an animated version of Woman World for Disney's Freeform cable network. Actress Felicia Day is to produce the proposed series.

== Bibliography ==
Title	Date	Publisher	Notes
Woman World	2019	Drawn & Quarterly	
Dead End Jobs for Ghosts	2020	ShortBox	
Cyclopedia Exotica	2021	Drawn & Quarterly	
A Witch's Guide to Burning	2024	Drawn & Quarterly	

== Animation ==
Year	Title	Notes
2011	Hide and Seek	Director, animated short
2012–2013	Robot and Monster	Storyboard Revisionist
2013–2014	The Fairly OddParents	Storyboard Revisionist, 13 episodes
2014–2016	Sanjay and Craig	Writer, 18 episodes; Storyboard Director, 12 episodes
2019	Pinky Malinky	Writer; Storyboard Artist, 8 episodes
2020	The Owl House	Director, 6 episodes; Storyboard Artist, 5 episodes
2020	Close Enough	Storyboard Director, 6 segments
2021	Centaurworld	Writer, 2 episodes; Story, 10 episodes
