= Disappearance Diary =

Manga by Hideo Azuma

- Cover of English language adaptation

失踪日記 (Shissō Nikki)
- Genre: Slice of life story
- Manga
- Written by: Hideo Azuma
- Published by: East Press
- English publisher: NA: Fanfare, Ponent Mon
- Published: March 2005
- Volumes: 1

Disappearance Diary (Japanese: 失踪日記, Hepburn: Shissō Nikki) is a manga by Hideo Azuma and published by East Press in Japan in March 2005. The manga is a somewhat-fictionalized autobiography of part of the author's life and of his alcohol dependency problems. It has received multiple awards inside and outside Japan. In addition to being published in Japan, this book has been licensed and published in English, French, Spanish, German, Italian, Russian and Polish.

== Reception ==
- 2005: Grand Prize, Manga Division, 9th Japan Media Arts Awards
- 2006: Grand Prize, Tezuka Osamu Cultural Prize
- 2008: Selection, Angoulême International Comics Festival
- 2009: Nominee, Ignatz Award, Outstanding Graphic Novel, Small Press Expo

About.com's Deb Aoki lists Disappearance Diary as the best new one-shot manga of 2008 along with Solanin.
