= Hicksville (comics) =

Graphic novel by Dylan Horrocks

- Cover of the Drawn & Quarterly collected edition
- Creator: Dylan Horrocks
- Date: 1998
- Publisher: Black Eye Comics

Original publication
- Published in: Pickle
- Issues: 1-10
- Date of publication: 1993 – Dec. 1996
- Language: English
- ISBN: 9781770460027 (softcover)

Hicksville is a graphic novel by Dylan Horrocks originally published by Black Eye Comics in 1998. The novel explores the machinations of the comic book industry, and contains a slightly fictionalized account of the history of mainstream American comics, with particular attention paid to the era of Image Comics.

== Publication history ==
Much of Hicksville was serialized in Horrocks' ten-issue solo series Pickle, published by Black Eye from 1993 to 1996. The collected edition, which featured much redrawn art, was released by Black Eye in 1998, shortly before the company went out of business. Hicksville was republished by Canadian publisher Drawn & Quarterly in 2001 and again in 2010. In 2010 the graphic novel was republished by New Zealand publisher Victoria University Press.

Hicksville has been translated into Spanish (Astiberri Ediciones), Italian (Black Velvet), German (Reprodukt), French (Casterman and L'Association) and Croatian (Fibra).

== Plot ==
Canadian writer Leonard Batts arrives in the tiny New Zealand town of Hicksville to research the early life of Dick Burger, whose work has taken the comic book industry by storm. He finds that Hicksville is a town in which everyone from the postman to the farmer is an expert on comics, yet everyone seems to hate Burger. Many of the book's main characters are themselves comic creators, and many of their strips are reproduced in full as part of the story, most notably Sam Zabel's extensive account of moving to Los Angeles in order to work with Burger, which he documents in his self-published comic Pickle (the title of the Dylan Horrocks series in which the storyline was actually published).

== Themes ==
Horrocks said of Hicksville:

It's a story about comics - their history and poetry - and also about what we New Zealanders call 'tūrangawaewae' - having a place to stand in the world - a kind of spiritual home. Hicksville is my way of creating such a home for comics.

Derik Badman writes of the village where much of the book's action takes place:

Hicksville can serve as a metaphor for the artist freed of commercial constraint and popular prejudice (in the case of comics at least). Here is a place where Picasso would actually make comics in honor of George Herriman (creator of Krazy Kat, which the historical Picasso really did read and love), where the local cafe is called "The Rarebit Fiend" (after a Winsor McCay comic strip), and where once a year everyone dresses up as a comics character for the Hogan's Alley party (Hogan’s Alley being the place where The Yellow Kid lived). Here is the place where the great comic artists of the past created the works they wanted to create, rather than working their whole lives on corporate owned properties.

== Characters ==
Hicksville is a meta-comic and the book's characters include normal (albeit fictional) humans from our world, and comic book characters (all actually created by Horrocks) who appear in various publications — such as Laffs magazine, Sam Zabel's Pickle, and the various titles published by Eternal Comics — interwoven into the pages of the graphic novel.

=== Recurring characters ===
Leonard Batts — a Canadian comics critic for the fictional Comics World Magazine. He previously published a book on Jack Kirby called The King: Jack Kirby: a Biography and has come to Hicksville in search of information about Dick Burger's origins. He appears at the Hogan's Alley bonfire as Captain Tomorrow, which causes great consternation among the other attendees.

Dick Burger — a cartoonist, originally an orphan from Hicksville who now lives in Los Angeles, who has built a mainstream comics empire, mainly based on his revival of Captain Tomorrow and other characters. He controls Eternal Comics.

Emil Kópen — Kornukopija's greatest living cartoonist, creator of Valja Domena; Kópen "represents the power of cartooning as pure art".

Sam Zabel — an indy cartoonist and creator of the autobiographical comic book series Pickle (as well as a former contributor to New Zealand's Laffs weekly humor magazine). Sam is originally from Hicksville, where he grew up with Dick Burger. He appears at the Hogan's Alley bonfire as Charlie Brown, after previously appearing as Robin.

Sally — Sam's love interest and eventually his wife.

Mopani — the daughter of Irene; they both live in Auckland.

Cincinnati Walker — an American actress who develops an interest in Sam Zabel. She plays Lady Night in the Captain Tomorrow film series.

Mort Molson — creator of the Golden Age Captain Tomorrow.

Lou Goldman — creator of the Golden Age Lady Night.

=== Hicksville residents ===
Grace Pekapeka — former lover of first Dick Burger and later Danton. A botanist, she spent many years working at the Crieste Botanic Institute (Crieste is the capital of Cornucopia). She makes a connection with Kornukopija (Cornucopia) artist Emil Kópen. She appears at the Hogan's Alley bonfire as Milena, the heroine of Kopen's Valja Domena. Her last name is a reference to a native bat of New Zealand.

Helen — appears at the Hogan's Alley bonfire as Batgirl (a costume which originally belonged to Grace). She appears to have a crush on Sam Zabel.

Danton — owner and manager of The Rarebit Fiend tea room. He appears at the Hogan's Alley bonfire as Mister Bunion of Winsor McCay's A Pilgrim's Progress by Mister Bunion.

Huck — frequent customer of The Rarebit Fiend. It's implied that he lives with Harry the postman.

Harry — Hicksville's postman and an avid comics fan, particularly of the work of Ed Pinsent, Chris Reynolds, and the "English School". He appears at the Hogan's Alley bonfire as a character with a square head and a large capital "P" on his shirt.

Famer Dobbs — a farmer with a dog named Fang. He appears at the Hogan's Alley bonfire as Popeye. He is a proponent of the work of Sergio Aragonés.

Mrs. Hicks — proprietor of the Hicksville Book Shop and Lending Library, which stores an amazing collection of rare and unusual comics from all over the world. She appears at the Hogan's Alley bonfire.

Hyram — appears at the Hogan's Alley bonfire as Captain Haddock. He is a proponent of the works of Edgar P. Jacobs.

Kupe — resident and caretaker of Hicksville's lighthouse, as well a secret library of "culturally and spiritually" valuable comics, including Mort Molson's Captain Tomorrow: Rebirth, which was plagiarized by Dick Burger. Kupe ends up with Grace. Kupe is inspired by New Zealand's mythical Kupe.

Dougal

=== Comic book characters ===
Captain Tomorrow — a Golden Age superhero created by Mort Molson, who has been revived as a much darker figure by Dick Burger in the 1990s.

Lady Night — a 1950s-era superhero created by Lou Goldman, who has been revived as a much darker figure by Dick Burger in the 1990s.

The Captain — an explorer based on Captain James Cook.

Hōne Heke — a Maori man based on the highly influential rangatira (chief) of the Ngāpuhi iwi (tribe) and a war leader in Northern New Zealand; in the book he accompanies the Captain as his "sidekick".

Alfred — a cartographer based on Charles Heaphy. He appears alongside the Captain and Hōne Heke.

Moxie & Toxie — a male & female cartoon duo created by Sam Zabel.

== Subsequent work ==
Leonard Batts and a minor character, cartoonist Emil Kópen, both appear in Horrocks' later series Atlas. Sam Zabel is the protagonist of Horrocks' 2014 graphic novel Sam Zabel and the Magic Pen (Fantagraphics).

== Awards ==
Hicksville was nominated for Ignatz Awards for Best Graphic Novel & Best Art, and a Harvey Award for Best Reprint Collection. The French edition was nominated for two Prix d’Alph’Arts for Best Graphic Novel & the Prix de la critique ("Critic's Prize"). The foreign editions were nominated for an Attilio Micheluzzi Award for Best Graphic Novel, and the Best Foreign Comic at the Barcelona Comics Festival. It was named one of the top five books of 1998 by The Comics Journal.

In 2002, based on Hicksville and his follow-up series Atlas, Horrocks won an Eisner Award for Talent Deserving of Wider Recognition.
