= Silly Daddy =

Comics title by Joe Chiappetta

Joe Chiappetta
- Born: January 14, 1968 (age 58); Chicago, Illinois
- Occupations: Writer, Cartoonist
- Writing career
- Pen name: Silly Daddy
- Period: 1987—present
- Genres: family, autobiography, humor, sci-fi, fantasy, Political satire, Christian
- Notable works: Silly Daddy, Star Chosen, Back Pain Avenger, Mighty Messianic Prophecy
- Website: sillydaddy.net

Silly Daddy is a comic book, graphic novel and webcomics blog by Joe Chiappetta. Born out of the American Independent Comics Movement, the comic started shortly after the birth of his first child in 1991, artist Joe Chiappetta began his career as "Silly Daddy", a mostly autobiographical comic series centered on his experience (and lack thereof) as a father. Since Joe is a resident of Chicago, most of the Silly Daddy adventures take place in the Chicago area or local dreamland. Major themes in this eclectic series include parenting, family relationships, goofing off, the search for joy and meaning in life, and redemption. The print comic version and the webcomic have elements of humor, surrealism, and slice-of-life observations.

== Timeline ==
Chiappetta began publishing Silly Daddy in 1991. A graphic novel collection of his work came out in 1994, featuring a decade of art. Chiappetta began posting Silly Daddy as a webcomic in 2004, and moved it to Blogger in early 2007.

Chiappetta was most active as a cartoonist in the 1990s, and largely moved on to writing prose in the 2000s.

== Reception ==
Reviewing the 1994 Silly Daddy graphic novel, Publishers Weekly described the collection as reminiscent of Harvey Pekar's American Splendor at first glance, though noted the appeal of seeing Chiapetta's "considerable evolution as an artist" in the book. The art and lettering of early stories in the book are described as "terribly crude", while the book's cover is described as "genuinely handsome".

=== Awards ===
- Xeric Award Winner: 1998
- Ignatz Award Nominee: Outstanding Artist, 1998
- Ignatz Award Nominee: Outstanding Story, 1997
- Harvey Award Nominee: Best New Series, 1996
- Illinois Arts Council Award, 2012
