= Joe Daly (comics) =

English-born South African comics artist and writer (born 1979)

- Born: 23 March 1979 (age 47) London, United Kingdom
- Areas: Comics artist, Writer
- Collaborators: Fantagraphics Books, L'Association

Joe Daly (born 23 March 1979) is an English-born South African comics artist and writer. His first American work titled Scrublands was described as an "introverted dreamlike stream-of-consciousness" and "over-the-top postmodern vaudevillian". His other works include the Red Monkey Double Happiness Book, the Dungeon Quest book series, and Highbone Theatre. His work has also appeared in Bitterkomix, Mome, and Kramers Ergot comic anthologies. Joe Daly's books are predominantly published by Fantagraphics Books, in Seattle, U.S.A., and L'Association, in Paris, France.

== Early life ==
Born in London, United Kingdom, Daly studied animation for two years at Cape Town's City Varsity.
