= Hideo Azuma =

Japanese manga artist (1950–2019)

- 吾妻 ひでお
- Born: 吾妻 日出夫 (Azuma Hideo); 6 February 1950; Urahoro, Hokkaidō, Japan
- Died: 13 October 2019 (aged 69); Tokyo, Japan
- Occupation: Manga artist
- Years active: 1969–2019
- Works: Nanako SOS; Little Pollon
- Movement: Lolicon
- Children: 2
- Awards: see below

Hideo Azuma (吾妻 ひでお, Azuma Hideo; February 6, 1950 – October 13, 2019) was a Japanese manga artist. Azuma made his professional debut in 1969 in the Akita Shoten manga magazine Manga Ō. He was most well known for his science fiction lolicon-themed works appearing in magazines such as Weekly Shōnen Champion, as well as children's comedy series such as Nanako SOS and Little Pollon (which both became anime television series in the early 1980s). He has been called the "father of lolicon".

In 2005 he published an autobiographical manga titled Disappearance Diary that has won several awards including the Tezuka Osamu Cultural Prize. His name is also sometimes romanized Hideo Aduma.

== Career ==
=== Early years ===
While attending Hokkaidō Urahoro High School, Azuma participated in the Hokkaidō branch office of COM, along with other artists such as Monkey Punch and Fumiko Okada. In 1968, after graduating from high school, he moved to Tokyo and found employment with Toppan Printing. He left this job after three months to work as an assistant to manga artist Rentarō Itai, where he did uncredited work for Weekly Shōnen Sunday on series such as Mini Mini Manga.

Azuma made his professional debut in 1969 in Manga Ō with his work Ringside Crazy. The following year he quit working as an assistant and doing his own work. He gradually expanded his work to include both shōjo and seinen manga. His first works tended to be light gag manga, though he began to include science fiction elements influenced by his being a fan of the New Hollywood movement in American film. It was during this period that he experimented a lot with one panel manga (as opposed to four panel).

Beginning in 1972, Azuma began rising in popularity due to the off-color humor in his Weekly Shōnen Champion series Futari to 5-nin. He also married his assistant the same year, with whom he had a daughter in 1980 and a son in 1983. His wife was credited as "Assistant A" in his works, and his daughter and son were respectively credited as "Assistant B" and "Assistant C".

=== Boom period ===
Azuma began serializing in 1975 his story Yakekuso Tenshi in the semimonthly manga magazine Play Comic. He also began publishing science fiction themed works in many different niche magazines such as Kisō Tengai and Peke. Azuma, together with Jun Ishikawa, is considered part of the manga creators in the 1970s. Due to works such as science fiction novel parody Fujōri Nikki, published in Bessatsu Kisō Tengai in 1978, Azuma began to gain a large following among science fiction fans. Fujōri Nikki was awarded the 1979 Seiun Award for Best Comic of the Year. In 1979, Azuma was a major contributor to the first issue of the dōjinshi series Cybele, which is credited with launching the lolicon genre.

From there, he began publishing in magazines such as Shōjo Alice, becoming a fixture in the pornographic lolicon manga business and becoming very involved in otaku culture.

=== Downfall and late career ===
In the late 1980s and into the 1990s, due to stress from his hectic and demanding schedule during 20 years (to that point) as a manga artist, Azuma began drinking heavily, disappeared twice for several months to over a year, attempted suicide at least once, and was finally forcibly committed to an alcohol rehabilitation program.

In 2005, he published a manga journal of this experience titled Disappearance Diary. The manga won several awards, including the prestigious Tezuka Osamu Cultural Prize, and it was translated into English, French, Spanish, German, Italian, Russian and Polish.

Azuma died in hospital on October 13, 2019, due to esophageal cancer at the age of 69.

== Style ==
He is frequently mentioned as a part of the New Wave movement of manga in the 1980s. Kentarō Mizumoto cites Azuma's Fujōri Nikki (1979) as an example of the approach of science fiction manga of the movement, as they would function as a parody of science fiction and were thus the essence of new wave science fiction. Azuma rejected being labeled as part of the New Wave, when manga critic Natsume Fusanosuke invited him and other artists to appear in a newspaper article Fusanosuke wanted to publish about the movement in 1981.

== Works ==
=== Manga ===
- Futari to 5-nin (1974–1976, 12 volumes, Shōnen Champion Comics, Akita Shoten)
- Shikkomōrō Hakase (1976, 1 volume, Sun Comics, Asahi Sonorama)
- Oshaberi Love (1976–1977, 2 volumes, Princess Comics, Akita Shoten)
- Olympus no Pollon (1977, 2 volumes, Princess Comics, Akita Shoten)
  - anime adaptation Ochamegami Monogatari Koro Koro Pollon in 1982-1983
  - manga reprinted in 2005-2007 by Hayakawa Shoten
- Eight Beat (1977, 2 volumes, Sun Comics, Asahi Sonorama)
- Kimagure Gokū (1977, 2 volumes, Sun Comics, Asahi Sonorama)
- Midare Moko (1977, 1 volume, Power Comics, Futabasha)
- Chibi Mama-chan (1977–1978, 2 volumes, Shōnen Champion Comics, Akita Shoten)
- Chokkin (1977–1978, 4 volumes, Shōnen Champion Comics, Akita Shoten)
- Yakekuso Tenshi (1977–1980, 5 volumes, Akita Manga Bunko, Akita Shoten)
- Nemuta-kun (1978, 2 volumes, KC Comics, Kodansha)
- Sexy Ai (1978, 1 volume, Sun Comics, Asahi Sonorama)
- Fujōri Nikki (1979, Kisō Tengai Comics, Kisō Tengai)
- Kyūketsuki-chan (1979, Kisō Tengai Comics, Kisō Tengai)
- Parallel Kyōshitsu (1979, Kisō Tengai Comics, Kisō Tengaisha)
- Animal Company (1980, My Comics, Tokyo Sanseisha)
- Azuma Hideo Sakuhinshū 1: Methyl Metaphysic (1980, Kisō Tengai Comics, Kisō Tengai)
- Azuma Hideo Sakuhinshū 2: Gansaku Hideo Hakkenden (1980, Akita Shoten)
- Azuma Hideo Sakuhinshū 3: Kakutō Family (1980, Kisō Tengai Comics, Kisō Tengai)
- Azuma Hideo Sakuhinshū 4: The Iroppuru (1980, Kisō Tengai Comics, Kisō Tengai)
- Mimi (1980, Sun Comics, Asahi Sonorama)
- Ningen Shikkaku (1980, My Comics, Tokyo Sanseisha)
- Tobe Tobe Donkey (1980, Princess Comics, Akita Shoten)
- Yadorigi-kun (1980, Shōnen Champion Comics, Akita Shoten)
- Brat Bunny (1980–1982, 2 volumes, Animage Comics, Tokuma Shoten)
- Hizashi (1981, hardcover, Kisō Tengaisha)
- Mahō Tsukai Chappy (1981, Animage Comics, Tokuma Shoten) - manga adaptation of the 1972 magical girl anime series by Toei Animation; not an original Azuma character
- Mia-chan Kannō Shashinshū (1981, Jihi Shuppan)
- Paper Night (1981, Shōnen Shōjo SF Manga Kyōsaku Daizenshū Zōkangō, Tokyo Sanseisha)
- Suki! Suki!! Majo Sensei (1981, Animage Comics, Tokuma Shoten)
- Yōsei no Mori (1981, Torauma Shobō)
- Scrap Gakuen (1981–1983, 3 volumes, Akita Shoten Manga Bunko, Akita Shoten)
- Butsu Butsu Bōkenki (1982, My Comics, Tokyo Sanseisha)
- Chocolate Derringer (1982, Play Comic Series, Akita Shoten)
- Hyper Doll (1982, Play Comic Series, Akita Shoten)
- Jinginaki Kuroi Taiyō Lolicon-hen (Lolicon Daizenshū) (1982-05-31, Gun'yūsha Shuppan)
  - published in Minity-Yamū (1984-12-30, Play Comic Series, Akita Shoten)
- Magical Land no Ōjo-tachi (1982, Sanrio)
- Umi kara Kita Kikai (1982, Kisō Tengaisha)
- Yakekuso Mokushiroku (1982, Sun Comics, Asahi Sonorama)
- Mia-chan Love World (1983, Best Hit Series, Akita Shoten)
- Ochamegami Monogatari: Koro Koro Pollon (1983, anime version, 100-ten Land Comics, Futabasha)
- Nanako SOS (1983–1986, 5 volumes, Just Comic Zōkan, Kobunsha)
  - anime adaptation in 1983, also known as Nana Supergirl (Italy), Supernana (France)
- Majunia Eve (1984, Play Comic Series, Akita Shoten)
- Hideo Collection 1: Hideo Dōwashū (1984, Action Comics, Futabasha)
- Hideo Collection 2: Jūgatsu no Sora (1984, Action Comics, Futabasha)
- Minity-Yamū (1984, Play Comic Series, Akita Shoten)
- Hideo Collection 3: Sumire Kōnen (1985, Action Comics, Futabasha)
- Hideo Collection 4: Tenkai no Utage (1985, Action Comics, Futabasha)
- Hideo Collection 5: Daibōkenko (1985, Action Comics, Futabasha)
- Hideo Collection 6: Taiyō wa Mata Noboru (1985, Action Comics, Futabasha)
- Hideo Collection 7: Tokimeki Alice (1985, Action Comics, Futabasha)
- Hideo Land 1: Amazing Marie (1985, Play Comic Series, Akita Shoten)
- Maku no Machi Death Match!! (1985, ISBN 4-592-13065-0, Jets Comics, Hakusensha)
- Pulp-chan no Daibōken (1985, Pulp Comics, Pulp)
- Oh! Azuma (1995, ISBN 4-8211-9440-6, Bunka Comics, Bunkasha)
- Ginga Hōrō (1995–1997, 2 volumes, Mag Comics, Magazine House)
- Azumania vol.1-3 (1996, Hayakawa Shoten)
- Crush Okusan (1998–2002, 2 volumes, Bunkasha Comics, Bunkasha)
- Azuma Hideo no Fujiyūjō (1999, Mandarake)
- Futsukayoi Dandy (1999, ISBN 4-8387-1138-7, Mag Comics, Magazine House)
- Alien Eri (2000, ISBN 4-8211-9819-3, Bunkasha Comics, Bunkasha)
- Sanchoku Azuma Magazine 1 (2001-current, Jihi Shuppan)
- Disappearance Diary (Shissō Nikki) (2005, East Press, ISBN 4-87257-533-4)
- Nanako SOS (2005, Hayakawa Shoten, reprint)
- Benriya Mimi-chan (2006, Bunkasha, ISBN 4-8211-8351-X)
- Tokimeki Alice Teihon (2006, Chikuma Shuppansha, ISBN 4-8050-0455-X)
- Utsu Utsu Gideo Nikki (2006, Kadokawa Shoten, ISBN 4-04-853977-9)
- Yoru no Tobari no Naka de Azuma Hideo Sakuhinjō (2006, Chikuma Shuppansha, ISBN 4-8050-0456-8)
- Neo Azumania vol.1-3 (2006–2007, Hayakawa Shoten)
- Tōbō Nikki (an interview-style autobiography) (2007, Nihon Bungeisha, ISBN 4-537-25465-3)
- The Ward of Alcoholics (Shissō Nikki 2) (2013, East Press, ISBN 978-4-78-161072-6)

=== Books ===
- Nanako My Love: Azuma Hideo Illust Book (1983, Just Comic Zōkan, Kobunsha)
- Yo no Sakana: Ohta Comics Geijutsu Manga Sōsho (1992, ISBN 4-87233-074-9, Ohta Books)

== Awards ==
- 1979: Seiun Award for Fujōri Nikki
- 2005: Grand Prize, Manga Division, 9th Japan Media Arts Awards for Shissō Nikki
- 2006: Grand Prize, Tezuka Osamu Cultural Prize for Shissō Nikki
- 2008: Selection, Angoulême International Comics Festival for Shissō Nikki
