= Nanako SOS =

Japanese manga series

- First tankōbon volume cover, featuring Nanako, Yotsuya, and Iidabashi.

ななこSOS (Nanako Esuouesu)
- Genre: Gag comic, magical girl, romance, science fiction, slice of life
- Manga
- Written by: Hideo Azuma
- Published by: Kobunsha (1980–1985); Self-Published (2001–2016)
- Magazine: Popcorn (1980–1981); Just Comic (1981–1985); Sanchoku Azuma Magazine (2001–2016)
- Original run: Initial run April 1980 – July 1985; Continued run July 2001 – August 2016
- Volumes: 5
- Anime television series
- Directed by: Akira Shigino
- Written by: Yu Yamamoto
- Studio: Kokusai Eiga-sha
- Original network: Fuji TV
- Original run: April 2, 1983 – December 24, 1983
- Episodes: 39

Nanako SOS (ななこSOS, Nanako Esu-ou-esu) is a Japanese manga series created by Hideo Azuma. It initially ran in Popcorn and Just Comic (both published by Kobunsha) from April 1980 to July 1985 and later continued as a Doujinshi in Azuma's Sanchoku Azuma Magazine, running irregularly from July 2001 to August 2016. The series was adapted into 39-episode anime television series produced by Kokusai Eiga-sha which aired on Fuji TV between April 2 and December 24, 1983.

== Story ==
Nanako is a young girl who unexpectedly acquires superpowers and at the same time loses her past memory as the unintended result of a scientific experiment gone awry. The mad scientist high school student who was running the experiment, Tomoshige Yotsuya, says he will help her regain her memories if she will join his detective agency. Nanako innocently believes him, but Yotsuya's real intent is to use her powers to benefit his agency and himself.

The story unfolds as Nanako encounters a variety of dangerous missions and mysterious events, but her natural sunny disposition helps her through all the incidents as she solves each mystery one after the other.

== Characters ==
A scene from the anime featuring the three main characters from left to right: Iidabayashi, Yotsuya, and Nanako.

Nanako (ななこ)
Voiced by: Reiko Kitō
A shy young girl who has lost her memory, she can fly, has super strength, and can become a giant. She stays with Yotsuya and Shibuya, as Yotsuya has promised to help her get her memory back. They give her a costume and call her "SuperGirl", but she is unaware that they only want her to help them fight crime. She experiences some strange things as a hero, for example turning into a boy named Nanano. At one point her powers disappear. She has a crush on Yotsuya.

Eiichirō Yotsuya (四谷 永一郎, Yotsuya Eiichirō) (Tomoshige Yotsuya (四谷 智茂, Yotsuya Tomoshige) in the anime)

Voiced by: Yūji Mitsuya
A tall, pink-haired, leather-clad biker boy who is there when Nanako gets her powers. He is trying out his latest invention, a machine that can supposedly give a person super intelligence, when he finds Nanako. He promises to help her get her memory back, but he really only wants her to benefit his detective agency, although he seems to develop feelings for her as time passes.
Hakase Iidabashi (飯田橋 博士, Iidabashi Hakase)
Voiced by: Tōru Furuya
Yotsuya's bespectacled classmate, best friend, and fellow detective. He has a crush on Nanako, but that doesn't stop him yelling at her when she does something wrong. He wants to be a manga artist. He is always the guinea pig for Yotsuya's experiments.
Dr. Ishikawa (ドクター石川, Dokutā Ishikawa)
Voiced by: Banjō Ginga
A strange man who is always chasing after Nanako. He seems to be from the military, and fights with a water pistol.
Convenience Angel 7 (コンビニエンジ・セブン, Konbini Enji Sebun)
Voiced by: Naoki Tatsuta
A robot designed by Yotsuya, he sends 7 and 11 to follow Nanako and help her out when needed.
Convenience Angel 11 (コンビニエンジ・イレブン, Konbini Enji Irebun)
Voiced by: Kyoko Miyagi
A robot designed by Yotsuya, he sends 7 and 11 to follow Nanako and help her out when needed.

== Overseas distribution ==
Enoki Films holds the rights to the series and has released it internationally under the name Nana the Supergirl.
