= Jonathan Hill (cartoonist) =

American illustrator and cartoonist

- Areas: Cartoonist, Artist
- Notable works: Americus; Odessa; Tales of a Seventh-Grade Lizard Boy
- Collaborators: M.K. Reed
- Awards: Carla Cohen Free Speech Award; 2012 Americus; Believer Book Award; 2021 Odessa – Graphic Narrative

Jonathan Hill is an American cartoonist, illustrator, and professor. He is known for the comics Americus, Odessa, and Tales of a Seventh-Grade Lizard Boy. He resides in Portland, Oregon.

== Career ==
In 2007, Hill began as an illustrator of stories and comics for Asian Reporter.

In 2011, Hill's first published collaboration with writer and cartoonist M.K. Reed, a graphic novel called Americus, came out from First Second.

In 2014, Hill began teaching illustration and sequential narratives at the Pacific Northwest College of Art.

Active in the Portland community and the education community, Hill collaborated with the Portland Book Festival, in 2019, to depict the fest in visual form.

In 2019, Hill released another comic collaboration with Reed, Science Comics: Wild Weather, from publisher First Second.

In 2020, Hill released his first graphic novel that he also wrote, Odessa, published by Oni Press.

In summer of 2020, Hill was a guest lecturer at Tin House's Summer Workshop.

In 2022, Hill released graphic novel Tales of a Seventh-Grade Lizard Boy, the first in the Lizard Boy series, published by Walker Books. The second book in the series, was due for release in April 2025.

In 2025, Hill released a new comic book with writer M.K. Reed called Budding Crisis, published by comiXology Originals.

== Recognition ==
- Americus won the 2012 Carla Cohen Free Speech Award, becoming the first graphic novel to receive the reward.
- Odessa won the 2021 Believer Book Award for Graphic Literature.
- Hill serves on the Board of Directors for the Literary Arts.
