= John Martz =

Author and illustrator

John Martz is a Toronto-based author, illustrator, cartoonist, and designer.

Most of Martz's career has focused on art, designer, and illustration. From 2005 to 2013, he ran an art blog called Drawn!, then in 2015, he became the Joanne Fitzgerald illustrator-in-residence through IBBY Canada and the Toronto Public Library. Two years later, he became the art director at Tundra Books, a position he held until 2022. Martz has also contributed to The Globe and Mail, The Nib, and Mad.

Martz's first illustrated book, Dianne Young's Dear Flyary, was published with Kids Can Press in 2010. He has since worked with various authors, including Nicola Winstanley, and illustrated an adaptation of Abbott and Costello's Who's on First?. He authored his first book, The Big Team Society League Book of Answers, with Koyama Press in 2012. His other books including Destination X (2013), Machine Gum (2013), which began as an ongoing comic series, Burt's Way Home (2016), Evie and the Truth about Witches (2018), and A Cat Named Tim and Other Stories (2021).

== Awards and honours ==
Two of Martz's books are Junior Library Guild selections: Nicola Winstanley's How to Give Your Cat a Bath (2019) and Evie and the Truth About Witches (2021). In 2020, Quill & Quire named Martz's cover design of Riel Nason's The Little Ghost Who Was a Quilt among the year's best book covers.

Awards for Martz's work
Year	Work	Award	Result	Ref.
2008	Excelsior 1968	Pigskin Peters Award	Finalist	
2010	It's Snowing Outside, We Should Go for a Walk	Doug Wright Award for Best Emerging Talent	Finalist	
2011	Heaven All Day	Gene Day Award for Self Publishing	Winner	
2013	Gold Star	Ignatz Award for Outstanding Story	Winner	
2014	Dear Flyary	SaskEnergy Children's Literature Award	Winner	
2014	Destination X	Ignatz Award for Outstanding Story	Finalist	
2015	A Cat Named Tim and Other Stories	Governor General's Award for English-language children's illustration	Finalist	
2015	A Cat Named Tim and Other Stories	Eisner Award for Best Publication for Early Readers	Nominee	
2016	Be Good	Ignatz Award for Outstanding Story	Finalist	
2017	Burt's Way Home	Cartoonist Studio Prize for Best Print Comic of the Year	Shortlist	
2017	Burt's Way Home	Doug Wright Award for Best Book	Finalist	
2017	Burt's Way Home	Eisner Award for Best Publication for Early Readers	Nominee	
2019	Evie and the Truth About Witches	Doug Wright Award for Best Book	Finalist	
2019	How to Give Your Cat a Bath in Five Easy Steps	Governor General's Award for English-language Young People's Literature - Illustrated Books	Finalist	
2023	Burt rentre à la maison	Prix Jeunesse de la Critique	Finalist	
2025	A Face Is a Poem	Alcuin Society Award for Children's Picture Books	Third	
2025	The Gulf	Alcuin Society Award for Comics / Graphic Novels	First	
2026	The Little Ghost Quilt's Winter Surprise	Alcuin Society Award for Children's Picture Books	First	
2026	Words with Wings and Magic Things	Alcuin Society Award for Children's Picture Books	Honourable mention	

== Books ==
- Young, Dianne (2010). Dear Flyary. Illustrated by John Martz. Kids Can Press.
- Heidbreder, Robert (2010). Black and Bittern Was Night. Illustrated by John Martz. Kids Can Press.
- Martz, John (2012). The Big Team Society League Book of Answers. Koyama Press.
- Abbott and Costello (2013). Who's On First?. Illustrated by John Martz. Quirk Books.
- Martz, John (2013). Destination X. Nobrow.
- Martz, John (2013). Machine Gum. La Pastèque.
- Martz, John (2016). Burt's Way Home. Koyama Press.
  - Martz, John (2022). Burt's Way Home. Tundra Books.
  - Martz, John (2022). Burt rentre à la maison. Illustrated by Luba Markovskaia. La Pastèque.
- Kaner, Etta (2018). Do Frogs Drink Hot Chocolate?. Illustrated by John Martz. Owlkids.
- Martz, John (2018). Evie and the Truth About Witches. Koyama Press.
  - Martz, John (2020). Evie and the Truth About Witches. Tundra Books.
- Winstanley, Nicola (2019). How to Give Your Cat a Bath. Illustrated by John Martz. Tundra Books.
- Martz, John (2021). A Cat Named Tim and Other Stories. Tundra Books.
- Sumner, Eija (2022). Crocodile Hungry. Illustrated by John Martz. Tundra Books.
- Hrab, Naseem (2026). Every Space Between. Illustrated by John Martz. Groundwood Books.
