= Hotwire (comics) =

Series of comics

Hotwire is a comics series created by Steve Pugh, with later writing credits by Warren Ellis.

== Publication history ==
Hotwire was a project originally slated to be published by Tundra UK back in the early 1990s.

Hotwire first appeared as a pair of illustrations by Pugh in Atomeka Press' A1 Sketchbook, published in 2004; the first Hotwire story, "Filthy," written and drawn by Pugh, was published in 2005 in Atomeka's A1 Bojeffries Terror Tome anthology.

This was followed by the first four-issue limited series, Hotwire: Requiem for the Dead, published by Radical Comics in early 2009. A second limited series, Hotwire: Deep Cut, also published by Radical Comics, appeared in late 2009. Concepts were created by Ellis, with the script and art being provided by Pugh.

== Overview ==
The comic book series takes place in a science fictional future. In it, the main character, Detective Alice Hotwire, sets out to save the world from an “ectoplasmic catastrophe” that was caused by a security failure at the maximum security Necropolis. The break-in at the Necropolis causes “blue light ghosts” to become evil. Alice's work is not appreciated by her police colleagues, and she needs to overcome the villains and her lack of support to return things to the status quo.
