= Dylan Horrocks =

New Zealand cartoonist

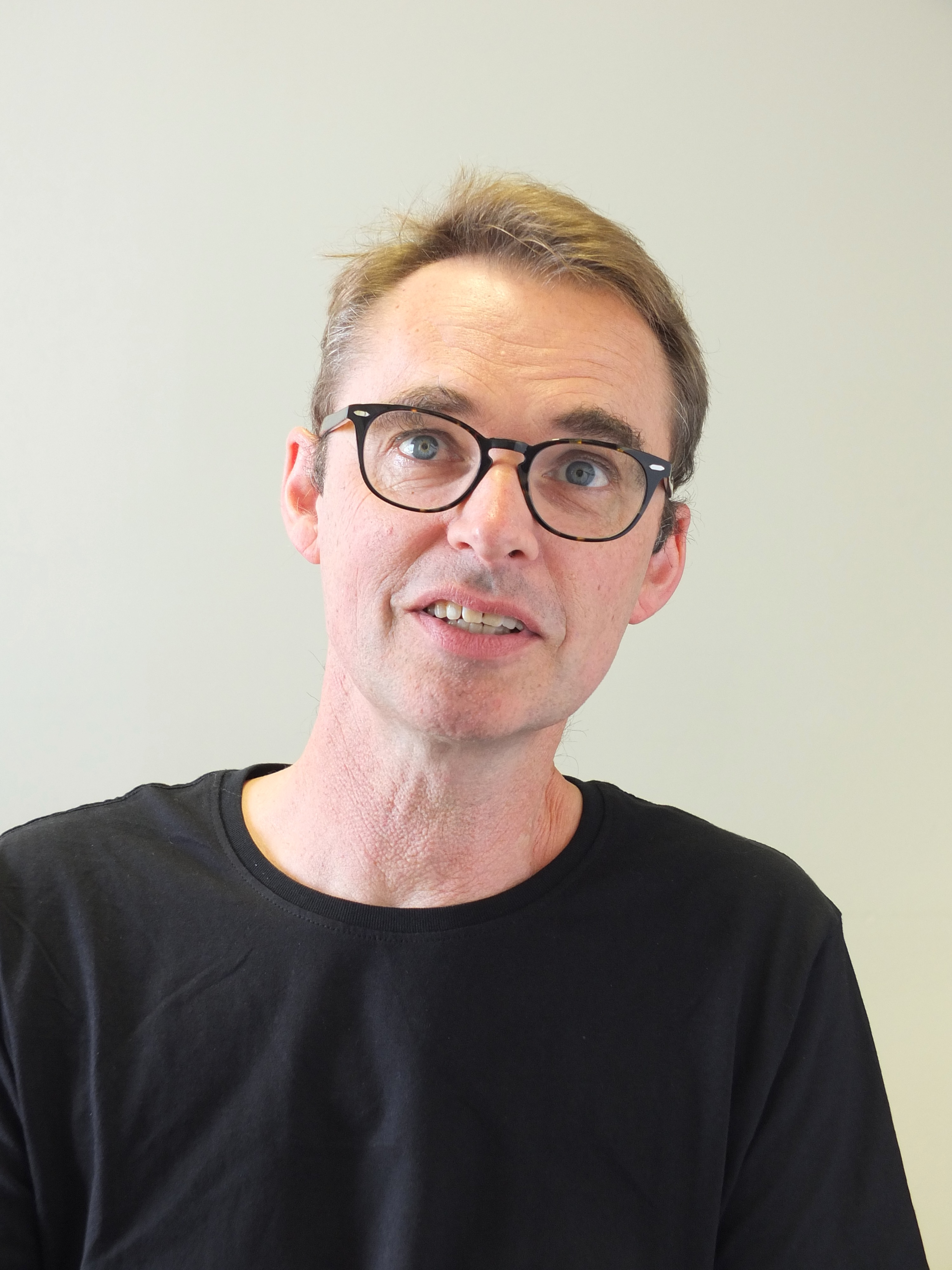
- Born: 1966 (age 59–60) Auckland, New Zealand
- Area: Cartoonist
- Notable works: Hicksville; Batgirl
- Awards: "Talent Deserving of Wider Recognition" Eisner Award (2002)

Dylan Horrocks (born 1966) is a New Zealand cartoonist best known for his graphic novel Hicksville and his scripts for the Batgirl comic book series.

His works are published by the University of Auckland student magazine Craccum, Australia's Fox Comics, the current affairs magazine New Zealand Listener from 1995 to 1997, the Canadian publishers Black Eye Comics and Drawn & Quarterly, and the American publishers Vertigo and Fantagraphics Books. He currently serialises new work online at Hicksville Comics.

== Early life ==
In an interview with Comics Bulletin, Horrocks claimed that his first words were 'Donald Duck'.

== Career ==
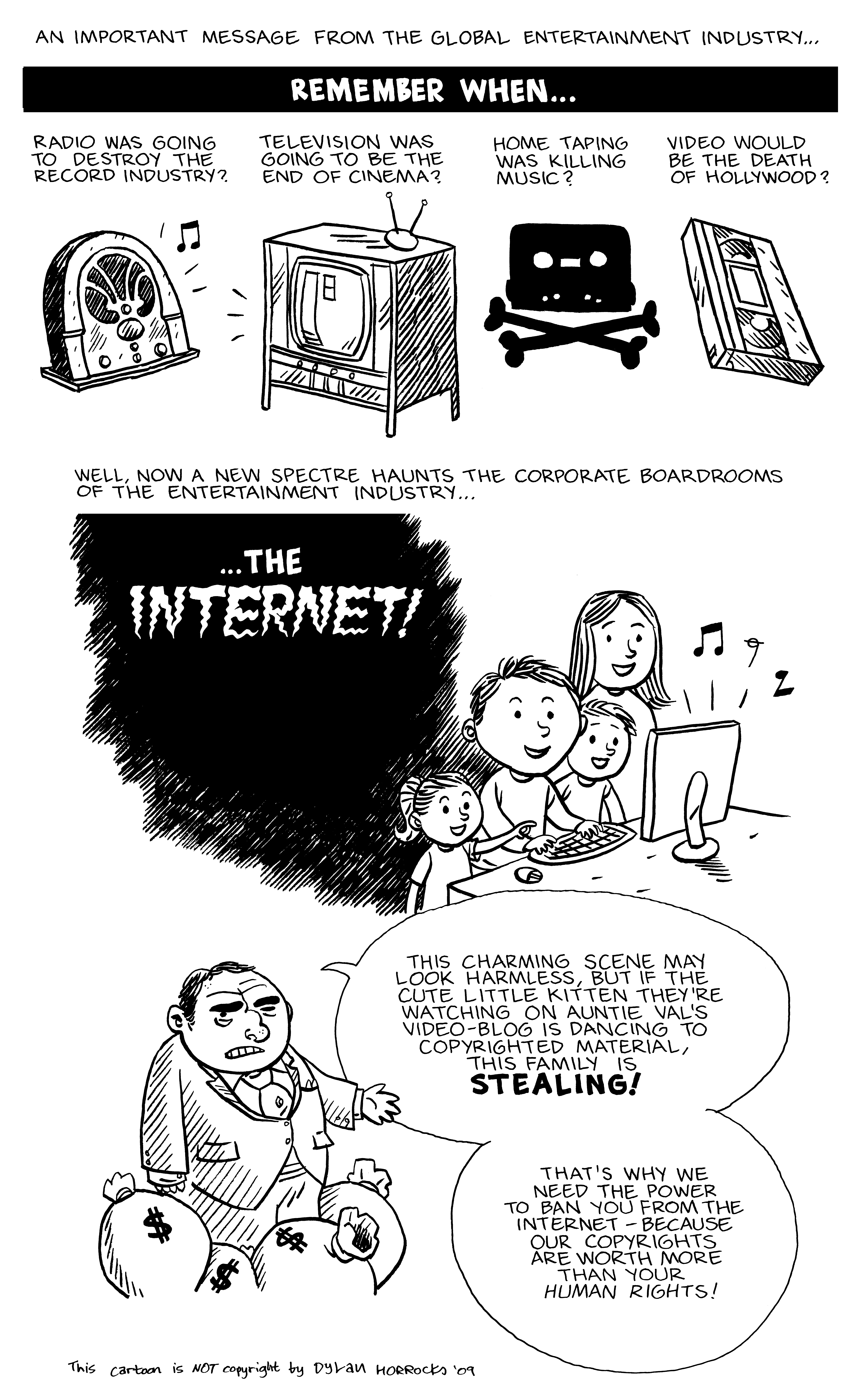
A Dylan Horrocks cartoon on the subject of internet piracy, drawn in a similar style to Pickle and 'Milo's Week'.

Horrocks has been involved in the New Zealand comic scene since the mid-1980s, when he co-founded Razor with Cornelius Stone and had his work published in the University of Auckland student magazine Craccum. Later in the decade he began to get international recognition, having work published by Australia's Fox Comics and the American Fantagraphics Books. He then moved to the United Kingdom where he self-published several minicomics and co-founded Le Roquet, a comics annual. Upon returning to New Zealand in the mid-1990s, Horrocks had a half-page strip called 'Milo's Week' in the current affairs magazine New Zealand Listener from 1995 to 1997. He also produced Pickle, published by Black Eye Comics, in which the "Hicksville" story originally appeared. Hicksville was published in book form in 1998, achieving considerable critical success. French, Spanish and Italian editions have since been published.

In the last decades Horrocks has written and drawn a wide range of projects including scripts for Vertigo's Hunter: The Age of Magic and the Batgirl series, and Atlas, published by Drawn & Quarterly. His graphic novel Sam Zabel and the Magic Pen, featuring one of the main characters from Hicksville, was published by Fantagraphics in 2014. He currently serialises new work online at Hicksville Comics.

=== Activism ===
In support of the 2009 New Zealand Internet Blackout Horrocks released a cartoon satirizing the position of corporations in the entertainment industry. This comic was displayed on piracy's flagship torrent site The Pirate Bay for a few days before the Spectrial.

=== Displays ===
Horrocks's work has been displayed at the Auckland Art Gallery and Wellington's City Gallery.

=== Awards and fellowship ===
In 2002 Horrocks won an Eisner Award for Talent Deserving of Wider Recognition, and the same year Atlas was nominated for the Harvey Award for Best Single Issue or Story in 2002. In 2006 he was appointed University of Auckland/Creative New Zealand Literary Fellow.

In 2016 Horrocks was recognised as a Laureate by the Arts Foundation of New Zealand.
