= Chicago Alternative Comics Expo =

Comic book festival in Chicago

Chicago Alternative Comics Expo (CAKE)
- Status: Active
- Genre: Alternative comics convention
- Frequency: Annual
- Venue: Center on Halsted (2013–2019); Broadway Armory (2023)
- Locations: Chicago, Illinois
- Country: United States
- Inaugurated: 16 June 2012; 14 years ago
- Founder: Edie Fake and Neil Brideau
- Most recent: June 3–4, 2023
- Next event: 2024
- Attendance: 2,200 (2014)
- Organizer: Tyrell Cannon, Sage Coffey, Chris Lopez, Tony Recktenwald, Ed Witt
- Filing status: Nonprofit
- Website: www.cakechicago.com

The Chicago Alternative Comics Expo (widely known as CAKE) is a comic book festival usually held each June in Chicago.

Inaugurated in 2012, the curated festival showcases graphic novels, comic books, minicomics, and zines created by independent artists and publishers. CAKE focuses on the art of comics, and unlike traditional comic book conventions, does not feature much in the way of cosplaying, collectibles, back-issue dealers, or mainstream superhero publishers. Instead, the show centers around an artist alley-style exhibition space that features roughly 200 vendors, as well as industry-related panel discussions. The festival gives out the CupCake Awards, geared toward minicomic self-publishers.

== History ==
The Chicago Alternative Comics Expo was co-founded by Edie Fake and Neil Brideau, both then employees at the Chicago independent bookstore Quimby's. The show was designed to honor Chicago's legacy as a home for small-press and self-publishing cartoonists.

CAKE was inaugurated as a two-day event on June 16–17, 2012, at 1104 S. Wabash (The Ludington Building), part of the campus of Columbia College Chicago. Sponsors included Quimby's Bookstore, the Art Institute of Chicago, and Columbia College Chicago, some of whose venues hosted concurrent events related to the show.

The event moved to the Center on Halsted, an LGBT community center, in 2013.

The convention achieved nonprofit organization status in 2015.

In 2020, CAKE announced it was leaving its long-time location at Center on Halsted, and relocating to the Broadway Armory, located in Chicago's Edgewater neighborhood. However, the 2020, 2021, and 2022 events were canceled due to the COVID-19 pandemic.

The in-person show returned in 2023, held at the Broadway Armory.

=== Event history ===
Dates	Primary Venue	Featured Guest(s)
June 16–17, 2012	The Ludington Building (Columbia College Chicago); 1104 S. Wabash, Chicago	Jeffrey Brown, Lilli Carré, Anders Nilsen, Closed Caption Comics, Paul Hornschemeier, Lucy Knisley, Anne Elizabeth Moore, Corinne Mucha, Laura Park, Pizza Island, John Porcellino, Nate Powell, Trubble Club
June 15–16, 2013	Center on Halsted; Chicago	Chris Ware, Kim Deitch, Phoebe Gloeckner, Jason Shiga, Aaron Renier, Michael DeForge
May 31–June 1, 2014	Center on Halsted; Chicago	Tony Millionaire, Edie Fake, Anya Davidson, Inés Estrada, Lizz Hickey, Hellen Jo
June 6–7, 2015	Center on Halsted; Chicago	Eleanor Davis, Gilbert Hernandez, Jaime Hernandez, Keiler Roberts, Zak Sally, Dash Shaw, Jillian Tamaki, Lale Westvind
June 11–12, 2016	Center on Halsted; Chicago	Chester Brown, Tyrell Cannon, Ezra Claytan Daniels, Sammy Harkham, Cathy G. Johnson, Patrick Kyle, Laura Park, Trina Robbins, Leslie Stein
June 10–11, 2017	Center on Halsted; Chicago	Gabrielle Bell, Gary Panter, Ron Regé Jr., Kevin Budnik, Emil Ferris, Jesse Jacobs, Ben Passmore, C. Spike Trotman, Jessi Zabarsky
June 2–3, 2018	Center on Halsted; Chicago	Tony Breed, Eddie Campbell, Nick Drnaso, Nicole Hollander, Audrey Niffenegger, Mimi Pond, Fiona Smyth, Carol Tyler, Georgia Webber, Jim Woodring, Gina Wynbrandt, Bianca Xunise
June 1–2, 2019	Center on Halsted; Chicago	Ezra Claytan Daniels, Nicholas Gurewitch, Corinne Halbert, Michael Kupperman, Anders Nilsen, Ben Passmore, Aaron Renier, Isabella Rotman, Whit Taylor, Rosemary Valero-O'Connell
~~June 13–14, 2020~~ (Note: Cancelled due to COVID-19 pandemic)	~~Center on Halsted~~; ~~Chicago~~	
~~June 2021~~ (Note: Cancelled due to COVID-19 pandemic)	~~Broadway Armory~~; ~~Chicago~~	
~~2022~~ (Note: Cancelled due to COVID-19 pandemic)	~~Chicago~~	
June 3–4, 2023	Broadway Armory; Chicago	MS Harkness, Derf Backderf, MariNaomi, Molly Mendoza, Joy San, Leigh Luna, Johnny Sampson, Matt Allison

== CupCake Award ==
The CupCake Award is a juried prize that is presented annually at CAKE to a local minicomic creator. It comes with $250 to use toward printing a new minicomic, half a table at that year's show, and the "support" of a local mentor.

Year	Winner	Mentor
2015	Sara Drake	Annie Koyama
2016	Goda Trakumaite	John Porcellino
2017	Kelly Fernandez	Caitlin McGuirk
2018	Adam Griffiths	Edie Fake
2019	Diana Chu	Marnie Galloway
2020	Joi Yao	Tyrell Cannon
2021	AnneMarie Rogers	Isabella Rotman
2022	Bread Tarleton	Jim Terry
2023	Natalie Mark	Zachary Clemente, Kat Fajardo
