= Floyd Farland - Citizen of the Future =

American graphic novel

- The cover for Floyd Farland - Citizen of the Future, art by Chris Ware.
- Date: 1987
- Page count: 52 pages
- Publisher: Eclipse Comics
- Writer: Chris Ware
- Artist: Chris Ware

Floyd Farland - Citizen of the Future is a creator-owned satirical graphic novel written and drawn by Chris Ware, and published by Eclipse Comics in 1987. It was a reworking of strips Ware created as art director for student newspaper The Daily Texan, and his first nationally published work. The story revolves around Floyd Farland, a citizen in an Orwellian state who is such a conformist his own government believes him to be a fearsome subversive. Ware has since dismissed the story as juvenilia.

== Creation and publication ==
Ware originally created the strip in serial form for The Daily Texan while a student at the University of Texas at Austin in 1986 (where he also debuted Quimby the Mouse). During the mid-1980s black-and-white independent comic boom his work was read by Fred Burke, an Austin native who moved to Guerneville, California to become an editor at Eclipse Comics. Burke showed the strip to Eclipse publisher Dean Mullaney, who loved the strips and arranged their publication as a graphic novel. At the time Ware was only 19 years old. Floyd Farland was published as a one-off square-bound volume, a format recently popularised by DC Comics' The Dark Knight Returns. Ware was initially bemused by a publisher that worked with Alan Moore being interested in publishing his work. Floyd Farland's abstract art style saw it spotlighted along with the similarly minimalist Larry Marder's Tales of the Beanworld and Matt Feazell's cynicalman in an Eclipse advertising campaign titled 'The Changing Face of American Comics'.

The novel also included in-universe advertisements for 'Taxation' and 'Tastee Brand Food Paste', and contained brief afterwords from Ware and his mother, who expressed her relief that he was drawing in comics rather than on walls.

== Synopsis ==
Through control of the media, a totalitarian regime has complete command of the people - aside from a valiant group of rebels known as The Underground. One person who isn't a member of the underground is Floyd Farland, who is happy to be a brainwashed Population Engineer, unflinchingly subservient to the state. However, misunderstandings and various Underground members covering their status soon see Farland treated as a subversive rebel himself. He is unprotestingly arrested, imprisoned and sentenced to execution. Both the government and the rebels view Farland's contentment with the regime as being part of his cover. Despite his best efforts, Farland is rescued from prison by the Underground, who acclaim him as the messiah of the rebellion. Unnerved, he flees, while the government initiates a mission called 'Find and Destroy Floyd Farland' - which is largely unsuccessful due to ongoing sabotage by the Underground. Farland changes his identity to Frank Masterson and gets a job delivering pizza, but his new name is the same as another rebel and his attempts to be taken back in by the government are interpreted as further evidence he is a powerful 'Thought-Warrior.' Farland manages to get himself and a cell of rebels imprisoned a second time and, despite beatings from both his fellow inmates and the guards, he remains upbeat and confident the system will clear up the confusion. He is eventually able to get hold of a Pastmaster history altering device, but instead of using it to free everyone he instead restores his happy life as a drone-like Population Engineer, bringing the story around to the beginning once again.

== Editions ==
Title	ISBN	Release date	Publisher
Floyd Farland - Citizen of the Future	ISBN 0913035211	1987	Eclipse Comics

== Reception ==
Bob Hughes of Amazing Heroes referred to it as "1984 meets Woody Allen". Gerard Jones was highly positive about the book in a review for the same publication, calling it "Weird, satirical, hard-edged, a little perverted. And very good," praising Ware's stark artwork and use of panel layouts in aiding the book's paranoid atmosphere. He also noted Ware's maturity.

=== Disownment by Ware ===
Conversely, Ware has gone on the record several times to voice his dislike of the work and even disavow it. During a 2001 interview with Keith Phipps of The A.V. Club, he stated he would send a letter of thanks and a drawing to anyone who mailed him their copy of Floyd Farland as he would "like to eradicate any trace of its ever existing, if possible." He has also called it "Blade Runner/1984 stuff from high school" and "painfully bad." As Eclipse went out of business in 1994, Floyd Farland has been out of print since — having the side-effect of making the graphic novel expensive on the secondary market.
