= Rusty Brown =

Comics series/graphic novel by Chris Ware

- Rusty Brown Part I cover
- Creator: Chris Ware
- Date: September 2019
- Main characters: Rusty Brown; Chalky White; Alice White; Jordan Lint "Woody" Brown; Joanne Cole
- Page count: 356 pages
- Publisher: Pantheon Books

Original publication
- Published in: Newcity; Chicago Reader; Acme Novelty Library
- Date of publication: 1997–2010
- ISBN: 978-0375424328

Rusty Brown is a comics series by American cartoonist Chris Ware. The work is an ongoing, multi-part narrative centered on a group of interconnected characters associated with a private school in Omaha, Nebraska, with storylines spanning from childhood into adulthood. Although named for its title character — a socially isolated boy with a fixation on collecting pop-cultural memorabilia — the series itself follows a wider cast, including Rusty's family, classmates, and teachers, across several decades. Ware has described the project as "an attempt to write a book without a protagonist." The series is a noted example of Ware's penchant for precise page layouts, muted color palettes, and typographic experimentation.

== Publication history ==
Rusty Brown began as a series of one-page installments in Chicago alternative weekly newspapers and later in Ware's solo series Acme Novelty Library. Ware first introduced the character in Newcity in 1997, and continued the series in the Chicago Reader into the mid-2000s.

Ware later developed the material into a longer, interconnected narrative. He has stated that he began work on the expanded version of Rusty Brown shortly after completing Jimmy Corrigan, the Smartest Kid on Earth (which was published in the year 2000). Ware expanded the project in issues of the Chicago Reader and subsequently Acme Novelty Library, including issues #16, #17, #19, and #20 (published between 2005 and 2010), as well as the anthology The Book of Other People, edited by Zadie Smith. These installments introduced longer, self-contained narrative sections focused on individual characters.

The first book-length collection, Rusty Brown was published by Pantheon Books on September 24, 2019. Marketed as "Part I," the volume gathers previously published material alongside over 100 pages of newly created and revised sections, presenting the opening portion of a larger, ongoing narrative. Described in Publishers Weekly as "being the first of two volumes, it ends with the word intermission in multicolored capital letters across two pages."

Translation rights for the book were sold in multiple territories, including the United Kingdom, France, Italy, the Netherlands, Spain, and Brazil. The volume was a finalist for the PEN/Jean Stein Book Award and received the Yellow Kid Award for Comic of the Year at Lucca Comics & Games.

== Plot ==
Rusty Brown is a long-form, ongoing narrative centered on a group of interconnected characters originally associated with a private school in Omaha, Nebraska. The story moves between childhood and adulthood, with different sections focusing on individual characters at various stages of their lives.

The opening material is set in 1975. It follows Rusty Brown as a third-grade student, alongside new arrivals Chalky and Alice White, with the events unfolding over the course of a single school day. From this starting point, the narrative expands to include additional characters connected to the school — Jordan Lint, Joanne Cole, W. K. "Woody" Brown, Mr. Ware — with later sections tracing their lives over extended periods of time.

Rather than following a single linear storyline, the narrative is structured as a series of character-focused episodes. Some sections take place over the course of a single day, while others span decades, covering entire lifetimes. These strands intersect through shared settings and relationships, with events in one character's story often reappearing from another's perspective.

The narrative remains ongoing, with material published across multiple formats and time periods.

== Characters ==
- Rusty Brown: The central character. The opening section follows him as a third-grade student at a small private school in Omaha, where he is frequently bullied by classmates. One snowy morning, he imagines that he has developed a superpower — enhanced hearing — and adopts the fantasy identity "Ear Man" (though this has no actual effect on his real-world circumstances). He brings a Supergirl action figure to school, hiding it during class, and becomes fixated on it throughout the day. Rusty is repeatedly targeted by classmate Jordan Lint; he retreats into elaborate daydreams involving heroism and rescue scenarios. His friendship with Chalky White develops when the two boys bond awkwardly over their shared interest in toys. A recurring theme is Rusty's greedy, egocentric, and bold behavior, opposed to Chalky's kind, timid, and often naïve nature. Rusty often utilizes tricks to swindle Chalky of his action figures, while the gullible Chalky is never able to see through Rusty's true nature. In later material from the Rusty Brown series (including earlier newspaper installments and Acme Novelty Library issues), Rusty is depicted as an embittered, socially isolated adult, preoccupied with collecting childhood memorabilia, including action figures, lunchboxes, and novelty drink cups. In these episodes, he organizes his life around his possessions, seeking out rare collectibles while also revisiting past relationships (such as with Chalky White).
- Chalky White: Rusty's friend from childhood. Chalky is introduced, arriving at the school for his first day, alongside his sister Alice (both children have relocated from the fictional town of Waukosha, Michigan, to live with their grandmother). Much of the opening section follows Chalky's attempts to navigate this unfamiliar environment. Chalky observes Rusty’s behavior with curiosity and confusion — their early interactions center on Rusty's Supergirl figure and their shared interests in toys. In material published outside the 2019 volume, Chalky is depicted in adulthood. Chalky still shares Rusty's early enthusiasm for toys and collectibles (including G.I. Joe action figures) but establishes a conventional adult life, including marriage and parenthood. In one sequence, Chalky composes an annual Christmas letter describing his family life in positive terms; parallel scenes, however, depict his disaffected teen daughter, Brittany, writing in her diary about her dissatisfaction with her home life and relationships.
- Alice White: Chalky’s older sister, Alice is introduced as a teenage new student arriving at the school with him on their first day. Her storyline is intercut with those of Chalky and Rusty during the opening sequence. At school, she makes new friends but also mocks a biology lab partner in order to impress a cooler group of girls in art class. Jordan Lint also takes an interest in her. A flashback sequence returns to her earlier life in Michigan and to her friendship with Gretchen, whom she misses after the move; the same material points at upheavals in the White family before their arrival in Nebraska.
- W. K. "Woody" Brown: Rusty’s father and an English teacher at the school attended by Rusty and Chalky; the book chapter "William Brown" depicts both his past and present. As a young man, Woody writes a science fiction story, "The Seeing-Eye Dogs of Mars" — about two couples attempting to colonize Mars with the aid of dogs — which is presented in full within the narrative. The chapter then follows his early adulthood, including a failed romantic relationship and a later instance of voyeurism, alongside present-day scenes in which Woody reflects on his past and considers abandoning his family. A number of scenes include moments where Woody's understanding of events differs from what is shown. In the final scenes, an older Woody shaves his mustache, removes his glasses and looks at himself in the mirror, seeing only a blurred field of colored dots.
- Jordan Lint (full name: Jordan Wellington Lint III): A classmate who bullies Rusty in childhood. A substantial section of the narrative follows his life from infancy to death. As a child, he witnesses his father physically abusing his mother and is taught racist attitudes by him; his mother later dies while Jordan is still young. After her death and his father's remarriage, he begins referring to himself as "Jason." As a teenager, he uses drugs, drops out of school, and pursues a short-lived music career while relying on his father's money. During this time, he is implicated in an incident that leads to the death of a friend — a trauma he returns to repeatedly later in life. As an adult, he works for his father's business, marries, and has a child, but later becomes involved in religion and begins a series of affairs, which leads to the collapse of his marriage. He also engages in financial misconduct, including embezzlement. As an adult, he encounters Rusty in a grocery store and approaches him as if they were close acquaintances, prompting Rusty to flee. In later life, Lint struggles with instability and declining health; he ultimately dies alone.
- Joanne Cole: A teacher at the school attended by Rusty and Chalky, Joanne is the focus of a chapter that follows her life over several decades; she later becomes the school's principal. As an adult, she lives with and cares for her mother in a small apartment. Her routine includes commuting by bus, teaching, participating in church activities, and playing the banjo. In her work at the school, she deals with racism from students, parents, and colleagues. During all this time, she conducts a long-term research project into a historical lynching in Omaha, working in the school library (first using microfiche and later computers). Flashbacks depict her childhood in a poor household, where she helps care for her younger sister and works with her mother cleaning the Lint family home. Her storyline also reveals that, as a teenager, she gave birth to a daughter and placed her for adoption. Near the end of the volume, her daughter, Janice Woods, reenters her life, and the two are reunited. The reunion is prompted by one of Janice's co-workers — Amy Corrigan — linking the narrative to Ware's Jimmy Corrigan, the Smartest Kid on Earth..
- "Mr. Ware": A fictionalized version of Chris Ware who appears as an instructor at the school. Instead of being a successful, published cartoonist, Mr. Ware is depicted as an "aggressively creepy" and "pretentious art teacher" who interacts awkwardly with students. In one scene set during Jordan Lint's adolescence, Mr. Ware smokes marijuana with Jordan and some friends in a parking lot. He also discusses his artistic methods, including his use of hand-drawn dot patterns.

== Themes ==
Critics have described Rusty Brown as a work concerned with perception, memory, and the limits of self-understanding. More broadly, the work addresses cycles of behavior and attempts at change. Characters pursue stability through work, religion, or family life, but often return to earlier patterns. Reviews have described this structure as emphasizing repetition and the difficulty of sustained transformation over time.

Writing in The Comics Journal, Edwin Turner notes that the story's characters are "so bound up in their own consciousnesses that they cannot see the bigger picture that frames them," highlighting the gap between how characters understand their lives and how events unfold.

The book's device of tracing lives across extended periods of time has been noted for emphasizing both repetition and change, with critics citing the "80-page cradle-to-grave study" of Jordan Lint as "an achingly real account of a life of small triumphs [and] desperate disappointments." Writing for the online literary journal SOLRAD, Charles Hatfield similarly emphasizes Ware's attention to perception, noting that "time dilates in Ware, and we sense ourselves sensing things." The work’s fragmented, multi-character structure has also been described as a "linked collection of stories."

Family relationships and their long-term effects are a recurring element. Jordan Lint’s storyline traces the impact of his childhood, including domestic violence and the early death of his mother, across the course of his life, while Joanne Cole’s narrative centers on family separation and eventual reunion.

Joanne’s storyline also addresses race and racism. In The Comics Journal's roundtable on Rusty Brown, Daniel Worden writes that her narrative engages with "the separation of Black families," linking her personal history to broader social contexts. Her experiences as a Black teacher in a predominantly white school, along with her research into a historical lynching, further situate her story within that history. Hatfield identifies Joanne's narrative as a notable shift in tone in the book, describing it as "the very best thing in Rusty Brown" and highlighting its emphasis on "human outreach and sympathy."

Critics have also identified a recurring focus in Rusty Brown on socially isolated male characters — a frequent characteristic of Ware's work — who are saddled with limited forms of self-expression and have difficulty forming meaningful connections. In his review, Hatfield argues that figures such as Rusty Brown, Chalky White, Woody Brown (and the "Mr. Ware" character) embody "self-deluding fantasies" of "toxically self-involved" boys and men, and notes that their stylized names evoke "bullying joke names."

Ware's formal approach in Rusty Brown was also widely discussed. Reviewers frequently note his use of precise page layouts, muted color palettes, and intricate typographic design as central to how the narrative is structured and read.
