= Quimby's Bookstore =

Independent bookstore chain

Coordinates: 41.910720°N 87.674780°W

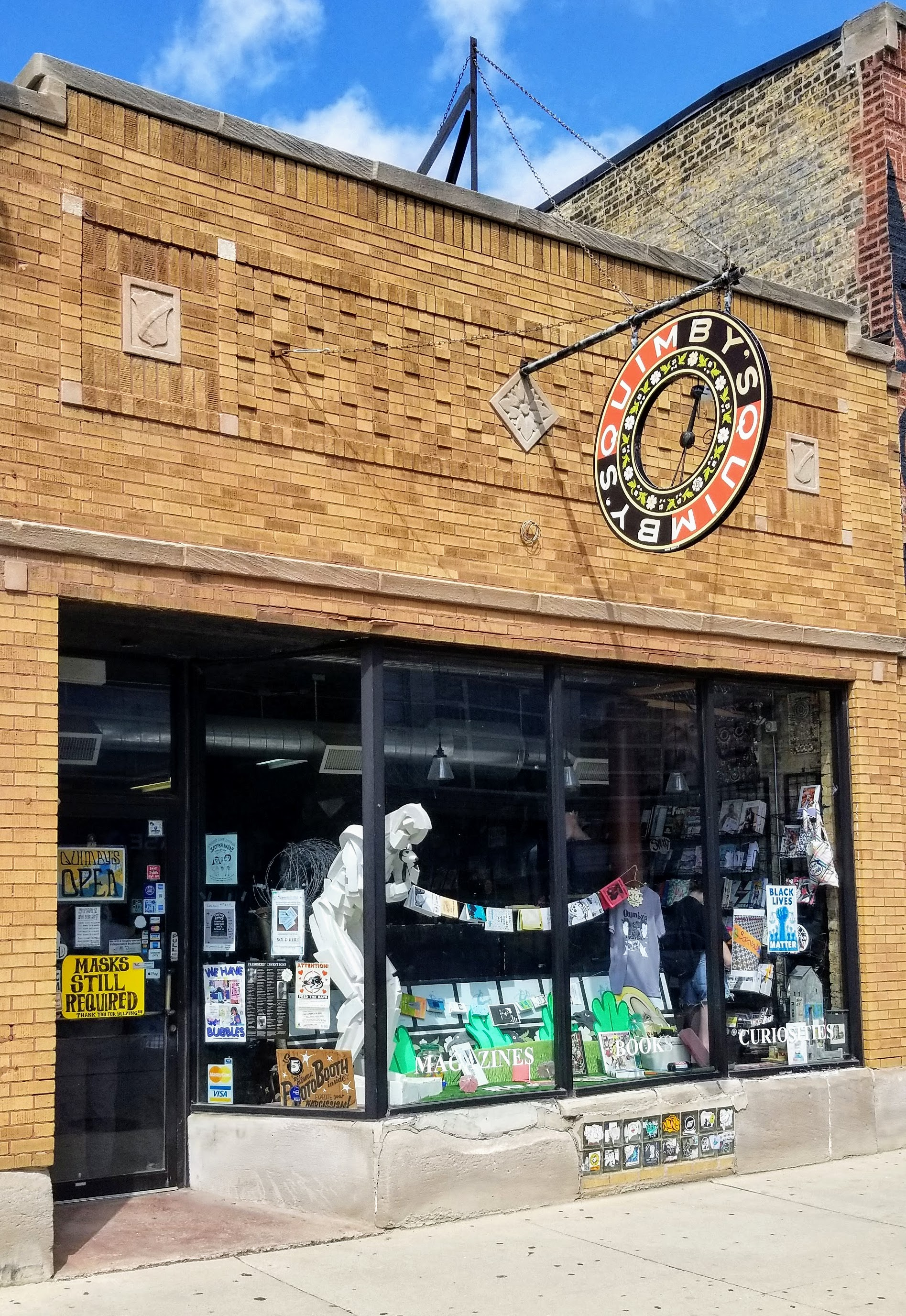
- Industry: Bookseller
- Founded: 1991
- Founder: Steven Svymbersky
- Headquarters: Chicago, Illinois, United States
- Number of locations: 2 stores
- Area served: Chicago metropolitan area; New York metropolitan area
- Products: Independently-published books, comics, and zines
- Owner: Peter Miles Bergman, Cody Kasselman (Chicago), Steven Svymbersky (NYC)
- Website: www.quimbys.com

Quimby's Bookstore is an independent bookstore located at 1854 W. North Ave in the Wicker Park neighborhood of Chicago, Illinois. In addition to the main location, Quimby's NYC opened in 2017 at 536 Metropolitan Ave in the Williamsburg neighborhood of Brooklyn, New York. Quimby's specializes in selling independently published and small press books, zines, comics, and ephemera, describing its collection as favoring "the unusual, the aberrant, the saucy and the lowbrow". The Chicago Tribune has described Quimby's as "a treasure" and "an unofficial clubhouse for zine lovers", and Inc. magazine has featured it as "Chicago's weirdest bookstore".

== Description ==
Along with a curated selection of traditionally published books, Quimby's Bookstore sells independent publications, often featuring bizarre or unusual subject matter. For those who are interested in the DIY ethic and self-publishing, the collection of zines and chapbooks at Quimby's has made it an international destination. Nearly a quarter of the store's stock consists of self-published works purchased on consignment from artists and writers around the world.

Prominent themes in Quimby's stock include feminism, LGBTQ culture, punk, anarchy, and political and cultural resistance; other categories include fringe or counterculture topics such as conspiracies, erotica, and "mayhem".

Both stores host multiple events each month, including author readings, book signings, film screenings, and more. The Chicago store hosts pop-up shops at local events like the Chicago Zine Fest and the Chicago Alternative Comics Expo (CAKE), as well as hosting a yearly "zlumber party," an overnight event for zinesters to work on their creations. Quimby's Chicago is a long time supporter of zinesters and comic artists such as John Porcellino and former employee, Edie Fake.

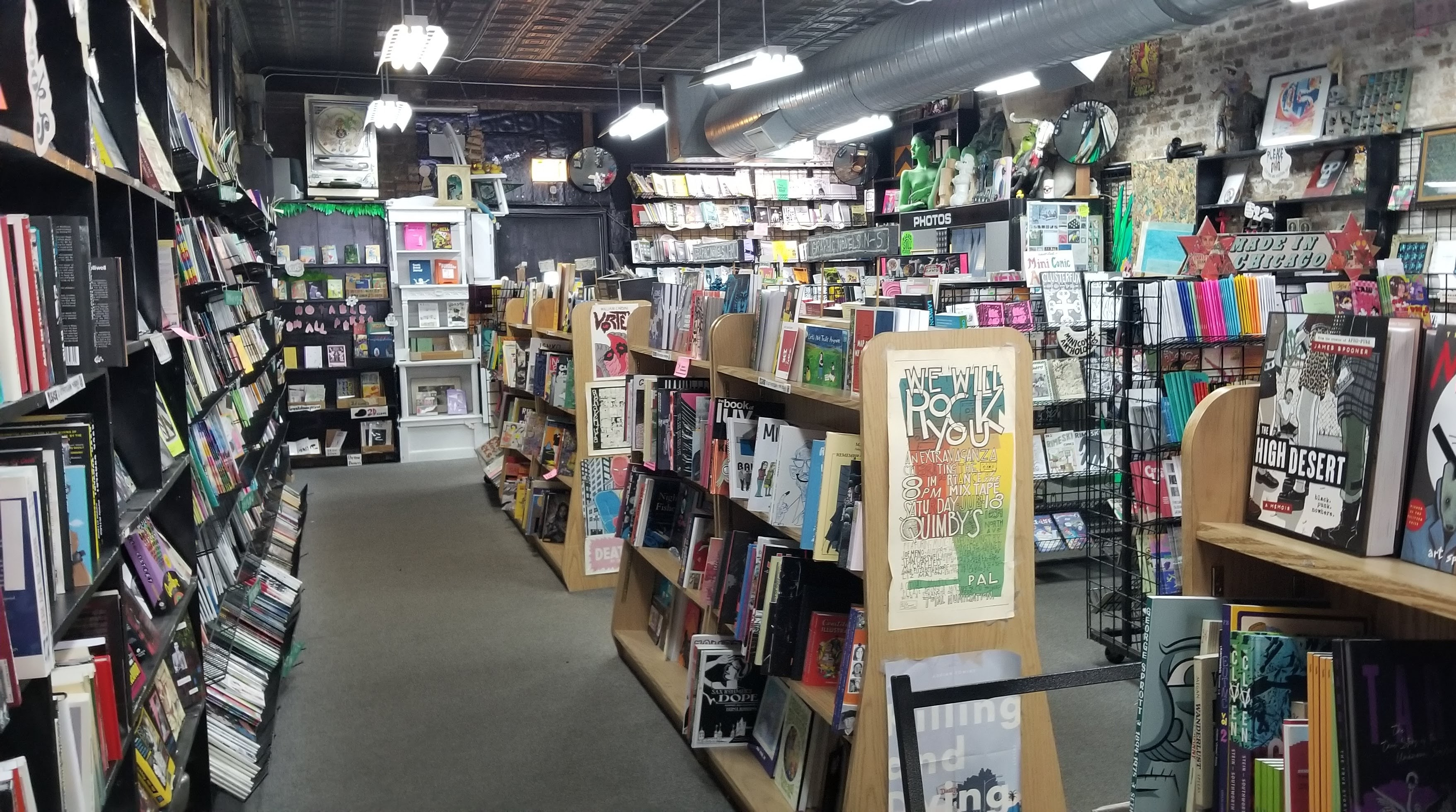
Interior of Quimby's (August 2022)

== History ==
Quimby's was opened September 15, 1991, by Steven Svymbersky; the original location was a former bodega. Svymbersky, who had previously lived in Boston, had run a similar store there called the Primal Plunge.

The name "Quimby's" came from the zine that Svymbersky had published for five years in Boston before moving to Chicago. Cartoonist Chris Ware was an early customer of the store who had coincidentally drawn a comic strip named "Quimby the Mouse"; Ware gave his permission for the mouse character to become the store's mascot, and he has designed each of the stores' logos. By the mid-1990s, Quimby's was a Wicker Park mainstay and helped define the neighborhood for underground culture.

In 1997, Svymbersky sold the store to Eric Kirsammer, owner of Chicago Comics. Soon afterward, Kirsammer bought the property at 1854 W. North Ave and moved the store to its current location. In 2016, the store celebrated its 25th anniversary.

Svymbersky opened Quimby's NYC in 2017; the two bookstores share no financial relationship. Because Quimby's NYC is located near to Desert Island Comics, it does not sell comics or graphic novels.

In December 2024, Kirsimmer announced he would be selling Quimby's, hoping to find a new owner who would keep the store in the building and rent from him. The store was sold to Peter Miles Bergman and Cody Kasselman in April 2025. Bergman and Kasselman brought in Eric Von Haynes as an affiliate owner.

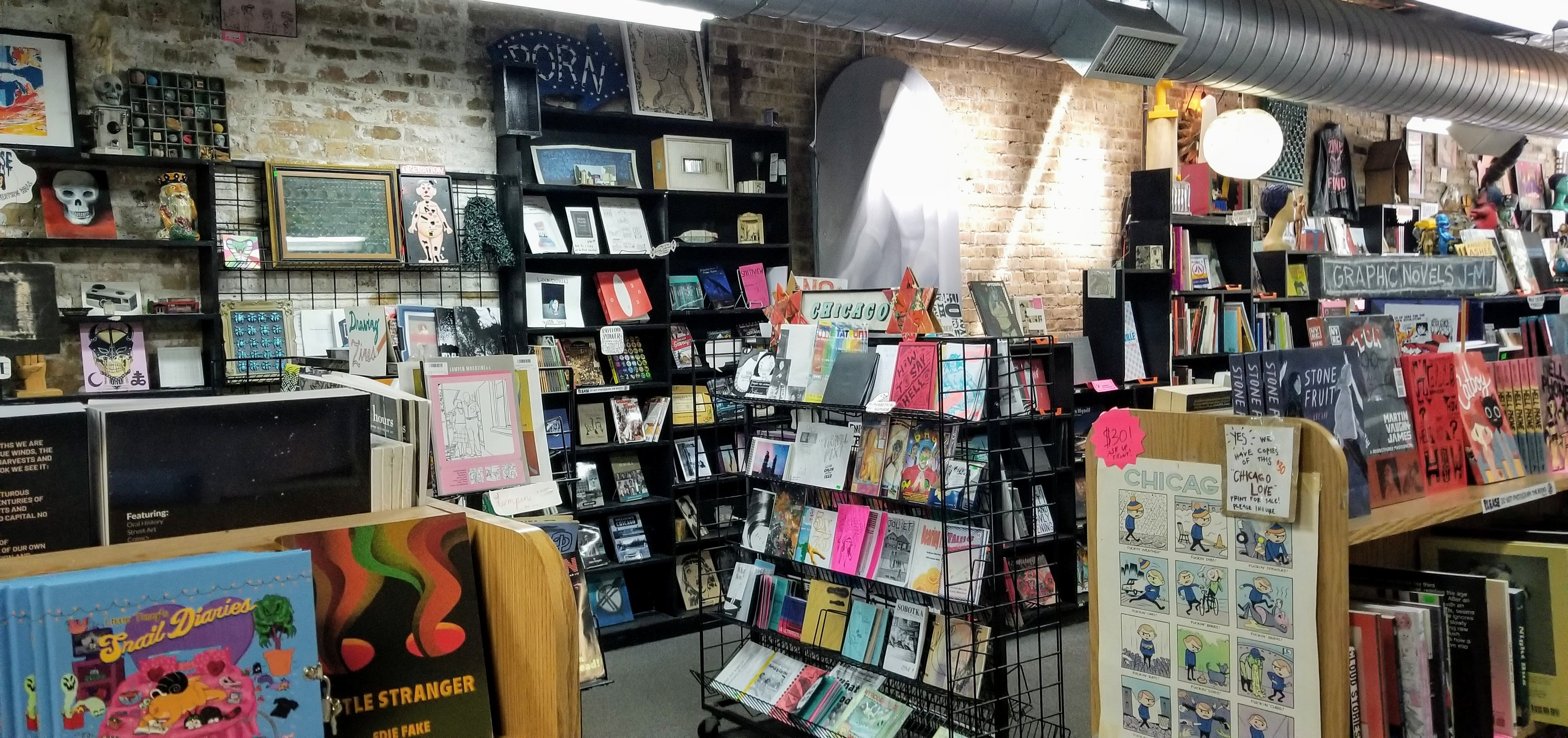
Interior of Quimby's (August 2022)

== See also ==
- Books in the United States
