= Keiler Roberts =

American cartoonist

- Born: 1978 (age 47–48) Milwaukee, Wisconsin, U.S.
- Area: Cartoonist

Keiler Roberts (born 1978) is an American comics artist from Sun Prairie, Wisconsin. In her work, Roberts explores her experience on topics such as motherhood, teaching, mental disorders, and her life with multiple sclerosis from an everyday point of view and with humor. She has been dedicating herself to creating comics since 2009, when her daughter was born, until today, when she combines it with her work as a teacher. She has received the Cartoonist Studio and Ignatz Awards. She was a professor of comics at the School of the Art Institute of Chicago.

== Biography ==
Roberts was born in Milwaukee in 1978, the youngest of four children, but grew up in Sun Prairie, just outside Madison, both in Wisconsin.

In high school, Roberts took many art classes and later studied painting at the University of Wisconsin-Madison (2000) and Northwestern University (2002). She later dedicated herself to teaching, at DePaul University (2005–2018), in Chicago, Illinois, in introductory drawing and figure drawing classes and the Art Institute of Chicago (2013–2021), in comics classes. Roberts already had autobiographical content on her blog, and intended to mix it with images in some way, but she didn't start comics until after a course with Aaron Renier at DePaul University.

Roberts is married to Scott Roberts, also an artist, with whom she has a daughter.

== Bibliography ==
- The Joy of Quitting, 2021 Montreal: Drawn & Quarterly
- My Begging Chart, 2021 Montreal: Drawn & Quarterly
- Creepy. Montreal: Drawn & Quarterly. ISBN 9781770466197.
- Roberts, Keiler (2020). Isolada. Barcelona. ISBN 978-84-121442-4-6. (Original Sunburning, 2017, Toronto: Koyama Press)
- Rat Time, 2019, Toronto: Koyama Press.
- Chlorine Gardens, 2018, Toronto: Koyama Press.
- Happy Happy, Baby Baby, 2017, Evanston: self-published. (New edition by Powdered Milk vol.6 from 2012).
- Miseryland, 2015, Evanston: self-published.
- Powdered Milk: Collected Stories, 2012, Evanston: self-published.

Other publications

- #40 'The Very End', December 2020
- The Best American Comics, 2018. Guess editor, Phoebe Gloeckner, series editor, Bill Kartalopoulos, published by Houghton Mifflin Harcourt
- Pen America, 17 May 2017. Edited by Robert Kirby
- The Best American Comics, 2016. Guess editor, Roz Chast, series editor, Bill Kartalopoulos, published by Houghton Mifflin Harcourt
- Nat. Brut, No. 5, Early Edition, 2015. Curated by Kayla E. and Bill Kartalopoulos
- Darling Sleeper, 2015. Edited by Jesse Lucas
- “Treats for Dogs.” Chicago Reader Comics Issue, 2ebruary 25, 2014
- MUTHA Magazine regular contributor since September 2013
- Linework: "Individually Wrapped Snacks." Newcity, January 10, 2014. Edited Ivan Brunetti and Aaron Renier.
- Nashville Review, Vanderbilt University, Summer 2011 and Spring 2010 issues

== Awards and honors ==
- 2019 Slate's Cartoonist Studio Prize for Best Print Comic of 2018, selected by The Slate Book Review and The Center for Cartoon Studies
- 2018 nomination for 3Arts Award
- 2017 Ignatz Award nomination - Outstanding Comic for Sunburning
- 2016 Ignatz Award - Outstanding Series for Powdered Milk
- 2015 Special guest, CAKE - Chicago Alternative Comics Expo
- 2014, 2015 The Best American Comics 2014, Notables List
- 2014 Ignatz Award nomination in two categories - Outstanding Series and Promising New Talent
- 2014 Special guest, Chicago Zine Fest
- 2013 Ignatz Award nomination - Best Minicomic
- 2000 Northwestern University Fellowship
