= The Ragtime Ephemeralist =

American music magazine

The Ragtime Ephemeralist was an infrequently-published magazine about ragtime music put together by cartoonist and ragtime aficionado Chris Ware. The first issue was published in 1998. It was based in Oak Park, Illinois. As of 2019 only three issues were published, the last appearing in 2002.
