= Quimby the Mouse =

Comic strip character

- Creator: Chris Ware
- Date: Aug 2003
- Main characters: Quimby the Mouse; Quimbies the Mouse; Sparky
- Page count: 68 pages
- Publisher: Fantagraphics

Original publication
- Published in: Raw; The Daily Texan; Newcity; Acme Novelty Library
- Date of publication: 1990-1997
- ISBN: 9781560974857 (hardcover)

Chronology
- Preceded by: Jimmy Corrigan, the Smartest Kid on Earth
- Followed by: The Acme Novelty Date Book

Quimby the Mouse is a recurring cartoon character created by American cartoonist Chris Ware. The character appears in a series of largely wordless, single-page comic strips produced in the early 1990s and later collected in the book Quimby the Mouse (Fantagraphics, 2003). The strips are among Ware's earliest published works and are often discussed as a foundational stage in the development of his thematic and formal concerns.

== Publication history ==
The character later known as Quimby the Mouse first appeared under that name in Raw, the avant-garde comics anthology edited by Art Spiegelman and Françoise Mouly, in the issues "Required Reading for the Post-Literate" (1990) and "High Culture for Lowbrows" (1991). (This followed earlier, unnamed mouselike figures Ware produced while a student at the University of Texas at Austin, some of which appeared in the student newspaper The Daily Texan.)

After these initial appearances in Raw, Quimby was published as a series of largely wordless, single-page Quimby strips in The Daily Texan. Following Ware's move to Chicago and his transition to a professional cartooning career, additional Quimby strips appeared in the Chicago-area alternative weekly Newcity (1994–1997).

Quimby-related material was later incorporated into Ware’s serialized comic-book project Acme Novelty Library. Issue #2 (Fantagraphics, Summer 1994) featured a substantial number of Quimby strips, while issue #4 (Winter 1994–1995), titled "Sparky’s Best Comics and Stories," included further Quimby material emphasizing the character Sparky, a disembodied cat’s head who frequently appears alongside Quimby. Additional Quimby strips appeared sporadically in later issues of Acme Novelty Library, including issue #15 (Winter 2001–2002).

Much of this material was later revised, reordered, and redesigned for book publication. The hardcover collection Quimby the Mouse (Fantagraphics, 2003) gathers strips from multiple sources — including Raw, The Daily Texan, Newcity, and Acme Novelty Library — without preserving original periodical titles or publication contexts.

== Origins and creation of Quimby ==
Chris Ware has described the creation of Quimby the Mouse as emerging from a period of artistic uncertainty and formal experimentation during his early years as a cartoonist. In a public interview with Ira Glass, Ware explained that Quimby arose from what he described as the "death" of a previous character (known colloquially as Potato Man), prompting a "desperate search for a new character" that could generate narrative energy and emotional meaning.

During this period, Ware experimented with "cartoon faces created more or less by drawing Mickey Mouse without ears," producing strips centered on a solitary, emotionally isolated mouselike figure. These early strips, published in The Daily Texan, were withdrawn after members of the school's Black Student Alliance objected that the earless mouse resembled racist minstrel show imagery.

Ware subsequently reworked and revived the character after coming to the attention of Spiegelman and Mouly. It was in Raw that the character first appeared under the name "Quimby," marking the beginning of its wider recognition. Ware has emphasized that Quimby was not conceived as a direct parody or critique of Mickey Mouse, instead situating the character within a broader historical lineage of mice in visual storytelling.

Ware has further linked the evolution of Quimby's form and narrative to personal loss, particularly the illness and death of his grandmother. During this period, Ware began producing wordless strips and experimenting with doubled or two-headed versions of the character ("Quimbies the Mouse"), which he described as allegorical representations of aging, dependency, and mortality. In discussing this shift, Ware cited his desire to abandon explanatory text in favor of purely visual storytelling, inspired in part by the rhythmic and musical qualities he perceived in early comic strips such as Krazy Kat.

During the character’s early periodical appearances, Ware also used differing strip titles to signal shifts in narrative emphasis rather than separate continuities. Strips published under the title "Quimby the Mouse" frequently depict Quimby alone or in doubled form, and tend to emphasize interior reflection, memory, and autobiographical themes. By contrast, strips titled "Sparky’s Best Comics & Stories" foreground the disembodied cat's head Sparky and focus more explicitly on the fraught, asymmetrical relationship between the two characters, often staging scenes of dependency, care, or cruelty beneath the ironic framing of a children's-comics pastiche. While the distinction is not absolute, it reflects Ware's use of titling as a means of shaping tone and emotional focus rather than indicating separate narrative worlds.

== Character and themes ==
Quimby is a small, anthropomorphic mouse rendered in a style reminiscent of early American newspaper comics, particularly George Herriman's Ignatz Mouse from Krazy Kat. Comparisons to early Mickey Mouse also apply. The strips are primarily silent pantomimes and are loosely episodic rather than serialized in a conventional narrative sense.

Quimby's behavior shifts dramatically from strip to strip. At times he appears affectionate and emotionally dependent on his companion Sparky, a disembodied cat who moves in a small wheeled cart; at other times Quimby acts with sudden cruelty or indifference. Critic Joshua Glenn characterizes Quimby as fitting within the "rebellious scamp" motif of cartoon mice. These tonal reversals, often unexplained within the narrative, create an unsettling emotional rhythm. Recurrent motifs include abandonment, loss, guilt, longing, and the unpredictable nature of attachment.

In several strips, Quimby is depicted alone in large, empty domestic spaces, emphasizing isolation and emotional dislocation. He also functions as a narrator for autobiographical material, particularly Ware's memories of childhood and his relationship with his grandmother. Variations on the character include "Quimbies the Mouse," in which two Quimby figures share a single body, repeatedly enacting cycles of illness, decline, and loss. This visual device has been interpreted as embodying both Ware and his grandmother, or the coexistence of youth and age within a single body.

Critics and scholars have identified Quimby the Mouse as one of Ware's most autobiographical works. Ware has linked the creation of the strips to two distinct autobiographical phases: the earliest Quimby material was closely tied to his grief following the illness and death of his grandmother, while a later set of strips was shaped more by the dissolution of a romantic relationship. The repeated depiction of a single house — modeled on Ware's grandmother's home — is a central visual motif, producing a cumulative effect akin to immersion in prolonged mourning.

Despite their somber subject matter, the strips frequently employ dark or absurd humor. Ware's use of comedy has been described as a form of empathetic or self-directed schadenfreude, encouraging readers to recognize their own emotional vulnerabilities within the exaggerated behavior of the characters.

== Form and style ==
Quimby the Mouse is notable for Ware's early formal experimentation. The strips are often composed of unusually small panels arranged in dense sequences, creating an illusion of motion comparable to early animation devices such as a zoetrope. Ware later extended this idea by designing a cut-out zoetrope featuring Quimby, which readers could assemble to view a short animated "silent film".

Ware has frequently described his approach to comics as architectural and musical, with panels functioning as structural and rhythmic elements rather than simple narrative containers. This approach is evident in Quimby, where panel size, spacing, and repetition contribute as much to meaning as character action.

The collected edition of Quimby the Mouse is also notable for its high production values, including thick paper stock, embossed gold ink on the hardcover, and a careful balance of color and black-and-white strips. Unusually, Ware advises readers on the first page not to purchase the book, arguing that it does not reflect the standards of his later work. This disclaimer, paired with the book's running joke that it is a discarded library book, underscores both the ephemeral quality of comics and Ware's self-reflexive humor.

== Legacy ==
Although created early in Ware's career, Quimby the Mouse is frequently cited as a key precursor to later works such as Jimmy Corrigan, the Smartest Kid on Earth and Building Stories. Scholars and critics have noted that the strips establish Ware's characteristic blend of formal rigor, emotional introspection, and ironic engagement with the history of American newspaper comics.

Quimby the Mouse acts as mascot for the Chicago independent retailer Quimby's Bookstore. Ware was an early customer of the store who had coincidentally already created Quimby the Mouse. Ware gave permission for his mouse character to become the store's mascot, and he has designed each of the stores' logos.

== See also ==
- Ignatz Mouse
- Mickey Mouse
- Mickey Rat
- Maus
