= Mark Aguhar =

American artist and activist

- Born: Mark Cagaanan Aguhar; May 16, 1987; Houston, Texas, United States
- Died: March 12, 2012 (aged 24); Chicago, Illinois, United States
- Education: University of Illinois at Chicago (MFA), University of Texas at Austin (BA)

Mark Cagaanan Aguhar (May 16, 1987 – March 12, 2012) was an American activist, writer and multimedia fine artist known for her multidisciplinary work about gender, beauty and existing as a racial minority, while being body positive and transgender femme-identified. Aguhar was made famous by her Tumblr blog that questioned the mainstream representation of the "glossy glorification of the gay white male body".

== Life ==
Aguhar was born May 16, 1987, in Houston, Texas, in a Filipino American family. She lived in the Houston area for most of her life and graduated from Bellaire High School in 2005. She attended the University of Texas at Austin and earned three Bachelor's degrees in 2009: a Bachelor of Fine Arts degree in Studio Art, a Bachelor of Arts in Art with Honors, and a Bachelor of Arts with High Honors.

After graduating, she worked in Houston for a year at The Menil Collection, a museum that houses the art collection of founders John de Menil and Dominique de Menil. She then pursued a Master's in Fine Arts at the University of Illinois at Chicago.

Aguhar's works include performance-based pieces, watercolors, collages, and photography. Many of these works were self-portraits.

Aguhar maintained an online presence on Tumblr, which hosted both her professional and personal websites. As Tumblr user "calloutqueen," she titled her blog "BLOGGING FOR BROWN GURLS," posting her thoughts about sexuality, sex, dating, gender, and her work.

"My work is about visibility. My work is about the fact that I'm a genderqueer person of color fat femme fag feminist and I don't really know what to do with that identity in this world. It's that thing where you grew up learning to hate every aspect of yourself and unlearning all that misery is really hard to do. It's that thing where you kind of regret everything you've ever done because it's so complicit with white hegemony. It's that thing where you realize that your own attempts at passive aggressive manipulation and power don't stand a chance against the structural forms of domination against your body. It's that thing where the only way to cope with the reality of your situation is to pretend it doesn't exist; because flippancy is a privilege you don't own but you're going to pretend you do anyway."

— Mark Aguhar

Aguhar was only a few months away from earning her MFA degree from University of Illinois at Chicago (UIC) when she died by suicide in Chicago, Illinois, on March 12, 2012.

== Legacy ==
Since 2012, there is a "Mark Aguhar Memorial Grant" available through Chances Dances for queer artists of color.

In 2013, artist Edie Fake had the exhibition titled, "Memory Palaces" in Chicago and paid tribute to five artists and friends that had died, one of which was Mark Aguhar.

The 2015–2016 exhibition, Bring Your Own Body: Transgender between archives and aesthetics, started the tour at Cooper Union and was created in order to explore the meaning of trans and what defines transgender aesthetic in many different forms of artwork. Other transgender artists and archivists participating in this exhibition included: Niv Acosta, Math Bass, Effy Beth, Justin Vivian Bond, Pauline Boudry / Renate Lorenz, Vaginal Davis, Zackary Drucker, Chloe Dzubilo, Tourmaline with Sasha Wortzel, Juliana Huxtable, Greer Lankton, Pierre Molinier, Genesis Breyer P-Orridge, Flawless Sabrina, Buzz Slutzky, and Chris Vargas with the Museum of Transgender Hirstory and Art.

Her poem "Litanies to My Heavenly Brown Body" was widely circulated after the 2016 Orlando nightclub shooting.

In the publication "Proximity: On the Work of Mark Aguhar," (2015), writer Roy Pérez examines Aguhar's drawings, videos, live acts, and writings as performances of closeness, and as critiques of racism, transphobia, and fat phobia. Pérez highlights the complexity of Aguhar's queerness and "not wanting to form attachments within the dominant normative society".

== Select exhibitions ==
- 2009: No Lone Zone, Creative Research Lab, Austin, Texas
- 2009: New American Talent, The Twenty-fourth Exhibition, Arthouse at the Jones Center, Contemporary Art for Texas, Austin, Texas
- 2010: Ideas of Mountains, Creative Research Laboratory, Austin, Texas
- 2010: Boiz Club, Box13 ArtSpace, Houston, Texas
- 2011: M4M, Lawndale Art Center, Houston, Texas
- 2012: Torch Song, Gallery 400, University of Illinois at Chicago (UIC), Chicago, Illinois
- 2012: The Dragon is the Frame Performances, Gallery 400, University of Illinois at Chicago (UIC), Chicago, Illinois
- 2015: Bring Your Own Body: Transgender between archives and aesthetics, 41 Cooper Gallery, The Cooper Union, New York City, New York
- 2016: Bring Your Own Body: Transgender between archives and aesthetics, Glass Curtain Gallery, Columbia College Chicago, Chicago, Illinois
- 2016: Bring Your Own Body: Transgender between archives and aesthetics, Cantor Fitzgerald Gallery, Haverford College, Haverford, Pennsylvania
- 2019: "Nobody Promised You Tomorrow": Art 50 Years After Stonewall, Brooklyn Museum, Brooklyn, New York
