= Acme Novelty Library =

Comic book series by Chris Ware

- Cover of Acme Novelty Library No. 1 by Chris Ware

Publication information
- Publisher: Fantagraphics (1–15); Self-published (16–current)
- Format: Ongoing series
- Publication date: 1993–present
- No. of issues: 20 (plus a special folio issue)

Creative team
- Written by: Chris Ware
- Artist: Chris Ware

Acme Novelty Library is a comic book series created by Chicago cartoonist Chris Ware. Its first issue appeared in 1993. Published from 1994 by Fantagraphics Books and later self-published, it is considered a significant work in alternative comics, selling over 20,000 copies per issue.

== Format, style and content ==
Acme Novelty Library has adopted numerous formats in the course of the series and, similarly, does not feature a continuous cast of characters. It has showcased early Ware comics, such as Quimby the Mouse from The Daily Texan, and more recent strips from NewCity, a Chicago weekly paper.

Ware's first major graphic novel, Jimmy Corrigan, the Smartest Kid on Earth, was originally serialized in Acme Novelty Library between 1995 and 2000. Jimmy Corrigan is the saga of a lonely childlike man and his alienated ancestors, partly inspired by Ware's hopeful but unhappy reunion with his absentee father. The collected edition was released to much acclaim, winning the Guardian First Book Award, amongst others.

Rusty Brown and Building Stories began serialization in issue 16. With this issue, Ware also began to self-publish the title, with Fantagraphics and later Drawn & Quarterly acting as distributor. When asked why he chose to self-publish Ware stated:

"Well, it's for a complicated variety of reasons, but mostly it was because I realized a year or two ago that I simply wasn't really inspired to do it any more, and when I imagined taking over every aspect of it myself, I was suddenly inspired, almost anxious, to work on it again. In short, it just feels a little more like "art" to me now, since I'm responsible for everything that goes into it, and there's no one to blame but myself if it's awful..."

Issues are imbued with the defining characteristics of Ware's work; a pervasive sadness and nihilism permeate tales of disappointment, thwarted affection, and the dehumanization of the individual in a modern and mechanized world. Through the use of apparently extraneous novelties, such as cut-outs and flip-books, and prose parodies set in tiny fonts, Ware blurs the boundaries between author/reader/character. These interventions offer complex and simultaneous multilinear readings of the page that serve to thematise Ware's engagement with issues of narrative and continuity.

== Acme Novelty Library series ==
Issues 1–15 were published by Fantagraphics Books. Ware started self-publishing the series starting with #16, which was distributed by Fantagraphics, with subsequent issues distributed by Drawn & Quarterly. After a 16-year hiatus, issue #21 was announced with a November of 2026 publishing date.

Issues of Acme Novelty Library
#	Main Content	Publisher	Date	Notes
1	Jimmy Corrigan	Fantagraphics Books	Winter 1993–1994	
2	Quimby the Mouse	Fantagraphics Books	Summer 1994	
3	Potato Guy	Fantagraphics Books	Fall 1994	
4	Sparky	Fantagraphics Books	Winter 1994–1995	
5	Jimmy Corrigan, pt 1	Fantagraphics Books	Spring 1995	
6	Jimmy Corrigan, pt 2	Fantagraphics Books	Fall 1995	
7	Joke Book: Big Tex; Rocket Sam	Fantagraphics Books	Summer 1996	
8	Jimmy Corrigan, pt 3	Fantagraphics Books	Winter 1996–1997	
9	Jimmy Corrigan, pt 4	Fantagraphics Books	Winter 1997	
10	Mail Order Catalogue, Jimmy Corrigan (Note: Reprinted, with some reformatting, from BLAB! issues #7-8 (Kitchen Sink Press, Winter 1992 and Summer 1995). A small handful of panels from the earlier chapters that included "Super-Man" were replaced in this version with brand new panels.)	Fantagraphics Books	Spring 1998	
11	Jimmy Corrigan, pt 5	Fantagraphics Books	1998	
12	Jimmy Corrigan, pt 6	Fantagraphics Books	1999	
13	Jimmy Corrigan, pt 7	Fantagraphics Books	Autumn 1999	
14	Jimmy Corrigan, pt 8	Fantagraphics Books	Spring 2000	
15	Joke Book II: Rocket Sam; Tales From The Future; Quimby the Mouse; Rusty Brown	Fantagraphics Books	Winter 2001–2002	
16	Rusty Brown, pt 1; Building Stories, pt 1	Self-published	2005	hardcover; distributed by Fantagraphics
17	Rusty Brown, pt 2; Branford, the Best Bee in the World	Self-published	Fall/Winter 2006	hardcover; distributed by Drawn & Quarterly
18	Building Stories, pt 2	Self-published	2007	hardcover; distributed by Drawn & Quarterly
19	Rusty Brown, pt 3	Self-published	2008	hardcover; distributed by Drawn & Quarterly
20	Lint (featuring Jordon Wellington Lint, a character from Ware's Rusty Brown series)	Self-published	2010	hardcover; distributed by Drawn & Quarterly
21	3 individual 24-page comics enclosed in a box with supplementary materials, including "The Last Saturday #6" and "Alice"	Self-published	2026	hardcover; distributed by Drawn & Quarterly

Issue 18 1/2 was published in 2007 containing Ware's "Thanksgiving" covers for the November 26, 2006, issue of The New Yorker, plus supplementary material, in portfolio format.

The title has been collected into volumes published by Pantheon Books (US), Fantagraphics Books (US) and Jonathan Cape (UK):

- Jimmy Corrigan, the Smartest Kid on Earth (2000), Pantheon / Cape (collects issue 5, 6, 8, 9 and 11–14).
- Quimby the Mouse (2003), Fantagraphics / Cape (collects issues 2 and 4 with additional material).
- The Acme Novelty Library Final Report to Shareholders and Rainy Day Saturday Afternoon Fun Book (2005), Pantheon / Cape (collects issues 7 and 15 with additional material, including parody ads and the ACME company "tour").
- Building Stories (2012), Pantheon Books Pantheon / Cape (collects issue 18 with material from issue 16, other periodicals, and new material).
- Rusty Brown (2019), Pantheon Books (collects material from issues 16, 17, 19, 20, as well as new material).

Numbers 1, 3, and 10 are the only issues to remain uncollected at this time.

== Awards ==
The series has been widely recognized in the industry.

The series won the Eisner Award for Best Continuing Series of 1996 and 2000; Best New Graphic Album of 2000; and Best Publication Design of 1995, 1996, 1997, and 2002. Furthermore, an Acme Novelty Library display stand won the Eisner Award for Best Comics-Related Product of 1998. Ware won the Eisner Award for his work in Acme Novelty Library for Best Artist/Writer-Drama of 2008; Best Artist/Writer of 2009; Best Colorist of 1996, 1998, 2001 and 2006; and Best Letterer of 2009.

The series won the Harvey Award for Best New Series of 1995; Best Continuing or Limited Series of 2000 and 2001; Best Single Issue or Story of 1997 and 2000; and Harvey Special Award for Excellence in Presentation every year from 1995 to 2000. Ware won the Harvey Award for his work in Acme Novelty Library for Best Cartoonist of 2006; Best Letterer of 1996, 2000, 2002, and 2006; Best Cover Artist of 2000; and Best Colorist of 1996, 1997, 1998, 2000 and 2002.

The series won Ignatz Awards for Outstanding Series of 1997, 1998; Outstanding Comic of 1998 and 2000; Outstanding Story of 2000 (Jimmy Corrigan); and Outstanding Graphic Novel of 2009.

Other awards won by Acme Novelty Library include 1999 National Cartoonists Society's Award for Best Comic Book and Good Taste Awards for Best New Series of 1994; Best Continuing Series of 1995, 1996, 1997, 1999, and 2000; Best Single Issue of 1996, 1999, and 2000; Best Ongoing Serialized Story of 1999 (Jimmy Corrigan); and Best Production Design of 1998, 1999, and 2000.
