= Larry Marder =

American cartoonist and writer (born 1951)

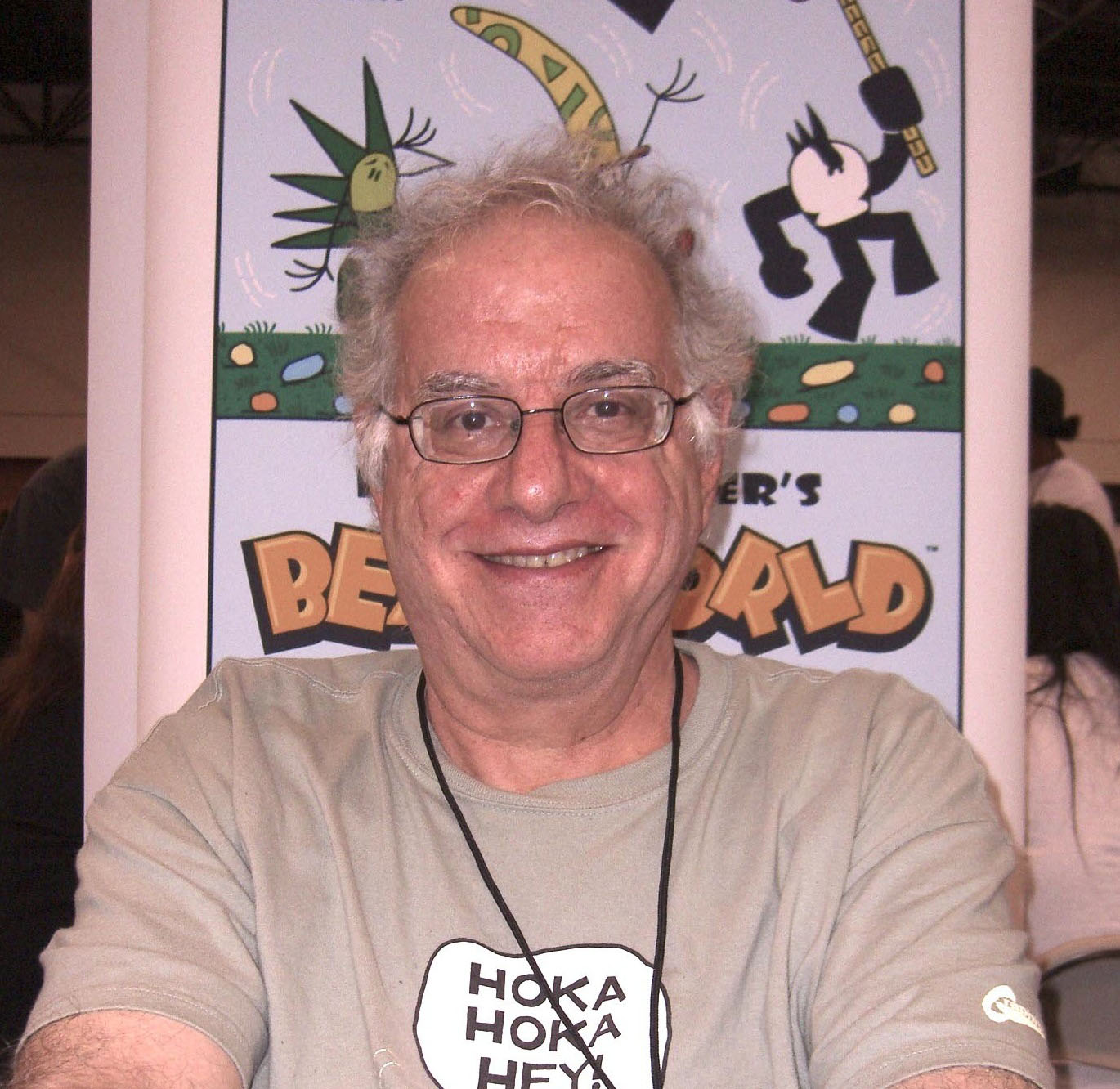
- Marder at the New York Comic Con in Manhattan, October 10, 2010
- Born: Lawrence Marder; May 29, 1951 (age 75) Chicago, Illinois, U.S.
- Area: Cartoonist
- Notable works: Tales of the Beanworld

Larry Marder (born May 29, 1951) is an American cartoonist and writer, best known as the creator of comic book Tales of the Beanworld, which began as an "essentially self-published title" in 1984. Beginning in 2009, Dark Horse Books began to reprint Tales of the Beanworld, in two volumes, and then went on to publish two more volumes of new Beanworld comics.

== Early life ==
Marder was educated at the Hartford Art School in Connecticut in the early 1970s, earning a BFA degree in 1973. He earned "his living as an art director in the high-pressure world of advertising" in Chicago from 1976, balancing his time in that profession with "a remarkable interior landscape of the imagination that coalesced into the vivid ecology of Beanworld".

He cites as his major influences Jack Kirby, Rudolph Zallinger, Henry Darger and Marcel Duchamp.

== Career ==
=== Beanworld ===
Marder's Tales of the Beanworld began as a "collection of character sketches and concepts" that is described by Stanley Wiater and Stephen R. Bissette in Comic Book Rebels as "an essentially self-published comic (though distributed through Eclipse Comics)", launched in 1984. Marder initially self-published the series before it was picked up by Eclipse Comics in 1985 – though it continued to bear Marder's own Beanworld Press imprint.

In a short period of time, the comic "evolved into what Marder terms 'a weird fantasy dimension that operates under its own rules and laws.'" Wiater and Bissette also term it:

a reading experience that ... [creates] a delightfully accessible, resonant, and almost alchemical bond with readers of all ages.

The initial idea hit Marder when he was in art school, and "swept up in the conceptual art movement['s mantra] ... 'Down with the object. Down with form. Idea is everything,'" which led him to "create comics where idea was everything". Removing the human figure, he "came up with something that would work in comics: the Bean figures", and began "goofing around with these figures". Revising and refining his characters through "political cartoons on Watergate and so on, that were published in my college newspapers using these Bean characters", although he came up with the characters in 1972, "the storyline didn't really come together until 1982".

In the first collected volume, Marder explains that his work is "about the affinity of life", wherein the characters "understand that ultimately they depend on each other for survival". Wiater and Bissette see in this relationship as a wider metaphor for the interdependency of the comics industry. Indeed, addressing the potential underlying complexity, Marder suggests that "it's harder to describe it than it is to read it". He also calls it "an ecological romance ... a self-contained fairy tale about a group of beings who live in the center of their perfect world [and are] obsessed with maintaining its food chain", a self-described "really low concept!" Equally, he says, "the reader has to invest a certain amount of mental energy to follow the book", which includes "maps and a rather long glossary". Despite these potentially conflicting comments, Wiater and Bissette reiterate that "there is no simpler or more iconographic comic book in existence".

Marder ultimately suggests that

Beanworld is the exact opposite of most modern comics. The artwork is really simple and the storyline's quite complex. Most comics have complicated artwork supporting very simple storylines ... Obviously Beanworld works on two levels ... like Rocky and Bullwinkle in the sense that there are many levels of complexity the reader can draw from the story, but the surface level is accessible enough for children to enjoy it, which is something that took me completely by surprise.

In April 2008, at the Stumptown Comics Fest, Marder announced that he would resurrect Beanworld with Dark Horse Comics "sometime early next year [2009]". Diana Schutz was set to edit the resurrected series, which would also be collected by Dark Horse.

=== Other work ===
Marder was involved with "the DLG – Direct Line Group – which [was] a coalition of fifteen retailers that was put together by Gary Colabuono of Moondog's ... [as] an opportunity for the large chain retailers to have a forum to discuss their problems and pool their resources to figure out how they can best help themselves in [comics'] new marketplace". Marder, speaking in 1992 or 1993, suggested that "distributors are ... not focused much on helping the established comic book stores expand", and hoped that the DLG would aid in "promot[ing] environments that are going to help alternative comics grow". Working with Moondog's, Marder described the paradox of "a situation where retailers want the books, and the publishers have the books, but somehow they can't get them to more readers".

He was appointed Executive Director of Image Comics in 1993 (leaving in 1999), and was president of Image-co-founder Todd McFarlane's action figure arm, McFarlane Toys from 1999–2007.

Marder served as President of the Comic Book Legal Defense Fund, a non-profit organization founded in 1986 chartered to protect the First Amendment rights of the comics community, from 2010 to 2018.

== Partial bibliography ==
The following feature work by Larry Marder.

- Tales Of The Beanworld #1-#21 (Eclipse Comics)
  - Larry Marder's Beanworld Book 1 (Collects #1–4)
  - Larry Marder's Beanworld Book 2 (Collects #5–7)
  - Larry Marder's Beanworld Book 3 (Collects #8–11)
  - Larry Marder's Beanworld Book 4 (Collects #12–16)
- Larry Marder's Beanworld Book 1, Dark Horse Books, Collects #1-9
- Larry Marder's Beanworld Book 2, Dark Horse Books, Collects #10-21
- Larry Marder's Beanworld Book 3, Dark Horse Books, all new material
- Larry Marder's Beanworld Book 3.5, Dark Horse Books, Collects stories from Asylum 1-4, Larry Marder's Beanworld Holiday Special, MySpace Dark Horse Presents #14
- Larry Marder's Beanworld Book 4, Dark Horse Books, all new material
- Amazing Heroes #100, #136
- The Art Of Jack Kirby
- Asylum #1–2
- Feature v2#1, #5; v3#2, #4 (fanzine by Charles Brownstein)
- Freak Force #?
- Gen13 #13B
  - Gen13 #13A B and C Collected Edition
- Giant-size Mini Comics #1 (Marder also edited #2–4)
- Goofy Service Doodle Book (ashcan)
- Grimjack #42
- "Introduction" to Hepcats: Snowblind
- Hungry? (ashcan)
- Images Of Omaha #2
- Lady Arcane #2
- "Letter of comment" in Mars #8
- "Introduction" to Megaton Man: The Apocalypse Affiliation
- normalman #6
- normalman/Megaton Man #1
- 'Essay on Jack Kirby' in Phantom Force #2
- Rip Off Comix #17 (script only)
- Scout #17
- Shadowhawk #17
- Shadowhawk Gallery #1
- "Introduction" to Shi/Cyblade #1
- Total Eclipse #3–5
- Zot! #4

=== Interviews/reviews ===
- Amazing Heroes #200
- Bissette, Wiater (eds) Comic Book Rebels (1993)
- Comics Interview #142/#143
- Comics Scene #31
- The Comics Journal #201 (and others)
- Hero Illustrated #11
- Image Illustrated
- Wizard #22
- Online interview by Jeremy York

=== References, allusions and homages ===
(incomplete)

Beans by other artists and references to Marder/Beanworld appear in at least the following publications:

- Amazing Heroes #185
- Cerebus #200
- Dr. Fate #41
- Giant-size Mini Comics #1
- Hate #8
- Marvels #3
- Patty Cake #7 by Scott Roberts (Permanent Press, 1996)
- Shi/Cyblade #1
- Sleaze Castle: The Director's Cut Part Zero
- Thor #340
- Scott McCloud's Understanding Comics
- Wandering Star #5, #9
- Zot! #21, #30–31, #34
