= Jimmy Corrigan, the Smartest Kid on Earth =

Graphic novel

- Hardback cover
- Creator: Chris Ware
- Date: 2000
- Main characters: Jimmy Corrigan
- Page count: 380 pages
- Publisher: Pantheon Books

Original publication
- Published in: Acme Novelty Library
- Date of publication: 1995–2000
- ISBN: 978-0375714542

Jimmy Corrigan: The Smartest Kid on Earth is a graphic novel by American cartoonist Chris Ware. Pantheon Books released the book in 2000 following its serialization in the newspaper Newcity and Ware's Acme Novelty Library series.

== Origins and development ==
The character of Jimmy Corrigan originated in Ware's early comic strips around 1990 as a parody of Depression-era "child genius" comics. In a 2000 Q&A, Ware recalled creating the character as a humorous departure from his ongoing silent strips featuring Quimby the Mouse, before adopting him as the basis for a more sustained narrative:

Back in 1990 or so, I was doing a bunch of [comic] strips with a mouse character, which were silent strips — no words at all, and I was getting pretty tired of it. Occasionally, when I get tired of doing something, I will interject a gag strip to alleviate the tension of doing something over and over again. And I did strip that was called "Jimmy Corrigan: Smartest Kid on Earth," that was sort of a parody of a "smart kid" strip in the Depression era. Then, when I ceased doing the dumb mouse stuff, I was stuck for something to do, and I wanted to do a strip that had actually a real human being in it. And since I had done [Jimmy Corrigan], it was something I was familiar with, so I started with that.

— Ware, 2000

As Ware continued developing the character, the early "child genius" conception appeared less frequently, giving way to a more sustained focus on Corrigan's adult life and family history.

Early versions of the character appeared in the Chicago alternative weekly Newcity in December 1991, prior to the strip’s regular serialization, and differed from the later narrative developed in Jimmy Corrigan, the Smartest Kid on Earth (2000).

In addition to the graphic novel, the character of Jimmy Corrigan has appeared in other comic strips and projects by Ware in varying forms.

== Publication history ==
Jimmy Corrigan: The Smartest Kid on Earth began as a weekly comic strip in May 1992 for the Chicago-area alternative weekly Newcity. Ware produced one full tabloid-size page per week (most weeks), developing the story largely improvisationally: he did not have a fixed master plan at the outset, instead allowing recurring themes, motifs, and visual rhythms to emerge organically over roughly the first 100 pages. This slow, staccato pacing reflects his aim to evoke the rhythm of real life and to give the narrative space to unfold naturally.

The strips were later incorporated into Ware's comic book series Acme Novelty Library, issues #5–6, 8–9, and 11–14 (1995–2000), with the original weekly page format translated into two pages in both the Acme serializations and the final hardcover edition. Ware continued to experiment with layout, recurring imagery, and page design throughout this period. The 2000 hardcover edition collected and revised these materials into a continuous narrative, consolidating the serialized strips while refining visual storytelling and pacing.

== Plot summary ==
Jimmy Corrigan is a shy, socially isolated thirty-six-year-old man living alone in Chicago. He has a tightly controlled relationship with his overbearing mother and little contact with others. After receiving an unexpected phone call from his estranged father — whom he has never met — Jimmy agrees to visit him over Thanksgiving weekend in the fictional town of Waukosha, Michigan, without telling his mother.

The visit is marked by awkwardness and discomfort. Jimmy struggles to communicate, while his father, though eager to connect, frequently behaves insensitively. Jimmy meets his father's new family, including his half-sister, Amy, an African American girl with whom Jimmy forms a brief but tentative connection. The weekend consists largely of uneasy meals and outings, culminating in a minor car accident that further unsettles Jimmy. Shortly afterward, Jimmy’s father dies suddenly of a car accident, ending their brief attempt at reconciliation, and Jimmy returns to Chicago.

Interwoven throughout the contemporary narrative is an extended historical sequence set during the 1893 World's Columbian Exposition in Chicago, following Jimmy’s grandfather as a lonely child living with an abusive father. This parallel storyline traces earlier events in the Corrigan family's history and mirrors elements of Jimmy's present-day experience.

== Storytelling techniques ==
The graphic employs numerous flashbacks and parallel storylines, and its visual narrative frequently uses repeated imagery and formal variation to bind disparate segments of the narrative. Recurring visual elements in the novel include (flawed) superheroes, birds, peaches, and architectural transitions, which appear across different time periods and plot lines to connect characters and moments within the multi-generational story. Ware's storytelling also features pages with sparse or no text and intricate panel arrangements that foreground visual composition as a narrative device.

== Themes ==
Scholars have noted that Jimmy Corrigan engages with themes of identity, memory, and the construction of whiteness in American culture. Critics argue that the novel challenges the invisibility of whiteness by situating it within specific historical and familial contexts, particularly through the Corrigan family’s multigenerational narrative.

The novel also explores the instability of personal identity, portraying it as an ongoing process shaped by fragmented memories, family history, and incomplete self-knowledge. Critics have described the work as combining multiple temporal and emotional layers, using complex narrative structures to reflect memory and subjective experience.

== Autobiographical content ==
Elements of the novel appear to be autobiographical, particularly Jimmy's relationship with his father. Ware met his father only once in adulthood – while he was working on the Jimmy Corrigan project – and has remarked that his father's attempts at humor and casualness were not unlike those he'd already created for Jimmy's father in the story. The author states, however, that Jimmy Corrigan is not an account of his personal life.

== Recognition ==
Jimmy Corrigan has been lauded by critics. The New Yorker cited it as "the first formal masterpiece of (the) medium." It has received numerous awards, including:

- Ignatz Award for Outstanding Story, 2000 (for Fantagraphics comic book title)
- The Firecracker Alternative Book Award for Graphic Novel, 2001
- The American Book Award, 2001
- The Guardian First Book Award, 2001, "the first time a graphic novel has won a major UK book award," according to the Guardian.
- The Harvey Awards' Special Award for Excellence in Presentation and Best Graphic Album of Previously Published Work, 2001
- The Eisner Awards' Best Publication Design and Best Graphic Album: Reprint, 2001
- The Angoulême Festival's Prize for Best Comic Book and Prix de la critique, 2003
- In 2005, Time chose it as one of the 10 best English language, graphic novels ever written.

== Influence and comparisons ==
Several commentators, including Ware himself, have noted similarities between Jimmy Corrigan and the character Stewie Griffin from the animated television series Family Guy, which debuted after Ware's comic strip. Ware remarked that the similarities were "a little too coincidental to be simply, well, coincidental," and expressed concern that his work might be perceived as derivative.

Representatives of 20th Century Fox have maintained that Stewie is an original character. In a 2003 interview, Family Guy creator Seth MacFarlane stated that he had not been familiar with Ware’s work prior to the show’s debut, describing the similarities as "pretty shocking" and adding that he understood how Ware might draw that conclusion.
