= Tales of the Beanworld =

Comic book series by Larry Marder

- Beanish and Dreamishness on the cover to Tales of the Beanworld #9; art by Larry Marder.

Publication information
- Publisher: Beanworld Press; Eclipse Comics
- Created by: Larry Marder
Tales of the Beanworld
Publication information
- Publisher: Eclipse Comics
- Schedule: Irregular
- Format: Ongoing series
- Publication date: 1985–1993
- No. of issues: 21
Creative team
- Written by: Larry Marder
- Artist: Larry Marder

Tales of the Beanworld, also known as Larry Marder's Beanworld, is a creator-owned comic book created by Larry Marder. Beanworld features stories about the life and times of the Beans, minimalistic characters which Marder has been drawing since childhood. The stories borrow concepts from various world mythologies, popular concepts of ecology, and pop culture.

== Publication history ==
Marder initially self-published the series from 1984 before it was picked up by Eclipse Comics in 1985 – though it continued to bear Marder's own 'Beanworld Press' imprint. The series ran 21 issues until 1993, ending when Eclipse went bankrupt. A total of four book collections were released by Eclipse, reprinting issues #1–16.

With Marder's permission, lead character Beanish appeared in Eclipse's 1988-1989 crossover limited series Total Eclipse. His appearances, drawn by Marder and seeing the character interact with the likes of Miracleman and Aztec Ace, were one of the few aspects of the series to draw positive reception. It had initially been planned that he would only make a cameo appearance, but at Marder's suggestion Beanish's role was expanded. It was also one of the few Eclipse titles to acknowledge the crossover's impact, with Beanish being absent from Tales of the Beanworld #10-11 as a result.

After publishing a one-shot of new material in 2008, Dark Horse Comics republished the contents of the original series in two hardcover volumes in 2009, followed by a third hardcover volume with all new material. Marder stated that these collections completed the "Springtime" cycle of Beanworld stories. Dark Horse also published a very short volume (vol. "3.5") in 2012 that collected various short one-shot stories published over the year; the publisher also released Beanworld Volume 4: Hoka Hoka, Burb'l Burb'l! in July 2017.

== Characters ==
- Beanish: an artist bean, who creates the "Fabulous Look•See•Show", sculptures constructed from Chips, Hoops and Slats from the Four Realities for the beans to observe, interpret and appreciate.
- Mr. Spook: the Beanworld hero initially rejected by Gran’Ma’Pa, who leads the Chow Sol'jer Army and performs heroic deeds. In addition, he is the leader of the Gunk'l'Dunk Gang.
- Professor Garbanzo: an inventor/scientist bean who also functions as the Beans' primary manufacturer and supplier of tools and weapons. She is obsessed with studying Mystery Pods, particularly studying their Float Factor (levitating when Twinks are applied to them).
- Hoi-Polloi Ring Herd: inveterate gamblers, who use "chow" as money. During attacks by the Chow Sol’jer Army, the Hoi-Polloi shove their individual stores of chow into collective piles, then link arms with their neighbors in a circular formation to defend the chow. The Chow Sol'jer Army steals whatever portion of one ring herd's chow they can carry, and leave behind a "sprout-butt." The Hoi-Polloi turn the sprout-butt into more chow, which they divide among themselves. The beans take the supply of chow back to their part of the Beanworld and consume it.
- Gran’Ma’Pa: a large, mute, mostly immobile being resembling a tree which is the beans’ spiritual guardian and physical parent. Among other things, Gran'ma'pa produces sprout-butts for the beans to take on Hoi-Polloi chow raids.
- Boom’R Band: three musician beans, who play tunes for the other beans to enjoy and dance to. Music and dance are both referred to as "boom'n." In certain circumstances, their music can perform additional tasks, such as healing injured beans, and in the case of the band's rhythmist, in the curing stage of Gunk’l’dunk.
- Pod’lPool Cuties: Baby Beans.
- Chow Sol’jer Army: beans which don’t have any other specific task form the Chow Sol’jer Army, who get chow from the Hoi-Polloi. The Army is divided into two squads:
  - Spear Fling’n Flank’rs: small elite squadron who wear special masks. They attack and painfully disable the Hoi-Polloi of a ring using spears formed from a Slat and a Chip. They are assisted in this by Mr. Spook and his Trusty Fork (and its successor weapon).
  - Chow Pluk’rs: they move in after the Spear Fling’n Flank’rs have done their job, grabbing the newly abandoned chow using Pluk’r Wands formed from a Slat and a Hoop.
- Gunk’l’Dunk Gang: a small, semi-secret society within the Chow Sol’jer Army, whose function is to clean out the "gunk" from the bottom of the Chowdown Pool and process it into Gunk’l’Dunk, a useful adhesive.
- Heyoka: A shamanistic bean, who does everything backwards, stands on her head, and falls upwards. Appropriated from the Lakotah Heyoka tradition, as is the beans' characteristic cheer of "hoka-hoka-hey".
- Goofy Jerks: shiny wormlike beings from The Big•Big•Picture, with large heads, buck teeth, dark glasses, and hats (which illustrate their specific functions). Goofy Jerks usually travel in threesomes and perform specific functions stated by the second word in their name.The first ones seen in the series were the Goofy Service Jerks, which brought "Reproductive Propellant" to Gran’Ma"Pa, leading to the birth of the baby Pod’lPool Cuties. Later in the series (but earlier in the continuity, via a flashback / historical tale) were seen a customer satisfaction research team (Goofy Survey Jerks), a medical squad (Goofy Surgical Jerks), and later in both the series and in continuity, a police squad (Goofy Surveillance Jerks). Their leader and judge is the enormous Goofy Sermon Jerk.
- Dreamishness, a sun-like being (possibly the Beanworld's actual sun) with whom Beanish has daily, secret colloquies. By dancing, he finds he can prolong the ecstatic moment when she pauses directly overhead. Dreamishness can't stand the Goofy Jerks, who refer to her as a "hot babe".

== Locations ==
- Chowdown Pool: a large, communal facility which the Beans use for 'eating'. They mix chow taken from the Hoi-Polloi Ring Herd with water from the Thin Lake to produce 'soup'. The Bean community then enters the Pool and takes in nutrients through osmosis.
- Legendary Edge: traditional exit point from the Beanworld, used when Beans wish to explore the Four Realities or hunt for chow.
- Proverbial Sandy Beach: traditional re-entry point onto the Beanworld.
- Thin Lake: relatively shallow but apparently endless layer of water that rests on top of the Four Realities.
- Four Realities: strata of objects from which the Beans make virtually all of their possessions and structures. They are, in descending order, Slats (essentially lumber of various sizes), Hoops (exactly that), Twinks (five-pointed stars), and Chips (flat, triangular solids).
- Bone Zone: During the first published Beanworld story, a processing ship invaded the Beanworld, containing four-armed corn kernels who were led by 'The Mirthful Mossy Mammoth and his Little Clone Son'. A significant number of Hoi-Polloi Ring Herd were murdered and 'processed' into 'Mossy Mammoth Luncheon Meats: Boiled in Butter!', leaving only their skulls. These skulls all collected in a stable 'level' below the Four Realities, although the Beans do not refer to this as an additional Reality. This level also established an additional distance for the Chow Sol'jer Army to travel in order to reach the Hoi-Polloi Ring Herd and the chow.
- Der Stinkle: the lowest level of the Beanworld, literally beneath the notice of both the Beans and the Hoi-Polloi Ring Herd. Apparently analogous to compressed soil that is not quite as hard as sedimentary rock, as the inhabitants have created a vast network of tunnels through it. The author states on his blog that he meant Der Stinkle as a form of Xibalba. Der Stinkle is presumably uninhabited, as the insects (and their leader, Der Kveen) all abandoned it in search of the beans' surplus of 'mountain-grown chow'. Having eaten all the chow, Der Kveen laid thousands of "aigs", which the beans know as "mystery pods" and use for a variety of purposes.
- The Big•Big•Picture: the greater universe of which the Beanworld is one small part. Mentioned briefly by the Goofy Service Jerks, and was partially explored by Heyoka in the final issue of the first run.

== Reception ==
Amazing Heroes review R.A. Jones was not a fan of the title when reviewing the first issue, but praised Marder's commitment to his vision. The series was nominated for 'Best Black-and-White' at the 1987 Kirby Awards, but lost out to Cerebus. Phil Foglio and Scott McCloud were among those to praise the series.

== Bibliography ==
- Tales of The Beanworld #1-#21 (Eclipse Comics)
  - Larry Marder's Beanworld Book 1 (Collects #1–4)
  - Larry Marder's Beanworld Book 2 (Collects #5–7)
  - Larry Marder's Beanworld Book 3 (Collects #8–11)
  - Larry Marder's Beanworld Book 4 (Collects #12–16)
- Larry Marder's Beanworld Book 1, Dark Horse Books, Collects #1-9
- Larry Marder's Beanworld Book 2, Dark Horse Books, Collects #10-21
- Larry Marder's Beanworld Book 3, Dark Horse Books, all new material
- Larry Marder's Beanworld Book 3.5, Dark Horse Books, Collects stories from Asylum 1-4, Larry Marder's Beanworld Holiday Special, MySpace Dark Horse Presents #14
- Larry Marder's Beanworld Book 4, Dark Horse Books, all new material
- Larry Marder's Beanworld Omnibus 1, Dark Horse Books, Collects Books 1,2
- Larry Marder's Beanworld Omnibus 2, Dark Horse Books, Collects Books 3,3.5,4
