= Edie Fake =

American artist and author (born 1980)

- Born: 1980 (age 45–46); Evanston, Illinois, U.S.
- Education: University of Southern California; Rhode Island School of Design
- Known for: Fine art, comics, illustration, author, transgender activist
- Movement: Decorative art, queer art

Edie Fake (born 1980) is an American artist, illustrator, author, and transgender activist. Fake is known for their comics/zines, gouache and ink paintings, and murals. Fake has an award winning comic-zine series about Gaylord Phoenix, a bird-like man that travels to different environments and has various lovers. He is currently based in Joshua Tree, California, after previously residing in Chicago and Los Angeles.

== Early life and education ==
Fake was born in 1980 and raised in Evanston, Illinois. In 2002, he received a B.F.A. degree in Film, Animation and Video (FAV) from Rhode Island School of Design (RISD). After graduating from RISD, Fake worked as a negative cutter for approximately 6 years, and started working in comics, collage and drawing, and translating their animation into two dimensional work because it was more accessible.

In 2015, Fake had been enrolled at Roski School of Art at University of Southern California (USC) and was one of the seven artists (nicknamed the "USC7") that dropped out of the school in protest of the mistreatment by the administration.

== Work ==
Fake’s work uses visual abstraction as an exploration of identity in the transgender and queer experience. The Gaylord Phoenix short comics series started in 2002. In the illustrated book, Gaylord Phoenix (2010) there is expression of desire and transformation happening to a bird-like man in a dream-like, fantasy environment.

In the illustrated book, Memory Palaces (2014), Fake reimagines the facades of historical queer spaces in Chicago in abstract, fantasy-like paintings of architecture, which are used as a metaphor for the transgender body. Both with architecture and the human body, these exist as structures and present decorative and protective features, and both of these are vulnerable due to shifts in U.S. politics and social change. Additionally in the exhibition of the same name, Memory Palaces (2013), at Thomas Robertello Gallery in Chicago, there were a series of drawings titled "Gateway", where Fake pays tribute the death of his five artist friends, Mark Aguhar, Nick Djandji, Dara Greenwald, Flo McGarrell, and Dylan Williams.

Fake won the 2011 Ignatz Award for "Outstanding Graphic Novel" for Gaylord Phoenix. In 2019, Fake was one of the guests of honors at MoCCA Festival by the Society of Illustrators.

== Exhibitions ==
This is a list of select exhibitions of Edie Fake's work, separated by the type of exhibition and listed by year of exhibition.

=== Solo exhibitions ===
- 2019–2020 – Affordable Housing for Trans Elders, solo art wall/mural, Berkeley Art Museum and Pacific Film Archive (BAMPFA), Berkeley, California
- 2019–2020 – Edie Fake: Labyrinth, Drawing Center, New York City, New York
- 2018 – Edie Fake: Structure Shifts, Everson Museum, Syracuse, New York
- 2016 – Edie Fake, Marlborough Chelsea, New York City, New York
- 2013 – Memory Palaces, solo exhibition, Thomas Robertello Gallery, Chicago, Illinois

=== Group exhibitions ===
- 2019 – Queer Forms, Katherine E. Nash Gallery, University of Minnesota, Minneapolis, Minnesota
- 2019 – Queer Abstraction, Des Moines Art Center, Des Moines, Iowa
- 2019 – Queer California: Untold Stories, Oakland Museum of California (OMCA), Oakland, California
- 2018 – Surface/Depth: The Decorative After Miriam Schapiro, Museum of Arts and Design (MAD), New York City, New York
- 2018 – Declaration, Institute for Contemporary Art (ICA), Virginia Commonwealth University (VCU), Richmond, Virginia
- 2017 – A Dazzling Decade: Works Acquired Over the Past 10 Years, Nerman Museum of Contemporary Art (NMOCA), Johnson County Community College, Overland Park, Kansas
- 2016 – Tomorrow Never Happens, Samek Gallery, Bucknell University, Lewisburg, Pennsylvania

== Publications ==
- Fake, Edie (2010). Gaylord Phoenix. Brooklyn, New York: Secret Acres. ISBN 9780979960987.
- Fake, Edie (2014). Memory Palaces. Brooklyn, New York: Secret Acres. ISBN 9780988814936.
- Fake, Edie (2018). Little Stranger. Brooklyn, New York: Secret Acres. ISBN 9780999193501.
