= Chris Ware =

American artist (born 1967)

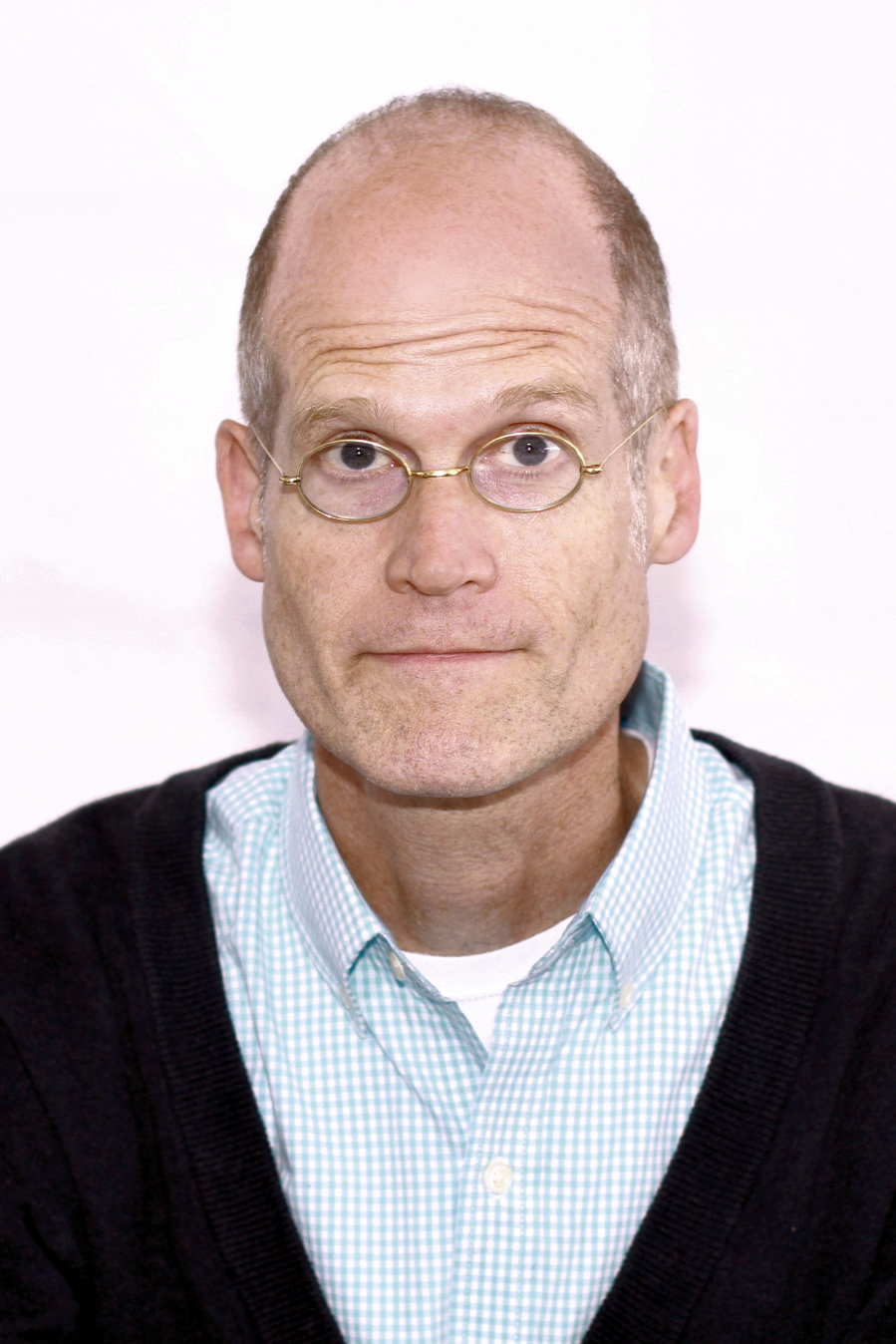
- Ware at the 2019 Texas Book Festival
- Born: Franklin Christenson Ware; December 28, 1967 (age 58) Omaha, Nebraska, U.S.
- Area: Cartoonist
- Notable works: Acme Novelty Library; Jimmy Corrigan; Building Stories; Monograph
- Awards: Eisner Award: 1995, 1996, 1997, 1998, 2000, 2001, 2002, 2006, 2008, 2009, 2013; Harvey Award: 1995, 1996, 1997, 1998, 2000, 2001, 2002, 2004, 2006, 2013; National Cartoonists Society Award: 1999, 2013; Guardian First Book Award: 2001; United States Artists Fellowship: 2006

Franklin Christenson Ware (born December 28, 1967) is an American cartoonist known for his Acme Novelty Library series (begun in 1994) and the graphic novels Jimmy Corrigan, the Smartest Kid on Earth (2000), Building Stories (2012) and Rusty Brown (2019). His works explore themes of social isolation, emotional torment and depression. He tends to use a vivid color palette and realistic, meticulous detail. His lettering and images are often elaborate and sometimes evoke the ragtime era or another early 20th-century American design style.

Ware often refers to himself in the publicity for his work in self-effacing, even withering tones. He is considered by some critics and fellow notable illustrators and writers, such as Dave Eggers, to be among the best currently working in the medium; Canadian graphic-novelist Seth has said: "Chris really changed the playing field. After him, a lot of [cartoonists] really started to scramble and go, 'Holy [expletive], I think I have to try harder.'"

== Early life and education ==
Chris Ware was born in Omaha, Nebraska, in 1967. His parents separated shortly after his birth, and he was raised by his mother, who worked at the Omaha World-Herald. Because of her work schedule, Ware spent significant time with his grandparents and became especially close to his grandmother, whose storytelling he has cited as an important early influence.

Ware has cited American newspaper comic strips as a source of inspiration, particularly early cartoonists such as Winsor McCay and George Herriman, as well as later figures including Frank King and Charles M. Schulz.

Ware attended the University of Texas at Austin, studying painting and printmaking, and earned his BFA in 1991. Shortly after graduation, he moved to Chicago to attend a graduate program in printmaking at the School of the Art Institute of Chicago (1991–1993), which he did not complete.

== Career ==
Ware's earliest published strips appeared in the late 1980s on the comics page of The Daily Texan, the student newspaper of the University of Texas at Austin. In addition to numerous daily strips under different titles, Ware also had a weekly satirical science fiction serial in the paper titled Floyd Farland - Citizen of the Future. This was eventually published in 1988 as a prestige format comic book from Eclipse Comics, and its publication even led to a brief correspondence between Ware and Timothy Leary.

While still a sophomore at UT, Ware came to the attention of Art Spiegelman, who invited Ware to contribute to Raw, the influential anthology magazine Spiegelman was co-editing with Françoise Mouly. Ware has acknowledged that being included in Raw gave him confidence and inspired him to explore printing techniques and self-publishing. His Fantagraphics series Acme Novelty Library defied comics publishing conventions with every issue. The series featured a combination of new material as well as reprints of work Ware had done for the Texan (such as Quimby the Mouse) and the Chicago alternative weekly Newcity. Ware's work appeared originally in Newcity before he moved on to the Chicago Reader. Beginning with the 16th issue of Acme Novelty Library," Ware began self-publishing his work while maintaining a relationship with Fantagraphics for distribution and storage. This was a return to Ware's early career, self-publishing such books as Lonely Comics and Stories as well as miniature digests of stories based on Quimby the Mouse and an unnamed potato-like creature.

Ware's first graphic novel, Jimmy Corrigan: The Smartest Kid on Earth, published by Pantheon Books in 2000, originated as a weekly strip for Newcity beginning in May 1992, with Ware producing one full tabloid-size page per week and developing the story largely improvisationally, before the material was later serialized in Acme Novelty Library and ultimately revised and collected into the 2000 hardcover edition.

Ware has also been involved in editing (and designing) several books and book series, including the new reprint series of Gasoline Alley from Drawn & Quarterly, titled Walt and Skeezix; a reprint series of Krazy Kat by Fantagraphics; and the 13th volume of Timothy McSweeney's Quarterly Concern, which is devoted to comics. He was the editor of The Best American Comics 2007, the second installment devoted to comics in the Best American series.

In 2007, Ware curated an exhibition, titled UnInked: Paintings, Sculpture and Graphic Works by Five Cartoonists, for the Phoenix Art Museum focused on the non-comic work of five contemporary cartoonists. Ware also edited and designed the catalog for the exhibition.

In 2017, Ware's book Monograph was published. It is a part-memoir, part-scrapbook retrospective of his career to that point. The New York Review of Books described it as "a grand tomb in the Egyptian mold, whose contents will tell anyone who breaks into it what this person’s life was like", adding that "it seems almost an invasion of privacy to enter this crypt."

== Style ==
Ware's art reflects early 20th-century American styles of cartooning and graphic design, shifting through formats from traditional comic panels to faux advertisements and cut-out toys. Stylistic influences include advertising graphics from that same era; newspaper strip cartoonists Winsor McCay (Little Nemo in Slumberland) and Frank King (Gasoline Alley); Charles Schulz's post-WWII strip Peanuts and the cover designs of ragtime-era sheet music. Ware has spoken about finding inspiration in the work of artist Joseph Cornell and cites Richard McGuire's strip Here as a major influence on his use of non-linear narratives. Ware has said of his own style:

"I arrived at my way of 'working' as a way of visually approximating what I feel the tone of fiction to be in prose versus the tone one might use to write biography; I would never do a biographical story using the deliberately synthetic way of cartooning I use to write fiction. I try to use the rules of typography to govern the way that I 'draw', which keeps me at a sensible distance from the story as well as being a visual analog to the way we remember and conceptualize the world. I figured out this way of working by learning from and looking at artists I admired and whom I thought came closest to getting at what seemed to me to be the 'essence' of comics, which is fundamentally the weird process of reading pictures, not just looking at them. I see the black outlines of cartoons as visual approximations of the way we remember general ideas, and I try to use naturalistic color underneath them to simultaneously suggest a perceptual experience, which I think is more or less the way we actually experience the world as adults; we don't really 'see' anymore after a certain age, we spend our time naming and categorizing and identifying and figuring how everything all fits together. Unfortunately, as a result, I guess sometimes readers get a chilled or antiseptic sensation from it, which is certainly not intentional, and is something I admit as a failure, but is also something I can't completely change at the moment."

Although his precise, geometrical layouts may appear to some to be computer-generated, Ware works almost exclusively with manual drawing tools such as paper and ink, rulers and T-squares. He does, however, sometimes use photocopies and transparencies, and he employs a computer to color his strips.

== Recurring characters and stories ==
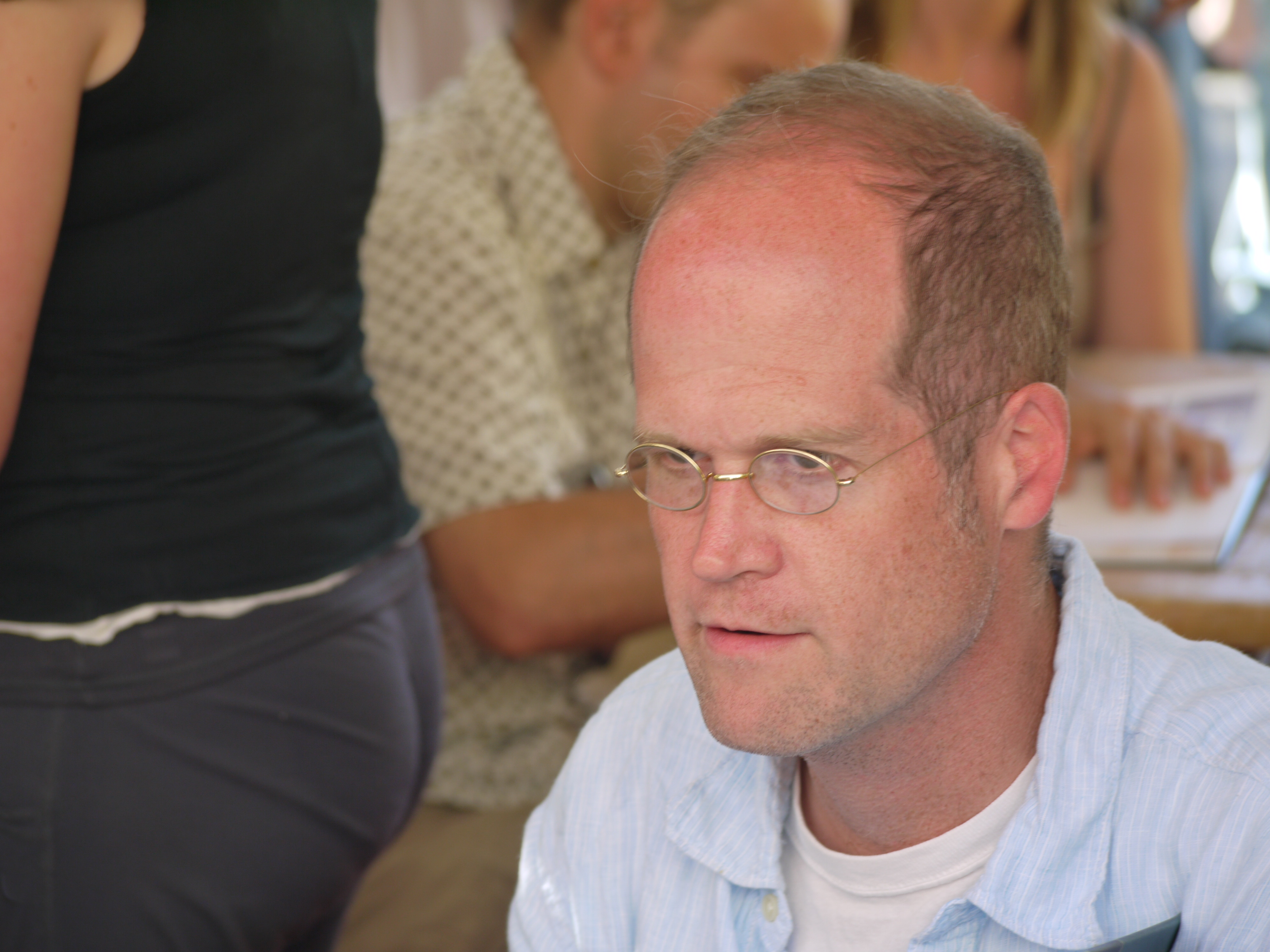
Ware in 2009

=== Quimby the Mouse ===
Quimby the Mouse was one of Ware's earliest recurring characters and an important early breakthrough. Rendered in a style reminiscent of early animation and newspaper comics, the largely wordless Quimby strips marked an early turn toward autobiographical themes and formal experimentation in Ware’s work. The character appeared throughout the early 1990s in periodicals and later in Acme Novelty Library, before being collected in the hardcover Quimby the Mouse (Fantagraphics, 2003).

=== Jimmy Corrigan ===
Jimmy Corrigan is one of Ware's most frequently recurring characters, appearing across multiple comic strips and projects in varying forms. The character originated c. 1990, in Ware's early gag strips as a parody of Depression-era "child genius" comics, sometimes depicted as an imaginary prodigy. Over time, Ware gradually deemphasized this version of the character, instead reimagining Corrigan as a socially isolated adult whose life and family history became the focus of later narratives. This evolution culminated in the graphic novel Jimmy Corrigan, the Smartest Kid on Earth (Pantheon, 2000).

Alternate versions of the character — for example, the anonymous male figures in Ware's Tales of Tomorrow strips — closely resemble Jimmy Corrigan in both appearance and temperament, continued to appear intermittently in Ware's serialized work.

=== God / Super-Man ===
Ware’s work features a recurring godlike figure, often referred to as "God" or "Super-Man" (distinct from the DC Comics superhero), appearing in various strips, including Acme Novelty Library and Jimmy Corrigan: The Smartest Kid on Earth. The character, typically depicted as pudgy, middle-aged, and masked, subverts conventional heroic morality: he walks among mortals yet cannot or will not intervene to save anyone, embodying a "simple, cruel premise" that aligns with Ware’s interest in moral indifference and bleak humor. In Jimmy Corrigan, he appears both as an omnipotent presence and as a Superman-costumed figure who leaps to his death, functioning as a "failed God-character" and a critique of the absence of moral rescue or redemptive power in the narrative.

=== Rusty Brown ===
Ware's Rusty Brown is an ongoing, multi-part narrative centered on a group of interconnected characters associated with a private school in Omaha, Nebraska, with storylines spanning from childhood into adulthood. Although named for its title character — a socially isolated boy with a fixation on collecting pop-cultural memorabilia — the work expands to follow a wider cast, including his father W.K. "Woody" Brown, his classmate Chalky White, the teacher Joanne Cole, and the bully Jordan Lint, each of whom is the focus of extended narrative sections. Ware began developing the project in the late 1990s and expanded it in the early 2000s following the completion of Jimmy Corrigan, the Smartest Kid on Earth. The first part of Rusty Brown was published in book form in 2019 by Pantheon Books.

=== Building Stories ===
Ware's Building Stories was serialized in a host of different venues. It first appeared as a monthly strip in Nest Magazine. Instalments later appeared in a number of publications, including The New Yorker, Kramer's Ergot, and most notably, the Sunday New York Times Magazine. Building Stories appeared weekly in the New York Times Magazine from September 18, 2005, until April 16, 2006. A full chapter was published in Acme Novelty Library, number 18. Another instalment was published under the title "Touch Sensitive" as a digital app released through McSweeney's. The entire narrative was published as a boxed set of books by Pantheon in October 2012. The boxed set holds 14 different works, in various sizes and forms, weaving through the life of an unnamed brown haired woman.

=== The Last Saturday ===
The Last Saturday is a graphic novella by Ware that was serialized in weekly installments on the website of the British newspaper The Guardian in 2014–2015. (The strip was also featured in the newspaper's Weekend magazine.) The story follows a few people in the fictional Midwestern town of Sandy Port, Michigan: Putnam Gray, a young boy caught up in science fiction fantasies; Sandy Grains, a classmate who is interested in Putnam; Rosie Gentry, a classmate with whom Putnam is infatuated; Putnam's parents; and Sandy's mother. Exploring typical Ware themes of imagination and social isolation, the series ran for 54 installments before concluding in 2015 with the note, "End, Part One." Scholars have discussed the work as an example of digital comics that retain the page-based design of print graphic novels, reflecting Ware’s emphasis on complex page layouts and visual structure. As of the mid-2020s, The Last Saturday had not been collected in book form, though excerpts appeared in The Best American Comics 2016.

== Design, illustration, and other projects ==
=== Music and ragtime-related design ===
Ware is an ardent collector of ragtime paraphernalia and occasionally publishes a journal devoted to the music titled The Ragtime Ephemeralist.He also plays the banjo and piano. The influence of ragtime music and early twentieth-century graphic design is evident in his use of logos, typography, and layout.

Ware has designed album covers and promotional materials for ragtime performers, including the Et Cetera String Band, Virginia Tichenor, Reginald R. Robinson, the Paragon Ragtime Orchestra, and Guido Nielsen. Ware has also produced cover artwork for non-ragtime performers such as Andrew Bird's Bowl of Fire and Five Style.

=== Book and literary design ===
In 1997, Ware was commissioned by Chip Kidd to design the interior mechanical illustration for the bird featured on the cover of Haruki Murakami's novel The Wind-Up Bird Chronicle. He also designed the cover for Penguin Books' edition of Voltaire's Candide.

=== Film, television, and performance collaborations ===
In 2003–04, Ware collaborated with Ira Glass and Chicago historian Tim Samuelson on Lost Buildings, a multimedia project about architectural preservation in Chicago, particularly the work of Louis Sullivan. Originally produced for a live stage show in 2003, the project was later released as a book and DVD.

Ware produced animated segments for the television adaptation of This American Life on Showtime and contributed to the program as a color consultant. He has also created poster art for films including Tamara Jenkins’ The Savages (2007) and Private Life (2018), and the U.S. release of Apichatpong Weerasethakul’s Uncle Boonmee Who Can Recall His Past Lives (2011).

=== Public art and civic design ===
Dave Eggers commissioned Ware to design a mural for the facade of San Francisco literacy organization 826 Valencia. The mural depicts the parallel development of human communication and was applied by artisans to Ware’s specifications.

In 2025, Ware designed a panel of Forever stamps for the 250th anniversary of the United States Postal Service. The interconnected stamps depict a seasonal bird's-eye view of a bustling American city.

=== Commissioned but unused work ===
In 2010, Ware designed a satirical cover for Fortune magazine’s “Fortune 500” issue; although commissioned, the cover was ultimately not used.

== Awards and honors ==
Over the years, his work garnered several awards, including the 1999 National Cartoonists Society's Award for Best Comic Book for Acme Novelty Library and Award for Graphic Novel for Building Stories.

Ware has won numerous Eisner Awards during his career including Best Writer/Artist in 2009 (Acme Novelty Library) and 2013 (Building Stories); Best Writer/Artist-Drama in 2008; Best Continuing Series in 1996 and 2000 (Acme Novelty Library); Best Graphic Album: New in 2000 and 2013 (Building Stories); Best Graphic Album: Reprint in 2001 (Jimmy Corrigan); Best Colorist of 1996, 1998, 2001 and 2006; Best Publication Design in 1995, 1996, 1997 (Acme Novelty Library), 2001 (Jimmy Corrigan), 2002, 2006 (Acme Novelty Library Annual Report for Shareholders) and 2013 (Building Stories)

Ware has won multiple Harvey Awards including Best Continuing or Limited Series in 2000 and 2001; Best Cartoonist in 2006 (Acme Novelty Library); Best Letterer in 1996, 2000, 2002, and 2006; Best Colorist in 1996, 1997, 1998, 2000, 2002 and 2004 (Acme Novelty Datebook); and Special Award for Excellence in Presentation in 1996, 1997, 1998, 1999, 2000 (Acme Novelty Library), 2001 (Jimmy Corrigan), 2004 (Acme Novelty Datebook) and 2013 (Building Stories)

In 2002, Ware became the first comics artist to be invited to exhibit at Whitney Museum of American Art biennial exhibition. With Will Eisner, Jack Kirby, Harvey Kurtzman, Robert Crumb and Gary Panter, Ware was among the artists honored in the exhibition Masters of American Comics at the Jewish Museum in New York City, New York, from September 16, 2006 to January 28, 2007. His work was the subject of solo exhibitions at the Museum of Contemporary Art, Chicago in 2006 and at the University of Nebraska–Lincoln's Sheldon Museum of Art, in 2007.

Ware's graphic novel Jimmy Corrigan, the Smartest Kid on Earth won the 2001 Guardian First Book Award, the first time a graphic novel has won a major United Kingdom book award. It also won the 2001 Firecracker Alternative Book Award for Outstanding Graphic Novel. And it won the prize for best album at the 2003 Angoulême International Comics Festival in France.

In 2006, Ware received a USA Fellowship grant from United States Artists.

In 2013, Ware received the 2013 Lynd Ward Graphic Novel Prize for Building Stories and was finalist for Jan Michalski Prize for Literature and Los Angeles Times Book Prize.

In 2020, Ware's Rusty Brown was nominated for the PEN/Jean Stein Book Award.

In 2021, he was awarded the Grand Prix de la ville d'Angoulême for his lifelong achievement.

== Personal life ==
Ware lives in the Chicago suburb of Oak Park with his wife and their daughter.

== Bibliography ==
- Jimmy Corrigan: The Smartest Kid on Earth. Pantheon. 2000. ISBN 0224062107.
- Quimby the Mouse. Fantagraphics Books. 2003. ISBN 1560974559.
- The Acme Novelty Library. New York: Pantheon. 2005. ISBN 9780375422959.
- Acme Novelty Datebook. Drawn & Quarterly. 2007. ISBN 9781897299180.
- Building Stories. Pantheon Books. 2012. ISBN 9780224078122.
- The Acme Novelty Datebook: Sketches and Diary Pages in Facsimile. Drawn & Quarterly. 2013. ISBN 978-1896597669
- Monograph. New York: Rizzoli. 2017. ISBN 9780847860883.
- Rusty Brown, Part I. New York: Pantheon. 2019. ISBN 9780375424328.

== Sources ==
- Arnold, Andrew (November 27, 2001). "The Depressing Joy of Chris Ware". Time. Archived from the original on December 17, 2007.
- Ball, David M.; Kuhlman, Martha B., eds. (2010). The Comics of Chris Ware: Drawing Is a Way of Thinking. University Press of Mississippi. ISBN 978-1-60473-443-0.
- Edemariam, Aida (October 31, 2005). "The Art of Melancholy". The Guardian.
- Onstad, Chris (January 11, 2008). "Visual Tribute to Chris War". Achewood.
- Peters, Tim (Spring 2011). "Chris Ware's ANL #20". The Point. Archived from the original on April 30, 2011.
- Raeburn, Daniel (July 4, 1999). "The Smartest Cartoonist on Earth" (PDF). The Imp. Archived from the original (PDF) on September 18, 2010.
- Raeburn, Daniel (2004). Chris Ware. Monographics Series. Yale University Press. ISBN 978-0-300-10291-8.
- Schjeldahl, Peter (October 17, 2005). "Words and Pictures: Graphic novels come of age". The New Yorker.
- Wolk, Douglas (September 2, 2005). "The inimitable Chris Ware". Salon.com. Archived from the original on June 6, 2008.
- Wondrich, David (January 21, 2001). "Ragtime: No Longer a Novelty in Sepia". The New York Times.
