= Aaron Renier =

American comics artist

- Born: Green Bay, Wisconsin
- Occupation: Comics artist
- Writing career
- Notable awards: Eisner Award (2006)
- Website: aaronrenier.com

Aaron Renier is an American comics artist and author.

== Biography ==
Renier was born in Green Bay, Wisconsin. Between 2000 and 2009, he lived in Portland, Oregon and Brooklyn, New York before settling in West Town, Chicago.

In 2010, Renier received the inaugural Sendak Fellowship.

His graphic novel Spiral-Bound was published by Top Shelf Productions in September 2005 and won him the 2006 Eisner award for "Talent Deserving of Wider Recognition." In 2008, he began providing illustrations for the book series The Knights' Tales written by Gerald Morris. He also Alice Shertle's 2009 picture book An Anaconda Ate My Homework. He has also created The Unsinkable Walker Bean and illustrated Charlotte Perkins Gilman's The Yellow Wallpaper. He sometimes collaborates with colorist Alec Longstreth.

== Awards and honors ==
Awards for Renier's books
Year	Title	Award	Result	Ref.
2010	The Unsinkable Walker Bean	Cybils Award for Elementary and Middle Grade Graphic Novel	Finalist	
2009	Spiral-Bound: Top Secret Summer	Eisner Award for Talent Deserving of Wider Recognition	Winner	

== Publications ==
=== As author ===
- Spiral-Bound: Top Secret Summer (2005)
- Papercutter, with J.P. Coovert and Sean Aaberg * Papercutter, with (2006) (2006)
- Through the Hall of Biodiversity (2008)
- The Unsinkable Walker Bean (2010)
- Anywhere At Once, illustrated by Laura Park (2011)
- The Unsinkable Walker Bean and the Knights of the Waxing Moon (2018)

=== As illustrator ===
- The Lifters, written by Dave Eggers (2018)
