= Doug Wright Award for Best Book =

Canadian literary award for comics

- Awarded for: Excellence in graphic novels and comics
- Country: Canada
- First award: 2005

The Doug Wright Award for Best Book is a Canadian literary award for comics and graphic novels. It is a part of the Doug Wright Awards, and has been given out annually since 2005. It is named after the late Canadian cartoonist Doug Wright.

== Doug Wright Award for Best Book ==
Year	Title	Author	Publisher	Result	Reference
2026	Cannon	Lee Lai	Drawn & Quarterly	Winner	
2026	Holy Lacrimony	Michael DeForge	Drawn & Quarterly	Finalist	
2026	Muybridge	Guy Delisle	Drawn & Quarterly	Finalist	
2026	Salt Green Death	Katarina Thorsen	Conundrum Press	Finalist	
2026	The Last Band on Earth	Elaine M. Will	Renegade Arts Entertainment	Finalist	
2025	I'm So Glad We Had This Time Together	Maurice Vellekoop	Random House Canada	Winner	
2025	Age 16	Rosena Fung	Annick Press	Finalist	
2025	Bog Myrtle	Sid Sharp	Annick Press	Finalist	
2025	The Field	Dave Lapp	Conundrum Press	Finalist	
2025	The Jellyfish	Boum, translated by Robin Lang and Helge Dascher	Pow Pow Press	Finalist	
2025	The Wendy Award	Walter Scott	Drawn & Quarterly	Finalist	
2024	A Guest in the House	E. M. Carroll	First Second	Winner	
2024	Val-d’Or Neon	Olivier Ballou	Self-published	Finalist	
2024	Harvey Knight's Odyssey	Nick Maandag	Drawn & Quarterly	Finalist	
2024	Naked: The Confessions of a Normal Woman by	Éloïse Marseille	Pow Pow Press	Finalist	
2024	Roaming	Jillian Tamaki and Mariko Tamaki	Drawn & Quarterly	Finalist	
2024	JAJ	Michael Nicoll Yahgulanaas	Drawn & Quarterly	Finalist	
2023	Ducks: Two Years in the Oil Sands	Kate Beaton	Drawn & Quarterly	Winner	
2023	Time Zone J	Julie Doucet	Drawn & Quarterly	Finalist	
2023	Shelterbelts	Jonathan Dyck	Conundrum Press	Finalist	
2023	The Flamingo	Guojing	Random House Studio	Finalist	
2023	Kwändür	Cole Pauls	Conundrum Press	Finalist	
2023	You Know, Sex	Cory Silverberg and Fiona Smyth	Triangle Square	Finalist	
2022	The Shiatsung Project	Brigitte Archambault	Conundrum Press	Winner	
2022	Cyclopedia Exotica	Aminder Dhaliwal	Drawn & Quarterly	Finalist	
2022	The Rock From the Sky	Jon Klassen	Candlewick Press	Finalist	
2022	Stone Fruit	Lee Lai	Fantagraphics	Finalist	
2022	Fictional Father	Joe Ollmann	Drawn & Quarterly	Finalist	
2021	Lonely Boys	S. Bédard	Pow Pow Press	Winner	
2021	Familiar Face	Michael DeForge	Drawn & Quarterly	Finalist	
2021	Constantly	GG	Koyama Press	Finalist	
2021	Paul at Home	Michel Rabagliati	Drawn & Quarterly	Finalist	
2021	Wendy, Master	Walter Scott	Drawn & Quarterly	Finalist	
2020	Bezimena	Nina Bunjevac	Fantagraphics Books	Winner	
2020	This Place: 150 Years Retold	Kateri Akiwenzie-Damm, Sonny Assu, Brandon Mitchell, Rachel and Sean Qitsualik-Tinsley, David A. Robertson, Niigaanwewidam James Sinclair, Jen Storm, Richard Van Camp, Katherena Vermette, Chelsea Vowel, Tara Audibert, Kyle Charles, GMB Chomichuk, Natasha Donovan, Scott A. Ford, Scott B. Henderson, Ryan Howe, Andrew Lodwick, Jen Storm, Donovan Yaciuk, Alicia Elliott	HighWater Press	Finalist	
2020	The Cursed Hermit	Kris Bertin, Alexander Forbes	Conundrum Press	Finalist	
2020	Agnes, Murderess	Sarah Leavitt	Freehand Books	Finalist	
2020	Death Threat	Vivek Shraya, Ness Lee	Arsenal Pulp Press	Finalist	
2020	Bradley of Him	Connor Willumsen	Koyama Press	Finalist	
2019	Young Frances	Hartley Lin	Adhouse Books	Winner	
2019	A Western World	Michael DeForge	Koyama Press	Finalist	
2019	Evie and the Truth About Witches	John Martz	Koyama Press	Finalist	
2019	Somnambulance	Fiona Smyth	Koyama Press	Finalist	
2018	Crawl Space	Jesse Jacobs	Koyama Press	Winner	
2018	Hostage	Guy Delisle	Drawn & Quarterly	Finalist	
2018	I'm Not Here	GG	Koyama Press	Finalist	
2018	The Abominable Mr. Seabrook	Joe Ollmann	Drawn & Quarterly	Finalist	
2018	Anti-Gone	Connor Willumsen	Koyama Press	Finalist	
2017	Bird in a Cage	Rebecca Roher	Conundrum Press	Winner	
2017	Mary Wept Over the Feet of Jesus	Chester Brown	Drawn & Quarterly	Finalist	
2017	Big Kids	Michael DeForge	Drawn & Quarterly	Finalist	
2017	Burt's Way Home	John Martz	Koyama Press	Finalist	
2017	The Envelope Manufacturer	Chris Oliveros		Finalist	
2016	Dressing	Michael DeForge	Koyama Press	Winner	
2016	Melody	Sylvie Rancourt	Drawn & Quarterly	Finalist	
2016	Palookaville #22	Seth	Drawn & Quarterly	Finalist	
2016	Step Aside, Pops	Kate Beaton	Drawn & Quarterly	Finalist	
2016	Stroppy	Marc Bell	Drawn & Quarterly	Finalist	
2016	SuperMutant Magic Academy	Jillian Tamaki	Drawn & Quarterly	Finalist	
2015	Fatherland	Nina Bunjevac	Jonathan Cape/Random House	Winner	
2015	Ant Colony	Michael DeForge	Drawn & Quarterly	Finalist	
2015	Safari Honeymoon	Jesse Jacobs	Koyama Press	Finalist	
2015	The People Inside	Ray Fawkes	Oni Press	Finalist	
2015	This One Summer	Jillian Tamaki and Mariko Tamaki	Groundwood	Finalist	
2014	Paul Joins the Scouts	Michel Rabagliati		Winner	
2014	Palookaville #21	Seth	Drawn & Quarterly	Finalist	
2014	Science Fiction	Joe Ollmann	Conundrum Press	Finalist	
2014	Susceptible	Geneviève Castrée	Drawn & Quarterly	Finalist	
2014	Very Casual	Michael DeForge	Koyama Press	Finalist	
2013	The Song of Roland	Michel Rabagliati	Conundrum Press	Winner	
2013	Lose #4	Michael DeForge	Koyama Press	Finalist	
2013	By This Shall You Know Him	Jesse Jacobs	Koyama Press	Finalist	
2013	Pope Hats #3	Ethan Rilly	AdHouse Books	Finalist	
2013	Wax Cross	Tin Can Forest	Koyama Press	Finalist	
2012	Hark! A Vagran	Kate Beaton	Drawn & Quarterly	Winner	
2012	Lose #3	Michael DeForge	Koyama Press	Finalist	
2012	Mid-Life	Joe Ollmann	Conundrum Press	Finalist	
2012	Paying for It	Chester Brown	Drawn & Quarterly	Finalist	
2012	Reunion	Pascal Girard	Drawn & Quarterly	Finalist	
2012	The Great Northern Brotherhood of Canadian Cartoonists	Seth	Drawn & Quarterly	Finalist	
2011	Bigfoot	Pascal Girard	Drawn & Quarterly	Winner	
2011	Chimo	David Collier	Conundrum Press	Finalist	
2011	Lose #2	Michael DeForge	Koyama Press	Finalist	
2011	Moving Pictures	Kathryn Immonen and Stuart Immonen	Top Shelf Productions	Finalist	
2011	Streakers	Nick Maandag		Finalist	
2010	George Sprott: (1894–1975)	Seth	Drawn & Quarterly	Winner	
2010	Back + Forth	Marta Chudolinska	Porcupine's Quill	Finalist	
2010	Hot Potatoe	Marc Bell	Drawn & Quarterly	Finalist	
2010	Kaspar	Diane Obomsawin	Drawn & Quarterly	Finalist	
2010	Red: A Haida Manga	Michael Nicoll Yahgulanaas	Drawn & Quarterly	Finalist	
2009	Skim	Jillian Tamaki and Mariko Tamaki	Groundwood	Winner	
2009	Burma Chronicles	Guy Delisle	Drawn & Quarterly	Finalist	
2009	Drop-in	Dave Lapp		Finalist	
2009	Paul Goes Fishing	Michel Rabagliati	Drawn & Quarterly	Finalist	
2008	The Magical Life of Long Tack Sam	Ann Marie Fleming	Riverhead Books	Winner	
2008	365 Days: A Diary	Julie Doucet	Drawn & Quarterly	Finalist	
2008	Spent	Joe Matt	Drawn & Quarterly	Finalist	
2008	Southern Cross	Laurence Hyde	Drawn & Quarterly	Finalist	
2007	This Will All End in Tears	Joe Ollmann	Insomniac Press	Winner	
2007	Shenzhen: A Travelogue From China	Guy Delisle	Drawn and Quarterly	Finalist	
2007	Scott Pilgrim & The Infinite Sadness	Bryan Lee O'Malley	Oni Press	Finalist	
2007	Gilded Lilies	Jillian Tamaki	Conundrum Press	Finalist	
2007	Nog-a-dod	Marc Bell (editor)	Conundrum Press	Finalist	
2006	Paul Moves Out	Michel Rabagliati	Drawn & Quarterly	Winner	
2006	Pyongyang: A Journey in North Korea	Guy Delisle	Drawn & Quarterly	Finalist	
2006	Scott Pilgrim Versus the World	Bryan Lee O'Malley	Oni	Finalist	
2006	Dragonslippers: This Is What an Abusive Relationship Looks Like	Rosalind B. Penfold	Grove Press	Finalist	
2006	Wimbledon Green	Seth	Drawn & Quarterly	Finalist	
2005	Clyde Fans: Book One	Seth	Drawn & Quarterly	Winner	
2005	Worn Tuff Elbow #1	Marc Bell	Fantagraphics Books	Finalist	
2005	Pamplemoussi	Geneviève Castrée	L'Oie de Cravan	Finalist	
2005	The Frank Ritza Papers	David Collier	Drawn & Quarterly	Finalist	
2005	DC: The New Frontier	Darwyn Cooke	DC Comics	Finalist	
