= The Nipper (award) =

Canadian literary award for comics

- Awarded for: Excellence in graphic novels and comics
- Country: Canada
- First award: 2005

The Nipper (also known as the Spotlight Award) is a Canadian literary award for emerging talent in comics and graphic novels. It is a part of the Doug Wright Awards, and has been given out annually since 2005. It is named after the comic strip character by the late Canadian cartoonist Doug Wright.

== Winners and nominees ==
Year	Author	Title	Publisher	Result	Reference
2026	Lis Xu	Layover (Self-published), Raccoon Rescue (Gytha Press), and Mad (Self-published)	Self-published (Layover and Mad), Gytha Press (Raccoon Rescue)	Winner	
2026	Mollie Cronin	Future Me Is Fat	Conundrum	Finalist	
2026	Jordana Globerman	Soul Machine	Annick Press	Finalist	
2026	Stefano Jun	Modern Asian Family: Straight Outta Busan	Renegade Arts Entertainment	Finalist	
2026	Alex Swift	The Connoisseurs	Frog Farm	Finalist	
2025	Boum, translated by Robin Lang and Helge Dascher	The Jellyfish	Pow Pow Press	Winner	
2025	James Collier	Ballpark	Wig Shop & More or Less Books	Finalist	
2025	Rosena Fung	Age 16	Annick Press	Finalist	
2025	Frances V. Reilly	The Harrowing Tales of La Corriveau	Dirty Water Comics	Finalist	
2025	Sid Sharp	Bog Myrtle	Annick Press	Finalist	
2024	Vincy Lim	When I was a kid I was taught how to die. Now that I'm an adult I'm learning how to live. (I love you.) and When She Set Fire to My Friends’ Houses	Self-published	Winner	
2024	James Collier	The Lonesome Shepherd	Wig Shop	Finalist	
2024	Syd Madia	Syd Madia's Dracula	Self-published	Finalist	
2024	Christopher Twin	Bad Medicine	Emanata/Conundrum Press	Finalist	
2024	Kyle Vingoe-Cram	Kettle Harbour	Conundrum Press	Finalist	
2023	Jonathan Dyck	Shelterbelts	Conundrum Press	Winner	
2023	Emily Carrington	Our Little Secret	Drawn & Quarterly	Finalist	
2023	Kiona Callihoo Ligtvoet	We Were Younger Once	Conundrum Press	Finalist	
2023	Lynette Richards	Call Me Bill	Conundrum Press/Emanata Imprint	Finalist	
2023	Adam de Souza	Blind Alley No. 1, ISH	Self-Published, Silver Sprocket	Finalist	
2022	Sami Alwani	The Pleasure of the Text	Conundrum Press	Winner	
2022	Sofia Alarcon	Endsickness No. 1	Self-published	Finalist	
2022	Brigitte Archambault	The Shiatsung Project	Conundrum Press	Finalist	
2022	Alexander Laird	Sleemor Gank: Burg Land No. 1	Self-published	Finalist	
2022	Kyle Simmers and Ryan Danny Owen	Pass Me By: Gone Fishin’ and Pass Me By: Electric Vice		Finalist	
2021	Veronica Post	Langosh & Peppi: Fugitive Days	Conundrum Press	Winner	
2021	Adam de Souza	A Gleaming No. 2	Self-published	Finalist	
2021	Kimberly Edgar	The Space In Between	Self-published	Finalist	
2021	Courtney Loberg	We Don't Go Through the Angelgrass	Self-published	Finalist	
2021	Shannon M. Reeves	Restless Bones	Gytha Press	Finalist	
2020	Sylvia Nickerson	Creation	Drawn & Quarterly	Winner	
2020	D. Boyd	Chicken Rising	Conundrum Press	Finalist	
2020	Jason Bradshaw	Things Go Wrong	Paper Rocket	Finalist	
2020	Ben O’Neil	Apologetica	Popnoir Editions	Finalist	
2020	Cole Pauls	Dakwäkãda Warriors	Conundrum Press	Finalist	
2019	Ariane Dénommé	100 Days in Uranium City	Conundrum Press	Winner	
2019	Aminder Dhaliwal	Woman World	Drawn & Quarterly	Finalist	
2019	Al Gofa	Dark Angels of Darkness	Peow Studio	Finalist	
2019	Victor Martins	Stay and You Don't Have To be Afraid of Me		Finalist	
2019	Sylvia Nickerson	All We Have Left Is This		Finalist	
2019	Eric Kostiuk Williams	Our Wretched Town Hall	Retrofit Comics		
2018	Jenn Woodall	Magical Beatdown Vol. 2 and Marie and Worrywart		Winner	
2018	Kris Bertin and Alexander Forbes	The Case of the Missing Men	Conundrum Press	Finalist	
2018	Gillian Blekkenhorst	All-Inclusive Fully Automated Vacation and House of Strays		Finalist	
2018	Eric Kostiuk Williams	Condo Heartbreak Disco	Koyama Press	Finalist	
2018	Jason Loo	The Pitiful Human-Lizard Nos. 12, 13 and 14	Chapterhouse Comics	Finalist	
2017	Steve Wolfhard	Cat Rackham	Koyama Press	Winner	
2017	Jessica Campbell	Hot or Not: 20th-Century Male Artists	Koyama Press	Finalist	
2017	GG	These Days, Lapse (both from š! No. 25 [kuš!]), and an untitled story from Altcomics Magazine 3	2dcloud	Finalist	
2017	Nathan Jurevicius	Birthmark	Koyama Press	Finalist	
2017	Laura Ķeniņš	Alien Beings	kuš!	Finalist	
2017	Brie Moreno	Dearest, Gift Shop 3D, Missy, untitled story from š! No. 6, various web comics	Oireau (Gift Shop 3D), kuš! (untitled story from š! No. 6)	Finalist	
2016	Dakota McFadzean	Don't Get Eaten By Anything	Conundrum Press	Winner	
2016	Ted Gudlat	Funny Ha-Has	Roads Publishing	Finalist	
2016	Rebecca Roher	Mom Body	The Nib	Finalist	
2016	Sabrina Scott	Witchbody		Finalist	
2016	Kat Verhoeven	Towerkind	Conundrum Press	Finalist	
2015	Meags Fitzgerald	Photobooth: A Biography	Conundrum Press	Winner	
2015	Aaron Costain	Entropy #10		Finalist	
2015	Elisabeth Belliveau	One Year in America	Conundrum Press	Finalist	
2015	Julie Delporte	Everywhere Antennas	Drawn & Quarterly	Finalist	
2015	Simon Roy	Tiger Lung	Dark Horse	Finalist	
2015	Sophie Yanow	War of Streets and Houses	Uncivilized Books	Finalist	
2014	Steven Gilbert	The Journal of the Main Street Secret Lodge		Winner	
2014	Connor Willumsen	"Calgary: Death Milks a Cow", "Treasure Island", "Mooncalf", and "Passionfruit"		Finalist	
2014	Dakota McFadzean	Other Stories and the Horse You Rode in On		Finalist	
2014	Patrick Kyle	Distance Mover #7–12, New Comics #1–2		Finalist	
2014	Georgia Webber	Dumb #1–3		Finalist	
2013	Nina Bunjevac	Heartless	Conundrum Press	Winner	
2013	Brandon Graham	King City	Image Comics	Finalist	
2013	Patrick Kyle	Black Mass, Distance Mover, Wowee Zonk #4		Finalist	
2013	George Walker	Mysterious Death of Tom Thomson	The Porcupine's Quill	Finalist	
2013	Eric Kostiuk Williams	Hungry Bottom Comics		Finalist	
2012	Ethan Rilly	Pope Hats #2		Winner	
2012	E. M. Carroll	"The Seven Windows" (from The Anthology Project vol. 2), "Margot's Room" and "The Prince & the Sea" (and other comics at emcarroll.com/comic)		Finalist	
2012	Patrick Kyle	Black Mass # 5 – 6		Finalist	
2012	Betty Liang	Wet T-shirt #1, "It's Only a Secret if You Don't Tell Anyone" (in š! #9), "Anna Freud's Recurring Dream" (and other comics at bettyliang.tumblr.com)		Finalist	
2012	Zach Worton	The Klondike		Finalist	
2011	Alex Fellows	Spain and Morocco		Winner	
2011	Aaron Costain	Entropy # 5		Finalist	
2011	Keith Jones	Catland Empire	Drawn & Quarterly	Finalist	
2011	James Stokoe	Orc Stain Volume One	Image	Finalist	
2011	Tin Can Forest (aka Marek Colek and Pat Shewchuk)	Baba Yaga and the Wolf	Koyama Press	Finalist	
2010	Michael DeForge	Lose #1, Cold Heat Special #7	Koyama Press; Picturebox	Winner	
2010	Adam Bourret	I'm Crazy		Finalist	
2010	Pascal Girard	Nicolas	Drawn & Quarterly	Finalist	
2010	John Martz	It's Snowing Outside, We Should Go for a Walk		Finalist	
2010	Sully	The Hipless Boy	Conundrum Press	Finalist	
2009	Kate Beaton	History Comics	Self-published	Winner	
2009	Caitlin Black	Maids in the Mist	Self-published	Finalist	
2009	Jesse Jacobs	Blue Winter, Shapes in the Snow	Self-published	Finalist	
2009	Jason Kieffer	Kieffer #2	Self-published	Finalist	
2009	Nick Maandag	Jack & Mandy	Self-published	Finalist	
2008	Jeff Lemire	Essex County Vol. 1: Tales from the Farm and Vol. 2: Ghost Stories	Top Shelf Productions	Winner	
2008	Ethan Rilly	Pope Hats		Finalist	
2008	Jason Kieffer	Kieffer #1		Finalist	
2008	Nick Maandag	The Experiment		Finalist	
2007	Rebecca Kraatz	House of Sugar	Tulip Tree Press	Winner	
2007	Hope Larson	Gray Horses	Oni	Finalist	
2007	Leanne Shapton	Was She Pretty?	Farrar, Straus & Giroux	Finalist	
2007	Keith Jones	Bacter-area	Drawn & Quarterly	Finalist	
2007	Tamara Berger and Sophie Cossette	Mendacity	Kiss Machine	Finalist	
2006	Lorenz Peter	Dark Adaptation		Winner	
2006	Scott Chantler	Northwest Passage Vol. 1	Oni Press	Finalist	
2006	Marc Ngui	The Unexpurgated Tale of Lordie Jones	Conundrum Press	Finalist	
2006	Mariko Tamaki and Jillian Tamaki	Skim		Finalist	
2006	James Turner	Nil: A Land Beyond Belief	Slave Labor Graphics	Finalist	
2005	Bryan Lee O'Malley	Scott Pilgrim's Precious Little Life	Oni Press	Winner	
2005	Rebecca Dart	Rabbithead	Alternative Comics	Finalist	
2005	Max Douglas / Salgood Sam	Revolver #1	Self-published	Finalist	
2005	Alex Fellows	Canvas	Fantagraphics	Finalist	
