= E. M. Carroll =

Canadian comics author (born 1983)

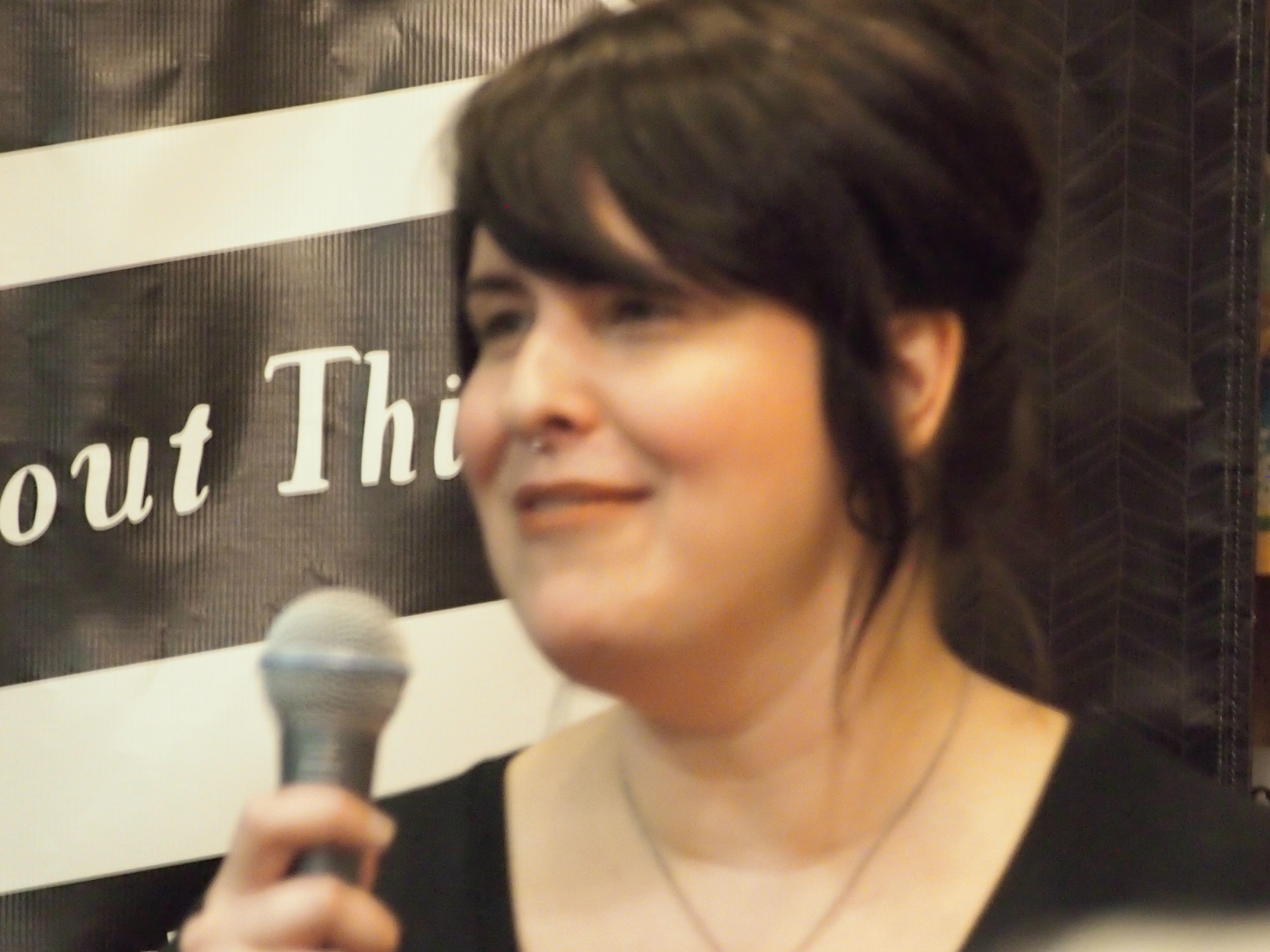
- Carroll in 2018
- Born: 1983 (age 42–43) London, Ontario, Canada
- Spouse: Kate Craig

E. M. Carroll (previously credited as Emily Carroll, born 1983) is a comics author from Ontario, Canada. Carroll started making comics in 2010, and their horror webcomic His Face All Red went viral around Halloween of 2010. Since then, Carroll has published three books, created comics for various comics anthologies, and provided illustrations for other works. Carroll has won several awards, including an Ignatz and two Eisners.

== Career ==
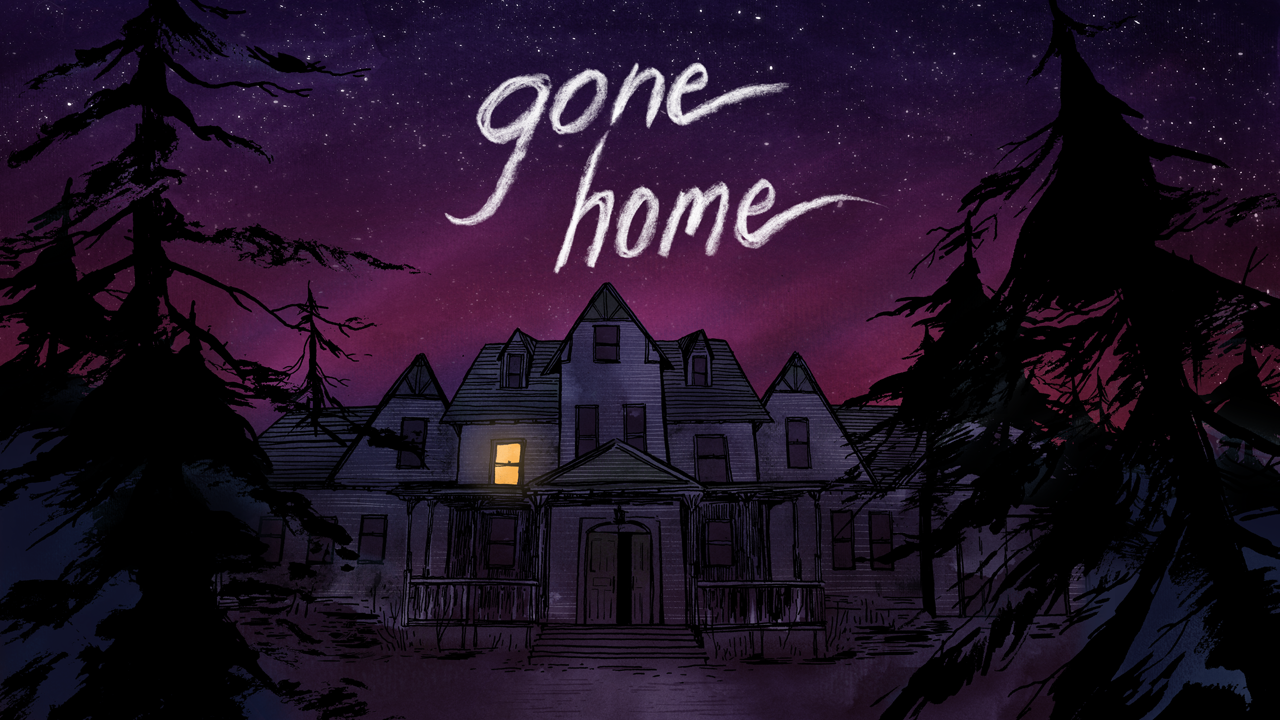
E. M. Carroll created illustrations for 2013 video game Gone Home.

Carroll was educated as an animator. They began drawing comics in 2010.

=== Webcomics ===
Carroll drew and published their first comic on their website in May 2010. Their third webcomic, His Face All Red, was released on October 31, 2010, and went viral soon after.

Carroll has continued to publish short horror comics on their website. For their 2014 webcomic The Hole the Fox Did Make, Carroll attempted to create unease using a limited format. This webcomic was made during breaks between other work, and the format facilitated drawing in "small chunks". Another webcomic, Margot's Room, presents the reader with a child's bedroom; clicking on objects in the room presents parts of the story. A poem at the start suggests a reading order, but the comic can be read in any order. Their 2016 webcomic Some Other Animal's Meat was adapted as "The Outside" for the Netflix horror anthology Guillermo del Toro's Cabinet of Curiosities (2022).

As of January 2026, the latest webcomic on their website is A Pretty Place, published in 2023.

=== Print ===
Carroll's work has been included in a number of comic anthologies, including Explorer: Mystery Boxes, Fairy Tale Comics, Creepy and The Witching Hour.

In 2014, Carroll published Through the Woods, an anthology of four original stories and an adaptation of His Face All Red for the print format. According to CBR, it was first announced in 2011 and was to be titled His Face All Red and Other Stories. About adapting a webcomic to print, Carroll said: "I think it might be more successful on the screen, to be honest. Because page turns became really important. With horror comics or any sort of suspense comics, if you have a set up for a scare on the left-hand page and the scare itself on the right-hand page the effect would disappear immediately." Through the Woods won Eisner, Ignatz, and British Fantasy awards.

Carroll illustrated the 2015 graphic novel Baba Yaga's Assistant from Candlewick Press and a 2018 graphic novel adaptation of Speak. In 2019, they published When I Arrived at the Castle, a graphic novel which they wrote and illustrated. In 2023, they published A Guest in the House, an adult horror graphic novel, through First Second Books.

=== Other media ===
Carroll created illustrations for the 2013 indie video games Gone Home and The Yawhg.

== Reception ==
Articles at CBR have described Carroll as a "webcomics wunderkind" and "a master of atmosphere and mood." They have praising Carroll's "vibrant colors, exquisite pacing, and genuinely creepy, genuinely bleak stories of murder and monstrousness." The magazine Room said of their work: "Beautiful, yet delicately sinister, fairy-tale comics evoke a feeling of isolation that twists into suspense as the reader clicks and scrolls through a horror story and that lingers in the mind long after the final panel." Paste Magazine called their comic The Hole the Fox Did Make one of the best webcomics of 2014.

Carroll's 2019 book, When I Arrived at the Castle, received positive reviews. The Comics Journal said that Carrol has an "incredible capacity to scare" and that "while there is a moral, Carroll deftly avoids moralizing." A review for WomenWriteAboutComics called it a "dark, delicious fantasy" and said: "It's the kind of story that needs multiple readings, not because it's confusing, but because there's so much to unravel, so much thematic detail to sift through." PopMatters rated it 8 out of 10.

Their 2023 release A Guest in the House was likewise positively received, earning a starred review from Booklist. The Comics Journal hailed the graphic novel as "a resounding success of horror in the medium of comics" that "goes beyond the many preconceived notions of the genre to explore identity, isolation, [and] what it means to belong." The Beat, calling it "one of the best comics of the year," observed a "strong plot with tonal and atmospheric visual choices so subtle, many readers might not know what the cartoonist is up to, not technically, but they sure will feel the effects." A more mixed review from NPR held that the book was "an impressively long and gorgeous volume that delivers an uncanny, wild ride" but that the "mechanics of its plot are a bit more unsteady." The book was listed as one of the "best Canadian comics of 2023" by the CBC and one of the "notable books of 2023" by The New York Times.

== Awards ==
Year	Nominated work	Award	Category	Result	Ref.
2011		Joe Shuster Award	Outstanding Web Comics Creator	Won	
2012		Joe Shuster Award	Outstanding Web Comics Creator	Won	
2012		Doug Wright Award	Spotlight Award	Nominated	
2014	"Out of Skin"	Doug Wright Award	Pigskin Peters Award	Won	
2015	Through the Woods	British Fantasy Award	Best Comic/Graphic Novel	Won	
2015	Through the Woods	Ignatz Awards	Outstanding Artist	Won	
2015	Through the Woods	Eisner Awards	Best Graphic Album—Reprint	Won	
2015	"When the Darkness Presses"	Eisner Awards	Best Short Story	Won	
2019	"Beneath the Dead Oak Tree"	Joe Shuster Award	Outstanding Cartoonist	Won	
2024	A Guest in the House	Doug Wright Award	Best Comic	Won	
2024	A Guest in the House	Lambda Literary Awards	LGBTQ+ Comics	Won (Note: They were one of the signatories of an open letter to Lambda Literary from many of the finalists that issued a "call for the organization to meaningfully support Palestinian liberation.")	
2024	A Guest in the House	Los Angeles Times Book Prize	Graphic Novel/Comics	Won (Note: In their acceptance speech they called for the Book Prize's host, the University of Southern California, to restore valedictorian Asna Tabassum's commencement appearance.)	

== Personal life ==
Carroll was born in London, Ontario. Their parents divorced when Carroll was in high school. As of 2014, they are based in Stratford, Ontario. They are married to Kate Craig.

== Publications ==
- Through the Woods. New York: Margaret K. McElderry Books. 2014. ISBN 9781442465961, OCLC 885365003
- "Ann by the Bed" (Frontier #6). San Francisco: Youth in Decline. 2014. OCLC 915825979
- Marika McCoola; Emily Carroll (2015). Baba Yaga's Assistant. Somerville: Candlewick Press. ISBN 9780763669614, OCLC 1003143156.
- "Beneath the Dead Oak Tree". Leeds: Shortbox. 2018. OCLC 1079067301
- Laurie Halse Anderson; Emily Carroll (2018). Speak: The Graphic Novel. New York: Farrar, Straus and Giroux. ISBN 9780374300289, OCLC 974448720
- When I Arrived at the Castle. Toronto: Koyama Press. 2019. ISBN 9781927668689, OCLC 1106371579
- A Guest in the House. New York: First Second. 2023. ISBN 9781250255525, OCLC 1393169275
