= The Egghead =

Canadian literary award for comics

- Awarded for: Comics and graphic novels
- Country: Canada
- First award: 2020

The Egghead is a Canadian literary award for comics and graphic novels aimed at children aged 12 and under. It is a part of the Doug Wright Awards, and has been given out annually since 2020.

== History ==
The award was established in 2020. Previously, works aimed at a child audience could compete for the other Doug Wright awards, with the Egghead being created after people believed that child-oriented works were unique enough to have their own category. The award's title is taken from the initial planned name for Doug Wright's comic strip character Nipper.

== Winner and nominees ==
Year	Title	Author	Publisher	Result	Reference
2026	Howler Reef	Mike Deas and Nancy Deas	Orca Book Publishers	Winner	
2026	Way off Track	Carl Brundtland and Claudia Dávila	Kids Can Press	Finalist	
2026	Fantastic Lou	Qin Leng	Tundra Books	Finalist	
2026	Paisley & Peck: Jurassic Farm	J. Torres and Mike Deas	Owlkids	Finalist	
2026	My Sister the Werebeast	Alina Tysoe	First Second	Finalist	
2025	Lost at Windy River: A True Story of Survival	Trina Rathgeber, Alina Pete, Jillian Dolan	Orca Book Publishers	Winner	
2025	Alterations	Ray Xu	Union Square Kids	Finalist	
2025	The New Girl	Cassandra Calin	Graphix/Scholastic	Finalist	
2025	The Racc Pack	Stephanie Cooke, Whitney Gardner	Simon & Schuster Books for Young Readers	Finalist	
2025	The Shit Witch	Lis Xu	Self-published	Finalist	
2024	Otis & Peanut	Naseem Hrab and Kelly Collier	Owlkids	Winner	
2024	ThunderBoom	Jack Briglio and Claudia Dávila	Kids Can Press	Finalist	
2024	Pluto Rocket: New in Town	Paul Gilligan	Tundra Books	Finalist	
2024	Hockey Girl Loves Drama Boy	Faith Erin Hicks	First Second	Finalist	
2024	Bad Medicine	Christopher Twin	Emanata/Conundrum	Finalist	
2023	You Know, Sex	Cory Silverberg and Fiona Smyth	Triangle Square	Winner	
2023	Scout is Not a Band Kid	Jade Armstrong	Random House Graphic	Finalist	
2023	Paws: Mindy Makes Some Space	Michele Assarasakorn and Nathan Fairbairn	Razorbill	Finalist	
2023	Super Family! (Simon and Chester Book 3)	Cale Atkinson	Tundra Books	Finalist	
2023	The Flamingo	Guojing	Random House Studio	Finalist	
2022	Shirley and Jamila's Big Fall	Gillian Goerz	Dial Books for Young Readers	Winner	
2022	Simon and Chester: Super Sleepover!	Cale Atkinson	Tundra Books	Finalist	
2022	Otter Lagoon	Mike Deas and Nancy Deas	Orca Book Publishers	Finalist	
2022	Living with Viola	Rosena Fung	Annick Press	Finalist	
2022	Over the Shop	JonArno Lawson and Qin Leng	Candlewick Press	Finalist	
2022	Etty Darwin and the Four Pebble Problem	Lauren Soloy	Tundra Books	Finalist	
2021	A Slug Story	Mandi Kujawa, Hana Kujawa, Claude St. Aubin, and Lovern Kindzierski	Renegade Arts Entertainment	Winner	
2021	The Little Ghost Who Was a Quilt	Riel Nason and Byron Eggenschwiler	Tundra Books	Finalist	
2021	Okay, Universe: Chronicles of a Woman in Politics	Valérie Plante and Delphie Côté-Lacroix	Drawn & Quarterly	Finalist	
2021	Grandmother School	Rina Singh and Ellen Rooney	Orca Book Publishers	Finalist	
2021	Swift Fox All Along	Rebecca Thomas and Maya McKibbin	Annick Press	Finalist	
2020	The Worst Book Ever	Elise Gravel	Drawn & Quarterly	Winner	
2020	Brick Breaks Free	David Craig	Self-published	Finalist	
2020	Lunch Quest	Chris Kuzma	Koyama Press	Finalist	
2020	Dakwäkãda Warriors	Cole Pauls	Conundrum Press	Finalist	
2020	Alma and the Beast	Esme Shapiro	Tundra Books	Finalist	
