= The Pigskin Peters =

Canadian literary award for comics

- Awarded for: Excellence in graphic novels and comics
- Country: Canada
- First award: 2008

The Pigskin Peters Award is a Canadian literary award for comics and graphic novels. It is a part of the Doug Wright Awards, and has been given out annually since 2008.

== History ==
The award is named after Pigskin Peters, a character in the comic strip Birdseye Center by Jimmy Frise.

The Pigskins Peters is awarded to comics published by small or micro presses. It was formerly targeted at comics that were deemed avant-grade or otherwise non-traditional.

== Winners and nominees ==
Year	Title	Author	Publisher	Result	Reference
2026	Pass Me By: Lily	Kat Simmers, Ryan Danny Owen	Renegade Arts Entertainment	Winner	
2026	Life After Life	Joshua Barkman	Self-published	Finalist	
2026	Soft Serve & Nosferatu	Matthew Daley	Self-published	Finalist	
2026	Old Souls	Jackarais	Cloudscape Comics Society	Finalist	
2026	Mobile Gang Fortress	Alexander Laird	Frog Farm	Finalist	
2025	Customer Service	Patrick Allaby	Self-published	Winner	
2025	Be Yourself! Oh, Not Like That...	Emilia Strilchuk	Self-published	Finalist	
2025	The Cosmic Con	Ron Kasman	At Bay Press	Finalist	
2025	The Same Water	Richard Fairgray	Richard Sux	Finalist	
2025	The Slenderest of Leashes 1	Xiaoxiao Li	Self-published	Finalist	
2024	Old Caves	Tyler Landry	Uncivilized	Winner	
2024	Endsickness No. 2	Sofia Alarcon	Self-published	Finalist	
2024	The Lonesome Shepherd	James Collier	Wig Shop	Finalist	
2024	Power 9: Part One	John Little and David Little	Self-published	Finalist	
2024	Index	Sven, Rachel Evangeline Chiong, and Joyce Kim	Self-published	Finalist	
2023	Where Have You Been?	Ivana Filipovich, translation by Ivana Filipovich and Andrea Hankinson	Self-Published	Winner	
2023	The Life I Want	Patrick Allaby	Self-Published	Finalist	
2023	Assorted Baggage	Matthew Daley	Black Eye Books	Finalist	
2023	Butterfly House	Troy Little and Brenda Hickey	Pegamoose Press	Finalist	
2023	Thousand Oaks: Machine Mail (Part 3)	Blaise Moritz	Urban Farm Print and Sound	Finalist	
2022	Dwellings No. 2	Jay Stephens	Black Eye Books	Winner	
2022	Endsickness No. 1	Sofia Alarcon	Self-published	Finalist	
2022	Fruit/Soil	Kim Edgar	Moniker Press	Finalist	
2022	The Northern Gaze	Akeeshoo Chislett, Chris Caldwell, Cole Pauls, Andrew Sharp, Juliann Fraser, Esther Bordet, Alison McCreesh, Keith Verbonac, Princess J; edited by Kim Edgar	Hecate Press	Finalist	
2022	Sleemor Gank: Burg Land No. 1	Alexander Laird	Self-published	Finalist	
2021	The Noiseless Din	Scott Carruthers	Popnoir Editions	Winner	
2021	The Desecration	Scott Carruthers and Sally McKay	Self-published	Finalist	
2021	A Gleaming No. 2	Adam de Souza	Self-published	Finalist	
2021	The Space In Between	Kimberly Edgar	Self-published	Finalist	
2021	Awkward Pause	Ryan Harby	Renegade Arts Entertainment	Finalist	
2020	Gleem	Freddy Carrasco	Peow Studios	Winner	
2020	Boumeries, Vol. 9	Boum	Self-published	Finalist	
2020	Baby in the Boneyard	Jesse Jacobs	Hollow Press	Finalist	
2020	Curb Angels	Lisa Mendis, Christopher Ducharme, Lucas C. Pauls	At Bay Press	Finalist	
2020	Dejects	Jay Stephens	Black Eye Books	Finalist	
2019	Retomber	Xiaoxiao Li		Winner	
2019	Eggshell 2	William Dereume (dogg)		Finalist	
2019	Winter's Cosmos	Michael Comeau	Koyama Press	Finalist	
2019	Promising Jupiter	Ron Hotz		Finalist	
2019	310, 310	Mushbuh	Peow Studio	Finalist	
2018	The Dead Father	Sami Alwani		Winner	
2018	The Death of the Master	Patrick Kyle		Finalist	
2018	Crohl's House No. 1 and 2	Alexander Laird, Jamiel Rahi and Robert Laird		Finalist	
2018	Creation: The First Three Chapters	Sylvia Nickerson		Finalist	
2018	Potluck	Wavering Line Collective		Finalist	
2017	The Palace of Champions	Henriette Valium	Conundrum Press	Winner	
2017	Carpet Sweeper Tales	Julie Doucet	Drawn & Quarterly	Finalist	
2017	Draw Blood	Ron Hotz		Finalist	
2017	Garbage	Matthew Reichertz	Conundrum Press	Finalist	
2017	After Land	Chris Taylor	Floating World Comics	Finalist	
2016	New Comics Nos. 6 & 7	Patrick Kyle		Winner	
2016	Leather Vest	Michael Comeau		Finalist	
2016	Intelligent Sentient?	Luke Ramsey	Drawn & Quarterly	Finalist	
2016	We Are Going To Bremen To Be Musicians	Tin Can Forest and Geoff Berner		Finalist	
2016	Agalma	Stanley Wany	Éditions Trip	Finalist	
2015	Swinespritzen	Connor Willumsen		Winner	
2015	Comics Collection 2010–2013 and Less than Dust	Julien Ceccaldi		Finalist	
2015	Great Success! 1983–2013 and Less than Dust	Henriette Valium	Crna Hronika	Finalist	
2015	New Comics #3–5	Patrick Kyle	Mother Books	Finalist	
2015	Undocumented: The Architecture of Migrant Detention	Tings Chak	The Architecture Observer	Finalist	
2014	Out of Skin	E. M. Carroll		Winner	
2014	Calgary: Death Milks a Cow	Connor Willumsen		Finalist	
2014	Flexible Tube with Stink Lines	Seth Scriver		Finalist	
2014	Journal	Julie Delporte	Koyama Press	Finalist	
2014	Very Casual	Michael DeForge	Koyama Press	Finalist	
2013	Hamilton Illustrated	David Collier	Wolsak & Wynn	Winner	
2013	Hellberta #2 and "Sir Softly" from š! #12	Michael Comeau		Finalist	
2013	4PANEL comics in Carousel Magazine #28 & #29	Michael DeForge, Larry Eisenstein, Jesse Jacobs, Mark Laliberte (editor), Marc Ngui, Ethan Rilly, Tin Can Forest and Magda Trzaski		Finalist	
2013	So, what should we do with ourselves?... from Wowee Zonk #4 and Little Stump in š! #12	Ginette Lapalme		Finalist	
2012	Hellberta	Michael Comeau		Winner	
2012	Hermoddities	Temple Bates		Finalist	
2012	Pure Pajamas	Marc Bell		Finalist	
2012	Untitled	Mum Pittsburg		Finalist	
2012	Jupiter Leucetius! Send Us a King. We Are So Bored (and other comics at connorwillumsen.com)	Connor Willumsen		Finalist	
2011	Spotting Deer	Michael DeForge	Koyama Press	Winner	
2011	Interior Voice	Jillian Tamaki	Drawn & Quarterly	Finalist	
2011	Stooge Pile	Seth Scriver	Drawn & Quarterly	Finalist	
2011	So I’ve Been Told	Maryanna Hardy	Conundrum Press	Finalist	
2011	Wowee Zonk #3	Patrick Kyle, Ginette Lapalme, and Chris Kuzma (editors)	Koyama Press	Finalist	
2010	Hot Potatoe	arc Bell	Drawn and Quarterly	Winner	
2010	Bebete	Simon Bosse	L’Oie de Cravan	Finalist	
2010	Dirty Dishes	Amy Lockhart	Drawn & Quarterly	Finalist	
2010	Never Learn Anything From History	Kate Beaton	Drawn & Quarterly	Finalist	
2010	The Collected Doug Wright Volume One	Doug Wright	Drawn & Quarterly	Finalist	
2009	Ojingogo	Matthew Forsythe	Drawn & Quarterly	Winner	
2009	Hall of Best Knowledge	Ray Fenwick	Fantagraphics	Finalist	
2009	All We Ever Do is Talk About Wood	Tom Horacek	Drawn & Quarterly	Finalist	
2009	Small Victories	Jesse Jacobs	Self-published	Finalist	
2008	Milk Teeth	Julie Morstad	Drawn & Quarterly	Winner	
2008	Little Lessons in Safety	Emily Holton	Conundrum Press	Finalist	
2008	Excelsior 1968	John Martz	Self-published	Finalist	
2008	Fire Away	Chris von Szombathy	Drawn & Quarterly	Finalist	
