= Joe Ollmann =

Canadian cartoonist

- Born: March 25, 1966 (age 60) Hamilton, Ontario, Canada
- Area: Cartoonist
- Notable works: This Will All End in Tears, Mid-Life, The Abominable Mr. Seabrook
- Awards: 2007 Best Book Doug Wright Award

Joe Ollmann (born March 25, 1966, in Hamilton, Ontario) is a Canadian cartoonist. Ollmann's cartooning style has been described as "scratchy angular angry big steaming slice-of-life comics” and the cartoonist Seth has called Ollmann “one of our medium’s great writers.”

== Early life ==
Ollmann grew up on a Christmas tree farm near Hamilton, Ontario and self-published his first 3-issue comic book series, Dirty Nails Comics, beginning in 1988. He contributed cartoons to The Hamilton Spectator in the early 1990s, and had a long-running strip in Exclaim! magazine. He began publishing short comics stories in his own self-published anthology series Wag! in 1991, continuing for 9 issues to 2004 and compiled in The Big Book of Wag! (Conundrum Press, 2005). Insomniac Press published his first original collection of short stories in 2002 as Chewing on Tinfoil.

== Comics ==
Ollmann's third collection of short stories, This Will All End in Tears (Conundrum Press, 2006) won the Doug Wright Award for Best Book, bringing praise from critics:

"What contradictions, what energy, what tension, what struggle, what humour, what characters!" said writer Judy MacDonald, speaking on behalf of the five-member Wright Award jury. Ollman's collection transport readers "into cramped and messy living rooms where we discard ourselves and want to stay," she said. "These stories and characters aren't tidy. The ends aren't tidy. Life, fear isn't tidy," she said. "Art doesn't have to be tidy either."

Drawn & Quarterly published Ollmann's first graphic novel Mid-Life in 2011. The semi-autobiographical book follows a hapless version of Ollmann as he pursues an affair with a children's music performer. In a National Post review, critic Jeet Heer praised the book, remarking that:

"The great strength of Mid-Life is Ollmann’s art, which might at a quick glance look unappetizing. He draws with a gnarly, blunt line and his characters have a misshapen, antagonizing appearance. Yet their ungainly surface is a perfect mirror for their messy lives. Rarely are form and content so aptly aligned in a comic book. Mid-Life is a superb graphic novel, by turns hilarious and appalling.”

In 2017, Drawn & Quarterly published Ollmann's first sustained work of non-fiction, The Abominable Mr. Seabrook, a graphic biography of the writer William Seabrook. The book received generally positive notices, with a reviewer for Publishers Weekly noting:

"Seabrook is just the sort of character that Ollmann is so good at rendering: a complicated, misunderstood, and underappreciated mess of a person whose life was fascinating and whose appetites were, quite literally, as strange as they come. As both a narrative and a story in pictures, this is an early candidate for the year’s best graphic biography.”

In 2026 he published the graphic short story collection The Woodchipper.

== Bibliography ==
- Chewing on Tinfoil (2002)
- The Big Book of Wag! (2005)
- This Will All End in Tears (2006)
- Mid-Life (2011)
- Milo and Sam: Pastoral Return, with Andy Brown (2012)
- Science Fiction (2013)
- Happy Stories About Well-Adjusted People (2014)
- The Abominable Mr. Seabrook (2017)
- Fictional Father (2021)
- The Woodchipper (2026)

== Awards and honours ==
- 2007: Won the Doug Wright Award for Best Book for This Will All End in Tears.
- 2012: Shortlisted for the Doug Wright Award for Best Book for Mid-Life.
- 2021: Shortlisted for the Governor General's Award for English-language fiction for Fictional Father.
