= Tyler Landry =

Canadian cartoonist

Tyler Landry is Canadian cartoonist who is the 2024 Doug Wright Award winner for best small or micro-press book.

== Biography ==
Tyler Landry is a cartoonist from Summerside, who lives and draws in Charlottetown, Prince Edward Island, on the east coast of Canada. He creates alternative comics and works as a cartoonist, illustrator, graphic designer, and instructor. He works in video game production as game artist and previously an art director.

He started the Charlottetown Comics Club for people who want to work on comics to get together with each other and jam.

His graphic novel Old Caves was the winner of the 2024 Doug Wright Award for best small or micro-press book. It also made the 2023 Comic Crush 100 Comics We Love.

== Published comics ==
Title	Publisher	Year
Wanderer of the Wastes	Conundrum Press	2024
By the Lingering Light of a Slowly Dying Sun	Strangers Publishing	2023
Old Caves	Uncivilized Comics	2023
Ignoble Deaths	Self-published	2022
Dungeonoids Volume 1	Self-published	2021
Opal (Dagger Dagger anthology)	Second at Best Publishing	2021
Trabajar para Sobrevivir (Working for a Living)	AIA Editorial/Buen Gusto	2017
Shit and Piss	Retrofit Comics / Big Planet Comics	2016
The Coward's Hole	Study Group/Floating World Comics	2016
Lonesome	Study Group/Floating World Comics	2016

- Vile (Alternative Comics, 2016–2017)

== Recognition ==
Tyler Landry's Old Caves won the 2024 Doug Wright Award The Pigskin Peters Award for best small-or micro-press book.
