= David Collier =

David Collier may refer to:

- David Collier (sports administrator) (1955–2026), English sports administrator
- David Collier (political scientist) (born 1942), political scientist
- David Collier (cartoonist) (born 1963), Canadian alternative cartoonist
- David Collier (footballer) (1957–2021), Welsh footballer
- Dai Collier (1894–1973), Grimsby Town F.C. and Wales international footballer
- David Charles Collier (1871–1934), American real estate developer, civic leader and philanthropist
