= Dave Lapp =

Canadian cartoonist

Dave Lapp is a cartoonist who lives in Toronto, Ontario, Canada. He worked at a city drop-in center, but has been creating alternative comics for more than ten years.

== Works ==
His Drop-In was nominated for the category of Outstanding Graphic Novel at the 2009 Ignatz Awards and for Best Book at the same year's Doug Wright Awards. An excerpt from Drop-In was also chosen for the anthology The Best American Comics 2010. Lapp writes the newspaper strip Children of the Atom for The Georgia Straight which has been published as a collection by Conundrum Press.
