= The Yawhg =

2013 video game

- Developers: Damian Sommer & E. M. Carroll
- Publisher: Damian Sommer
- Platform: Windows
- Release: May 30, 2013
- Genres: Role-playing, adventure
- Modes: Single-player, multiplayer

The Yawhg is a role-playing adventure game created by Damian Sommer and E. M. Carroll. The game was released for Windows on May 30, 2013.

== Gameplay ==
The Yawhg is a one- to four-player choose-your-own-adventure game that randomizes the story every time it is played. Players must decide how they will spend their time over the course of six weeks leading up to a supernatural storm. The players’ actions will decide the fate of the post-storm community.

== Development and release ==
The Yawhg was originally developed when Damian Sommer and Emily Carroll were paired up for TIFF Nexus’ Comics vs. Games showcase. After being received well at the showcase, the pair decided to release the game online.

== Reception ==
Reception

Aggregate score
Aggregator	Score
Metacritic	66/100

Review scores
Publication	Score
Destructoid	7.5/10
GameSpot	6/10
PC Gamer (US)	72%

At the 2014 Independent Games Festival, The Yawhg was nominated for awards in the categories "Excellence in Audio" and "Excellence in Narrative". It also received Honourable Mentions for "Excellence in Visual Art" and "Grand Prize". The game received mixed to positive reviews on its release. On Metacritic, the game holds a score of 66/100 based on 8 reviews.
