= Eric Kostiuk Williams =

Canadian cartoonist and illustrator

- Born: 1990 (age 35–36)
- Area: Cartoonist
- Notable works: Hungry Bottom Comics; Condo Heartbreak Disco; Babybel Wax Bodysuit

Eric Kostiuk Williams (born 1990) is a cartoonist and illustrator based in Toronto, Ontario, Canada. He has been nominated twice for the Doug Wright Spotlight Award: in 2013 for Hungry Bottom Comics, and in 2018 for Condo Heartbreak Disco, which was also nominated for a Lambda Literary Award. In 2017, Williams was nominated for an Eisner Award in Best Single Issue/One-Shot category for Babybel Wax Bodysuit. He is the recipient of the 2018 Queer Press Grant for his graphic novella Our Wretched Town Hall.

== Bibliography ==
- Hungry Bottom Comics (2012), self-published
- Hungry Bottom Comics: 2 Fags 2 Furious (2013), self-published
- Hungry Bottom Comics 3 (2014), self-published
- The Collected Hungry Bottom Comics (2014), Colour Code
- Babybel Wax Bodysuit (2016), Retrofit Comics/Big Planet Comics ISBN 978-1940398624
- Condo Heartbreak Disco (2017), Koyama Press, ISBN 978-1-927668-45-0
- Ley Lines: How Does It Feel In My Arms? (2017), Czap Books/Grindstone Comics
- Our Wretched Town Hall (2018), Retrofit Comics/Big Planet Comics, ISBN 978-1940398822
- 2AM Eternal: A Decade of Queer Nightlife Posters + Comics (2023)
