= David Collier (cartoonist) =

Canadian alternative cartoonist

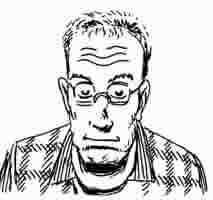
- David Collier, a self portrait
- Born: January 24, 1963 (age 63) Windsor, Ontario, Canada
- Areas: Cartoonist, Writer, Penciller
- Notable works: Collier's; Just The Facts; Surviving Saskatoon

David Collier (born January 24, 1963) is a Canadian alternative cartoonist best known for his fact-based "comic strip essays."

== Biography ==
As a child, Collier was introduced to the work of Robert Crumb, whose work has been a significant influence. (Collier's cross-hatching style is particularly reminiscent of Crumb's work.) Before breaking into comics, Collier served in the Canadian Army from 1987 to 1990. He drew comic strips for the army newspapers the Cornwallis Ensign, CFB Chilliwack Mountaineer, and CFB Valcartier Adsum. His Army training also introduced him to long-distance running and the biathlon, in which he has competed nationally.

His first comic strip was published in 1986 in the R. Crumb-edited magazine Weirdo, and his work has been published in numerous other comics anthologies, including Duplex Planet Illustrated, Drawn & Quarterly, The Comics Journal, and Zero Zero. Most of the material from his anthology submissions was collected in Just the Facts: A Decade of Comic Essays.

Since 1990, Collier has done comics and illustrations for Canadian newspapers such as The Globe and Mail and the Saskatoon StarPhoenix. He has illustrated stories for Harvey Pekar's American Splendor, most notably the three-issue American Splendor: Unsung Hero.

Fantagraphics published four issues of the aptly titled series Collier's in the 1990s. Much of this material was reprinted in Portraits from Life. Drawn & Quarterly later published volume two of Collier's, lasting two issues.

Collier's Surviving Saskatoon documents the true story of David Milgaard, a man who spent over 20 years in prison after he was wrongfully accused of the brutal rape and murder of a nurse in 1969.

Collier featured in a 2013 episode of CBC Radio program Wiretap, describing his experiences rejoining the army at 41, also the subject of his book Chimo.

For the 2014–15 Alex Colville retrospective held at the Art Gallery of Ontario and National Gallery of Canada, Collier produced a commissioned work inspired by Colville that was displayed as an installation and also published in print under the title Colville Comics (2014).

Collier lives with his wife, Ontario artist Jennifer Hambleton, and son James (born in 1999), in Hamilton.

== Awards ==
Collier's The Frank Ritza Papers was nominated for a Doug Wright Award for Best Book in 2005.

Hamilton Illustrated was awarded the Pigskin Peters Award for 2013 at the Toronto Comic Arts Festival. The award recognizes the best in experimental or avant-garde comics.

== Bibliography ==
Comic books
Title	Date	Publisher	ISBN	Notes
Collier's	1992-1998	Fantagraphics		4 issues
Collier's Seattle Sketchbook	1995	Starhead Comics		
Humphry Osmond: Psychedelic Pioneer	1998	Drawn & Quarterly		Collected in Portraits from Life
Surviving Saskatoon	2000	Drawn & Quarterly	978-1894937559	Collected in Portraits from Life
Collier's Volume 2	2001–2003	Drawn & Quarterly		2 issues
Hamilton Sketchbook #2	2010			

Collections and graphic novels
Title	Date	Publisher	ISBN	Notes
Just the Facts: A Decade of Comic Essays	1998	Drawn & Quarterly	978-1896597256	Collects work for various publications
Portraits from Life	2001	Drawn & Quarterly	978-1896597355	Biographical strips
Hamilton Sketchbook	2002	Drawn & Quarterly	978-1896597485	
The Frank Ritza Papers	2004	Drawn & Quarterly	978-1896597911	
Chimo	2011	Conundrum Press	978-1894994538	
Collier's Popular Press	2011	Conundrum Press	978-1894994606	Collects work for newspapers and magazines
Hamilton Illustrated	2012	Wolsak and Wynn	978-1894987707	
Morton: A Cross-Country Rail Journey	2017	Conundrum Press	978-1772620122	
