= Alex Fellows =

Canadian cartoonist, illustrator, and painter (b.1979)

- Born: 1979 (age 46–47)
- Area: Cartoonist
- Notable works: Canvas, Spain and Morocco
- Awards: Doug Wright Award for Best Emerging Talent (2011)
- http://www.alexfellows.com www.alexfellows.com

Alex Fellows (born 1979) is a Canadian cartoonist, illustrator, and painter, based in Montreal, Quebec, Canada.

== Background ==
Fellows' first comic, Blank Slate, was published online in 2002. With the help of a Xeric Grant, he later published a graphic novel.

In 2011, he won the Doug Wright Award for Best Emerging Talent for his comic, Spain and Morocco. He had also been nominated for the award in 2005 Spain & Morocco was published in 2014 by Conundrum Press.
