= Michael DeForge =

Canadian cartoonist

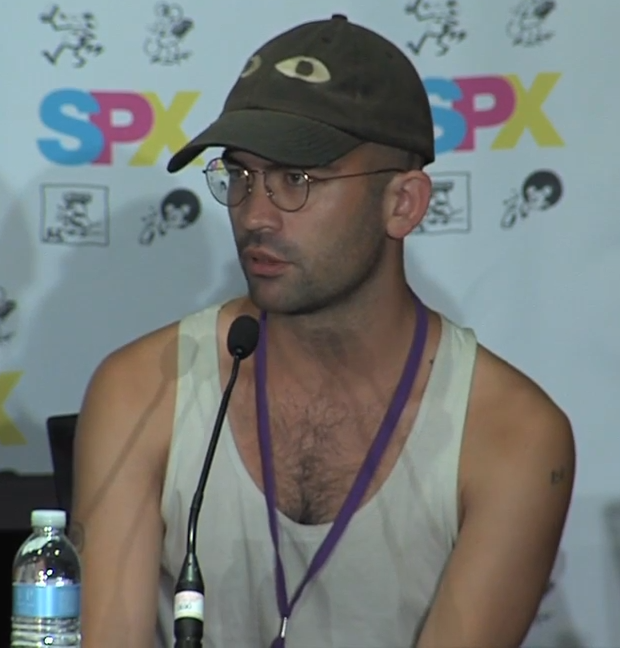
- DeForge in 2017
- Born: 1987 (age 38–39)
- Area: cartoonist
- Notable works: Lose; Very Casual; Ant Colony

Michael DeForge (born 1987) is a Canadian comics artist and illustrator.

== Biography ==
DeForge grew up in Ottawa and attended the University of Toronto, dropping out after two years. He lives and works in Toronto.

According to DeForge, he has "always been drawing cartoons" and learned to read and draw from his parents' comic strip collections such as Bloom County, Far Side, Peanuts and Calvin and Hobbes. He has described Peanuts as his all-time favorite cartoon strip. He read and tried to draw in the style of superhero comics until junior high and high school. He has described his early comics as "just these dinky revenge cartoons" in response to having been "picked on a lot growing up". In high school he realized that drawing could be a vocation and started drawing gig posters, initially in exchange for free entrance to concerts until he started charging for his work. He became interested in the work of Marc Bell (which he saw for first time in Exclaim!) and Matt Brinkman and has described Chester Brown's I Never Liked You as his "introduction to alternative comics". He also cites Chloe Lum and Yannick Desranleau's Seripop work as strongly affecting how he wanted to draw for some time. Artists that he cites as having been important during formative points in his life include Hideshi Hino, Jack Kirby, Derek Jarman, Eduardo Muñoz Bachs, Prince, Mary Blair, Saul Steinberg and Mark Newgarden.

DeForge worked as a designer for Cartoon Network's Adventure Time. He has described his work as a "props and effects designer" with "odd bits of storyboard work, character design and concept art" and "the best day job I could have ever asked for". In 2013, DeForge, along with Ryan Sands, started working on a pilot for Cartoon Network entitled MallNation, which did not make it to air.

He self-identifies as a Socialist.

== Work ==
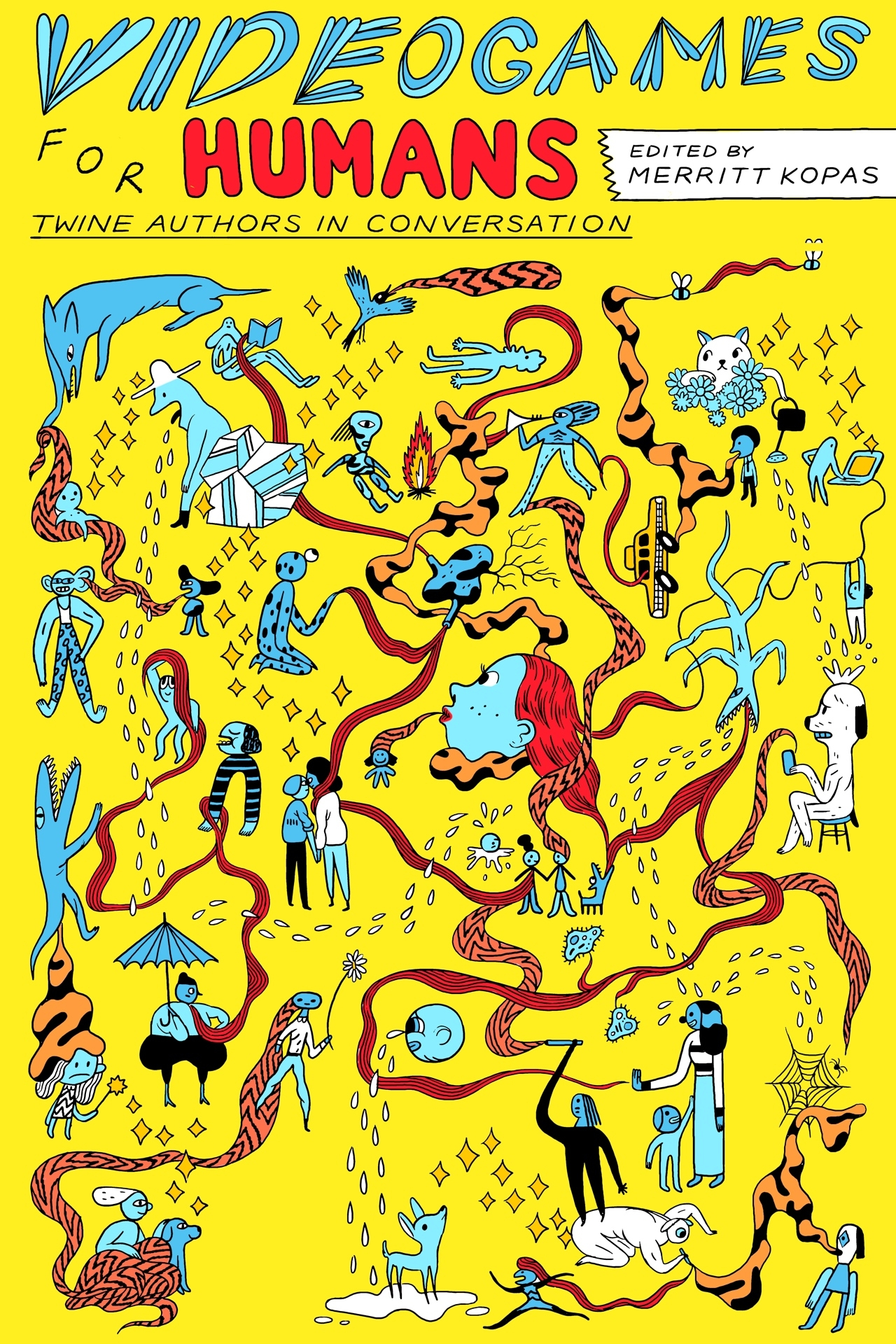
DeForge illustrated the cover of Videogames for Humans in 2015

DeForge had been an active member of the regional Toronto comics scene for several years before his Cave Adventure webcomic and the first issue of Lose brought wider exposure. He has said that attending the 2009 Toronto Comic Arts Festival (TCAF) and seeing all the work at the festival provided him with the impetus to make his own comic series, Lose. He also met Annie Koyama, who became his publisher, at that festival. Before the 2009 TCAF, DeForge had been experimenting with a variety of short comics and strips. He has described Lose as his first "real" comic.

Lose #1, the first issue of his "one-man anthology series", published by Koyama Press in 2009, won "Best Emerging Talent" at the 2010 Doug Wright Awards. Lose #2, published by Koyama in 2010, was nominated in the 2011 Doug Wright Awards "Best Book" category. All but the last 3 pages of the 24 page comic features DeForge's story It's Chip, described by Koyama as "a stand alone horror comic about two children and the monsters they find in the woods". Rob Clough, writing in his High-Low column in The Comics Journal, described it as combining "sibling rivalry and family/school dynamics with weird anthropomorphic cuteness with some truly disgusting, repulsive images", a "tremendous success" and "a story I'd point to if asked to name truly successful and innovative Fusion comics". DeForge has said that "Fusion comics", a term coined by Frank Santoro to describe a cartooning style that fuses influences from a variety of sources such as alternative comics, genre comics, manga and animation, is an appropriate way to describe some of his comics but it's not something he sets out to achieve when working on a comic.

Spotting Deer (2010), a 12-page full-colour comic described by DeForge as documenting "the biology and behavioural patterns of a fictional species of slug called the 'Spotting Deer,' who are deer-shaped and deer-sized and populate most Canadian cities", won the 2011 Pigskin Peters Award for best non-narrative or experimental work. The comic was developed from the initial idea of "formatting it like an encyclopedia entry".

The third issue of DeForge's Lose series was published by Koyama in 2011 and debuted at the 2011 TCAF. DeForge's work won the 2011 Ignatz Award for "Outstanding Comic" and was nominated for the "Outstanding Artist" and "Outstanding Series" awards. Lose #3 also received a nomination for the Doug Wright Award for "Best Book". The issue included the 3 page Improv Night, the main story Dog 2070, Manananggal and some Ant Story strips.

In 2011, Study Group Magazine issue #1 included DeForge's Riders comic. Deforge's 2 page comic Young People was included in Marvel's Strange Tales II (Strange Tales MAX #2) anthology for non-mainstream comics writers and artists, published under the MAX imprint. ComicsAlliance described it as a story where "teenage superheroes flee the scene when powers they can't fully control melt one of their teammates into a puddle of sentient water". "Comics", a two-page spread of assorted comics edited by Alvin Buenaventura's in the print edition of The Believer has included DeForge's Titters strip since 2011. Frank Santoro's Riff Raff column in The Comics Journal included DeForge's Intermission Funnies, a weekly gag strip, from August to December 2011. DeForge's four-part serial Rescue Pet was published in the quarterly magazine Maisonneuve's 2011 issues. Mothers News have published Deforge's monthly strip, Military Prison, since November 2011. DeForge has described the strip as his "Wizard of Id fan fiction". Abbey Loafer, a monthly strip, was published in Offerings, a "non-profit, volunteer-based monthly newspaper that covers Toronto's fringe music and arts scene", from December 2011 until July 2013.

DeForge self-published Open Country #1 in May 2011 and issue #2 in fall 2011. Originally planned as a five-part series, DeForge abandoned it "midway through, destroyed all the artwork for and then threw away all the unsold copies".

DeForge has collaborated with Ryan Sands on a number of projects. In 2010, they co-edited Prison for Bitches, described by DeForge as "a Lady Gaga tribute zine full of artwork, writing, and comics". In 2011 and 2012, they co-edited the three issues of Thickness, "an anthology of erotic comics" published by Youth in Decline. Thickness #1 featured work by Katie Skelly, Jonny Negron, Ze Jian Shen, Derek Ballard, True Chubbo. Thickness #2 featured work by Angie Wang, Brandon Graham, Mickey Zacchilli, Lisa Hanawalt, True Chubbo, Jillian Tamaki and included DeForge's College Girl by Night. Thickness #3 featured work by Lamar Abrams, Jimmy Beaulieu, Edie Fake, Julia Gfrörer, William Cardini and Sean T. Collins, Gengoroh Tagame, True Chubbo, Andy Burkholder and HamletMachine. DeForge and Annie Koyama co-edited Root Rot, a forest themed anthology, in 2011. The anthology included work by Jon Vermilyea, Derek M. Ballard, Dan Zettwoch, T. Edward Bak, Robin Nishio, Ines Estrada, Lizz Hickey, Mickey Zacchili, Jesse Jacobs, Jason Fischer, Hellen Jo, Angie Wang, Greg Pizzoli, Joe Lambert, Bob Flynn and Chris "Elio" Eliopoulos. Although DeForge has said that he has "never actually had much interest in being an editor", he co-edited Thickness and Root Rot because he supported the idea behind each book, and enjoys working with Ryan Sands and Annie Koyama, who he said did most of the "heavy lifting".

In February 2012, Secret Headquarters published DeForge's Incinerator minicomic one-shot, and Exams, an 8-page webcomic, was published online by Study Group. Space Face Books published the 8 page minicomic one-shot Molecule, in November 2012.

The fourth issue of DeForge's Lose series, "the fashion issue", was published by Koyama in September 2012 and debuted at the 2012 Small Press Expo (SPX). It won the 2013 Ignatz Award for "Outstanding Artist" and Lose won the "Outstanding Series" award. The issue included Someone I Know and Canadian Royalty together with shorter stories such as The Sixties.

Smoke Signal #15, published March 2013, included two collaborations with Leslie Stein, Watertest, written by DeForge and drawn by Stein, and It's a Lovely Day in Amsterdam, written by Stein and drawn by DeForge. In 2013, Uncivilized Books published DeForge's Structures 24-34, the third issue in their Structures zine series where artists are asked to contribute 11 designs for new structures. Structures 1-11 was by Tom Kaczynski and Structures 12-23 by Vincent Stall.

In May 2013, Koyama published Very Casual, a collection of what they described as notable short stories from DeForge's mini comics, online comics and anthology contributions. It won the 2013 Ignatz Award for "Outstanding Anthology or Collection". Douglas Wolk, writing in The New York Times, described it as a collection of "perverse, funny, haunting stories" where DeForge "warps and dents the assured, geometrical forms of vintage newspaper strips and new wave-era graphics into oddly adorable horrors". It includes All About the Spotting Deer which Wolk described as starting as "a dry parody of nature documentaries" that "mutates into a vignette about an unhappy author, then into a routine about Canadian self-celebration, and ultimately folds in on itself".

The fifth issue of DeForge's Lose series was published by Koyama in June 2013 and debuted at the 2013 Chicago Alternative Comics Expo (CAKE). The issue included three self-contained stories, Living Outdoors, Muskoka and Recent Hires.

DeForge's monthly webcomic Leather Space Man, has been published on Random House of Canada's Hazlitt site since August 2013. According to Chris Randle, writing for Hazlitt, it "imagines Prince as an unearthly fetish-gear-wreathed enigma, then imagines the implications of that". Space Face Books published The Boy In Question 20 page minicomic one-shot in the summer of 2013. Duk Duk Goose was published online by Study Group in October 2013. The November 2013 issue of ArtReview Magazine including DeForge's 2 page strip Dot Com.

Ant Colony (2014), DeForge's first book-length story, collects his web based weekly strip Ant Comic. Drawn & Quarterly publisher Chris Oliveros described DeForge as "one of those rare talents who emerge, out of the blue, with a fully formed and singularly unique vision" and a "striking visual sensibility and peculiar sense of humor...entirely his own".

== Bibliography ==
=== Collections ===
- Very Casual (2013), Koyama Press, ISBN 978-0987963079
- A Body Beneath (2014), Koyama Press, ISBN 978-1927668078
- Dressing (2015), Koyama Press, ISBN 978-1927668221
- A Western World (2018), Koyama Press, ISBN 978-1927668481
- Heaven No Hell (2021), Drawn & Quarterly, ISBN 978-1770464353
- All The Cameras In My Room (2026), Drawn & Quarterly, ISBN 978-1770468191

=== Books ===
- Ant Colony (2014), Drawn & Quarterly, ISBN 978-1770461376
- First Year Healthy (2015), Drawn & Quarterly, ISBN 978-1770461734
- Big Kids (2016), Drawn & Quarterly, ISBN 978-1770462243
- Sticks Angelica, Folk Hero (2017), Drawn & Quarterly, ISBN 978-1770462700
- Brat (2018), Koyama Press, ISBN 978-1927668603
- Leaving Richard's Valley (2019), Drawn & Quarterly, ISBN 978-1770463431
- Stunt (2019), Koyama Press, ISBN 978-1927668696
- Familiar Face (2020), Drawn & Quarterly, ISBN 978-1770463875
- Birds of Maine (2022), Drawn & Quarterly, ISBN 978-1770465664
- Holy Lacrimony (2025), Drawn & Quarterly, ISBN 978-1770467552
