= Jimmy Frise =

Canadian comic strip cartoonist

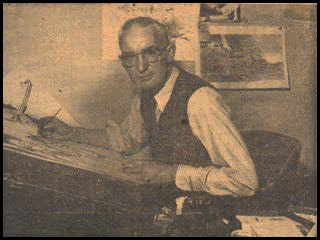
- Jimmy Frise at his drawing board
- Born: James Llewellyn Frise; 16 October 1890 Scugog Island, Ontario, Canada
- Died: June 13, 1948 (aged 56) Toronto, Ontario, Canada
- Area: Cartoonist
- Notable works: Birdseye Center; Juniper Junction
- Awards: Canadian Cartoonist Hall of Fame

Signature
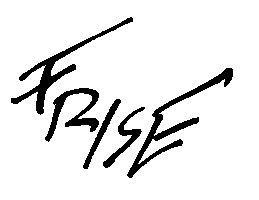

James Llewellyn Frise (/fraɪz/, 16 October 1890 – 13 June 1948) was a Canadian cartoonist best known for his work on the comic strip Birdseye Center and his illustrations of humorous prose pieces by Greg Clark.

Born in Scugog Island, Ontario, Frise moved to Toronto at 19 and found illustration work on the Toronto Star's Star Weekly supplement. His left hand was severely injured at the Battle of Vimy Ridge in 1917 during World War I, but his drawing hand was unhurt, and he continued cartooning at the Star upon his return. In 1919 he began his first weekly comic strip, Life's Little Comedies, which evolved into the rural-centred humorous Birdseye Center in 1923. He moved to the Montreal Standard in 1947, but as the Star kept publication rights to Birdseye Center, Frise continued it as Juniper Junction with strongly similar characters and situations. Doug Wright took over the strip after Frise's sudden death from a heart attack in 1948, and it went on to become the longest-running strip in English-Canadian comics history.

== Life and career ==
James Llewellyn Frise was born 16 October 1890 near Fingerboard in Scugog Island, Ontario. He was the only son of John Frise (d. 1922), who was a farmer, and Hannah née Barker (d. 1933), who had immigrated with her family from England to Port Perry when she was two. He grew up in Seagrave and Myrtle and went to school in Port Perry. There he struggled with spelling—even with his own middle name—and developed an obsession with drawing.

Throughout his teens, friends and teachers encouraged Frise to move to Toronto to pursue a drawing career. In 1910 he moved there, though without aiming to develop his art—rather he sought work and found it as an engraver and printer at the Rolph, Clark, Stone lithography firm; he spent six months drawing maps for the Canadian Pacific Railway company indicating lots for sale in Saskatchewan.

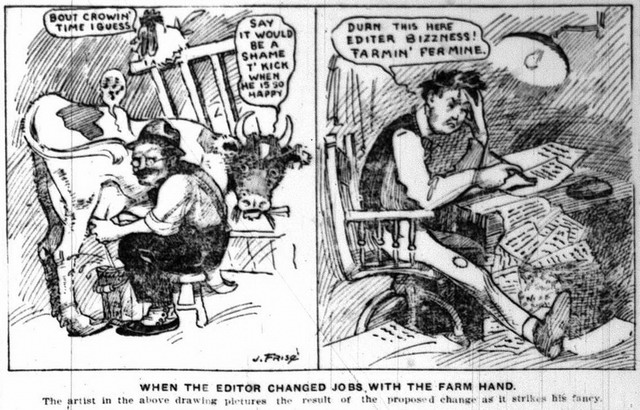
Frise's first published cartoon, Star Weekly, 12 November 1910

While seeking another job he read in the Toronto Star an exchange between a farmer and an editor in which the editor extolled the virtues of farm life only to have the farmer rebut him and challenge him to try out farming. Frise drew a cartoon of the editor struggling to milk a cow and a farmer as an editor; he submitted it to the Star, where it appeared in the Star Weekly supplement on that 12 November. He visited the Star's offices the following Monday and the Editor-in-Chief hired him immediately. He began by lettering titles and touching up photos until the Star Weekly's editor J. Herbert Cranston enlisted him for his drawing skills. Frise illustrated news stories and the children's feature The Old Mother Nature Club, and did political cartoons. His cartoons also appeared in publications such as the Owen Sound Sun.

Frise took a job at an engraving firm in Montreal in 1916 and in the midst of World War I enlisted in the military that 17 May. He had had two years previous experience with the 48th Highlanders of Canada and served at first served in the 69th Battery of the Canadian Field Artillery. He was deployed overseas that September and by November was serving in the 12th Battery at the front, where he employed his farm experience driving horses to move artillery and ammunition. At the Battle of Vimy Ridge his left hand was severely injured when an enemy shell exploded at an ammunition dump where he was delivering loads of shells. The Star reported its anxiety over the possible loss of "one of Canada’s most promising cartoonists", but his drawing hand—his right—was uninjured. He was discharged after recuperating in Chelmsford, England, and arrived back in Toronto on 1 December 1917 and returned to work, first at the Star and shortly after at the Star Weekly again.

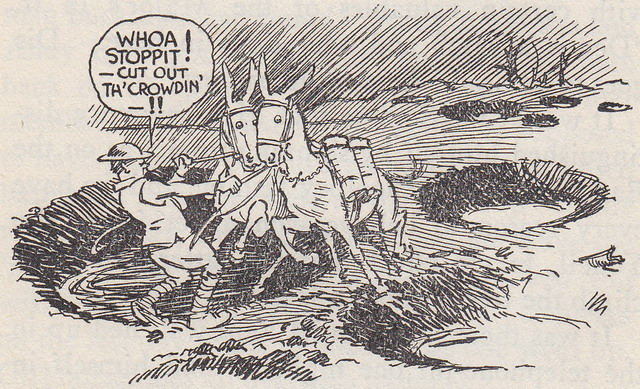
Frise illustration from Battery Action! (1919) by Hugh R. Kay, George Magee, and F. A. MacLennan

Canadian Field Artillery's 43rd Battery approached Frise in 1919 to illustrate a book on the history of their unit. The volume appeared later in the year under the title Battery Action!, written by Hugh R. Kay, George Magee, and F. A. MacLennan and illustrated with Frise's light-hearted, humorous cartoons rendered in accurate detail. (Note: The sketches were reprinted in 1972 in a volume entitled The First Great War As Seen By Jimmy Frise.)

As the Star Weekly's circulation grew, so did its comics section. Cranston encouraged Frise to create a Canada-themed comic strip in the vein of W.E. Hill's Among Us Mortals, a Chicago strip which also ran in the Star. Frise protested he could not keep up with a weekly schedule but nonetheless began At the Rink, which débuted 25 January 1919; it became Life's Little Comedies on 15 March. The strip proved popular and evolved by 1923; it had taken on the influence of John T. McCutcheon's depictions of a fictional rural town in the American Midwest called Bird Center. Frise turned his focus to humorous and nostalgic depictions of rural life and on 12 December 1925 renamed his strip Birdseye Center, whose setting he described as "any Canadian village"; its lead characters included bowler-hatted Pigskin Peters, Old Archie and his pet moose Foghorn, and lazy Eli Doolittle and his wife Ruby. The strip grew in popularity and in 1926 was voted favourite comic strip in a readers' poll—as a write-in, since the strip did not appear in the list of options.

Birdseye Center

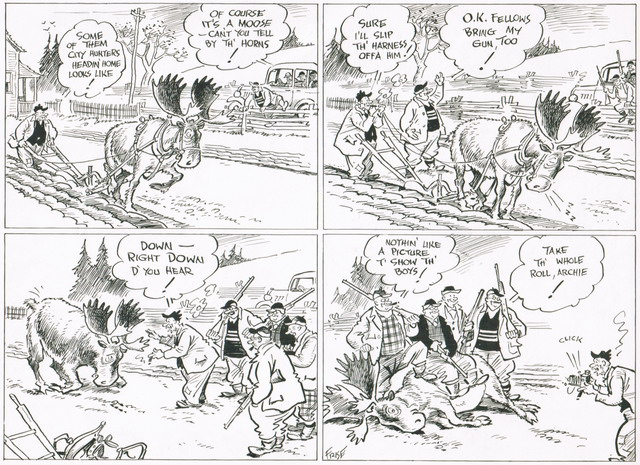

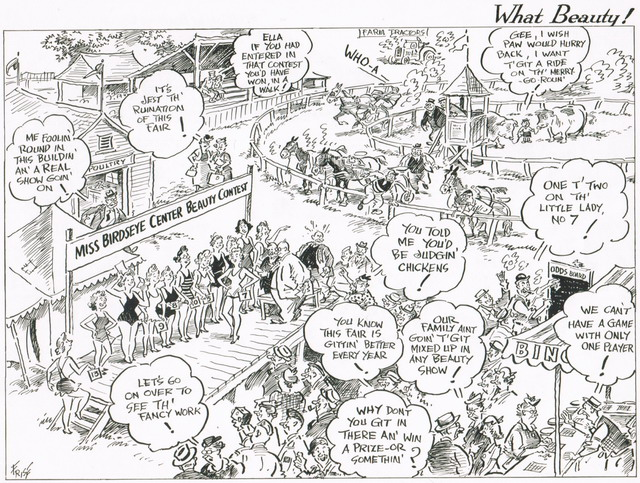

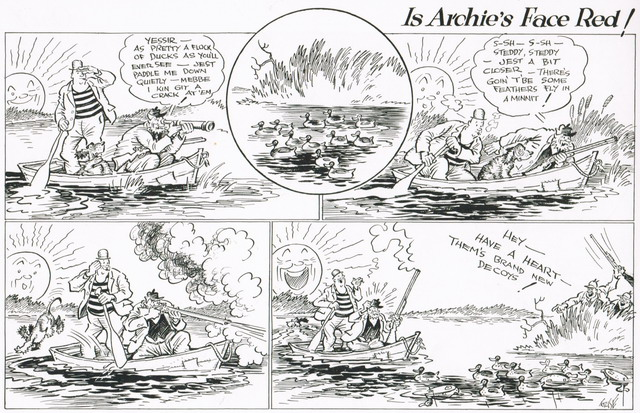

From about 1920 Frise shared an office with the journalist and Vimy Ridge veteran Greg Clark (1892–1977). They became friends, and occasionally through the 1920s, Frise would illustrate some of Clark columns, interviews and stories.

Frise chatted with the frequent visitors to the office. He worked at his own pace and often tore up work-in-progress in dissatisfaction and submitted his strips at the last moment. Frise's tardiness caused such delays in production and distribution that editorial director Harry C. Hindmarsh once demanded Joseph E. Atkinson have something done about it. Atkinson replied, "Harry, The Star Weekly does not go to press without Mr. Frise."

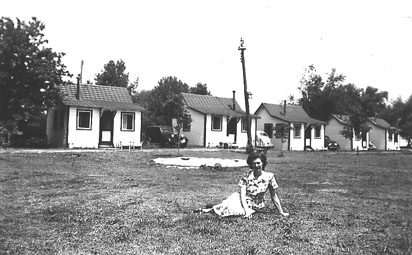
Licensing included the Birdseye Center Cabin Park on Lake Scugog.

Frise was unconcerned with the resale value of his original artwork and pursued little licensing of his work, amongst which included product endorsements, products such as jigsaw puzzles, and a Birdseye Center Cabin Park on Lake Scugog, opened in 1940. His work provided him well enough that he bought a home in the well-to-do Baby Point neighbourhood.

Beginning in 1932, Clark started penning a regular weekly humorous story in the Star Weekly—these were always illustrated by Frise. The stories generally detailed various adventures (and misadventures) best friends Greg and Jim got up to, sometimes at their homes, but also on fishing or camping trips, or exploring the backwoods and rural areas of Ontario. Frise (in real life about 5'9") was drawn as tall and gangly, and Clark short and stout. This extremely popular feature ran for the next 16 years, making Frise well known throughout Canada not just as an artist, but as a continuing real-life personality in Clark's stories. A selection of stories appeared in a volume titled Which We Did in 1936; a follow-up volume called So What was issued in 1937. Frise talked of their blunderings to the Star: "We've fried eggs on the city hall steps. We caulked my house and flooded the parlor with cement. I once let Greg persuade me to get a steam shovel to do my spring digging and ruined my garden. Perhaps this book is our most foolish adventure."

The Clark/Frise partnership was interrupted during WWII, when Clark returned to Europe as a war correspondent. Frise continued his work as a cartoonist and illustrator, and upon Clark's return, the "Greg and Jim" stories picked up where they left off. However, Frise and Clark had grown concerned with the Star's treatment of its staff, and made an agreement in 1946 to leave the paper the first opportunity. Clark contacted John McConnell, publisher of the Montreal Standard, a newspaper with a smaller circulation than the Star's that had earlier offered him a position. McConnell offered the pair salaries similar to what they received at the Star, as well as the opportunity for Frise to have his strip syndicated in the United States, which would supplement his income. When they handed in their resignations that Christmas Eve 1946, Hindmarsh asked them, "Aren't you going to give us a chance to bid?" Frise told him, "Mr. Hindmarsh, you have nothing to bid with." The last Birdseye Center episode ran on 1 February 1947.

The Star maintained publication rights to Birdseye Center, so Frise re-created the feature as Juniper Junction with strongly similar characters and situations. It débuted 22 February 1947, and the Standard ran it in colour, as Frise had long wanted. Standard's circulation grew after the addition of Frise and Clark's collaborations. Frise also provided the illustrations to Jack Hambleton's cookbook Skillet Skills for Camp and Cottage published in 1947.

After feeling unwell the night before, Frise died of a heart attack in his home in Toronto on 13 June 1948, at age 57. Clark telephoned Cranston on hearing the news, saying, "A great gentleman has passed on." Frise was buried at Prospect Cemetery in Toronto.

Jimmy Frise

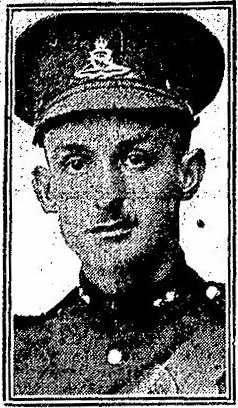
Frise in 1917 during his service in World War I

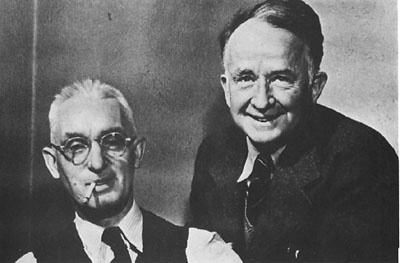
Frise (left) with friend and collaborator, journalist Greg Clark

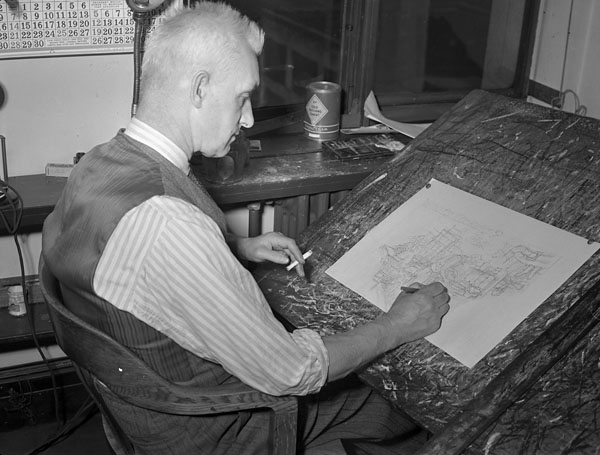
Frise in 1943

== Personal life ==
Frise stood 5 feet 9 inches (175 cm). He enjoyed the outdoors and pursued fishing and hunting. He often returned to the Lake Scugog area and sometimes spoke about his career there. He was a Methodist Christian.

After returning from his service in World War I, Frise began courting Ruth Elizabeth Gate, who had been born in the US and grew up in Toronto. She worked at an advertising agency, and co-published with her father a magazine in braille and a braille bible. She married Frise on 21 February 1918 and the couple had four daughters, Jean, Ruth, Edythe, and Betty; and a son, John. Frise often featured his spaniel Rusty in his strips.

== Legacy ==
The Montreal cartoonist Doug Wright (1917–83) took the reins of Juniper Junction, which went on to become English Canada's longest-running comic strip. In 1965 the Canadian publisher McClelland & Stewart printed a treasury of Birdseye Center with commentary by Greg Clark and an introduction by Gordon Sinclair. Clark continued publishing his tales for a time with illustrations by Duncan Macpherson (1924–93), but soon moved on to different topics.

Scugog Shores Museum in Port Perry holds some samples of Frise's original artwork, and the Province of Ontario erected an Ontario Historical Plaque in front of the museum to commemorate Frise's role in Ontario's heritage. In 2009, Frise was inducted into the Canadian Cartoonist Hall of Fame.

== Works cited ==
- Barker, Kenneth S. (May 1997). "An Introduction to the Canadian Newspaper Comic". Inks. 4 (2): 18–25. ISSN 1071-9156.
- Bell, John (2006). Invaders from the North: How Canada Conquered the Comic Book Universe. Dundurn Press. ISBN 978-1-55002-659-7.
- The Canadian Press (14 June 1948). "Jimmy Frise Dies at Toronto". Ottawa Citizen. p. 16.
- Driver, Elizabeth (2008). "Skillet skills for camp and cottage". Culinary Landmarks: A Bibliography of Canadian Cookbooks, 1825-1949. University of Toronto Press. p. 901. ISBN 978-0-8020-4790-8.
- Leroux, Marc (2010). "Gunner James Llewellyn Frise". Canadian Great War Project. Archived from the original on 27 May 2012.
- Montreal Gazette staff (19 December 1936). "Greg and Jimmy". Montreal Gazette. Vol. 165, no. 304. p. 20.
- Ottawa Citizen staff (27 November 1965). "Book notes and comments". Ottawa Citizen. p. 11.
- Plummer, Kevin (2 June 2012). "Historicist: From Lake Scugog to Vimy Ridge: Part one of a two-part look at cartoonist Jimmie Frise's life and work". Torontoist. Archived from the original on 13 April 2015.
- Plummer, Kevin (16 June 2012). "Historicist: Country Boy and Urbanite: Part two of a two-part look at cartoonist Jimmie Frise's life and work". Torontoist. Archived from the original on 12 June 2015.
- Scugog Heritage staff. "Birdseye Center Cabin Park on Lake Scugog". Archived from the original on 22 July 2014.
