= Judy MacDonald =

Canadian writer and journalist

Judy MacDonald (born 1964) is a Canadian writer and journalist, who has been associated with the online magazine Rabble (for which she served as editor-in-chief) and news programs for CBC Television, including The National, counterSpin and Face Off.

In 1999 she published the novel Jane, which was shortlisted for the 1999 Writers' Trust Fiction Prize. She followed up in 2001 with the short story collection Grey: Stories for Grown-Ups.

She has also been a backing vocalist on albums by The Hidden Cameras.

== Books ==
- Jane (1999) (ISBN 1-55152-064-8)
- Grey: Stories for Grown-Ups (2001)
