= Sylvia Nickerson =

Canadian comic book writer

- Occupations: writer, professor
- Known for: Creation (graphic novel)

Sylvia Nickerson (she/her) is a Canadian comic book writer. In May 2020 Nickerson received The Nipper, one of the Doug Wright Awards for comic book artists, for her work Creation. Creation's themes include the changes she underwent when she became a mother, and how the works of artist helped shape the gentrification of her home town. She is currently an assistant professor and adjunct professor at the University of Toronto and McMaster University, respectively.

Nickerson, a resident of Hamilton, Ontario, was interviewed by the McMaster Silhouette on February 2, 2017 and by the Hamilton Spectator, on April 4, 2019.
