= Skim (graphic novel) =

Canadian graphic novel written by Mariko Tamaki

- Cover of the first edition of Skim.
- Date: 2008
- Publisher: Groundwood Books

Creative team
- Writers: Mariko Tamaki
- Artists: Jillian Tamaki

Original publication
- Language: English
- ISBN: 978-0-88899-753-1

Skim is a Canadian graphic novel written by Mariko Tamaki and drawn by Jillian Tamaki. Set in 1993, in a Toronto Catholic girls high school, it is about an outsider girl called Skim.

== Plot ==
Skim is a "not slim" sixteen-year-old Japanese-Canadian who is a student at an all-girls Catholic school. She is known as a Goth, and practices Wicca. When popular girl Katie Matthews gets dumped by her athlete boyfriend, who days later kills himself, the entire school goes into mourning overdrive. With the school counsellors breathing down her neck and the popular clique (including Katie's best friend Julie Peters) forming a new club, Girls Celebrate Life (GCL), in its wake, Skim finds herself in the crosshairs, deepening her alienation. And if things cannot get more complicated, Skim starts to fall for an equally quirky teacher.

== Characters ==
- Kimberly Keiko Cameron, a.k.a. "Skim": a Wiccan, Gothic, Japanese-Canadian schoolgirl.
  - Katherine Farmar of The Irish Times wrote that Kim is "an unwilling outsider", "overweight, introspective, too cynical to fit in with the “normal” kids [...] but not cynical enough to maintain a veneer of cool aloofness".
  - Her ethnic background is relevant to two scenes in the comic, including an incident at Julie Peters' birthday party where Kim and another girl are kicked out of the party. Suzette Chan of Sequential Tart stated that Kim does not frequently "stake her identity" on her Japanese Canadian background.
- Lisa Soor: Skim's best friend (and fellow Wiccan), although they are beginning to drift apart.
  - Jacqueline Danziger-Russell, author of Girls and Their Comics: Finding a Female Voice in Comic Book Narrative, stated that the comic normally depicts Lisa as "a rude and selfish girl". Kim does not tell Lisa about her feelings for Ms. Archer, and the girls drift apart. Marni Stanley, author of "Unbalanced on the Brink: Adolescent Girls and the Discovery of the Self in Skim and This One Summer by Mariko Tamaki and Jillian Tamaki," stated that Lisa "is not very nice to [Kim]." In the conclusion the girls are not as close friends as they were but still are friends; Lisa finds her first love even though she previously does not believe in love.
- Ms. Archer: The school's English and drama teacher, also the only teacher at the school that Skim respects, although she is flaky.
  - Ms. Archer gives a lot of attention to Kim, who is infatuated with her; Danziger-Russell stated that the attention is "unhealthy". Kim and Ms. Archer kiss, but Ms. Archer leaves the school afterwards, causing Kim to perceive abandonment. Danzinger-Russell stated that after Ms. Archer ends their relationship, Kim "feels a confused mixture of rage, sadness, and self-pity."
  - Ms. Archer lives on Deneuve Street, a reference to Catherine Deneuve.
- Katie Matthews: a popular girl at the school, the former girlfriend of John and former best friend of Julie. She later befriends Skim, becoming closer after she defends Katie during the dance. Katie becomes estranged from the GCL girls. Danziger-Russell wrote that Katie "turns out to be a deceptively deep and respectful friend, the type of friend that Lisa never was." Katie appears on the final page in the area where Kim previously develops her relationship with Ms. Archer. Danziger-Russell stated it is up to the reader to determine whether Katie and Kim become romantically involved.
- John Reddear: Katie's former boyfriend. A star volleyball player at a neighboring boys' school. After dumping Katie, he kills himself by overdosing on his mother's heart medication. He is rumored to be gay.
  - Stanley stated that the purpose of the rumors is to show Kim's classmates' low opinion of homosexuality; according to Stanley the story is not definitive on John's sexuality but the veracity of the rumors is immaterial to the story.
- Julie Peters: Another popular girl, Katie's best friend (at first) and founder/president of the GCL Club. Skim later confronts her for what she really is: "a know-it-all pain in the butt".
  - John A. Lent described her in the International Journal of Comic Art as Skim's school's "authoritative teen drama queen" who determines the "touchy-feely" tone there.
- Anna Canard: Another GCL Club member, whom Lisa associates with more as the story progresses. She's a big-mouthed, boy-crazy gossip, although Katie thinks (as to Skim) that she is promiscuous and has the cold sores to prove it.

== Development ==
Skim was originally thought of as a "gothic Lolita story", and what eventually became part I of the story was run as a 30-page preview in an indie magazine. Mariko Tamaki wrote the story much like a play's script, and Jillian Tamaki illustrated the novel as she saw fit.

== Art style ==
The splash pages usually have Kim's diary entries rather than speech bubbles as the narrative vehicle.

Jillian Tamaki stated that she was influenced more by ukiyo-e than she initially believed.

== Reception ==
Reception was positive. In their review, Publishers Weekly called Skim an "auspicious graphic novel debut" with a "fine ear for dialogue" that is "rich in visuals and observations". Paul Gravett called it "the most sophisticated and sensitive North American graphic novel debut of the year." In Kliatt it said that the narrative manages to avoid the usual cliches of a coming of age story. The Suzanne Alyssa Andrew of Toronto Star compared the story to Dead Poets Society and Heathers. Elizabeth Spires of The New York Times wrote that it "deepens with successive rereadings."

The Cooperative Children’s Book Center recommended Skim for ages 14 and up, saying that Skim's struggles have universal qualities. The Metro News praised that the narrative voice sounds authentic.

Skim was listed as one of the Young Adult Library Services Association's 2009 Great Graphic Novels for Teens award. Skim also won the 2008 Ignatz Award for Outstanding Graphic Novel.

Skim was nominated in four categories in the 2009 Eisner Awards and won Best Book at the 2009 Doug Wright Awards.

Skim was a finalist for the 2008 Governor General's Awards in the children's literature category. The Canada Council for the Arts, the award program's administrator, faced some criticism around the fact that the nomination was credited to Mariko Tamaki, who wrote the graphic novel's text, but not to her cousin and co-creator Jillian Tamaki, who drew the illustrations. Jillian later said she was "extremely disappointed" that she had not been included in the nomination. Two prominent Canadian graphic novelists, Seth and Chester Brown, circulated an open letter to the Canada Council asking them to revise the nomination, arguing that unlike a more traditional illustrated book, a graphic novel's text and illustration are inseparable parts of the work's narrative, and that both women should accordingly be credited as equal co-authors. Their letter was also endorsed by other prominent Canadian and American graphic novelists, including Lynda Barry, Dan Clowes, Art Spiegelman, Chris Ware and Julie Doucet, as well as by Chris Oliveros of Canadian comic and graphic novel publisher Drawn & Quarterly, and Peter Birkemore of Toronto comic store The Beguiling. Melanie Rutledge, a spokesperson for the Canada Council, responded that it was too late to revise the nominations for the 2008 awards, but that the council would take the feedback into account in the future.

Later, both Jillian and Mariko Tamaki applied for and received grants from the Canada Council for the Arts to launch Skim in Spain.

In 2023, the book was banned in Clay County District Schools, Florida.
