= Patrick J. Kyle =

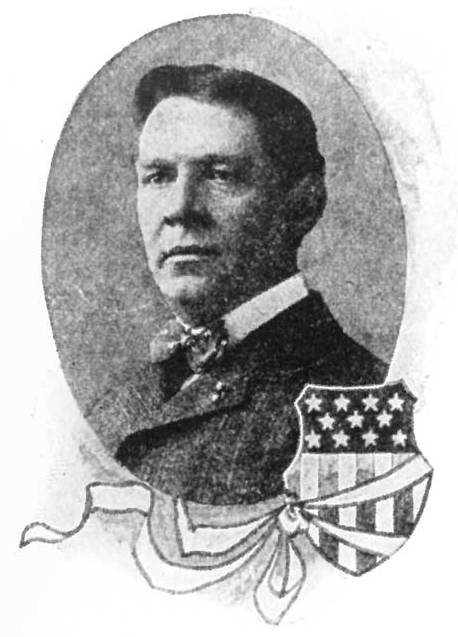
- Landsman Patrick J. Kyle
- Born: November 4, 1854; Ireland
- Died: October 28, 1929 (aged 74); Charlestown, Massachusetts, US
- Burial place: New Calvary Cemetery, Mattapan, Massachusetts, US
- Military career
- Allegiance: United States
- Branch: United States Navy
- Rank: Landsman
- Unit: USS Quinnebaug
- Awards: Medal of Honor

Patrick J. Kyle (November 4, 1854 – October 28, 1929) was a United States Navy sailor and a recipient of America's highest military decoration—the Medal of Honor

He enlisted in the U.S. Navy from Massachusetts and, while serving as a crewmember of USS Quinnebaug, saved a shipmate from drowning at Mahón, Menorca, Spain on March 13, 1879. For his conduct on this occasion, he was awarded the Medal of Honor.

Kyle died at age 74, and was interred in New Calvary Cemetery, Mattapan, Massachusetts.

== Medal of Honor citation ==
Rank and organization: Landsman, U.S. Navy. Born: 1855, Ireland. Accredited to: Massachusetts.

Citation:

For rescuing from drowning a shipmate from the U.S.S. Quinnebaug, at Port Mahon, Menorca, 13 March 1879.

== See also ==
- List of Medal of Honor recipients
- List of Medal of Honor recipients in non-combat incidents
