= Nina Bunjevac =

Serbian-Canadian cartoonist

- Born: 1973 (age 52–53); Welland, Ontario, Canada
- Occupation: Cartoonist
- Known for: Fatherland (graphic novel)

Nina Bunjevac (born 1973) is a Serbian Canadian cartoonist.

== Biography ==
Bunjevac was born in Welland, Ontario, Canada, in 1973 to Serbian immigrant parents from Yugoslavia. At age two her mother moved with her two daughters back to Zemun in Yugoslavia to get away from her radical Serbian nationalist husband Peter who would later accidentally die in Toronto in 1977 while building a bomb. Radivoje "Raymond" Panić and Pavao "Pavle" Kljaić were also killed when the bomb exploded.

Bunjevac attended the Djordje Krstic School for Applied Arts in Niš. She returned to Toronto in 1990 where she attended the Central Technical School and graduated from OCAD in 1997. She worked as a painter, illustrator, and art teacher before turning to comics in pen and ink. Her comics have appeared in a number of international comics publications. She won The Golden Pen of Belgrade at the 11th International Biennale of Illustration in Belgrade for her cover to the anthology Ženski strip na Balkanu ("Balkan Women in Comics"), which appeared in English in 2012 under the title Balkan Comics: Women on the Fringe.

Bunjevac's first collection of comics, Heartless, appeared in 2012. It won a Doug Wright Spotlight Award at the 2013 Doug Wright Awards. She followed with the memoir Fatherland in 2014, which won the 2015 Doug Wright Award for Best Book. Nina’s third book, Bezimena, made the official selection at Angoulême International Comics Festival 2019, won Artemisia prize in the category of Best Drawing in France, and was awarded Best Book Jury Prize at 2019 Lucca Comics and Games in Lucca, Italy.

== List of works ==
- Heartless (2012)
- Fatherland (2014)
- Bezimena (2018)
