= Doug Wright (cartoonist) =

Canadian cartoonist (1917–1983)

- Born: Douglas Austin Wright; August 11, 1917 Dover, Kent, England
- Died: January 3, 1983 (aged 65) Burlington, Ontario, Canada
- Area: Cartoonist
- Notable works: Doug Wright's Family (1949–1980)

Douglas Austin Wright (August 11, 1917 – January 3, 1983) was a Canadian cartoonist, best known for his weekly comic strip Doug Wright's Family (1949–1980; also known as Nipper) . The Doug Wright Awards are named after him to honour excellence in Canadian cartooning.

== Biography ==
After emigrating to Canada in 1938, Wright worked as an illustrator at an insurance company before serving in the Royal Canadian Air Force during World War Two. It was here that his cartoons of fellow servicemen first drew the eye of a magazine editor. After freelancing in Montreal for a few years after the war, Wright took over Juniper Junction in 1948 after its creator, Jimmy Frise, died suddenly. Within a year, Wright launched a wordless and untitled gag strip about a little boy for the Montreal Standard (called The Weekend magazine after 1951). Eventually entitled Nipper, the strip switched to The Canadian, another national weekly newspaper supplement, in 1967 and the name was changed to Doug Wright's Family. Wright suffered a stroke in March 1980, and had another stroke on January 3, 1983. He died the next day in hospital at the age of 65.

Nipper was a wordless masterpiece, capturing suburban Canadian life with wit and a keen eye, and ran uninterrupted for more than three decades. Wright also drew several other strips, including Max & Mini, Cynthia and The Wheels, and a series of editorial cartoons which were collected during the seventies.

Wright moved from Montreal to Burlington, Ontario in 1966.

He was married to Phyllis Sanford, and had three sons: William (1953–2020), James and Kenneth.

In 2005, the Doug Wright Awards, named in Wright's honour, recognizing Canadian cartoonists and graphic novelists, were founded. Wright himself was amongst the inaugural inductees into the Canadian Cartoonist Hall of Fame (also known as Giants of the North).

In Spring 2009, Drawn & Quarterly Books published the first volume of a retrospective of Wright's life and career. Designed and compiled by Guelph, Ontario-based cartoonist Seth, the project (Doug Wright: Canada's Master Cartoonist) contains a biographical essay on Wright, and is the first book-length study of the prolific artist. They also published strip reprints of Nipper, starting in 2011. Three volumes have been published covering 1963–1964, 1965–1966 and 1967–1968.

== Bibliography ==
=== Collected editions ===
- Seth; Mackay, Brad, eds. (2009). The collected Doug Wright : Canada's master cartoonist. Vol. 1. designed by Seth, introduction by Lynn Johnston. Montreal: Drawn & Quarterly. p. 240. ISBN 978-1-897299-52-4.
  - Volume Two (TBA)
- Doug Wright's Nipper : from the comic strip "Doug Wright's family", 1963-1964. Montreal: Drawn & Quarterly. 2010. p. 112. ISBN 978-1-77046-019-5.
- Doug Wright's Nipper : from the comic strip "Doug Wright's family", 1965-1966. Montreal: Drawn & Quarterly. 2011. p. 112. ISBN 978-1-77046-056-0.
- Doug Wright's Nipper : from the comic strip "Doug Wright's family", 1967-1968. Montreal: Drawn & Quarterly. 2012. p. 112. ISBN 978-1-77046-093-5.

== See also ==
- Canadian comics
