= Koyama Press =

Canadian comics publishing company

- Status: Defunct
- Founded: 2007
- Founder: Anne Koyama
- Country of origin: Canada
- Headquarters location: Toronto, Ontario
- Distribution: Consortium Book Sales and Distribution (books); ComiXology, Sequential (digital); Spit and a Half (comix)
- Key people: Anne Koyama, Publisher/Owner
- Publication types: Comics
- Official website: koyamapress.com

Koyama Press was a comics publishing company founded in 2007 by Annie Koyama and based in Toronto, Canada. Since its establishment in 2007, Koyama Press sought to promote and provide support to an array of emerging and established artists, including Michael DeForge, Jesse Jacobs, Rokudenashiko, and Julia Wertz. Koyama Press funded and produced a diverse collection of publications and artist's projects, including comics, art books, exhibitions, prints, and zines. In 2018, Koyama Press announced its intent to cease operations in 2021.

== Recognition ==
Koyama Press won the Joe Shuster Award for Outstanding Comic Book Publisher in 2011.

== See also ==
- Canadian comics
- Drawn & Quarterly
