= Conundrum Press (Canada) =

Canadian book publishing company

- Industry: Publishing
- Founded: 1996; 30 years ago in Montreal, Canada
- Founder: Andy Brown
- Headquarters: Wolfville, Nova Scotia, Canada
- Website: conundrumpress.com

Conundrum Press is a book publishing company located in Wolfville, Canada. It was founded in 1996 by Andy Brown.

== Affiliated authors ==
Conundrum publishes fiction, cultural history, graphic novels, spoken word and artist projects. Conundrum authors include Dana Bath, Marc Bell, Elisabeth Belliveau, Lance Blomgren, Shary Boyle, Howard Chackowicz, Joey Dubuc, Meags Fitzgerald, Golda Fried, Corey Frost, Philippe Girard, Lesley Johnson, Valerie Joy Kalynchuk, Liane Keightley, Catherine Kidd, Julian Lawrence, Suki Lee, Amanda Marchand, Billy Mavreas, Chandra Mayor, Maya Merrick, Nathaniel G. Moore, Marc Ngui, Cole Pauls, Stéphane Olivier, Joe Ollmann, Meg Sircom, Victoria Stanton, Julia Tausch, Marc Tessier, Vincent Tinguely, Dakota McFadzean, David Collier, Henriette Vslium, Alex Fellows, Michel Rabagliati, Zach Worton, Sarah Burwash, Shary Boyle, Jillian Tamaki, Robert Allen, Sean Karemaker, and Rebecca Roher.

== History ==
The release of Catherine Kidd's early works, such as everything I know about love I learned from taxidermy in 1996, was successful for the company, allowing them to expand and publish more of Kidd's works and works from other authors.

In 2006, for the ten-year anniversary of the company, Brown commissioned new work from all the people he has published through the decade to include in a book called The Portable Conundrum. The release of the anthology included a large party with all of the contributing authors attending and special readings from the authors' individual works.

In 2016, Conundrum released 20x20, an anthology celebrating 20 years of independent culture. The mandate of Conundrum Press has shifted to literary graphic novels.
