= 33rd Lambda Literary Awards =

2021 literary awards ceremony

The 33rd Lambda Literary Awards were announced on June 1, 2021, to honour works of LGBT literature published in 2020. Due to the COVID-19 pandemic in the United States, there was no public ceremony; instead, the winners were announced in a livestreamed virtual gala.

Nominees were announced in March 2021.

== Special awards ==
Category	Winner
Jeanne Córdova Prize for Lesbian/Queer Nonfiction	Nancy Agabian
Jim Duggins Outstanding Mid-Career Novelists' Prize	Sarah Gerard, Brontez Purnell
Judith A. Markowitz Emerging Writer Award	Taylor Johnson, T Kira Madden
Randall Kenan Prize for Black LGBTQ Fiction	Ana-Maurine Lara

== Nominees and winners ==
Category	Winner	Nominated
Bisexual Fiction	Zaina Arafat, You Exist Too Much	Elisabeth Thomas. Catherine House; C Pam Zhang, How Much of These Hills Is Gold; Sulaiman Addonia, Silence Is My Mother Tongue; Talia Hibbert, Take a Hint, Dani Brown
Bisexual Nonfiction	Samantha Irby, Wow, No Thank You.: Essays	Natasha Sajé, Terroir: Love, Out of Place; Emma Copley Eisenberg, The Third Rainbow Girl: The Long Life of a Double Murder in Appalachia; Shayla Lawson, This Is Major: Notes of Diana Ross, Dark Girls, and Being Dope; Alden Jones, The Wanting Was a Wilderness: Cheryl Strayed's Wild and the Art of Memoir
Bisexual Poetry	Aricka Foreman, Salt Body Shimmer	George Abraham, Birthright; Meghan Privitello, One God at a Time; Jody Chan, sick; S*an D. Henry-Smith, Wild Peach
Gay Fiction	Joon Oluchi Lee, Neotenica	Garth Greenwell, Cleanness; Brandon Taylor, Real Life; Douglas Stuart, Shuggie Bain; Dennis E. Staples, This Town Sleeps
Gay Memoir/Biography	Mohsin Zaidi, A Dutiful Boy: A Memoir of a Gay Muslim's Journey to Acceptance	R. Eric Thomas, Here For It: Or, How to Save Your Soul in America; Billy-Ray Belcourt, A History of My Brief Body; John Birdsall, The Man Who Ate Too Much: The Life of James Beard; François Clemmons, Officer Clemmons: A Memoir
Gay Poetry	Eduardo C. Corral, Guillotine	Tommye Blount, Fantasia for the Man in Blue; Justin Phillip Reed, The Malevolent Volume; Romeo Oriogun, Sacrament of Bodies; Ted Rees, Thanksgiving: A Poem
Gay Romance	Felice Stevens, The Ghost and Charlie Muir	Adriana Herrera, Finding Joy; Lance Ringel, Flower of Iowa; Erin Colleen McRae and Racheline Maltese, Ink and Ice; Cat Sebastian, Two Rogues Make a Right
Lesbian Fiction	Juli Delgado Lopera, Fiebre Tropical	K-Ming Chang, Bestiary; Francesca Ekwuyasi, Butter Honey Pig Bread; Jennifer Steil, Exile Music; Jean Kyoung Frazier, Pizza Girl
Lesbian Memoir/Biography	Jenn Shapland, My Autobiography of Carson McCullers	Tania De Rozario, And The Walls Come Crumbling Down; Lori Soderlind, The Change: My Great American, Postindustrial, Midlife Crisis Tour; Tana Wojczuk, Lady Romeo: The Radical and Revolutionary Life of Charlotte Cushman, America's First Celebrity; Nina Kennedy, Practicing for Love: A Memoir
Lesbian Poetry	Pamela Sneed, Funeral Diva	Roya Marsh, dayliGht; Sarah M. Sala, Devil's Lake; Mary Jean Chan, Flèche; Kimberly Alidio, : once teeth bones coral :
Lesbian Romance	Alexandria Bellefleur, Written in the Stars	Clare Ashton, Finding Jessica Lambert; Anna Burke, Nottingham; Ali Vali, One More Chance; Jae, Wrong Number, Right Woman
LGBTQ Anthology	Joshua Whitehead, Love After the End: An Anthology of Two-Spirit and Indigiqueer Speculative Fiction	Ejeris Dixon and Leah Lakshmi Piepzna-Samarasinha, Beyond Survival: Strategies and Stories from the Transformative Justice Movement; Dave Ring, Glitter + Ashes: Queer Tales of a World That Wouldn't Die; Jos Twist, Ben Vincent, Meg-John Barker and Kat Gupta, Non-Binary Lives: An Anthology of Intersecting Identities; Andrea Abi-Karam and Kay Gabriel, We Want It All: An Anthology of Radical Trans Poetics
LGBTQ Children's/Middle Grade	Kacen Callender, King and the Dragonflies	Niki Smith, The Deep & Dark Blue; Vincent X. Kirsch, From Archie to Zack; Phil Bildner, A High Five for Glenn Burke; Peter Mercurio, Our Subway Baby
LGBTQ Drama	Yilong Liu, The Book of Mountains and Seas	Jacqueline Goldfinger, Babel; Liza Birkenmeier and Jill Sobule, F*ck7thGrade; Sarah Einspanier, House Plant; R. Eric Thomas, Safe Space
LGBTQ Erotica	Lena Suksi, The Nerves	Sinclair Sexsmith, Best Lesbian Erotica of the Year, Volume 5; Anne Shade, Femme Tales; Andrea Purcell, Smut Peddler Presents: Silver; Kel Hardy, Tianna Henry and MJ Lyons, Smut Peddlers: Glad Day 50
LGBTQ Comics	Bishakh Som, Apsara Engine	Sophie Yanow, The Contradictions; Yao Xiao, Everything Is Beautiful, and I'm Not Afraid: A Baopu Collection; Tina Horn, Laurenn McCubbin, Jen Hickman, Alejandra Gutiérrez, Michael Dowling, Steve Wands, Tula Lotay, Katie Skelly and Chris O'Halloran, SFSX (Safe Sex), Vol. 1: Protection; Bishakh Som, Spellbound: A Graphic Memoir
LGBTQ Mystery	Tom Ryan, I Hope You're Listening	A. E. Radley, Death Before Dessert; Cheryl A. Head, Find Me When I'm Lost; Stephen Spotswood, Fortune Favors the Dead; Rosalie Knecht, Vera Kelly Is Not a Mystery
LGBTQ Nonfiction	Ashon T. Crawley, The Lonely Letters	Ruth Coker Burks, All the Young Men; Gabriel Ojeda-Sagué and Erich Kessel Jr., An Excess of Quiet: Selected Sketches by Gustavo Ojeda, 1979–1989; Marty Fink, Forget Burial: HIV Kinship, Disability, and Queer/Trans Narratives of Care; Josephine Donovan, The Lexington Six: Lesbian and Gay Resistance in 1970s America
LGBTQ Science Fiction/Fantasy/Horror	Julian K. Jarboe, Everyone on the Moon is Essential Personnel	Rebecca Roanhorse, Black Sun; Zen Cho, The Order of the Pure Moon Reflected in Water; Tlotlo Tsamaase, The Silence of the Wilting Skin; Aaron A. Reed, Subcutanean
LGBTQ Studies	Zakiyyah Iman Jackson, Becoming Human: Matter and Meaning in an Antiblack World	Cait McKinney, Information Activism: A Queer History of Lesbian Media Technologies; José Esteban Muñoz, The Sense of Brown; Janet R. Jakobsen, The Sex Obsession: Perversity and Possibility in American Politics; Jane Ward, The Tragedy of Heterosexuality
LGBTQ Young Adult	Mike Curato, Flamer	Lev A. C. Rosen, Camp; Trung Le Nguyen, The Magic Fish; Agnes Borinsky, Sasha Masha; Leah Johnson, You Should See Me in a Crown
Transgender Fiction	Zeyn Joukhadar, The Thirty Names of Night	Nino Cipri, Finna; Chana Porter, The Seep; Vivek Shraya, The Subtweet; Lydia Rogue, Trans-Galactic Bike Ride: Feminist Bicycle Science Fiction Stories of Transgender and Nonbinary Adventurers
Transgender Nonfiction	J Mase III and Lady Dane Figueroa Edidi, The Black Trans Prayer Book	Meredith Talusan, Fairest: A Memoir; Mattilda Bernstein Sycamore, The Freezer Door; L Heidenreich, Nepantla Squared: Transgender Mestiz@ Histories in Times of Global Shift; Hil Malatino, Trans Care
Transgender Poetry	Sade LaNay, I Love You and I'm Not Dead	Aeon Ginsberg, Greyhound; Kay Ulanday Barrett, More Than Organs; Maxe Crandall, The Nancy Reagan Collection; Jay Besemer, Theories of Performance
