= Ignyte Award for Outstanding Comics Team =

Annual comic book award for speculative fiction

- Awarded for: Teams, including writers, artists, and letterers, which work to produce an eligible comic volume
- Country: United States
- Presented by: FIYAH Literary Magazine
- First award: 2020
- Final award: 2025
- Website: ignyteawards.fiyahlitmag.com

The Ignyte Award for Outstanding Comics Team was a literary award given annually as part of the Ignyte Awards. It was awarded annual from 2020 to 2025. The award was suspended in 2026, with the administrators saying that interest in it had flagged.

== Winners and finalists ==
* Winners

Year	Author(s)	Work	Publisher	Ref.
2020	Ram V*	These Savage Shores	Vault Comics	
2020	Sumit Kumar*	These Savage Shores	Vault Comics	
2020	Vitorio Astone*	These Savage Shores	Vault Comics	
2020	Aditya Bidikar*	These Savage Shores	Vault Comics	
2020	Tim Daniel*	These Savage Shores	Vault Comics	
2020	Sam Humphries	Blackbird Volume 1	Image Comics	
2020	Jen Bartel	Blackbird Volume 1	Image Comics	
2020	Triona Farrell	Blackbird Volume 1	Image Comics	
2020	Khary Randolph	Excellence	Image Comics	
2020	Brandon Thomas	Excellence	Image Comics	
2020	Emilio Lopez	Excellence	Image Comics	
2020	Deron Bennett	Excellence	Image Comics	
2020	Simon Spurrier	Coda	BOOM!	
2020	Matías Bergara	Coda	BOOM!	
2020	Michael Doig	Coda	BOOM!	
2020	Jim Campbell	Coda	BOOM!	
2020	Colin Bell	Coda	BOOM!	
2020	David F. Walker	Bitter Root	Image Comics	
2020	Chuck Brown	Bitter Root	Image Comics	
2020	Sanford Greene	Bitter Root	Image Comics	
2021	Octavia E. Butler (writer)*	Parable of the Sower	Abrams ComicArts	
2021	Damian Duffy (adaptor)*	Parable of the Sower	Abrams ComicArts	
2021	John Jennings (illustrator)*	Parable of the Sower	Abrams ComicArts	
2021	Zao Dao	Cuisine Chinoise: Five Tales of Food and Life	Dark Horse Comics	
2021	Diana Schutz	Cuisine Chinoise: Five Tales of Food and Life	Dark Horse Comics	
2021	Brandon Kandor	Cuisine Chinoise: Five Tales of Food and Life	Dark Horse Comics	
2021	N. K. Jemisin	Far Sector	DC Comics	
2021	Jamal Campbell	Far Sector	DC Comics	
2021	Alex Paknadel	Giga	Vault Comics	
2021	John Lê	Giga	Vault Comics	
2021	Alex Sanchez	You Brought Me the Ocean	DC Comics	
2021	Jul Maroh	You Brought Me the Ocean	DC Comics	
2022	L. L. McKinney*	Nubia: Real One	DC Comics	
2022	Robyn Smith*	Nubia: Real One	DC Comics	
2022	Saladin Ahmed	Abbott 1973	BOOM!	
2022	Sami Kivelä	Abbott 1973	BOOM!	
2022	Hiromi Goto	Shadow Life	First Second Books	
2022	Ann Xu	Shadow Life	First Second Books	
2022	Ibrahim Moustafa	Count	Humanoids, Inc.	
2022	Brad Simpson	Count	Humanoids, Inc.	
2022	Hassan Otsame-Elhaou	Count	Humanoids, Inc.	
2022	Maggie Tokuda-Hall	Squad	HarperAlley / Greenwillow	
2022	Lisa Sterle	Squad	HarperAlley / Greenwillow	
2023	Marie Enger*	Where Black Stars Rise	Tor Nightfire	
2023	Nadia Shammas*	Where Black Stars Rise	Tor Nightfire	
2023	Matteo Illuminat	Changa and the Jade Obelisk #2	MVmedia	
2023	Loris Ravina	Changa and the Jade Obelisk #2	MVmedia	
2023	Massimiliano Veltri	Changa and the Jade Obelisk #2	MVmedia	
2023	Robert Jeffrey II	Changa and the Jade Obelisk #2	MVmedia	
2023	Nadia Shammas	Squire	HarperCollins	
2023	Sara Alfageeh	Squire	HarperCollins	
2024	Ethan S. Parker*	Kill Your Darlings	Image Comics	
2024	Griffin Sheridan*	Kill Your Darlings	Image Comics	
2024	Bob Quinn*	Kill Your Darlings	Image Comics	
2024	Jasmine Walls	Brooms	Levine Querido	
2024	Teo DuVall	Brooms	Levine Querido	
2024	Bex Glendining	Brooms	Levine Querido	
2024	Ariana Maher	Brooms	Levine Querido	
2024	Ennun Ana Iurov	Whisper of the Woods	Mad Cave Studios	
2024	S. J. Miller	Mage and the Endless Unknown	Iron Circus Comics	
2024	Ginger Ly	Suee and the Strange White Light	Fanfare	
2024	Molly Park	Suee and the Strange White Light	Fanfare	
2025	Jes Wibowo*	Lunar Boy	HarperAlley	
2025	Cin Wibowo	Lunar Boy	HarperAlley	
2025	Maggie Tokuda-Hall	The Worst Ronin	HarperAlley	
2025	Faith Schaffer	The Worst Ronin	HarperAlley	
2025	Gene Luen Yang	Lunar New Year Love Story	First Second Books	
2025	LeUyen Pham	Lunar New Year Love Story	First Second Books	
