= Lambda Literary Award for LGBTQ+ Comics =

Annual literary award

The Lambda Literary Award for LGBTQ+ Comics is an annual literary award, presented by the Lambda Literary Foundation, to a graphic novel with LGBTQ+ themes. As the award is presented based on themes in the work, not the sexuality or gender of the writer, non-LGBTQ+ individuals may be nominated for or win the award.

The award is presented to "[b]ook-length works of fiction or non-fiction that use a combination of words and sequential art to convey a narrative ..., including novels, graphic memoirs and short story or comics collections by the same author/team."

Lambda Literary is one of few organizations that has recognized comics and graphic novels since the 1980s. From 2014 to 2019, the award was named the Lambda Literary Award for LGBT Graphic Novel but in 2020, it changed to the Lambda Literary Award for Comics.

== Winners and nominees ==
List of Lambda Literary Award for LGBTQ+ Comics winners and finalists
Year	Contributor(s)	Title	Result	Ref.
2014	Nicole J. Georges	Calling Dr. Laura: A Graphic Memoir	Winner	
2014	Alex Woolfson with Winona Nelson (illus.)	Artifice	Finalist	
2014	Tana Ford	Duck! Second Chances	Finalist	
2014	Vivek J. Tiwary, Andrew C. Robinson, Kyle Baker, and Steve Dutro	The Fifth Beatle: The Brian Epstein Story	Finalist	
2015	Joyce Brabner with Mark Zingarelli (illus.)	Second Avenue Caper	Winner	
2015	Elisha Lim	100 Crushes	Finalist	
2015	Kathleen Jacques	Band Vs. Band Comix Volume 1	Finalist	
2015	A.K. Summers	Pregnant Butch: Nine Long Months Spent in Drag	Finalist	
2015	Nick Sumida	Snackies	Finalist	
2016	EK Weaver	The Less Than Epic Adventures of TJ & Amal	Winner	
2016	Jeremy Sorese	Curveball	Finalist	
2016	Maggie Thrash	Honor Girl	Finalist	
2016	Blue Delliquanti	O Human Star: Volume One	Finalist	
2016	Ed Luce	Wuvable Oaf	Finalist	
2017	Ed Luce	Wuvable Oaf: Blood & Metal	Winner	
2017	Eric Liberge and Arnaud Delalande with David Homel (translator)	The Case of Alan Turing: The Extraordinary and Tragic Story of the Legendary Codebreaker	Finalist	
2017	P. Kristen Enos with Heidi Ho with Derek Chua, Leesamarie Croal, Casandra Grullon, Beth Varni, and Dan Parent (illus.)	Active Voice The Comic Collection: The Real Life Adventures Of An Asian-American, Lesbian, Feminist, Activist And Her Friends	Finalist	
2018	Emil Ferris	My Favorite Thing is Monsters	Winner	
2018	Eric Kostiuk Williams	Condo Heartbreak Disco	Finalist	
2018	Nicole J. Georges	Fetch: How a Bad Dog Brought Me Home	Finalist	
2018	Gengoroh Tagame	My Brother's Husband, Volume 1	Finalist	
2018	Tillie Walden	Spinning	Finalist	
2019	Tommi Parrish	The Lie and How We Told It	Winner	
2019	Mark Russell with Sean Parsons, Mark Morales, Howard Porter, and Mike Feehan (illus.)	Exit Stage Left: The Snagglepuss Chronicles	Finalist	
2019	Paige Braddock	Love Letters to Jane's World	Finalist	
2019	Tillie Walden	On a Sunbeam	Finalist	
2019	Eric Kostiuk Williams	Our Wretched Town Hall	Finalist	
2019	Michelle Perez with Remy Boydell (illus.)	The Pervert	Finalist	
2019	Steve MacIsaac	Unpacking	Finalist	
2019	Jeanne Thornton and Tara Madison Avery	We're Still Here: An All-Trans Comics Anthology	Finalist	
2020	Kelsey Wroten	Cannonball	Winner	
2020	Jaime Hernández	Is This How You See Me?	Finalist	
2020	Vivek Shraya	Death Threat	Finalist	
2020	Mariko Tamaki	Laura Dean Keeps Breaking Up With Me	Finalist	
2020	Tillie Walden	Are You Listening?	Finalist	
2021	Bishakh Som	Apsara Engine	Winner	
2021	Sophie Yanow	The Contradictions	Finalist	
2021	Yao Xiao and Andrews McMeel	Everything Is Beautiful, and I'm Not Afraid: A Baopu Collection	Finalist	
2021	Tina Horn, Laurenn McCubbin, Jen Hickman, Alejandra Gutiérrez, Michael Dowling, Steve Wands, Tula Lotay, Katie Skelly, Chris O'Halloran	SFSX (Safe Sex), Vol. 1: Protection	Finalist	
2021	Bishakh Som	Spellbound: A Graphic Memoir	Finalist	
2022	Lee Lai	Stone Fruit	Winner	
2022	Crystal Frasier and Val Wise with Oscar O. Jupiter (lettering)	Cheer Up! Love and Pompoms	Finalist	
2022	Syan Rose	Our Work Is Everywhere: An Illustrated Oral History of Queer & Trans Resistance	Finalist	
2022	Hiromi Goto with Ann Xu (illus.)	Shadow Life	Finalist	
2022	Kat Leyh	Thirsty Mermaids	Finalist	
2023	Sas Milledge	Mamo	Winner	
2023	Will Betke-Brunswick	A Pros and Cons List for Strong Feelings	Finalist	
2023	Gabriel Ebensperger, trans. by Kelley D. Salas	Gay Giant (es)	Finalist	
2023	Melanie Gillman	Other Ever Afters	Finalist	
2023	Sarah Winifred Searle	The Greatest Thing	Finalist	
2024	E. M. Carroll	A Guest in the House	Winner	
2024	Mari Costa	Belle of the Ball	Finalist	
2024	Lawrence Lindell	Blackward	Finalist	
2024	Jillian Tamaki and Mariko Tamaki	Roaming	Finalist	
2024	H. A.	The Chromatic Fantasy (es)	Finalist	
2025	Lonnie Garcia	Putty Pygmalion	Winner	
2025	Magdalene Visaggio with Paulina Ganucheau (illus)	Girlmode	Finalist	
2025	Tenacity Plys.	SN_33P'sCoolZine.pdf	Finalist	
2025	Sarah Leavitt	Something, Not Nothing: A Story of Grief and Love	Finalist	
2025	Viktor T. Kerney and William O. Tyler	We Belong: An All-Black/All-Queer Sci-Fi/Fantasy Comics Anthology	Finalist	
2026	Mike Curato	Gaysians	Winner	
2026	Askel Aden	Love, Misha	Finalist	
2026	Kayla E.	Precious Rubbish	Finalist	
2026	Bread Tarleton	Soften the Blow	Finalist	
2026	Alison Bechdel	Spent	Finalist	
