= J Mase III =

American poet and educator (born 1984)

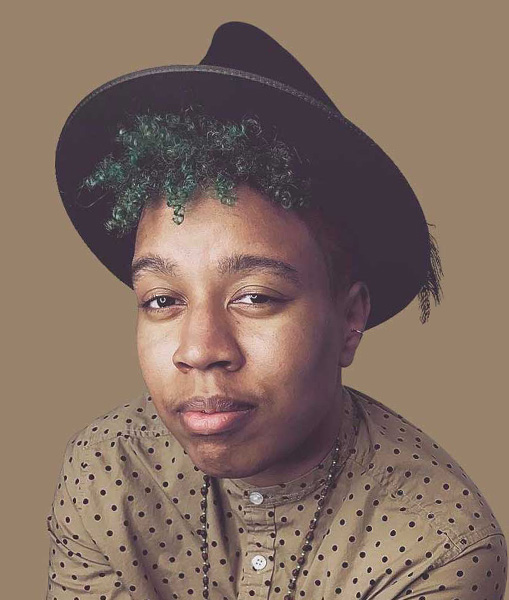
Mase in 2019

J Mase III (born May 14, 1984) is an American poet and educator.

His book The Black Trans Prayer Book won a Lambda Literary Award for Transgender Nonfiction. He also founded awQward, the first talent agency for trans and queer people of color.

== Personal life ==
Although Mase previously lived in Philadelphia, he currently resides in Seattle.

He was raised in a dual-faith household, his mother being Baptist and his father being Muslim.

== Career ==
Mase has educated LGBTQIA+ and racial justice issues in K-12 schools, universities, faith communities, and restricted care facilities in the United States, the United Kingdom, and Canada. He served as the Advisory Board Chair of the Marsha P. Johnson Institute.

As a slam poet, Mase has performed with Chuck D and the Indigo Girls. His work has been featured on MSNBC, NBC OUT, Atlanta Black Star, Upworthy, The New York Times, BuzzFeed, the Root, and Huffington Post. His poetry covers "patriarchy, white supremacy, justice, and injustices."

In 2014, he founded awQward, the first talent agency for trans and queer people of color.

Mase currently serves as the head writer for the theatrical production Black Bois.

== Publications ==
- And Then I Got Fired: One Transqueer's Reflections on Grief, Unemployment & Inappropriate Jokes About Death (2019)
- The Black Trans Prayer Book, co-edited with Lady Dane Figueroa Edidi (2020)
- White Folks Be Trippin': An Ethnography Through Poetry & Prose (2020)
