= Flamer =

Flamer could refer to:

- Flamer (novel), a 2020 graphic novel by Mike Curato
- Flame (malware)
- Faggot (slang)
- Flaming (Internet)
- flamethrower
