= The Ojja-Wojja =

2023 graphic novel by Magdalene Visaggio and Jenn St-Onge

- Page count: 192 pages
- Publisher: HarperCollins

Creative team
- Writer: Magdalene Visaggio
- Artist: Jenn St-Onge
- Letterer: Micah Myers
- Colorist: Avery Bacon (flatting assistance from Arif Kudus)

Original publication
- Date of publication: March 7, 2023
- Language: English
- ISBN: 978-0-06-285239-7

The Ojja-Wojja: A Horror Mystery or Whatever is a supernatural graphic novel written by Magdalene Visaggio and illustrated by Jenn St-Onge. It was published on March 7, 2023 by HarperCollins and follows two girls who inadvertently awaken a demonic entity called the Ojja-Wojja while doing a school project. It received positive reviews, including starred reviews from Kirkus Reviews and Booklist.

== Plot ==
Friends Valetine "Val" Malloy and Lanie Pham are considered outcasts at their school, Val for being autistic and Vietnamese-American Lanie for being a trans girl, and both for their interest in supernatural phenomena and witchcraft. When Val struggles with staying focused in class, her teacher Mr. Betancourt assigns her to research the history of the paranormal in their town Bolingbroke, hoping to harness her interests. Bringing Lanie along, Val tries to summon a spirit known as Ghost of Nickel Bridge. To their surprise the ghost actually briefly appears, with Val recording it on her phone. However, the next day Andrea, who was once friends with Lanie but turned on her when she came out, steals Val's phone and shows the video to her friends, revealing the ghost does not show up onscreen.

Later, Val encounters Persephone, an old woman known for her bizarre behavior, who repeatedly yells "Ojja-Wojja" at Val before she runs away. Val goes to the town library and asks about the Ojja-Wojja, and the librarian brings her to the archives and talks about the conspiracy of how the town's founder formed a deal with an entity known as the Ojja-Wojja to drive witches out of the town in exchange for sacrificing one child every year. Val takes a book from the archive, and discovers a ritual to summon the creature. Shortly afterwards, a strange man approaches her and Lanie and asks for directions to the library, claiming to be seeking a "dangerous" book, with the girls refusing to tell him. In the woods, Val and Lanie perform the Ojja-Wojja ritual. Nothing seems to happen, but a shadowy figure enters Andrea's house, possessing her.

The next day, the people at school behave strangely, acting coldly and obsessing over Andrea. Only Val, Lanie, and their friends and fellow outcasts Greg, Kelly, and Alan are unaffected. A school assembly is called and is revealed to be focused on worshiping Andrea. As the Ojja-Wojja-possessed Andrea sucks people's spirits out, Val, Lanie, and their friends flee. They go to Persephone's house, where they find her and the mysterious man, who reveal themselves as the last members of the Society of the Ojja-Wojja. Fifty years prior, they sealed away the Ojja-Wojja; however, the seal weakened over time, and Val and Lanie's actions helped it break free. The man tries to stab Val and Lanie to satisfy the Ojja-Wojja, but Greg attacks him and the five kids are able to escape

After a failed attempt to resummon and trap the Ojja-Wojja, Val figures that they can defeat the demon by killing Andrea, its host. The kids go into town and are attacked by possessed people whose appearances have been distorted by the Ojja-Wojja. In the chaos they manage to find the possessed Andrea, now a glowing figure with antlers. She separates Val and Lanie from the others by trapping them in another dimension. There, they encounter the Ghost of Nickel Bridge, who brings them to where the real Andrea has been imprisoned. The Ojja-Wojja confronts them, and reveals that it grew interested in humanity when they first appeared, but its inhuman nature meant it was unaware of the harm it caused or why people feared it. Seeing a way to communicate, Val tells the Ojja-Wojja a story, where it transforms into a white-haired girl with horns. The Ojja-Wojja is enthralled by Val's ability to create, seeing the fictional characters as 'pieces' of Val. Content to exist in Val's stories, the Ojja-Wojja leaves, reverting everything to how it was before the ritual, though Val is left with a white streak in her hair. With things back to normal, Andrea apologizes to Lanie for how her insecurities influenced the Ojja-Wojja. Val then wonders if anything else escaped during the summoning ritual, and Lanie and the other kids agree that if anything did, they will work together to stop it.

== Development ==
The book was first announced in 2018 and is the first in a planned series.

== Reception ==
The Ojja-Wojja was reviewed positively in Publishers Weekly, which noted the use of varying art styles during Val's imagination sequences, The Bulletin of the Center for Children's Books, and School Library Journal. It was given starred reviews by Booklist, which described it as being "generously laced with humor and empathy" and Kirkus Reviews, which compared it to Squad by Maggie Tokuda-Hall and Through the Woods by E. M. Carroll, further commenting on its character-driven focus and concluding that it was "spooky, queer, and magical." It was also included the list of Kirkus Reviews' Best Middle Grade Books of the Year for 2023.

The book was included in the 2023 edition of the Best Graphic Novels for Children by the Graphic Novels & Comics Round Table.

== See also ==
- Girlmode - graphic novel also by Magdalene Visaggio
- Bingo Love - graphic novel also illustrated by Jenn St-Onge
