= Wash Day Diaries =

2022 young adult graphic novel

- Date: July 5, 2022
- Publisher: Chronicle Books

Creative team
- Writer: Jamila Rowser
- Artist: Robyn Smith

Original publication
- Language: English
- ISBN: 9781732419001

Wash Day Diaries is a graphic novel written by Jamila Rowser and illustrated by Robyn Smith that follows four young Black women in New York. The book was published by Chronicle Books in 2022.

== Plot ==
This book follows four young African-American women. The main characters are close friends, Kim, Tanisha, Davene, and Cookie. The graphic novel is in a five short story format. Each chapter of this book shares parts of each character's life and what is going on for them socially and mentally. One of the main characters is in a love triangle and during wash day they all discuss the challenge of trying to choose between two possible boys to date. The authors take care to acknowledge and portray the Black sisterhood between the four girls. The experiences told by the authors are deeply personal experiences with Black hair care. The main characters form a self-care regimen during multiple hours-long hair appointments.

== Background ==
The authors of Wash Day Diaries, Jamila Rowser and Robyn Smith wanted to depict the importance of Black hair in African-American culture. They wanted a relatable age for a wide range of readers as well as a story that would be interesting to all readers. The authors wanted to discuss aspects African-American hair culture, such as "wash day". Hair is a large part of African-American culture; washing hair and styling takes long amounts of time and is often a quality time in families and communities.

== Authors ==
Jamila Rowser writes comic books about embracing African-American culture. She wrote Wash Day Diaries and Wobbledy 3000. Rowser is a queer Black, Puerto Rican, and Dominican writer, editor, and publisher. She lives in Miami and has spent time living in the Bronx, New York.

Robyn Smith has written and illustrated many graphic novels including, Wash Day Diaries, Nubia: Real One, Chemical Process Design and Integration, The Saddest Angriest Black Girl in Town, Horse Life: The Ultimate Guide to Caring for and Riding Horses for Kids, and The Big Activity Book for Couples. Smith is a Jamaican cartoonist and graphic novel artist from New York.

== Reception ==
Wash Day Diaries received a starred review from Publishers Weekly.

== Accolades ==
- NYPL's Best Books of 2022
- Best Queer Books of 2022, Autostraddle
- 2023 Alex Award Winner, YALSA/ALA
- 2023 Los Angeles Times Book Prize for Graphic Novel/Comics
- 2023 Ignatz Award for Outstanding Story

== Publication ==
- Rowser, Jamila; Smith, Robyn (2022). Wash Day Diaries. Chronicle Books. ISBN 9781732419001.
