= Girlmode =

2024 graphic novel by Magdalene Visaggio and Paulina Ganucheau

- Page count: 224 pages
- Publisher: HarperCollins

Creative team
- Writer: Magdalene Visaggio
- Artist: Paulina Ganucheau

Original publication
- Date of publication: October 2024
- Language: English
- ISBN: 978-0-063-06066-1

Girlmode is a graphic novel by author Magdalene Visaggio and illustrator Paulina Ganucheau. It received several starred reviews and was a finalist for the 2025 Lambda Literary Award for LGBTQ+ Comics.

== Plot ==
The protagonist, Phoebe Zito, moves with her dad to L.A. in her search for a fresh start in high school. She is a geeky, white, trans 16-year-old girl. She first becomes friends with Ben Wheelock, a geeky outcast at her new school. Phoebe's social life changes when Mackenzie Ishikawa, a popular girl at school, decides to befriend Phoebe and give her a makeover, as well as teach her how she should be a girl.

Phoebe goes on dates with Ben and Ethan Rackley, but finds that Ethan has rigid beliefs about appropriate gender roles and Ben is uncomfortably focused on her transness. Phoebe gradually realizes that her classmates all want her to be someone that she is not, and tries to instead figure out who she wants to be for herself. At the same time, Mackenzie gets a role as Audrey in Little Shop of Horrors, and learns about herself via relating to the character's struggles. Mackenzie and Phoebe start to become actual friends as they address their personal challenges and mature.

== Creation ==
The storyline in Girlmode was initially inspired by Clueless, which Magdalene Visaggio had lately interpreted as an essentially trans movie. She wanted to prioritize the character of Tai in a new work, and expand on the film's sardonic critique of Cher's meddling with Tai's personal expression. Visaggio especially wanted to see how both girls could break away from the constrictive gender expectations that they initially try to fit into.

Visaggio wanted Phoebe's character to be grounded primarily in her identity as a girl, while not ignoring Phoebe's trans identity. The author had previously debated whether and how to write trans characters, especially given the constraints she said she had seen the publishing industry put on trans writers and works. Visaggio decided to focus this novel on exploring the similarities between cis and trans girls. She wanted the book to speak to all girls: cis and trans, out and closeted.

== Reception ==
Girlmode was a finalist for the 2025 Lambda Literary Award for LGBTQ+ Comics.

Girlmode received starred reviews from Publishers Weekly, Kirkus Reviews, and School Library Journal. Publishers Weekly praised the novel's art and dialogue, stating that the book balanced portrayals of transmisogyny with showing teens make amends for their mistakes. Francisca Goldsmith, reviewing for School Library Journal, praised Girlmode's authentic and sympathetic portrayal of Phoebe, as well as the work's art. Goldsmith recommended the novel for grades eight and up, saying it belonged in every collection.

In Harford County, Maryland, Girlmode was the target of a school library book ban campaign in 2025. This followed the removal of Flamer, by Mike Curato, from Harford schools, and resulting appeals over its ban.
