= John Birdsall =

John Birdsall may refer to:

- John Birdsall (politician, born 1802) (1802–1839), American lawyer and politician from New York and Texas
- John Birdsall (politician, born 1840) (1840–1891), American Union Army officer, lawyer and politician from New York
- John Birdsall (writer) (born 1959 or 1960), American food writer
