= Little Elliot =

Children's book series by Mike Curato

Little Elliot is a series of children's picture books, written and illustrated by Mike Curato and published by Henry Holt and Company. The series consists of five books: Little Elliot, Big City (2015); Little Elliot, Big Family (2015); Little Elliot, Big Fun (2016); Little Elliot, Fall Friends (2017); and Merry Christmas, Little Elliot (2018). The books follow the adventures of Elliot, a small, polka-dotted elephant.

== Little Elliot, Big City (2015) ==
Little Elliot, Big City was published August 26, 2014. It has since been translated into 12 languages (non-US English, Bulgarian, Catalan, French, German, Hebrew, Korean, Italian, Mandarin [simplified and traditional], Russian, and Spanish).

It received starred reviews from Publishers Weekly and Booklist, as well as positive reviews from School Library Journal, The Horn Book, and The New York Times. Kirkus provided a mixed review.

== Little Elliot, Big Family (2015) ==
Little Elliot, Big Family was published October 6, 2015. It has since been translated into nine languages (Bulgarian, Catalan, French, German, Mandarin [simplified and traditional], Russian, Spanish, and Japanese).

The received starred reviews from Kirkus and Publishers Weekly, as well as positive reviews from School Library Journal, Booklist, and Shelf Awareness.

== Little Elliot, Big Fun (2016) ==
Little Elliot, Big Fun was published August 30, 2016. It has since been translated into six languages (Catalan, French, Mandarin [simplified and traditional], Spanish, and Japanese).

The book received starred reviews from Publishers Weekly and Booklist, as well as positive reviews from Kirkus and School Library Journal.

== Little Elliot, Fall Friends (2017) ==
Little Elliot, Fall Friends was published August 29, 2017.

The book received a starred review from Publishers Weekly, as well as positive reviews from Kirkus, Booklist, and School Library Journal.

== Merry Christmas, Little Elliot (2018) ==
Merry Christmas, Little Elliot was published September 11, 2018.

The book received a starred review from Kirkus, as well as positive reviews from Publishers Weekly and Booklist.

== Accolades ==
Accolades for Little Elliot books
| Year | Book | Accolade | Result | Ref. |
|---|---|---|---|---|
| 2014 | Little Elliot, Big City | Society of Illustrators' Founder's Award | Winner | |
| 2014 | Little Elliot, Big City | Amazon's Best Books of 2014: Ages 3–5 | Selection | |
| 2014 | Little Elliot, Big City | HuffPost's Best Picture Books: Most Charming | Winner | |
| 2014 | Little Elliot, Big City | PBS Best Picture Books | Honorable Mention | |
| 2015 | Little Elliot, Big City | Ezra Jack Keats Award: New Illustrator | Honor | |
| 2015 | Little Elliot, Big City | Communication Arts Award of Excellence: Illustration | Winner | |
| 2015 | Little Elliot, Big City | New Atlantic Independent Booksellers Association: Picture Book of the Year | Winner | |
| 2015 | Little Elliot, Big Family | Amazon's Best Books of 2015: Ages 3–5 | Selection | |
| 2016 | Little Elliot, Big Family | Children's Book Council Children's Choice Illustrator | Finalist | |
| 2016 | Little Elliot, Big Family | NCTE Charlotte Huck Award | Recommended | |
| 2016 | Little Elliot, Big Family | IndieBound Indies Next List | Selection | |
| 2017 | Little Elliot, Fall Friends | HuffPost's Best Picture Books: Best Friendship/Kindness | Honorable Mention | |
