= Mikah Meyer =

American adventurer, preacher, and LGBTQ rights advocate

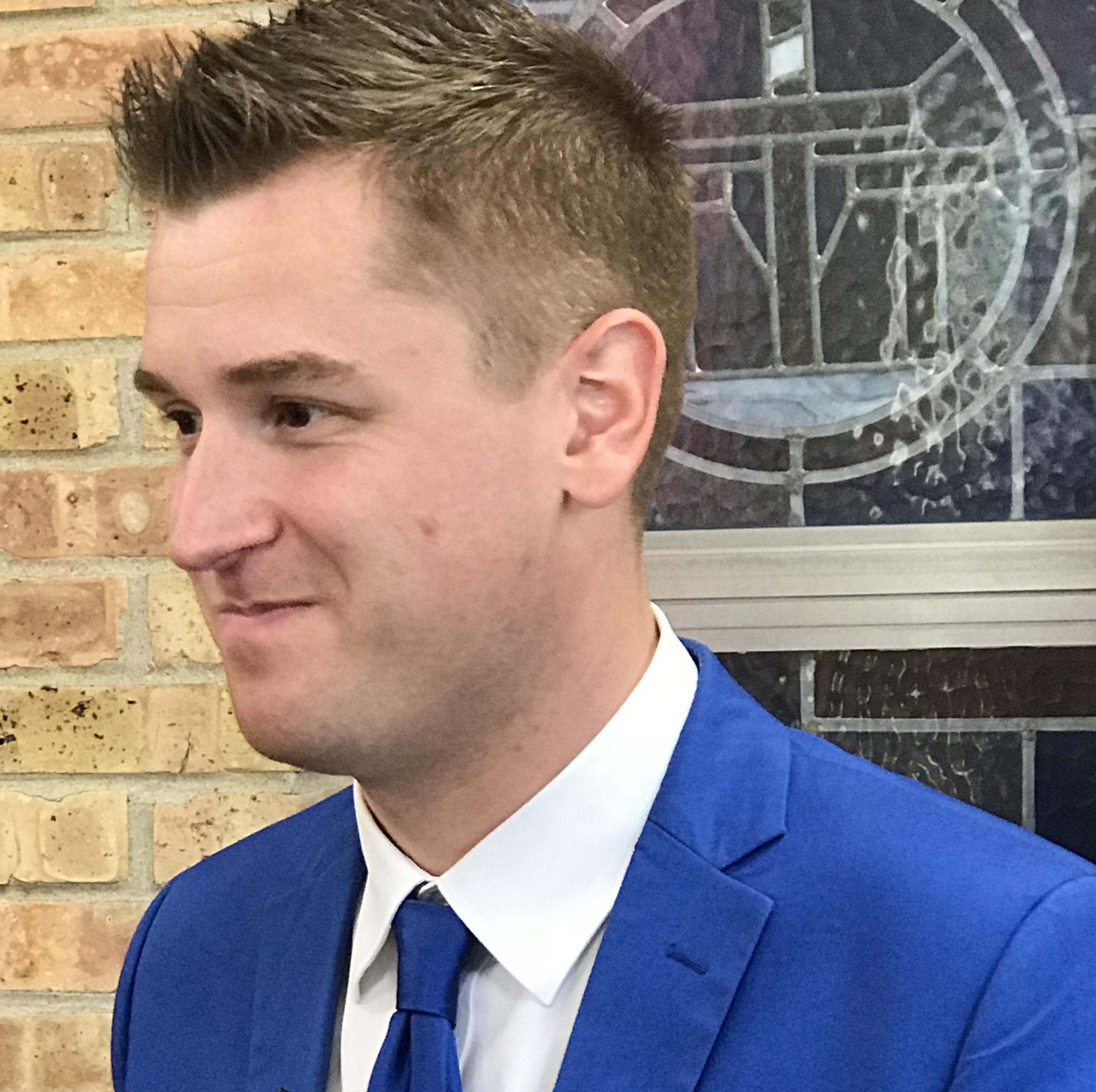
Meyer in 2018

Mikah Meyer is an American travel journalist and LGBTQ rights advocate. On April 29, 2019, he became the first person to visit all 419 units of the U.S. National Parks in a single journey. Meyer posted updates of his travels on Instagram. His trip was funded largely by donations collected at churches along the way where he sang and spoke aiming to spread a message of LGBTQ-inclusive Christianity. Meyer was recognized by NBC Out's #Pride50 as one of 20 veterans of the LGBTQ movement. Meyers is from Lincoln, Nebraska where father was a Lutheran pastor. Meyer founded the group Queers for Christ.
