= Gaysians =

2025 graphic novel by Mike Curato

- Author: Mike Curato
- Genre: Graphic novel
- Publisher: Algonquin Books
- Publication date: June 3, 2025
- Pages: 384
- ISBN: 978-1-64375-512-0

Gaysians is a 2025 graphic novel by American writer Mike Curato, published by Algonquin Books. It is Curato's first graphic novel for adults, following his young adult work Flamer.

== Synopsis ==
Set in Seattle in the early 2000s, the novel follows AJ, a young gay Asian American man who has recently come out and moved to the city. After a chance encounter at a bar, he befriends a group of other gay Asian men.

== Critical reception ==
Gaysians was named to Kirkus Reviews' Best Fiction of 2025. The following year, it won the Stonewall Book Award, the GLAAD Media Award for Outstanding Original Graphic Novel/Anthology, and the Lambda Literary Award for LGBTQ+ Comics.

In a starred review, BookPage called the novel "a brilliant and beautifully drawn celebration of found family and belonging." Publishers Weekly called the novel a "warmhearted tale of found family." Kirkus Reviews gave it a starred review, calling it "a tender and compelling coming-of-age story" and writing that it is "more than anything, perhaps—a story about how the family we're born into may compel us to create a chosen family."
