= Kaila Story =

American academic and podcaster

- Born: January 9, 1980 (age 46); Ann Arbor, Michigan, US
- Occupations: Associate professor Podcaster
- Spouse: Missy Story-Jackson (m. 2016)

Academic background
- Education: DePaul University; Temple University

Academic work
- Discipline: Women's and Gender Studies; Pan-African Studies
- Institutions: University of Louisville

Kaila Adia Story-Jackson (born January 9, 1980) is an American academic and podcaster. Story's academic work focuses on the intersections of gender, sexuality, and race.

== Early life and education ==
Story was born in Ann Arbor, Michigan on January 9, 1980. She came out as a lesbian at the age of 16.

Story completed a bachelor's degree in Women and Gender Studies at DePaul University. At DePaul Story declared herself a feminist, though she felt she was "much more hard core" than her white feminist peers. She also noted that she was the only black female student majoring in women's studies during her first three years in college. Story graduated from Temple University in 2007 with a masters and doctorate in African American Studies, and a certificate in Women and Gender Studies.

== Career ==
Story is an associate professor of Women's and Gender Studies at the University of Louisville, with a joint appointment in the Pan-African Studies department. She holds the Audre Lord Chair in Race, Gender, and Sexuality. She has created courses on intersectional topics, including "Black Lesbian Lives" and "Queer Perspectives in Literature and Film". Story has been voted "faculty favorite" at Louisville every year since 2007.

Story co-hosts the Strange Fruit podcast on public radio station WFPL with Jaison Gardner. The podcast, which covers topics including race, the LGBTQ community, and social justice, celebrated its 200th episode in June 2017. Guests interviewed on the podcast have included Janelle Monáe, Janet Mock, and Wanda Sykes.

In 2025, Story published the book The Rainbow Ain't Never Been Enuf: On the Myth of LGBTQ+ Solidarity. The book was named a finalist for the 2026 Amber Hollibaugh Award.

== Honors and recognition ==
In October 2015, Story was honored as a "champion of fairness" at a Fairness Campaign event in Louisville, for making an impact on LGBT civil rights.

In June 2017, Story was included in the inaugural NBC Out #Pride30 list.

== Personal life ==
Story married her wife Missy Story-Jackson in April 2016. The couple lives in Louisville, Kentucky.

== Selected publications ==
- Story, Kaila Adia (2008). "There's No Place like" Home": Mining the Theoretical Terrain of Black Women's Studies, Black Queer Studies and Black Studies" (PDF). Journal of Pan African Studies. 2 (2).
- Story, Kaila Adia (2010). "Racing Sex–Sexing Race". In Henderson, Carol E. (ed.). Imagining the Black Female Body. Palgrave Macmillan. pp. 22–43. doi:10.1057/9780230115477_2. ISBN 9781349290536.
- Story, Kaila Adia, ed. (2014). Patricia Hill Collins: Reconceiving Motherhood. Demeter Press. ISBN 9781927335437.
- Story, Kaila Adia (2015). "(Re)Presenting Shug Avery and Afrekete: The Search for a Black, Queer, and Feminist Pleasure Praxis". The Black Scholar. 45 (4): 22–35. doi:10.1080/00064246.2015.1080913. S2CID 143219457.
- Story, Kaila Adia (2016). "Fear of a Black femme: The existential conundrum of embodying a Black femme identity while being a professor of Black, queer, and feminist studies". Journal of Lesbian Studies. 21 (4): 407–419. doi:10.1080/10894160.2016.1165043. PMID 27723426.
- Story, Kalia Adia (2025). The Rainbow Ain't Never Been Enuf. Beacon Press. ISBN 978-080700465-4.
