= Brooms (graphic novel) =

2023 comic by Jasmine Walls and Teo Duvall

Publication information
- Publisher: Levine Querido

Creative team
- Written by: Jasmine Walls
- Artist: Teo Duvall
- Colorist: Bex Glending

Brooms is an American fantasy and fiction graphic novel, written by Jasmine Walls and illustrated by Teo Duvall. It was first published on October 10, 2023.

== Synopsis ==
In the US state of Mississippi, six young witches, fighting to escape the oppression of a colonizing government that controls magic, take part in illegal broomstick racing. The group of young witches, who call themselves "The Night Witches", face the oppression throughout the story line and fight against sabotage to win the broomstick races and gain their freedom.

== Characters ==
The group consist of Billy Mae and Loretta of African ancestry, Cheng Kwan, who is Chinese-American and transgender, Luella, who is a Mexican of Choctaw ancestry, and Mattie and Emma, two sisters who are Black and Choctaw. Emma is deaf and uses sign language to communicate. Loretta, who has had a stroke earlier, uses a leg brace.

The groups chosen name "The Night Witches" is likely a reference to the all women Soviet-era aviation unit.

== Critical reception ==
Tirzah Price, writing a review for Book Riot, compared the work to the web series A League of Their Own, but with the addition of magic. She appreciated the way in which fictional broom racing did not simply represent a competition within the plot, but served as a community space for the protagonists, who belonged to different racial demographics and included queer characters. She also cites the writer's ability to narrate in a balanced way as the stories involve a large group of characters, and described the artwork as expressive and colorful. Although the work does not have a particularly happy conclusion for all the protagonists, a series of epilogues at the end of it shows a brief look at the future of each of them after the end of the story, bringing hope and the vision of a better future for all of them. Jonathan H. Liu, writing for Geek Dad, included it in his list of his favorite books for 2023.

Awards and Nominations
Year	Award	Result	Ref.
2024	American Library Association's Great Graphic Novels for Teens	Top Ten	
2024	Ignyte Award for Outstanding Comics Team	Finalist	
2023	Cybils Awards for Graphic Novel	Finalist	
