= All the Young Men (memoir) =

2020 memoir

- Genre: memoir

All the Young Men: How One Woman Risked It All to Care For The Dying is a memoir about Ruth Coker Burks published in 2020. The book describes her experiences caring for young gay men who were dying during the HIV/AIDS epidemic. It was ghostwritten by Kevin Carr O'Leary.

== Background ==
In 1986, Coker Burks was visiting a friend with cancer at a hospital, and became aware of a young man who was dying alone. She stayed with him after learning that his mother would not visit because he was gay. This experience prompted her to help other young men who were facing similar circumstances. Coker Burks lived in Arkansas, where stigma and inadequate medical care for these patients was a prevalent issue.

Prior to the memoir's publication, Coker Burks set up a GoFundMe fundraiser for $75,000 to build a memorial to young men who had died of AIDS at a cemetery in Hot Springs. This fundraiser ran from 2015 to 2017. Coker Burks was critcized for using the funds to pay for her medical bills instead of building the intended memorial.

== Reception ==
The book was positively reviewed by the Bay Area Reporter and the San Francisco Chronicle. In a review for The Guardian, Olivia Laing described Coker Burks as "a bottle-blonde Methodist and divorced single mother in a hyper-conservative town" and a "sex-positive Florence Nightingale". Laing was skeptical of placing too much emphasis on heterosexual people who were "a vanishingly rare exception to a rule of homophobia, cruelty and prejudice" but still considered her life story to be uplifting.
