= Lunar New Year Love Story =

2024 graphic novel by Gene Luen Yang and LeUyen Pham

- Date: January 9, 2024
- Page count: 352 pages
- Publisher: First Second

Creative team
- Writer: Gene Luen Yang
- Artist: LeUyen Pham
- ISBN: 9781250908261

Lunar New Year Love Story is a 2024 romance graphic novel written by Gene Luen Yang and illustrated by LeUyen Pham. It was widely positively received, including winning three Eisner awards.

== Plot ==
After learning a secret about her allegedly dead mother, Vietnamese American teenager Valentina believes her family is cursed when it comes to love. Her imaginary friend, who previously appeared as Cupid, transforms into a ghostly figure haunting her. However, after a chance encounter with a lion dancer at a Tết Lunar New Year celebration, she enters a relationship.

== Reception ==
The book received starred reviews from Publishers Weekly, the Horn Book, School Library Journal, and Kirkus Reviews. Both Kirkus Reviews and the Horn Book praised the "kinetic" depiction of lion dancers. The Beat commented on Pham's artwork and the opening sequence.

=== Accolades ===
Year	Award/Honor	Result	Ref.
2025	Eisner Award for Best Publication for Teens	Won	
2025	Eisner Award for Best Graphic Album – New	Won	
2025	Eisner Award for Best Writer	Won	
2025	American Library Association's Great Graphic Novels for Teens	Top Ten	
2025	Ignyte Award for Outstanding Comics Team	Shortlisted	
2024-2025	Asian/Pacific American Awards for Literature - Young Adult Literature	Shortlisted	
2024	Harvey Award for Book of the Year	Shortlisted	
