= Magdalene Visaggio =

American comic book writer

- Born: September 22, 1984; Long Island, New York, United States
- Occupation: Comic book writer
- Writing career
- Period: 2007–present
- Notable works: Girlmode; Kim & Kim; Vagrant Queen

Magdalene "Mags" Visaggio (born September 22, 1984) is an American comic book writer. Visaggio is known for her work on Kim & Kim and Vagrant Queen. Her comics have been nominated for two Eisner Awards and three GLAAD Media Awards. Her comic series Vagrant Queen was adapted into a television series which ran for a single season on Syfy in 2020.

== Personal life ==
Visaggio was born in 1984 on Long Island and grew up in Richmond, Virginia. She attended Virginia Commonwealth University and Seton Hall University.

Visaggio is a trans woman and is autistic. She is a member of the Democratic Socialists of America.

== Career ==
Visaggio's first published work was in 2006 as writer and co-creator of Sanctuary, a series self-published with Martin Krause and Kevin Roberts. The first three issues of the series were subsequently rewritten by Visaggio before being renamed Stronghold in 2014 with a collected edition of the first three issues and the series continuing on under the new moniker from #4. In 2015 Visaggio used Kickstarter to publish the first issue of Andrew Jackson in Space. From 2016 to 2017, Visaggio contributed a number of articles on comic books to Paste.

Visaggio came to wider prominence in the comic book industry with the limited series Kim & Kim from Black Mask Studios. The series was nominated for the 2017 Eisner Award for Best Limited Series and GLAAD Media Award for Outstanding Comic Book. The success led to Visaggio signing a three-book deal with Black Mask Studios for her next three projects: Quantum Teens Are Go, Kim & Kim: Love is a Battlefield, and Sex Death Revolution.

In 2017, she was chosen to take part in DC Comics' Writers Workshop program, studying under Scott Snyder. Her first published work for DC was for the Young Animal imprint where she wrote several backup features and the limited series Eternity Girl. Short stories from her time in the Writers Workshop were featured in the one-shots DC Cursed Comics Cavalcade and DC New Talent Showcase 2018.

In 2018, her graphic novel The Ojja-Wojja: A Teen Horror Mystery or Whatever, You Know? was bought by HarperCollins imprint Balzer + Bray in a two-book deal, with the first book to come out in spring 2021. 2018 also saw the debut of Vagrant Queen from publisher Vault Comics. In 2019, Visaggio co-write Strangelands with Darcie Little Badger for Humanoids imprint H1. She also published her first work with Valiant Comics that year, a new volume of Doctor Mirage.

In 2020, Visaggio launched a second volume of Vagrant Queen at Vault Comics and her second series at ComiXology, Lost on Planet Earth. Also in 2020, a television series adaptation of Vagrant Queen aired on Syfy (co-produced by Blue Ice Pictures), but after a single ten-episode season the series was cancelled due to low ratings.

In 2024, Visaggio published the graphic novel Girlmode, illustrated by Paulina Ganucheau. The work was a finalist for a 2025 Lambda Literary Award for LGBTQ+ Comics.

== Awards and nominations ==
- 2017 Eisner Award for Best Limited Series – Kim & Kim (nominated)
- 2017 GLAAD Media Award for Outstanding Comic Book – Kim & Kim (nominated)
- 2018 GLAAD Media Award for Outstanding Comic Book – Quantum Teens Are Go (nominated)
- 2019 GLAAD Media Award for Outstanding Comic Book – Oh S#!t It's Kim & Kim (nominated)
- 2019 Eisner Award for Best Limited Series – Eternity Girl (nominated)
- 2025 Lambda Literary Award for LGBTQ+ Comics – Girlmode (finalist)

== Bibliography ==
=== Graphic novels ===
- Cold Bodies (Dark Horse Comics, 2022)
- The Ojja-Wojja (HarperCollins, 2023)
- Girlmode (HarperCollins, 2024)

=== Ongoing and limited series ===
- Archie Horror
  - The Cursed Library #0–3 (2024)
- Black Mask Studios
  - Kim & Kim #1–4 (2016)
  - Quantum Teens Are Go #1–4 (2017)
  - Kim & Kim: Love is a Battlefield #1–4 (2017)
  - Oh S#!t It's Kim & Kim #1–5 (2018)
  - Sex Death Revolution #1–5 (2018–2019, #4 & #5 were published digitally only)
- ComiXology Originals
  - Teenage Wasteland #1–3 (2018–2019)
  - Lost on Planet Earth #1–5 (2020)
- Dark Horse Comics
  - Calamity Kate #1–4 (2019)
- DC Comics
  - Eternity Girl #1–6 (2018)
- Humanoids
  - Strangelands #1–8 (co-writer with Darcie Little Badger, 2019–2020)
- IDW Publishing
  - Transformers vs. The Visionaries #1–5 (2018)
- Mad Cave Studios
  - Galaxy of Madness #1–10 (2024–2025)
- Oni Press
  - Rick and Morty #31, 33–35, 51, 53–55 (2017–2019) (Note: Backup story "The Rick Identity" only.)
  - Rick and Morty Presents: Sleepy Gary #1 (2018)
  - Morning in America #1–5 (2019)
  - Rick and Morty: Infinity Hour #1–4 (2022)
- Redline Comics
  - Sanctuary #1–3 (2006–2013) (Note: Issues rewritten and published as Stronghold Vol. 1: The Chains in 2014.) (Note: Credited as Brian Visaggio.)
  - Stronghold #4–7 (2014–2017)
  - Andrew Jackson in Space #1 (2015)
- Titan Comics
  - Rebel Moon: House of the Bloodaxe #1–4 (2024)
- Valiant Entertainment
  - Doctor Mirage #1–5 (2019)
- Vault Comics
  - Vagrant Queen #1–6 (2018–2019)
  - Vagrant Queen: A Planet Called Doom #1–6 (2020–2021)

=== Single issues ===
- Archie Horror
  - Chilling Adventures Presents... Jinx's Grim Fairy Tales #1 (2022) (Note: Frame story and "The True Story of Kevnetella".)
  - Fear the Funhouse #1 (2022) (Note: One story in an anthology comic.)
  - Chilling Adventures Presents... Jinx: A Cursed Life #1 (2023)
  - Chilling Adventures Presents... Strange Science #1 (2023)
- Boom! Studios
  - Mighty Morphin Power Rangers Anniversary Special #1 (2018)
- DC Comics
  - Shade, the Changing Girl #4 (2017) (Note: Backup story only.)
  - JLA/Doom Patrol Special #1 (2018) (Note: Eternity Girl backup story only.)
  - Mother Panic/Batman Special #1 (2018)
  - Shade the Changing Girl/Wonder Woman Special #1 (2018)
  - Cave Carson Has a Cybernetic Eye/Swamp Thing Special #1 (2018)
  - Cursed Comics Cavalcade #1 (2018)
  - New Talent Showcase 2018 #1 (2018)
  - Jinny Hex Special #1 (2020)
  - Dark Nights Death Metal: The Last 52 War of the Multiverse #1 (2020)
  - Action Comics #1057 (2023)
- IDW Publishing
  - Marilyn Manor #1 (2019)
  - Star Trek: Celebrations #1 (2024)
  - Star Trek #500 (2024)
- Mad Cave Studios
  - Tales from Nottingham #6 (2023)
- Marvel Comics
  - Secret Empire: Brave New World #3 (2017)
  - Venomverse: War Stories #1 (2017)
  - Dazzler: X-Song #1 (2018)
  - Magnificent Ms. Marvel Annual #1 (2019)
