= Cannon (graphic novel) =

Graphic novel by Lee Lai

- Author: Lee Lai
- Publisher: Drawn & Quarterly
- Publication date: September 2025
- ISBN: 978-1-923-10640-6

Cannon is a graphic novel by Lee Lai, published in September 2025 by Drawn & Quarterly. It won the 2026 Stella Award, Ignatz Award for Outstanding Graphic Novel, and Doug Wright Award for Best Book, also being shortlisted for several other major awards.

== Premise ==
Cannon follows a queer Chinese woman, known as Cannon to her friends and coworkers and Lucy to her family, working at a restaurant in Montreal in 2017. Flashback to Cannon's adolescence and earlier adulthood "reveal what led her to this breaking point”.

== Reception ==
Cannon was reviewed by The Guardian, The New York Times, and The New Yorker. It received starred reviews from Publishers Weekly and Booklist.

In May 2026 it won the Stella Award in Australia, becoming the first graphic novel to do so in the 14-year history of the award.

== Recognition and awards ==
Year	Award	Result	Ref.
2025	GLAAD Media Award for Outstanding Graphic Novel/Anthology	Shortlisted	
2025	Los Angeles Times Book Prize for Graphic Novel/Comics	Shortlisted	
2026	Victorian Premier's Literary Awards for Fiction	Shortlisted	
2026	Stella Prize	Won	
2026	Carol Shields Prize for Fiction	Shortlisted	
2026	Quebec Writers' Federation Awards - Paragraphe Hugh MacLennan Prize for Fiction	Shortlisted	
2026	Harvey Award for Book of the Year	Shortlisted	
2026	Eisner Award for Best Graphic Album — New	Shortlisted	
2026	Ignatz Award for Outstanding Graphic Novel	Won	
2026	Doug Wright Award for Best Book	Won	
2026	Libby Book Award for Comic/Graphic Novel	Shortlisted	
