= Lee Lai =

Australian-Canadian writer

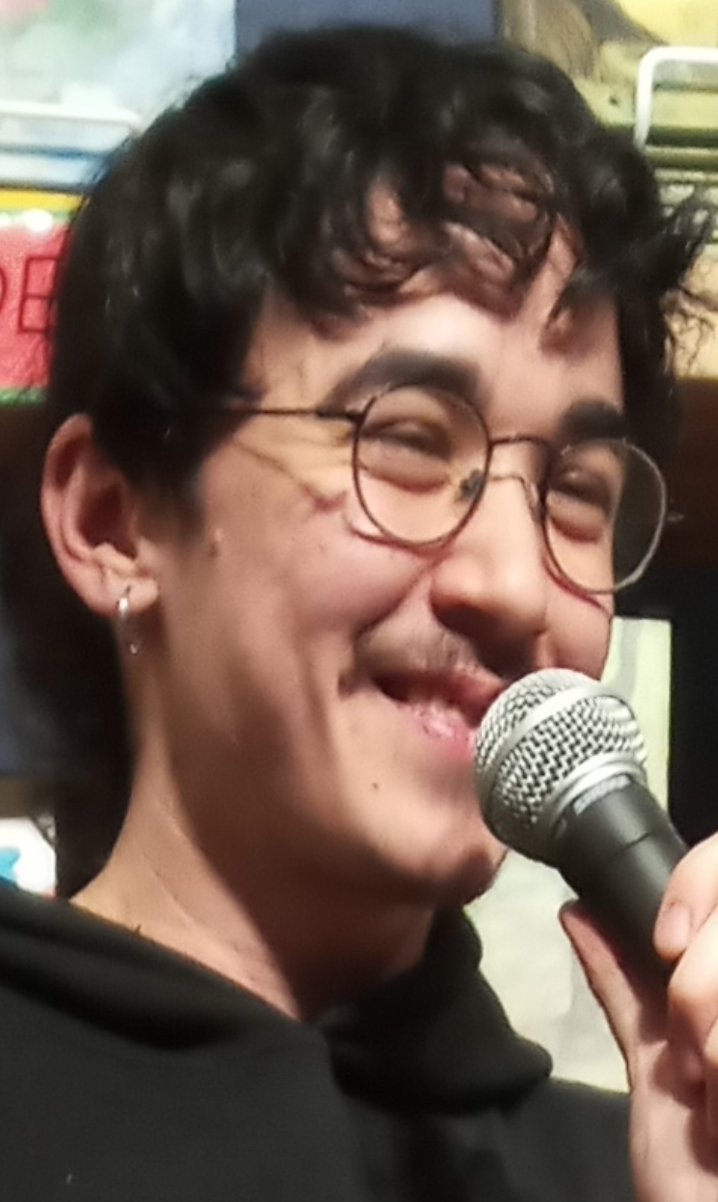
- Lai in 2023
- Born: 1993 (age 32–33); Melbourne, Australia
- Writing career
- Notable works: Stone Fruit; Cannon

Lee Lai (born 1993) is an Australian graphic novelist. Lee was born in Australia but has lived in Canada since 2016. She is known for her debut graphic novel Stone Fruit, for which she was named an honoree of the National Book Foundation's 5 Under 35 award in 2021. The book was also a finalist for several other awards in the US and Australia. In 2025, Lai released Cannon, which in May 2026 became the first graphic novel to win the Stella Prize, with Lai being the first trans and non-binary person to win the prize.

== Early life and education ==
Lee Lai was born in 1993 in Melbourne and has a sister, with whom she is close.

== Career ==
Lai became interested in comics because of mild dyslexia, which made reading traditional novels difficult. Her short story comics have been published in The New Yorker, The Lifted Brow, Room Magazine, and Everyday Feminism.

She published her first graphic novel, Stone Fruit, in 2021, which was shortlisted for the Stella Prize in Australia. It is also the first time that it has been won by a transgender person.

Her 2025 graphic novel, Cannon, is about friendship. It won the Stella Prize in May 2026, becoming the first graphic novel to do so in the 14-year history of the prestigious award. It has also been shortlisted for the 2026 Victorian Premier's Literary Awards and the Carol Shields Prize for Fiction.

As of 2026 she has been working for some years as a cartoonist, to provide a regular income to live on.

== Personal life ==
As of May 2026 Lai lives in Montreal. She moved there in 2016, in order to be able to make a living as a cartoonist and illustrator, owing to the larger market in North America.

Lai is transgender, non-binary, and gay.

== Awards and honours ==
Year	Title	Award	Result	Ref.
2020	Heartwood	Prism Award for Anthology	Won	
2021	Stone Fruit	American Library Association's Best Graphic Novels for Adults	Top 10	
2021	Stone Fruit	Ignatz Award for Outstanding Artist	Won	
2021	Stone Fruit	Ignatz Award for Outstanding Graphic Novel	Won	
2021	Stone Fruit	National Book Foundation's 5 Under 35 Award	Honoree	
2022	Stone Fruit	Barbara Gittings Literature Award	Honor	
2022	Stone Fruit	Cartoonist Studio Prize	Won	
2022	Stone Fruit	Doug Wright Award for Best Book	Finalist	
2022	Stone Fruit	Lambda Literary Award for Graphic Novel/Comics	Finalist	
2022	Stone Fruit	Los Angeles Times Book Prize for Graphic Novel/Comics	Finalist	
2022	Stone Fruit	American Library Association's Over the Rainbow Book List	Top 10	
2022	Stone Fruit	Stella Prize	Shortlisted	
2025	Cannon	Los Angeles Times Book Prize for Graphic Novel/Comics	Shortlisted	
2026	Cannon	Victorian Premier's Prize for Fiction	Shortlisted	
2026	Cannon	Carol Shields Prize for Fiction	Shortlisted	
2026	Cannon	Stella Prize	Won	

== Publications ==
- Stone Fruit (2021)
- Cannon (2025)

=== Contributions ===
- Heartwood: Non-binary Tales of Sylvan Fantasy, edited by Joamette Gil (2019)
- McSweeney's #62: The Queer Fiction Issue, edited by Patrick Cottrell, Dave Eggers (Editor), and Claire Boyle (Editor) (2020)

=== Illustrations ===
- A Head-Heart Start For Life: Creative Mindful Discoveries for Young Children, written by Janet Etty-Leal (2019)
