= Love, Misha =

2025 graphic novel by Askel Adan

- Date: June 10, 2025
- Publisher: First Second

Creative team
- Creator: Askel Adan
- ISBN: 978-1250866219

Love, Misha is a graphic novel by Askel Adan. It follows a non-binary teen and their estranged mother who become trapped in the Spirit Realm. It was published on July 10, 2025 by First Second.

== Plot ==
Misha, a non-binary teenager, goes on a road trip with their estranged mother Audrey, who has left Misha to be raised by their aunt for much of their life. Their tense relationship is further strained by how Audrey is not fully accepting of Misha's gender, misgendering them and presenting them with a dress. When the two end up stuck in the Spirit Realm after a wrong turn, mother and child must face their relationship as they try to escape with guidance from the mysterious spirit Odun.

== Reception ==
Publishers Weekly commented on the "comforting and eerie mythic setting" of the Spirit Realm and described the storyline as "emotionally gratifying." Kirkus Reviews positively reviewed Misha and Audrey as "delightfully flawed characters [with] a compelling arc", but criticized Odun's arc and the worldbuilding as underdeveloped. School Library Journal called the book "emotionally realistic, situationally fantastic, and vibrantly illustrated."

Michael VanCalbergh of Comics Beat praised the artwork, comparing it to the works of Studio Ghibli, and the varied designs of the creatures in the Spirit Realm. ValCalbergh felt complicated towards the character of Audrey, stating he wished she "found more room to grow, more room to do differently rather than promise to do differently", but acknowledged how the narrative portrayed how "each of us are human and not always in the places that could allow us to be our best selves."

=== Accolades ===
Year	Award/Honor	Result	Ref.
2026	Lambda Literary Award for LGBTQ+ Comics	Shortlisted	
2026	William C. Morris Award	Shortlisted	
2026	Great Graphic Novels for Teens	Top Ten	
