= Jamila Rowser =

American writer and publisher

- Born: England, United Kingdom
- Areas: Writer, publisher
- Notable works: Wash Day Diaries
- Collaborators: Robyn Smith
- Awards: Los Angeles Times Book Prize for Graphic Novel/Comics (2023)

Jamila Rowser is an American writer and publisher. She created the blog Girl Gone Geek (2010–2016), which was devoted to "nerd culture" topics like cosplay, video games, and anime. Rowser founded Black Josei Press as a publishing platform for Black and Brown women comic writers. Her graphic novel Wash Day Diaries (2022) won the Los Angeles Times Book Prize for Graphic Novel/Comics.

== Early life and education ==
Rowser's mother was in the Air Force, which required their family move around frequently. Rowser was born in England, and lived for short periods in several locales including the Netherlands, Germany, Hawaii, California, and New York. Her father was a teacher. She is Afro-Latina, and of African American, Dominican, and Puerto Rican descent.

She received her bachelor's degree in communication from New York Institute of Technology, after which she moved to Boca Raton to be near her mother in 2016.

== Career ==
Rowser created the blog Girl Gone Geek in 2010 to discuss her passions like video games, Star Wars, and Doctor Who, because she had few real life friends who were interested in them.

She developed an international meetup group called Geek Girl Brunch with her friends Rachel and Yissel to create a space for women and non-binary people to connect about nerd culture. She also developed Straight Outta Gotham, a Tumblr that examines the intersection of hip hop and geek culture. She runs the site with Jemar Souza.

Rowser created the publishing platform Black Josei Press to publish comics and merchandise by Black and Brown women creatives. She was inspired by josei manga to create the platform because she admires the scope of comics represented within this subtype of manga. In 2018 she wrote and published Wash Day and Wobbledy 3000, illustrated by Sabii Borno, a sci-fi comic about an extraterrestrial named Latoya who finds twerking difficult.

In 2020, Rowser co-edited Sun and Sand, an anthology of ten comics by South Florida-based artists with Neil Brideau, who approached her to help develop the project to be released on Free Comic Book Day (May 2). She wrote a comic included in the collection, As Above, So Below.

Rowser was hired as a comics outreach consultant at Kickstarter in August 2021. She resigned from the position a few months later in December, citing the company's new blockchain protocol.

=== Wash Day Diaries ===
In 2018 Rowser published her debut comic, Wash Day, under Black Josei Press, the first from the company. The book was illustrated by Robyn Smith and follows 26-year-old Kimana's Sunday morning hair washing routine. To fundraise for the book, Rowser created a Kickstarter campaign with a $5,000 goal that eventually exceeded $16,000 in donations by closing.

She again collaborated with Smith for Wash Day Diaries, a graphic novel centering the hair care journeys of four Black women. The book was published July 2022 by Chronicle Books and won the 2023 Los Angeles Times Book Prize for Graphic Novel/Comics and the 2023 Ignatz Award for Outstanding Story.

== Personal life ==
Rowser resides in Miami. She is queer.

== Works ==
- Wash Day (2018) ISBN 9781732419001, Black Josei Press
- Wobbledy 3000 (2018) ISBN 9781732419025, Black Josei Press
- As Above, So Below (2020) from Sun and Sand, Black Josei Press
- Ode to Keisha (2021) ISBN 9781732419063, Black Josei Press
- Wash Day Diaries (2022) ISBN 9781797205458, Chronicle Books

== Accolades ==
- 2018 − Best Comics of 2018, The Comics Journal (for Wash Day)
- 2018 − DiNKy award, Floppy Category, Denver Independent Comics & Art (for Wash Day)
- 2021 − Creative 100 Honoree, Adweek
- 2021 − Best Writer, Broken Frontier Awards (for Ode to Keisha)
- 2021 − Very Best Comics of 2021, Nerdist (for Ode to Keisha)
- 2023 − Los Angeles Times Book Prize for Graphic Novel/Comics (for Wash Day Diaries)
- 2023 − Ignatz Award for Outstanding Story (for Wash Day Diaries)
