= Forgive-Me-Not =

2026 graphic novel by Mari Costa

- Date: April 14, 2026
- Publisher: First Second

Creative team
- Creator: Mari Costa
- ISBN: 9781250784162

Forgive-Me-Not is a 2026 fantasy romance graphic novel by Mari Costa. It is about a kidnapped princess and her changeling who fall in love with each other. It was published by First Second.

== Plot ==
On the night before princess Aisling turns eighteen, a girl named Forget-Me-Not breaks into her room and announces herself as the king and queen's real daughter, stolen away and replaced as infant by the Unseelie fae Gristlebone, and reveals that Aisling, unbeknownst to herself, is a changeling and Gristlebone's daughter. Forget-Me-Not's iron sword then reverts Aisling to her true faerie appearance with purple skin, green hair, yellow sclera, red irises, horns, pointy ears, and a tail. Unable to prove her identity to her adoptive parents, Aisling is forced to travel with Forget-Me-Not meet to Gristlebone, who has forced Forget-Me-Not to be his servant ever since he abducted her, and with whom Forgive-Me-Not hopes to exchange Aisling for her freedom. As the two girls journey together, they gradually warm up to and fall for each other.

== Reception ==
The book received starred reviews from Publishers Weekly, Kirkus Reviews, and BookPage. Kirkus Reviews concluded that the book was "a stunningly beautiful Sapphic adventure about figuring out love and belonging," while Publishers Weekly commented on the artwork, saying "uncluttered illustrations and straightforward paneling allow the bright and colorful hues of the fairy realm to burst from the pages." It was also reviewed by School Library Journal, which compared it to Nimona. Autostraddle listed it as an anticipated book for April 2026.

The book was included the 2026 Graphic Novels and Manga High School selection by the Junior Library Guild.

== See also ==
- Belle of the Ball - graphic novel also by Costa
