= Yuichi Yokoyama =

Japanese artist

Yuichi Yokoyama (横山裕一, Yokoyama Yūichi, born April 3, 1967) is a Japanese manga artist, illustrator and painter. Trained in oil painting, Yokoyama transitioned from fine art to manga in the mid-1990s, seeking a more suitable medium to explore concepts of time, space, and motion, and had his breakthrough as an artist in the 2000s. His works are characterized by abstract environments, mechanical repetition, minimal dialogue, and immersive use of onomatopoeia, challenging traditional manga conventions and described as "neo manga". Internationally acclaimed, Yokoyama's work has been published and exhibited, among others, in France, the United States and South Korea.

== Life and career ==
Yokoyama was born in 1967 in Miyakonojō in Miyazaki Prefecture. While growing up, his family moved frequently, from Kyushu to Hokkaido to the Kanto region, due to his father's work.

In 1986 he enrolled in Musashino Art University in oil painting. After graduation in 1990, he first focused on painting, but didn't have enough money to buy oil paint, so he used plywood and house paint instead. He applied for different art contests, but didn't get any prizes, and was rejected from contributing to public art exhibitions. Eventually, he won a contest by an illustration magazine instead and he started to work in illustration in order to make a living.

Eventually, he gave up on art exhibitions and shifted his expression towards manga. He found it difficult to work with color and preferred black and white aesthetics, as typical in manga, and he found it easier to express time through serial pictures rather than single pictures. Yokoyama completely shifted his artistic focus to manga in 1995. He made his official debut as a manga artist in 2000 with "Pet" in the magazine Cyzo. The editor of the annual alternative manga magazine Comic Cue approached him and published several of his works in the 2000s. In 2002, he won the newcomer award of the manga magazine AX for the short story "Neo Taiiku".

In 2010, he held his first solo exhibition at Kawasaki City Museum. In 2016, an exhibition titled The World is Strange! Takaaki Taishi + Yuichi Yokoyama: Manga and Painting was held at the Hiroshima City Museum of Contemporary Art, featuring work by both Yokoyama and artist Takaaki Taishi. Yokoyama has exhibited internationally, including at the Palais de Tokyo and several times at the Centre Pompidou in Paris, the Haus Konstruktiv in Zurich, the Museum of Contemporary Art of Rome, the Seoul Museum of Art, the Anne Barrault Gallery as well as the 2009 J-POP SUMMIT in San Francisco. His work has also been featured in the French newspaper Libération. His manga have been published and gained a following in Japan, the United States and France. The English-language editions of Garden and Iceland were nominated for the Los Angeles Times Book Prize for Graphic Novel/Comics in 2011 and 2018 respectively. New Engineering was nominated for the Eisner Award for Best Short Story and the Eisner Award for Best U.S. Edition of International Material—Asia in 2008.

In parallel with his work as an author, he has undertaken a variety of projects: decorating a Toyota Prius for the Aichi Triennale in 2013, designing costumes for the Italian theater company Dewey Dell in 2013, and creating a window display for Hermès in Shinjuku in 2014. In 2021, as part of a project during the long-term renovation of the Hiroshima City Museum of Contemporary Art, newly drawn manga panels by Yokoyama were displayed on signs and roadblock fences within Hijiyama Park.

== Style and themes ==
Yokoyama’s manga are widely recognized as avant-garde manga and experimental. He described his distinct aesthetic as “neo manga” due to its radical departure from traditional storytelling and visual conventions. His works prioritize abstract, rhythmic compositions over narrative coherence, frequently eschewing character development, emotional expression, or human drama to create a sense of universality and detachment. His style has drawn international attention for its rejection of both manga orthodoxy and Western visual conventions, establishing him as a singular figure in contemporary comics and visual art.

=== Visual and storytelling concept ===
Yokoyama frequently uses tools such as rulers and templates to eliminate the personal touch typically associated with hand-drawn manga. Still, his work is drawn by hand rather than digitally. This reflects his broader artistic philosophy: a desire to remove the "human body smell" from his works and to create art that is not easily locatable in time, space, or culture. His characters often wear ambiguous clothing, lack identifiable national or historical markers, and inhabit spaces free from real-world references, including modern technology or celebrity culture. This deliberate de-characterization includes human figures that lack psychological depth or emotional expression, making them mainly function as visual elements.

A defining feature of Yokoyama’s style is his innovative use of sound effects. He saturates his panels with large, visually striking onomatopoeia that function both as auditory cues and as integral visual elements. Ryan Holmberg writes that World Map Room and Iceland "are crammed so heavily with roaring sound effects that the human figures are forced to navigate not just other people and physical obstacles but also sensorial invasions of visual and aural noise." This emphasis on sound creates immersive, often overwhelming sensory environments that challenge typical manga reading experiences. Many of his works use evenly timed panels and dense onomatopoeia, usually katakana such as do do do do or go ro go ro, to suggest movement and rhythm, functioning as visual markers of time as much as sound. His use of onomatopoeia extends beyond linguistic representation to become graphic phenomena, as seen in his 2020 work Moeru Oto ("Burning Sound"), which visually transforms sound into flame-like images. The phonetic and cultural specificity of Japanese onomatopoeia in Yokoyama’s work poses unique translation challenges.

Holmberg compares reading Yokoyama's work with video game aesthetics and multisensory reading experiences. According to Holmberg, his comics invite readers to engage in performative reading practices, vocalizing sound effects and experiencing the work as audiovisual compositions rather than traditional stories.

Conversely, Outdoors explores subtler sound perception and the reader’s active role in "hearing" silent comics, expanding manga’s capacity for audiovisual abstraction. Yokoyama's 2011 work Garden marks a distinctive development in his approach to storytelling and artistic structure. Garden features continuous, deliberately simplistic dialogue in which the characters narrate their immediate actions and observations as they explore a vast, surreal environment. According to Yokoyama, this narrative device serves both to create a humorous contrast with the characters' detached behavior and to make the complex visual sequences easier for readers to follow.

=== Themes ===
Recurring themes in his manga include infrastructure, travel, sound, and mechanical repetition. In New Engineering, Yokoyama depicts large-scale construction work without context or explanation, using the visual language of manga to emphasize motion, structure, and transformation. In Travel, he illustrates an aimless train journey across stylized landscapes, completely devoid of dialogue or onomatopoeia, heightening the sense of disorientation and detachment. Iceland features abstracted interactions in an ambiguous setting. In Garden, an endless hallway transforms into a vast library filled with wordless picture catalogs, implying that a universe can be represented entirely through a sequence of images rather than text. In Garden and Outdoors, surveillance, drones, and mediated sensory networks foreground the complex relationship between humans, technology, and perception.

Yokoyama asserts that the massive structures and landscapes within his stories "simply exist," and that he does not imagine any architects or creators behind them. The characters frequently pose questions that remain unanswered, reflecting Yokoyama’s belief that fiction does not require rational explanation. He describes this absence of resolution as more natural than the imposition of interpretive clarity, inviting readers to imagine their own meanings without the guidance of an overarching logic or authorial intention.

Yokoyama’s work frequently explores the theme of portability, reflecting an interest in small, compact devices and spaces. His narratives and settings often involve multifunctional objects that transform between compressed and full-size forms, as seen in Outdoors (2009). This motif of miniaturization conveys a vision of the world as a playground where grand, sublime phenomena are distilled into manageable, childlike forms. According to manga scholar Ryan Holmberg, his comics blend the ideas of homo faber (man the maker) and homo ludens (man the player), emphasizing cyclical creation and destruction as a form of naïve, divine play.

=== Influence ===
Yokoyama’s visual language is influenced more by modern poetry, abstract painting, and avant-garde art than by manga tradition. He has stated that he does not consider himself part of the established manga culture. His experimental approach stems from a lack of formal training in manga and a conscious rejection of its conventions. He has also criticized the art market's emphasis on individual expression and commercial success, and emphasizes instead the reader's interpretive freedom. He incorporates modernist aesthetics, such as the mechanization and rhythmic repetition reminiscent of Futurism and architectural monumentalism, as well as the personalized, playful modernism of 1960s and 1970s movements like Archigram. At the same time, he draws inspiration from Japanese painting traditions and artists like Tadashi Kawamata and historical painters like Vermeer. His work reflects a postmodern sensibility that blends the sublime with playful consumer-culture motifs.

He also draws inspiration from writers such as Ernest Hemingway and Masuji Ibuse, whose works present events with minimal emotional interpretation.

== Works ==
Title	Year	Notes	Refs
New Engineering (ニュー土木, New Doboku)	2004	Serialized in Comic Cue; Published by East Press in 1 vol. Published in English by PictureBox	
Travel (トラベル)	2006	Serialized in Comic Cue; Published by East Press in 1 vol. Published in English by PictureBox	
Garden (Niwa)	2007	Serialized in Comic Cue; Published by East Press in 1 vol. Published in English by PictureBox	
"Astronauts" (アストロノート)	2009	Short story published in Weekly Playboy	
Baby Boom (ベビーブーム)	2009	Serialized in Comic Cue; Published by East Press in 1 vol. Published in English by Breakdown Press	
Outdoor (アウトドアー)	2009	Published by Kodansha in 1 vol. Published in English by Breakdown Press	
Color Engineering	2011	Paintings published by PictureBox in 1 vol.	
World Map Room (世界地図の間, Sekai Chizu no Ma)	2013	Published by East Press in 1 vol. Published in English by PictureBox	
Fashion to Misshitsu (ファッションと密室)	2015	Published by 888Books in 1 vol.	
Iceland (アイスランド)	2017	Published by 888Books in 1 vol. Published in English by Retrofit Comics	
Plaza (プラザ)	2019	Published by 888Books in 1 vol. Published in English by Living the Line, LLC.	
Moeru Oto (燃える音, "Burning Sound")	2020	Published by 888Books in 1 vol.	
