= Los Angeles Times Book Prize for Graphic Novel/Comics =

Annual literary prize

- Country: United States
- Status: Active
- First award: 2009

The Los Angeles Times Book Prize for Graphic Novel/Comics, established in 2009, is a category of the Los Angeles Times Book Prize. Works are eligible during the year of their first US publication in English, though they may be written originally in languages other than English.

The Graphic Novel/Comics category was officially added to the awards roster for the 2009 cycle, reflecting the growing literary recognition of the medium. The inaugural winner in this category was David Mazzucchelli for his work, Asterios Polyp.

This prize is distinct in its eligibility criteria, often accepting books originally published in languages other than English, provided the US publication in English occurs within the eligibility year.

== Recipients ==
Los Angeles Times Book Prize for Graphic Novel/Comics winners and finalists
Year	Author	Title	Result	Ref.
2009	David Mazzucchelli	Asterios Polyp	Winner	
2009	Joe Sacco	Footnotes in Gaza	Finalist	
2009	Taiyo Matsumoto	GoGo Monster	Finalist	
2009	Gilbert Hernandez	Luba	Finalist	
2009	Bryan Lee O’Malley	Scott Pilgrim, Vol. 5: Scott Pilgrim vs. the Universe	Finalist	
2010	Adam Hines	Duncan the Wonder Dog: Show One	Winner	
2010	Dash Shaw	Bodyworld	Finalist	
2010	Karl Stevens	The Lodger	Finalist	
2010	Jim Woodring	Weathercraft	Finalist	
2010	C. Tyler	You’ll Never Know, Book Two: Collateral Damage	Finalist	
2011	Carla Speed McNeil	Finder: Voice	Winner	
2011	Dave McKean	Celluloid	Finalist	
2011	Jim Woodring	Congress of the Animals	Finalist	
2011	Yuichi Yokoyama	Garden	Finalist	
2011	Joseph Lambert	I Will Bite You! And Other Stories	Finalist	
2012	Sammy Harkham	Everything Together: Collected Stories	Winner	
2012	Alison Bechdel	Are You My Mother?: A Comic Drama	Finalist	
2012	Chris Ware	Building Stories	Finalist	
2012	Spain Rodriguez	Cruisin’ With the Hound: The Life and Times of Fred Toote	Finalist	
2012	Leela Corman	Unterzakhn	Finalist	
2013	Ulli Lust	Today is the Last Day of the Rest of Your Life	Winner	
2013	Anders Nilsen	The End	Finalist	
2013	Joe Sacco	The Great War: July 1, 1916: The First Day of the Battle of the Somme	Finalist	
2013	Ben Katchor	Hand-Drying in America: And Other Stories	Finalist	
2013	David B.	Incidents in the Night: Volume 1	Finalist	
2014	Jaime Hernández	The Love Bunglers	Winner	
2014	Olivier Schrauwen	Arséne Schrauwen	Finalist	
2014	Roz Chast	Can’t We Talk About Something More Pleasant? A Memoir	Finalist	
2014	Mana Neyestani	An Iranian Metamorphosis	Finalist	
2014	Mariko Tamaki and Jillian Tamaki	This One Summer	Finalist	
2015	Riad Sattouf	Arab of the Future: A Childhood in the Middle East, 1978–1984	Winner	
2015	Maggie Thrash	Honor Girl: A Graphic Memoir	Finalist	
2015	Sam Alden	New Construction: Two More Stories	Finalist	
2015	Carol Tyler	Soldier’s Heart: The Campaign to Understand My WWII Veteran Father: A Daughter’s Memoir (You’ll Never Know)	Finalist	
2015	Julian Hanshaw	Tim Ginger	Finalist	
2016	Nick Drnaso	Beverly	Winner	
2016	Anna Haifisch	The Artist	Finalist	
2016	Jason Shiga	Demon: Volume 1	Finalist	
2016	Patrick Kyle	Don’t Come in Here	Finalist	
2016	Rokudenashiko	What Is Obscenity: The Story of a Good for Nothing Artist and Her Pussy	Finalist	
2017	Leslie Stein	Present	Winner	
2017	Connor Willumsen	Anti-Gone	Finalist	
2017	Gabrielle Bell	Everything is Flammable	Finalist	
2017	Yuichi Yokoyama	Iceland	Finalist	
2017	Manuele Fior with Jamie Richards (trans.)	The Interview	Finalist	
2018	Tillie Walden	On A Sunbeam	Winner	no
2018	Michelle Perez and Remy Boydell	The Pervert	Finalist	
2018	Aisha Franz	Shit is Real	Finalist	
2018	Jérôme Ruillier	The Strange	Finalist	
2018	Eleanor Davis	Why Art?	Finalist	
2019	Eleanor Davis	The Hard Tomorrow	Winner	
2019	Keum Suk Gendry-Kim	Grass	Finalist	
2019	Jaime Hernández	Is This How You See Me?	Finalist	
2019	Mariko Tamaki and Rosemary Valero-O'Connell	Laura Dean Keeps Breaking Up with Me	Finalist	
2019	Michael DeForge	Leaving Richard's Valley	Finalist	
2020	Bishakh Kumar Som	Apsara Engine	Winner	
2020	Kaito	Blue Flag (Vol. 1-4)	Finalist	
2020	Jim Terry	Come Home, Indio: A Memoir	Finalist	
2020	Ben Passmore	Sports Is Hell	Finalist	
2020	Yeon-sik Hong with Janet Hong (trans.)	Umma’s Table	Finalist	
2021	R. Kikuo Johnson	No One Else	Winner	
2021	Michael DeForge	Heaven No Hell	Finalist	
2021	Hiromi Goto with Ann Xu (illus.)	Shadow Life	Finalist	
2021	Lee Lai	Stone Fruit	Finalist	
2021	Keum Suk Gendry-Kim with Janet Hong (trans.)	The Waiting	Finalist	
2022	Jamila Rowser and Robyn Smith	Wash Day Diaries	Winner	
2022	Alex Graham	Dog Biscuits	Finalist	
2022	Yamada Murasaki with Ryan Holmberg (trans.)	Talk to My Back	Finalist	
2022	Tommi Parrish	Men I Trust	Finalist	
2022	Noah Van Sciver	Joseph Smith and the Mormons	Finalist	
2023	E. M. Carroll	A Guest in the House	Winner	
2023	Derek M. Ballard	Cartoonshow	Finalist	
2023	Matías Bergara	Coda	Finalist	
2023	Sammy Harkham	Blood of the Virgin	Finalist	
2023	Chantal Montellier	Social Fiction	Finalist	
2023	Simon Spurrier	CODA	Finalist	
2024	Taiyo Matsumoto	Tokyo These Days	Winner	
2024	Kris Bertin	Hobtown Mystery Stories Vol. 2	Finalist	
2024	Miroslav Sekulic-Struja	Petar & Liza	Finalist	
2024	Bhanu Pratap	Cutting Season	Finalist	
2024	Ram Filipe Andrade	Rare Flavours	Finalist	
2025	Jaime Hernández	Life Drawing: A Love and Rockets Collection	Winner	
2025	Eagle Valiant Brosi	Black Cohosh	Finalist	
2025	Michael D. Kennedy	Milk, White, Steed	Finalist	
2025	Lee Lai	Cannon	Finalist	
2025	Carol Tyler	The Ephemerata: Shaping the Exquisite Nature of Grief	Finalist	
