= Stone Fruit =

2021 graphic novel by Lee Lai

- First edition cover
- Author: Lee Lai
- Publisher: Fantagraphics
- Publication date: May 11, 2021
- ISBN: 978-1-683-96426-1

Stone Fruit is a graphic novel by Lee Lai, published on May 11, 2021 by Fantagraphics. In 2022, the book won the Lambda Literary Award for Graphic Novel/Comics. It was a Barbara Gittings Literature Award honor book, and a finalist for the Los Angeles Times Book Prize for Graphic Novel/Comics.

== Reception ==
Stone Fruit was generally well-received, including starred reviews from Booklist and Publishers Weekly.

Publishers Weekly applauded how Lai "skillfully captures the ways family dynamics and histories play out in romantic relationships, and how heavy those legacies can land," which results in "a poignant and mature rumination on how people change, and change each other, proving Lai a talent well worth watching." Terry Hong, writing for Booklist, called the novel a "jaw-dropping debut" with "stunning artistry," complementing by Lai's "complex narrative skills." Laura Olive Sackton, writing for the Chicago Review of Books, also applauded the novel, calling it "[a] remarkable contribution to this chorus of queer storytelling," saying the narrative is filled with "smart dialogue and character growth" and that through the illustration, Lai "literally draws transformation, and the feelings it evokes, onto the page."

The Guardian's Rachel Cooke provided a mixed review, calling Stone Fruit "[a] downbeat but moving exploration of the aftermath of a relationship." Cooke noted that while the book is affective, "you finish it with no hope at all that its characters will ever be able to resolve their difficulties. There is something intensely bleak at its centre."

== Awards and honors ==
Year	Award	Result	Ref.
2021	American Library Association's Best Graphic Novels for Adults	Top 10	
2021	Ignatz Award for Outstanding Artist	Winner	
2021	Ignatz Award for Outstanding Graphic Novel	Winner	
2021	National Book Foundation's 5 Under 35 Award	Honoree	
2022	Barbara Gittings Literature Award	Honor	
2022	Lambda Literary Award for Graphic Novel/Comics	Winner	
2022	Los Angeles Times Book Prize for Graphic Novel/Comics	Finalist	
2022	American Library Association's Over the Rainbow Book List	Top 10	
2022	Stella Prize	Shortlist	
