= Belle of the Ball =

2023 graphic novel by Mari Costa

- Date: March 21, 2023
- Page count: 320 pages
- Publisher: First Second

Creative team
- Writer: Mari Costa
- Artist: Mari Costa

Belle of the Ball is a 2023 lesbian romance graphic novel by Mari Costa.

== Plot ==
Belle Hawkins, a teenage girl who acts as her high school's mascot, develops a crush on cheerleader Gina. Gina, already in a relationship with star athlete Chloe, gets Belle to serve as Chloe's English tutor. As the school year progresses, Belle's romantic feelings shift.

== Reception ==
Reception to the book was largely positive. Kirkus Reviews described the book's main trio as "lovingly imperfect and relatable" and concluded that it was a "low-stakes tale [that] feels like a warm, charming hug". The Hub, a blog for the Young Adult Library Services Association, praised the distinct designs for the main cast as well as pink-toned color scheme, and compared the book to Alice Oseman's Heartstopper or Lee Knox Ostertag's The Girl from the Sea. It was also reviewed by the School Library Journal.

The book was included in the 2024 Top Ten for the American Library Association's Great Graphic Novels for Teens, and was a finalist for the 2024 Lambda Literary Award for LGBTQ+ Comics.

== See also ==
- Forgive-Me-Not - graphic novel also by Costa
