= Mamo (comic) =

2021 comic by Sas Milledge

Publication information
- Publisher: Boom! Box
- Genre: Fantasy
- Publication date: July 7, 2021 - November 10, 2021 (comic); April 19, 2022 (graphic novel)
- No. of issues: 5

Creative team
- Written by: Sas Milledge
- Artist: Sas Milledge

Mamo is a 2021 five-issue comic book by Sas Milledge. It follows two girls, Orla and Jo, who attempt to restore peace in their hometown after Orla's grandmother, a witch, dies. Originally published from July to November 2021 by Boom! Box, it was later collected into a graphic novel on April 19, 2022.

== Plot ==
After the death of her grandmother Mamo, Orla O'Reilly is contacted by Jo Manalo. Mamo, as a hedge witch, used magic to balance the relationship between the human town Haresden and the local fae, and her death has thrown that relationship into disarray, resulting in environmental chaos. Orla is hesitant to return, as Mamo was an abusive guardian who tried to use magic to prevent Orla from escaping Haresden and her control. However, she agrees when she learns Mamo's ghost haunts Jo's house, cursing Jo's mother into an unwakeable slumber. To reverse the disasters, Orla and Jo must unearth Mamo's scattered bones and give them a proper burial. As the two girls work to solve the town's supernatural problems, their relationship grows romantic.

== Reception ==
Kirkus Reviews positively commented on the artwork, describing it as "combining natural and fantastical elements and rich, glowing, perfectly chosen colors," and giving particular attention to the characters' "expressively human and stylish" appearances. The review also considered the characters to be underdeveloped but "charming."

The Hub, a blog for the Young Adult Library Services Association, praised the art as being "beautiful and whimsical with cottagecore vibes," and described Orla and Jo's romance as developing "in a slow and beautiful way that teens will love." They compared also the book to Studio Ghibli's Kiki's Delivery Service and Howl's Moving Castle, as well as the graphic novels Mooncakes and Witchy.

Kathryn Hemmann of WomenWriteAboutComics noted the comic's themes of reconnecting with green spaces and the conflict between tradition and freedom.

The Beat included the book on its Best Comics of 2022 list, noting its use of symbolism and folklore and its LGBTQ themes.

=== Accolades ===
Year	Award/Honor	Result	Ref.
2023	Lambda Literary Award for LGBTQ+ Comics	Won	
2023	American Library Association's Great Graphic Novels for Teens	Top Ten	
2022	Ringo Award for Best Single Issue or Story	Shortlisted	
2022	Graphic Novels & Comics Round Table's Best Graphic Novels for Children	Included	
