= A Guest in the House =

2023 graphic novel by E. M. Carroll

- Date: August 15, 2023
- Publisher: 23rd Street Books

Creative team
- Creator: E. M. Carroll
- ISBN: 978-1250255525

A Guest in the House is a 2023 horror graphic novel by E. M. Carroll. The book details the relationship between Abby, a recently married woman, and the ghost of her husband's first wife Shelia. It is the 2024 winner of the Lambda Literary Award for LGBTQ+ Comics, Los Angeles Times Book Prize for Graphic Novel/Comics, and Doug Wright Award for Best Book.

== Plot ==
In Canada in the 1990s, Abby struggles with adapting to married life after moving in with her new husband David. She finds herself being haunted by a mysterious shapeshifting spirit who sometimes appears as a beautiful woman in a flowing gown and at other times as a grotesque undead figure dripping with water. Abby comes to believe the being is the ghost of Shelia, David's late first wife and the mother of his young daughter Crystal. She begins talking with her and grows increasingly close to the ghost, and starts experiencing vivid fantasy visions with herself as a knight and the ghost as a princess.

When another neighbor tells Abby that Shelia died by suicide, despite David's earlier claims that her death was from breast cancer, and Crystal mentions seeing her mother at the lake by their house, Abby confronts the ghost, who tells Abby that David actually murdered her by drowning her in a bathtub. Abby and the ghost take revenge, leading a drunk David to the lake, where Shelia drags him underwater and kills him. Abby then kisses the spectre. However, shortly afterwards Beth comes to the house and reveals herself as the real Shelia, who actually left the family due to her frustrations with David, with David fabricating the story of her death out of shame. The real Shelia then stabs Abby, having found David's body and thinking Abby is plotting to harm Crystal, resulting in an ambiguous ending that leaves the ghost's true nature or if it even existed uncertain.

== Reception ==
Publishers Weekly compared the plot of A Guest in the House to Rebecca by Daphne du Maurier, and gave particular attention to the artwork, which they described as "phantasmagoric" and "at once mesmerizing and teeth-clenchingly macabre."

Zack Quaintance of Comics Beat called the book of the best comics of the year, citing its limited point of view, with the reader being restricted to Abby's knowledge of the events, and further commented on art, with contrasting clean black-and-white panels in Abby's normal life and elaborate colorful sequences for her fantasies. Sadia Bies of The Comics Journal dubbed the book a "resounding success of horror in the medium of comics."

Tahneer Oksman of NPR positively remarked on the A Guest in the House's "chilling ambiance," describing it as "best read as a study of haunting and perception," though she argued that the ambiguous ending was "unsatisfactory."

The book received a starred review from Booklist. It was included the Canadian Broadcasting Corporation's best Canadian comics of 2023 list.

=== Accolades ===
Year	Award/honor	Result	Reference
2024	Doug Wright Award for Best Book	Won	
2024	Eisner Award for Best Lettering	Shortlisted	
2024	Eisner Award for Best Graphic Album — New	Shortlisted	
2024	Eisner Award for Best Writer/Artist	Shortlisted	
2024	Harvey Award for Book of the Year	Shortlisted	
2024	Lambda Literary Award for LGBTQ+ Comics	Won	
2024	Libby Book Award for Graphic Novel	Shortlisted	
2024	Los Angeles Times Book Prize for Graphic Novel/Comics	Won	
2024	World Fantasy Special Award—Professional	Shortlisted	
