= Coda (comics) =

Fantasy comic book series

Coda is a comic book series written by Simon Spurrier with art by Matías Bergara. The series debuted in 2018 and was published by BOOM! Studios.

== Background ==
Coda is a comic book series written by Simon Spurrier with art by Matías Bergara, coloring assistance by Michael Doig, lettering by Jim Campbell, and cover variants by Toni Infante and Nick Dragotta. The series debuted in 2018 and was published by BOOM! Studios. The series consists of 12 issues and is set in an apocalyptic fantasy world. The first four issues were released as a trade paperback. A hardcover edition of the series was also released. Spurrirer was introduced to Bergara by Eric Harburn who edited the series. The story follows a bard named Hum who is trying to save his wife's soul. Mad Max is referenced in the series.

A sequel series entitled Coda: False Dawns began releasing a monthly series for five issues in 2023. A trade paperback was released with all five issues in 2024.

== Reception ==
Writing in The A.V. Club, Caitlin Rosberg compared the series to the 1977 film Wizards. Sonnet Ireland wrote in LibraryJournal that the story has "many intriguing plot twists" and that the "illustration and color pop, bringing the story to life". Christian Holub praised the series in Entertainment Weekly saying that it is "a unique angle on the fantasy genre" with "truly eye-popping art". The series was included in lists of the best comics on websites such as Entertainment Weekly, Den of Geek, and Gizmodo.

=== Awards ===
Award	Date	Category	Result	Ref.
Los Angeles Times Book Prize	2023	Graphic Novel/Comics	Finalist	
Association of Critics and Journalists of Comics	2021	Comics Prize	Won	
Ignyte Awards	2020	Best Comics Team	Nominated	
