= Robyn Smith (cartoonist) =

American cartoonist

- Notable work: Nubia: Real One, Wash Day Diaries
- Awards: Los Angeles Times Book Prize for Graphic Novel/Comics

Robyn-Brooke Smith is a Jamaican writer and cartoonist based in the United States. She is the author of The Saddest, Angriest, Black Girl in Town and the illustrator of Wash Day, Nubia: Real One, and Wash Day Diaries, for which she received the Los Angeles Times Book Prize for Graphic Novel/Comics.

== Early life and education ==
Smith was born and raised in Kingston, Jamaica. She aspired to become a cartoonist from childhood, inspired in part by her father, a portrait artist and her mother, a makeup artist. She also enjoyed reading Archie Digest, which she considers a key influence on her work. Smith's family immigrated to the Bronx when she was 16, after she graduated high school.

Smith received her bachelor's degree from Hampshire College and received her master of fine arts degree from the Center for Cartoon Studies.

== Career ==
During her graduate program at the Center for Cartoon Studies she developed her debut comic book The Saddest Angriest Black Girl In Town (2016) as a mini-thesis project, a memoir about "her experience being one of the only Black people in a rural Vermont town and how that time affected her mental health and her grasp of how Blackness is viewed in the world." The book was named to the 2016 Best Short Form Comics list by The Comics Journal. After going out of print, it was reprinted in 2021 by Black Josei Press. Smith also published comics on CollegeHumor.

Jamila Rowser approached Smith to illustrate Wash Day, a comic about a hair care ritual for Black women, published in 2018 after a successful Kickstarter campaign. It won a 2019 DiNKy Award for Best Floppy Comic. She also illustrated the follow-up graphic novel Wash Day Diaries, for which she and writer Jamila Rowser received the 2023 Los Angeles Times Book Prize for Graphic Novel/Comics and the 2023 Ignatz Award for Outstanding Story.

Smith illustrated Nubia: Real One (2021), a DC comic written by L.L. McKinney.

== Works ==
=== Illustration ===
- 2016 – The Saddest Angriest Black Girl In Town, writer and illustrator
- 2018 – Wash Day, written by Jamila Rowser, Black Josei Press ISBN 9781732419001
- 2021 – Nubia: Real One, written by L.L. McKinney, DC Comics ISBN 1401296408
- 2022 – Wash Day Diaries, written by Jamila Rowser, Chronicle Books ISBN 9781797205458

== Accolades ==
- 2016 – Best Short Form Comics, The Comics Journal (for The Saddest Angriest Black Girl In Town)
- 2021 – Emerging Talent Award, Cartoon Crossroads Columbus
- 2023 – Los Angeles Times Book Prize for Graphic Novel/Comics (for Wash Day Diaries)
- 2023 - Ignatz Award for Outstanding Story (for Wash Day Diaries)
