= Everyone on the Moon Is Essential Personnel =

2020 short story collection

- Author: Julian K. Jarboe
- Language: English
- Genre: Short story collection
- Published: 2020 (Lethe Press)
- Pages: 222
- ISBN: 978-1-59021-692-7

Everyone on the Moon Is Essential Personnel is a short story collection by Julian K. Jarboe. Jarboe's first collection, it was published in March 2020 by Lethe Press. The stories in the collection relate to the human body, depicting both embodiment in and alienation from it; they address various additional themes and use genres including fairy tale, body horror, and mid-apocalypse stories. Most characters in the collection are queer.

The book was positively reviewed, and won the 2021 Lambda Literary Award for LGBTQ Science Fiction/Fantasy/Horror.

== Background ==
Before publishing Everyone on the Moon Is Essential Personnel, Julian K. Jarboe published work in The Atlantic and Strange Horizons as well as Fairy Tale Review, Hypocrite Reader, Uncanny Magazine, and Paper Darts. Most of the works in Everyone on the Moon Is Essential Personnel were previously published in one of these venues. The collection was originally planned as a shorter chapbook, but Jarboe was offered the opportunity to publish a longer collection, and expanded Everyone on the Moon Is Essential Personnel using more previously published work; the author used a spreadsheet to analyze their writing and choose stories with common themes to be in the collection. The book, Jarboe's first short story collection, was released on March 5, 2020, by Lethe Press.

== Content ==
Everyone on the Moon Is Essential Personnel includes 13 short stories and two poems, as well as a novella. Stories in the collection relate to the human body, depicting embodiment as well as alienation from the body; they address themes including cultural influence, institutions, and human struggles as well as queer identity, unhealthy family relationships, generational trauma, and anti-capitalism. Genres include fairy tale, body horror, and mid-apocalypse stories as well as science fiction. Most characters are queer.

== Reception ==
In Los Angeles Review of Books, Sara Rauch praised the short stories contained in Everyone on the Moon Is Essential Personnel and stated that the book "succeeds as a cohesive whole." She concluded that the collection is "dizzying and painful and, ultimately, glorious." In Locus, Katharine Coldiron reviewed the collection positively, describing it as imperfect but innovative and "and, in moments, quite brilliant." Coldiron wrote that the most powerful part of Jarboe's writing is their subversion of clichés, and stated that their writing is an example of queering because of the way their stories follow "a set of rules close to but not quite the same as the standard". A starred review in Publishers Weekly found Everyone on the Moon Is Essential Personnel to be an "outstanding debut collection [which] demonstrates a flair for queer surrealism and an ear for lyrical prose." The review praised the "tenderness, humor, and righteous anger" found in the collection as well as its insight into marginalized characters.

In Strange Horizons, Iori Kusano described Everyone on the Moon Is Essential Personnel as punk, characterizing the collection as "an angry anti-capitalist thrill ride that kept me up way past bedtime" and concluding that it was "a strong debut collection from an innovative author". Casey Plett recommended Everyone on the Moon Is Essential Personnel in Electric Literature, writing that "Jarboe's writing makes me weepy and laugh deliriously at the same time" and praising their successful interweaving of "the funny-sad thing, sprinkling jokes and bummers on the same page". Writing for Lambda Literary, David Pratt approved of the language, imagery, and sociopolitical analysis in the collection, as well as its "heartrending reflections on the lives of those who struggle to align body, desire and identity and yet, find themselves bluntly rejected." Pratt concluded that "Jarboe is able to honestly grapple with this world". In The Rumpus, E.B. Bartels praised Everyone on the Moon Is Essential Personnel as "more than a clever take on the world we live in" and described it as a reimagination of real issues using fiction.

In 2021, Everyone on the Moon Is Essential Personnel won the Lambda Literary Award for LGBTQ Science Fiction/Fantasy/Horror.
