= Ruth Coker Burks =

American HIV activist

White House Senior Consultant on AIDS Education
- In office 1993–1995
- Preceded by: Office established
- Succeeded by: Office abolished

Personal details
- Born: Frances Ruth Coker Burks; March 19, 1959 (age 67) Hot Springs, Arkansas
- Party: Democratic
- Occupation: Real estate agent, fishing guide, political consultant, humanitarian

Frances Ruth Coker Burks (born March 19, 1959), also known as the Cemetery Angel, is a former carer of AIDS crisis patients and an AIDS awareness advocate based in Arkansas. During the AIDS epidemic in the late 1980s, she used her salary as a real estate agent to care for AIDS patients whose families and communities had abandoned them. Due to the stigma surrounding the disease at the time, she was often the patients' only carer until they eventually died. She is additionally recognized for burying a number of AIDS victims in Hot Springs, Arkansas.

== Early life ==
Named after her grandmother, Burks was born in Hot Springs, Arkansas, and was friends with Bill Clinton growing up. Raised in a Methodist family, her mother Aline (née Lawler) was hospitalized with tuberculosis for a prolonged period during her childhood, during which Burks' father was her primary caretaker until his death when she was 5. After this, Burks was raised by her mother in an abusive household, including periods where she was placed into orphanages.

Burks's family members have been buried in Files Cemetery in Hot Springs since the late 19th century. According to Burks, her mother eventually purchased all 262 plots left in the cemetery after an argument with Burks's uncle to ensure that he and his family would not be buried there. Later, Burks's mother left her the land, which she would go on to use to bury some of her patients. Burks's claimed ownership of these plots has been disputed.

As an adult, Burks worked as a real estate broker. Burks married and had a child before divorcing, raising her daughter Alison as a single parent. Burks worked numerous jobs during this period, including at a sawmill and a race track, whilst acting as an AIDS advocate.

== AIDS advocacy ==
Burks' first interaction with an AIDS patient occurred in 1984, when she was visiting a friend who was receiving treatment for cancer at a hospital in Little Rock, Arkansas. Burks noticed that nurses were afraid to go into a room belonging to a patient diagnosed with what had until August 1982 been known as Gay-Related Immune Deficiency (GRID). Burks met the patient, who requested to see his mother before he died. Burks telephoned her, but despite threatening to publish the man's true cause of death in the local paper, his mother continued to refuse to see him or claim his body when he died. Subsequently, Burks took over his palliative care and comforted him until his death 13 hours later. After struggling to find a funeral home that would bury him, Burks was able to have his body cremated, and buried his ashes in her father's grave.

Burks began to receive regular phone calls, initially from hospitals and later from AIDS patients themselves. In all, she estimates that she contributed to the care of over 1000 people over three decades. Burks says that she, with the assistance of her daughter, buried more than 40 AIDS victims in Files Cemetery in Hot Springs. While her patients were still alive, Burks helped take them to appointments, obtain medications, apply for assistance, and arrange their funerals. She also kept supplies of AIDS medications such as zidovudine in her pantry, because, according to her, many local pharmacies were not willing to dispense such medications. In addition to her work with AIDS patients, Burks also handed out safe sex kits in known cruising spots.

Due to her work with AIDS, Burks and her daughter were shunned by their local community, and on two occasions crosses were burned in her yard by the Ku Klux Klan. Burks received financial assistance from gay bars in Arkansas, including the Discovery Club in Little Rock: "They would twirl up a drag show on Saturday night and here'd come the money. [...] That's how we'd buy medicine, that's how we'd pay rent. If it hadn't been for the drag queens, I don't know what we would have done." In 1988, Norman Jones, owner of the Discovery Club, created Helping People with AIDS, where Burks worked for several years. After the passing of the Ryan White CARE Act in 1990, which made care for people with HIV and AIDS more readily available, Burks struggled to find employment in the field due to her lack of professional qualifications, although during Bill Clinton's presidency, she did serve as a White House consultant for AIDS education.

Burks' patients lived around two years beyond the national average life expectancy for men diagnosed with AIDS at that time, catching the interest of the Centers for Disease Control and Prevention and the National Institutes of Health, which sent researchers to investigate.

== Post-AIDS crisis ==
Burks had buried her last AIDS patient by 1995. After medical care and social attitudes towards AIDS improved in the 1990s, Burks lived and worked in Florida as a fishing guide and funeral director. In 2012, Burks suffered a stroke and had to relearn many skills, including how to talk, read, write, and feed herself; the stroke also led to memory loss. Subsequently, she moved to Rogers, Arkansas, both in order to be closer to her family, and because health insurance would no longer cover her after her stroke.

In 2013, Burks advocated for three foster children who were removed from school due to rumors that one might be HIV-positive. As a result, the local community blackballed her, the funeral home she had previously worked at rescinded her standing job offer, and other businesses refused to hire her.

== Public recognition ==
Burks's story was initially publicized in a January 2015 cover story written by David Koon for the Arkansas Times, an Arkansas alternative weekly newspaper. The story gradually went viral, receiving a further boost in 2016 (Note: NBC News states that the story was published in Out in December 2016. However, it was at least made available digitally no later than May 19, 2016.) when Koon's profile was reprinted in Out magazine. She has since been profiled by a large number of media outlets.

In August 2016, Burks was honored at New York City's Pride Week by the charity Broadway Sings for Pride. She has spoken at Washington State University and Gonzaga University on her experiences. In 2017, Rose McGowan wrote and directed an unauthorized short film, Ruth, inspired by Burks' work.

=== Memoir and film ===
Burks' memoir, All the Young Men, co-authored with Kevin Carr O'Leary, was published in 2020, by Grove Press. The book was named as Book of the Day by The Guardian in January 2021. An adaptation of Burks' life, entitled The Book of Ruth and starring Ruth Wilson as Burks, was announced in 2020.

== Controversies ==
=== Monument fundraising ===
In November 2015, shortly after Burks's story was widely publicized, New Yorker Travis Dubreuil launched a GoFundMe campaign to raise money to build a monument to the men Burks had buried in Files Cemetery, a goal Burks had spoken of in the Arkansas Times article that brought her story to attention. The scope of the fundraiser was later enlarged to also cover some of Burks's medical expenses. By November 2017, the campaign was ended, having raised more than $75,000. According to Dubreuil, Burks cut off contact with him after he began inquiring about progress on the monument. Burks spoke of her plans for the monument in a number of interviews, but as of October 2021, no monument had been built. In July 2021, Burks, through her attorney, confirmed to the Arkansas Times that she still planned to construct the monument, and that she planned to devote the full $75,000 to the monument. She attributed the delay to a number of reasons including inexperience, and needing to devote time to her personal health and writing her memoir.

=== Disputed claims ===
A July 2021 article in the Arkansas Times raised questions about the veracity of some of the claims that Burks has made in interviews and in her memoir. NBC News published a follow-up investigation in October 2021, based on interviews with individuals connected to Burks and Hot Springs; Burks herself declined to be interviewed for the article. Interviewees generally concurred with the broad outlines of Burks's story and praised her work with AIDS patients, but suggested that some details had been exaggerated, including the number of men she buried, and her connection with Files Cemetery.

In different tellings of her story, the number of men Burks has said that she buried has ranged from "about two dozen" to "over 40". Some members of the gay community in Hot Springs have expressed frustration that Burks has yet to provide a list of the names of these men. In interviews, Burks has expressed her wish to build a monument at Files Cemetery with the names of the men she buried. In a 2021 statement to the Arkansas Times, Burks said that she had forgotten the names of some of the men. Burks's publisher stated to NBC that Burks intended to withhold the names of many of the men because they had desired not to be outed. Tim Looper, a longtime friend of Burks, stated that he had attended six burials, and was able to identify five men by name, all of whom had placards at the cemetery.

Burks has stated in her memoir and in interviews that she owns 262 burial plots at Files Cemetery, having inherited them from her mother who purchased them. Paula Bruce, a member of the Files family who maintains the cemetery, has disputed this, stating that no one owns plots in the cemetery, and that the land is deeded to the county. This was supported by reporting published by NBC, which also raised doubts as to whether the 0.767 acres (0.310 ha) cemetery had the capacity for 262 plots. Burks continued to affirm her position in a 2021 statement to the Arkansas Times.

In 2025, Southern Spaces published an article which sought to evaluate Burks' legacy and the criticisms made of her.
