= Nubia: Real One =

2021 DC Comics graphic novel

- Date: February 23, 2021
- Main characters: Nubia Johnson
- Publisher: DC Comics

Creative team
- Writers: L.L. McKinney
- Artists: Robyn Smith
- Colorist: Brie Henderson

Original publication
- Published in: Wonder Woman
- Date of publication: 2021
- Language: English
- ISBN: 1401296408

Nubia: Real One is a 2021 young adult graphic novel written by L.L. McKinney and illustrated by Robyn Smith. It centers on Nubia, Wonder Woman's twin sister. The book is a coming-of-age story that follows Nubia's attempts to keep her friends safe while keeping her superhuman abilities a secret. Nubia: Real One was released on February 23, 2021.

== Plot ==
The story follows 17-year-old Nubia Johnson, who tries to conceal her superhuman strength and speed. Nubia is put to the test when she attempts to keep her friend safe.

== Background ==
McKinney pitched the idea for a graphic novel to DC Comics, as she was a fan of the character Nubia from childhood. Nubia is Wonder Woman's twin sister and DC's first black woman superhero. She has made scant appearances in Wonder Woman comics since her 1973 introduction and "did not get the widespread recognition as Wonder Woman but many diehard comic fans of color love her".

The book was written and produced by three Black women: writer L.L. McKinney, illustrator Robyn Smith (who is Afro-Caribbean), and colorist Brie Henderson. McKinney said of the significance of centering a story about a black woman and described her depiction of Nubia as "strong, powerful, vulnerable, provided for, and most importantly, loved".

== Publication history ==
The book was released by DC Comics on February 23, 2021.

A sequel, titled Nubia: Too Real, was released on September 2, 2025.

== Critical reception ==
In a starred review, Publishers Weekly wrote: "Nubia's humorous awkwardness will resonate as readers marvel at her strength and sense of duty in a world that fails to protect her". Nubia: Real One also received positive reviews from Common Sense Media, NPR, and School Library Journal.

== Awards and nominations ==
- 2021 – Nominee, Best Children or Young Adult Book, Harvey Award
- 2022 – Winner, Best Comics Team, Ignyte Awards
