= Atlanta Black Star =

Online news site oriented towards African Americans

- Type: Weekly paper
- Owner: Diamond Diaspora Media
- Editor: Tracy Dornelly
- Founded: 2012
- Website: atlantablackstar.com

The Atlanta Black Star is the largest black-owned digital publication in the United States. The publication is based in Atlanta, Georgia, and focuses on the African American perspective on politics. It was founded in 2012 by Neil "Jelani" Nelson, Tracy Dornelly, and Andre Moore. The site has over 14 million monthly unique visitors.

Media outlets such as Yahoo News, The Washington Post, The New York Times, Heavy.com, and The Daily Dot have republished or cited the contents of the Atlanta Black Star. The site is part of a partnership program with Facebook.
