= John Birdsall (writer) =

American food writer

- Born: 1959/1960
- Notable works: The Man Who Ate Too Much (2020); What is Queer Food? (2025)
- Notable awards: James Beard Foundation Award (2014, 2016); Amber Hollibaugh Award (2016)

John Birdsall (born c. 1960) is an American writer. He is the author of The Man Who Ate Too Much (2020) and What is Queer Food? (2025); he also wrote Hawker Fare (2018) with James Syhabout. He has won two James Beard Foundation Awards, as well as the 2026 Amber Hollibaugh Award.

== Career ==
Birdsall began his career working in restaurants.

His writing career kicked off with his essay "America, Your Food Is So Gay", published in Lucky Peach in 2013. The essay highlighted closeted gay food writers of the twentieth century, including American chef James Beard (1903–1985), American food writer Richard Olney (1927–1999), and American restaurant critic and food journalist Craig Claiborne (1920–2000). According to Jaya Saxena, writing for Eater, this essay "essentially kicked off the queer food conversation". In 2014, "American, Your Food Is So Gay" won the James Beard Foundation Award for Food and Culture.

In 2016, Birdsall won the James Beard Foundation Award for Food and Culture again for his essay "Straight-Up Passing", originally published in Jerry.

Birdsall's debut book, The Man Who Ate Too Much: The Life of James Beard, is a biography of James Beard, published by W. W. Norton & Company on October 6, 2020. The book was well received by critics, including starred reviews from Kirkus Reviews, Library Journal, and Publishers Weekly. In 2021, The Man Who Ate Too Much was a finalist for the Lambda Literary Award for Gay Memoir or Biography, as well as the Randy Shilts Award.

In 2018, Birdsall co-authored Hawker Fare: Stories and Recipes from a Refugee Chef's Isan Thai & Lao Roots with James Syhabout. The book received a starred review from Publishers Weekly.

Birdsall published What Is Queer Food?: How We Served a Revolution with W. W. Norton & Company on June 3, 2025. Expanding on ideas from his earlier works, What Is Queer Food? connects food and queer history through the nineteenth and twentieth centuries. The book received a starred review from Publishers Weekly, and won the 2026 Amber Hollibaugh Award.

== Awards and honors ==
Awards for Birdsall's writing
Year	Title	Award	Result	Ref.
2014	"America, Your Food Is So Gay", Lucky Peach	James Beard Foundation Award for Food and Culture	Winner	
2016	"Straight-Up Passing", Jarry	James Beard Foundation Award for Food and Culture	Winner	
2021	The Man Who Ate Too Much	Lambda Literary Award for Gay Memoir or Biography	Finalist	
2021	The Man Who Ate Too Much	Randy Shilts Award	Finalist	
2026	What Is Queer Food?	Amber Hollibaugh Award	Winner	

== Personal life ==
Birdsall was born in 1959 or 1960. He grew up with his older brother and parents in a San Francisco suburb.

== Publications ==
- Birdsall, John (2020). The Man Who Ate Too Much: The Life of James Beard. Norton. ISBN 978-0-393-63571-3.
- Syhabout, James; Birdsall, John (2018). Hawker Fare: Stories and Recipes from a Refugee Chef's Isan Thai & Lao Roots. Photography by Eric Wolfinger. Ecco/Bourdain. ISBN 978-0-06-265609-4.
- Birdsall, John (2025). What Is Queer Food?: How We Served a Revolution. Norton. ISBN 978-1-324-07379-6.
