= Jacqueline Goldfinger =

American playwright

- Born: Tallahassee, Florida U.S.
- Education: MFA in screenwriting, University of Southern California; BA in English literature and theatre, Agnes Scott College
- Writing career
- Language: English
- Genres: Playwriting, Libretto, Poetry, Dramaturgy
- Website: www.jacquelinegoldfinger.com

Jacqueline Goldfinger is an American is a playwright, dramaturg, librettist, and poet. She’s best known for her Sci-Fi play “Babel” and Off-Broadway’s “Backwards Forwards Back.” Her awards include the Yale Prize, SmithPrize, and Opera America Discovery Award. Her plays have been produced at theaters including The Kennedy Center, École nationale de théâtre, and Court Theatre. Her opera and choral libretti have been performed at Sydney Opera House, Opera Columbus, Voces8, and others. Her poetry has been published in American Poetry Review, Queer Words Anthology, Poetry Wales and others. She wrote a poetry-play, The Arsonists. She wrote the bestseller “Playwriting with Purpose: A Guide and Workbook for Playwrights” for Routledge.
