= Amber Hollibaugh Award =

Literary award

- Awarded for: Nonfiction books with social justice themes
- Sponsored by: Publishing Triangle
- Reward: US$1,000
- Established: 2025
- Website: publishingtriangle.org/awards/amber-hollibaugh-award/

The Amber Hollibaugh Award for LGBTQ+ Social Justice Writing, established in 2025, is an annual literary award presented by the Publishing Triangle to "a nonfiction book that addresses issues such as economic injustice, with particular attention to queer youth and adult sex workers". Award recipients receive a US$1,000 prize.

The award honors American writer and political activist Amber L. Hollibaugh (1946–2023).

== Recipients ==
Award recipients
Year	Author	Title	Result	Ref.
2025	Johanna Hedva	How to Tell When We Will Die: On Pain, Disability and Doom	Winner	
2025	Neesha Powell-Ingabire	Come By Here: A Memoir in Essays from Georgia's Geechee Coast	Finalist	
2025	Vera Blossom	How to Fuck Like a Girl: Essays	Finalist	
2025	Vanessa Angélica Villarreal	Magical Realism: Essays On Music, Memory, Fantasy and Borders	Finalist	
2026	John Birdsall	What Is Queer Food?: How We Served a Revolution	Winner	
2026	Joelle Kidd	Jesusland: Stories from the Upside Down World of Christian Pop Culture	Finalist	
2026	Lewis Raven Wallace	Radical Unlearning: The Art and Science of Creating Change from Within	Finalist	
2026	Kaila Adia Story	The Rainbow Ain't Never Been Enuf: On the Myth of LGBTQ+ Solidarity	Finalist	
2026	Alyson Stoner	Semi Well-Adjusted Despite Literally Everything	Finalist	
