= Lady Dane Figueroa Edidi =

American playwright and actress

Lady Dane Figueroa Edidi is a playwright, actress, author, and choreographer from Baltimore, Maryland.

Edidi is the first trans woman of color nominated for a 2016 Helen Hayes Award for choreography, playwriting, and acting.

In recognition of her activism within the Washington, D.C. trans community, Edidi received a 2015 Emerging Leader Award and was the GLBT History Project's 2018 Mujeres en el Movimiento Arts Award recipient. Edidi received a 2021 Helen Merrill Award for playwriting.

== Work ==
- For Trans Black Girls …
- Klytmnestra: An Epic Slam Poem
