= Bishakh Som =

American cartoonist

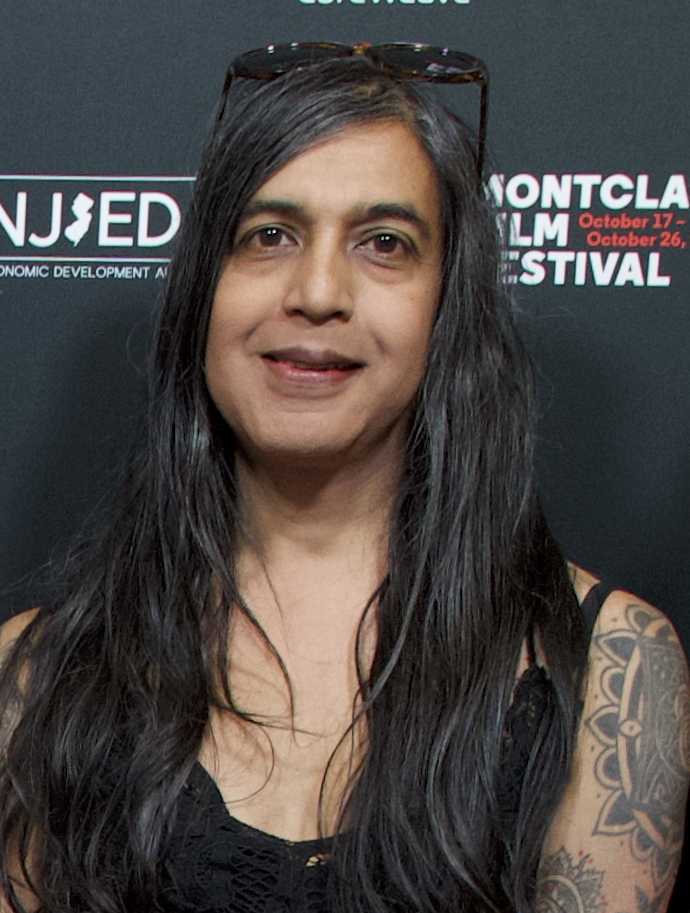
Som at the 2025 Montclair Film Festival

Bishakh Som (also known as Rani Som) is an Indian-American trans-femme cartoonist and graphic novelist based in Brooklyn, New York. Alongside her two published graphic novels, her work is published in The New Yorker and the Boston Review, among others. Her interests in architecture and her personal story continue to be featured throughout her artwork, notably containing investigations between figure, sexuality and architectural space. Her artwork is very colourful, it commonly uses watercolour and is detailed in ink line work

== Early life and education ==
Her parents immigrated from India to the US, where she grew up. Her experience growing up in an immigrant family in the US is shared throughout her graphic novels, often depicting South Asian characters searching for identity, and belonging in a foreign world.

Som formally trained in architecture at the Harvard Graduate School of Design and practiced architecture professionally before pursuing a successful career as a graphic novelist. Although she no longer practices architecture, her drawings often incorporate ideas of architectural and urban space.

In Som's words, she attributes the intention of her work as, "being able to jumpstart the images of queer/femme utopias into being, to have joyous femmes fully inhabiting, dancing, frolicking, thriving in a queer landscape."

== Architecture career ==
Som worked for the offices of Pei, Cobb, Freed & Partners, Charles T. Young, and Abby Suckle Architect between 1996 and 2011.

== Publications ==
Apsara Engine published by The Feminist Press in 2020, included eight short stories about a range of characters found in everyday reality. The watercolour illustrations envision alternative futures and intervene with ingrained social norms related to architecture, fetishism and heartbreak. Her second major publication is Spellbound, which was published by Street Noise Books in 2021. It is a graphic memoir, which she draws from her own life experiences, particularly processing her identity crisis and turning that into a story, a relatable instant for many immigrant children growing up in North America. The graphic novel blends a fantastical representation with real issues or mundane topics that occur in everyday life. An excerpt from Spellbound,

“…Or I could move to India, to cultivate a connection to—well, anything really—culture, family, history, some nebulous feeling, some sense of belonging I never had. Nostalgia for a past that never existed.” Through her art, Som has been able to “create small worlds that kick against the ugliness, hostility and mediocrity of 21st-century life—to manifest characters, words, colors, forms, symbols, patterns and rhythms that point to an aesthetic, one that has been shaped by all the visual and cultural touchstones that I’ve collected in my experience.”

She also contributed to The New Yorker, We’re Still Here (The first all-trans comics anthology), Beyond, vol. 2, The Strumpet, The Boston Review, illustrated for Deborah Schneiderman's book The Prefab Bathroom: An Architectural History, the Georgia Review, and VICE. She is a contributor in the 2026 Annotated Edition of Gender Queer: A Memoir.

== Awards and achievements ==
Som was awarded Xeric Grant in 2003 for her first self-published comic, Angel which included a series of short stories. Later, her graphic-novel, Apsara Engine received the Los Angeles Times Book Prize for Best Graphic Novel in 2020 and the 2021 Lambda Literary Award for Best LGBTQ Comics. She was also a 2021 Lambda finalist for her graphic memoir, Spellbound. Galleries such as, The Society of Illustrators, the Grady Alexis Gallery, De Cacaofabriek, and Art Omi have all exhibited her artwork.
