= NBC Out =

- Division of: NBC News
- Key people: Brooke Sopelsa (Managing editor)
- Founded: June 2016 (9 years ago)
- Area served: Worldwide

NBC Out is a digital portal on the NBC News web site featuring LGBTQ-centric news, stories, and other forms of content. The site launched in June 2016. Brooke Sopelsa, formerly a producer at HuffPost Live, serves as NBC Out's managing editor.

In 2017, NBC Out launched an annual "#Pride30" list, that showcases a member of the LGBTQ community for each day of Pride Month. Honorees were chosen from nominations by the public, LGBTQ celebrities, and community leaders.

In October 2025, NBC Out and several other NBC News verticals focusing on minority groups had their journalism teams cut as part of layoffs, with their remaining staff integrated into the main NBC News operation.
