= Mike Curato =

American writer and illustrator of children's books

- Education: Syracuse University (BFA)
- Writing career
- Notable awards: Lambda Literary Award for Children's and Young Adult Literature (2021); Lambda Literary Award for LGBTQ+ Comics (2026)

Mike Curato is a Filipino-American writer and illustrator of children's books. His graphic novel, Flamer, received a Lambda Literary Award for Children's and Young Adult Literature in 2021, and his graphic novel Gaysians won the 2026 Lambda Literary Award for LGBTQ+ Comics.

== Personal life ==
Curato was born and raised in the suburbs of New York City and currently lives in Brooklyn.

He received a bachelor of fine arts degree from Syracuse University before moving to Seattle to pursue a career as a graphic designer.

He is Filipino-American and was raised Catholic.

== Selected works ==
=== Little Elliot series (2014–2018) ===
The Little Elliot series follows an elephant named Elliot and consists of five books: Little Elliot, Big City (2015); Little Elliot, Big Family (2015); Little Elliot, Big Fun (2016); Little Elliot, Fall Friends (2017); and Merry Christmas, Little Elliot (2018).

Accolades for the Little Elliot books
Year	Book	Accolade	Result	Ref.
2014	Little Elliot, Big City	Society of Illustrators' Founder's Award	Winner	
2014	Little Elliot, Big City	Amazon's Best Books of 2014: Ages 3-5	Selection	
2014	Little Elliot, Big City	HuffPost's Best Picture Books: Most Charming	Winner	
2014	Little Elliot, Big City	PBS Best Picture Books	Honorable Mention	
2015	Little Elliot, Big City	Ezra Jack Keats Award: New Illustrator	Honor	
2015	Little Elliot, Big City	Communication Arts Award of Excellence: Illustration	Winner	
2015	Little Elliot, Big City	New Atlantic Independent Booksellers Association: Picture Book of the Year	Winner	
2015	Little Elliot, Big Family	Amazon's Best Books of 2015: Ages 3-5	Selection	
2016	Little Elliot, Big Family	Children's Book Council Children's Choice Illustrator	Finalist	
2016	Little Elliot, Big Family	NCTE Charlotte Huck Award	Recommended	
2016	Little Elliot, Big Family	IndieBound Indies Next List	Selection	
2017	Little Elliot, Fall Friends	HuffPost's Best Picture Books: Best Friendship/Kindness	Honorable Mention	

=== Flamer (2020) ===
Flamer is a semi-autobiographical graphic novel, published September 1, 2020 by Henry Holt and Company. The book has received various accolades, including the Lambda Literary Award for Children's and Young Adult Literature in 2021.

=== Gaysians (2025) ===
Gaysians is an adult graphic novel, published 2025 by Algonquin Books. The book has received various accolades, including the 2026 Stonewall Book Award - Barbara Gittings Literature Award, the 2026 GLAAD Media Award for Outstanding Original Graphic Novel/Anthology, and being selected for Kirkus Reviews' Best Fiction Books of the Year. It also won the 2026 Lambda Literary Award for LGBTQ+ Comics.

== Publications ==
=== Little Elliot series ===
- Little Elliot, Big City, published August 26, 2014 by Henry Holt and Company
- Little Elliot, Big Family, published October 6, 2015 by Henry Holt and Company
- Little Elliot, Big Fun, published August 30, 2016 by Henry Holt and Company
- Little Elliot, Fall Friends, published August 29, 2017 by Henry Holt and Company
- Merry Christmas, Little Elliot, published September 11, 2018 by Henry Holt and Company

=== Standalone books ===
- Flamer, published September 1, 2020 by Henry Holt and Company
- Where is Bina Bear?, expected to be published January 11, 2022 by Henry Holt and Company
- Gaysians, published 2025 by Algonquin Books

=== Illustrator ===
- Worm Loves Worm, written by J. J. Austrian and published January 5, 2016 by Balzer + Bray
- All the Way to Havana, written by Margarita Engle and published August 29, 2017 by Henry Holt and Company
- What If..., written by Samantha Berger and published April 10, 2018 by Little, Brown Books for Young Readers
- Sunny Day: A Celebration of Sesame Street, written by Joe Raposo; illustrated alongside Christian Robinson, Selina Alko, Brigette Barrager, Roger Bradford, Vanessa Brantley-Newton, Ziyue Chen, Joey Chu, Pat Cummings, Leo Espinosa, Tom Lichtenheld, Rafael López, Emily Winfield Martin, Joe Mathieu, Kenard Pak, Greg Pizzoli, Sean Qualls, and Dan Santat; and published October 22, 2019 by Random House Books for Young Readers
- The Power of One: Every Act of Kindness Counts, written by Trudy Ludwig, published August 25, 2020 by Alfred A. Knopf Books for Young Readers
- The Sharey Godmother, written by Samantha Berger and published April 13, 2021 by Imprint
- What Are You? written by Christian Trimmer and expected to be published October 18, 2022 by Roaring Brook Press
