= Flamer (novel) =

2020 graphic novel by Mike Curato

- Author: Mike Curato
- Language: English
- Genre: Graphic novel; Semi-autobiographical
- Publisher: Henry Holt and Company
- Publication date: September 1, 2020
- Publication place: United States
- Pages: 368
- Awards: Lambda Literary Award
- ISBN: 978-1-2508-0394-8
- OCLC: 1192495797

Flamer is a semi-autobiographical graphic novel by Mike Curato. It is set in 1995, in a Boy Scouts summer camp, and tells the story of Aiden, who is bullied for his appearance, including acting in a manner considered stereotypical of gay men. Curato was a scout and used his experience as a closeted teenager to write the novel.

The book was published in 2020 by Henry Holt and Company and was praised both for its emotional story and its artistic choices, such as the use of red tones for emotional moments while being mostly drawn in black and white. Flamer received a Lambda Literary Award in 2021 in the young adult category.

== Plot ==
The novel is set in 1995, when Aiden Navarro, a 14-year-old Filipino American teenager, goes through the last week of a Boy Scouts summer camp, before having to return home. Having just finished Catholic middle school, where he was constantly bullied for being overweight, biracial, and queer, Navarro is excited for his trip to the summer camp, where he has always felt appreciated by his friends as a good scout. Aiden considers the Boys Scout camp to be a safe space, where things are peaceful and predictable. He also enjoys going to the summer camp since it means being far from his abusive father.

Things are different this year, as the other boys he is spending time with are going through puberty, and spend their time trying to prove to each other who is more manly, which includes the use of homophobic slurs. Although Aiden attempts to be like these boys, his inability to fit in leaves him especially frustrated and upset.

While there, Aiden also writes to his pen pal, a girl named Violet, with whom he is very close and feels comfortable sharing more intimate subjects. In his letters, Aiden talks about the things he was taught in Catholic school, how homosexuality is morally wrong, and his romantic feelings for another camper, Elias.

Throughout the week, Navarro attempts to suppress his feelings towards Elias and himself, which leads to self-loathing and suicide ideation. Although Aiden manages to fight off the negative thoughts and emotions inside him in the end, he leaves the scout camp with the understanding that life for him will not be easy.

== Major themes ==
One of the subjects present in Mike Curato's debut graphic novel is the toxic masculinity and homophobia that Navarro contends with, which happens during his time at the Catholic school and while at the summer camp. This is also portrayed when Aiden attempts to fit in with his pubescent campmates by acting heterosexually and imitating their "homophobic, macho behaviour".

Flamer also deals with struggles of identity, as the main character, who had a Catholic upbringing, does not fully understand his feelings towards other boys, and has trouble accepting his own queerness, as he was taught that being gay is considered a sin. The bullying suffered by Aiden in school and during the summer camp causes his self-hatred to increase, which eventually leads to a breaking point where he begins to have suicidal thoughts.

== Background ==
Mike Curato began writing the script for Flamer in 2011. He worked on it as a side project for a few years, and in 2014 he worked full-time on Flamer and finished it. In 2015 he sold the publishing rights to the same editor responsible for his Little Elliot picture books. Afterward, Curato continued working on other projects until around 2018, when he returned to the graphic novel and began working on the illustrations in preparation for a release.

Aiden's experience includes being bullied for his effeminate voice and insinuations of being gay, which is based on Curato's own experiences as a closeted scout. Part of Curato's writing process involved looking at his old journals, sketchbooks, and photographs to relive old memories. He also had access to the letters he sent to his old pen pal, ranging from 1992 to the early 2000s. The same pen pal served as inspiration for Violet.

Curato lacked experience producing works similar to comic books. After sending the mockup for the novel to his agent, he had to add around thirty new pages to the final version for lack of space for the speech balloons. This alteration led to him expanding on the original story. Despite that, Curato was able to use his experience with picture books at other aspects of the creation process, such as "pacing, page turns, and compositional know-how." Graphic novels not being bound to the same limitations in page numbers as picture books also gave some additional freedom to the author when compared to his usual production.

The majority of the art in Flamer was made using black pencil and ink washes. For the pages where a fire was present, Curato utilized colored ink, which was then overlaid on top of the black and white art through Photoshop. Curato sought to use an art style he called "kind of rough", which was chosen to match the themes present in the book. This style differed from his usually polished one used for his children's picture books. While experimenting with this new style, Curato used other graphic novels as inspiration, including Stitches and The Kampung Boy.

=== Title of the book ===
Curato initially chose the word Flamer for the title of the novel due to its usage as a slur towards gay people, which was also used against him when he was a kid. The word is also integrated into the story both through its relation to fire, and also as an allegory to how certain words that used to be derogatory, such as queen, were eventually reclaimed by the LGBT community.

== Reception ==
The writing and design in Flamer were commended for the author's ability in conveying the emotions felt by the main character to the reader. In his review for The Horn Book Magazine, Roger Sutton mentions how the book "speaks so well to those kids currently undergoing the ordeal." Sutton also comments on the slow build-up of the story, showing the activities Aiden partakes in the camp, which "fully pull readers into Aiden's psyche". The review published by School Library Journal mentions the struggle that Aiden goes through in accepting himself by instead imitating the "macho behavior of other campers" to appear straight.

In her review for the NPR, Juanita Giles mentions the main character showing signs of not being able to accept being queer, and calls it "an astounding moment in an already astounding story." Giles also comments on the ending of the novel, and how, instead of all of Aiden's problems being solved, it shows him persevering over the challenges life had imposed on him. A review for the Bulletin of the Center for Children's Books goes over the suicidal ideation scene, and the powerful style shown by Curato in it. They also praise the "emotional wallop" caused by Curato's narration of Aiden's life and his use of "incendiary" colors alongside the black ink.

The Publishers Weekly review mentions how through the use of "straightforward, thick-lined art", the author "interweaves surrealistic, emotionally charged moments". Kirkus Reviews, in its verdict, called Flamer "a story that will be read and reread, and for some, it will be the defining book of their adolescence." Sarah Hunter, for The Booklist, wrote: "Masterfully nuanced and stunningly told, this is visual storytelling at its finest."

Curato's use of black and white for the everyday moments and red and orange tones for moments of intense emotion was specially praised by reviewers. Sarah Hunter writes that "deft artwork meticulously balances between blazing feelings and quiet contemplation." For the School Library Journal, the usage of colors to signify Aiden's "passion, rage, desire, and shame" is made even more explicit against the black and white illustrations. Kirkus Reviews called the illustrations "timeless moments of a remembered childhood." Roger Sutton also commented about the use of smaller panels for the storytelling, and the "full-page and double-page spreads for big moments", calling it "wonderfully effective."

=== Awards and honors ===
Flamer won the Lambda Literary Award for Children's and Young Adult Literature in its 33rd edition, held in 2021.

The book was also in The Horn Book Magazine's list of the best books of 2020, which states that it "winningly captures the joys of camp and young love while at the same time exploring the hopes and fears of the human heart."

=== Controversy ===
Flamer has been subject to widespread criticism by proponents of an unprecedented wave of book banning in the United States. PEN America reported that it had been banned in schools in at least six states during the 2021-2022 school year. In 2022, the American Library Association named it as the year's fourth most banned and challenged book in the United States due to inclusion of "LGBTQIA+ content" and "claims that it is sexually explicit." The following year, it was named the year's fifth-most banned and challenged book in the United States.

Flamer was listed among 52 books banned by the Alpine School District following the implementation of Utah law H.B. 374, "Sensitive Materials In Schools," many of which were considered to contain pornographic material according to the new law.

After a district parent filed a criminal complaint in August 2022 against Flamer's inclusion in the Jordan High School library in Katy, Texas, district police temporarily removed the book for an investigation. The book had already been deemed appropriate for high schools by a book review committee in March, and the police concurred with the committee's evaluation of the book's content.

Flamer was banned by the Siuslaw School District, in Oregon, and removed from the library in March 2025. In June 2025, the Harford County Board of Education in Maryland made Flamer the first book to be banned under a new district policy that allows parents to flag books they find objectionable, but the decision was reversed by the Maryland Board of Education. The book was also banned in Alberta and is to be removed from school libraries by October 2025.
