= Comic Arts Brooklyn =

Comic book festival in Brooklyn, New York

- Status: Indefinite hiatus
- Genre: Alternative comics convention
- Frequency: Annual
- Venue: Pratt Institute
- Locations: Brooklyn, New York
- Country: United States
- Inaugurated: November 9, 2013; 12 years ago
- Founder: Gabriel Fowler
- Most recent: November 2, 2019
- Organizer: Desert Island
- Website: comicartsbrooklyn.com

Comic Arts Brooklyn (CAB) was a comic book festival and art book fair organized by the comic book store Desert Island, held annually in Brooklyn, New York. Founded in 2013 as a successor to the Brooklyn Comics and Graphics Festival (BCGF), CAB focused on self-published, independent, and alternative comics.

== Programming ==
CAB was founded and organized by Gabriel Fowler, the owner of the comic book store Desert Island in Williamsburg, Brooklyn. The festival centered around a single-day, artist alley-style exhibition space that featured roughly 200 artists and comics publishers. The days leading up to and following CAB often included affiliated events, such as gallery exhibitions, art installations, and screenings.

Exhibition space at CAB was invitation-only; artists and vendors must either have applied and been accepted, or be invited to attend by the festival's organizers. Admission to the festival was free for members of the public.

== History ==
The Brooklyn Comics and Graphics Festival (BCGF), the predecessor to CAB, was inaugurated in 2009 by Fowler, comics critic and scholar Bill Kartalopoulos, and Dan Nadel, founder of the now-defunct publishing company PictureBox. The festival ran for four years, until Kartalopoulos and Nadel announced in May 2013 that they would no longer organize BCGF. In July 2013, Fowler announced the founding of Comic Arts Brooklyn, to be held in November of that year. CAB was inaugurated on November 9, 2013 at the Our Lady of Mt. Carmel Church in Brooklyn, New York – the same venue where BCGF was formerly held, and with many of the same exhibitors – with programming directed by Paul Karasik. CAB does not officially record attendance for the festival, though organizers have estimated the number of attendees per year as being "in the thousands."

In 2014, CAB expanded from one to two days of programming, with the additional day designated for panel discussions. Organizers considered placing CAB on hiatus in 2016, but instead opted to include fewer exhibitors and reduce the length of the festival to its original single day of programming. In 2017, CAB relocated from Our Lady of Mt. Carmel Church to the Pratt Institute, nearly doubling the size of its exhibition space.

The last CAB was held in 2019, after the planned 2020 show was cancelled due to the COVID-19 pandemic. The event has since been on "indefinite hiatus" due to multiple organizers having relocated from Brooklyn, and the Pratt Institute no longer permitting events held by outside organizations.

=== Event history ===
Dates	Primary Venue	Featured Guests
November 9, 2013	Our Lady of Mt. Carmel Church; Brooklyn, New York	Paul Auster, Michael DeForge, Lisa Hanawalt, David Mazzucchelli, Art Spiegelman, Adrian Tomine
November 8–9, 2014	Our Lady of Mt. Carmel Church; Brooklyn, New York	Josh Bayer, Charles Burns, Roz Chast, Michael DeForge, Julie Doucet, Aisha Franz, Lisa Hanawalt, Al Jaffee, Chip Kidd, Tim Lane, Benjamin Marra, Richard McGuire, Raymond Pettibon, James Romberger, Jim Rugg, Olivier Schrauwen, Dash Shaw, Art Spiegelman, Adrian Tomine, Marguerite Van Cook
November 7–8, 2015	Our Lady of Mt. Carmel Church; Brooklyn, New York	Derf Backderf, Brian Chippendale, Daniel Clowes, Jordan Crane, Michael DeForge, Bill Griffith, Sammy Harkham, Jennifer Hayden, Glenn Head, Jillian Tamaki, Denis Kitchen, Benjamin Marra, Matthew Thurber, Caroline Paquita, Nicole Rifkin, Yumi Sakugawa, Julia Wertz
November 5, 2016	Our Lady of Mt. Carmel Church; Brooklyn, New York	Doug Allen, Rick Altergott, Ariel Bordeaux, Dame Darcy, Drew Friedman, Matthew Thurber, Nicole Rifkin, Todd James
November 11, 2017	Pratt Institute; Brooklyn, New York	Alexis Beauclair, Charles Burns, DDOOGG, Jules Feiffer, Emil Ferris, Sophie Goldstein, Bill Griffith, Paul Karasik, Peter Kuper, Miss Lasko-Gross, Jane Mai, Mark Newgarden, Patrick Kyle, Richie Pope, Nicole Rifkin, Simon Hanselmann, Adrian Tomine, Chris Ware, Lale Westvind, Eric Kostiuk Williams, Ron Wimberly, Kelsey Wroten, Gina Wynbrandt
November 11, 2018	Pratt Institute; Brooklyn, New York	Doug Allen, Austin English, Charles Burns, Mike Diana, Julie Doucet, Simon Hanselmann, Frank Henenlotter, Todd James, Patrick Kyle, Xander Marro, Mark Newgarden, Dirt Palace, Ariel Schrag, Olivier Schrauwen, Nick Thorburn, Matthew Thurber, Lauren Weinstein, Jim Woodring
November 2, 2019	Pratt Institute; Brooklyn, New York	Nina Bunjevac, Charles Burns, Alfonso de Anda, Kim Deitch, Trinidad Escobar, Aline Kominsky-Crumb, Lawrence Lindell, Françoise Mouly, Anders Nilsen, Breena Nuñez, Dirt Palace, Gary Panter, Tommi Parrish, Minnie Phan, Frank Santoro, Daniel Shepard, Art Spiegelman, Tetsunori Tawaraya, Gibrán Turón, Chris Ware, Lauren Weinstein
