= 2019 in comics =

Notable events of 2019 in comics. It includes any relevant comics-related events, deaths of notable comics-related people, conventions and first issues by title.

== Events ==
=== January ===
- January 7: First installment of the comic strip Alley Oop written by Joey Alison Sayers and illustrated by Jonathan Lemon.
- January 25: Canadian-Dutch artist Maia Matches is inaugurated as the annual Stadstekenaar van Amsterdam (City Illustrator of Amsterdam).
- January: The final issue of the French comics magazine Psikopat is published.

=== February ===
- February 10: Wiley Miller's newspaper comic Non Sequitur causes controversy after a subliminal anti-Donald Trump message is spotted in one of the panels. Multiple newspapers discontinued carrying the strip in response.
- February 15: The oldest Danish comics store in the world, Fantask, in Copenhagen, announces it will close down in June after 47 years. Within two days a crowdfunding campaign saves the store from this fate and it continues its existence.
- February 20: Dutch comics writer Patty Klein is knighted in the Order of the Dutch Lion. She dies less than a month later.

=== March ===
- March 2: In Groningen, the Netherlands, the Dutch Comics Museum (Nederlands Stripmuseum) is closed down.
- March 3: After 43 years of non-stop publication, the final episode of Roger Fletcher's long-running comic series Torkan appears in print.
- March 23–24: During the Stripdagen in Utrecht Typex wins the Stripschapprijs. Ger Apeldoorn wins the P. Hans Frankfurtherprijs., while Henk Alleman receives the Bulletje en Boonestaakschaal.
- March 31: Jerry Van Amerongen's comic Ballard Street ends.

=== April ===
- April 2: Belgian cartoonist GAL receives an honorary doctorate from the Free University in Brussels.
- April 29: The New York Times gets caught up in controversy over two cartoons accused of antisemitism. Both target Israeli Prime Minister Benjamin Netanyahu. One is made by António Moreira Antunes, the other by Roar Hagen. As a result, the magazine announces that they will no longer publish syndicated editorial cartoons. Two months later they push this policy even further and decide to no longer publish any daily political cartoons.

=== May ===
- May 22:
  - In Orvelte, The Netherlands, a museum is opened dedicated to the work of Jan Kruis.
  - In front of the Hergé Museum in Louvain-La-Neuve, Belgium, a statue of Hergé, sculpted by Tom Frantzen, is erected.
- May 29:
  - In Hergé's birthplace Etterbeek a bust of his head is revealed.
  - French comics artist and illustrator Pascal Somon is sentenced for plagiarism and illegal copies of Tintin to the hefty sum of 32.000 euros (35.600 dollars) in damages.

=== June ===
- June 10: The New York Times announces that it will no longer publish daily political cartoons in its international edition from 1 July on, as a result over a controversial cartoon by António depicting Donald Trump as a lapdog of Israeli Prime Minister Benjamin Netanyahu two months earlier.
- Egyptian artist Ganzeer publishes his first graphic novel The Solar Grid.
- June 30: Canadian cartoonist Michael de Adder is fired from Brunswick News Inc. over a cartoon criticizing president Trump.

=== July ===
- July 3: It is announced that Mad Magazine will no longer publish original material from August on and disappear from the newsstands. It will only be available via subscription and direct markets, specializing on reprints, but with brand new covers. It will still publish occasional specials.
- July 3: Robert Kirkman unexpectedly ends his long-running comic, The Walking Dead, after 193 issues.

=== August ===
- August 16: The Guardian makes a controversy public regarding Marvel Comics who refused to publish an essay by Art Spiegelman, because of criticism in the text regarding U.S. President Donald Trump. Marvel claims they wanted to stay apolitical.

=== September ===
- September 5: Belgian comics writer Raoul Cauvin announces his retirement from scripting Les Tuniques Bleues.
- September 17: Diane Noomin releases the collective comic book Drawing Power: Women's Stories of Sexual Violence, Harassment and Survival, published by Harry N. Abrams. It features comics by women reflecting on personal encounters with sexual violence.
- September 24: The Dutch cartoonists collective Gorilla wins the Inktspotprijs for Best Political Cartoon.

=== October ===
- October 7: In Haarlem, the Netherlands, the first comics mural of the city is revealed, designed by Thé Tjong-Khing.
- October 23: Belgian comics publishers Standaard Uitgeverij and Ballon Media merge.

=== November ===
- November 13: The Dutch cartoonist duo Evert Kwok wins a court case against a man who sued them after they complained about his illegal and uncredited use of their cartoons on his site.

=== December ===
- December 2: Under pressure of Christian organisation CitizenGO, Dutch supermarket chain Dirk apologizes for offering the controversial graphic novel Jezus Christus Was Een Meisje by Jan Bart Dieperink as a prize, if customers buy an issue of their magazine Ditjes en Datjes.
- December 23: The Antwerp mini-theme park and exhibition Comics Station is sold to Studio 100.

=== Specific date unknown ===
- Julia Gfrörer publishes her graphic novel Vision.
- Antonia Pinnola, A.K.A. Acerotiburon, launches her autobiographical webcomic Waffley Wedded.
- The final episode of Arja Kajermo's gag comic Tuula is printed.

== Deaths ==
=== January ===
- January 1: Dagfinn Bakke, Finnish painter and comics artist, dies at age 85.
- January 8: Arturo Rojas de la Cámara, aka Rojas, Spanish comics artist (Cucharito, Nabucondonosor, Gedeon, El Genio Eustaquio, Agente 7-7 a la Izquierda, Centaurito, Aladino, Don Percebe y Basilio, Anibal), dies at age 88.
- January 10: Ron Smith, British comics artist (Judge Dredd), dies at age 94.
- January 12: Batton Lash, American comics writer and artist (Wolff & Byrd, Counselors of the Macabre, aka Supernatural Law, Archie Meets The Punisher, Obama Nation), dies at age 65 from brain cancer.
- January 15: Isaac del Rivero Sr., Spanish comics writer and artist, dies at age 87 or 88.
- January 16:
  - Pauli Heikkilä, Finnish novelist and comics artist (Vanhat herrat), dies at age 60.
  - Hanza Sanchō, Japanese comics artist, dies at age 90.
  - Denis Sire, French comics artist and illustrator (Menace Diabolique, Bois Willys), dies at age 65.
- January 18: Angel Del Arbol, Spanish comics artist (Sevla Rebelde, Aventuras Deportivas, Laura, Cuentos Gigante Tres Hadas, Macabro, comics based on Tom & Jerry), dies at age 82.
- January 19: Bort, Italian comics artist (Le Ultime Parole Famose), dies at age 92.
- January 28: Frans Buissink, Dutch painter, journalist and comics writer (Sjors en Sjimmie, Brammetje Bram), dies at age 75.
- January 29: Alex Barbier, French comics artist and painter (worked for Charlie Mensuel, Les Paysages de la Nuit, Comme un Poulet Sans Tête, dies at age 68.

=== February ===
- February 1: Ted Stearn, American animator and comics artist (Fuzz & Pluck, The Forgotten Dream of a Melancholy Chef), dies at age 57 from AIDS.
- February 2: Kakashi Oniyazu, Japanese comics artist (Though You May Burn to Ash, Date Ast Like), dies at an unknown age.
- February 8: Sérgio Tibúrcio Graciano, Brazilian comics artist (assistant of Mauricio de Sousa), dies at age 83.
- February 9: Tomi Ungerer, French novelist, illustrator, cartoonist and poster designer (The Three Robbers, Flat Stanley, Underground Sketchbook, The Party, Fornicon), dies at age 87.
- February 13: Annibale Casabianca, Italian comic artist (Miciolino, I Serpenti, drew Italian versions of The Phantom and Mandrake the Magician, worked for Sergio Rosi, Roy D'Ami and Alberto Giolitti), dies at age 89.
- February 15: Werner Hierl, German comics artist (Rolf Kauka), and animator (Bavaria Film), dies at age 88 or 89.
- February 17: Claude Renard, Belgian comics artist (Ivan Casablanca, 1914-1918, Les Anges de Mons) and teacher (founder of Atelier R), dies at age 72.
- February 18: Jacques Sandron, French comics artist (Godaille et Godasse, Raphaël et les Timbres), dies at age 76.
- February 19: Dee, Malaysian comics artist (Hello Bos), dies at age 52.
- February 20: Har Brok, Dutch journalist and writer (wrote various books about Hergé, among them: Kuifje, Van Leerlingjournalist tot Wereldberoemd Reporter), dies at age 76.
- February 21: Àngel Badia i Camps, Spanish painter, illustrator and comics artist (Pilaropo, created comics for Fleetway, Bruguera and Ricart), dies at age 89–90.
- February 25: Tadeusz Raczkiewicz, Polish cartoonist, comics writer and artist (Kusmider i Filo, Tajfun), dies at age 69.

=== March ===
- March 2: Sergio Tuis, Italian comics artist (La Pattuglia dei Bufali, Kirby Flint, Agente senza Nome, continued Martin Mystère), dies at age 83.
- March 6: Shigehisa Sunagawa, Japanese comics artist, dies at age 77.
- March 12: Tom K. Ryan, American comics artist (Tumbleweeds), dies at age 92.
- March 14: Augusto Cid, Spanish caricaturist, illustrator, sculptor and comics artist (Bicas e Bocas), dies at age 77.
- March 15:
  - Patty Klein, Dutch poet and comics writer (Noortje, Polletje Pluim, wrote for Panda, Sjors & Sjimmie, Schanulleke, the magazines Okki, Jippo, Taptoe, Rolf Kauka comics, Hanna-Barbera comics and Disney comics too), dies at age 73.
  - Toby Vos, Dutch comics artist and illustrator, dies at age 100.
- March 17: Ken Bald, American comics artist and illustrator (Namora, Judd Saxon, made comics adaptations of the TV series Dr. Kildare and Dark Shadows), dies at age 98.
- March 21: Pedro Alfonso Abelenda Escudero, or Abelenda, Spanish painter and comics artist, dies at age 87.
- March 23: Benno Vranken, Dutch comics artist (comics in the magazine Zone 5300, Walburg), dies at age 57.
- March 24: Olivier Cinna, French comics artist (La Fête des Morts, Ordures, Hibakusha), dies at age 46.
- March 27: Leslie Sternbergh, American comics artist, dies at age 58.
- March 29: Mark Alessi, American comics publisher (founder of CrossGen), dies at 65.
- March 31: Don Morgan, American animator and comics artist (Disney comics, assisted on Pogo), dies at age 80.

=== April ===
- April 2: Rolf Håndstad, Norwegian comics writer (Pyton), dies at age 60 from cancer.
- April 9: James D. Hudnall, American comics writer (Espers, Alpha Flight, Strikeforce: Morituri, Harsh Realm, Obama Nation), dies at age 61.
- April 11: Monkey Punch, Japanese comics artist (Lupin III, Pinky Panky), dies at age 81.
- April 15:
  - Malky McCormick, Scottish comics artist, caricaturist and postcard designer (The Big Yin), dies at age 76.
  - Ibrahim Tapa, Turkish comic artist (Zampara Moruk), dies at age 68 or 69.
- April 17: Kazuo Koike, Japanese comics writer (Lone Wolf and Cub, Hulk: The Manga, Lady Snowblood, Samurai Executioner, Nijitte Monogatari, Path of the Assassin, Hanappe Bazooka, Wounded Man, Mad Bull 34, Crying Freeman, Kawaite sōrō, X-Men Unlimited,...), dies at age 82.
- April 22: Greg Theakston, American illustrator, comics artist and restorator of classic comics, dies at age 65.
- April 23:
  - Jochen Arfert, German comics artist, dies at age 88.
  - Akihiko Takadera, Japanese comics artist, dies at age 68.
- April 28: Teva Harrison, Canadian-American comics writer and artist (In-Between Days), dies from breast cancer at age 42.
- April 29: Makoto Ogino, Japanese comics artist (Spirit Warrior), dies at age 59.

=== May ===
- May 10:
  - Jorge Longarón, Spanish illustrator and comics artist (Friday Foster), dies at age 86.
  - Miguel Anguel Repetto, Argentine-Spanish comics artist (continued the Tex Willer series), dies at age 90.
- May 18: Justin Ponsor, American comics colorist (Marvel Comics), dies at age 42 from cancer.
- May 20: Jürgen Kieser, German caricaturist, advertising illustrator, comics artist (Fix und Fax), dies at age 97.
- May 23: Alberico Motta, Italian comics artist (continued Chicchirichi, Cucciolo, Tiramolla, Laurel & Hardy comics, Disney comics, Tom & Jerry, Popeye, Felix the Cat), dies at age 81.
- May 26:
  - Alexis Dragonetti, Belgian publisher (CEO of comics and children's book publishing company Ballon Media), dies at age 50 in a car accident.
  - Everett Raymond Kinstler, American comics artist (worked on Zorro), dies at age 92.
- May 29: Josep María Blanco Ibarz, Spanish comics artist (Los Kakikus, La Familia Ulises, Patam Plaff, El Loco Pericos), dies at age 92.

=== June ===
- June 4: Rinaldo Traini, Italian comics promoter (co-organiser of the Salone Internazionale dei Comics festival) and comics writer (wrote for Guido Buzzelli, Roberto Diso and Corrado Mastantuono), dies at age 88.
- June 5: Helmut Nickel, German comics artist (Titanus, Don Pedro, Robinson Crusoë), dies at age 95.
- June 6: Kees Sparreboom, Dutch painter, illustrator and comics artist (Boot & Van Dijk and various autobiographical comics), dies from cancer at age 79.
- June 7: Reto Gloor, Swiss comics artist (Das Karma-Problem), dies at age 66.
- June 9: Fabien Lacaf, French screenwriter and comics artist (Les Patriotes), dies at age 65.
- June 16: José Colomer Fonts, Spanish comic artist (Disney comics), dies at age 76.
- June 22: Pieter Hermanides, Dutch painter and comics artist (De Draak van Bociti), dies at age 87.
- June 28: Kaj Pindal, Danish-Canadian comics artist and animator (Professor Phidus), dies at age 91.
- June 30:
  - Armando Salas Martinez, Spanish comics artist (El Eden), dies at age 73.
  - Guillermo Mordillo, Argentine cartoonist and animator, dies at age 86.

=== July ===
- July 11: Pepita Pardell, Spanish animator, cartoonist, illustrator and painter (worked for Ediciones Toray), dies at age 91.
- July 12: Klaas Knol, Dutch store employee (longest-serving employee of Amsterdam comics store Lambiek), dies at age 64.
- July 13: Ger Rijff, Dutch comics artist (De Vogels, Daan en Dodo, various sex parody comics, co-author of the Suske en Wiske spoof De Glunderende Gluurder), dies at age 67.
- July 26: Christian Gaty, French comic artist (Dany, Hôtesse de Paris, continued Barbe-Rouge), dies at age 94.
- July 29: Daniele Fagarazzi, AKA Dani, Italian animator and comic artist (Tilt, Otto Krunz, Bobo, continued Zio Boris, comics based on Calimero), dies at age 54.

=== August ===
- August 2: Ai Morinaga, Japanese comics artist (Your and My Secret, My Heavenly Hockey Club), dies at age 40.
- August 8: Ernie Colón, American comic book artist (Arak, Casper the Friendly Ghost, Richie Rich), dies from cancer at age 88.
- August 14: AkaB, Italian comics artist, dies at age 43.
- August 18: Giulio Chierchini, Italian comics writer and artist (Disney comics, worked on Fix und Foxi), dies at age 91.
- August 20: Larry Siegel, American theatrical, TV, comedy record and comics writer (Mad Magazine, Little Annie Fanny), dies at age 91.
- August 22: Dwi Koendoro, Indonesian comics artist and animator (Panji Koming, Legenda Sawung Kampret), dies at age 78.
- August 23: Massimo Mattioli, Italian comics artist (Pinky, Squeak the Mouse, M le Magicien, Lo Zoo Pazzo, Pasquino, Joe Galaxy), dies at age 75.
- August 27: Pedro Bell, American illustrator, animator and comics artist (drew comic strip-like album covers for George Clinton and a comic-strip review of a Deee-Lite concert), dies at age 69.
- August 31: Donald Rooum, British comics artist and journalist (Wildcat), dies at age 91.

=== September ===
- September 1: George Abe, Japanese comics writer (Rainbow: Nisha Rokubō no Shichnin), dies at age 82.
- September 5:
  - Charles Jarry, Belgian comics artist (Élodie d'Avray, Costa), dies at age 66.
  - Jaroslav Weigel, Czech playwright, writer, painter, actor and comics writer (Lips Tullian), dies at age 88.
- September 9: Kim Seong-hwan, South Korean comics artist (Gobau), dies at age 86.
- September 11: Daniel Johnston, American outsider musician and cartoonist (Space Ducks), dies at age 58 from a heart attack.
- September 12: Bill Schelly, American publisher (the fanzine Superheroes Anonymous, Sense of Wonder) and writer (The Golden Age of Comic Fandom), dies at age 67.
- September 27: Patrick Tandiang, French comics artist (Le Matin des Suaires Brûlés, Japper Jack), dies at age 58.

=== October ===
- October 1:
  - Jouko Innanen, Finnish cartoonist and comics artist (Into, Herra Kaaranen), dies at age 66.
  - Esther Takei, American comics artist (Ama-Chan), dies at age 94.
- October 5:
  - Rik Pareit, Belgian journalist and writer (wrote the book Geheimzinnige Sterren, over het Belgische Stripverhaal, about Belgian comics), dies at age 66 from prostate cancer.
  - Philippe Vandevelde, aka Philippe Tome, Belgian comics writer (Le Petit Spirou, Soda, continued Spirou et Fantasio) and artist (assistant of Dupa, Turk and Bob de Groot), dies at age 62 from a heart attack.
- October 13: Hideo Azuma, Japanese comics artist (Nanako SOS, Little Pollon, Disappearance Diary), dies at age 69.

=== November ===
- November 13: Tom Spurgeon, American comics writer (Wildwood), journalist, writer, critic (editor of The Comics Journal, 1994–1999) and blogger (The Comics Reporter), dies at age 50.
- November 19:
  - Purita Campos, Spanish comics artist (Patty's World), dies at age 82.
  - Tom Lyle, American comics artist (Starman, worked on the Robin spin-off), dies at age 66.
- November 21: Gahan Wilson, American illustrator, cartoonist, comics artist (worked for Playboy, National Lampoon), dies at age 89.
- November 22: Gaston Durnez, Belgian journalist, poet, writer and comics writer (De Geschiedenis van Sleenovia, came up with the name of the comics character Detective Van Zwam by Marc Sleen), dies at age 91.
- November 26:
  - Howard Cruse, American comics artist (Barefootz, Wendel, Stuck Rubber Baby), dies at age 75.
  - Sudhir Dar, Indian cartoonist and illustrator, dies at age 87.
- November 29: Serge Lindier, French comics artist (Alan), dies at age 67.
- Specific date in November unknown: Jean Marcellin, aka Couic, French comics artist and illustrator (La Famille Plantevigne, Caramba et Alonzo, Artimon et Siroco), dies at age 90 or 91.

=== December ===
- December 7: Dani Dacquin, Belgian comics artist (Adam en Eva, De Lotgevallen van Lotje, Yoeko), dies at age 84.
- December 8: Caroll Spinney, American puppeteer, voice actor, comics artist and animator (Harvey), dies at age 85.
- December 9: Patrice Ordas, French novelist and comics writer (wrote comics for Patrick Cothias), dies at age 68.
- December 19:
  - Jules Deelder, Dutch poet, orator and comics writer (wrote scripts for the comic book series Amber en Akka and Professor Hilarius, drawn by Rob Derks.) and inspired his own celebrity comic (Juul Deeldert, drawn by Vick Debergh), dies at age 75.
  - Freek Neirynck, Belgian theatre director, journalist, actor, writer and comics writer (wrote comics for Buth and Knut Kersse), dies at age 70.
- December 20: Gerry Alanguilan, Filipino comic book artist and writer (Wasted, Elmer, X-Men), dies at age 51.

== Exhibitions ==
- November 8–December 7: Galerie Martel (Paris, France) — "Guido Crepax"

== Conventions ==
- March 9–10: Big Apple Comic Con (Penn Plaza Pavilion, New York City) — comics guests: Frank Cho, Jenny Blake Isabella, Jim Steranko, Bill Griffith, Jae Lee, Diane Noomin, Arvell Jones, Mark Texeira, Dan Nokes, Larry Welz, Robert J. Sodaro, Peter Bagge, Joe Martino, Ramona Fradon, Reilly Brown, Adam Air Williams, Peter David, Sy Barry, John Orlando, Brian Kong, Bob Camp, J. David Spurlock, Timothy Truman, Larry Nemecek, Danny Fingeroth, James Sherman, Sean Chen, Jim Salicrup, Mike Diana, Cristian Aluas, Rodney Ramos, Keith Williams, Larry Stroman, Dan Fogel
- March 30: FLUKE Mini-Comics & Zine Festival (40 Watt, Athens, Georgia)
- April 4–6: International Comic Arts Forum (St. Ambrose University, Davenport, Iowa) — guests include Marnie Galloway, Rob Guillory, Jaime Hernandez, Fernando "KOHELL" Iglesias, Alberto Ledesma, and Ana Merino
- April 6–7: MoCCA Festival (Metropolitan West, New York City)
- April 27–28: Small Press and Alternative Comics Expo (S.P.A.C.E.) (Northland Performing Arts Center, Columbus, Ohio)
- May 18: ECBACC (East Coast Black Age of Comics Convention) (Temple University, Philadelphia, Pennsylvania)
- June 1–2: Chicago Alternative Comics Expo (CAKE) (Center on Halsted, Chicago, Illinois) — special guests: Ezra Claytan Daniels, Nicholas Gurewitch, Corinne Halbert, Michael Kupperman, Anders Nilsen, Ben Passmore, Aaron Renier, Isabella Rotman, Whit Taylor, Rosemary Valero-O'Connell
- September 14–15: Small Press Expo (SPX) (Bethesda North Marriott Hotel & Conference Center, North Bethesda, Maryland)
- September 26–29: Cartoon Crossroads Columbus (Columbus, Ohio) — special guests Natasha Alterici, Ho Che Anderson, Ezra Claytan Daniels, Terri Libenson, Tom Tomorrow, Frank Santoro, Dav Pilkey, Mike Mignola, Ann Telnaes, Liana Finck, Georgia Webber, M. K. Czerwiec, Rachel Lindsay, and Hilary Price
- October 12–13: STAPLE! (Millennium Youth Entertainment Complex, Austin, Texas)
- October 19–20: Massachusetts Independent Comics Expo [MICE] (University Hall, Lesley University, Cambridge, Massachusetts) — 10th anniversary event; guests include Jaime Hernández, Ellen Crenshaw, Colleen A.F. Venable, and Erica Henderson
- November 2: Comic Arts Brooklyn (Pratt Institute, Brooklyn, New York) — special guests Nina Bunjevac, Charles Burns, Alfonso de Anda, Kim Deitch, Trinidad Escobar, Aline Kominsky-Crumb, Lawrence Lindell, Françoise Mouly, Anders Nilsen, Breena Nuñez, Dirt Palace, Gary Panter, Tommi Parrish, Minnie Phan, Frank Santoro, Daniel Shepard, Art Spiegelman, Tetsunori Tawaraya, Gibrán Turón, Chris Ware, Lauren Weinstein
- November 9–10: Thought Bubble Festival (Harrogate Convention Centre, Harrogate, England) — guests include Jhonen Vasquez, Brian Azzarello, Jenn St-Onge, Luke Pearson, Mahmud A. Asrar, Kim-Joy, Marc Ellerby, Cameron Stewart, Sweeney Boo, Alison Sampson, Gemma Correll, Kieron Gillen, and Jamie McKelvie
- December 6–8: Steel City Con (Monroeville Convention Center, Monroeville, Pennsylvania) — guests include Wallace Shawn, Mark-Paul Gosselaar, Dustin Diamond, Tony Danza, Neve Campbell, Denise Richards, Joonas Suotamo, Carmen Electra, Sean Astin, Patrick Renna, Edward Furlong, Billy Boyd, Rachel True, Rachael Taylor, Richard Grieco, Anson Mount, Ethan Peck, Tom Bunk, Joe Simko, Trish Stratus, Lita, D-Von Dudley
- December 7–8: Comic Arts Los Angeles (Homenetmen Ararat, Los Angeles, California) — featured guest: Raúl the Third

== First issues by title ==
Archie vs. Predator II
Release July by Archie Comics and Dark Horse Comics. Writer: Alex de Campi Artist: Robert Hack
Going to the Chapel (Comic)
Released September by Action Lab Comics. Writer: David Pepose Artist: Gavin Guidry.
Spencer & Locke 2
Released May by Action Lab Comics. Writer: David Pepose Artist: Jorge Santiago, Jr.
