= Desert Island (comic shop) =

Comic book shop in New York City

Coordinates: 40°42′50″N 73°57′03″W

- Desert Island logo, designed by Jim Woodring.
- Company type: Private
- Industry: Retail
- Founded: February 2008; 18 years ago
- Founder: Gabriel Fowler
- Headquarters: 540 Metropolitan Avenue, United States
- Area served: Brooklyn, New York
- Products: Comics
- Website: http://www.desertislandbrooklyn.com

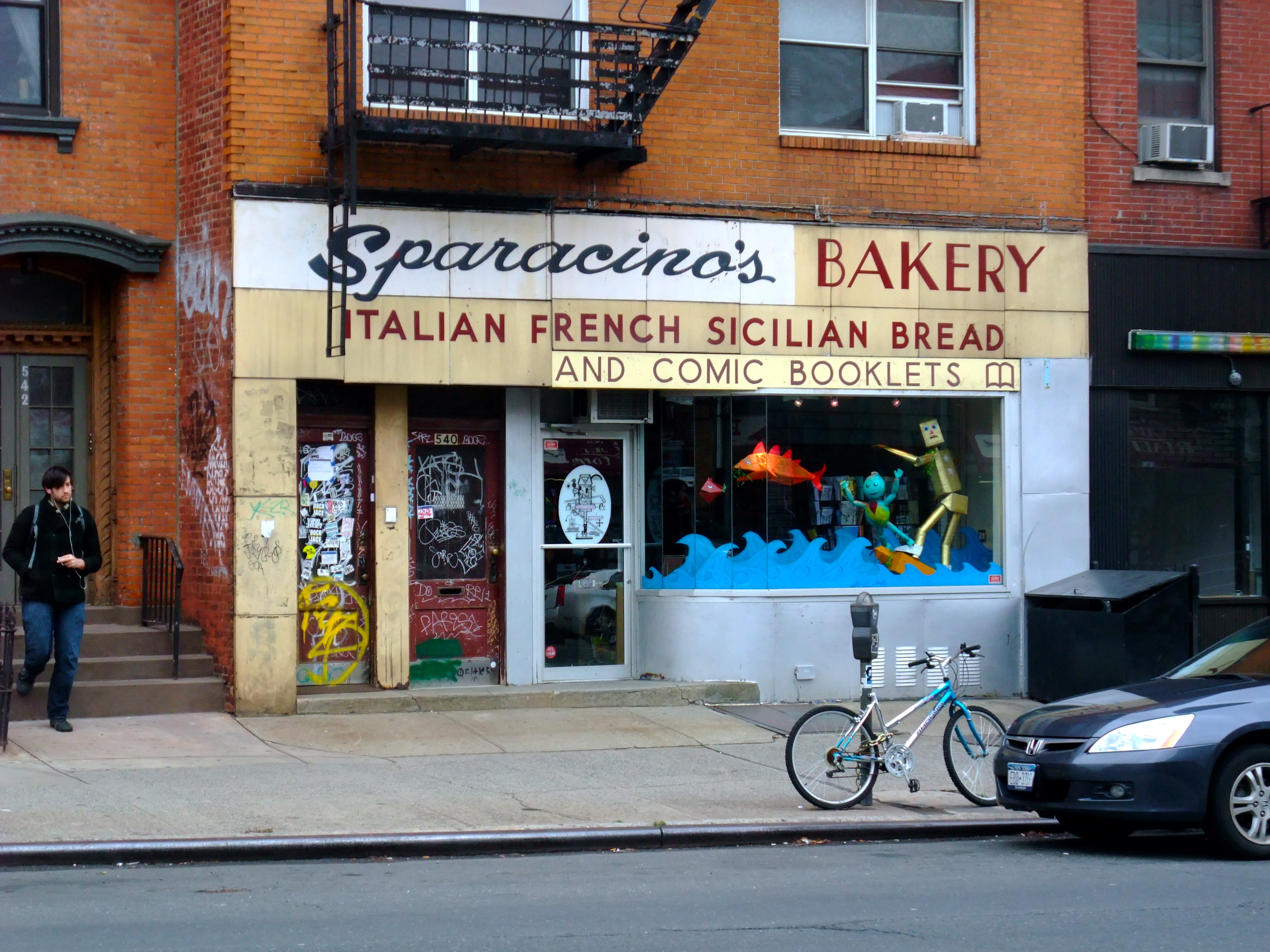
Desert Island in 2009

Desert Island is a comic shop in Williamsburg, Brooklyn, New York. The store focuses on underground and alternative comics, as well as independent and self-published comics sold through consignment. Desert Island also hosts the annual comic book festival Comic Arts Brooklyn, and publishes Smoke Signal, an independent comics anthology that has been nominated for an Eisner Award.

== History ==
Desert Island was founded by Gabriel Fowler in 2008 in response to the lack of alternative comics stores in New York. The store opened in a location formerly occupied by an Italian bakery, and maintains a modified version of the bakery's signage. The store stocks a wide variety of underground and alternative comics, zines, artist's books, graphic novels, art magazines, and screenprints, sold from both the store's own stock and on a consignment basis from individual artists. The store's "no-restrictions consignment" was inspired by the eclectic selection of Quimby's Bookstore in Chicago, which would open an additional location in New York in 2017 directly adjacent to Desert Island. The business's storefront features rotating displays and art pieces by comic artists, including Lauren Weinstein and Marie Lorenz.

Since 2013, Desert Island has organized Comic Arts Brooklyn, an annual comic book festival and art book fair. The store also publishes Smoke Signal, a free quarterly comics anthology newspaper. In 2014, Smoke Signal was nominated for an Eisner Award for Best Anthology. RESIST!, a special issue of Smoke Signal guest edited by Françoise Mouly, was distributed nationally at the Women's March in 2017. Desert Island also hosts a variety of special events, such as author signings and lectures.
