= Zornoza =

Zornoza is a Basque surname. Notable people with the surname include:

- Claudia Zornoza (born 1990), Spanish footballer
- Claudia Zornoza (born 1990), Peruvian badminton player
- Pippi Zornoza (born 1978), American artist
