= Kenwood Academy =

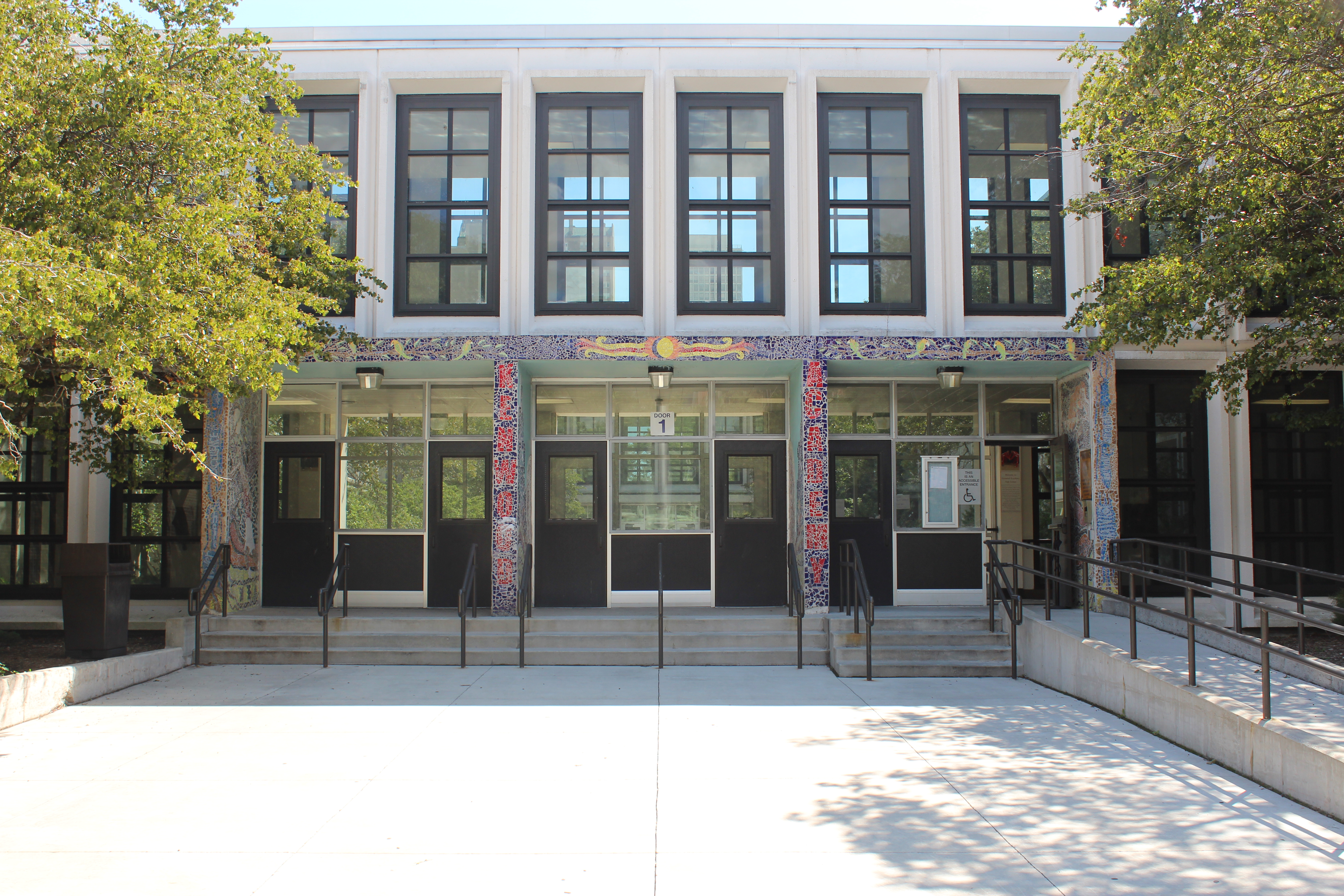

Location
- 5015 S. Blackstone Avenue; Chicago, Illinois 60615; United States; 41°48′12″N 87°35′23″W

Information
- Other name: Kenwood Academy High School
- Former name: Kenwood High School
- School type: Public; Secondary; Magnet
- Motto: "Our mission is COLLEGE!"
- Established: 1965
- School district: Chicago Public Schools
- CEEB code: 140917
- Principal: Karen A. Calloway
- Grades: 7–12
- Gender: Coed
- Enrollment: 2,173 (2025–2026)
- Campus type: Urban
- Colors: Columbia blue Red
- Athletics conference: Chicago Public League
- Team name: Broncos
- Accreditation: North Central Association of Colleges and Schools
- Newspaper: Kenwood Kaleidoscope
- Yearbook: Odyssey
- Website: kenwoodacademy.org

Kenwood Academy is a comprehensive public 4–year high school, with a middle school magnet program for gifted students, located in the Hyde Park/Kenwood neighborhood on the south side of Chicago, Illinois, United States. Operated by the Chicago Public Schools (CPS) district, Kenwood opened in temporary quarters in 1966 and in its permanent building in 1969. Kenwood Academy's neighborhood attendance boundary for admission to high school (9th grade) is Kenwood and Hyde Park: from Lake Michigan to Cottage Grove Avenue east to west, and 47th to the Midway Plaisance north to south. Kenwood was recognized as a "School of Distinction" for its academic achievement and a Model School by the International Center for Leadership in Education in 2004.

In addition to being a neighborhood high school, Kenwood has a city-wide magnet program that accepts students entering into 7th grade who pass a rigorous admissions test. The magnet program accepts students citywide using a random lottery with a standing of 6 or higher in both reading and math.

== History ==
The Chicago Public Schools (CPS) began the planning process to build Kenwood Academy, then called Kenwood High School, on November 3, 1965. With Northern big cities undergoing the final years of the baby boom, the CPS felt the need for a modernized new high school on Chicago's South Side. During the time of planning for the new school, CPS operated Kenwood Upper Grade Center, a neighborhood elementary school that was later converted into a high school to relieve overcrowding at nearby high schools in 1962. At the time, the school served 900 students in a building meant for only 500.

The question of whether to build Kenwood High School was the center of intense interest and tension for community members in Hyde Park, Kenwood, and Woodlawn who were concerned about the impact a new school would have on the racial composition of the surrounding neighborhoods and schools. Before the construction of Kenwood High School all students from these communities attended Hyde Park High School in Woodlawn. Community activists from Woodlawn argued that building a new high school in Hyde Park/Kenwood would drain all of the white students from Hyde Park High School, effectively segregating the school. These activists argued for an expansion of Hyde Park High School to alleviate overcrowding rather than the construction of a separate school. However, on November 17, 1966 the Chicago Board of Education approved the proposal to build Kenwood High School, on a site bordered by 51st Street to the south, Lake Park Avenue to the east, and Blackstone Avenue to the west, and near the Illinois Central Railroad.

Construction on the school began in March 1968. At $7.4 million, it was considered Chicago's most expensive high school at the time. The new school, situated at 5015 South Blackstone Avenue, opened in September 1969 with an enrollment of 700. The school's demographics during the first ten years was made up of 79% African-American and 21% White. The white population at the school continue to decline over the years, bringing the current demographics to 84% African-American, 5% white, 4% Hispanic, 3% Asian, and 4% multi-racial or other. Elizabeth Mollahan-Jochner, who had been the principal of Kenwood Upper Grade Center, served as the new Kenwood's principal, holding the position for 18 years from the school's opening until her retirement in June 1987. In recognition of the school's academic excellence and special programs, the Chicago Board of Education and CPS designated the school an "academy" and " a school of distinction" in 1977.

=== Demographics ===
As of the 2019–2020 school year, 85.8% of Kenwood's student body was African-American, 4.5% White, 4.8% Hispanic, 2.3% Asian, and 2.5% other. Low-income students made up 57.5% of Kenwood's student body. Kenwood had a 93% graduation rate.

== Curriculum ==
=== Academic Center ===
The Academic Center Program started as a way to introduce a select few 7th and 8th grade students to the high school environment before actually entering high school. Students in this program are referred to as "AC kids," as they are preparing for high school by taking high school courses before they graduate from the 8th grade. Students are offered the choice of staying at Kenwood Academy or attending any other high school with their credits and GPA. Students that choose to stay at Kenwood are granted the right, in their senior year, to take tuition-free courses at the University of Chicago. The academic center is now housed in the former Canter Middle School (formerly Louis Wirth Elementary School) building, which closed after the 2013–14 school year.

=== University of Chicago ===
Kenwood Academy students enrolled in Advanced Placement courses can access student resources on the University of Chicago's Hyde Park campus. University of Chicago students and professors have traditionally worked closely with Kenwood students in classes and on special projects. A recent example of a Kenwood Academy/University of Chicago relationship is the Program of Academic Excellence for High School Juniors at Kenwood Academy (the Kenwood Project). This program pairs Kenwood Academy juniors with professors at the University of Chicago, as mentors.

== Activities ==
=== Music department ===
The Kenwood Academy Concert Choir has performed locally and nationally at churches, colleges and universities, and vocal competitions nationwide. Oscar winner Denzel Washington and Grammy award winners The Winans have shared billings (at their own requests) with the Kenwood Academy Concert Choir. The Kenwood Concert Choir has performed for President Barack Obama. The Kenwood Academy Bands include the Jazz Ensemble (known as "Jazz At The Wood"), Jazz Combo, Concert Band, and the newly revived Marching Band (known as the "Marching Broncos"). Jazz At The Wood was the first CPS high school band to be invited to perform at the Annual Jazz Festival (located in Grant Park) in 2007. They have also performed for the Annual Hyde Park Jazz Festival, Golden Apple Awards, Ravinia, Hewitt and Associates and Room 43.

== Athletics ==
Kenwood competes in the Chicago Public League (CPL) and is a member of the Illinois High School Association (IHSA). Kenwood varsity athletic teams are named the "Broncos." The school's football field is not of regulation size, and thus no home games are played there. There are no stands or seats for spectators. The boys' swimming and diving team were Public League champions 14 times (1985–96, 1997–98, 1998–99, 1999–2000). Kenwood boys' track and field were Public league champions and Class AA 4 times (1972 indoor, 1982–83, 1983–84, 1985–86). Kenwood girls' swimming and diving were public league champions 8 times (1981–82, 1985–86, 1986–87, 1987–88, 1988–89, 1989–90, 1990–91, 1998–99). Kenwood boys’ football team won the Public league championship (2021–2022), the first time in the schools' history. On March 8, 2025, Kenwood's girls' basketball team won the IHSA Class 4A State Championship, defeating Fremd 65-44.

== Other information ==
On February 19, 1970, 22 students were arrested at the school when a crowd of 200 students staged a sit–in outside of the principal's office. The sit–in was part of an effort to get a student body to get implementation of manifesto. The students also wanted a social room in the school to be named in memory of the late Black Panther Party chairman Fred Hampton.

On February 15, 1972, 21-year-old Cornell Fitzpatrick was shot to death in the school by a white Chicago police officer Benard Martin, who was working as security at the school. According to the officer, the confrontation began when Fitzpatrick and a friend refused to leave the school after being asked repeatedly by the officer, which resulted in a physical altercation and Fitzpatrick's death. Eyewitness stories contradicted the officer's account of what occurred.

In October 1989, two male students were charged with attempted arson and reckless conduct when they intentionally started a fire at the school.

On October 2, 2003, the body of a newborn baby girl was found in a trash bin at the school by Chicago police officers. The baby had been discarded by a 14–year old student who had given birth in a bathroom at the school the previous day.

== Notable alumni ==
- Walter S. Arnold (class of 1971) – sculptor, stone carver
- Prashant Bhargava (class of 1990) – film director
- Quincy Black (class of 2002) – NFL linebacker (Tampa Bay Buccaneers)
- Lewis Bond (class of 2021) – NFL wide receiver for the Houston Texans
- Leah Borromeo (attended) – documentary filmmaker and journalist
- Marc Canter (attended) – software entrepreneur
- Da Brat (Shawntae Harris) (attended) – rapper, recording artist
- Kim English (attended) – dancer, musician
- Kerrie L. Holley (class of 1972) – IBM Fellow in IBM Research; IBM Black Engineer of the Year Award recipient 2003
- Eva Lewis (attended) – activist, advocate, poet
- Karen Lewis (class of 1971) – educator, president of the Chicago Teachers Union
- LisaRaye (attended) – actress, model and businesswoman
- R. Kelly (attended) – R&B singer-songwriter
- Chaka Khan (Yvette Stevens) (attended) – R&B/soul singer, recording artist
- Marquise Lightfoot (class of 2024) – college football defensive end for the Miami Hurricanes
- Nazr Mohammed (class of 1995) – NBA player, center (Chicago Bulls)
- Khalil Gibran Muhammad (class of 1989) – Harvard Kennedy School professor, Schomburg Center for Research in Black Culture director (2011–2016)
- Dara Norman (class of 1984) – astronomer, President of the American Astronomical Society
- Mandy Patinkin (class of 1970) – singer, television, film and Broadway actor
- Andrew Patner (class of 1977) – biographer, cultural critic
- Derrius Quarles (class of 2009) – entrepreneur, author, and designer
- Jesse Saunders (class of 1980) – DJ, record producer, film producer, entrepreneur
- Jacqueline Stewart (class of 1987) – film studies scholar, television presenter
- Juliana Stratton (class of 1983) – lawyer, politician, Democratic lieutenant governor of Illinois
- Latasha Thomas (attended) – alderman, 17th ward (Chicago, Illinois)
- Erica Watson (class of 1992) – actress, comedian and writer
- Jay Yuenger (attended) – guitarist (White Zombie)

== Notable staff ==
- Lena McLin – composer, author, and minister; music teacher and head of the music department (1969–1993).
