= Gina Wynbrandt =

American cartoonist

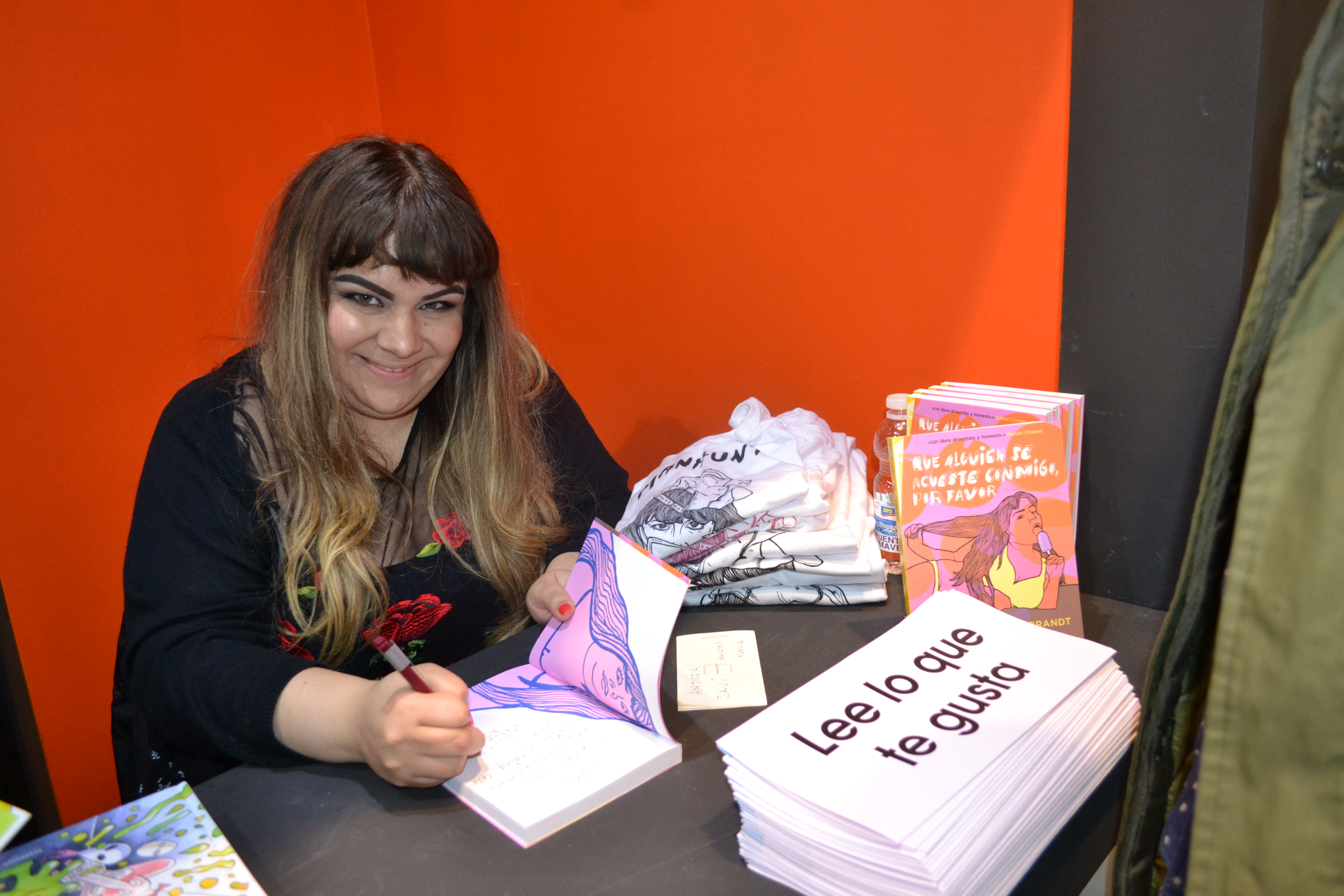
- Gina Wynbrandt at the 35th Barcelona International Comic Fair in 2017
- Born: 1990 (age 35–36) Chicago, Illinois, U.S.
- Area: Cartoonist
- Notable works: Someone Please Have Sex With Me

Gina Wynbrandt is an American comic book artist and illustrator.

== Background ==
Wynbrandt was born in Chicago, Illinois, in 1990. She is a graduate of Walter Payton College Prep and the School of the Art Institute of Chicago. She is the niece of comic book artist and software designer Mike Saenz.

== Career ==
Wynbrandt was nominated for an Ignatz Award in 2015 for Promising New Talent, based on the work in her minicomic Big Pussy. Her first graphic novel Someone Please Have Sex With Me was published by 2dcloud in 2016. In 2017, she was a featured guest at the Barcelona International Comic Fair and Comic Arts Brooklyn, and in 2018 she was a featured guest at the Chicago Alternative Comics Expo. In 2023, she was nominated for her second Ignatz Award for Outstanding Minicomic for her comic You're the Center of Attention. In 2024, her comic Goonight Phone for The Verge was nominated for an American Society of Magazine Editors National Magazine Award.

Her work has been printed in Best American Comics VICE Media, Lumpen, and The Believer, and shown at the Museum of Contemporary Art Chicago.
