= Uretsky =

Uretsky is a surname. Notable people with the surname include:

- Ben Uretsky, American businessman
- J.R. Uretsky (born 1985), American artist, performer, musician, and art curator
