= Cultural Traffic =

Multi-discipline arts fair

- Status: Active
- Genre: Art book fair
- Locations: London; New York; Detroit; Los Angeles; Miami
- Inaugurated: 7 October 2016
- Founder: Toby Mott
- Website: culturaltraffic.com

Cultural Traffic is a multi-discipline arts fair within the art book fair scene. It was inaugurated in October 2016 in London and has since held events in New York, Los Angeles, Detroit, and Miami. The fairs generally feature artists and dealers of counterculture media and art including books, zines, catalogues, posters, prints, tapes, vinyls, and others.

== History ==
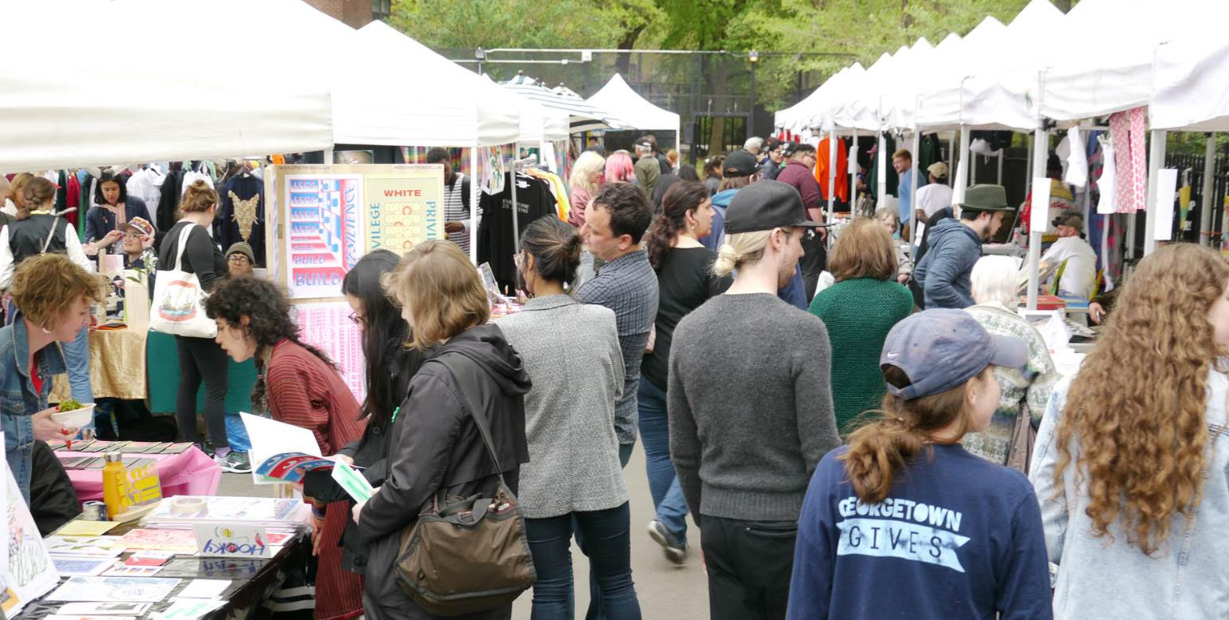
Cultural Traffic in New York in 2018.

Cultural Traffic was founded by Toby Mott in 2016. The first Cultural Traffic fair took place at Truman's Brewery in Shoreditch, London on 7 and 8 October 2016 during the Frieze Art Fair. Exhibitors included Mark Pawson, Book Works, Trolley Books, and numerous others. The John Marchant Gallery also presented Jamie Reid's collection of art and media from the punk era. Like all subsequent Cultural Traffic events, the inaugural one hosted book launches and exhibitions and featured lectures, live performances, and panel discussions. The second event also took place at Truman's Brewery on 17 and 18 December 2016. Exhibitors included the L-13 Light Industrial Workshop, Iain McKell, Erotic Review, and numerous others.

Another Cultural Traffic event took place at the Firstsite contemporary art gallery in Colchester on 18 February 2017. The event's first New York iteration took place on 7 May 2017 and was hosted at the Hester Street Fair on the Lower East Side in Manhattan. The fair featured 35 exhibitors including Jamie Reid who created two Donald Trump pieces for the event. Later in 2017, Cultural Traffic fairs were held in Los Angeles, London, and Miami (during Art Basel).

In May 2018, Cultural Traffic returned to the Hester Street Fair in Manhattan with over 50 exhibitors. Later that month, it held its first event in Detroit, which hosted the exhibition and the book launch for Kraftwerk: Dance Forever.
