= Vancouver Art Book Fair =

Book fair held in Vancouver, Canada

The Vancouver Art Book Fair (VABF) is a free annual multi-day exhibition of art books, magazines, zines and other forms of printed matter taking place in Vancouver, British Columbia. Established in 2012, VABF is the first and longest-running international art book fair in Canada, attracting vendors from BC and around the world. The fair features reading rooms, art projects, artist talks, and keynote speakers. The Vancouver Art Book Fair moved to the new Emily Carr University of Art and Design campus in 2018 after six years at the Vancouver Art Gallery. Founded by Tracy Stefanucci, VABF operates as a non-profit society and has included programming year-round, with a mission to establish Vancouver as a centre for artists' publishing.
