= Eva Lewis =

American activist

- Years active: 2016–present

Eva Maria Lewis is an American activist From South Side, Chicago, she has led a number of local protests, including the July 11, 2016 youth march on Millennium Park to protest police brutality. She has also founded two organizations, The I Project and Youth for Black Lives.

== Education ==
Lewis is a graduate of Walter Payton College Prep, and a student at University of Pennsylvania.

== Community activism ==
After the shooting of Trayvon Martin, Lewis protested for the first time, marching with her mother on Michigan Avenue (Chicago). Lewis became further engaged while attending high school at Walter Payton College Prep, after attending primary school in the less-affluent, majority African American South Side. In 2015, when she was a junior in high school, Lewis founded the non-profit The I Project. The I Project supports intersectional activism through art, with fundraising and community outreach. Events have included a photo shoot for people of all sizes and shapes, with a discussion of culture and body image, and a screening of Beyoncé's Lemonade with inter-generational panel discussion.

In 2016, Lewis joined three other black teen women activists to organize a youth sit-in in Chicago, to protest police shootings of people of color, particularly Alton Sterling and Philando Castile. The organizers rallied young community members on social media, with a Facebook event and the hashtag #BLMCHIYouth. The four organizers led a crowd of over 1,000 (some sources say 2,000) people in a peaceful sit-in in Millennium Park, and a march down Michigan Avenue and State Street (Chicago). There were no arrests, a symbolic victory because of the reputation of violence in Chicago, especially among youth of color, and a strained relationship between anti-racism activists and Chicago police. Following the march, Lewis and the organizers started Youth for Black Lives (Y4BL) to activate youth voices against systemic oppression. With Y4BL, Lewis organized a second march beginning in Millennium Park on August 7, 2016, to protest police brutality following the death of Paul O'Neal. In November 2016, in response to a deadly shooting in Mount Greenwood, Chicago where Joshua Beal, 25, of Indianapolis brandished a gun and failed to drop it after being instructed by a police sergeant; and text messages sent among students of Marist High School (Chicago, Illinois), Y4BL organized another march. However, Lewis and the organizers received threats on social media, and CPS leadership contacted the organizers parents, and the march was cancelled due to safety concerns. Instead, Y4BL organized meetings with Chicago Police Department Superintendent Eddie T. Johnson. The first, held on November 11, 2016, included Johnson, the Chief of Patrol, the Alderman of Mt. Greenwood, and the principal of Marist High School. During the first and subsequent meetings, Lewis and the other Y4BL members questioned Johnson and discussed racism and policing in Mt. Greenwood and Chicago at large.

== United Nations ==
Through her decade of involvement with the Girl Scouts of the USA, Lewis participated in the United Nations’ 60th Annual Commission on the Status of Women in New York in March 2016. Lewis spoke at the UN again in October 2016 for the United Nations' International Day of the Girl Child, performing spoken word during the opening of the event; she also gave a speech during the proceedings.

== Teen Vogue ==
Lewis contributed to Teen Vogue in 2016 and 2017, focusing on black women, intersectional feminism, and perceptions and approaches to handling violence in Chicago. She addresses social justice, especially for people of color.

== Awards ==
- Pioneer Award, Chicago Foundation for Women, March 2017
- Princeton Prize in Race Relations, April 2017
- Rising Star award, DuSable Museum of African American History, June 2017

== Publications and speeches ==
- Eva Lewis articles on Teen Vogue website
- ABC 7 Chicago interview with Lewis on The I Project
- Eva Lewis Opening Performance, U.N. International Day of the Girl Child, 2016
- Eva Lewis Speech, U.N. International Day of the Girl Child, 2016
- Chicago: A Land of Wilderness and Oasis | Eva Lewis | TEDxTeen
