= Ras Asan Olugbenga =

American businessman

Ras Asan Olugbenga (commonly known as Ras Asan), born as Derric James Studamire in Cleveland, Ohio (1990) is the co-founder of BREAUX and Company, a private equity social enterprise that is the majority shareholder and operator of BREAUX Capital, Million Dollar Scholar, DQ and Partners, and Techgroove Fest.

Olugbenga is the co-founder of and Co-Founder/Chief Marketing Officer of BREAUX Capital, a financial technology startup marketed specifically to African Americans, which provides a financial health platform where members can pool capital, invest collectively, and gain financial knowledge via peer networks. He was featured on the Black Enterprise's 2017 List of 100 Modern Men and named to the Inc. Magazine list of 30 Under 30 companies.

== Early life and education ==
In 2013, Olugbenga graduated cum laude from Morehouse College.

== Entrepreneurship ==
With Derrius Quarles, his business partner and Morehouse classmate, Olugbenga participated in business accelerator programs. Olugbenga and Quarles have partnered on ventures such as tech startups, co-hosting The Bridge radio show, community-based social ventures, private investments, and brand strategy consulting.

== Community Activism ==
After completing his degree, Olugbenga worked with Morehouse classmates and spearheaded the development of the Mogul Minds financial wealth-building curriculum to teach middle school and high school students wealth-building via business development and investing. He was also invited to join the board of the Concerned Citizen's Community Center in his hometown of Cleveland, Ohio. Alongside Marion "Nita" Gardner, he helped increase the budget of the Housing Dispute & Resolution Initiative to combat blighted properties in his home community of Mount Pleasant.
