= Kerrie Holley =

American computer scientist

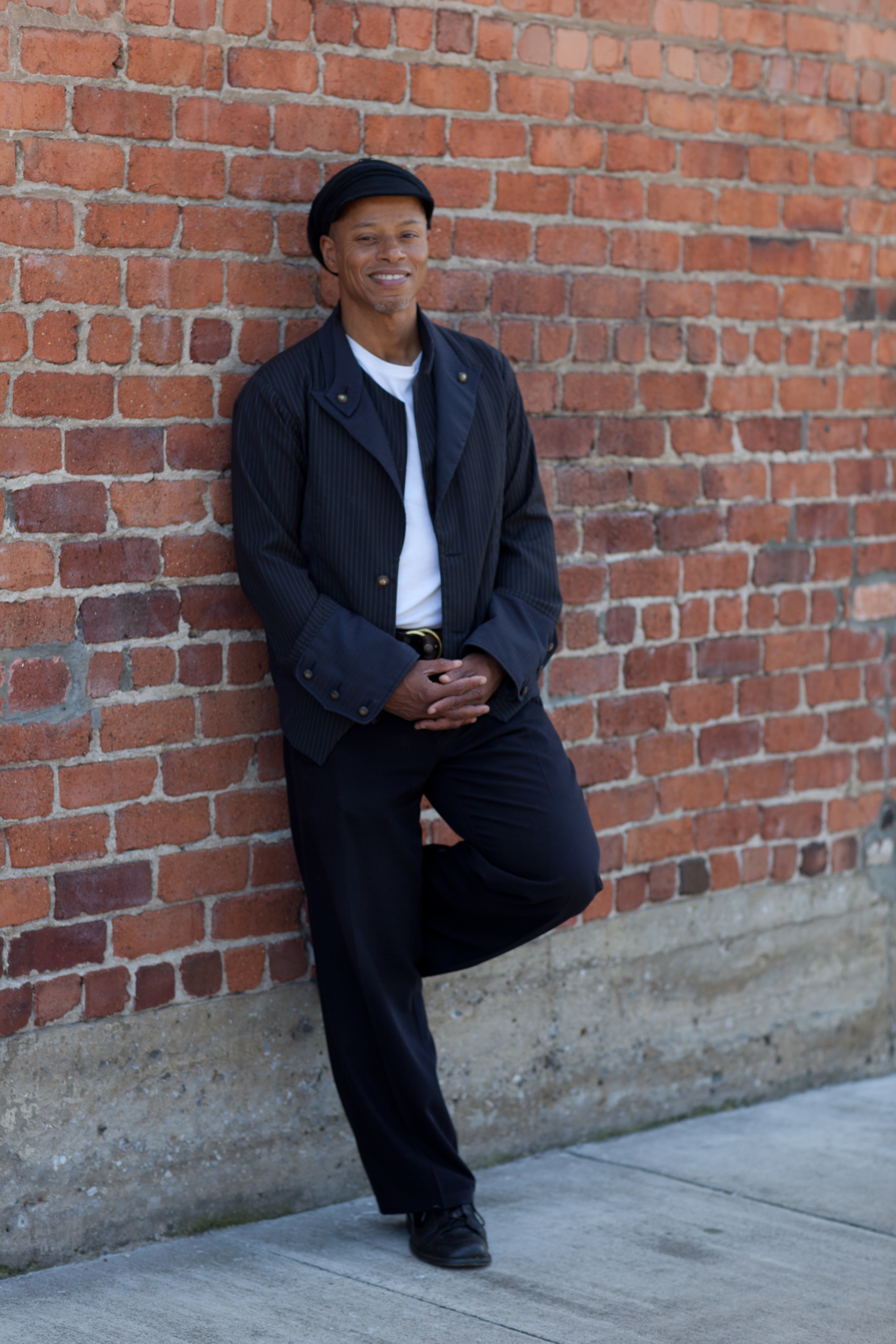
- Born: Kerrie Lamont Holley; Chicago, Illinois, U.S.
- Education: Kenwood Academy; B.A. DePaul University; Juris Doctor DePaul University
- Occupations: Tech Executive; Software engineer; Author; Inventor
- Years active: 1976–present
- Organizations: Google; UHG Optum; Cisco; IBM

Kerrie Lamont Holley (born 1954) is an American software engineer, author, and technology executive who is known for his pioneering work in service-oriented architecture (SOA) and his contributions to IBM's software development methodologies.

== Education ==
Holley received a B.A. in mathematics from DePaul University in 1976 and a Juris Doctor in Law from DePaul University in 1982. In 2016, Holley was conferred a Doctor of Humane Letters from DePaul University.

== Early life ==
Holley was raised by his maternal grandmother on Chicago's south side. He became a student at the Sue Duncan Children's Center in 1961 where he was tutored in math and science. As he excelled in the program, he became a tutor at the center, later tutoring former United States Secretary of Education, Arne Duncan and actor Michael Clarke Duncan.

== Career ==
Kerrie Holley became IBM's first African American Distinguished Engineer in 2000. Kerrie was appointed IBM Fellow in 2006.

Kerrie was a member of the Naval Studies Board and contributed to several reports.

Kerrie joined Cisco in 2016 as their Software Platform Group's VP and Chief Technology Officer.

In 2017 Kerrie joined United Health Group (UHG), Optum, as their first Technology Fellow and Senior Vice President focused on advancing and applying several technologies like artificial intelligence, deep learning, natural language processing, graph databases, IoT, genomics, and ambient computing.

Kerrie was inducted into the 2023 class of the National Academy of Engineering NAE for contributions to the evolution of service-oriented architectures, enabling global businesses to respond more quickly to changing market conditions.

Kerrie is a 2025 inductee into The National Inventors Hall of Fame for his inventions in Service Oriented Architecture.

== Awards and honors ==
- 2003 Black Engineer of the Year
- 2004 The 50 Most Important Blacks in Research Science
- 2005-2010 Naval Studies Board member
- 2016 Honorary Doctorate Degree
- 2023 National Academy of Engineering
- 2025 National Inventors Hall of Fame

=== Publications ===
Holley has authored several books throughout his career, sharing his expertise in various technological domains. In November 2010, Holley's first book, "100 SOA Questions: Asked and Answered," was published, describing how enterprises can adopt service-oriented architecture. His next book, "Is Your Company Ready for Cloud," co-authored with Pam Isom, was released in 2012, addressing the growing importance of cloud computing in business. In 2021, Holley wrote "AI First Healthcare," exploring the application of artificial intelligence in the healthcare sector. His most recent book, "LLMs and Generative AI for Healthcare: The Next Frontier," was published in 2024, reflecting his ongoing engagement with cutting-edge technologies and their impact on healthcare transformation.

=== Patents ===
Holley owns several patents ranging from how to maintain functionality when faced with component failure to how to locate lost mobile devices and software engineering patents in service-oriented architecture. Holley is a co-patent owner of the industry's first SOA development method and first SOA maturity model. The maturity model helps enterprises assess where they are on the road to adopting a Service-Oriented Architecture and provides a plan for achieving an SOA-based infrastructure.

== Selected publications ==
- Holley, Kerrie, and Manish Mathur, "LLMs and Generative AI for Healthcare, The Next Frontier." O'Reilly Media, 2024.
- Holley, Kerrie, and Siupo Becker. AI First Healthcare. O'Reilly Media, 2021.
- Holley, Kerrie, and Ali Arsanjani. 100 SOA Questions: Asked and Answered. Pearson Education, 2010.

Articles, a selection:

- State of Healthcare Technology (2021)
- Channabasavaiah, Kishore, Kerrie Holley, and Edward Tuggle. "Migrating to a service-oriented architecture." IBM DeveloperWorks 16 (2003).
- Crawford, C. H., Bate, G. P., Cherbakov, L., Holley, K., & Tsocanos, C. (2005). Toward an on-demand service-oriented architecture." IBM Systems Journal, 44(1), 81-107.
- Arsanjani, A., Ghosh, S., Allam, A., Abdollah, T., Ganapathy, S., & Holley, K. (2008). "SOMA: A method for developing service-oriented solutions." IBM systems Journal, 47(3), 377–396.
