= Die You Zombie Bastards! =

2007 film

- Poster
- Directed by: Caleb Emerson
- Written by: Haig Demarjian; Caleb Emerson
- Produced by: Haig Demarjian; Caleb Emerson
- Starring: Tim Gerstmar; Geoff Mosher; Pippi Zornoza
- Cinematography: Jarred Alterman
- Edited by: Daniel Strange
- Music by: Christopher Beal; Paul Leary; Tony Milano; Smokey Miles; Ian Ross
- Production company: Zombastic Productions Inc.
- Distributed by: Image Entertainment
- Release date: February 2005
- Running time: 97 minutes
- Country: United States
- Language: English

Die You Zombie Bastards! is a 2005 American superhero comedy horror film directed by Caleb Emerson, written by Emerson and Haig Demarjian, and starring Tim Gerstmar, Geoff Mosher, and Pippi Zornoza. It is about a serial killer (Gerstmar) who must save his cannibal wife Violet (Zornoza) from zombies animated by Baron Nefarious (Mosher).

== Plot ==
Serial killer Red Toole is married to Violet. After a night of killing innocent people, Red comes home to find that Violet has given him a gift: a superhero outfit made out of human skin. Red's joy is cut short when Baron Nefarious kidnaps Violet. Red puts on his superhero outfit and sets off to rescue his wife, before she is turned into a mindless zombie.

== Cast ==
- Tim Gerstmar as Red / Coconut Head Face Man / Mother Nefarious / Thierry Toole
- Geoff Mosher as Baron Nefarious
- Pippi Zornoza as Violet
- Jamie Gillis as Stavros
- Hasil Adkins as himself

== Production ==
The film was shot in Providence, Rhode Island. Production began while Emerson was still in film school and continued after his graduation.

== Release ==
Notable Film Festival screenings include:

- Lausanne Underground Film Festival 2005 (Winner: Best Feature Film)
- Fantasia (Montreal) 2006
- Backseat Film Festival 2006 (Winner: Best Feature Film, Best Title)
- Weekend of Fear (Erlangen, DE)
- Sci-Fi-London 2006
- Rhode Island Horror Film Festival 2006 (Winner: Best Feature Film)
- Tromanale (Berlin) 2005 (Winner: Best Feature Film, Best Screenplay, Best Actor (Tim Gerstmar))

The film was released on DVD on January 16, 2007.

== Reception ==
Bill Gibron of Pop Matters wrote that the film "is so expertly realized, so perfectly set within its own insular world that it's not long before you forget all the movie type muck-ups and simply enjoy the entertainment being offered." Bloody Disgusting rated the film 4/5 stars and wrote, "I for one have never been so shocked, disgusted, and strangely turned on by a film in all my life." Steve Barton of Dread Central rated it 3/5 stars and called it an absurd film similar to Troma's golden age of gratuitous violence and nudity. Michael Ferraro of Film Threat rated it 2.5/5 stars and called it an unfocused film similar to a sub-par Troma release. David Cornelius of DVD Talk rated it 1/5 stars and called it a Troma-inspired film that is an unwatchable mess. Writing in Zombie Movies: The Ultimate Guide, Glenn Kay called it "a rotten lowball effort" whose gags are "juvenile and tasteless". Peter Dendle, who wrote The Zombie Movie Encyclopedia, Volume 2, called it "ultra-camp shlock in the Troma tradition".
