= Walter Payton College Preparatory High School =

Public secondary school in Chicago, Illinois, United States

Location
- 1034 North Wells Street; Chicago, Illinois 60610; United States; 41.901389°N 87.634444°W

Information
- Type: Public; Secondary; Magnet
- Motto: "Courage, Character, Curiosity, Compassion"
- Established: 2000
- Oversight: Chicago Public Schools
- Principal: Fareeda J. Shabazz
- Grades: 9–12
- Gender: Coed
- Enrollment: 1,226 (2022–2023)
- Campus type: Urban
- Colors: Navy Blue; Orange
- Fight song: "Go, Go, Go Grizzlies"
- Mascot: Grizzlies
- National ranking: 52nd
- Newspaper: "The Paw Print"
- Website: wpcp.org

Walter Payton College Preparatory High School is a public four-year magnet high school located in the Old Town neighborhood on the near–north side of Chicago, Illinois, United States. Opened in 2000, Payton is operated by the Chicago Public Schools district. The school is named for Walter Payton, African-American football player for the Chicago Bears and humanitarian. From the years 2019-2025 Payton has been ranked the No. 1 public high school in the State of Illinois by U.S. & World Report.

== Background ==
Payton opened in 2000 by the Chicago Public Schools, The school is named for Chicago Bears star player Walter Payton (1953–1999). In addition to the school being named for Payton, the school colors are blue and orange (the colors of the Chicago Bears) and bear his jersey number (34) throughout the identity of the school. Payton is one of the city's eleven selective enrollment high schools. Payton is known for its advanced academic programs provided within an international model for teaching and learning. Payton Concert Choir was one of eight United States choirs to travel to the 2008 Olympics in Beijing.

=== Facilities ===
In May 2006, the Confucius Institute in Chicago was opened at Payton, as a partnership between Chicago Public Schools, the Office of Chinese Language Council International and Shanghai's East China Normal University. It is the only Confucius Institute in the nation to be housed in a high school.

== Academics ==
Payton has been ranked the No. 1 public high school in the State of Illinois by U.S. News & World Report since 2018. In 2015, Newsweek ranked it the top public high school in the state and No. 10 in the nation.

In recent years, Payton also has been the most difficult in which to gain admission among Chicago's elite selective enrollment schools, with freshman applicants needing a minimum cutoff score of 898 out of 900 points to make the first cut for the 2020-21 school year. In 2010, the school won the Intel School of Distinction awards in the categories of Excellence in Mathematics and Star Innovator for incorporating technology into classes, collaborative lesson and course planning, and use of Japanese Lesson Study.

== Demographics ==
As of the 2026–2027 school year, 30.59% of Payton's student body is Asian, 27.72% White, 24.36% Hispanic, 11.02% Black, 5.51% mixed and 0.72% Other. Low–income students make up 29.6% of Payton's student body. Payton has a 98% graduation rate.

== Athletics ==
Payton competes in the Chicago Public League and is a member of the Illinois High School Association. Payton varsity athletic teams are named the "Grizzlies." Payton's girls volleyball team has made three appearances in the Illinois High School Association Class 3A state finals, finishing fourth in 2009, 2011 and 2014. The girls' varsity tennis team won state championships in 2018 and has placed in cities multiple times. Payton boys' cross country team has been in the state meet twice; 2021 (placing 7th) and 2022 (placing 6th).

== Other information ==
On January 21, 2011, President Hu Jintao of China visited the school, where he saw the KAM and AP Chinese classes, and invited 20 faculty and students to China for the following summer. In September 2013, Chicago Mayor Rahm Emanuel announced plans to build a new annex behind the original building to house more students. The annex was completed and opened by the beginning of the 2016 school year. The annex features a new gym and a black box theater. The annex cost $17 million to build.

=== Controversies ===
In 2014, former Illinois Governor Bruce Rauner, then a first–time candidate for governor and resident of suburban Winnetka, Illinois, was forced to respond to reports on the campaign trail that he had used political clout to get one of his daughters admitted to Payton six years earlier. Rauner, a venture capitalist who had a second residence in Chicago, initially denied the reports. However, it was later revealed that Rauner had called then-Chicago Public Schools CEO Arne Duncan to overturn his daughter's initial rejection for admission. In 2009, the Rauner Family Foundation donated $250,000 to the Payton Prep Initiative for Education, the largest donation the not-for-profit had received up to that point.

==== 2019 yearbook incident ====
In May 2019, then–principal Timothy Devine ordered all of the yearbooks for the 2018-2019 school year reprinted due to contents showing students displaying the "ok" sign with their fingers below the waist, with the intention of getting others to look. It was believed by school officials that the "ok" hand gesture was a symbol of white supremacy. Reprinting of all of the yearbooks cost the administration $22,485.

==== Racism/decline in Black enrollment ====
According to an October 2019 news article published by WBEZ, Payton had dealt with a number of racist incidents, including Black students being called the "N-word" and bananas being thrown at them. In the same article, then-principal Timothy Devine claimed that the incidents were a natural product of students from different backgrounds being brought together. Payton’s Black enrollment dropped from 25% of the student body in the 2008–2009 school year, to 11% in the 2018–2019 school year; proportionally, this equates to a 56% decline in Black student population.

Devine stepped down to resume teaching and was replaced by Melissa Resh of Lake View High School beginning in the 2020–2021 school year. By May 2021, anonymous social media posts described the environment created by Resh’s administration as "a model of white supremacy culture." Subsequent anonymous posts expressed lack of support given to the BIPOC community at Payton, and Resh resigned at the end of academic year. She was replaced by Dr. Fareeda Shabazz–Anderson.

== Notable alumni ==
- Chris Eversley, college basketball player
- Eva Lewis, activist
- Sir Michael Rocks, rapper, member of The Cool Kids
- Gina Wynbrandt, comic book author and illustrator
