= Derrius Quarles =

Businessperson and human rights activist

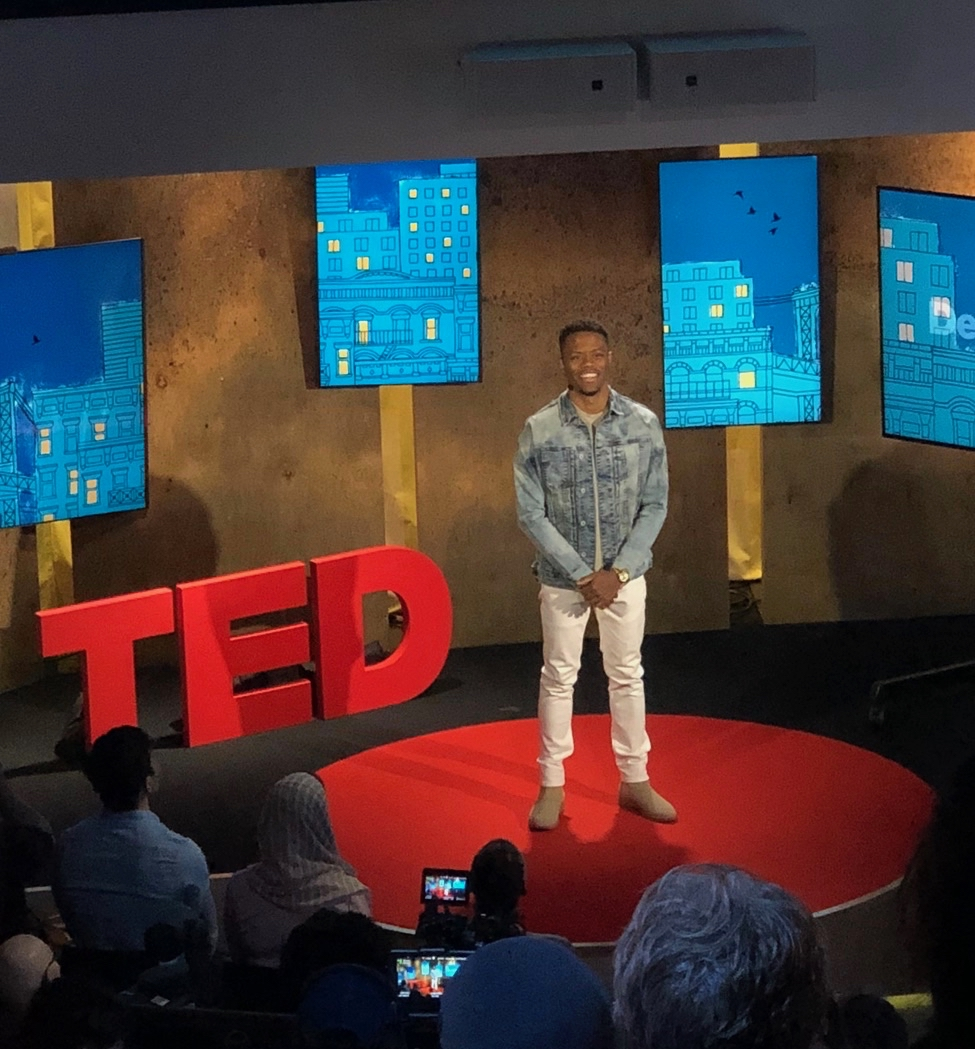
- Quarles speaking at TED Conference Headquarters in 2017
- Born: Derrius L. Quarles; Chicago, Illinois
- Education: Kenwood Academy; Morehouse College (B.A.); University of Pennsylvania (M.S.Ed)
- Occupations: Entrepreneur, human rights activist, digital marketer, recording artist
- Known for: Co-Founder of BREAUX Capital and Million Dollar Scholar
- Notable work: Million Dollar Scholar: Winning The Scholarship Race
- Spouse: Theodora Okiro Quarles
- Parent: Dr. Desmond L. Kemp
- Website: www.derriusquarles.com

Derrius Quarles is a entrepreneur, human rights activist, recording artist, product designer, and author. Born on the South Side of Chicago in the Bronzeville neighborhood, he is the Co-Founder and former Chief Executive Officer of BREAUX Capital, an award-winning financial technology company serving Black Men and Million Dollar Scholar, an education social enterprise as well as the Founder of DQ and Partners.

He is the author of Million Dollar Scholar: Winning The Scholarship Race, a guide for students seeking to gain scholarships and grants for college. Winning The Scholarship Race has assisted over 40,000 students across the globe in making higher education more affordable and went on to make the Amazon education bestseller list in the Counseling and Post-Secondary Guidance categories. Derrius' impact on higher education access through Winning The Scholarship Race have been featured on CNN, NBC News, and MTV2.

In 2013, Derrius was invited to the White House, where he was awarded the Points of Light Daily Points of Light Award from President Barack Obama for his education activism with Million Dollar Scholar.

In 2017 he was featured on the Black Enterprise List of 100 Modern Men and named an Entrepreneur-in-Residence at TED through the TED Residency Program. As a part of the residency, Derrius wrote and delivered the TED Talk "How banks are failing African-Americans". In 2018, Derrius Quarles and his company BREAUX Capital were named to the Inc. magazine list of 30 Under 30 companies.

Derrius has lectured, performed poetry, contributed to panel discussions, and facilitated workshops in over 30 US states. He travels the country speaking on various topics including race and Black culture, funding college and higher education, youth leadership development, the intersection of social justice and business, financial wellness, and child welfare advocacy. He has been a keynote speaker at various international organizations and venues including Harvard University, the United Nations, and the American College of Financial Services. The Associated Press, HuffPost, Time, and BET amongst others have highlighted his continuing activism and entrepreneurial innovation.

== Million Dollar Scholar ==
Quarles co-founded Million Dollar Scholar after being named a Scholar of the Gates Millennium Scholars Program, Coca-Cola Scholarship, and Dell Scholarship; Derrius competitively secured over 1.1 million dollars in scholarship awards before graduating from Kenwood Academy High School in 2009. He was coined "a million dollar scholar" by education journalist Stephanie Banchero of the Chicago Tribune. As a first-generation college student, he went on to attend and graduate cum laude from Morehouse College. During his matriculation at Morehouse, Derrius studied sociology, biology, and public health and wrote the thesis, Falling Through the Cracks which examined the United States' child welfare system and inequities in outcomes for Black foster youth. He and co-founder Ras Asan Olugbenga secured the majority of Million Dollar Scholar's early investments by winning top prizes from some of the most prestigious and competitive entrepreneurship competitions across the United States including the: Yale School of Management Education Business Plan Competition, Tavis Smiley Social Innovation Challenge, and Miller Lite's Tap the Future Competition. To date, Million Dollar Scholar has assisted students in gaining over $5,500,000 in scholarships and grants for post-secondary education through its online platform and impacted the lives of over 55,000 low-income students in the United States.

== BREAUX Capital ==
Derrius is the Co-Founder of BREAUX Capital, the first financial health platform and community for Black Men. The company provides Black Men a space "where Members can pool their savings, invest collectively, and gain financial knowledge via peer networks". BREAUX Capital has been awarded honors for its focus on Black men in the financial services and its business model. With Membership representing neighborhoods within Atlanta, Los Angeles, Raleigh-Durham, New York City, Chicago, New Orleans, Tucson, Houston, and Washington DC – BREAUX Capital serves a diverse client base across North America.

BREAUX Capital started after a conversation between Derrius and Ras Asan in 2015 and is built upon ethnographic and behavioral economics research led by Derrius while studying Education Entrepreneurship at the University of Pennsylvania Graduate School of Education. In May 2016, BREAUX Capital secured a grant from the National Science Foundation's I-Corps Program to perform market research and collect data on the overall financial wellness of Black millennials and the factors that impact the ability of Black millennials to be financially healthy. In April 2018, Inc. magazine included Derrius and BREAUX Capital co-founder Ras Asan on its list of 30 Under 30 entrepreneurs, highlighting their innovative business model of engaging Black male millennials to automate their savings for long-term asset accumulation.

== Books ==
- Million Dollar Scholar: Winning The Scholarship Race (2012) ISBN 978-1257647347
