= Dirt Palace =

Feminist art space in Providence, Rhode Island

The Dirt Palace
- Established: 2000
- Purpose: feminist art collective
- Coordinates: 41.8168393°N 71.4434534°W
- Leader: Xander Marro
- Leader: Pippi Zornoza
- Website: dirtpalace.org

The Dirt Palace is a feminist non-profit arts space founded in 2000. The Dirt Palace is located within a re-purposed library building in the Olneyville neighborhood of Providence, Rhode Island and includes living spaces, a wood shop, a print shop, practice spaces, studio spaces and a zine library. The collective's gallery space, The Storefront Window gallery, features work by residents and guest artists. Founding Members still involved with the project include Xander Marro and Pippi Zornoza. Artists who have participated in residencies at Dirt Palace include J.R. Uretsky, Mickey Zacchilli, and Jungil Hong.

In 2010, the collective was featured in the Museum of Modern Art's book, Modern Women: Women Artists at the Museum of Modern Art. The collective was also featured in the 2014 exhibit by Creative Time and Independent Curators International, Living as Form (Nomadic version) at Harvard University's Carpenter Center for the Visual Arts. In 2018, the Dirt Palace purchased the Wedding Cake House, and is currently renovating the building with the intent to establish a short term artist residency program supported by a bed and breakfast.

The collective has been identified as part of the new wave of radical feminist art spaces in A People's Art History of the United States, and as a part of the riot grrrl zine movement in Modern Women:Women Artists at the Modern Museum of Art. The Dirt Palace is a recipient of a seed grant from the Robert Rauschenberg Foundation.
