= Pippi Zornoza =

American artist

Pippi Anne Zornoza
- Born: 1978 (age 47–48)
- Education: Rhode Island School of Design
- Known for: Poster artist, co-founder of the Dirt Palace & Hive Archive
- Website: Pippi Zornoza official webpage

Pippi Anne Zornoza (born 1978) is an American interdisciplinary artist working in visual art, performance art, and music, and co-founder of the Providence-based artist collective Dirt Palace and Hive Archive.

== Biography ==
Zornoza received a B.F.A. degree in Printmaking from Rhode Island School of Design (RISD) in 2001. In 2016, she received a M.F.A degree in Art Practice from School of Visual Arts (SVA). She is the sister of novelist Andrew Zornoza.

The Dirt Palace, a feminist artist collective located in Olneyville, was co-founded in 2000 by Zornoza alongside Jo Dery, Xander Morro, Rachel Berube, Cara Hyde, and Michelle Marchese. It is a cooperative, affordable living space for seven female artists, working in various media.

She starred in the 2005 cult movie Die You Zombie Bastards!, a zombie comedy.

=== Visual art ===
Zornoza's visual art utilizes fabric, textiles and embroidery: her repetitive and intricate designs contain layered and repeating motifs of skulls, swords, birds and various predatory animals, inspired by the aesthetic commonly found associated with metal music.

Her art work has exhibited internationally in Argentina, Columbia and Sweden, and was published in the art-poster anthology book, The Art of Modern Rock.

In 2006, Zornoza was part of Wunderground: Providence, 1995 to the Present, at Rhode Island School of Design Museum featuring Providence poster art from 1995 to 2005 along other artists such as Brian Chippendale, Xander Marro, Jim Drain, Leif Goldberg, Jungil Hong, Erin Rosenthal and Mat Brinkman.

She was a Rhode Island State Council of the Arts (RISCA) 2007 Design Fellowship Recipient.

In 2008, a Museum of Modern Art (MoMA) sponsored show at P.S.1 featured Zornoza's work alongside then-current Dirt Palace artists.

In 2010, Guggenheim Curator Lauren Hinkson interviewed Zornoza on Contemporary Printmaking at the AS220 galley.

=== Music ===
Zornoza is also a percussionist and has played drums for the band Bonedust, which toured the U.S. in 2006; Throne of Blood (2002–03); and Sawzall (2001–02). Her most recent project is a collaboration with musician Chrissy Wolpert co-directing and co-producing a rock opera as Bonedust. She was also in the metal band Vvltvre, playing drums and vocals.
