= 2dcloud =

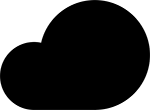
- Founded: 2007
- Founders: Maggie Umber and Raighne Hogan
- Country of origin: United States
- Headquarters location: Chicago
- Distribution: Consortium Book Sales & Distribution
- Publication types: books, zines, graphic novels
- Official website: http://2dcloud.com

2dcloud is a publisher of comic books, graphic novels and artist books based in Chicago. It was founded by Maggie Umber and Raighne Hogan in 2007.

== Publications ==
Year	Title	Author
2007	Good Minnesotan	Maggie Umber and Raighne Hogan, editors
2008	Good Minnesotan 2	Maggie Umber and Raighne Hogan, editors
2008	Yard Work	Maggie Umber
2008	Good Minnesotan 3	Maggie Umber and Raighne Hogan, editors
2009	Yearbooks	Nicholas Breutzman
2009	Manny + Bigfoot	Maggie Umber
2009	Beard Growing Contest	Raighne Hogan
2010	Good Minnesotan 4	Raighne Hogan, editor
2010	RDCD FIST	Justin Skarhus
2010	Short Rounds	Sara Tulius
2011	The Death of Elijah Lovejoy	Noah Van Sciver
2011	Motherlover	Nicholas Breutzman, John & Luke Holden, and Raighne Hogan
2011	Brothersister	Raighne Hogan, editor
2011	Arthur Turnkey vol. 1	Toby Jones
2011	Things You Carry	Vincent Stall
2012	Little Heart: A Comic Anthology for Marriage Equality	Raighne Hogan, editor
2012	Startled Maggie	Maggie Umber
2012	Ablatio Penis	Will Dinski
2012	Period	Christopher Adams
2012	RDCD FIST 1.5	Justin Skarhus
2012	Prizon Food part 1	Joseph Gillette, Eric Schuster
2012	Prizon Food part 2	Joseph Gillette, Eric Schuster
2012	Deep in the Woods	Noah Van Sciver and Nicholas Breutzman
2013	Strong Eye Contact	Christopher Adams
2013	Yule Log	Christopher Adams
2013	Out of Hollow Water	Anna Bongiovanni
2013	Abyss	Saman Bemel-Benrud
2014	Dragon's Breath and Other True Stories	MariNaomi
2014	Rudy	Mark Connery
2014	Detrimental Information	John & Luke Holden
2014	Comets Comets	Blaise Larmee
2014	I Don't Hate Your Guts	Noah Van Sciver
2014	Desk with Integrated Storage	Saman Bemel-Benrud
2014	Easter Island	Christopher Adams
2014	Goethe Institute	Blaise Larmee
2014	Great Heights	MariNaomi
2014	Rudy Mini	Mark Connery
2014	Looking Good	Will Dinski
2014	Pool Problems	Hannah Blumenreich
2014	Art Scrap Craft	Julie Doucet
2014	An Honest Performance	Will Dinski
2014	How it Happened	Jason T. Miles
2014	Cavities & Crevices	Anna Bongiovanni
2014	Harvest	Nicholas Breutzman
2014	Concupiscence	Vincent Stall
2014	The Arborist's Companion	Mayme Donsker
2015	3 Books	Blaise Larmee
2015	Qviet	Andy Burkholder
2015	Salz & Pfeffer	Emilie Gleason
2015	Big Pussy	Gina Wynbrandt
2015	Summer Carnival	Jake Terrell
2015	The Necrophilic Landscape	Tracy Auch
2015	Altcomics Magazine #1	Blaise Larmee, editor
2015	Time Capsule	Maggie Umber
2016	Altcomics Magazine #2	Blaise Larmee, editor
2016	Sec	Sarah Ferrick
2016	Mirror Mirror	Blaise Larmee, editor
2016	Gulag Casual	Austin English
2016	ITDN	Andy Burkholder
2016	Trying Not to Notice	Will Dinski
2016	Altcomics Magazine #3	Sab Meynert, editor
2016	Virus Tropical	Powerpaola
2016	Someone Please Have Sex With Me	Gina Wynbrandt
2016	Turning Japanese	Marinaomi
2016	Altcomics Magazine #4	Blaise Larmee, editor
2016	Secure Connect	Carta Monir
2016	Drone (2dcloud Edition)	Simon Hanselmann
2016	Extended Play	Jake Terrell
2016	Sprawling Heart	Sab Meynert
2016	Perfect Hair	Tommi Parrish
2017	Yours	Sarah Ferrick
2017	Sound of Snow Falling	Maggie Umber
2017	Mirror Mirror 2	Sean T. Collins and Julia Gfrörer, editors
2017	100	Nou
2017	Altcomics Magazine #5	Blaise Larmee, editor
2017	Architecture of an Atom	Juliacks
2017	Retreat	Jaakko Pallasvuo
2017	Lost in the Fun Zone	Leif Goldberg
2017	Kindling	Xia Gordon
2017	Altcomics Magazine #6	Blaise Larmee, editor
2017	By Monday I'll Be Floating in the Hudson with the Other Garbage	Laura Lannes
2017	2001	Blaise Larmee
2018	Gustave Flaubert Trois Contes	Christopher Adams
2018	A Tunnel to Another Place	Apolo Cacho
2018	It Felt Like Nothing	Fifi Martinez
2018	Wander Maunder	Justin Skarhus
2018	Vanishing Perspective	Alexis Beauclair
2018	Nocturne	Tara Booth
2018	Fluorescent Mud	Eli Howey
2018	270°	Maggie Umber
2020	Röhner	Max Baitinger
2020	Copy Kitty	Kyung-Me
2020	Mirror Mirror 3	Plum, editor
2023	Parc	Julie Gordon
2023	Frozengirl	Iku Kawaguchi
2023	The Necrophilic Landscape	Morgan Vogel
2023	Compact Magazine	Raighne & SH, editors
2024	Nuie	Nuie
2025	Egirl Magazine	Katherine Dee, illustrations by Kristina Tzekova, Blaise Larmee, Bubbles, Raighne
2025	East District	Ash H.G.
2025	Girls Gone Wild 1	Katie Lane
2025	La Poderosa 1	Powerpaola
2025	Altcomics Magazine #7	Blaise Larmee and Katie Lane, editors
2025	Mirror Mirror 4	Airplane Mode, editor
