= Princeton Prize in Race Relations =

Awards program of Princeton University

An awards program sponsored by Princeton University and principally undertaken by its alumni, the Princeton Prize in Race Relations (PPRR) honors high school age students who have done notable work in advancing the cause of race relations. The mission of the Princeton Prize is "to identify and recognize high-school-age students who significantly engage and challenge their schools or communities to advance racial equity in order to promote respect and understanding among all people." By recognizing, rewarding, and reinforcing the good work of students who are making a difference, the Princeton Prize hopes to promote better race relations now and to provide an impetus for other young people to work towards racial understanding in the future.

The Princeton Prize was initiated in the 2003/04 academic year, with pilot programs in the Boston and Washington, D.C. metropolitan areas. The program has grown dramatically since that time and is now nationwide. Today, PPRR operates in 28 regions nationally and also has an At-Large region to support areas not currently supporting a regional committee. In 2022/2023 academic year, Princeton University hosted the 2023 Princeton Prize in Race Relations award winners, 29 high school students from across the United States, during the annual Princeton Prize Symposium on Race held on campus in April.

The Princeton Prize in Race Relations is run by more than 400 Princeton alumni volunteers. Since its founding in 2003, it has awarded over 500 Prizes and more than 1500 Certificates of Accomplishment to high school students for their work in standing up to intolerance and encouraging connection and community.

It is hoped that the Princeton Prize will ultimately evolve into a nationally recognized awards program to which any high school age student in the country can apply.

Each of the Princeton Prize in Race Relations recipients receives an award of $1,000 and is invited to participate in a Symposium on Race. The Princeton Prize in Race Relations, together with a cash award of up to $1,000, is offered to those applicants doing the best work in each locale. In addition, other worthy applicants are honored with “Certificates of Accomplishment.” All honorees are recognized at their schools’ awards assemblies and at area-wide recognition events.

The Princeton Prize in Race Relations is overseen by a national board consisting primarily of Princeton alumni, but also comprising Princeton University staff members and current undergraduates. The Princeton Prize Board is a committee of the Alumni Association of the Princeton University, the umbrella organization for all of Princeton's alumni activities. In addition, a local committee is established in each region where the Princeton Prize operates. These committees consist primarily – though not exclusively – of Princeton alumni.

Other local committee members may include educators and other individuals who are involved in race related matters in their communities. The local committees operate under the aegis of the Princeton alumni club or association in each area. Currently sit on the National Board: Chair (2024): Steven D. Marcus '10, Vice Chair (2023): Selah Hampton '18, Secretary (2023): K. Malaika Walton '87, Treasurer (2023): Gari Pai '99, Emeritus Board Members: Henry Von Kohorn '66 and George Bustin '70
