= Marie Lorenz =

American artist

Marie Lorenz is an artist in Brooklyn, New York. Her work focuses on discarded objects in urban spaces, such as the rivers of New York. She also navigates these waterways and records her experiences with video and photography.

== Career ==
Marie Lorenz has an MFA from Yale School of Art at Yale University. She is a recipient of a Joseph H. Hazen Rome Prize from the American Academy in Rome and a Creative Capital award.

Lorenz's had a project called the Tide and Current Taxi. She studies the tides and uses them to propel her homemade rowboat around New York, often taking passengers.

In 2015, Lorenz created an exhibition for Artpace in San Antonio, Texas. It consisted of sculptures made from casts of debris found on the coastline. She has also exhibited at the Everson Museum of Art. Her work is included in the permanent collection of the Pérez Art Museum Miami, Florida.
