= Xander Marro =

American artist, underground puppet maker, and arts non-profit director

- Born: 1975 (age 50–51)
- Education: Brown University
- Known for: performance art, activism, film animation
- Website: xandermarro.com

Xander Marro (born 1975) is an American artist, underground puppet maker, and arts non-profit director based in Providence, Rhode Island.

== Work ==
She is a member of the Dirt Palace, a feminist art collective, where she makes movies, puppet shows, prints, and phone calls. She curated the long-running "Movies with Live Soundtracks" series and toured with "Bird Songs of the Bauharoque," a two-woman puppet operetta starring her alter-egos, Lady Longarms and Madame von Temper Tantrum, as well as the alter-ego of Becky Stark, who is Marro's other half in the band Lavender Diamond. In her spare time she works as the Managing Director of Providence Not-for-Profit arts organization AS220. She graduated from Brown University in Art/Semiotics.

Marro is described by the Providence Phoenix as a "puppet-maker and projectionist steeped in the underground."

== See also ==
- Pippi Zornoza
