= Olivier Schrauwen =

Belgian comic artist and musician

- Born: 1977 (age 48–49) Bruges, Belgium
- Areas: Writer, Artist
- Notable works: Arsène Schrauwen (2014); Parallel Lives (2018); Sunday (2024)
- Awards: Bronzen Adhemar (2026)

Olivier Schrauwen (born 1977) is a Belgian cartoonist residing in Berlin. Known for his formal experimentation, surreal narrative style, and expressive use of color and paneling, Schrauwen has earned broad critical acclaim within the international graphic novel community. Cartoonist Art Spiegelman characterized him as "the most original cartoonist I've fallen onto since Chris Ware or Ben Katchor."

== Early life and education ==
Schrauwen was born in Bruges, Belgium, in 1977. He pursued formal artistic training in Ghent, studying animation at the Royal Academy of Fine Arts (KASK), followed by studies in comic-strip drawing at the Sint-Lukas School of Arts in Brussels.

== Career ==
After completing his studies, Schrauwen initially worked in animated film before transitioning into comic art. He released his debut book, My Boy, in 2006, which drew visual and stylistic inspiration from early 20th-century newspaper strips such as Winsor McCay's Little Nemo in Slumberland.

Schrauwen's international breakthrough expanded through publications with American publisher Fantagraphics Books. His 2014 graphic novel Arsène Schrauwen, a fictionalized, surreal biography detailing his grandfather's time in a Belgian colony, was well received by critics.

In 2024, Schrauwen published Sunday, a 474-page slice-of-life graphic novel depicting a single day in the life of a fictionalized relative named Thibault, which received international acclaim.

== Awards and accolades ==
- Best Graphic Novels of 2024 – The New York Times, The Washington Post, and The Guardian (for Sunday)
- Bronzen Adhemar (2026) – Awarded for his body of work in Flemish comics
- Fumetto dell'anno 2026 – Lucca Comics & Games 2026 (for Sunday)

== Selected bibliography ==
- My Boy (2006, Bries Publishing)
- The Man Who Grew His Beard (2011, Fantagraphics) ISBN 9781606994467
- Mowgli's Mirror (2011, Retrofit Comics)
- Arsène Schrauwen (2014, Fantagraphics) ISBN 9798875000928
- Parallel Lives (2018, Fantagraphics) ISBN 9781683961406
- Portrait of a Drunk (2019, Fantagraphics) – with Ruppert and Mulot ISBN 9781683962892
- Sunday (2024, Fantagraphics) ISBN 9781683969679
