= Mickey Zacchilli =

American cartoonist and voice actor

- Born: 1983 (age 42–43)
- Area: Cartoonist
- Notable works: RAV; Space Academy 123

Mickey Zacchilli is an American comics artist and voice actor, currently known for portraying the character Little Destiny in the adult animated television series Adventure Time: Fionna and Cake. She has been nominated for three Ignatz Awards, including as an editor for Outstanding Anthology with Lovers Only in 2018, Outstanding Graphic Novel with RAV in 2015, and Outstanding Minicomic with RAV #6 in 2012.

== Biography ==
Zacchilli grew up in Massachusetts before attending Rhode Island School of Design for screen printing in Providence, Rhode Island, where she currently resides.

Her interest in comics began with newspaper comic strips and X-Men before reading Skeleton Key and discovering manga and anime, including Ranma ½.

Zacchilli self-published her first comic series, Bullshit Frank and Gorilla Joe, while working at a café. Editions of her work, including her series RAV, were risograph-printed and had screen-printed covers, which helped attract attention to her work at comic book conventions including Small Press Expo.

Zacchilli, also a musician, has performed with the band Clear Leader, and as a solo artist under the name Dungeon Broads.

Zacchilli is a practitioner of Brazilian jiu-jitsu, and earned her black belt under instruction from former Ultimate Fighting Championship competitor Eric Spicely.

== Bibliography ==
- Bullshit Frank and Gorilla Joe (2011), self-published
- RAV 1st Collection (2014), Youth in Decline
- RAV 2nd Collection (2017), Youth in Decline
- Space Academy 123 (2018), Koyama Press

== Voice acting filmography ==
Year	Title	Role
2021	Tuca & Bertie	Bartender (season 2, episode 5 "Vibe Check")
2023	Glorious Wrestling Alliance	Miranda Fury
2023	Adventure Time: Fionna and Cake	Little Destiny, additional voices
