= J.R. Uretsky =

American artist

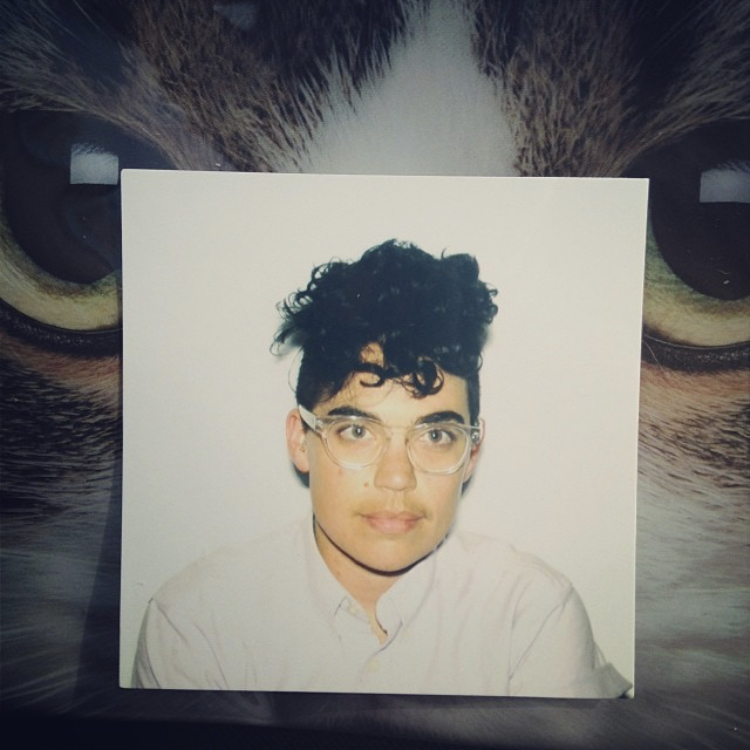
- Born: Jamie Uretsky; 1985 (age 40–41)
- Occupations: artist, musician, museum curator
- Known for: puppetry, performance art, textile art, sound art, video art, queer punk music
- Spouse: Cartoonist Penina Gal
- Website: jruretsky.com

J. R. Uretsky is an artist, performer, musician and art curator living in Providence, Rhode Island.

== Education ==
Uretsky earned her bachelor's degree in studio art at Biola University, her master's degree in fine arts in sculpture at the University of Connecticut, and her graduate certificate in Museum Studies at Harvard University.

== Work ==
Uretsky uses puppetry, textile art, sound, video and performance to create "expressive confessions," evoking emotions in the audience. Her work has been exhibited nationally and internationally. Her work was included in the 2013 DeCordova Biennial at The DeCordova Sculpture Park and Museum. She has also performed and exhibited at Art Basel in Miami, Florida, the Carpenter Center for the Visual Arts at Harvard University, the Rhode Island School of Design Museum as well as the Museum of Art and Design in New York. Uretsky's work has been published by print, online and video journals such as Headmaster Magazine, Gaga Stigmata, Big Red & Shiny and ASPECT: The Chronicle of New Media Art.

Uretsky performs in queer punk band, Bed Death and J.R. and the Worship Band. Her musical influences include Bad Brains, Pedro the Lion and David Bazan. Her other collaborations include an art band called Feminist Conference with drummer and visual artist Rachel Blumberg and cellist Emily Dix Thomas.

In addition to being the curator at the New Bedford Art Museum, Uretsky has curated exhibits at Artspace in New Haven, Connecticut, AS220 and the Wedding Cake House (Dirt Palace) in Providence, Rhode Island, and the Distillery Gallery in Boston, Massachusetts.

An active member of the Providence creative community, Uretsky sits on the Dirt Palace Public Projects Board of Trustees.

== Awards ==
- 2018 YWCA Woman of Distinction Award for her dedication to uplifting the creative expressions of people of color, women, and LGBTQ individuals.
- 2013, deCordova Biennial
- 2012–2013 Artist-in-residence, Dirt Palace
- 2015 On Our Radar, CREATIVE CAPITAL
- 2009–2011 Graduate Fellowship, University of Connecticut

== Bibliography ==
- Eli, Phillip. "Katy Perry, tighty-whities, and fine art from Ocean State Job Lot." Providence Phoenix.Feb 26, 2014.
- Glaser, Brian Christopher. "Inside Out: JR Uretsky." Big Red & Shiny. December 3, 2012.
- McQuaid, Cate. "A Woman's Arms a Refreshing Show of Force," The Boston Globe. April 15, 2014.
- McQuaid, Cate. "Some standouts in Locally Made," The Boston Globe. August 26, 2013.
- McQuaid, Cate. "Cartoony geometrics, 3D 'paintings' standout at the deCordova Biennial," The Boston Globe. October 12, 2013.
- Moeller, Robert. "Made in New England: The 2013 deCordova Biennial. Hyperallergic. December 12, 2013
- Pyper, John. "The artists of the deCordova Biennial," Big Red & Shiny. October 30, 2013.
- Rysz, Tori. "Turning Barriers into Bridges." ArtNewEngland. July–Aug. 2016.
- Volmer, Suzanne. "2013 DeCordova Biennial, DeCordova Sculpture Park and Museum." Sculpture 33.7 (2014):72. Print. Photo.
