= Patrice Ordas =

French novelist (1951–2019)

- Born: 22 July 1951; France
- Died: 9 December 2019 (aged 68)
- Occupations: Writer; Author

Patrice Ordas (22 July 1951 – 9 December 2019) was a French novelist and comic writer.

== Biography ==
Ordas taught drawing, art history, and French at the Haute École de Joaillerie before he became headmaster. He became president of the group Meilleurs Ouvriers de France, artistic crafts adviser for numerous Ministers of Culture, and author of diplomas for French national education. During this time, he wrote the novels Les Griffes de l’Hermine and Les Moissons du Nouveau Monde. When he moved to Brittany, he met Patrick Cothias, with whom he co-wrote several novels.

Patrice Ordas died on 9 November 2019.

== Works ==
- Les Griffes de l'Hermine (1986)
- Les Moissons du Nouveau Monde (1987)
- Les Signes du Destin (1990)
- Quand on s'appelle Judas... (1991)
- Monsieur Némo et l'Éternité (2006)
- Les Eaux de Mortelune (2010)
- L'Ambulance 13 (2010)
- Traffic (2011)
- Hindenburg, les cendres du ciel : l'incendie qui éclaira l'Amérique (2011)
- L'Œil des Dobermans (2011-2016)
- Le Fils de l'officier (2011-2014)
- Nous, Anastasia R. : elle était coupable d'être la fille du tsar (2011)
- Nous, Anastasia R. (2012-2014)
- RMS Lusitania : l'Amérique ne pardonnera pas (2012)
- La rafale (2012-2014)
- Hindenburg (2013-2015)
- S.O.S.Lusitania (2013-2015)
- La Vénitienne (2014-2015)
- Moses Rose (2015-2017)
- Les naufragés du métropolitain (2015-2016)
- La nuit de l'Empereur (2015-2017)
