= Frank Santoro =

American cartoonist, painter and comics critic (born 1972)

- Born: 1972 (age 53–54); Pittsburgh, Pennsylvania, U.S.
- Occupations: Cartoonist, painter, writer
- Notable work: Storeyville, Pompeii, Pittsburgh

Frank Santoro (born 1972) is an American cartoonist, painter, and comics critic. He is best known for his graphic novels Storeyville (1995), Pompeii (2013), and Pittsburgh (2019), as well as for his contributions to comics criticism and education.

== Early life and education ==
Santoro was born in Pittsburgh, Pennsylvania, in 1972. He studied painting and drawing before turning to comics in the late 1980s. He has described his upbringing in Pittsburgh as a major influence on his later autobiographical work Pittsburgh.

== Career ==
Santoro's first major work was Storeyville (1995), originally published in tabloid format and later reissued in hardcover. His historical graphic novel Pompeii was published by PictureBox in 2013 to critical acclaim. In 2019, New York Review Comics released Pittsburgh, a memoir exploring family, memory, and the city's industrial landscape.

His comics have appeared in anthologies such as Kramers Ergot, Mome, and The Ganzfeld. Santoro has exhibited work at the American Academy of Arts and Letters in New York, the Carnegie Museum of Art in Pittsburgh, and the National Archaeological Museum of Naples.

== Criticism and teaching ==
Santoro co-founded the comics criticism magazine ComicsComics and has been a regular columnist for The Comics Journal. In 2011 he launched the Santoro Correspondence Course for Comic Book Makers, an educational program for aspiring cartoonists.
