= Trinidad Escobar =

American poet

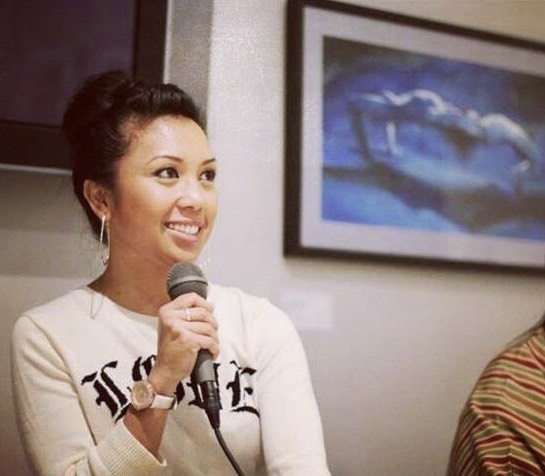
- Born: July 1986 (age 39); Bataan, Philippines
- Education: San Francisco University
- Occupations: Author, Poet, Cartoonist

Trinidad Escobar is an author, poet, and cartoonist active in the San Francisco Bay Area, and an educator at the California College of the Arts.

Her work has been published in The Nib, The Brooklyn Review, Walang Hiya, and Mythium. Her graphic memoir Crushed was self-published in 2018. Her graphic novel Of Sea and Venom was acquired in 2018 by Farrar, Straus and Giroux, a division of MacMillan Publishers. Escobar is represented by Trident Media Group based in New York City, New York.

== Early and personal life ==
Escobar was born in Bataan, Philippines during Super Typhoon Gading in July 1986. She is of Visayan descent and was adopted by a Filipino-American family in Milpitas, California in the United States of America. She created portraits from the age of four, and kept a written journal from age six. She also has 16 years of training in classical piano. Escobar cites an early interest in witchcraft, horror films, mythology, astrophysics, and veganism.

She is queer, a strong theme in her written work, and associates herself with the queer community and intersectional politics. She also pursued careers in grassroots and nonprofit work. Although Escobar does not identify as an anarchist, she cites anarchist theory and philosophy as the framework for her political beliefs.

She has a son named Kalayo Escobar, an aspiring young cartoonist and author.

== Education and artistic influences ==
Creators who influence Escobar's style include Octavia Butler, James Baldwin, Audre Lorde, Langston Hughes, Stephen King, Lynda Barry, Gary Larson, and Aaron McGruder.

Escobar attended San Francisco State University to study creative writing, and became a creative writing graduate student at Naropa University. She was a grad student again at California College of the Arts for an MFA in Comics, with director Matt Silady. Mentors Thi Bui and John Jennings edited her first book Crushed which was her graduate thesis.

== Body of work ==
As an adult, Escobar reunited with her birth family in the Philippines, which enabled her to connect with her family history and local mythology. This inspired her to create her graphic novel Crushed.

Escobar is a poet, cartoonist, illustrator and muralist. Her work has appeared in the San Jose Art Museum, the Cartoon Art Museum, the San Francisco Museum of Modern Art, and University of California system, and LitQuake. She also he exhibited at the Bay Area Book Festival. She worked with the Kearny Street Workshop and Intersection for the Arts.

Most of her comics are based on her personal experiences, such as "A Geography Of My Own" that was published in the Pinxy Radical Imagination Reader.

She is the co-founder of artist collectives Orpheus Forge, and 3 Realms, a mural collective project in Oakland, California, where The East Bay Meditation Center features their video mural and 2D mural. The Milpitas Library, which features in some of Escobar's work, exhibits her Filipino-American memorial mural in the teen book section.

She taught several classes at California College of the Arts.

== Process and philosophy ==
Escobar draws parallels between nature and people's identities. Her work features themes of natural brutality and regeneration. personal identity, her identity as a transnational adoptee, and her Filipino heritage.

Her vision is to diversify as well as decolonize comics and to continue indigenous talk story in a new medium.
