= Jungil Hong =

American artist (born 1976)

- Born: 1976 (age 49–50)
- Education: Rhode Island School of Design
- Awards: RISCA Fellowship Merit Award

Jungil Hong, also known as Jung-li Hong (born 1976), is an American artist based in Providence, Rhode Island. She is best known for her psychedelic, cartoon-inspired silkscreen poster art and paintings. More recently she has expanded into textiles.

== Early life and education ==
Hong moved to Providence, Rhode Island in 1995 in order to attend Rhode Island School of Design (RISD) and that same year taking up residency Fort Thunder. Hong, with Lightning Bolt drummer/vocalist Brian Chippendale, and musician and artist Mat Brinkman worked on pioneering an art movement between the mid 1990s to early 2000s in Providence, sometimes referred to as the "Providence/RISD" scene.

Hong received her B.F.A. degree in 1999 in ceramics and her M.F.A. degree in 2015 in textiles from Rhode Island School of Design (RISD).

== Work ==
She has won scholarships to the Penland School of Arts and Crafts, Haystack Mountain School of Crafts, and Watershed Center for Ceramic Arts. She has won the 2006 Rhode Island State Council of the Arts (RISCA) Fellowship Merit Awards in the Drawing and Printmaking and Crafts categories. She was selected for the 2007 deCordova Annual award, from deCordova Museum and Sculpture Park.

Her work has been shown at Gallery Agniel in Providence, MASS MoCA, the New Image Art Gallery in West Hollywood, Space 1026 in Philadelphia, The Museum of the Rhode Island School of Design, International Print Center New York (IPCNY), Florsitree Space in Baltimore, A.I.R. Gallery in New York, Cinders Gallery in New York, The Rhode Island Foundation Gallery, Limner Gallery in New York, Las Sucias Studio in Brooklyn, and the Cheongju Craft Museum in Cheongju, Korea.

Hong currently shares a large industrial studio space in Providence with her husband, Brian Chippendale, that they call the "Hilarious Attic". Together the couple has a son.
