= Art book fair =

An art book fair is a type of curated art fair or exhibition for the purpose of displaying and selling artists' books, exhibition catalogues, artist monographs, art periodicals, zines, and ephemera; as well as providing networking opportunities for artists, art book creators, illustrators, writers, specialty printers, independent publishers and their audience. Like other art fairs, an art book fair will not only include works for sale but also artist installations, projects, happenings, workshops, talks, panel discussions or book launches. Recursive fairs may run with a yearly theme or prompt which guides programming.

Unlike a traditional trade fair or book fair (such as the Frankfurt Book Fair), art book fairs are public and less formal in regards to industry conferencing or networking; while they do serve as an opportunity for publishers and artists to commingle, the nature of art book sales is such that there are no sales or rights marketing as with a regular book fair. Instead, art book fairs are an aspect of artist-run culture and an address to artmaking in the neoliberal era. Art book fairs are also a way for viewers to interact with, collaborate, and learn with and obtain artwork outside of commercial art institutions. Given the ephemeral and mass-produced nature of publishing history, "publishing seems to offer," as Offprint Paris director Yannick Bouillis put it, "an authentic, autonomous space within the art community. Books and other publishing artifacts such as magazines, posters, and tapes are—in comparison to artworks—relatively free from public and market concerns."

== History ==
The art book fair model differed from trade book fairs and art fairs, growing from the artist-run non-profit organization Printed Matter (est.1976). Printed Matter began a bookstore and gallery which celebrated publishing as an artistic medium, artist-run culture, and alternative art practice, an ethos which has carried through to contemporary art book events. In 2006 Printed Matter and then-director, artist AA Bronson, launched the first New York Art Book Fair, and later the LA Art Book Fair in 2013. These fairs have grown steadily to an audience well beyond the local art scenes or literati: the 2015 NY Art Book Fair was host to 370 exhibitors from 28 countries and had an estimated 35,000 guests in attendance.

As with the Printed Matter model, art book fairs have emerged around the world as a way for artist-run or non-profit institutions to generate awareness with a broader public and fundraise through the sale of admission, special event tickets, and limited edition artwork. Other fairs include the Vancouver Art Book Fair, Canada's first international art book fair, the London Art Book Fair and Tokyo Art Book Fair.
