= List of museums in Yukon =

This list of museums in Yukon, Canada contains museums which are defined for this context as institutions (including nonprofit organizations, government entities, and private businesses) that collect and care for objects of cultural, artistic, scientific, or historical interest and make their collections or related exhibits available for public viewing. Also included are non-profit art galleries and university art galleries. Museums that exist only in cyberspace (i.e., virtual museums) are not included.

Name	Image	Town/City	Region	Type	Summary
Big Jonathan House		Pelly Crossing		First Nations	information
Binet House Interpretive Centre		Mayo		Multiple	website, information, area history, early medical instruments, wildlife, geology and local permafrost studies
Campbell Region Interpretive Centre		Faro		Multiple	website, history, geology and wildlife
Caribou Crossing Trading Post		Carcross		Natural history	website, store with wildlife diorama museum
Dänojà Zho Cultural Centre		Dawson City		First Nations	information
Dawson City Historical Complex		Dawson City		History	website, includes pioneer Robert Service Cabin, costumed tours of town's historic buildings and gold rush history
Dawson City Museum		Dawson City		History	website, local history, including geology, pre-history, First Nations, early exploration, the gold rush, gold mining and the birth and development of Dawson City
George Johnston Museum		Teslin		First Nations	website, early 20th century photos of Tlingit culture, ceremonial artifacts, tools, local history
Jack London Interpretive Centre		Dawson City		Biographical	information, memorabilia and replica of author Jack London's cabin
Keno City Mining Museum		Keno City		Mining	website, gold and silver mining
Klondike Institute of Art And Culture		Dawson City		Art	website
Kluane Museum of Natural History		Burwash Landing		Natural history	information, animals, plants, birds, First Nations artifacts
Kwanlin Dün Cultural Centre		Whitehorse	Art and culture		
MacBride Copperbelt Mining Museum		Whitehorse		Railway	Historic railway and copper mining
MacBride Museum of Yukon History		Whitehorse		History	website, Yukon history and culture
Northern Lights Centre		Watson Lake		Science	website, science and folklore of the aurora borealis
Old Log Church Museum		Whitehorse		History	information, history and culture of area missionaries, whalers, explorers and Yukon First Nations
S.S. Klondike National Historic Site		Whitehorse		Maritime	Sternwheeler museum ship
Tagé Cho Hudän Interpretive Centre		Carmacks		First Nations	information
Teslin Tlingit Heritage Centre		Teslin		First Nations	information
Yukon Arts Centre		Whitehorse		Art	Includes an exhibit gallery
Yukon Beringia Interpretive Centre		Whitehorse		Natural history	Fossils, area pre-history, plants and animals
Yukon Transportation Museum		Whitehorse		Transportation	website, impact of different transportation methods on Yukon's history, development, industry and culture
