= Southern Tutchone language =

Athabaskan language

Southern Tutchone
- Dän kʼè
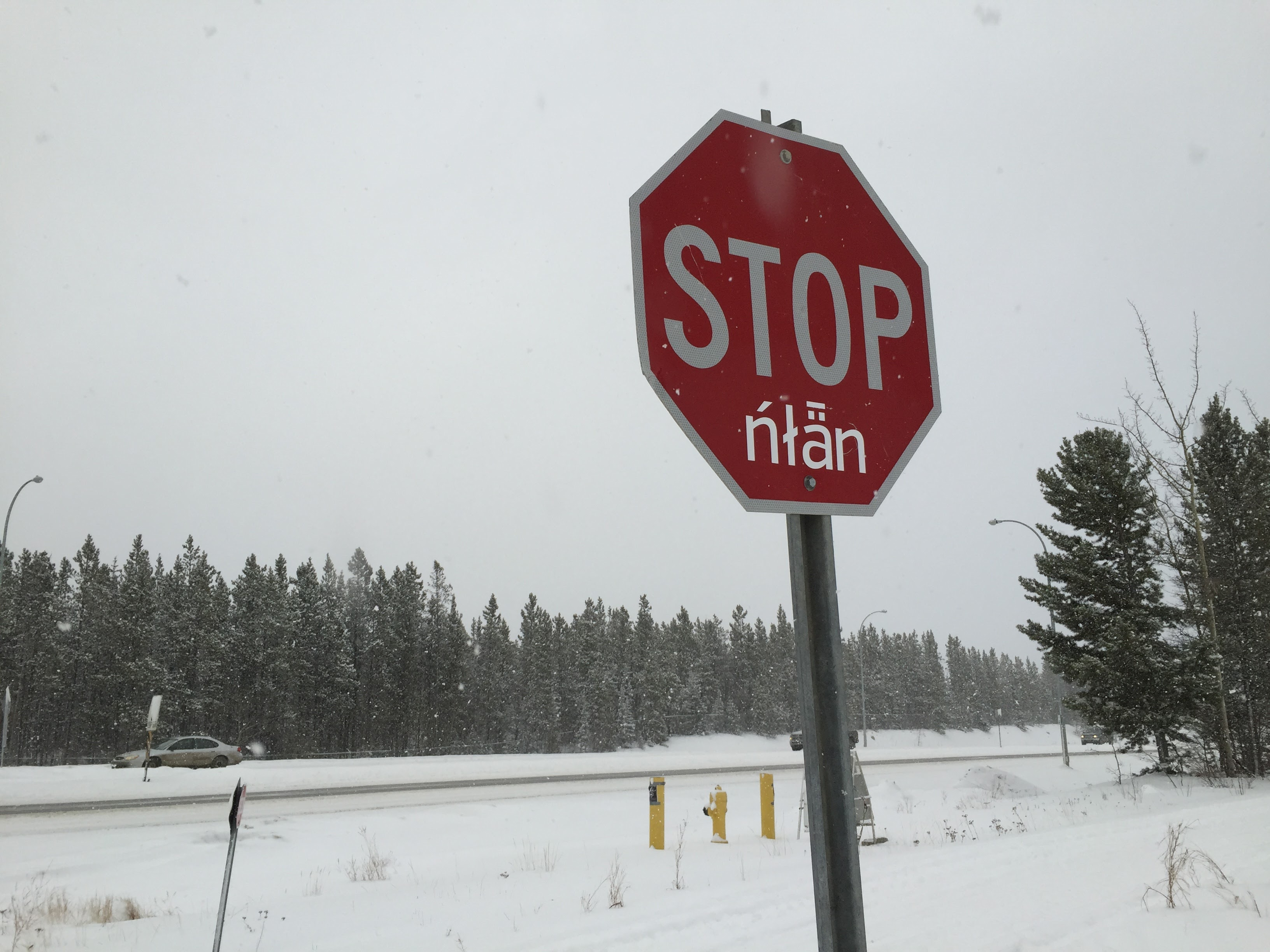
- Stop sign altered to include Southern Tutchone text as part of a revitalization effort
- Native to: Canada
- Region: Yukon
- Ethnicity: Southern Tutchone people
- Native speakers: (200 cited 1995)
- Language family: Na-Dené: Athabaskan–Eyak; Athabaskan; Northern Athabaskan; Southern Tutchone

Language codes
- ISO 639-3: tce
- Glottolog: sout2957
- ELP: Dän kʼè (Southern Tutchone)
- Map of Tutchone languages

- Southern Tutchone is classified as Critically Endangered by the UNESCO Atlas of the World's Languages in Danger.

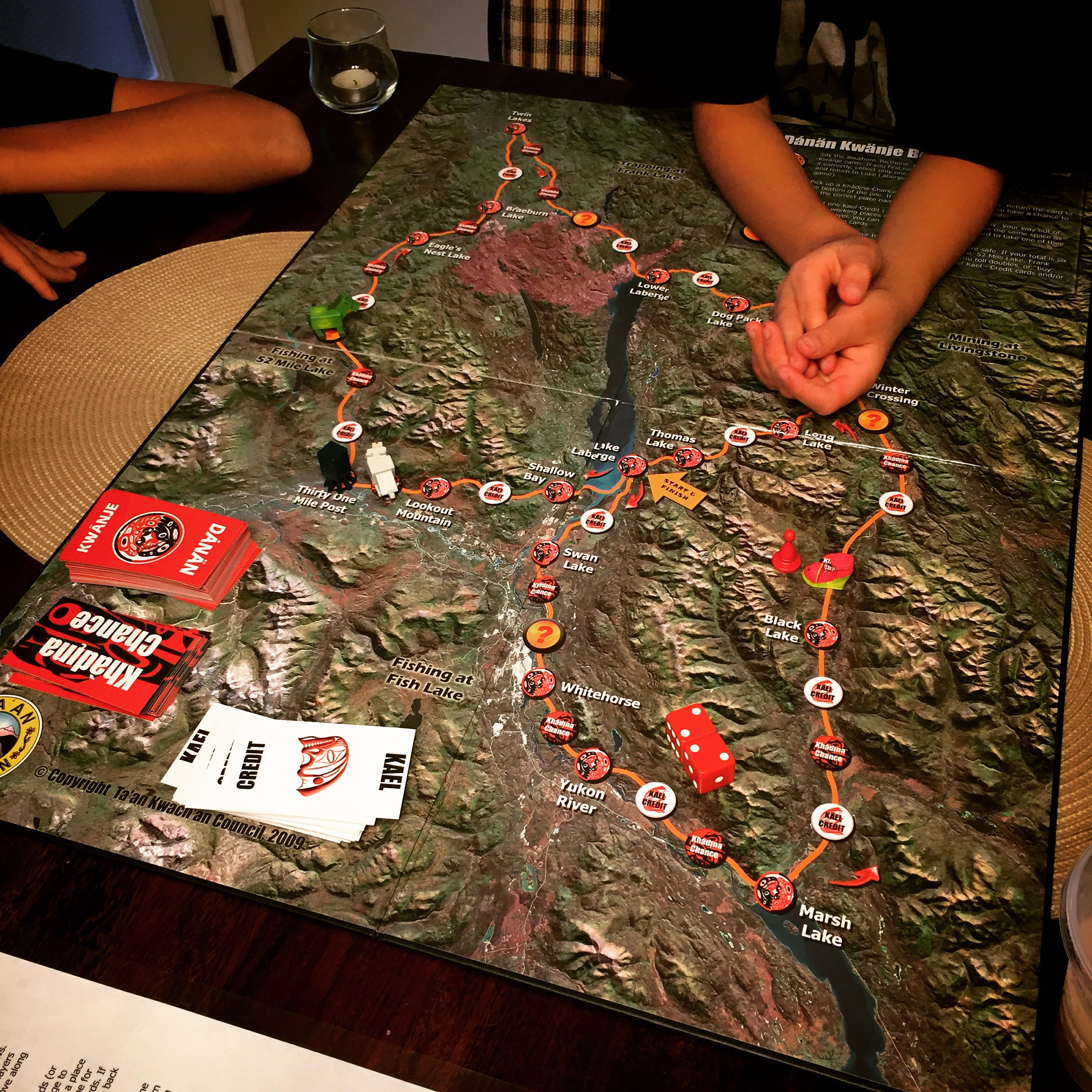
Board game in Southern Tutchone

Southern Tutchone is an Athabaskan language spoken by the Southern Tutchone in the Yukon communities of Aishihik, Burwash Landing, Champagne, Haines Junction, Kloo Lake, Klukshu, Lake Laberge, and Whitehorse. Although they are sometimes considered separate languages, Northern and Southern Tutchone speakers are generally able to understand each other in conversation, albeit with moderate difficulty.

The Southern Tutchone language is threatened.

== Dialects ==
- Aisihilik dialect
- Tàaʼan dialect
- Klukshu dialect
- Kluane dialect

== Revitalization efforts ==
Southern Tutchone is considered to be an endangered language, as its speaker population is shifting rapidly to English. In a 2011 census, Southern Tutchone was recorded as having 140 speakers.

=== Literacy and documentation ===
The Yukon Native Language Center (YNLC) describes information in regards to Southern Tutchone documentation and literacy, starting from the 1970s such as stories and songs, as well as a basic noun dictionary and language lessons. After 1984, there have been additional literacy workshops. One example is the Southern Tutchone textbook and audio, made by Margaret Workman, a native Southern Tutchone speaker. This information, along with other multimedia Southern Tutchone language learning and documentation resources, is currently available through the YNLC. In addition, in 1994 the Ta'an Kwach'an Council took part in an oral history and language preservation project, in which traditions, genealogy, and more information was documented.

=== Education ===
Tutchone language classes have been taught in Yukon schools since the early 1980s. Southern Tutchone language classes are included in the curriculum for students grades K–12 in schools at Kluane Lake, and three elementary schools in Whitehorse have language programs for Southern Tutchone. The St. Elias Community School in Haines Junction also offers Southern Tutchone language classes to students from K–12: one teacher handles K–4, another grades 5–12. In addition, the Yukon Native Language Center provides support for schools in regards to language learning, such the "Dakeyi – Our Country" program which is focused on high school students. In 2009, kindergarten classes in Haines Junction began learning Southern Tuchone in a bi-cultural program.

=== Community engagement ===
There have been ongoing community collaborations across the Yukon in regards to Southern Tutchone, with varied camps, workshops, and programs. For example, in 1995 and 1996, the Kluane First Nations participated in the sessions of "Working Together to Pass it on", a workshop meant to promote language activities and usage at home and the community. In addition, the Southern Tutchone Tribal Council held its first language conference "Kakwaddhin – Marking the Trail" in 1996, in order to review language programs and draft long and short-term strategic plans. This led to successful programs, including the "Following your Grandfather trail" camp in Klukshu in 1997. Nowadays there are varied programs offered in the Yukon to continue the language revitalization efforts, such as the Southern Tutchone Language Immersion program for adults. In 2018, The Champagne and Aishihik First Nation began a two-year Southern Tutchone immersion program, for adults with prior knowledge to the language. The program is under development and is the first of its kind in the Yukon Territory.

== Phonology ==
=== Consonants ===
Consonants
		Labial	Inter- dental	Alveolar			Post- alveolar	Retro- flex	Velar		Glottal
		Labial	Inter- dental	plain	sibilant	lateral	Post- alveolar	Retro- flex	plain	labial	Glottal
Nasal		m ⟨m⟩		n ⟨n⟩							
Plosive/ Affricate	plain		tθ ⟨ddh⟩	t ⟨d⟩	ts ⟨dz⟩	tɬ ⟨dl⟩	tʃ ⟨j⟩		k ⟨g⟩	kʷ ⟨gw⟩	ʔ ⟨ʼ⟩
Plosive/ Affricate	aspirated		tθʰ ⟨tth⟩	tʰ ⟨t⟩	tsʰ ⟨ts⟩	tɬʰ ⟨tl⟩	tʃʰ ⟨ch⟩		kʰ ⟨k⟩	kʷʰ ⟨kw⟩	
Plosive/ Affricate	ejective		tθʼ ⟨tth’⟩	tʼ ⟨t’⟩	tsʼ ⟨ts’⟩	tɬʼ ⟨tl’⟩	tʃʼ ⟨ch’⟩		kʼ ⟨k’⟩	kʷʼ ⟨kw’⟩	
Plosive/ Affricate	prenasalized	ᵐb ⟨mb⟩		ⁿd ⟨nd⟩			ⁿdʒ ⟨nj⟩				
Fricative	voiceless		θ ⟨th⟩		s ⟨s⟩	ɬ ⟨ł⟩	ʃ ⟨sh⟩		x ⟨kh⟩	xʷ ⟨khw⟩	h ⟨h⟩
Fricative	voiced		ð ⟨dh⟩		z ⟨z⟩	ɮ ⟨l⟩	ʒ ⟨zh⟩		ɣ ⟨gh⟩	ɣʷ ⟨ghw⟩	
Approximant							j ⟨y⟩	ɻ ⟨r⟩		w ⟨w⟩	

=== Vowels ===
	Front	Central	Back
High	i ⟨i⟩	ɨ ⟨ü⟩	u ⟨u⟩
Mid	e ⟨e⟩	ə ⟨ä⟩	o ⟨o⟩
Low	a ⟨a⟩		

Vowels are differentiated for nasalization and high, mid, and low tone.

- Nasalized: į, ų, ų̈, ę, ą̈, ǫ, ą
- High tone: í, ú, ǘ, é, ä́, ó, á
- Mid tone: ī, ū, ǖ, ē, ǟ, ō, ā

== In popular culture ==
Since 2011 the Adäka Cultural Festival, an annual multi-disciplinary arts and culture festival, has been held in Whitehorse. Celebrating First Nations arts and culture, with a specific focus on Yukon First Nations, Adäka, in the Southern Tutchone language, means 'coming into the light'.

In 2019, Cole Pauls published the science-fiction comic-book Dakwäkãda Warriors, which contains one hundred and ten Southern Tutchone words and phrases, accounting for about one quarter of the lexemes in the book.
