= Sequential (magazine) =

Comic book industry web-magazine

- Website type: Comic book
- Available in: English
- Owner: Max Douglas
- Editor: Max Douglas
- Website: sequentialpulp.ca
- Registration: Yes
- Launched: 2002; 24 years ago

Sequential is an English-language web-magazine which publishes news, interviews, and reviews about Canadian comics, with a focus on the small press scene. It was founded by cartoonist Max Douglas in 2002. In 2019 the site transitioned to a full-colour print magazine under the editorship of Brendan Montgomery. To date, 17 issues of the magazine have seen print.

== History ==
=== Blog ===
In 2002, the Montreal-based Douglas began publishing what was essentially a linklog about local goings on in his scene. It began as an outgrowth of the news page of the Montreal Comics Jam website, but with a handful of volunteer contributing writers and artists, the blog, with the full title Sequential: Canadian Comix News & Culture, quickly established itself as a well-known hub for cartoonists, comic creators, publishers, and comics readers, posting news about book releases and events. Over the years, the blog has served a secondary function of documenting and preserving Canadian comics history, ensuring that Canada's distinct cartooning legacy, from the 19th century through the launch of the "Canadian Whites" during WW II, to today, is actively studied and preserved. Through columns like the "C-List" and other specialized features, Sequential bridges past movements with modern Indie comics developments, preventing Canadian pop-culture history from being overshadowed by larger national comics markets. The site has historically put an emphasis on amplifying independent and underrepresented voices, dedicating its platform almost exclusively to independent comic book creators, with the stated goal of giving visibility to localized and marginalized narratives, routinely spotlighting Indigenous comics and alternative regional creators who exist outside of mainstream publishing. In this sense, Sequential acts as a central bulletin board for the Canadian cartooning industry. It provides tangible structural support to the community by centralizing:

- Crowdfunding Support: Highlighting local initiatives via dedicated spotlights (like Kickstarter) to help artists successfully fund their graphic projects.
- Festival and Event Coverage: Directing creators and fans toward regional events, including the Toronto Comic Arts Festival, Festival BD de Montréal, Vancouver Comic Arts Festival (VANCAF), and the Prairie Comics Festival.
- Award Visibility: Tracking and promoting national honours like the Sequential Magazine Awards, Bédélys Awards, and the Doug Wright Awards
- Community: through its digital and print iterations, Sequential aims to give emerging cartoonists critical validation and professional exposure early in their careers.

=== Sequential Pulp: The Early Print Version ===
Beginning in 2009, Sequential published a free black-and-white zine to coincide with the annual Toronto Comic Arts Festival. Edited and designed by Douglas, issues were published for 2009, 2010, and 2011.

The first issue contained articles by Jamie Coville, Robin Fisher, Brad Mackay, Bryan Munn, Jim Munroe, and Robert Pincombe, with comics by Willow Dawson, John Martz, Mahendra Singh, Fiona Smyth, Sean Ward, and Dan Zabbal.

=== Sequential Magazine ===
In 2019 Sequential relaunched as a print magazine edited by Brendan Montgomery, with the website used mostly to promote new issues of the physical version. Rebranded "Sequential: Canadian Independent Comic Book Magazine," the new full-colour version was an outgrowth of Montgomery's Canadian Independent Comic Book Wiki project and website. In introducing the new magazine, Montgomery announced his stated goal: "to expand the efforts of both Sequential and the Wiki to promote self-published and indie comic books made by Canadians. We hope to provide a new avenue for readers to connect to these creators through in-depth interviews and to discover new books through reviews and previews."

The magazine provided long-form interviews with cover-featured creators, and published several special-focus issues, including an issue dedicated to Black creators, a special feature on First Nations comics, and an issue dedicated to the 80th anniversary of the Canadian Whites.

The magazine added its own annual awards in 2019 with online voting from readers in seven categories Best Comic Book, Best Graphic Novel, Best Webcomic, Favourite Writer, Favourite Artist, Favourite Cartoonist, and Favourite Podcast. Montgomery has stated the reasoning for starting the Awards, stating "I thought a fan-voted awards which is something we didn't have in Canada for Canadian comics --there's other juried awards, The Joe Shuster Awards and The Doug Wright Awards-- but if those are the Oscars and what have you, then we needed a People's Choice."

After 17 issues, Montgomery announced he was giving up his role as editor and publisher of the magazine as of January 2025. The editor reigns were reportedly handed to Christian Muise. Since that time no new issues have been published and the website has remained largely inactive.
