= MacBride Museum of Yukon History =

Canadian museum

Coordinates: 60°43′16″N 135°03′06″W

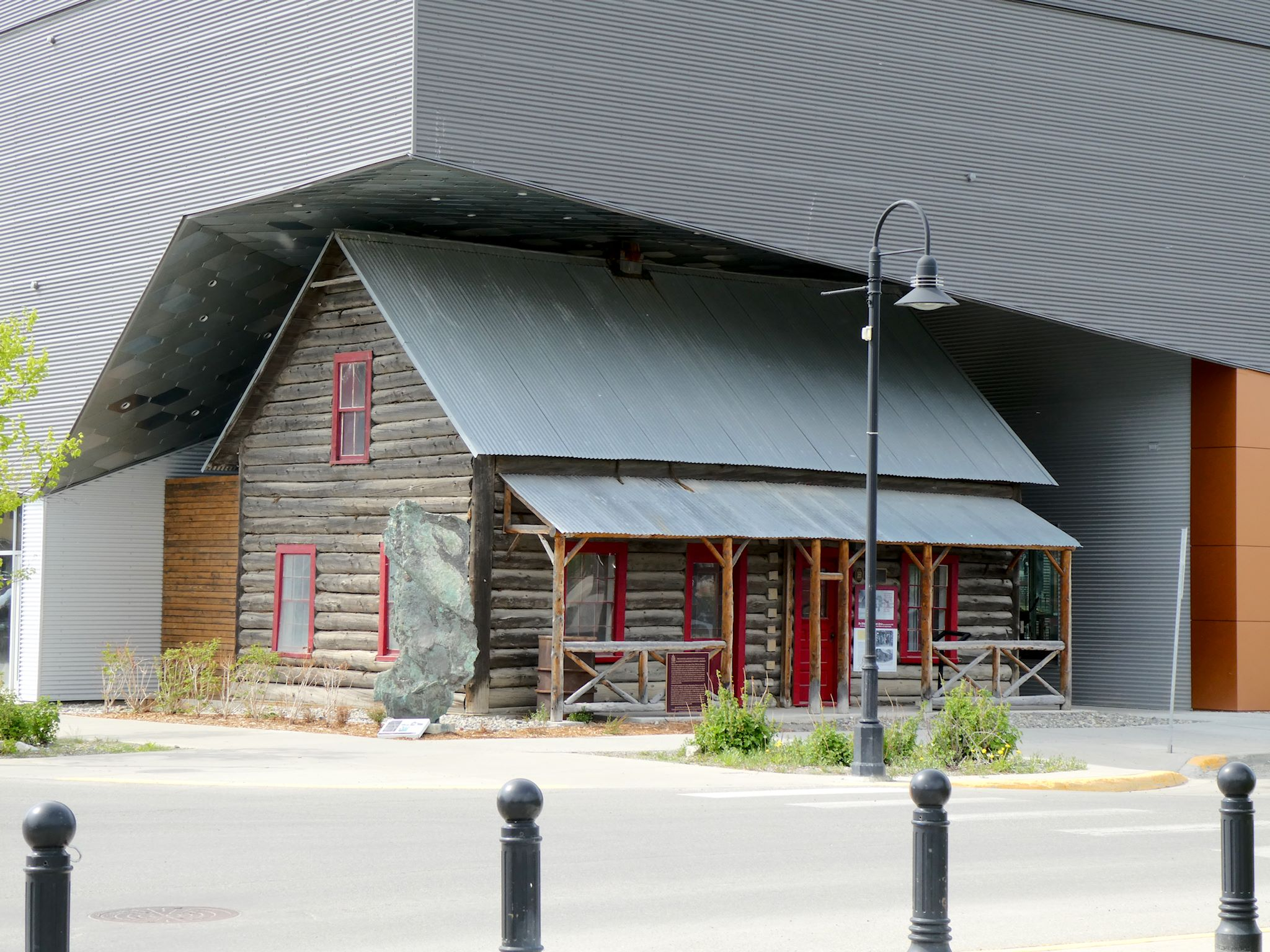

The MacBride Museum of Yukon History is a non profit museum located in Whitehorse, Yukon, Canada. Founded in 1950 by the Yukon Historical Society, and opened in 1952, it is the oldest museum in the Yukon. Funding to expand the museum was approved in 2016 by the Department of Canadian Heritage and Government of Yukon, with the co-operation of the City of Whitehorse. The museum consists of three sites: the MacBride Museum, MacBride Roundhouse, and the MacBride Copperbelt Mining Museum.

== See also ==
- Jim Robb (painter)
- Kwanlin Dün Cultural Centre
- Yukon Arts Centre
