= Dakwäkãda Warriors =

Graphic novel by Cole Pauls

- Date: 2019
- Page count: 112 pages
- Publisher: Conundrum Press

Creative team
- Creator: Cole Pauls
- ISBN: 9781772620412

Dakwäkãda Warriors is a 2019 Indigenous-futurist comic book by Cole Pauls. The book offers a schlocky science-fiction story told in a mixture of English and the Aishihik (Äshèy k'e) dialect of Southern Tutchone. The story allegorises the colonial violence of Europeans in North America.

== Summary ==
The heroes of the book are the Southern-Tutchone protectors of Earth, the Power Ranger-like Ägay and Ts'urk'i (whose names mean "wolf" and "crow", evoking the clan-names of the Southern Tutchone people). They fly spaceships shaped like the heads of their namesake animals. Their antagonists are Space Kwädą̄y Dän (whose name means "the Space Long Ago People") and Cyber Nàa'į (whose name means "The Cyber Bushman"); the villains' spaceships are, respectively, shaped like a river-dredger used to mine gold in the Yukon and a hairy Bigfoot foot.

In the first book, the heroes encounter their foes while on a routine patrol of outer space, and discover that Space Kwädą̄y Dän and Cyber Nàa'į are trying to manipulate the Sun in order to melt ice on one of the moons of Jupiter and so to free montrous mammoths frozen there. The villains plan to use the mammoths to attack Earth. The heroes successfully attack the villains and save the day.

In the second book, Cyber Nàa'į begins to have flashbacks to his former life. We learn that he was abducted from Earth by Space Kwädą̄y Dän, his memory wiped, and his body cybernetically augmented. He is then enslaved and forced to work as an accomplice to Space Kwädą̄y Dän. Meanwhile, the heroes finish making a spaceship for Ägay. While testing out the spaceship, they encounter Cyber Nàa'į, who recounts his story to them and reveals that Space Kwädą̄y Dän is planning to kidnap and assimilate more nàa'į. Cyber Nàa'į defects to the heroes and becomes a double-agent.

In the third book, the heroes call upon their Indigenous super-hero friends from across Canada to help them defeat Space Kwädą̄y Dän. By this time, however, their foe has reasserted control over Cyber Nàa'į, kidnapped and brainwashed four more nàa'į, and teamed them up to control a vast cyber-nàa'į-mecha-spaceship. At the last minute, Cyber Nàa'į turns on Space Kwädą̄y Dän and defeats him decisively. Earth is saved and the nàa'į are rehabilitated.

The book also includes an essay on its origins, entitled "Dän K'e Futurism: Creating Dakwäkãda Warriors"; a series of "pin-ups", art inspired by the book produced by other people: Blake Sháa'koon Lepine, Gord Hill, Whess Harman, and Teresa Vander Meer-Chasse; sketches from the production of the volume; and a glossary.

== Language ==
The book uses English as its matrix language, but for a significant proportion of the words it substitutes Southern Tuchone vocabulary. Southern Tuchone words are glossed both on the pages where they appear and in a glossary at the end of the book, which lists one hundred and ten words and phrases. Thus an English-speaking reader can develop some familiarity with Southern Tuchone while enjoying the story. Pauls had studied Southern Tuchone at school but took advice from two language-preservers, Vivian Smith and Khâsha.

The original publications used multiple dialects and spelling-systems. For the book-publication, Pauls normalised the language largely "to just be one dialect & for it to be the simplified Aishihik dialect that the Yukon Native Language Center teaches".

== Publication history ==
The book was originally self-published by Pauls as three separate comics in 2016–18, distributed to shops by Pauls himself.

== Reception ==
In the view of Shawn Gilmore, the book is "a radical comic, which is designed for young readers to help them learn Southern Tutchone, while at the same time offering a compelling allegory of colonial oppression and resistance via a riff on sci-fi stories like Voltron" and "a masterful first major work from this comics creator".

Broken Pencil opined that "Pauls spins a tale of Indigenous resistance that serves as both an introduction to understanding colonialism and a rock socking sci-fi western, all rendered in a style that boldly blends the best of contemporary punk comics with traditional motifs. [...] Miss this book, and you're missing history".

Summer Hayes argued that "at first glance, this could be easily dismissed as a wacky space adventure in which Wolf and Crow defend Earth from evil beings from space. In Pauls' clever hands, however, readers do get a rollicking action story, but one that's wrapped around the lasting impacts of colonization [...] Pauls' drawing style is refreshingly unpolished, recalling DIY zine culture, and it stands out in a world of overly slick superheroes. [...] Intentional without being didactic or overbearing, this is an excellent addition to the growing Indigenous futurism movement."

"Pauls's emphasis on building something 'new' out of something old is guided by a strong sense of ethical purpose, with meticulous attention paid to upholding the relationships that inform such a practice of assemblage. Rather than severing objects from their original contexts, Pauls suggests that bricolage can instead emphasize (re)connections".

Commentators also noted the book's use of Coast Salish artistic styles.

=== Awards ===
One of the comics that came to comprise the work won Broken Pencil magazine's Best Comic and Best Zine of the Year Award in 2017, and Dakwäkãda Warriors was shortlisted for the Doug Wright Award for best book for kids.
