= Toronto Comic Arts Festival =

Comic book festival in Toronto, Ontario

- Status: Active
- Genre: Alternative comics convention
- Frequency: Annual
- Venue: Mattamy Athletic Centre
- Locations: Toronto, Ontario
- Country: Canada
- Inaugurated: March 29, 2003; 23 years ago
- Founders: Peter Birkemoe; Chris Butcher
- Most recent: June 6–7, 2026
- Attendance: 28,000 (2024)
- Organizer: Toronto Comic Arts Festival
- Website: torontocomics.com

The Toronto Comic Arts Festival (TCAF) is a comic book festival held annually in Toronto, Ontario, Canada. Since its founding in 2003, TCAF has grown to become one of the world’s largest festivals dedicated to the promotion and appreciation of comic arts.

== Programming ==
TCAF focuses on alternative and independent comics, but includes other creative arts besides comics. Unlike traditional comic book conventions, TCAF is modeled off of independent comic festivals and art book fairs such as the Angoulême International Comics Festival and Small Press Expo.

TCAF is a free-admission event.

== History ==
TCAF was founded by Peter Birkemoe and Chris Butcher of The Beguiling in 2003. The festival was held biennially until 2009, when in partnership with the Toronto Public Library it became an annual event. The festival took place at the Toronto Reference Library until 2024. Starting in 2025 the festival was moved to Toronto Metropolitan University's Mattamy Athletic Centre.

=== Event history ===
Dates	Location	Attend.	Featured Guests
March 29, 2003	Trinity-St. Paul's United Church	600	
May 28–29, 2005	Honest Ed's parking lot	6,000	
August 18–19, 2007	Victoria College	6,000	Chester Brown, Darwyn Cooke, Evan Dorkin, James Jean, Joe Matt, Paul Pope, Seth
May 9–10, 2009	Toronto Reference Library	10,500	Ivan Brunetti, Anke Feuchtenberger, Emmanuel Guibert, Bryan Lee O’Malley, Paul Pope, Seth, Yoshihiro Tatsumi, Adrian Tomine
May 8–9, 2010	Toronto Reference Library	12,500	Daniel Clowes, Jeff Lemire, Paul Pope, Dash Shaw, James Sturm, Charles Vess, Jim Woodring
May 7–8, 2011	Toronto Reference Library	15,000	David Boswell, Chester Brown, Darwyn Cooke, Ludovic Debeurme, Brecht Evens, Usamaru Furuya, Lorenzo Mattotti, Mawil, Natsume Ono, John Porcellino, Jillian Tamaki, Adrian Tomine, Pendleton Ward, Chris Ware
May 5–6, 2012	Toronto Reference Library	18,000	Gabriella Giandelli, Aislin, Gabriel Bá, Kate Beaton, Alison Bechdel, Arne Bellstorf, José-Luis Bocquet, Guy Delisle, Tom Gauld, Matt Holm, Jennifer Holm, Jason, Konami Kanata, Kazu Kibuishi, Kid Koala, Bryan Lee O’Malley, Hugues Micol, Fábio Moon, Catel Muller, Michel Rabagliati, Andy Runton, Jeff Smith, Pendleton Ward, Adam Warren
May 8–9, 2013	Toronto Reference Library	18,000	Bill Amend, David B, Blutch, Boulet, Ivan Brunetti, C.F., Chihoi, Glyn Dillon, Lisa Hanawalt, Gilbert Hernandez, Jaime Hernandez, Chip Kidd, Michael Kupperman, Eric Lambé, Bryan Lee O’Malley, Ulli Lust, Taiyo Matsumoto, Rutu Modan, Françoise Mouly, Frederik Peeters, Paul Pope, Michel Rabagliati, Dash Shaw, Art Spiegelman, Gengoroh Tagame, Raina Telgemeier, Judith Vanistendael
May 10–11, 2014	Toronto Reference Library	22,000	Moyoco Anno, Isabelle Arsenault, Kate Beaton, Gabrielle Bell, Christophe Blain, Fanny Britt, Ed Brubaker, Darwyn Cooke, Michael DeForge, Renaud Dillies, est em, Pascal Girard, Réal Godbout, Akira Himekawa, Lynn Johnston, Kazu Kibuishi, Reinhard Kleist, Abel Lanzac, Luke Pearson, Sean Phillips, Mimi Pond, Trina Robbins, Jeff Smith, Jillian Tamaki Mariko Tamaki
May 9–10, 2015	Toronto Reference Library	24,000	Pénélope Bagieu, Lynda Barry, Marc Bell, Pascal Blanchet, Boulet, Charles Burns, Eleanor Davis, Étienne Davodeau, Julie Doucet, Hunt Emerson, Gurihiru, Simon Hanselmann, Dustin Harbin, Matt Holm, Jennifer Holm, Aya Kanno, Killoffer, Lucy Knisley, Ed Luce, Jason Lutes, Lorenzo Mattotti, Scott McCloud, Anders Nilsen, Seth, ND Stevenson, Barbara Stok, Gengoroh Tagame, Jillian Tamaki, Adrian Tomine, Chip Zdarsky
May 14–15, 2016	Toronto Reference Library	25,000	Marguerite Abouet, Adrian Alphona, Balak, Kate Beaton, Boulet, Chester Brown, Brian Chippendale, Brecht Evens, Duncan Fegredo, Manuele Fior, Matt Furie, Pia Guerra, Lisa Hanawalt, Simon Hanselmann, Jennifer Hayden, Faith Erin Hicks, Keith Jones, Shintaro Kago, Bendik Kaltenborn, Jeff Lemire, Emi Lenox, Francisco Sousa Lobo, MariNaomi, Sean Phillips, Michel Rabagliati, Rokudenashiko, Ant Sang, Steve Skroce, Raina Telgemeier, Noah Van Sciver, Brian K. Vaughan, Bastien Vivès, Gene Luen Yang, Barbara Yelin, Chip Zdarsky
May 13–14, 2017	Toronto Reference Library	25,000	Charlie Adlard, Isabelle Arsenault, Paolo Bacilieri, Pénélope Bagieu, Gabrielle Bell, Fanny Britt, Svetlana Chmakova, David Collier, Katherine Collins, Dave Cooper, Colleen Coover, Eleanor Davis, Aimée de Jongh, Joe Decie, Guy Delisle, Rick Geary, Élise Gravel, Anna Haigisch, Shannon Hale, Igor Hofbauer, Jesse Jacobs, Jason, Jeff Lemire, Marjorie Liu, Ulli Lust, Jane Mai, Dave McKean, An Nguyen, Michael Nybrandt, Bryan Lee O’Malley, Gary Panter, LeUyen Pham, Nate Powell, Michel Rabagliati, Sandrine Revel, Emma Ríos, Martina Schradi, Gengoroh Tagame, San Takeda, Jillian Tamaki, Marcelino Truong, Ngozi Ukazu, Scott Westerfeld, Eric Kostiuk Williams
May 12–13, 2018	Toronto Reference Library	25,000	Yvan Alagbé, Gus Allen, Ho Che Anderson, Inio Asano, David B, Romy Blümel, Vera Brosgol, Eddie Campbell, E. M. Carroll, Cecil Castellucci, Michael Comeau, Max de Radiguès, Michael DeForge, Brigitte Findakly, Gale Galligan, Melanie Gillman, Charise Mericle Harper, Jamie Hernandez, Ananth Hirsh, James Kochalka, Hope Larson, Hartley Lin, Liniers, Wauter Mannaert, Françoise Mouly, National Cartoonists Society, Audrey Niffenegger, Katie O'Neill, Lee Knox Ostertag, Yuko Ota, Danish Pavilion, Chris Reynolds, Julie Rocheleau, Sergio García Sánchez, Fiona Smyth, Jillian Tamaki, Mariko Tamaki, Lewis Trondheim, Jen Wang, Georgia Webber, Ronald Wimberly, Stephanie Wunderlich
May 11–12, 2019	Toronto Reference Library		Gabriel Bá, Bessora, Daria Bogdanska, E. M. Carroll, Alexandre Clérisse, Ezra Claytan Daniels, Margreet de Heer, Aimee de Jongh, Entreviñetas, Kieron Gillen, Bill Griffith, Stephanie Hans, Erica Henderson, Gord Hill, Junji Ito, Jason, JonJon, Lucy Knisley, Nora Krug, Ness Lee, Rachel Lindsay, Richard Marazano, Jamie McKelvie, Fábio Moon, Søren Glosimodt Mosdal, Anders Nilsen, Alex Norris, Ben Passmore, Emilie Plateau, Jérémie Royer, David Rubín, Brian Selznick, Seth, Vivek Shraya, Mark Alan Stamaty, James Stokoe, Hiromi Takashima, Craig Thompson, Typex, Jhonen Vasquez, Kelsey Wroten, Chip Zdarsky
May 9–10, 2020	–	–	Cancelled due to the COVID-19 pandemic
May 8–15, 2021	–	–	Held virtually. Virtual festival development by the Hand Eye Society.
June 17–19, 2022	Toronto Reference Library		Tillie Walden, Rumi Hara, Robyn Smith, Zviane, Emma Hunsinger, Jamila Rowser, Jenn Woodall, Anoosha Syed, Benjamin Marra, Terry Dodson, Akane Torikai, Johnnie Christmas, Jo Rioux, Lee Lai, Conor Stechschulte, Emily Hampshire, Katherine Battersby, Stanley Wany, S. Bear Bergman, Joe Ollmann, Aimée de Jongh, Sonja Ahlers, Saul Freedman-Lawson, Catherine Castro, Mikaël, Seth, Ho Che Anderson, John Patrick Green, Brandon Mitchell, Veronika Barinova, Hope Larson, Neil Gaiman, Maggie Edkins Willis, Ben Passmore, and Gord Hill.
April 29–30, 2023	Toronto Reference Library		
May 11–12, 2024	Toronto Reference Library	28,000	
June 7–8, 2025	Mattamy Athletic Centre		
