= Hand Eye Society =

Canadian video game arts organization

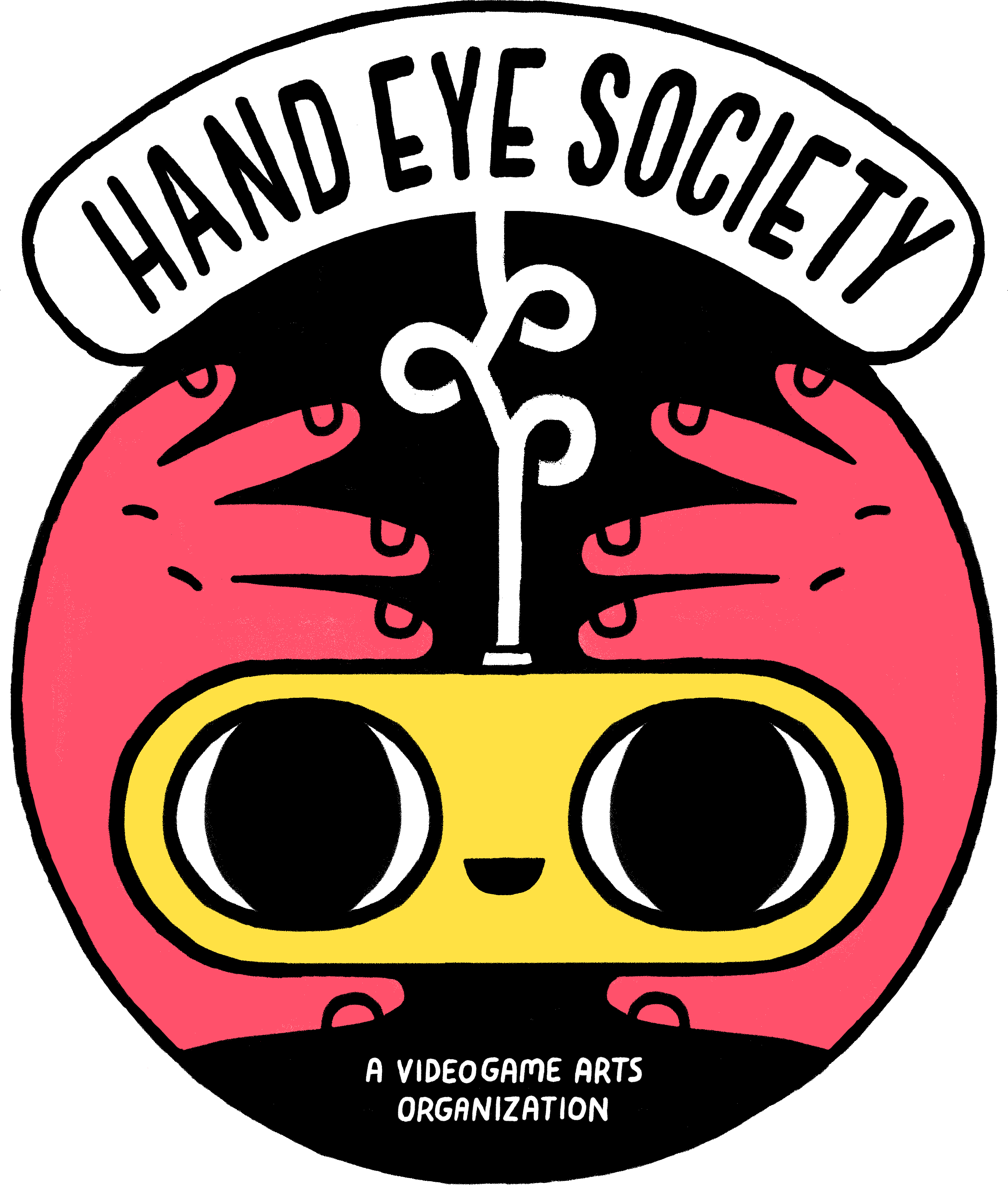
- Hand Eye Society logo
- Founded: 2009
- Company Type: Non-Profit
- Based in: Toronto, Ontario, Canada
- Website: handeyesociety.com

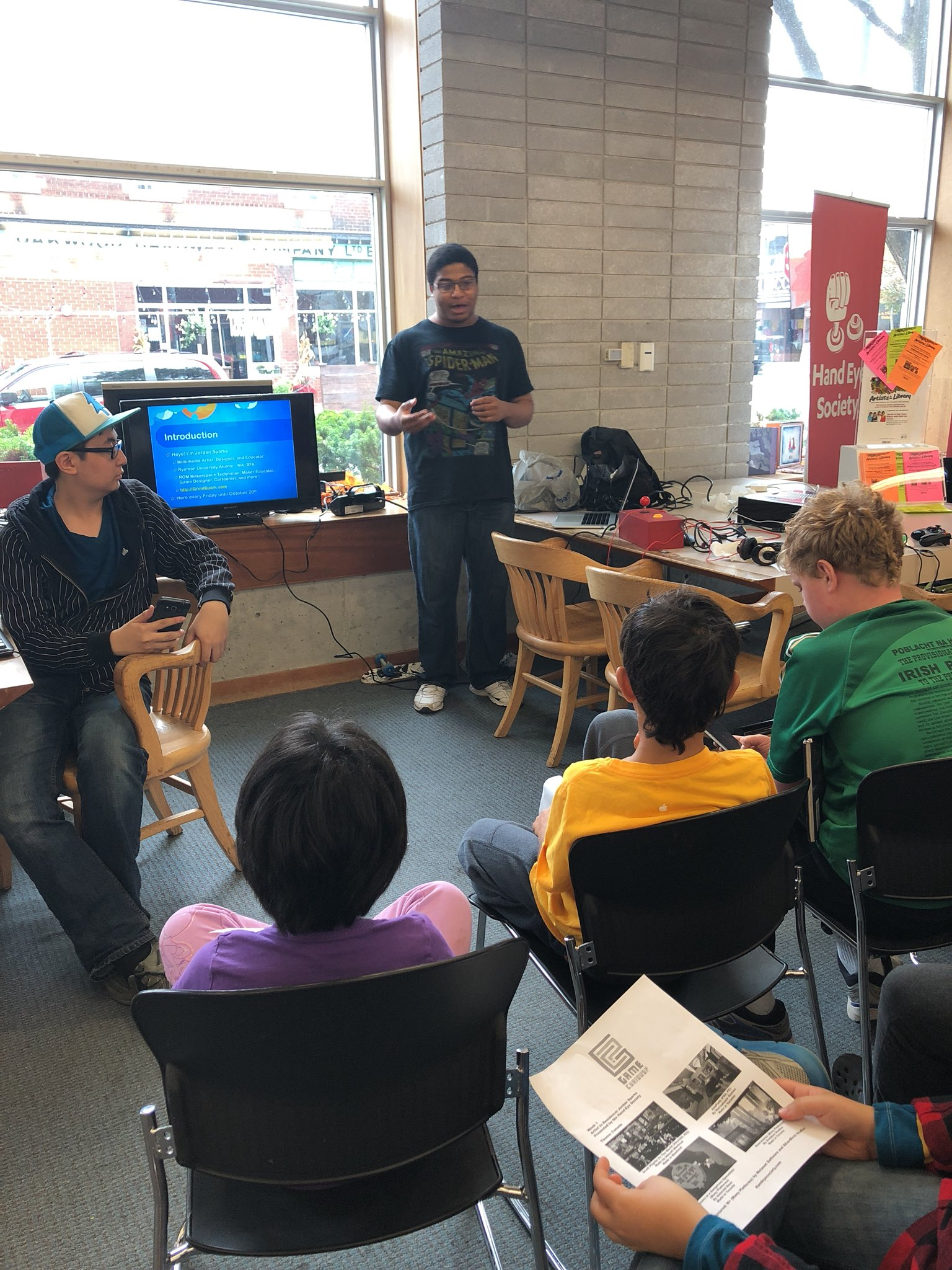
Game Curious 2017 at the Oakwood Library in Toronto.

The Hand Eye Society is Canada’s leading non-profit arts organization dedicated to the creative and cultural possibilities of games. Based in Toronto, Ontario and rooted in community, artistic experimentation, and inclusion, Hand Eye Society provides vital support and platforming for creators who confront the barriers of mainstream game creation.

== Mission ==
The Hand Eye Society’s mission is to support and showcase video games as creative expression—centering our work around artists and fostering inclusive communities through game arts.

Hand Eye Society envisions a world where game arts are recognized as a crucial cultural practice—accessible to all, rooted in equity, and driven by bold, imaginative creators.

Founded in 2009, the Hand Eye Society is one of the oldest videogame arts nonprofits in the world, and is based in Toronto, Ontario, Canada. It collaborates with studios, artists, and organizations around the world.

== History ==
Amidst a growing indie development scene in Toronto, The Hand Eye Society was founded in 2009 by Jim Munroe, Jim McGinley, Emilie McGinley, Mare Sheppard, Raigan Burns, Jessica Mak, Craig D. Adams, and Miguel Sternberg to form a sense of community and promote videogames as an artistic medium. With its help, by 2012, the Toronto independent game was thriving with critical and commercial successes being released from Capybara Games, Metanet, Superbrothers, Queasy Games, and many more.

Early activities focused on creating spaces for indie developers to showcase their work outside of commercial contexts as well as offering guided programming to increase participation in game making. This took the form of programs such as ‘The Difference Engine Initiative’ (DEI), inviting marginalized persons to use their skills and creativity to make their first games. Graduates of this program include Zoë Quinn, Kara Stone, Sagan Yee (who later took over leadership of the organization) and Rebecca Cohen-Palacios, who went on to establish Pixelles, a non-profit for marginalized game developers in Montreal.

Over time, Hand Eye Society expanded to run festivals, workshops, mentorship programs, and more. It pioneered techniques and technology to deliver hybrid and online programming, making the knowledge and creativity of its community accessible to global audiences, particularly through livestreamed talks and workshops launched during the COVID-19 pandemic. While committed to expanding its reach and impact, Hand Eye Society remains committed to growing the game arts scene in Toronto and beyond through community-focused, inclusive, and artist-led programming.

== Leadership & Governance ==
As a non-profit, Hand Eye Society is overseen by a volunteer Board of Directors, which meets monthly to guide the organization’s strategic direction and ensure its sustainability. The Board recruits new members regularly, with a focus on diversifying expertise and supporting community representation. All activities are overseen by an Executive Director. Past leaders have included Jim Munroe (2009 - 2015), Sagan Yee (2016 - 2020), Len Predko (2020 - 2022), Victoria Kucher (2024 - 2025), and Miriam Verburg (2025 - present).

== Staff ==
=== Current Staff ===
- Executive Director: Miriam Verburg
- Director of Operations: Felicia Daisy
- Communications Coordinator: Cassandra Matchett
- Torontron Technician: May Yu

=== Past Executive Directors ===
Jim Munroe, Sagan Yee, Len Predko, Victoria Kucher

=== Past Staff Members ===
Jim McGinley, Emilie McGinley, Craig D Adams, Miguel Sternberg, Raigan Burns, Mare Sheppard, Jessica Mak, Kenneth Cho, Amanda Wong, Aaron Demeter, David Fono, Adam Axbey, Kai Winter, Kadeem Dunn, Royel Edwards, Brendan Lehman, Emily Flynn-Jones, Paul Delair Desjardins, Jordan Sparks

== Board of Directors ==
=== Current Board Members ===
- Board Chair: Yifat Shaik
- Treasurer: Neilson Koerner-Safrata
- Nick Fox-Gieg
- Julien Balbontin
- Osioreame Ikiebe

=== Past Board Members ===
- Maxwell Neely-Cohen
- Em Lazer-Walker
- Emma Westecott
- Jim McGinley
- Craig D. Adams
- Jessica Mak
- Raigan Burns
- Mark Rabo
- Mare Sheppard
- Jim Munroe
- Alex Hayter
- Stephanie Fisher
- Daniele Hopkins
- Sagan Yee
- Emma Scratch
- Miguel Sternberg
- Alex Jansen
- Sarah Grimes
- Cindy Poremba
- Shaun Hatton
- Chris Gehman
- Adam Axbey
- Samantha Summers
- Miriam Verburg
- Ellen Reade

== Regular Initiatives ==
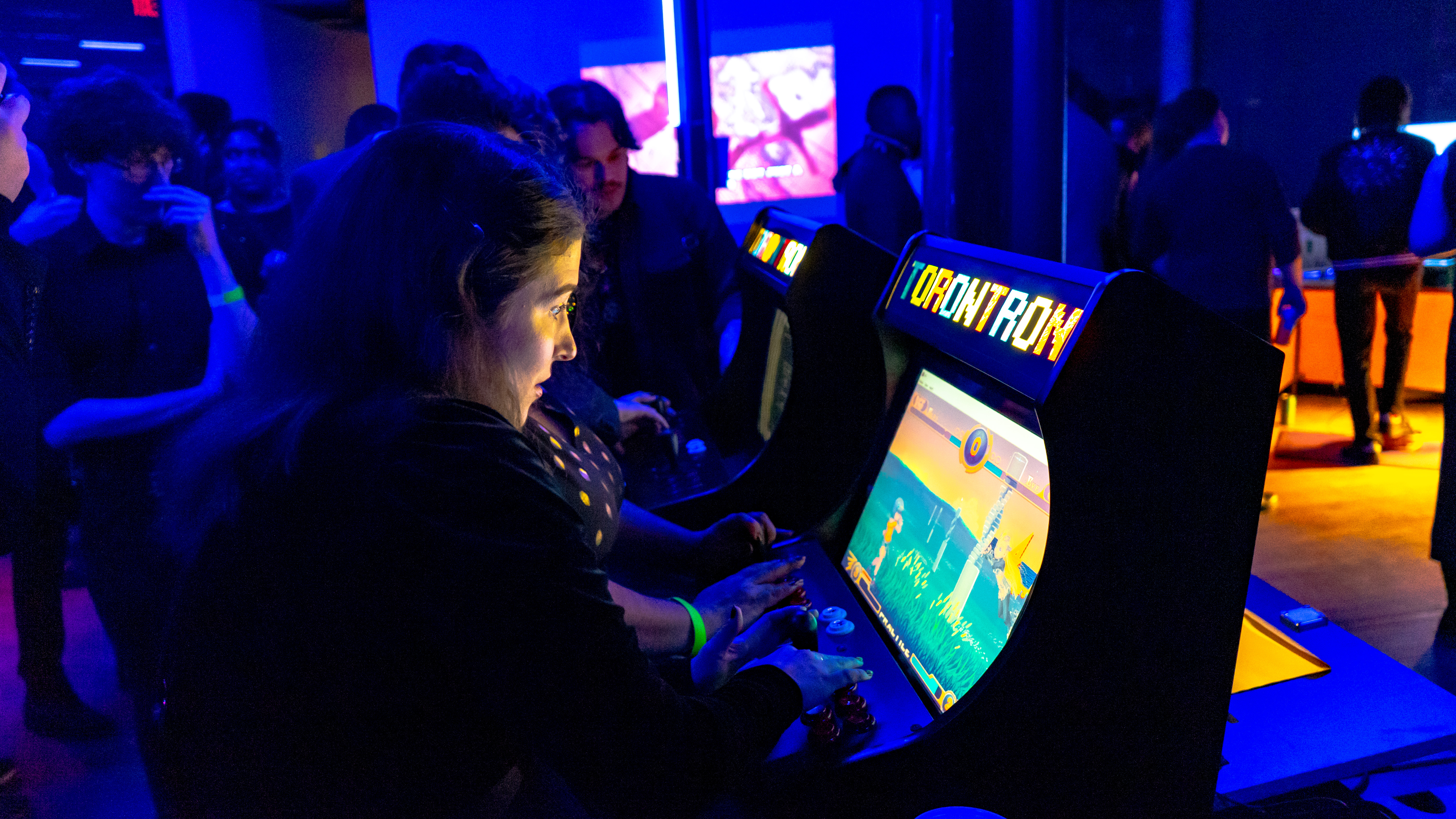
Patrons play Torontron games at the Hand Eye Society Ball 2024.

Torontrons: The Torontron is a classic-style arcade cabinet initiative launched by the Hand Eye Society in 2009 to showcase local indie games in public spaces across Toronto. Inspired by the MAME cabinet, it has appeared in bars, festivals, and cultural venues, helping make Toronto’s game culture more accessible. The project also inspired the Winnitron in Winnipeg, which led to a global network of indie arcade cabinets with active installations in cities worldwide. Originally produced by Jim Munroe, engineered by Jph Wacheski, and deployed by Adam Axbey, several more have been produced over the years. Torontrons remain one of Hand Eye Society’s signature and best-known initiatives.

Torontrons have been featured in many events across Toronto for over a decade. Events Torontrons have appeared in include, Nuit Blanche Festival Toronto, the Canadian Zine Fair Canzine Toronto Fan Expo, Flash In The Can, Toronto Comic Arts Festival Function 13, InterAccess Gamercamp, and Doors Open Toronto

Workshops: The Hand Eye Society has historically offered various workshop programs to increase the accessibility of game development for communities of all backgrounds and ages across Toronto. Workshops are instructed by Hand Eye Society staff and professionals from all facets of the industry to suit the needs of the community. As of 2020, the Hand Eye Society launched accessible online workshop programs, which have reached participants from all across the world. Futures Forward: Operated in partnership with Ontario Creates, Futures Forward is an annual business training program designed to prepare new studio founders how to operate a game studio in Ontario. Providing mentorship, resources, and a critical sense of community, this 2-month course has resulted in several developers incorporating several new Ontario game studios and successfully releasing games, including critically lauded titles such as A Short Hike, Hill Agency, Civic Story, Crafty Survivors, CURSES, Umami Grove, Retroronto, and many more.

Mixtapes: To celebrate the innovative and often DIY nature of indie games, the ‘Mixtapes’ keeps the spirit of its namesake as a curated selection of submitted indie games made by the community and released to the wider Hand Eye Society audience. This concept was intentionally conceived to increase the visibility of smaller indie games and compensate participating game developers.

In addition to these initiatives, the Hand Eye Society has had many other initiatives over its history that have either ended, become defunct, or are on hiatus. These initiatives include Game Curious, Hand Eye Hangouts, The Toronto Video Game Database, Artsy Game Incubator, Camp Make-A-Game, Difference Game Initiative, YYZ Game Show, and HES TV.

== Festivals & Events ==
Super FESTival: Combining previous festivals (such as Comics X Games and Wordplay) into one, Super FESTival was launched in 2022 using the Hand Eye Society’s FEST web technology to create remote and hybrid festivals, which feature games from around the world, while further making them accessible internationally by broadcasting games, talks, and workshops on Twitch. As of 2024, it has become a hybrid festival that takes place online and across Toronto.

Hand Eye Society Ball: Since 2014, the annual Hand Eye Society Ball has been one of the most anticipated dates in the Toronto game community calendar. Each year, a site-specific game is custom-created for attendees to enjoy alongside novel alternative controller games sourced from international creatives in a classy dance party setting. The event has been hosted at historic venues across Toronto, including the Art Gallery of Ontario, the Masonic Temple and Cecil Community Centre

Comics X Games: Historically run alongside the Toronto Comic Arts Festival, Comics X Games was an experiment in cross-media collaboration, partnering game creators with comic artists to produce short, unique interactive experiences for exhibition.

In later years, this initiative broadened its scope, becoming a showcase for visual novel-style games produced within the community. It has since been combined with other events to form Super FESTival.

Wordplay: Launching in 2012, Hand Eye Society partnered with the Toronto Reference Library to host an annual celebration of narrative-driven games, combining literature and play. The festival included a curated selection of innovative story-led games as well as talks from writers and developers.

Now part of SuperFESTival, the original formatting showcased works from some of the most notable names in narrative games, such as Sam Barlow, Emily Short, and Christine Love.

== Community Collaborations ==
The Hand Eye Society regularly collaborates with various community organizations, studios, and agencies to increase public access to games and game arts in new ways. The organization also aims to serve underserved communities and use games for transformative purposes in community spaces. Organizations the Hand Eye Society has collaborated with include the City Of Toronto, Ontario Creates, Toronto Public Library, Toronto Metropolitan University, University of Toronto, TOJam, Evergreen Brick Works, Ubisoft, Snapchat, Toronto International Film Festival, InterAccess, Lockwood, and more. The Hand Eye Society was also responsible for the development of virtual festivals using their FEST technology for CanZine (2020, 2021) and the Toronto Comic Arts Festival (2021). The Hand Eye Society's activities are funded by paid memberships, studio sponsorships, and public funds from organizations such as Toronto Arts Council and Ontario Arts Council.

== Public Accounts ==
- Website
- Itch.io
- Twitch
- YouTube
- Facebook
- Twitter
- Bluesky
- Instagram
- Tiktok

== Additional Notes ==
- Founded in 2009, the Hand Eye Society is one of, if not the, oldest game arts non-profits in the world.
- While based in Toronto, Ontario, Canada, the Hand Eye Society works with studios, artists, and organizations from around the world.
- The Hand Eye Society’s current logo was designed by Canadian Artist Josh Holinaty
