= Rachel Lindsay =

Rachel Lindsay may refer to:

- a pseudonym of Roberta Leigh, British author, artist, composer and television producer
- Rachel Lindsay (television personality), best known for her role as a contestant on The Bachelor and as the lead on The Bachelorette
- Rachel Lindsay (cartoonist) (born 1987), American cartoonist
