= Max Douglas =

Canadian comic book creator (born 1970)

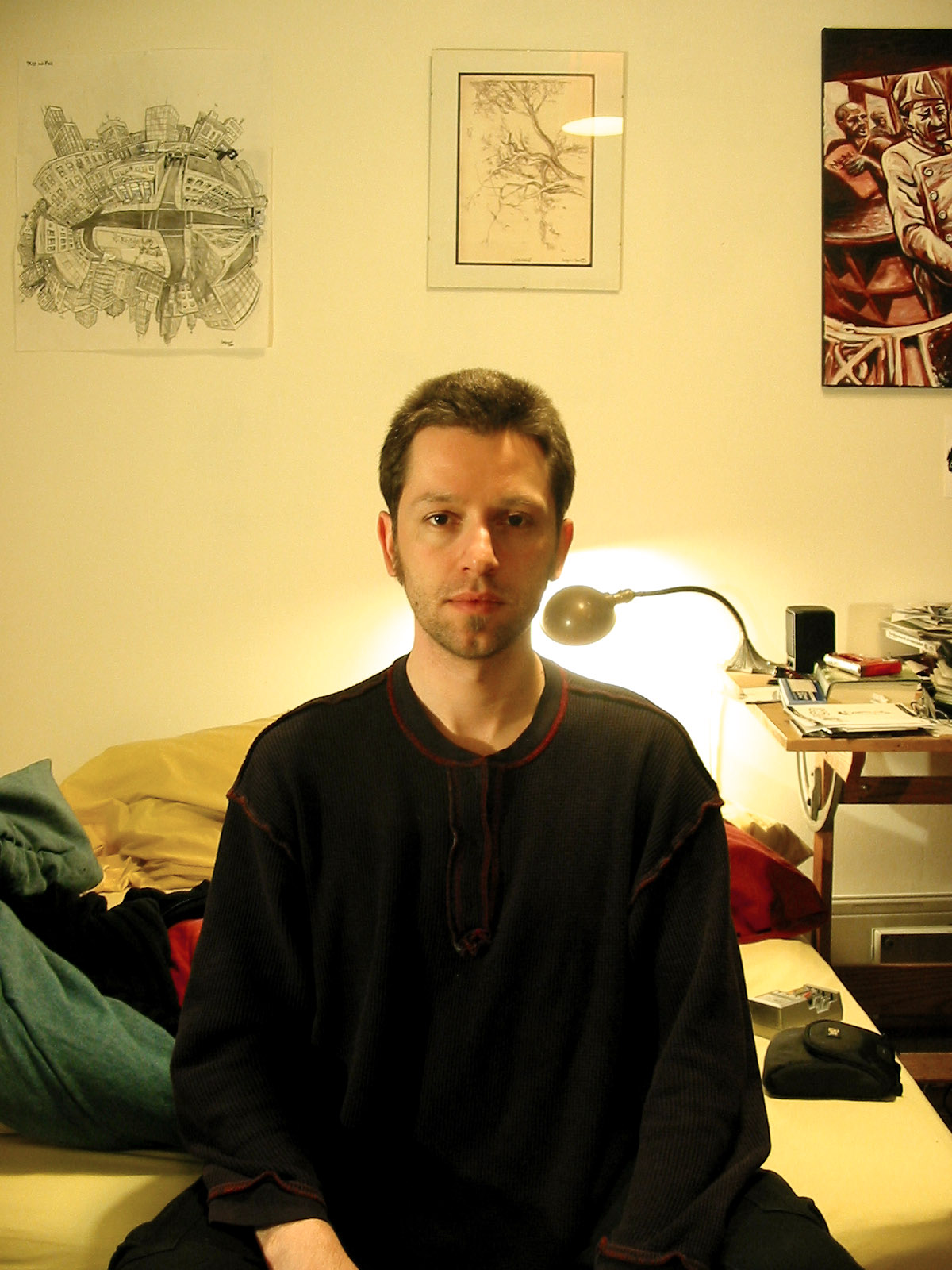
- Born: Maxim Douglas; September 15, 1970 (age 56) Toronto, Ontario, Canada
- Areas: Cartoonist, Writer, Penciller, Artist, Inker, Editor, Publisher, Letterer, Colourist
- Pseudonym: Salgood Sam
- Notable works: Therefore Repent! Sea of Red; RevolveЯ Quarterly; Dream Life: a late coming of age

Max Douglas (born September 15, 1970) is a Canadian comic book creator. Since approximately 1996, he has worked under the pen name of Salgood Sam which is derived from a reverse spelling of his name.

== Published works ==
=== Early Career ===
Douglas started drawing in his late teens, producing zines. His first formally published work appeared in a co-created black-and-white comic book for Caliber Comics, titled Nature of the Beast. It was written with Al Roy who also penned a short story that Douglas drew called Captain Censored Vs. Dr. Goingtofar for True North 2, published by the Comic Legends Legal Defense Fund.

=== 1992–2000 ===
In 1992, Douglas started working at Marvel Comics on Clive Barker's Nightbreed No. 20, from the company's Epic Comics imprint.

After that he was hired to draw Nightbreed No. 23, and then assigned Saint Sinner, a new title under the short-lived Razorline imprint, created for Marvel by Clive Barker. Douglas designed the characters, penciled and inked the first four issues of the title, and collaborated on the series until issue No. 5.

For Marvel he also worked on Morbius, the Living Vampire No. 25, a 10-page story titled "Drainage System", scripted by Karl Bollers; Dr. Strange No. 63, "Song of the Blood Opal", by David Quinn; and a Spider-Man 2099 story in 2099 Unlimited No. 8.

He drew the DC Comics character Bloodwynd in Showcase '94 No. 5 (May 1994), before switching to animation for work during much of the latter 1990s, working at Nelvana in Toronto, and CinéGroupe in Montreal.

In the mid-1990s, he also started to sign his art Salgood Sam, a pen name based on the mirror image of his given name and returned to experimenting with self-published zines again as well, publishing a few pamphlets titled Cigarette Smokin’ Coffee Drinkin’ Cafe Chicks & Scrach Scrach

In 2000, he worked for DC under the pseudonym Salgood Sam, Douglas' art appeared in Real Worlds: Wonder Woman Vs. the Red Menace with authors Allan Neuwirth & Glen Hanson.

=== 2001–2010 ===
In 2002 Douglas returned to Marvel briefly to work on Muties No. 1 & No. 6.

In 2003 he worked as an inker on Goran Parlov's pencils for Terminator 3: Before the Rise, published by Beckett Comics.

Douglas then self-published the comic RevolveЯ One in late 2004. A collection of short stories written by Douglas, A.J.Duric, and John O'Brien. It was nominated for Best Emerging Artist by the Doug Wright Awards the following year.

Douglas teamed with Kieron Dwyer and Rick Remender in 2005 to create Sea of Red, a monthly series from Image Comics.

In early 2006, Douglas contributed art to Revolution on the Planet of the Apes, published by Mr. Comics.

In 2007, he drew Therefore Repent!, a graphic novel written by Jim Munroe, published by No Media Kings in Canada and IDW Publishing in the US.

In 2008 he contributed to Comic Book Tattoo, an anthology comic book of stories based on or inspired by songs by American singer-songwriter Tori Amos, published by Image Comics.

In 2009, he illustrated the story Widows, written by Rantz Hoseley, in Awesome 2: Awesomer, an anthology published by Top Shelf Productions in support of a student scholarship for the Center for Cartoon Studies.

In 2010 he contributed a short story to Popgun 4, entitled Honolulu Lorie's Lava Love Lounge and Poodle Emporium, and drew an issue of Ghostbusters written by Dara Naraghi, called Tainted Love for IDW.

In the summer of 2010 Douglas worked with The ARC Ensemble of The Royal Conservatory of Music, on a short animated film for Bravo TV called Honour Bound – The Exile of Adolf Busch. Adolf Busch was one of Europe's finest violinists. The film is an account of his decision to abandon Germany and to choose self-imposed exile rather than compromise with the Nazi regime. His String Sextet was performed by the ARC Ensemble and played alongside illustrations provided by Douglas.

=== Dream Life, a late coming of age ===
From the mid- to late-2000s, Douglas posted art from a planned graphic novel, Dream Life on his site and a live journal blog dedicated to the project. In 2010 he launched Dream Life as a web comic as part of the line up at Transmission X. It's his first effort to both write and draw a long form story. May 2014 he published book one of Dream Life after raising funds via Kickstarter to print it.

=== RevolveЯ a comic anthology ===
In July 2010, Douglas relaunched his earlier self-published collection as an ongoing web comic anthology site. Along with comics he published short stories and poetry on the site erratically. In November 2012 the RevolveЯ site was revamped and the web comics aspect was replaced with a serialized self-published print and digital publication.

=== Comics Journalism ===
Douglas also dabbles in comics journalism, publishing a comics site dedicated Canadian centric news, called Sequential.

=== Teaching ===
Douglas teaches a Dynamic Drawing class at Syn Studio an industry focused art school based in Montreal.

== Comic Jams ==
A Comic jam or Comix Jams are social gatherings loosely based around a constraint-based exercise reminiscent of Raymond Queneau's Oulipo (Workshop for Potential Literature) and its subsequent comics arm, Oubapo (Workshop for Potential Comics). In the 60's in San Francisco, Robert Crumb & the Zap Comix 'all Stars' produced short often non-narrative comix that make the earliest well documented use of the name 'Comix Jam'.

In 1995, Max became involved in organizing collaborative Comix Jams after attending a few in Montreal hosted by Rupert Bottenberg. He helped organize one of the first of such events held in Toronto, arranging to have Rupert and a group of Montreal Jam regulars to attend, and promoting the event locally to the Toronto Comics scene. The event was a success, including coverage from the local media. And inspired one attendee, Zine publisher Dave Howard, to take up hosting similar events on a monthly basis.

After Moving to Montreal Max began hosting monthly Jams there, publishing the pages online and in regular Zines. He hosted the events from 2001 to 2004 approximately.
