= Therefore Repent! =

2007 graphic novel by Jim Munroe

- Date: 2007-08-15
- Main characters: Mummy and Raven
- Page count: 160 pages
- Publisher: No Media Kings; Idea & Design Works

Creative team
- Writers: Jim Munroe
- Artists: Salgood Sam
- ISBN: 978-1600101465

Therefore Repent! is a bestselling Canadian graphic novel written by anarchist freelance writer Jim Munroe and illustrated by Salgood Sam. It is set in a post-apocalyptic Chicago neighbourhood after the predictions of Christian fundamentalists concerning the Rapture have come true, the righteous have risen to Heaven and a society divided between Splitters who believe there will be a second Rapture for those who perform good acts after the first and those who do not. The novel has been called "a progressive, humane rejoinder" to the Christian science fiction novels in the Left Behind series.

== Storyline ==
The protagonists of the novel are Mummy and Raven, lovers who used to have a touring act at raves and festivals where they dressed up as a mummy and a raven. The novel opens as they arrive in Chicago searching for somewhere to live following the Rapture. They meet a local kid in their new neighbourhood who shows them to an empty apartment vacated by its raptured inhabitants. Settling into the squat, Mummy and Raven are happy to live in a world without Christians, unlike Splitters (people who were left behind who strive to become as Christian as possible in order to ascend to Heaven during the Apocalypse). As the story progresses, Mummy and Raven explore the neighbourhood around their apartment, and become disconcerted as the world becomes increasingly unhinged. Militaristic angels appear and begin to kill "sinners" using machine guns, the couple's dog begins to speak, while they and other people start to develop magical powers and forms.

== Reception ==
The graphic novel was a critical and commercial success, attracting critical praise from Quill & Quire ("an absolutely boundless piece of fantasy that he wisely grounds in very human relationships...[t]o say it's an imaginative work would be an understatement"), Junot Díaz, and Annalee Newitz of io9, reaching the Canadian Top 20 bestsellers list, and garnering Munroe a nomination for the 2008 Shuster Award for Outstanding Canadian Comic Book Writer.

== Publication details ==
- Munroe, Jim (2007). Therefore, Repent!. Idea & Design Works Llc. ISBN 978-1-60010-146-5. OCLC 173719952.
