= Yukon Permanent Art Collection =

Art collection in the Yukon, Canada

The Yukon Permanent Art Collection is the permanent art collection of the Yukon Government. Works from the Yukon Permanent Art Collection are exhibited in Yukon Government buildings throughout the Yukon, and occasionally loaned to exhibitions. Currently, the collection is stored at the Yukon Arts Centre, in Whitehorse, Yukon. As of 2021, the collection had over 500 art works. The collection focuses on art works that have a direct connection to the Yukon. The collection was founded in 1981. The collection is supported by the registered charity Friends of the Yukon Permanent Collection founded in 1979. The Friends of the Yukon Permanent Collection and the Yukon Government place a call for submissions annually. The call is open to Yukon artists, Expat Yukon artists, and non Yukon artists whose work resonates with the Yukon. Selection of works to the collection is made by a jury from the Friends of the Yukon Permanent Art Collection.

== Artists in the Yukon Permanent Art Collection ==
- Ted Harrison
- Jim Robb
- Shane Wilson
