= Available Light Film Festival =

The Available Light Film Festival is an annual film festival in Whitehorse, Yukon. Staged annually by the Yukon Film Society, the event presents an annual program of Canadian and international films, concentrating primarily but not exclusively on films made in the Canadian Arctic, British Columbia, Alaska and international Arctic regions.

The event is staged primarily at the Yukon Arts Centre, with selected screenings at other cultural venues in the city.

The festival is classified as a qualifying festival for the Canadian Screen Awards.
