= Kwanlin Dün Cultural Centre =

Cultural center in Whitehorse, Yukon, Canada

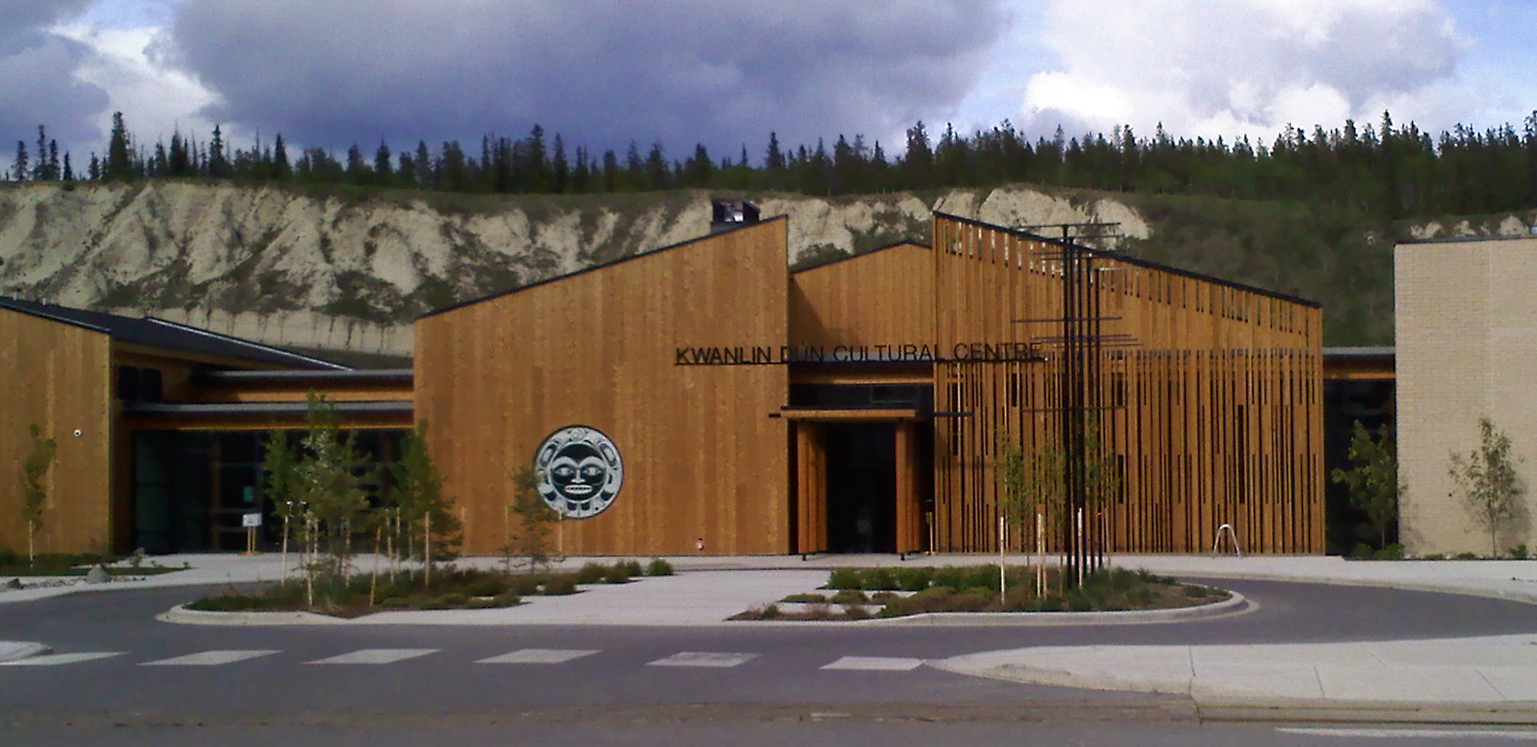
The Kwanlin Dün Cultural Centre.

The Kwanlin Dün Cultural Centre is a cultural centre of the Kwanlin Dün First Nation located in Whitehorse, Yukon, Canada. The centre opened in June 2012. The centre consists of a long house, artists studios, a gallery, classrooms, and an outdoor ceremonial space on the banks of the Yukon River. Attached to the Kwanlin Dün Cultural Centre, but separate, is the Whitehorse Public Library. The centre hosts the Adäka Cultural Festival and the Shakaat Artist Residency during summer months.

== See also ==
- Adäka Cultural Festival
- MacBride Museum of Yukon History
- Yukon Arts Centre
