= Everyone in Silico =

2002 novel by Jim Munroe

- Author: Jim Munroe
- Language: English
- Genre: Post-cyberpunk
- Publisher: No Media Kings
- Publication date: 2002
- Pages: 256
- ISBN: 978-1-56858-240-5

Everyone in Silico is a 2002 post-cyberpunk novel written by Jim Munroe. It was promoted partly by Munroe's attempt to invoice corporations mentioned in the novel for product placement. The title is an intentional reference to an advertising campaign previously run by clothing retailer Gap, one of the companies Munroe sent invoices to.

The novel was published by Munroe's own publishing company, No Media Kings, and an e-book version is available under a Creative Commons license.

== Plot ==
The story is set in Vancouver, 2036.

San Francisco was struck by an earthquake and a company called Self, which is somehow related to Microsoft, set up an AI system to replace the city, with a virtual environment called Frisco.

The story follows several people, both in Vancouver as well as in Frisco.

== Reception ==
Reactions to Everyone in Silico were generally positive, with reviews comparing the work favourably to those of Bruce Sterling, Douglas Coupland and Philip K. Dick. Other reviewers were impressed with the humour and the level of detail presented of life in the novel's futuristic world, although some comment that the complexity of the plot made for a confusing read.
