= Keno City Mining Museum =

Museum in Keno City, Yukon, Canada

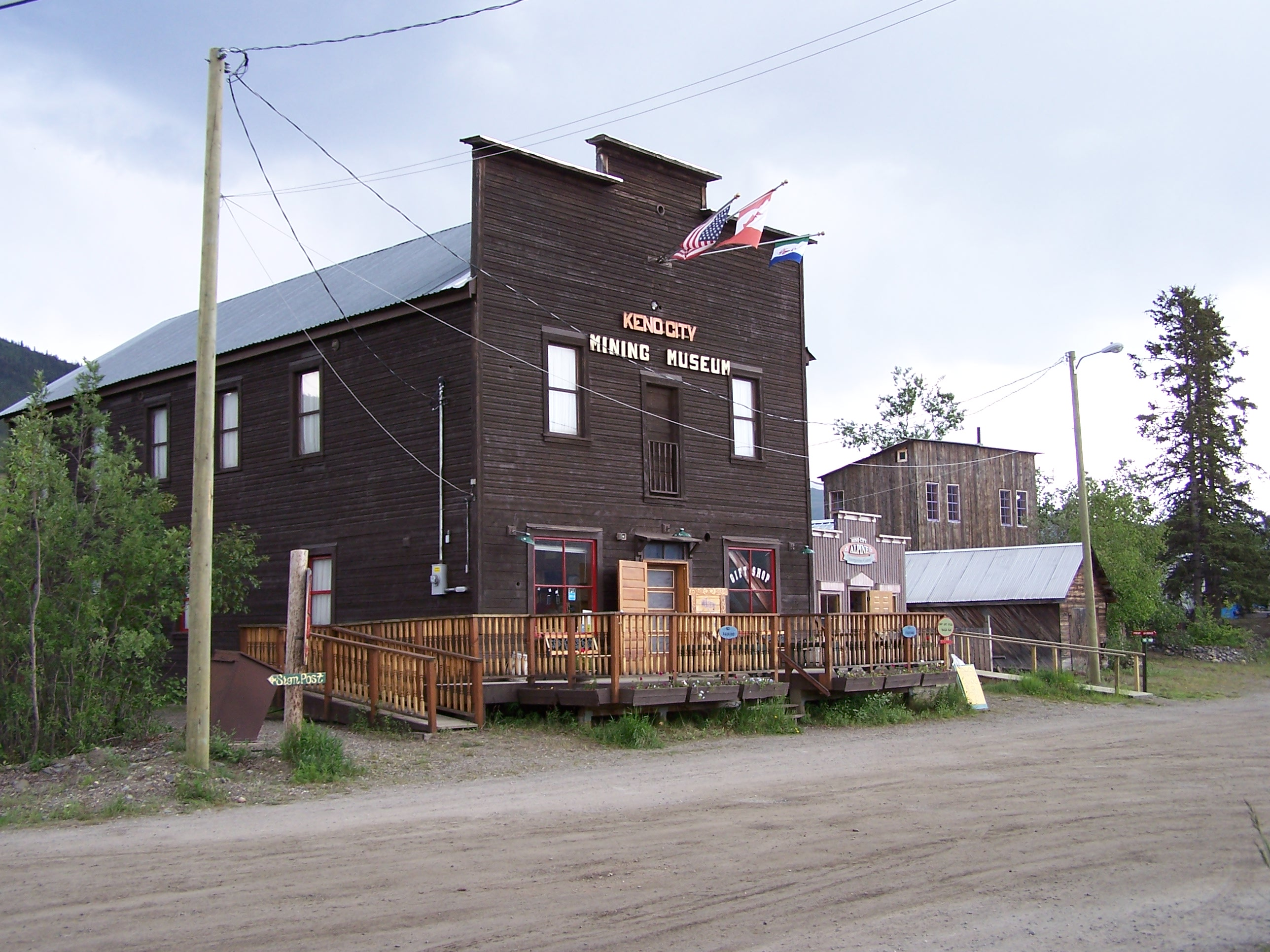
- Established: c.1979
- Location: Keno City Mining Museum
- Coordinates: 63.9096°N 135.3028°W
- Type: Mining
- Collections: Artifacts and photographs
- Visitors: Approximately 2,000 (1991)

Keno City Mining Museum is a history museum located in Keno City, Yukon, Canada. It was established around 1979 and has artifacts related to the area's gold and silver mining.

The museum occupies Jackson Hall, the city's former community centre built in 1922. It was established in 1979 with the assistance of Terry J. Levicki, a geologist who worked for United Keno Hill Mines Ltd., a company in Elsa.

The museum is open to visitors from June to September. Around 1991, the museum received roughly 500 visitors each month during its annual four months of operation.

== Artifacts ==
The museum displays objects such as equipment, and memorabilia. It has a large collection of photographs on the second floor and a garage across the street that stores bigger items. Some of the artifacts are as follows:

- Listerine bottle circa 1900
- Rocking wooden washer
- Tins of Lucky Strike Cola
- The original telephone exchange that was used to send and receive all calls at the time
- Handmade axes
- Large saws that were needed to create ice blocks
- Safety helmets
- Drill bits
- A bucket that was hand-cranked to bring ore to the surface from underground locations
- An addressograph for producing employee pay checks that is said to have been used up until about 1981.
- The upstairs houses a myriad of old photos.
