= Adäka Cultural Festival =

Festival in Whitehorse, Yukon, Canada

The Adäka Cultural Festival ('Adäka' or 'Festival') is an annual multi-disciplinary arts and culture festival in Whitehorse, Yukon that celebrates First Nations arts and culture, with a specific focus on Yukon First Nations. 'Adäka', in the Southern Tutchone language, means 'coming into the light' which reflects the Yukon First Nations arts and culture being brought forward to the public eye and celebrated by all. The Festival name was inspired by the work of Joe Johnson, the late father of Festival co-founder, Katie Johnson. Several years prior to the launch of Adäka, Johnson had been involved in a conference of the same name. That conference brought the people of the Yukon together to identify areas of concern and exchange thoughts on heritage and culture in the Yukon. The conference aimed to initiate dialogue between the two main Yukon cultures so that everyone could "come into the light" together.

The Adäka Cultural Festival has moved from an outdoor street location to the Kwanlin Dün Cultural Centre, ideally located beside the Yukon River in Whitehorse, Yukon. Since its launch in 2011, Adäka has grown to include national and international artists coming from British Columbia, Alberta, Manitoba, Ontario, Quebec, Northwest Territories, Nunavut, United States, Greenland, and New Zealand.

The Adäka Cultural Festival is hosted by the Yukon First Nations Culture and Tourism Association (YFNCT). YFNCT is a not-for-profit organization "committed to growing, promoting and celebrating strong and sustainable Yukon First Nations arts, culture and tourism sectors." The Festival office is located in the Yukon First Nations Culture and Tourism Association office in Whitehorse, Yukon.

== Objectives ==
The Festival objectives are:

- To stimulate, facilitate, and foster the preservation and development of Yukon First Nations arts and culture.
- Expand markets for First Nations cultural industries within Yukon, as well as nationally and internationally.
- Create networking opportunities for Yukon First Nations artists to gain inspiration and to exchange ideas, knowledge, and skills
- Brand the event and Yukon as a preferred tourism destination
- Build new and strengthen existing partnerships that create long lasting sustainable benefits to the Yukon First Nations arts and culture sector.

== Festival program description ==
Indigenous art workshops have been included in the festival program since its birth. During the week-long festival, Indigenous performing artists showcase their historic and modern-day culture through traditional dancing and drumming, folk, rock, storytelling, comedy, fiddling, country/gospel, and contemporary music. The Festival's art gallery and gift shop allows artists to sell their work to festival visitors. By including Elder and youth participation and workshops, In more recent years, a fashion show has been an addition to the festival program which showcases modern and traditional Indigenous designs. Other aspects of the festival program include activities for children, ticketed events, artist collaboration, networking opportunities, film screenings, arts and cultural demonstrations, and community events. The Adäka Cultural Festival is a primarily free event. However, the ticketed events, workshops and purchasing artwork all have an associated cost.

== Awards ==
In 2015, the Adäka Cultural Festival won the Yukon Tourism Award of Excellence and was nominated for Cultural Tourism Award from Tourism Industry Association of Canada. This is proving its growth and national attention as an arts and culture festival in the north.
