= Jph Wacheski =

Canadian musician and game developer

- Born: Ottawa, Ontario, Canada
- Citizenship: Canadian
- Occupations: Musician, independent video game developer

Jph Wacheski, also known as Jeff, is a musician and independent video game developer from Ottawa, Ontario, Canada.

== Game development ==
Wacheski develops games under the studio name Iteration Games. His games typically feature a retro arcade aesthetic with a modern sound design.

LockOn and Valence both received the "Top Dog" award at Home of the Underdogs. Several of Wacheski's games have been featured on the Independent Gaming Web's blog. His games have been included in collections of free independent games, online, and on CD-ROMs packaged with magazines.

=== Releases ===
- LockOn (2003)
- Joust 3: Revenge of the Lava Troll (2003)
- Seeds: Three Birds of the Apocalypse (2003)
- Wizard of Wor (remake) (2003)
- Electric Yo-Yo (remake) (2003)
- Valence (2004)
- Sub Atomic (2004)
- Lunar Rescue (2005)
- Quiescence (2005)
- 100 Invaders (2006)
- Cathode Raygun (2006)
- Forward (2006)
- Upstream (2006)

== Music ==
Wacheski has released music and performed live under various names, including And the Earth Died Screaming, Zug Island, and Jph Wacheski.

He has performed at events primarily in and around Toronto, including A Month of Sundays (2001), Aspect (2002), and The Ambient Ping (together with Leif Bloomquist as Jamming Signal, 2003).
