= Cole Pauls =

Canadian comic book author

- Occupation: comic book writer

Cole Pauls is a Canadian comic book writer, from Haines Junction, Yukon.

He is a member of the Tahltan First Nation, and his Dakwäkãda Warriors series is written in English and Southern Tutchone.

In an interview with High Country News, Pauls described how he was inspired to write his comic by his desire to help Native children.

CBC Books placed his book on its recommended reading list for the winter of 2020.
