= Rachel Lindsay (cartoonist) =

American Cartoonist

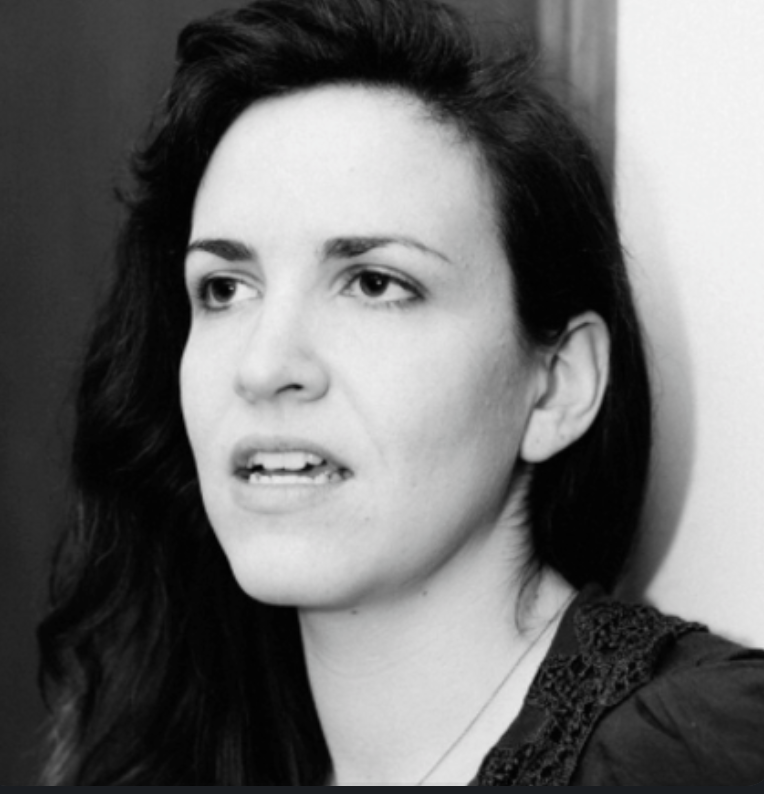
Rachel Lindsay (2018)

Rachel Lindsay (born 1987) is an American cartoonist, educator, musician, and patient-centric mental health advocate. She is best known for her book, RX: A Graphic Memoir, and her weekly comic strip, Rachel Lives Here Now, which runs in Vermont's Seven Days (newspaper) newspaper. She has also appeared in The New Yorker, Spiralbound, Issue #4 of James Kochalka's Superf*ckers Forever series, The Ladybroad Ledger, and The Maple Key Comics Anthology.

== Career ==
Lindsay pursued comics professionally beginning in 2013, after moving to Burlington, Vermont with the intention of creating her first graphic novel. There, she worked as a cashier at City Market, and began a blog, "Rachel Lives Here Now", based on her experiences living in the small city and working at the co-op, "the water cooler of Burlington." In 2016, the 8-panel comic strip was picked up by Seven Days.

In 2018, RX: A Graphic Memoir was released by Grand Central Publishing. RX has been recognized for its contribution to the comics discourse on mental health and hospitalization, garnering reviews and coverage internationally. It was also the featured book for US National Network of Libraries of Medicine's mental health month 2019, and was included on the American Association of Medical Colleges' top ten summer reads list 2019. Its pages were have been featured in multiple traveling exhibitions of work in Graphic Medicine, and was featured in the Billy Ireland Cartoon Library & Museum "Drawing Blood" exhibition (2019), The Naughton Gallery at Queen's "Sorry I've Been A Stranger Lately" exhibition (2022), and other comics shows internationally.

== Speaking ==
Lindsay has spoken about her work at the Columbia University Narrative MedicineNarrative medicine Rounds, Harvard Medical School, The Miami Book Fair, the Toronto Comics Arts Festival, Cartoon Crossroads Columbus, Mount Sinai Hospital's Icahn School of Medicine and other universities, conferences, and conventions. She was also a guest on Paul Gilmartin's podcast Mental Illness Happy Hour in 2020.
