= Gord Hill =

Canadian indigenous cartoonist and activist

- Born: 1968 (age 57–58)
- Occupations: Artist; Author; Campaigner
- Notable work: The 500 Years of Resistance Comic Book

Gord Hill is an artist, author, political activist, and member of the Kwakwaka'wakw nation in British Columbia, Canada. His activism has focused on Indigenous issues since 1988, participating in numerous protests, blockades, rallies, and other movements. He lives in Downtown Eastside, Vancouver, British Columbia. Hill is best-known for his series of graphic novels detailing various issues regarding indigenous decolonization, anti-capitalism, anti-globalization and anti-fascism, with a specific focus on armed struggle.

== Activism ==
Hill's political activism goes back to the 1990s. In a 2017 interview with Crimethinc he was described as an anarchist.

== Publications ==
Hill's first publication was "The 500 Years of Resistance Comic Book", which was adapted from a 1992 essay of the same name and reprinted in 2020. A review in Left History praised its use of the graphic form to convey colonial history. BC Studies praised Hill's approach to comic-book writing as an Indigenous artist.

He wrote "The Anti-Capitalist Resistance Comic Book" (2012) and "The Antifa Comic Book" (2018) at the behest of his publisher following the 2017 Unite the Right rally in Charlottesville, Virginia.

== Publications ==
- The 500 Years of Resistance Comic Book (2010) – (ISBN 978-1-55152-360-6
- The Anti-Capitalist Resistance Comic Book: From the WTO to the G20 (2012) – (ISBN 978-1-55152-444-3)
- The Antifa Comic Book (2018) – (ISBN 1551527332; ISBN 978-1551527338)
- Direct Action Gets the Goods: A Graphic History of the Strike in Canada (2019) – (ISBN 978-1771134170)
- The 500 Years of Indigenous Resistance Comic Book: Revised and Expanded (2021) – (ISBN 1551528525; ISBN 978-1551528526)

== See also ==
- Gord Hill's statement on the 2010 Winter Games in Vancouver – featured on Balaclava!, a newspaper by the Vancouver Media Co-op: https://www.yumpu.com/en/document/read/53768296
- Archived version of no2010.com, a site documenting the movement against the 2010 Winter Games, maintained by Gord Hill.
