= Jim Munroe =

Canadian science fiction author

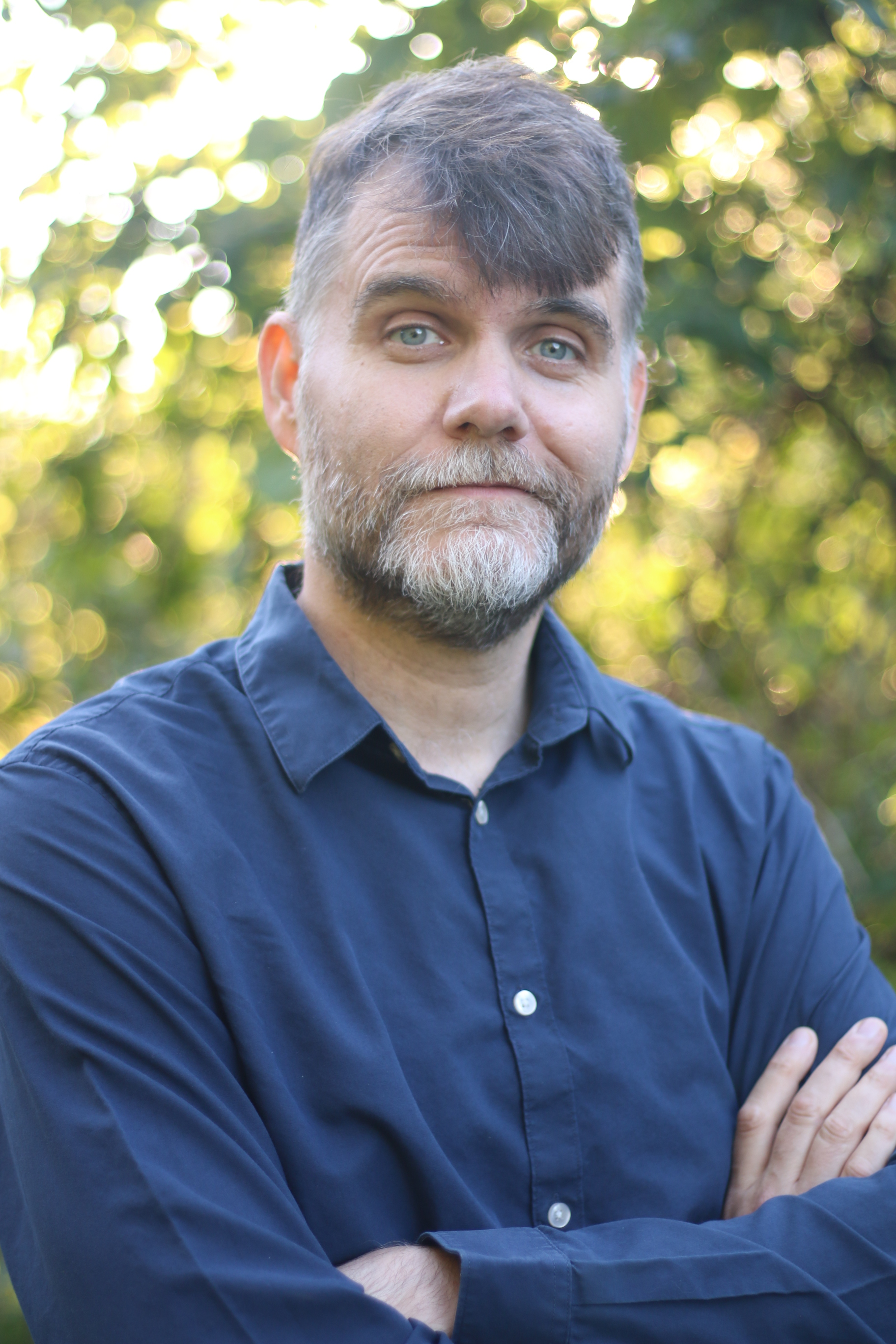
- Occupations: science fiction writer, graphic novelist
- Writing career
- Period: 1990s–present
- Notable works: Everyone in Silico, Therefore Repent!, Angry Young Spaceman

Jim Munroe is a Canadian science fiction author, independent game developer, filmmaker, and cultural organizer. Munroe was managing editor at the magazine Adbusters in the 1990s, before publishing his debut novel Flyboy Action Figure Comes With Gasmask in 1999. The novel was put out by HarperCollins, a major publishing company owned by Rupert Murdoch, and though the book was successful, Munroe so disliked the experience that he launched No Media Kings as a venue for publishing and promoting his own works independently, and a guide to self-publishing for other prospective writers. The book was shortlisted for the Books in Canada First Novel Award in 2000.

In 2000, Munroe released Angry Young Spaceman through No Media Kings. He followed up with Everyone in Silico in 2002, which was promoted partly by Munroe's attempt to invoice corporations mentioned in the novel for product placement. An Opening Act of Unspeakable Evil, a novel written in the form of blog entries, followed in 2004.

Munroe wrote the graphic novels Therefore Repent!, published in 2007, and Sword of My Mouth, published in 2010, both set in post-Rapture Chicago and Detroit. In 2022, he released We Are Raccoons, a science fiction novel about independent video game designers who accidentally create a superintelligence.

== Bibliography ==
=== Novels ===
- Flyboy Action Figure Comes with Gasmask (1999)
- Angry Young Spaceman (2000)
- Everyone in Silico (2002)
- An Opening Act of Unspeakable Evil (2004)
- We Are Raccoons (2022)

=== Graphic Novels ===
- Therefore Repent! (2007)
- Sword of My Mouth (2010)
- Zeroed Out (2025)

== Video games ==
Munroe wrote the game Unmanned (2012), which places the player in the role of a drone bomber pilot, which was featured in the Sundance Film Festival New Frontier section and which won the Grand Jury Award at IndieCade and two Games for Change awards. Guilded Youth (2012), one of his interactive fiction works, came in third place in the 2012 Interactive Fiction Competition and won the Best NPC Award at the 2012 XYZZY Awards.

In 2009, Munroe co-founded the Toronto-based Hand Eye Society, which supports the creation and appreciation of video games as an artistic medium. He currently runs the Game Arts International Network, a registered not-for-profit focused on interconnecting existing game arts organizations and nurturing new structures in emerging regions. GAIN’s projects include Toronto Games Week and Game Arts International Assembly (GAIA).

Munroe was the Artist-in-Residence at the Art Gallery of Ontario in 2014, where he introduced interactive installations such as the Torontrons, classic arcade cabinets modified to showcase locally developed video games.

== Honors and awards ==
- Interactive Fiction Competition:
  - Everybody Dies (2008) – 3rd Place, Miss Congeniality Award (2nd Place)
  - Guilded Youth (2012) – 3rd Place, Miss Congeniality Award Winner
- IndieCade: Unmanned (2012) – Grand Jury Award
- Games for Change Awards: Unmanned (2012) – Two awards
- Joe Shuster Award: Nominated for Therefore Repent! (2008)
