= MacBride Copperbelt Mining Museum =

Museum in Whitehorse, Yukon, Canada

Coordinates: 60.7434°N 135.1312°W

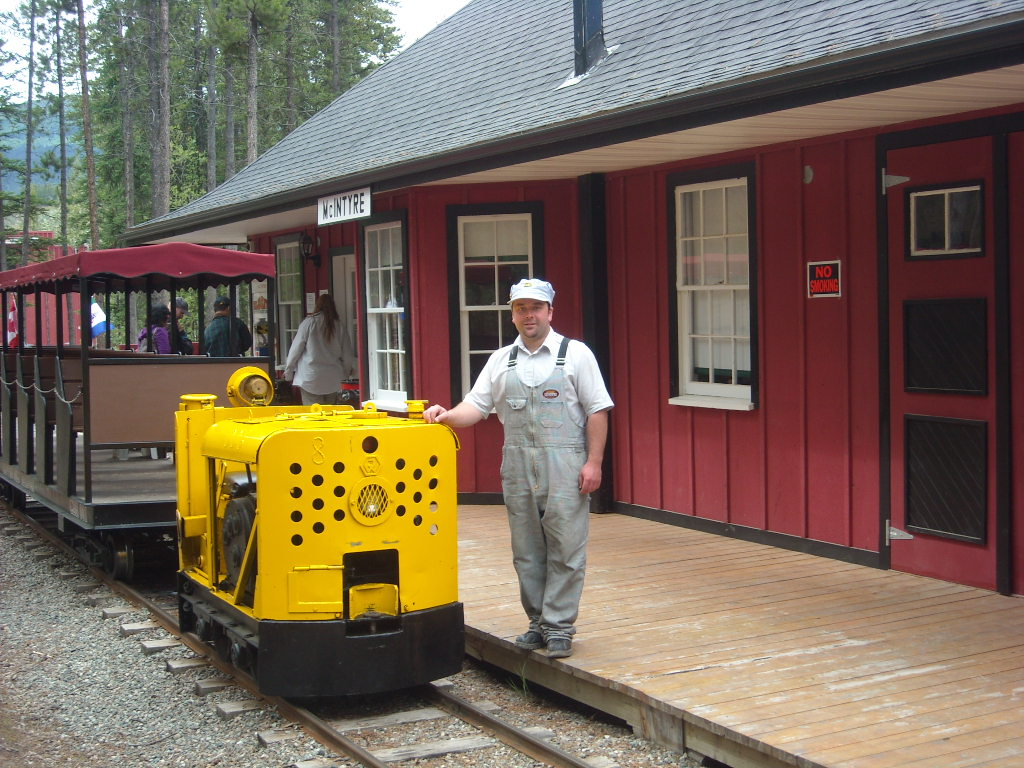
A conductor in front of the Copperbelt Museum next to the Lokie train

The MacBride Copperbelt Mining Museum formally the Copperbelt Railway & Mining Museum (CR&MM) is run by the Miles Canyon Historic Railway Society (MCHRS), which consists of a board of six members. The objectives of the society are to: a) To preserve, promote and to protect the railway heritage of the Yukon; b) To develop and operate the Waterfront Trolley; c) To develop and operate the Copperbelt Railway & Mining Museum; and d) To promote and enhance tourism development in the city of Whitehorse and the Yukon.

The eight hectare parcel of land that the CR&MM is located at was provided by the Yukon Electrical Company in 1998. Construction on the first loop section of narrow gauge track began the same year, further sections were added in subsequent years with a 1.8 km figure eight configuration that is in operation as of 2011.

The museum is located at 91928 Alaska Highway - two kilometres north of Two Miles Hill. The museum itself was built from blueprints to replicate a train station built in 1906. The museum is open 7 days a week, from 10am – 5pm starting in early June to Labour Day weekend in September. It is a non-profit museum that relies on government funding and donations from tourists and patrons.

The Whitehorse Waterfront Trolley is also managed by the MCHRS on behalf of the Yukon Territorial Government.

== History of the CR&MM ==
The CR&MM is located on a rich copper-bearing skarn, 4 km west of the city of Whitehorse. Copper deposits were first discovered in this area in 1898 as Gold Rush Stampeders were making their way to Dawson. Because of the Gold Rush, most people overlooked the outcroppings of copper on their way to the Klondike. However, a few men did choose to stay in Whitehorse to stake claims. Some of these more notable individuals were John McIntyre, William P. Grainger, John Hanly, Andrew Olsen, Ole Dickson, H.E. Porter and Sam McGee.

McIntyre staked the first claim on July 6, 1898, and called it the Copper King. Grainger staked a claim just north of the Copper King and named it the Copper Queen. Copper King was found to be more prosperous than the Copper Queen, which led Grainger to buy a 50% share for $1,000.00. The early prospecting of copper was done largely by surface prospecting and underground tunnelling. Work began on the Copper King in 1899. The first shipment of ore out of the Copper King yielded nine tons of handpicked ore, which consisted of 46.4% copper, 11 ounces of silver and $2.58 of gold per ton. The very high concentration of copper from the Copper King reflected common high-grade mining practice of the time; a typical 21st century copper mine will have 0.4 to 1% copper present in the ore. The Copper King would later be sold by Grainger to a Pennsylvanian syndicate for $210,000 and a percentage of royalties. Tragically, Grainger died a few days later in the mines of carbon monoxide poisoning, also known as the 'black damp' by miners.

Nearly 500 stakes were claimed on the Copperbelt by 1905. The staked claims covered an area approximately 100 square miles (260 km^{2}) going 20 km north to south from Fish Lake to McCrae. The actual Copperbelt area is 30 km in length, extending from an area south of the Klondike and Alaska Highway to an area west of the Porter Creek subdivision. Due to the high costs of moving the ore out of the Copperbelt, construction of a spur line started in 1907 that would connect McCrae to the principal mines. Because of the fluctuations in copper prices in the following years, construction on the 12-mile (19 km) spur lines was fraught with delays and work stoppages. It was finally completed in 1910 at the Pueblo Mine.

The most prosperous of all early copper mining was done at the Pueblo mine, staked by John Hanly in 1898. It was located along the Fish Lake Rd. The mine was ploughed over in 1986 to make way for the Icy Waters fish farm.

The mines in and around the Copperbelt needed a lot of wood to fuel the boilers. In 1914, the Pueblo mine's 3 boilers burned 3000 cords of wood during its year of operation. By 1916, the Pueblo was at the peak of its production extracting ore at a value of $763, 586. The copper mining along the Copperbelt brought about economic prosperity to Whitehorse when prices were high, but conversely brought bust times when prices were low. An example of this in 1911, saw the population in Whitehorse decrease by 20–30% with the temporary closure of the Pueblo mine, along with layoffs at White Pass. The worst mining accident in the Yukon occurred at the Pueblo mine in the spring of 1917. A cave-in at the 200–400 foot level left nine miners trapped. An 85-foot (26 m) drift through solid granite reached three of the miners within 72 hours. Rescue work continued for eight more days, but was deemed too dangerous leaving six miners entombed in the mine. Investigation of the accident found that due to the mine being a 'wet mine', underground watercourses caused water to accumulate and create great pressure which caused the weakest section of the mine to collapse. A plaque commemorating the six miners stands near the Fish Lake Rd turn off, along the Alaska Highway.
