= Yukon Arts Centre =

- Established: 29 May 1992; 33 years ago
- Location: 300 University Drive; Whitehorse, Yukon, Canada
- Coordinates: 60.7500°N 135.09454°W
- Type: Arts centre and museum
- Visitors: 85,011 (FY2018–2019) (Note: During the fiscal year of 2018–2019, a total of 85,011 people visited the Yukon Arts Centre. The Yukon Arts Centre saw 51,918 visitors visit its art gallery, and 47,713 visitors attend a theatre performance that year.)
- Executive director: Casey Prescott
- Website: www.yukonartscentre.com

The Yukon Arts Centre (YAC) an arts centre and gallery located in Whitehorse, Yukon, Canada. The art centre opened in May 1992 and contains a 428-seat theatre, and a 390-square-metre-art gallery (4,200 sq ft) used to hosts arts performances and exhibitions. The arts centre permanent collection of visual art includes over 100 works from artists throughout northern Canada.

== History ==
Prior to the completion of the Yukon Arts Centre, musical and theatre performances in Whitehorse were typically conducted in borrowed spaces and venues; including the local courthouse, and in the gym of F. H. Collins Secondary School. In 1980 the Arts Canada North Society was established to advocate to the federal, territorial and municipal governments for an arts centre in Whitehorse.

After nearly a decade of lobbying, all three levels of government provided CA$9 million for the purposes of establishing a new arts venue. Two locations were initially proposed for the arts centre, along the riverfront in downtown Whitehorse, or adjacent to Yukon University. The site adjacent to the college was selected after the territorial government provided a guarantee it would cover the centre's maintenance and operations costs for the building if it was situated there. In 1988, the territorial government passed the Arts Centre Act, which confirmed that the territorial government would own the facility the art centre operated out of, and it would pay for the building's maintenance. The Yukon Arts Centre was formally opened into the public on 29 May 1992.

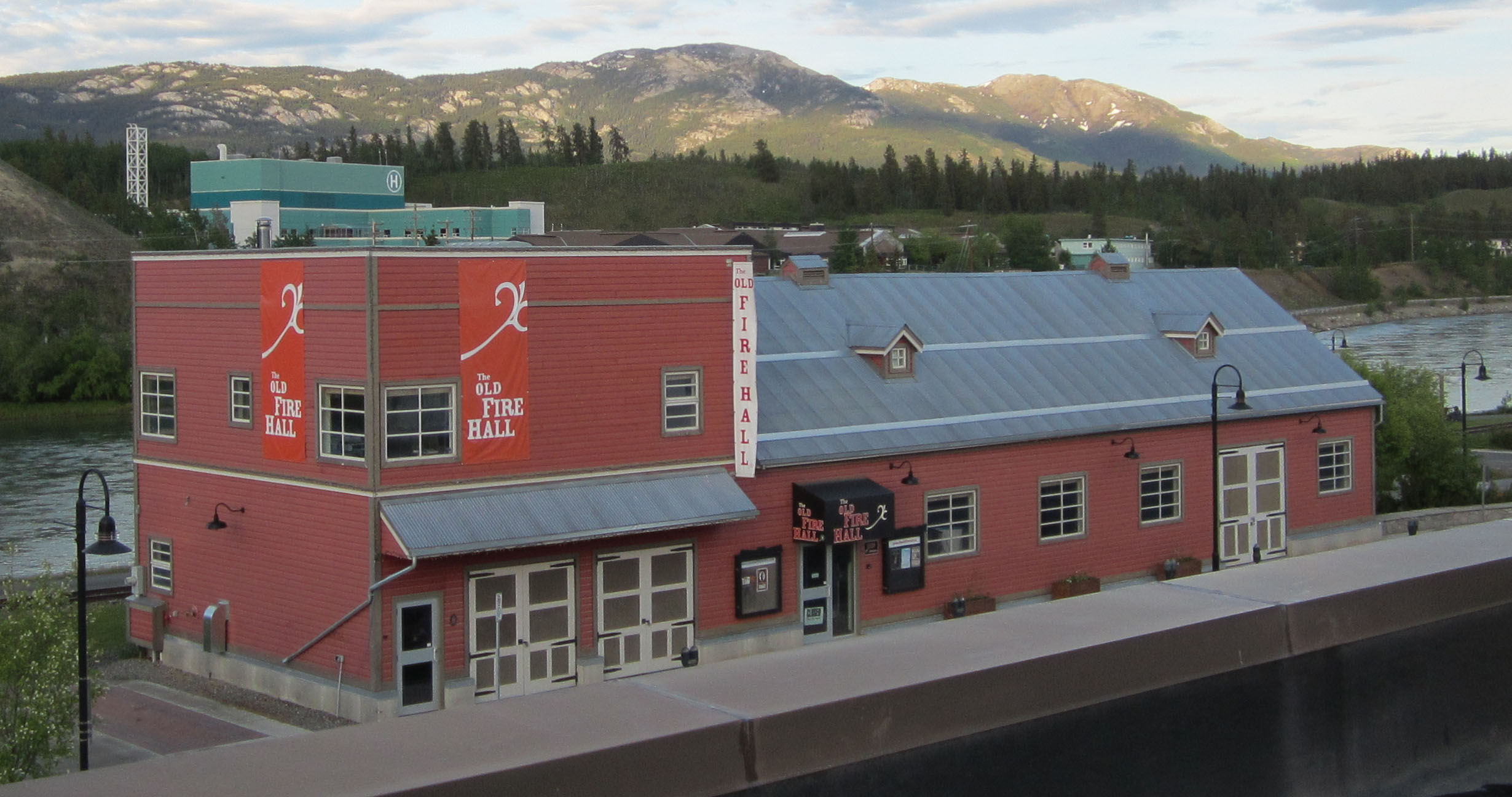
The Old Fire Hall in downtown Whitehorse. The arts centre began to organize arts performances and exhibitions in the Old Fire Hall in 2007.

In 2007 the arts centre hosted arts performances at the Old Fire Hall in downtown Whitehorse. In April 2008, the Yukon Arts Centre announced it formed a partnership with the Whitehorse Chamber of Commerce to use the Old Fire Hall as a year-round venue to host events organized by the arts centre.

In 2016, the Magnetic North Theatre Festival was held in Whitehorse, with the Yukon Arts Centre named a presenting partner for the festival. In the same year, the Yukon Arts Centre opened an art gallery and storefront in Carcross, in partnership with the Tagish First Nation.

The centre is also a main, but not exclusive, venue for the Available Light Film Festival.

== Building ==
The Yukon Arts Centre is located southeast of Yukon University's main campus in Whitehorse, Yukon, Canada. The facility houses a theatre for arts performances, and an art museum. Situated off centre to the building, the theatre features 306 seats on its main level, 112 seats on its balcony, and 10 spaces for wheelchairs. The stage itself is 14-metre-wide (47 ft) and has a depth of 11 metres (37 ft). A loading dock at the back of the theatre stage provides immediate outdoor access from the stage. In addition to the main theatre, other facilities used by arts performers include the green room, studio rehearsal theatre, and dressing rooms. The building also contains an art museum with three galleries; encompassing 390 square metres (4,200 sq ft) of floor space. Other facilities in the building includes a bar station, community gallery space, and offices.

== Operations ==
A number of arts exhibitions relating to music, the performing arts, and visual arts are organized and hosted at the Yukon Arts Centre; including several travelling exhibitions. The arts centre also funds several other programs, including an artist-in-residence program at the arts centre, known as @YAC Residency.

=== Permanent collection ===
The art centre also has a permanent collection that includes over 100 works from artists in northern Canada. The permanent collection was started by the arts centre in 1995. Approximately 80 per cent of the arts centre's collection is held in a climate-controlled storage facility, although the entire collection has been made available for viewing online since December 2016.

In addition to the Yukon Arts Centre's permanent collection, the storage facility also contain works from the Yukon Permanent Art Collection, an art collection owned by the government of Yukon. The storage facility holds approximately 300 works from YPAC not on display in government buildings.

== See also ==
- List of art museums
- Lists of theatres
- List of museums in Yukon
