= GLAAD Media Award for Outstanding Comic Book =

Award presented annually by GLAAD for comic books

- Awarded for: Excellence in depiction of the LGBTQ (lesbian, gay, bisexual, and transgender, and queer) community in comics
- Country: United States
- Presented by: GLAAD
- First award: April 1992; 34 years ago
- Currently held by: Avengers Academy: Marvel's Voices (2026)

The GLAAD Media Award for Outstanding Comic Book is an annual award that honors comic books for excellence in the depiction of LGBTQ (lesbian, gay, bisexual, and transgender, and queer) characters and themes. It is one of several categories of the annual GLAAD Media Awards, presented by GLAAD—an American non-governmental media monitoring organization—at ceremonies in New York City, Los Angeles, and San Francisco between March and June.

The award was introduced in 1992 as a non-competitive category at the 3rd GLAAD Media Awards. The first honoree was the second volume of The Flash, an ongoing comic book series published by DC Comics and written by William Messner-Loebs. No award was given from 1993 through 1995, but one comic has been recognized every year since 1996. Outstanding Comic Book became a competitive category in 1997. While the award initially encompassed all types of comics—such as comic books, comic strips, and graphic novels—GLAAD split the category into two starting with the 33rd ceremony in 2022; Outstanding Comic Book and Outstanding Original Graphic Novel/Anthology.

For a comic to be eligible, it must be targeted at a general audience and be sold nationwide in comic retail stores. Furthermore, it must be published by one of the United States' four mainstream comic book publishers—Dark Horse Comics, DC Comics, Image Comics, or Marvel Comics—or their subsidiaries. A title from another publisher is eligible at GLAAD's discretion if it manages to attain a degree of visibility and impact similar to that of one of the four mainstream publishers.

Comic books selected by GLAAD are evaluated based on four criteria: "Fair, Accurate, and Inclusive Representations" of the LGBT community, "Boldness and Originality" of the project, significant "Impact" on mainstream culture, and "Overall Quality" of the project. GLAAD monitors mainstream media to identify which comic books will be nominated, while also issuing a Call for Entries that encourages media outlets to submit titles for consideration. Comics created by and for an LGBT audience must be submitted in order to be considered for nomination, as GLAAD does not monitor such works for defamation. Winners are determined by a plurality vote by GLAAD staff and board, Shareholders Circle members, (Note: The Shareholders Circle consists of donors who have made a donation of $1,500 or more.) as well as volunteers and allies.

Since its inception, the award has been given to 27 comics. Green Lantern, Young Avengers, Strangers in Paradise, and Star Wars: Doctor Aphra are the only comics to have received the award twice, with only Green Lantern achieving consecutive wins; in 2002 and 2003. Judd Winick is the writer with the most wins, having been nominated four times and winning three; two for Green Lantern. Strangers in Paradise also has the distinction of being the most-nominated comic, having been nominated 7 times. With nine nominations and one win, James Tynion IV has been nominated more often than any other writer. With four nominations, The Authority is the comic that has been nominated the most often without a win; with six nominations, Brian K. Vaughan is the most-nominated writer without a win.

Since the mid-2000s the award has received some criticism for its emphasis on mainstream comics—including its exclusion of non-mainstream comics, webcomics, and manga—as well as failing to recognize comic book artists alongside writers in nominations, though artists were eventually honored alongside writers as of the 34th GLAAD Media Awards.

== Winners and nominees ==
Table key
‡	Indicates the winner

=== 1990s ===
1990s winners and nominees
Award year	Comic	Writer(s)	Publisher	Ref(s).
1992 (3rd)	The Flash ‡	William Messner-Loebs	DC Comics	
1996 (7th)	Maggie Sawyer, Metropolis S.C.U. ‡	Cindy Goff	DC Comics	
1997 (8th)	Death: The Time of Your Life ‡	Neil Gaiman	Vertigo (DC Comics)	
1997 (8th)	Love and Rockets	Hernandez brothers	Fantagraphics Books	
1997 (8th)	Prime	Gerard Jones and Len Strazewski	Marvel Comics	
1997 (8th)	The Spectre	John Ostrander	DC Comics	
1998 (9th)	For Better or For Worse ‡	Lynn Johnston	Andrews McMeel Publishing	
1998 (9th)	The Flash	Mark Waid and Brian Augustyn	DC Comics	
1998 (9th)	The Invisibles	Grant Morrison	DC Comics	
1998 (9th)	Superboy and the Ravers	Karl Kesel	DC Comics	
1999 (10th)	Supergirl ‡	Peter David	DC Comics	
1999 (10th)	The Books of Magic	Neil Gaiman	Vertigo (DC Comics)	
1999 (10th)	Starman	James Robinson	DC Comics	
1999 (10th)	Star Trek: Starfleet Academy	Christian Cooper	Marvel Comics	
1999 (10th)	Young Heroes in Love	Dan Raspler and Dev Madan	DC Comics	

=== 2000s ===
2000s winners and nominees
Award year	Comic	Writer(s)	Publisher	Ref(s).
2000 (11th)	Strangers in Paradise ‡	Terry Moore	Abstract Studios	
2000 (11th)	The Authority	Warren Ellis	WildStorm (DC Comics)	
2000 (11th)	The Girl who Would Be Death	Caitlín R. Kiernan	Vertigo (DC Comics)	
2000 (11th)	Supergirl	Peter David	DC Comics	
2000 (11th)	Top 10	Alan Moore	America's Best Comics / WildStorm (DC Comics)	
2001 (12th)	Pedro and Me ‡	Judd Winick	Henry Holt and Company	
2001 (12th)	The Authority	Warren Ellis and Mark Millar	WildStorm (DC Comics)	
2001 (12th)	Jenny Sparks: The Secret History of the Authority	Mark Millar	WildStorm (DC Comics)	
2001 (12th)	Promethea	Alan Moore	America's Best Comics / WildStorm (DC Comics)	
2001 (12th)	Top 10	Alan Moore	America's Best Comics / WildStorm (DC Comics)	
2002 (13th)	Green Lantern ‡	Judd Winick	DC Comics	
2002 (13th)	Buffy the Vampire Slayer	Various	Dark Horse Comics	
2002 (13th)	Strangers in Paradise	Terry Moore	Abstract Studios	
2002 (13th)	Top 10	Alan Moore	America's Best Comics / WildStorm (DC Comics)	
2002 (13th)	User	Devin K. Grayson	Vertigo (DC Comics)	
2003 (14th)	Green Lantern ‡	Judd Winick	DC Comics	
2003 (14th)	The Authority	Robbie Morrison	WildStorm (DC Comics)	
2003 (14th)	Murder Mysteries	P. Craig Russell	Dark Horse Comics	
2003 (14th)	Strangers in Paradise	Terry Moore	Abstract Studios	
2003 (14th)	X-Statix	Peter Milligan	Marvel Comics	
2004 (15th)	Catwoman ‡	Ed Brubaker	DC Comics	
2004 (15th)	The Authority	Robbie Morrison	WildStorm (DC Comics)	
2004 (15th)	Gotham Central	Greg Rucka and Ed Brubaker	DC Comics	
2004 (15th)	How Loathsome	Ted Naifeh and Tristan Crane	Comics Lit / NBM Publishing	
2004 (15th)	Strangers in Paradise	Terry Moore	Abstract Studios	
2005 (16th)	Luba ‡	Gilbert Hernandez	Fantagraphics Books	
2005 (16th)	Ex Machina	Brian K. Vaughan	WildStorm (DC Comics)	
2005 (16th)	Hard Time	Steve Gerber and Mary Skrenes	DC Comics	
2005 (16th)	My Faith in Frankie	Mike Carey	Vertigo (DC Comics)	
2005 (16th)	Strangers in Paradise	Terry Moore	Abstract Studios	
2006 (17th)	Young Avengers ‡	Allan Heinberg	Marvel Comics	
2006 (17th)	Gotham Central	Greg Rucka and Ed Brubaker	DC Comics	
2006 (17th)	Strangers in Paradise	Terry Moore	Abstract Studios	
2006 (17th)	Top 10: The Forty-Niners	Alan Moore	America's Best Comics / WildStorm (DC Comics)	
2006 (17th)	Y: The Last Man	Brian K. Vaughan	Vertigo (DC Comics)	
2007 (18th)	Fun Home ‡	Alison Bechdel	Houghton Mifflin	
2007 (18th)	52	Geoff Johns, Grant Morrison, Greg Rucka, Mark Waid	DC Comics	
2007 (18th)	American Virgin	Steven T. Seagle	Vertigo (DC Comics)	
2007 (18th)	Manhunter	Marc Andreyko	DC Comics	
2007 (18th)	Y: The Last Man	Brian K. Vaughan	Vertigo (DC Comics)	
2008 (19th)	Strangers in Paradise ‡	Terry Moore	Abstract Studios	
2008 (19th)	American Virgin	Steven T. Seagle	Vertigo (DC Comics)	
2008 (19th)	The Boys	Garth Ennis	Dynamite Entertainment	
2008 (19th)	Midnighter	Garth Ennis, Brian K. Vaughan, Christos Gage, Justin Gray, Jimmy Palmiotti and Keith Giffen	WildStorm (DC Comics)	
2008 (19th)	The Outsiders	Judd Winick, Greg Rucka, and Tony Bedard	DC Comics	
2009 (20th)	Buffy the Vampire Slayer ‡	Drew Goddard, Jeph Loeb and Joss Whedon	Dark Horse Comics	
2009 (20th)	The Alcoholic	Jonathan Ames	Vertigo (DC Comics)	
2009 (20th)	Final Crisis: Revelations	Greg Rucka	DC Comics	
2009 (20th)	Secret Six	Gail Simone	DC Comics	
2009 (20th)	Young Avengers Presents	Ed Brubaker, Brian Reed, Roberto Aguirre-Sacasa, Paul Cornell, Kevin Grevioux and Matt Fraction	Marvel Comics	

=== 2010s ===
2010s winners and nominees
Award year	Comic	Writer(s)	Publisher	Ref(s).
2010 (21st)	Detective Comics ‡	Greg Rucka	DC Comics	
2010 (21st)	Buffy the Vampire Slayer	Jane Espenson, Steven S. DeKnight, Drew Z. Greenberg, Jim Krueger, Doug Petrie, Joss Whedon	Dark Horse Comics	
2010 (21st)	Madame Xanadu	Matt Wagner	Vertigo (DC Comics)	
2010 (21st)	Secret Six	Gail Simone	DC Comics	
2010 (21st)	X-Factor	Peter David	Marvel Comics	
2011 (22nd)	X-Factor ‡	Peter David	Marvel Comics	
2011 (22nd)	Avengers: The Children's Crusade	Allan Heinberg	Marvel Comics	
2011 (22nd)	Buffy the Vampire Slayer	Scott Allie, Brad Meltzer, Joss Whedon	Dark Horse Comics	
2011 (22nd)	Fogtown	Andersen Gabrych	Vertigo (DC Comics)	
2011 (22nd)	Veronica	Dan Parent	Archie Comics	
2012 (23rd)	Batwoman ‡	J. H. Williams III and W. Haden Blackman	DC Comics	
2012 (23rd)	Avengers: The Children's Crusade	Allan Heinberg	Marvel Comics	
2012 (23rd)	Secret Six	Gail Simone	DC Comics	
2012 (23rd)	Veronica Present: Kevin Keller	Dan Parent	Archie Comics	
2012 (23rd)	X-Factor	Peter David	Marvel Comics	
2013 (24th)	Kevin Keller ‡	Dan Parent	Archie Comics	
2013 (24th)	Astonishing X-Men	Marjorie Liu	Marvel Comics	
2013 (24th)	Batwoman	J. H. Williams III and W. Haden Blackman	DC Comics	
2013 (24th)	Buffy the Vampire Slayer	Andrew Chambliss, Scott Allie, Jane Espenson, Drew Z. Greenberg	Dark Horse Comics	
2013 (24th)	Earth 2	James Robinson	DC Comics	
2014 (25th)	Young Avengers ‡	Kieron Gillen	Marvel Comics	
2014 (25th)	Batwoman	J. H. Williams III and W. Haden Blackman	DC Comics	
2014 (25th)	Fearless Defenders	Cullen Bunn	Marvel Comics	
2014 (25th)	Husbands: The Comic	Jane Espenson and Brad Bell	Dark Horse Comics	
2014 (25th)	Life with Archie	Paul Kupperberg	Archie Comics	
2015 (26th)	Rat Queens ‡	Kurtis J. Wiebe	Image Comics	
2015 (26th)	Hawkeye	Matt Fraction	Marvel Comics	
2015 (26th)	Lumberjanes	ND Stevenson and Grace Ellis	Boom! Studios	
2015 (26th)	Memetic	James Tynion IV	Boom! Studios	
2015 (26th)	Saga	Brian K. Vaughan and Fiona Staples	Image Comics	
2016 (27th)	Lumberjanes ‡	ND Stevenson and Grace Ellis	Boom! Studios	
2016 (27th)	Angela: Queen of Hel	Marguerite Bennett	Marvel Comics	
2016 (27th)	Harley Quinn	Amanda Conner and Jimmy Palmiotti	DC Comics	
2016 (27th)	Midnighter	Steve Orlando	DC Comics	
2016 (27th)	The Wicked + The Divine	Kieron Gillen	Image Comics	
2017 (28th)	The Woods ‡	James Tynion IV	Boom! Studios	
2017 (28th)	All-New X-Men	Dennis Hopeless	Marvel Comics	
2017 (28th)	Black Panther	Ta-Nehisi Coates	Marvel Comics	
2017 (28th)	DC Comics Bombshells	Marguerite Bennett	DC Comics	
2017 (28th)	Kim & Kim	Magdalene Visaggio	Black Mask Studios	
2017 (28th)	Love Is Love	Marc Andreyko	IDW Publishing	
2017 (28th)	Lumberjanes	ND Stevenson and Grace Ellis	Boom! Studios	
2017 (28th)	Midnighter / Midnighter and Apollo	Steve Orlando	DC Comics	
2017 (28th)	Patsy Walker, A.K.A Hellcat!	Kate Leth	Marvel Comics	
2017 (28th)	Saga	Brian K. Vaughan and Fiona Staples	Image Comics	
2018 (29th)	Black Panther: World of Wakanda ‡	Roxane Gay, Ta-Nehisi Coates, Yona Harvey, Rembert Browne	Marvel Comics	
2018 (29th)	America	Gabby Rivera	Marvel Comics	
2018 (29th)	The Backstagers	James Tynion IV	Boom! Studios	
2018 (29th)	Batwoman	Marguerite Bennett and James Tynion IV	DC Comics	
2018 (29th)	Deadman: Dark Mansion of Forbidden Love	Sarah Vaughn	DC Comics	
2018 (29th)	Goldie Vance	Hope Larson	Boom! Studios	
2018 (29th)	Iceman	Sina Grace	Marvel Comics	
2018 (29th)	Lumberjanes	ND Stevenson and Grace Ellis	Boom! Studios	
2018 (29th)	Quantum Teens Are Go	Magdalene Visaggio	Black Mask Studios	
2018 (29th)	The Woods	James Tynion IV	Boom! Studios	
2019 (30th)	Exit, Stage Left!: The Snagglepuss Chronicles ‡	Mark Russell	DC Comics	
2019 (30th)	Batwoman	Marguerite Bennett and K. Perkins	DC Comics	
2019 (30th)	Bingo Love	Tee Franklin	Image Comics	
2019 (30th)	Fence	C. S. Pacat	Boom! Studios	
2019 (30th)	Iceman	Sina Grace	Marvel Comics	
2019 (30th)	Lumberjanes: The Infernal Compass	Lilah Sturges	Boom! Studios	
2019 (30th)	Oh S#!t It's Kim & Kim	Magdalene Visaggio	Black Mask Comics	
2019 (30th)	Runaways	Rainbow Rowell	Marvel Comics	
2019 (30th)	Star Wars: Doctor Aphra	Kieron Gillen and Simon Spurrier	Marvel Comics	
2019 (30th)	Strangers in Paradise XXV	Terry Moore	Abstract Studios	

=== 2020s ===
2020s winners and nominees
Award year	Comic	Writer(s)/Creators (Note: Beginning in 2025, award nominations credit the whole creative team, not just the writer(s).)	Publisher	Ref(s).
2020 (31st)	Star Wars: Doctor Aphra ‡	Simon Spurrier	Marvel Comics	
2020 (31st)	The Avant-Guardes	Carly Usdin	Boom! Studios	
2020 (31st)	Bloom	Kevin Panetta	First Second	
2020 (31st)	Crowded	Christopher Sebela	Image Comics	
2020 (31st)	Harley Quinn: Breaking Glass	Mariko Tamaki	DC Comics	
2020 (31st)	Laura Dean Keeps Breaking Up with Me	Mariko Tamaki	First Second	
2020 (31st)	Liebestrasse	Greg Lockard	ComiXology Originals	
2020 (31st)	Lumberjanes	Shannon Watters and Kat Leyh	Boom! Studios	
2020 (31st)	Runaways	Rainbow Rowell	Marvel Comics	
2020 (31st)	The Wicked + The Divine	Kieron Gillen	Image Comics	
2021 (32nd)	Empyre / Lords of Empyre: Emperor Hulkling / Empyre: Aftermath Avengers ‡	Al Ewing, Dan Slott, Chip Zdarsky, Anthony Oliveira	Marvel Comics	
2021 (32nd)	Far Sector	N. K. Jemisin	DC Comics	
2021 (32nd)	Guardians of the Galaxy	Al Ewing	Marvel Comics	
2021 (32nd)	Juliet Takes a Breath	Gabby Rivera	Boom! Studios	
2021 (32nd)	Lois Lane	Greg Rucka	DC Comics	
2021 (32nd)	The Magic Fish	Trung Le Nguyen	Penguin Random House	
2021 (32nd)	Suicide Squad	Tom Taylor	DC Comics	
2021 (32nd)	Wynd	James Tynion IV	Boom! Studios	
2021 (32nd)	X-Factor	Leah Williams	Marvel Comics	
2021 (32nd)	You Brought Me the Ocean	Alex Sánchez	DC Comics	
2022 (33rd)	Crush and Lobo ‡	Mariko Tamaki	DC Comics	
2022 (33rd)	Aquaman: The Becoming	Brandon Thomas	DC Comics	
2022 (33rd)	Barbalien: Red Planet	Tate Brombal and Jeff Lemire	Dark Horse Comics	
2022 (33rd)	The Dreaming: Waking Hours	G. Willow Wilson	DC Comics	
2022 (33rd)	Guardians of the Galaxy	Al Ewing	Marvel Comics	
2022 (33rd)	Harley Quinn: The Animated Series - The Eat. Bang! Kill. Tour	Tee Franklin	DC Comics	
2022 (33rd)	Killer Queens	David M. Booher	Dark Horse Comics	
2022 (33rd)	Star Wars: Doctor Aphra	Alyssa Wong	Marvel Comics	
2022 (33rd)	Superman: Son of Kal-El	Tom Taylor	DC Comics	
2022 (33rd)	Wynd	James Tynion IV	Boom! Studios	
2023 (34th)	Poison Ivy ‡	G. Willow Wilson	DC Comics	
2023 (34th)	I Hate This Place	Kyle Starks	Image Comics	
2023 (34th)	Immortal X-Men	Kieron Gillen	Marvel Comics	
2023 (34th)	New Mutants	Vita Ayala, Danny Lore, Charlie Jane Anders	Marvel Comics	
2023 (34th)	The Nice House on the Lake	James Tynion IV	DC Comics	
2023 (34th)	Sins of the Black Flamingo	Andrew Wheeler	Image Comics	
2023 (34th)	Star Wars: Doctor Aphra	Alyssa Wong	Marvel Comics	
2023 (34th)	Superman: Son of Kal-El	Tom Taylor and Nicole Maines	DC Comics	
2023 (34th)	Tim Drake: Robin	Meghan Fitzmartin	DC Comics	
2023 (34th)	Wynd: The Throne in the Sky	James Tynion IV	Boom! Studios	
2024 (35th)	Star Wars: Doctor Aphra ‡	Alyssa Wong	Marvel Comics	
2024 (35th)	Adventures of Superman: Jon Kent	Tom Taylor	DC Comics	
2024 (35th)	Betsy Braddock: Captain Britain	Tini Howard	Marvel Comics	
2024 (35th)	Hawkgirl	Jadzia Axelrod	DC Comics	
2024 (35th)	Killer Queens 2	David M. Booher	Dark Horse Comics	
2024 (35th)	The Neighbors	Jude Ellison S. Doyle	BOOM! Studios	
2024 (35th)	New Mutants Lethal Legion	Charlie Jane Anders	Marvel Comics	
2024 (35th)	The Oddly Pedestrian Life of Christopher Chaos	Tate Brombal (Note: Based on an idea by James Tynion IV.)	Dark Horse Comics	
2024 (35th)	Poison Ivy	G. Willow Wilson	DC Comics	
2024 (35th)	Tim Drake: Robin	Meghan Fitzmartin	DC Comics	
2025 (36th)	Suicide Squad: Dream Team ‡	Nicole Maines, Eddy Barrows, Eber Ferreira, José Luís, Adriano Di Benedetto, Adriano Lucas, Becca Carey	DC Comics	
2025 (36th)	Alan Scott: The Green Lantern	Tim Sheridan, Cian Tormey, Jordi Tarragona, Raúl Fernandez, John Livesay, Matt Herms, Chris Sotomayor, Lucas Gattoni	DC Comics	
2025 (36th)	Avengers Academy: Marvel's Voices	Anthony Oliveira, Carola Borelli, Bailie Rosenlund, IG Guara, Alba Glez, Elisabetta D'Amico, Pablo Collar, Karen S. Darboe, Carlos Lopez, KJ Díaz, Ian Herring, Frank William, Ariana Maher, Joe Caramagna	Marvel Comics	
2025 (36th)	Captain Marvel	Alyssa Wong, Jan Bazaldua, Ruairí Coleman, Roberto Poggi, Bryan Valenza, Carlos Lopez, Ariana Maher	Marvel Comics	
2025 (36th)	I Heart Skull-Crusher	Josie Campbell, Alessio Zonno, Angel De Santiago, Jim Campbell	BOOM! Studios	
2025 (36th)	The Nice House by the Sea	James Tynion IV, Álvaro Martínez Bueno, Jordie Bellaire, Andworld Design	DC Comics	
2025 (36th)	NYX	Jackson Lanzing, Collin Kelly, Francesco Mortarino, Enid Balám, Elisabetta D'Amico, Michael Shelfer, Raúl Angulo, Joe Sabino	Marvel Comics	
2025 (36th)	The Oddly Pedestrian Life of Christopher Chaos	Tate Brombal, Isaac Goodhart, Soo Lee, Naomi Franq, Miquel Muerto, Patricio Delpeche, Héctor Barros, Aditya Bidikar	Dark Horse Comics	
2025 (36th)	Poison Ivy	G. Willow Wilson, Marcio Takara, Luana Vecchio, Haining, Arif Prianto, Hassan Otsmane-Elhaou	DC Comics	
2025 (36th)	Spectregraph	James Tynion IV, Christian Ward, Aditya Bidikar	DSTLRY	
2026 (37th)	Avengers Academy: Marvel's Voices	Anthony Oliveira, Elsa Sjunneson, Carola Borelli, Bailie Rosenlund, Pablo Collar, Charles Stewart III, Alti Firmansyah, Minkyu Jung, KJ Díaz, Ruth Redmond, Dono Sánchez-Almara, Ariana Maher, Joe Caramagna	Marvel's Infinity Comics	
2026 (37th)	Absolute Green Lantern	Al Ewing, Jahnoy Lindsay, Jason Howard, Riley Rossmo, Sid Kotian, Iñaki Azpiazu, Pressy, Lucas Gattoni	DC Comics	
2026 (37th)	The Department of Truth	James Tynion IV, Martin Simmonds, Letizia Cadonici, Aditya Bidikar, Jordie Bellaire, Dylan Todd	Image Comics	
2026 (37th)	Exceptional X-Men	Eve L. Ewing, Carmen Carnero, Federica Mancin, Nolan Woodard, Travis Lanham	Marvel Comics	
2026 (37th)	Minor Arcana	Jeff Lemire, Patricio Delpeche, Letizia Cadonici, Steve Wands	Boom! Studios	
2026 (37th)	The Oddly Pedestrian Life of Christopher Chaos	Tate Brombal, based on an idea by James Tynion IV, Isaac Goodhart, Priscilla Petraites, Miquel Muerto, Aditya Bidikar	Dark Horse Comics	
2026 (37th)	Poison Ivy	G. Willow Wilson, Marcio Takara, Brian Level, Atagun Ilhan, Mark Buckingham, Arif Prianto, Lee Loughridge, Hassan Otsmane-Elhaou, Tom Napolitano	DC Comics	
2026 (37th)	Runaways	Rainbow Rowell, Elena Casagrande, Roberta Ingranata, Lee Ferguson, Dee Cunniffe, Travis Lanham	Marvel Comics	
2026 (37th)	Secret Six	Nicole Maines, Stephen Segovia, Cian Tormey, Roger Cruz, Rain Beredo, Steve Wands	DC Comics	
2026 (37th)	Wynd: The Power of the Blood	James Tynion IV, Michael Dialynas, Andworld Design, Nancy Mojica, Madison Goyette	Boom! Studios	

== Multiple wins and nominations ==
=== Titles ===
The following titles received two or more Outstanding Comic Book awards:

Wins	Title	Nominations
2	Strangers in Paradise	7
2	Star Wars: Doctor Aphra	5
2	Young Avengers	2
2	Green Lantern	2

The following titles received four or more Outstanding Comic Book nominations:

Nominations	Title
7	Strangers in Paradise
5	Batwoman
5	Buffy the Vampire Slayer
5	Lumberjanes
5	Star Wars: Doctor Aphra
4	X-Factor
4	The Authority

=== Writers ===
The following writers received two or more Outstanding Comic Book awards:

Wins	Title	Nominations
3	Judd Winick	4
2	Terry Moore	8
2	Peter David	5

The following writers received four or more Outstanding Comic Book nominations:

Nominations	Title
9	James Tynion IV
8	Terry Moore
7	Greg Rucka
6	Brian K. Vaughan
5	Peter David
5	Kieron Gillen
5	Alan Moore
4	Marguerite Bennett
4	Ed Brubaker
4	Grace Ellis
4	ND Stevenson
4	Tom Taylor
4	Judd Winick

=== Publishers ===
The following publishers received two or more Outstanding Comic Book awards:

Wins	Title	Nominations
12	DC Comics (Note: Totals include nominations for the DC Comics imprints Vertigo and WildStorm.)	78
7	Marvel Comics	37
2	Boom! Studios	18
2	Abstract Studios	8

The following publishers received four or more Outstanding Comic Book nominations:

Nominations	Title
78	DC Comics
37	Marvel Comics
18	Boom! Studios
11	Dark Horse Comics
9	Image Comics
8	Abstract Studios
4	Archie Comics

== Criticism ==
Rich Thigpen, a member of the advisory board of Prism Comics, has described a debate existing regarding GLAAD's award for Outstanding Comic Book and whether the comics the organization nominates "were deserving because of their LGBT content or because of the press coverage they generated". Thigpen stated that, given GLAAD's "very mission statement", it is expected that most Outstanding Comic Book nominees will be mainstream works that have "made the biggest media impact", and that he personally sees nothing wrong with this.

Andrew Wheeler of ComicsAlliance has also criticed the focus on mainstream comics, as it results in the award having a "somewhat narrow focus". He points out how, despite Alison Bechdel's Fun Home winning the Outstanding Comic Book award in 2007, Are You My Mother? wasn't even nominated during the 2013 ceremony. Wheeler also criticized the exclusion of webcomics, arguing that the most "progressive and inclusive LGBT content in comics today" is to be found in digital comics. The omission of manga has also been criticized, with Yuricon founder Erica Friedman stating that she has often written to GLAAD about including manga in this category.

The category was also criticized for recognizing only the writers of individual comics, but not the artists. Wheeler has described this as "frustrating" and argued that it "undermines the award's credibility". Writing for Paste, Steve Foxe described GLAAD's unacknowledgement of artists as "painful". GLAAD's failure to recognize artists was also criticized by comics journalist Oliver Sava, frequent Marvel Comics artist Mark Brooks, and Rich Johnston of Bleeding Cool, among others. GLAAD began crediting entire creative teams in 2025.
