= 25th GLAAD Media Awards =

Annual US media awards ceremony

The 25th GLAAD Media Awards was the 2014 annual presentation of the GLAAD Media Awards, presented by GLAAD honoring the 2013 season. The awards honored films, television shows, musicians and works of journalism that fairly and accurately represent the LGBT community and issues relevant to the community. The 25th Annual GLAAD Media Awards honored 93 nominees in 20 English-language categories and 37 nominees in nine Spanish-language categories.

The nominees were announced on January 30, 2014. The awards were presented in two separate ceremonies; at The Beverly Hilton in Beverly Hills, California on April 12, 2014, and at the Waldorf Astoria in New York City on May 3, 2014.

== Winners and nominees ==
The winners are indicated in bold.

=== English-language categories ===
Award	Nominees
Outstanding Film - Wide Release	**Philomena**; Blue Is the Warmest Colour; Dallas Buyers Club; Kill Your Darlings; The Mortal Instruments: City of Bones
Outstanding Film – Limited Release	**Concussion**; Geography Club; Out in the Dark; Reaching for the Moon; Yossi
Outstanding Drama Series	**The Fosters**; Grey's Anatomy; Orphan Black; Pretty Little Liars; Shameless
Outstanding Comedy Series	**Orange Is the New Black**; Brooklyn Nine-Nine; Glee; Modern Family; Please Like Me
Outstanding Individual Episode (in a series without a regular LGBT character)	**"Snow Angels"** of **Elementary**; "Bride and Prejudice" of The Soul Man; "LARP and the Real Girl" of Supernatural; "Secret Lives" of Drop Dead Diva; "There's the Door" of Necessary Roughness
Outstanding TV Movie or Mini-Series	**Behind the Candelabra**; In the Flesh
Outstanding Documentary	(tie) **Bridegroom**; (tie) **Call Me Kuchu**; God Loves Uganda; The New Black; Valentine Road
Outstanding Reality Program	**Big Freedia: Queen of Bounce**; Cyndi Lauper: Still So Unusual; Dream School; Project Runway; Small Town Security
Outstanding Talk Show Episode	**"First Openly Gay NBA Player Jason Collins and his Family"** of **Oprah's Next Chapter**; "Are Gay Parents Different?" of The Ricki Lake Show; "Fred Rosser" of The Ellen DeGeneres Show; "Laverne Cox" of Totally Biased with W. Kamau Bell; "Modern Family Values" of Raising McCain
Outstanding Daily Drama	**Days of Our Lives**
Outstanding TV Journalism - News Magazine	**"Transgender at 11: Listening to Jazz"** of **20/20**; "Chris to Kristin: A Navy Seal's Secret" of Anderson Cooper 360°; "India's Third Gender" of The Stream; "The Rebounder: The Kenneth Faried Story" of E:60; "The Welcoming Movement" of To the Contrary
Outstanding TV Journalism Segment	**"Gay Rights at Work"** of **MSNBC Live**; "Portman Reverses Position on Gay Marriage" of Starting Point; "Civil Rights Icon Supports Gay Marriage" of CNN Newsroom; "Pride & Prejudice" of Melissa Harris-Perry; "Scouts Dishonor" of The Last Word with Lawrence O'Donnell; "Wild Blue Yonder: Scott Hines" of The Rachel Maddow Show
Outstanding Newspaper Article	**"LGBTQ in the Capital" (series) by Melissa Griffiths, Juneau Empire**; "Boy or Girl? Gender a New Challenge for Schools" by Martha Irvine, Associated Press; "Gay Ex-mayor Who Fled U.S. Awaits Immigration Change" by Jeremy Roebuck, San Antonio Express-News; "Poor Black and Hispanic Men Are the Face of H.I.V." by Donald G. McNeil, Jr., The New York Times; "Why Bisexuals Stay in the Closet" by Emily Alpert, Los Angeles Times
Outstanding Magazine Article	**"The Hidden War Against Gay Teens" by Alex Morris, Rolling Stone**; "Owning the Middle by Kate Fagan", ESPN The Magazine; "The Perfect Wife" by Ariel Levy, The New Yorker; "What's Wrong With Exxon?" by Antonia Juhasz, The Advocate; "Why Gay and Lesbian Couples Pay More" by Carolyn M. Brown, Black Enterprise
Outstanding Magazine – Overall Coverage	**The New Yorker**; The Advocate; ESPN The Magazine; People; Time
Outstanding Digital Journalism Article	**"Sex, Lies and HIV: When What You Don’t Tell Your Partner is a Crime" by Sergio Hernandez, Buzzfeed.com / ProPublica.org**; "How Fallon Fox Became the First Known Transgender Athlete in MMA" by Loretta Hunt, SportsIllustrated.CNN.com; "How One Lawyer Turned the Idea of Marriage Equality into Reality" by Chris Geidner, Buzzfeed.com; "Prime Timers: Spotlight on LGBT Seniors" (series), Advocate.com; "Repression and Gay Rights in Russia" by Sean Guillory, TheNation.com
Outstanding Digital Journalism - Multimedia	**"We Are Here: LGBTI in Uganda" by Sunnivie Brydum, D. David Robinson, Advocate.com**; "Bisexuals Get Their Turn in the White House" by Alyona Minkovski, Live.HuffingtonPost.com; "Coming Out Kicking" by Cyd Zeigler, Outsports.com; "Remixing the Trans and Hip Hop Conversation" by Marc Lamont Hill, Live.HuffingtonPost.com; "To Get Married, They Left Ohio" by Julie Zimmerman on behalf of the Cincinnati Enquirer Editorial Board, Cincinnati.Com
Outstanding Blog	**The New Civil Rights Movement**; Autostraddle; Elixher; Holy Bullies and Headless Monsters; TransGriot
Outstanding Music Artist	**Tegan and Sara, Heartthrob**; Elton John, The Diving Board; Goldfrapp, Tales of Us; Lady Gaga, Artpop; Vampire Weekend, Modern Vampires of the City
Outstanding Comic Book	**Young Avengers, by Kieron Gillen, Marvel Comics**; Batwoman, by W. Haden Blackman, J.H. Williams III, Marc Andreyko, DC Comics; Fearless Defenders, by Cullen Bunn, Marvel Comics; Husbands: The Comic, by Jane Espenson, Brad Bell, Dark Horse Comics; Life with Archie, by Paul Kupperberg, Archie Comics

=== Spanish-language categories ===
Award	Nominees
Outstanding Novela	**Amores Verdaderos**
**Outstanding Daytime Talk Show Episode**	**"Una pareja gay celebrará el Día del Padre luego de luchar por sus derechos"** of **¡Despierta América!, Univision**; "Entregando a mi nieta" of Caso Cerrado, Telemundo; "Exclusivas Declaraciones" of Al Rojo Vivo, Telemundo; "Matrimonios del mismo sexo: Entrevista con Daniel Zavala y Yohandel Ruiz" of Un Nuevo Día, Telemundo; "Rachel" of Casos de Familia, Univision
**Outstanding Talk Show Interview**	(tie) **"Debate por la igualdad" of Al Punto, Univision**; (tie) **"Decisión Histórica" of Sin Límites con Elizabeth Espinosa, CNN en Español**; "Homosexuales en la delegación de los EE.UU." of Realidades en Contexto, CNN en Español; "Karina Hermosillo habló de sus motivos en Nuestra Belleza Latina" of Sábado Gigante, Univision; "El Matrimonio, Asunto de Dos" of Cala, CNN en Español
**Outstanding TV Journalism - News Magazine**	**"Rompiendo Estereotipos" Aquí y Ahora, Univision**; "Locutor Policía" Aquí y Ahora, Univision; "Lucha por la Igualdad" Panorama Mundial, CNN en Español; "El Pastor Homofóbico" Primer Impacto, Univision
**Outstanding TV Journalism Segment**	**"Decisión Histórica" Noticiero Telemundo, Telemundo**; "El Caso Zamudio" Nuestro Mundo, CNN en Español; "La comunidad gay hispana se siente perseguida en los EEUU" Noticiero Univision, Univision; "Mayoría de hispanos aceptan uniones homosexuales" Noticiero NTN, NTN; "Si nos dejan: adopciones entre parejas gays" Noticias MundoFox, MundoFox
**Outstanding Local TV Journalism**	**"Natalia: rompiendo barreras" Noticiero Telemundo Arizona, KTAZ**; "Hasta que la corte nos una" Noticias Telemundo 51, WSCV; "Mi niño es niña: familia en Florida cuenta su experiencia criando a una hija transgénero" Noticias 23 Univision, WLTV; "Reportaje Especial: Derechos Homosexuales" Noticiero Telemundo Washington, WZDC; "Undocuqueers" Noticias Univision 34, KMEX
**Outstanding Newspaper Article**	**"Desiguales por imperativo legal"** by **Jose Ángel Gonzalo García de León, Diario Las Américas**; "Critican homophobia de prelate" by Juan Matossian, El Diario La Prensa; "Un nuevo panorama migratorio para miles de parejas gay" by Eloy Bleifuss Prados, Diario Hoy; "Su esposa la hizo residente" by Virginia Gaglianone, La Opinión; "Transgéneros: discriminados tres veces" by Belhú Sanabria, La Raza
**Outstanding Digital Journalism Article**	**"Richard Blanco: el poeta latino y gay que conquisto a Barack Obama"** by **Daniel Basteiro, voces.huffingtonpost.com**; "Joven birracial y lesbiana es pionera en concurso de belleza de EE.UU.", CNNenEspañol.cnn.com; "Vive en California y ya se prepara para casarse" by Maritza Díaz Alcaide, PrimeraHora.com
**Outstanding Digital Journalism - Multimedia**	**"Eric y Juan, un matrimonio feliz a pesar de todo" by Fernando Mexia, EFE.com**; "Karina Hermosillo, de 'Nuestra Belleza Latina', es lesbiana y no tolera la discriminación", PeopleenEspañol.com; "Karina Hermosillo de 'Nuestra Belleza Latina' quiere ser la primera reina gay, voces.huffingtonpost.com; "Primera pareja gay hispana gana residencia permanente", HolaCiudad.com

=== Honorary awards ===
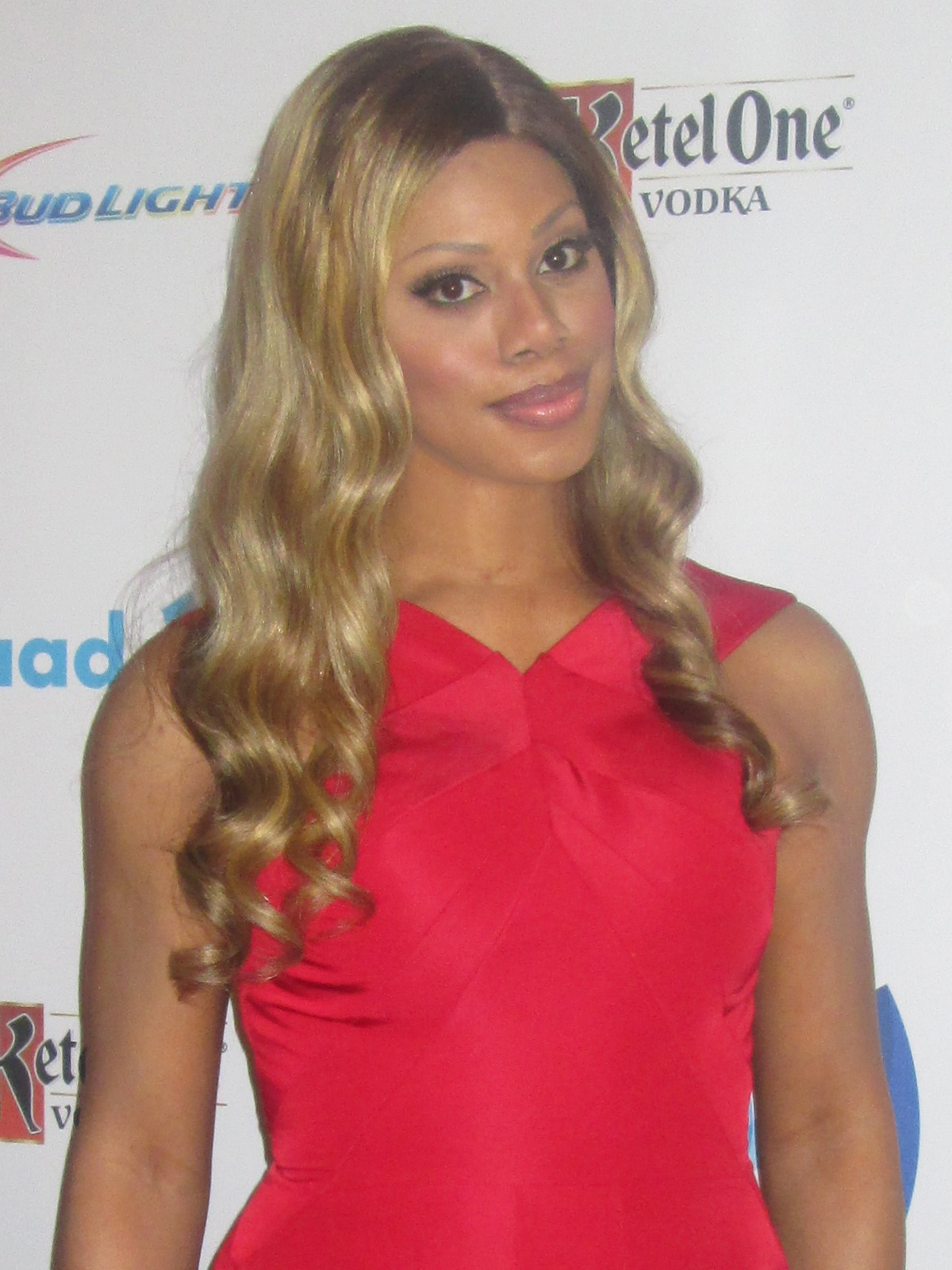
Stephen F. Kolzak Award recipient, Laverne Cox at the 25th GLAAD Media Awards, Los Angeles, April 12, 2014

- Pioneer Award to Norman Lear
- Vanguard Award to Jennifer Lopez (The Fosters executive producer)
- Stephen F. Kolzak Award to Laverne Cox (Orange Is the New Black actress)
- International advocate for change award to Manny de Guerre
- Vito Russo Award to George Takei
