= Husbands: The Comic =

- Art by Ron Chan

Publication information
- Publisher: Dark Horse Comics
- Schedule: Weekly
- Format: Limited series
- Genre: Fantasy
- Publication date: October 24, 2012 – November 28, 2012
- No. of issues: 6

Creative team
- Created by: Brad Bell; Jane Espenson
- Written by: Brad Bell; Jane Espenson
- Penciller(s): Ron Chan; Natalie Nourigat; M. S. Corley; Benjamin Dewey; Tania del Rio
- Letterer: Nate Piekos

Collected editions
- Hardcover: ISBN 978-1-61655-130-8

Husbands: The Comic is a digital comic book series published by Dark Horse Comics. The series serves as a canonical continuation of the acclaimed newlywed sitcom Husbands, following the events of its third season, and is written by the television series' creators Brad Bell and Jane Espenson. The storyline follows Cheeks and Brady after they receive a mysterious wedding present, which sets in motion a chain of events, thematic to the rabbit hole metaphor. It was ultimately collected in a hardcover edition, released on March 27, 2013.

== Development ==
An announcement at the 2012 Dragon Con revealed that an exclusive digital comic book series, based on the newlywed sitcom Husbands, would be released on October 24, 2012, published by Dark Horse Comics, featuring art by Ron Chan, Natalie Nourigat, M. S. Corley, Benjamin Dewey and Tania del Rio. In early 2013, a hardcover edition was released, featuring an introduction by Neil Gaiman.

Jane Espenson explains that "[Husbands] is set in a marriage-equalized world, so it's already got a hint of an alternate-universe thing going on". Reiterating that sentiment, she goes on to say, "the comic books are going to totally dive into a whole [alternate-universe] premise. So we're going from genre-curious to full-on genre!" Brad Bell elaborated, "I wanted to make sure we translated Husbands into something worthy of the comic realm. It's not some sort of trans-media marketing ploy. I think fans of comics and fans of Husbands will enjoy it". Bell obtained inspiration from the feature film Scott Pilgrim vs. the World, saying that he "thought it was an incredible interpretation of comics on the screen". This developed into an affinity for the comic book writing style.

Espenson and Bell felt that an allegorical examination of the story would lend itself to find aspects of realism in its metaphors, which would give them a framing device to connect the alternate universes, to which Bell continued, "would be a way to explore a bunch of different universes with a bunch of different stories while still connecting it". Espenson determined that, even though "each comic is a discrete adventure", there is "always one or two threads that tie into the larger mythology". In conclusion, she equated its overall paradigm with the type of serialized storytelling employed by the reimagined Battlestar Galactica series.

== Publication ==
=== Issues ===
Title	Issue #	Release date
"Drawn In"	1	October 24, 2012
Writers: Brad Bell & Jane Espenson		Penciller: Ron Chan
Cheeks, Brady Kelly and Haley are launched into an alternate universe, where they have no memories of the past. Supervillain Chet Deckfin, depicted as Cheeks, poses a threat to superhero Light Fantastic, depicted as Brady, in the search for hexagonal diamonds.
"The Well-Intentioned-but-Oblivious Prince and the Justifiably Belligerent Peasant OR Equally Ever After"	2	October 31, 2012
Writers: Brad Bell & Jane Espenson		Penciller: Natalie Nourigat
Through a vortex of time, they are spun farther out of reality, into The Middle Ages. Prince Arden, depicted as Brady, kidnaps Cheekston, depicted as Cheeks. He does this in order to make Cheekston his consort. However, when Cheekston declines, he is imprisoned in the royal castle, forced to plan his escape.
"A Case of Assumption"	3	November 7, 2012
Writers: Jane Espenson & Brad Bell		Penciller: M.S. Corley
Detective Winston Chess and Colonel Bradon, depicted as Cheeks and Brady respectively, venture into a situation involving the murder of a landlord and a missing gem. They investigate the mystery, encountering obstacles to defeat as a means to solve the puzzle.
"Nocte Machinas"	4	November 14, 2012
Writers: Brad Bell & Jane Espenson		Penciller: Benjamin Dewey
In a post-apocalyptic universe where a perpetual war called Nocte Machinas continues on, Chipper Twee, depicted as Cheeks, and Blaze Hull, depicted as Brady, have fled away from the strife. Faced with an opportunity to stop the warfare, they carry out the fortuitous assignment in hope that it will succeed.
"Arch Nemesis"	5	November 21, 2012
Writers: Brad Bell & Jane Espenson		Penciller: Tania del Rio
Upon hearing a rumor that his boyfriend Chick, depicted as Cheeks, was unfaithful, Brick, depicted as Brady, confronts him about it. Their friend, depicted as Haley, reasons that the gossip is unfounded. With an appetite for revenge, Chick and Brick join to plot against the one who spread the lie.
"Agent Secrets"	6	November 28, 2012
Writer: Brad Bell		Penciller: Ron Chan
In St. Petersburg, secret agent Austin Chase, depicted as Cheeks, and secret agent Brink, depicted as Brady, searches for two Egyptian royal rings, rumored to endow ancient powers to anyone who wears them. Serpentina, depicted as Haley, kidnaps secret agent Chase as a way to get the rings for herself.

== Accolades ==
Year	Award	Result	Reference
2013	The Geekie Award for Best Writing	Nominated	
2013	The Geekie Award for Most Original Concept	Nominated	
2014	GLAAD Media Award for Outstanding Comic Book	Nominated	
