= Buckle Up =

Buckle Up may refer to:

- Wearing a seat belt by inserting the end into the buckle
- Buckle Up Music Festival three-day country music festival in Cincinnati
- Buckle Up (graphic novel), 2024 graphic novel by Lawrence Lindell
- "Buckle Up", song by Debbie Harry from Rockbird
- "Buckle Up", song by Pearl Jam from Gigaton (album)
- Buckle Up, album by Adam Buxton.
