= Blackward =

2023 graphic novel by Lawrence Lindell

- Date: September 26, 2023
- Publisher: Drawn & Quarterly

Creative team
- Creator: Lawrence Lindell
- ISBN: 9781770466784

Blackward is a 2023 graphic novel by Lawrence Lindell. It follows four Black queer friends who start their own zine festival. It was positively reviewed and was nominated for various awards, including an Eisner Award and GLAAD Media Award.

== Plot ==
Lika, Amor, Tony, and Lala are four Black queer friends. After being banned from their local community centre due to an anti-LGBTQ protest, they resolve to create a zine festival called Blackward (combining the words Black and awkward).

== Development ==
The book was based off a webcomic called The Section created earlier by Lindell. In an interview with Kirkus Reviews, he noted Tee Franklin's Bingo Love as an inspiration for creating his own "Black queer story".

== Reception ==
Blackward was given a starred review by Kirkus Reviews, which dubbed the book "A paean to the radical joy of being every part of yourself". It was also reviewed by Publishers Weekly and Broken Frontier.

=== Accolades ===
Year	Award/Honor	Result	Ref.
2022	Dwayne McDuffie Award for Diversity in Comics	Shortlisted	
2024	Lambda Literary Award for LGBTQ+ Comics	Shortlisted	
2024	GLAAD Media Award for Outstanding Graphic Novel/Anthology	Shortlisted	
2024	Eisner Award for Best Publication for Teens	Shortlisted	
2024	Jacqueline Woodson Award	Shortlisted	

== See also ==
- Buckle Up - another graphic novel by Lindell
