= Bingo Love =

2018 graphic novel by Tee Franklin

- Date: February 14, 2018
- Page count: 88 pages
- Publisher: Image Comics

Creative team
- Writer: Tee Franklin
- Artists: Jenn St-Onge
- Letterer: Cardinal Rae
- Colorist: Joy San
- Editor: Erica Schultz
- ISBN: 978-1-5343-0750-6

Bingo Love is a 2018 lesbian romance graphic novel written by Tee Franklin and illustrated by Jenn St-Onge and Joy San. It follows two women in their 60s who rekindle their teenage love for each other.

== Plot ==
Hazel and Mari, two teenage Black girls in the 1960s, meet at a church bingo hall in 1963 and fall in love. They secretly become girlfriends, but are exposed and forced apart by their families. Decades later, when they are grandmothers in heterosexual marriages, the two run into each in another bingo hall and discover they still have feelings for each other.

== Development ==
Franklin was inspired to create the work after seeing a commercial about heart health featuring two older Black women.

The book was originally funded on Kickstarter, raising close to $60,000. It was also chosen for Prism Comics' 2017 Queer Press Grant.

An expanded edition of the original book titled Jackpot Edition containing extra content from guest artists, as well as a sequel titled Bingo Love Vol. 2: Dear Diary focusing on Mari’s granddaughter going through her grandmother’s journals, was announced in 2018. Jackpot Edition released in November 2018.

== Reception ==
Bingo Love was given a starred review by the School Library Journal. It was also reviewed by Publishers Weekly.

The Advocate included in a list of the Best LGBTQ Graphic Novels of 2018, stating who the book showed both how homophobia "can disrupt lives" and how it "cannot stop the hands of fate or prevent true love from finding fruition". It also emphasized the book's depiction of "dark skin, black hair, full figures [and] visible stretch marks" for the main leads. Autostraddle named it one of the Best LGBT Books of 2018, describing it as "ungodly adorable".

According to Comic Book RoundUp, the book has a review average of 8.6 out 10 across 18 critical reviews.

Cartoonist Lawrence Lindell cited Bingo Love as an inspiration for creating his own "Black queer story", which became the 2023 graphic novel Blackward.

=== Accolades ===
Year	Award/Honor	Result	Ref.
2019	GLAAD Media Award for Outstanding Comic Book	Shortlisted	
2018	Virginia Library Association Graphic Novel Diversity Award - Adult	Won	
2018	NPR's Best Books	Included	

== See also ==
- The Ojja-Wojja - graphic novel also illustrated by Jenn St-Onge
