= The Oddly Pedestrian Life of Christopher Chaos =

Comic book series

- Cover of #1, art by Nick Robles

Publication information
- Publisher: Tiny Onion; Dark Horse Comics
- Schedule: Monthly
- Genre: Supernatural; Horror; Mystery; Science fiction
- Publication date: 2023 – present
- Number of issues: 20 (including one special)

Creative team
- Writer(s): James Tynion IV; Tate Brombal
- Artist(s): Isaac Goodhart
- Letterer(s): Aditya Bidikar
- Colorist(s): Miquel Muerto
- Editor(s): Greg Lockard (Tiny Onion); Daniel Chabon (Dark Horse)

The Oddly Pedestrian Life of Christopher Chaos is a supernatural horror mystery comic book series based on an idea by James Tynion IV and written by Tate Brombal. It was originally published through Tynion's own substack Tiny Onion in 2022, and was later re-published by Dark Horse Comics beginning on June 28, 2023. The series focuses on the titular character, a teenage mad scientist who teams up with unlikely allies to investigate the murder of his classmate and crush.

The series has drawn acclaim from fans and critics for its writing, art, and LGBT+ representation, and has received an Eisner Award nomination and two GLAAD Media Award nominations.

== Background ==
On February 11, 2022, Tynion debuted Christopher Chaos and horror anthology series True Weird on his Tiny Onion substack page. The series was created during a creative workshop ran by Scott Snyder and was based on stories Tynion had written in college. He had met Brombal while working on the first story arc of House of Slaughter and, feeling a connection towards his writing style, approached him to collaborate on fleshing out the world and story of what would ultimately become Christopher Chaos. When asked to describe the series, Tynion explained "it's a coming-of-age story about extraordinary teenagers, getting wrapped up in a larger-than-life mystery. But like all of my work, we're not going to shy away from violence, language, or the jagged edges of young life. I think the key comparison point that I'd say is Invincible. And like I said before, this isn't quite a superhero comic, but it IS the closest thing to a superhero comic I'm working on, or am likely to work on for a good long while." Brombal explained that Tynion came to him with the initial pitch for the series and some key foundational elements for the world he had in mind which Brombal used to create a series "bible" that they both used to construct the outline for the first story arc. Brombal also stated that he worked in close collaboration with artist Isaac Goodhart on the series' look and layout, with Goodhard noting that Christopher's distinctive design and unique color scheme and silhouette was chosen to contrast with the "pedestrian" elements of the world and give him a "fish out of water" feel.

Dark Horse Comics would later pick up the series and published the first issue on June 28, 2023. The series concluded with #15, which released on, January 15, 2025.

A 48-page one-shot Halloween special issue was released on October 2, 2024. The special was split into five short stories written by Tynion, Brombal, Goodhart, Morgan Breem, and Soo Lee.

The second story arc was announced on February 19, 2025, with Brombal explaining "witnessing Christopher's story resonate with so many people has been a highlight of my career, and it feels so good to be back". The new four issue miniseries, subtitled Children of the Night, premiered on June 18, 2025. Each issue of the miniseries also included Monsters in Love backup stories written by Bradley Clayton, Chloe Brailsford, Marie Enger, and K Czap. Of these, Tynion stated "with Monsters In Love, we're excited to bring Christopher Chaos' favorite comic book to life. These stories are an excuse to give my favorite story prompt I've ever given creators – Romance stories starring your favorite horror monsters. I can't wait for everyone to see what we have in store for you."

== Plot ==
Christopher Chaos is a socially awkward teenager who attends Westwood High School, where his eccentric personality and overactive brain make him somewhat of an outcast. He was found alone as a baby and was taken in by his adoptive mother Annie, a nurse. One afternoon, he sees his crush, Hayden Kennedy, sneak into the woods near the school and decides to follow him, only for Hayden to transform into a werewolf and be gunned down by a group of masked figures wearing all-white. Traumatised, Christopher returns home and confesses what he saw to a pigeon, which is then hit by a garbage truck. Christopher's then builds a device which brings the bird back to life. Elsewhere in New Briar City, junior detective Jesse Tombs investigates a series of bloody murders, but is dismissed by fellow officers. She is interrupted by the Helwing Corps, who claim to have jurisdiction over the crime scene. As news of Hayden's disappearance spreads, Christopher attempts to unsuccessfully resurrect more animals, and is confronted by Hayden's best friend Jordi, a vampire who masquerades as the vigilante Dracula Boy, who believes he knows the truth. Their fight is paused when they see a member of the Helwing Corps, and Christopher states that they are responsible for killing Hayden. Micah, a low-ranked member of the Corps, meets with their leader Father Andreas, who forcibly transforms him into a vampire so that his hunters can train. During detention, Christopher, Jordi, and Hayden's girlfriend Viveka are attacked by the Corps, but are saved by a mysterious man. He teleports them away as Tombs, who had unsuccessfully questioned the group earlier, is told by her partner Rocco to turn a blind eye for her own safety. She unwittingly draws the police to the abandoned church where the group and their rescuer, Adam Frankenstein, are hiding. Elsewhere, the Corps call on the Cardinal, one of their demonic chief enforcers, to kill Frankenstein. Adam uses a magical organ to bury the church, and takes the group to the Monster Underground, a hidden city beneath New Briar that is now abandoned after the Helwing Corps discovered it and slaughtered the inhabitants. Viveka reveals that she has been texting Hayden's phone as a way to cope with his death, unaware that it has led the Corps right to them.

With the assistance of spectral cats created by Viveka's necklace, Jordi and Adam hold off the Cardinal and Helwing Corps clerics until Christopher can successfully repair the church and turn it into a weapon to kill them. Rocco tells Tombs that he and the rest of the Police work for an unseen group, and she quits in response to the corruption. Rocco is subsequently murdered by the Cardinal. Elsewhere, a member of the Undying Order chastises Father Andreas for the unsanctioned slaying of Hayden and for allowing Christopher and his friends to cause so much damage. Flashbacks detail Adam's creation by Victor Frankenstein. After inadvertently killing his master's lover Henry, Adam flees and is taken in by a young girl named Agatha and her family, while the Helwing Corps offer their services to Victor to hunt down his creation.

Six months after the battle in the Monster Underground, Christopher, Jordi, and Viveka, who have formed the Monster Club, gather at Hayden's grave where his mother Sarah chastises Jordi and blames him for her son's death. At Christopher's birthday party, the Monster Club resolve to expand their membership, while a desperate Sarah approaches her bloodthirsty former werewolf pack seeking support. The pack tasks the Volkov twins with tracking down Hayden's killer. After failing to find answers from his mother, Adam, or through research, Christopher begins electrocuting himself in order to push the limits of his body and mind so that he can find out his true origins. After being discovered by his mother, who destroys his machinery, Christopher falls into a depression. Ylvaria, pack leader and mother of Luka and Sasha Volkov, chastises them for their lack of insight, and orders them to spy on the Monster Club, whom she believes are a threat. A disgraced Father Andreas orders the Cardinal to kill Adam, disobeying the Undying Order.

Viveka warily allows the Volkov twins into the Monster Club, but tensions quickly rise into a fight. Christopher stops it using an anti-gravity ray, and suggests returning to the Monster Underground so the group can bond. Ylvaria tells Sarah that she must kill Hayden's murderer in order to re-join the pack. Cardinal follows Adam and the two prepare for a showdown. The Volkovs are awed by the Monster Underground but still quietly prepare to kill the Monster Club. Adam questions why Cardinal does the bidding of the Helwing Corps when he is also a monster, but they are interrupted by Sarah, who believes Adam is responsible for Hayden's death. The three begin to fight, and Adam convinces Sarah that Ylvaria lied to her, and she reverts to her human form but is killed by the Cardinal, who tells Adam that death always follows him. Jordi and Viveka save the Volkov twins from dying, and the group stumble upon Clement, a witch boy who lives within an enchanted mural recounting the history of his family. Clement shares his story with the group, discussing his childhood in the Underground with his grandfather, his obsessive work on chronicling his family through the mural, his love of a vampire named Damon, and his death at the hands of the Helwing Corps when he refused to evacuate in order to protect the mural. He then asks the group what they would be willing to die for. Father Andreas visits Annie and offers to help her cure Christopher of his monstrous brain with an experimental drug. Having seen Adam fighting alongside the Cardinal against Sarah, Christopher demands answers. Adam reveals that he and a group of likeminded humans and monsters, the Horrorist Society, discovered that a mysterious energy known as aether causes people to become monsters, and that be believes Christopher to be a be composed entirely of it. Christopher tells Adam that he is going to build a new world for monsters to be safe.

== Critical reception ==
Reviewing the first issue, I-J Wheaton from Comic Book Herald praised Brombal's writing, noting the "great dialogue, character beats, and unexpected plot progression", Christopher's authentic, witty, and well-constructed characterisation as a queer teenager wanting to be normal, the "lovable", "inventive" art style and panel work, and the twists and turns of the story, but highlighted an overall lack of focus and cohesion due to "not feeling anchored in any particular genre, therefore struggling to subvert or challenge the boundaries of horror, supernatural, or teenage coming-of-age stories in a meaningful way." They concluded by stating "all in all, this is a bombastic first issue that demonstrates tremendous potential for the series going forward, even if the premise feels a little unpolished."

=== Awards and nominations ===
Award nominations for The Oddly Pedestrian Life of Christopher Chaos
Year	Organization	Award	Result	Ref.
2024	GLAAD Media Awards	Outstanding Comic Book	Nominated	
2025	GLAAD Media Awards	Outstanding Comic Book	Nominated	
2025	Eisner Awards	Eisner Award for Best Writer	Nominated	

== Collected editions ==
Title	Collected material	Pages	Publication date	ISBN	Ref.
The Oddly Pedestrian Life of Christopher Chaos Vol. 1	The Oddly Pedestrian Life of Christopher Chaos #1-6	224	May 21, 2024	978-1506736723	
The Oddly Pedestrian Life of Christopher Chaos Vol. 2	The Oddly Pedestrian Life of Christopher Chaos #9-15, Halloween Special	256	June 3, 2025	978-1506737812	
The Oddly Pedestrian Life of Christopher Chaos: Library Edition	The Oddly Pedestrian Life of Christopher Chaos #1-15, Halloween Special	360	March 10, 2025	978-1506741628	
