= The Replacement (Buffy the Vampire Slayer) =

- Buffy the Vampire Slayer episode
- Episode no.: Season 5 Episode 3
- Directed by: James A. Contner
- Written by: Jane Espenson
- Production code: 5ABB03
- Original air date: October 10, 2000

Guest appearances
- Kristine Sutherland as Joyce Summers; Michael Bailey Smith as Toth; Kelly Donovan as Xander Double; Cathy Cohen as Building Manager; David Reivers as Foreman; Fritz Greve as Construction Worker

Episode chronology
← Previous "Real Me"	Next → "Out of My Mind"
- Buffy the Vampire Slayer season 5

"The Replacement" is episode three of season five of the television show Buffy the Vampire Slayer. The episode aired on October 10, 2000, on The WB.

A demon's wand "splits" Xander into two Xanders, one of whom is confident, receives a promotion at work, and buys an apartment to share with Anya, and the other of whom feels anxious, jealous, and like a loser.

== Plot ==
The gang starts looking for an apartment for Xander so he can move out of his parents' house, though he worries that he may not be able to afford it, upsetting Anya. Giles receives a visit from a demon searching for the Slayer. He later identifies the demon as Toth, the only survivor of the Tothric Clan. The gang checks out the city dump in search of the demon and finds Spike scavenging. The demon hits Xander with light from a rod and knocks him to the ground. He gets to his feet and walks off with the rest of the gang, while there is another Xander still lying in a pile of trash.

The next morning, one Xander awakens at the city dump and then discovers his double upon returning to his house. One of the Xanders is very ambitious and gets a promotion at work, signs a lease on a very nice apartment, and sets up a date with Anya. The hesitant Xander watches as all this happens and finally confronts his double. After the two Xanders see each other, the confident Xander talks to Buffy and she makes this a matter of Slayer business. Soaked by the rain, weak Xander goes to Willow and tries to explain that this double is taking over his life; he then suddenly realizes that his double is going after Anya.

Anya and the confident Xander discuss their future and Anya expresses her fears about not living forever. Giles discovers that the rod Toth used on Xander split him into two Xanders – one with weak qualities and the other with strong qualities. Toth intended to use the rod to split Buffy into two beings. In addition, as the two beings are real and technically one being, the death of one will kill them both. The weak Xander crashes the date between strong Xander and Anya. Both think that the other is a demon and the scared Xander pulls out a handgun he got from Anya's apartment.

Buffy tells the doubles the truth about their situation and tries to convince them not to kill each other. When Toth appears at the apartment, Buffy and Riley fight and kill him. The two Xanders eventually begin to get along, and Willow ends the spell on the Xanders, making them one again. While moving Xander into his new apartment, Xander and Riley talk. Riley confesses that, despite how much he loves Buffy, he realizes that she does not feel the same.

== Production ==
Nicholas Brendon played both Xanders, except in scenes where the two interacted, during which Brendon's twin brother, Kelly Donovan, played confident-Xander. Donovan's name was given in TV Guide, but not in the opening credits. At the time, Brendon wrote on the message boards at his official website, NickBrendon.com,

"Truth be told, I played both characters. It was very challenging and rewarding and I must've done an OK job if you couldn't tell it was me. ... I had a blast working with Kelly and he really deserves kudos for his work. He was never promised on-screen dialogue but they did end up using some and I think he did a stand-up job. In fact there was even one point where Kelly, [Brendon's wife] Tressa [DiFiglia] and I had to rewind and freeze the tape to decipher who was who, (standing side by side, Kelly as "Cool Xander" did a stellar job of imitating my signature blinky eyes.)"

Scriptwriter Jane Espenson became famous for writing many of the comedy episodes of Buffy. Saying she is "a fan of all the original Star Trek episodes, but we were very conscious of the double Kirk transporter accident scenario," she discussed the episode in an interview with the BBC, saying,

"I had actually pitched a double Xander episode in one of my first seasons because I thought, 'We've got an actor with an identical twin, how can we not use this, this is such an opportunity. We can do the shots without having to do the cheesy green screen thing, we can use both actors.' It just seemed like a natural to me so I was really happy when I got the opportunity to do that. An interesting nugget about that episode was it was originally called 'Real Me' (the eventual title of episode two) and we decided to change it because we didn't want to give away the fact that both Xanders were real. They were both Xander. ... When you think about this character, we've seen so many different aspects of him over the years — the braveness, the trueness, the stalwartness — he's really the truest friend you could have. At the same time, we've given him a callowness and a shallowness and a lack of self confidence. To realise that Joss has created a character that's rich enough that there's enough for two real people there, that's kind of cool."

== Themes ==
Noel Murray of The A.V. Club writes, "Early in Buffy's Season Five, a theme of sorts is emerging, having to do with how the characters perceive themselves, how they're actually perceived, and a truth buried so deep that it's practically undetectable. And though Dawn barely appears in this week's episodes... she embodies the season's developing theme, given that she's been accepted by the other characters as as [sic] a [sic] entrenched part of their collective world, even though we know that she doesn't belong."

Mark Oshiro says similarly that Xander craves affirmation and that "it's really hard to cope with the idea that you're legitimately inadequate, even if that's just how you perceive it."

Roger Pocock argues that Giles, Xander and Spike seemed not to have much purpose among the Scoobies recently, but now Giles is

given a new purpose in life, already restored to the position of Buffy's Watcher, and starting a new business venture with the magic shop, which also provides the gang with a place to get together... This week it's time to fix the problem of Xander. There's only so long a character can be the butt of all the jokes before it starts to wear a little thin, and the viewers' enjoyment of the comedy can shift over time towards dislike or dissatisfaction with a character who just doesn't learn, or grow as a person. At some point, Xander needed to achieve something, and this is his moment.

He adds that Spike is now also separated from the other main characters and has become the butt of jokes. "This week he starts going a bit weird, with his pretend Buffy mannequin." He has become "a loser who scavenges at the tip and indulges in lonely fantasies," after being a frightening fighter for so long, and will also need a makeover.

== Cultural references ==
The website Women at Warp compares it with the Star Trek: The Next Generation episode "Second Chances." "What happens when a character gets split into two versions of himself? In TNG, you end up with one Riker that's a focused career man, and one that's been pining away for his long lost love with Troi. In Buffy, one Xander gets all the 'good qualities' (charm, confidence, etc.) and one constantly looks disheveled. Spoiler alert: The two Rikers and two Xanders aren't all that different from each other after all!"

== Critical reception ==
Vox, ranking it at #41 of all 144 episodes on their "Worst to Best" list, writes, "He spent most of season four camped out in his parents' damp and grimy basement, drifting from dead-end job to dead-end job and getting increasingly bitter about the bright futures his friends seemed to have. ... It's a fun episode that puts his character arc back on track and leads us to the solid, dependable Xander who will save the day at the end of season six."

Paste Magazine, in a similar list, ranked it at #102 and wrote, "For much of the series, Xander has been the comic relief or, as he so eloquently puts it two episodes prior, the butt monkey, but Season Five marks the emergence of the new, improved and more mature Xander Harris: still funny, but clearly moving into adulthood. Much influenced by the Star Trek: TOS episode 'The Enemy Within,' 'The Replacement' shows that it takes all sides of a personality to make a whole and that, Anya's disturbing end-of-episode threesome suggestion aside, you shouldn't always try to separate the wheat from the chaff."

Noel Murray writes that "the episode is hilarious, with sharp comic business in just about every scene." Roger Pocock says, "Although [the successful Xander] isn't really anyone's enemy (and that's a very clever misdirection and twist), it makes loser Xander the audience perspective character. We like him and we don't like the other one. Whilst the other characters might see nothing wrong with successful Xander, for the viewers he's boring and a bit creepy. So at least the point is made for the viewers that both sides of Xander are needed for him to be the person we actually want to watch, and this works well as a reaffirmation of the qualities that earn Xander his place in the series."

Myles McNutt says that it "captures a lot of the best of the series: there's some broad comedy in there, as one would expect when the hapless part of Xander's personality is isolated, but the existential experience of watching (as we learn later) the embodiment of your strongest qualities live your life better than you had imagined was really well-developed by Espenson and Brendon. ... While 'The Zeppo' re-evaluated Xander's position within the group, 'The Replacement' is much more focused on Xander's identity, his own 'Doppelgangland' of sorts which is similarly effective in terms of revealing that which is often hidden within the show's characters."
