= Wynd (comic) =

Comic book by James Tynion IV and Michael Dialynas

Publication information
- Publisher: Boom! Box/Boom! Studios
- Genre: Fantasy
- Publication date: June 2020 - April 2026
- No. of issues: 23

Creative team
- Written by: James Tynion IV
- Artist: Michael Dialynas
- Letterer: Aditya Bidikar

Wynd is a fantasy comic book series written James Tynion IV and illustrated by Michael Dialynas. It consists of three limited series published by Boom! Box from 2020 to 2026, which have been collected into five graphic novel volumes. It was nominated for an Eisner Award as well as multiple GLAAD Media Awards.

== Plot ==
Wynd, a young boy whose magical ancestry gives him pointy ears, lives in Pipetown, where those with magical heritage are killed. As his ears grow and his magic become harder to conceal, he is forced to confront who he really is.

== Release ==
The series was originally announced in January 2020 as a graphic novel trilogy. In May 2020, it was revealed that the series would instead be published as single issues starting the following month, with the complete graphic novels being released a later date. It consists of three limited series: Wynd (#1-10), The Throne in the Sky (#11-15), and The Power of Blood (#16-23), with the last issue being published in April 2026.

Each series has been collected into a graphic novel, with the first series being divided into The Flight of the Prince (#1-5) and The Secret of the Wings (#6-10), and The Power of Blood being divided into a self-titled volume (#16-19) and The Way of the World (#20-23).

In 2025, it was announced that the series would be rereleased as a vertical scroll webcomic on Webtoon, which launched in January 2026.

Tynion first came up with the idea for the idea for the series at the age of 16.

== Reception ==
According to Comic Book Roundup, a review aggregator website, the series has an average rating of 8.3 out of 10 across 63 reviews for the first 16 issues.

Vishal Gullapalli of AIPT Comics, reviewing Wynd #1, praised the worldbuilding and Dialnyas' art, but criticized the decision to release the series in as individual issues instead of full graphic novels, suggesting readers wait until the series was compiled into full books before starting it. Samantha Puc of Comic Book Resources positively commented on how the themes of xenophobia and marginalization in the series were supported the diverse cast and praised Bidikar's lettering.

Eric Alex Cline of AIPT Comics, in a review for the completed Flight of the Prince, praised the development of the four main characters and the use of magic as a stand-in for real-life oppression, noting how although not explicitly labeled the character of Wynd is shown to be attracted to men at various points of the story. Tim Rooney of Comic Book Resources compared the first graphic novel tonally and in terms of ambition to Bone, concluding that it was "heartwarming and optimistic despite its heavy themes and emotional story."

=== Accolades ===
Awards and honors
Year	Award/Honor	Result	Ref.
2021	GLAAD Media Award for Outstanding Comic Book	Shortlisted	
2022	GLAAD Media Award for Outstanding Comic Book	Shortlisted	
2022	Eisner Award for Best Publication for Teens	Shortlisted	
2023	GLAAD Media Award for Outstanding Comic Book (Wynd: The Throne in the Sky)	Shortlisted	
2026	GLAAD Media Award for Outstanding Comic Book (Wynd: The Power of the Blood)	Shortlisted	
2026	Ringo Award for Best Kids Comic or Graphic Novel – Ages 12 and Up (Wynd: The Power of the Blood)	Shortlisted	
