= Monty (TV series) =

- Genre: Sitcom
- Created by: Marc Lawrence
- Written by: Jane Espenson; Katie Ford; Marc D. Lawrence; Frank Lombardi; Carolyn Lucas; Dana Reston
- Directed by: Robby Benson; James Burrows; Matthew Diamond; Gene Reynolds
- Starring: Henry Winkler; David Schwimmer
- Composer: Dan Foliart
- Country of origin: United States
- Original language: English
- No. of seasons: 1
- No. of episodes: 13 (7 unaired)

Production
- Executive producers: Marc D. Lawrence; Henry Winkler
- Producer: Ana Krewson
- Running time: 30 minutes
- Production companies: Fair Dinkum Productions; Reserve Room Productions; Touchstone Television

Original release
- Network: Fox
- Release: January 11 – February 15, 1994

Monty is an American sitcom that aired on Fox from January 11 to February 15, 1994. The series starred Henry Winkler as Monty Richardson, a loud, obnoxious conservative TV commentator. Richardson had also written a best-selling book titled I'm Right. I'm Right. I'm Right. Shut Up. The series also starred Tom McGowan as his executive producer and David Schwimmer as his left-leaning son. Monty hoped to capitalize on the same family dynamic that made the television show All in the Family a success in the 1970s. However, the show was canceled after six episodes.

== Reception ==
The series was carried on NBC's development slate in 1993 before Fox began airing the show in 1994. Variety stated that while the show was clichéd, it had funny moments and that lead actor Henry Winkler did "just fine".

== Cast ==
- Henry Winkler as Monty Richardson
- David Schwimmer as Greg Richardson
- Kate Burton as Fran Richardson
- Joyce Guy as Rita Simon
- China Kantner as Geena Campbell
- David Krumholtz as David Richardson
- Tom McGowan as Clifford Walker

== Episodes ==
No.	Title	Directed by	Written by	Original release date
1	"Here Comes the Son"	James Burrows	Marc Lawrence	January 11, 1994
2	"The Son Also Rises"	Robby Benson	Frank Lombardi & Dana Reston	January 18, 1994
3	"East Side Story"	Henry Winkler	Bruce Helford	January 25, 1994
4	"Two Cold Feet"	Unknown	Unknown	February 1, 1994
5	"Baby Talk"	Unknown	Unknown	February 8, 1994
6	"The Principal's Interest"	Gene Reynolds	Jane Espenson	February 15, 1994
7	"Wild, Wild Willy and His O.K. Corral aka There Goes the Glaad Award"	N/A	N/A	Unaired
8	"My Dad Could Beat Up Your Dad"	N/A	N/A	Unaired
9	"Eggheads"	N/A	N/A	Unaired
10	"The Brother of the Bride"	N/A	N/A	Unaired
11	"Those Who Can't Teach, Teach Gym At David's School"	N/A	N/A	Unaired
12	"Death in Plainview"	Pat Fischer-Doak	Marc Lawrence	Unaired
13	"Pilot"	N/A	N/A	Unaired
