= Buckle Up (graphic novel) =

2024 graphic novel by Lawrence Lindell

- Date: August 27, 2024
- Publisher: Random House Graphic

Creative team
- Creator: Lawrence Lindell
- ISBN: 978-0-593-47979-7

Buckle Up is a 2024 graphic novel by Lawrence Lindell. It follow Lonnie, a middle schooler who attempts to bond with his divorced father during car rides to and from school.

== Plot ==
When Lonnie's parents divorce, he ends up living with his mother and sister. Unwilling to grow apart from his father and being taunted by peers over his parents' split, Lonnie arranges to have his dad drive him to and pick him up from his middle school. Their talks during their car rides start tense, but the father-son duo gradually open up to each other, discussing topics such as racism, family, and sexuality, with Lonnie coming out as bisexual in response to a homophobic comment from his father.

== Reception ==
Kirkus Reviews gave a positive review, saying the book's formatting, "with its clean backgrounds and bright colors, effectively conveys the variety of emotions the family members experience," and that "time spent with various configurations of the family riding in cars together nicely captures their dynamics."

Publishers Weekly described the art as "simple yet expressive", and felt that Lonnie and his father's "triumphs and missteps are equal parts awkward and tender." The book was also reviewed by School Library Journal.

The book was included on the Graphic Novels & Comics Round Table's Best Graphic Novels for Children for 2024.

== See also ==
- Blackward - another graphic novel by Lindell
