= Husbands (TV series) =

- Genre: Sitcom
- Created by: Brad Bell; Jane Espenson
- Written by: Brad Bell; Jane Espenson
- Directed by: Jeff Greenstein (17 episodes); Eli Gonda (3 episodes)
- Starring: Brad Bell; Sean Hemeon
- Composers: Stephen Main; James Bladon; Ross Flournoy
- Country of origin: United States
- Original language: English
- No. of seasons: 3
- No. of episodes: 20

Production
- Executive producers: Jane Espenson; Brad Bell; Jeff Greenstein
- Producer: M. Elizabeth Hughes
- Production locations: Los Angeles, California
- Cinematography: Benjamin Kantor
- Running time: 3–10 minutes
- Production company: Ottoman Empire

Original release
- Network: YouTube
- Release: September 13, 2011 – October 3, 2013

Husbands is an American sitcom web series written and created by Brad Bell and Jane Espenson, which premiered September 13, 2011, via super syndication on streaming platforms such as Blip, YouTube and Roku. The series stars Brad Bell and Sean Hemeon as a newly married couple. Billed as the world's first marriage equality comedy, Husbands is a modern look on the classic premise of the newlywed sitcom.

The second season premiered August 15, 2012. After producing two seasons independently, it was announced that CW Seed had made a six-episode order for a third season of Husbands, which aired on August 15, 2013. No forthcoming seasons have since been announced.

== Synopsis ==
After six weeks of dating, an actor (Bell) and a baseball player (Hemeon) travel to Las Vegas in celebration of a federal amendment for marriage equality, only to wind up drunk-married to each other. Fearing that a public divorce would be devastating to the cause, and their careers, the two decide to stay married.

== Production ==
=== Conception ===
The series originated from a script written by Brad Bell, entitled SO L.A., the story of a gay man in his twenties, his female best friend, and the single life in Los Angeles. Jane Espenson read the script and declared it "brilliant, and funny, and hilarious". She urged Bell to move forward with the project and search for a more immediate angle. Bell countered by offering the premise of young same-sex newlyweds, giving the concept a "fresher take" and turning it into a platform for his signature comedic style of societal observations. Bell then wrote the initial draft of what became Husbands overnight.

=== Development history ===
The official CW Seed poster for season three

Husbands debuted on September 13, 2011. The show was hosted by Streamin' Garage for its worldwide series premiere.

To fund season two, the creators launched a Kickstarter platform for individual pledges, the primary goal being $50,000. On April 18, 2012, the campaign reached $60,000, 120% of their original goal. In an interview with Heat, Bell added that they were "turning everything up, the quality, the controversy, the comedy, the heart, the sex -- everything". On August 13, 2012, season two premiered at the Paley Center for Media in Beverly Hills, California, making it the first online series to be hosted by Paley Center. The second season consisted of three eight-minute acts.

On March 27, 2013, Variety reported that Husbands would continue production in partnership with CW Seed. Accordingly, CW Seed ordered six episodes for the third season, consisting of two story arcs. It aired on the network on August 15, 2013, and debuted a special screening at the Paley Center for Media on August 14, 2013. However, with the move to CW Seed, the new content on its website was geographically locked to air in the United States. Brad Bell explained, "25% of our audience is international, and we love those fans ... I am working on how we are going to get it to them". The season was released internationally on October 17, 2013.

Jane Espenson confirmed in August 2014 that Husbands would return for a fourth season with a "new schedule".

== Cast and characters ==
On July 12, 2011, the principal cast members were announced to be Brad Bell, Sean Hemeon and Alessandra Torresani. Hemeon was the last actor to audition for the part of Brady, and eventually got the role. The name of his character Brady Kelly is a deliberate word play on the name of show creator Brad Bell. During the live world premiere of season one, Bell announced that the first two guest appearances would be Michael Buckley and Nathan Fillion.

At the 2012 San Diego Comic-Con, Brad Bell and Jane Espenson revealed that Joss Whedon would appear in all episodes of the second season as Wes, on which Whedon commented that it was his "biggest acting role yet". Further casting for season two included Jon Cryer, Mekhi Phifer, Felicia Day, Amber Benson, Emma Caulfield, Tricia Helfer, Sasha Roiz, Magda Apanowicz, Aasha Davis, Dichen Lachman, and Clare Grant.

On July 5, 2013, The Hollywood Reporter announced Amy Acker as the first guest star of the third season. During the 2013 San Diego Comic-Con, the casting sheet for season three was revealed to include Seth Green, Michael Hogan, Beth Grant and Deb Theaker. A trailer later confirmed that Hogan and Grant would be playing Brady's parents Scott and Gillian, respectively. Shortly after, Janina Gavankar and Elaine Carroll were added to the list.

== Themes ==
In an article for The Huffington Post, creator Brad Bell said that a concept he had in mind while creating Husbands was to retain a framing device of conventional sitcom tropes, but "instead of avoiding the cliché, we can somehow reinvent the wheel". He elaborated on the show's philosophy:

Husbands, both as a sitcom and as a comic book, embraces clichés, stereotypes and tropes to make a point: Most old ideas are only as meaningless or as negative as their context. Few of these notions are intrinsically detrimental, as the judgements we attach to them exist only in our minds. See, it's the ratio of "expected" to "unexpected" that gives us dimensionality and makes each one of us unique. Like a snowflake! Then again, snowflakes aren't all that unique. (Science lied to you.)

In a piece, while examining the show in comparison to Mad About You, Den of Geek's Laura Akers reasons that "this comparison sells the online comedy short". Akers added that the "[Mad About You characters] never had to face the kind of scrutiny that Brady and Cheeks do nor did the validity of heterosexual marriage as a construct rest on their shoulders". Akers concluded that "for all its courage in taking on some of these issues, it's never heavy-handed or melodramatic. Instead, it's whimsical, witty, and highly entertaining ... And because we recognize, gay or straight, what love really looks like, the show's appeal is universal".

Bell proceeded to say that Husbands "lives in the newest medium for entertainment because, along with proving that American audiences are more progressive than broadcast networks might think, the show also demonstrates that viewers are happy to consume entertainment in a new medium, which is actually an old medium reinvented, which is actually the entire conceptual frame of Husbands as a sitcom". Themes of 'gender identity versus sexual identity' served as subtext for the second season, and according to Bell, "recur throughout the entire series".

== Episodes ==
=== Season 1 (2011) ===
No. overall	No. in season	Title	Directed by	Written by	Original release date
1	1	"Waking Up In Vegas"	Jeff Greenstein	Brad Bell & Jane Espenson	September 13, 2011
Cheeks (Brad Bell) and his until-recently ballplayer husband Brady (Sean Hemeon) give a press conference about their new marriage. Flashbacks reveal them hung-over in Vegas after celebrating a new marriage equality law and reacting in shock to the realization that they are married.
2	2	"We Can't Be Married"	Jeff Greenstein	Brad Bell & Jane Espenson	September 13, 2011
Brady panics when thinking of the impact the impulsive wedding will have on the public eye's view of them. Cheeks has already come to terms with the situation at hand, despite both becoming aware of the leaked news about them on the Internet.
3	3	"Being Britney!"	Jeff Greenstein	Brad Bell & Jane Espenson	September 13, 2011
The Action Sports 1 anchor (Nathan Fillion) comments on the drunken Vegas-wedding, showing real footage of the previous night, accompanied by commentary from Michael Buckley. Cheeks and Brady have a cathartic moment about the possibility of remaining married.
4	4	"A Decent Proposal"	Jeff Greenstein	Brad Bell & Jane Espenson	September 20, 2011
Brady and Cheeks try to discuss what to do next. Cheeks is hesitant over the whole situation, but it ends with Brady expressing his love in a sober moment, finally giving Cheeks a decent proposal.
5	5	"IDEHTW"	Jeff Greenstein	Brad Bell & Jane Espenson	September 20, 2011
The two newlyweds are in the middle of packing for Los Angeles. Haley (Alessandra Torresani), Cheeks' best friend, gives a sudden entrance into the hotel room and starts raving on about last night's wedding escapade.
6	6	"Haley, The Life Coach"	Jeff Greenstein	Brad Bell & Jane Espenson	September 20, 2011
Whilst in a limousine, Haley conveys her surprise to what has happened with Cheeks and Brady. She also makes it apparent to them that they didn't review the whole situation. Afterwards, she takes the initiative to be their life coach.
7	7	"Normal People"	Jeff Greenstein	Brad Bell & Jane Espenson	October 4, 2011
Brady tentatively decides to move in with Cheeks. Haley, Cheeks and Brady have a conversation about what married couples would do in a usual context. Brady's decision soon blends into a discussion about what else to do with their future lives as a married couple.
8	8	"This Together Thing"	Jeff Greenstein	Brad Bell & Jane Espenson	October 4, 2011
Cheeks, by a symbolic gesture, makes room for Brady in his home, and tells him that it's possible to do this if they both contribute to the marriage. They establish a fundamental leap in their relationship by creating a bond of trust together.
9	9	"Instant Love"	Jeff Greenstein	Brad Bell & Jane Espenson	October 4, 2011
Haley and Cheeks surprise Brady with a new addition to the family, Jack Russell Mix the dog. Brady feels the impulsivity of purchasing a pet should have been between Cheeks and him, not Cheeks and Haley, and is forced into a patriarchal stance, expressing his wish for the dog to be returned to the store.
10	10	"Return of the Zebra"	Jeff Greenstein	Brad Bell & Jane Espenson	October 18, 2011
Cheeks and Brady argue about having equal rights to compromise when in disagreements. Brady assumes a misplaced sense of perception about having a special warrant in the relationship, implying that Cheeks' femininity attributes a non-authoritative personality. The problem is solved, yet Brady isn't sure if that's enough.
11	11	"Winky Face"	Jeff Greenstein	Brad Bell & Jane Espenson	October 18, 2011
Brady has a problem with Cheeks' lack of announcements about their marriage. As a result, Cheeks alerts several social networking sites to spread the news. The end follows the newlywed couple crawling into bed, leaving the audience with a cliffhanger; Brady asking Cheeks, "What's your real name?"

=== Season 2 (2012) ===
No. overall	No. in season	Title	Directed by	Written by	Original release date
12	1	"Appropriate Is Not the Word"	Jeff Greenstein	Brad Bell & Jane Espenson	August 15, 2012
At the time of their three week anniversary, Cheeks and Brady have settled into a new home. That morning, Cheeks photographs himself and Brady kissing and posts the picture online. Wes (Joss Whedon), Brady's agent, calls to inform him about the possibility that a morality clause, which Brady signed for his organization, might be broken because of the resulted media outrage regarding the photo. Accordingly, Brady asks Cheeks if he could cease his publicly flamboyant behavior, so that Brady's career wouldn't be jeopardized. Cheeks expresses his dissent with the idea, but hesitantly agrees, yet secretively implies an introspective insincerity.
13	2	"The Straightening"	Jeff Greenstein	Brad Bell & Jane Espenson	August 29, 2012
The night before the national interview, Cheeks prepares a less flamboyant wardrobe for the occasion. In bed, Cheeks teases Brady with innuendo to prove a point. The next day, Cheeks tells Haley about his plan to sabotage the interview. Haley suggests that in order for Brady's career to be sustained, Cheeks should go ahead with Brady's charade to change public opinion. Cheeks is convinced, and confident that it will work. Meanwhile, Brady's colleague, Mark (Mekhi Phifer), is in disagreement with Brady's arrangement, and persuades Brady to revoke it. The dichotomized couple sits down with Vic Del Rey (Jon Cryer) for the live broadcast.
14	3	"A Better Movie of What We're Like"	Jeff Greenstein	Brad Bell & Jane Espenson	September 12, 2012
Cheeks and Brady realize that their personalities were reversed in an erroneous attempt to achieve public approval. Cheeks ends his part of the session. Continuing the interview, Brady brings about the story of how he and Cheeks met. Cheeks, who had never been told the story, eavesdrops on the conversation. They ultimately settle their dispute and reconcile with a kiss. Later, Wes calls to notify Brady of an endorsement deal obtained as a result of Cheeks' previously uploaded picture, which rapidly circulated on the Internet. In celebration of the support assuring that Brady's career is unharmed, Cheeks and Brady share an intimate night.

=== Season 3 (2013) ===
No. overall	No. in season	Title	Directed by	Written by	Original release date
15	1	"I Do Over - Part 1"	Jeff Greenstein	Brad Bell & Jane Espenson	August 15, 2013
While having a private ceremony with friends and family, Cheeks and Brady are about to re-declare their vows to each other. But in light of Brady's previously unraveled past, Cheeks runs off into the house. Brady follows. A flashback shows what secrets were revealed in the first place.
16	2	"I Do Over - Part 2"	Jeff Greenstein	Brad Bell & Jane Espenson	August 22, 2013
Cheeks encounters Brady's ex-fiancée Claudia (Amy Acker), who unexpectedly shows up. Meanwhile, as the ceremony gets closer, Brady's father (Michael Hogan) speaks with him, and ends up giving his consent to Brady living his life however he wants.
17	3	"I Do Over - Part 3"	Jeff Greenstein	Brad Bell & Jane Espenson	August 29, 2013
Out of the flashback, Cheeks and Brady look back on the day's events. They reason that maybe getting married was a mistake. Brady's mother (Beth Grant) and father, intent on saving their marriage, put them in handcuffs. Now stuck together, they decide to stay together. After some convincing, Haley marries them.
18	4	"I Dream of Cleaning - Part 1"	Eli Gonda	Brad Bell & Jane Espenson	September 19, 2013
Brady comes home from work and finds out that dinner is already done. Cheeks insists that he did all of it. When Brady steps out of the room, it is made known that Cheeks secretly persuaded his neighbor Parker (Elaine Carroll) to cook the food, as well as do other chores in the house.
19	5	"I Dream of Cleaning - Part 2"	Eli Gonda	Brad Bell & Jane Espenson	September 26, 2013
Cheeks is cleaning the bathtub when his neighbor Kajal (Janina Gavankar) enters. They exchange gossip, and go on to have a chat about how the ideal lifestyle is not staying at home while Brady works. However, Cheeks then explains that he does it because it's what Brady deserves.
20	6	"I Dream of Cleaning - Part 3"	Eli Gonda	Brad Bell & Jane Espenson	October 3, 2013
Later, when Brady comes home again, Cheeks tries to seduce him. Distracted by the sound of a faulty garbage disposal, Cheeks tries to repair it, but to no avail. Brady reveals that he had a neighbor's wife do his own errands. Cheeks does the same. They finally end the charade, but appreciate the thoughts behind it.

== In other media ==
=== Comic books ===
At the 2012 Dragon Con, it was announced that an exclusive six-issue Husbands digital comic book series would be released, starting October 24, 2012, with Dark Horse Comics, featuring art by Ron Chan and various other artists. Jane Espenson elaborated on the key concept, saying that "the comic books are going to totally dive into a whole [alternate-universe] premise. So we're going from genre-curious to full-on genre". The storyline follows the events that take place after Cheeks and Brady receive a mysterious wedding present, which sets in motion a chain of events, thematic to the rabbit hole metaphor. Brad Bell, who wrote the script with Espenson, says "I wanted to make sure we translated Husbands into something worthy of the comic realm. It's not some sort of trans-media marketing ploy. I think fans of comics and fans of Husbands will enjoy it". The series was ultimately collected in a hardcover edition, released March 27, 2013.

== Reception ==
=== Critical reaction ===
Husbands was among the first new media series to receive critical acclaim from multiple mainstream media outlets, including high praise from The New Yorker, which marked the publication's first inclusion of a new media series. Commending the series' writing, TVLine remarked that "rapid fire wit and comedic cleverness dominate every moment". Maureen Ryan of The Huffington Post noted the intricacy beneath Husbands' sitcom sensibility, saying, "Husbands doesn't side-step the complexity of the situation…it deftly uses those problems as comedic fodder". Lifestyle magazine Out echoed this sentiment by calling Husbands "crackling cultural commentary with the quick-step energy of classic screwball comedy" while Time observed that, though Husbands "starts from a high-satire topic about the public debate over gay marriage" it ultimately "ends up telling a very sweet story about two guys trying to have a relationship simply as people". In addition to being named the Best Web Comedy of 2011 by TV.com and "currently the best web series running" by A.V. Club's Emily VanDerWerff, Husbands was also called "One of the smartest, most unique, and powerful pieces of entertainment this year" by The Insider.

As for the show's role in the entertainment industry, political blog ThinkProgress defined Husbands as "pioneering" and "an important example of how television distributed online fits into a larger pop-culture ecosystem". Adding to that idea, Complex praised the show for being "consistently hilarious…while blazing digital and social trails".

Before guest starring in season two, Joss Whedon expressed his admiration for the series, and described it as "full of the kind of whip-smart remarks you wish you'd written yourself". Additional media coverage has included Wired, The Chicago Tribune, The Philadelphia Inquirer, The Atlantic, The Advocate, The Austin Chronicle, The Salt Lake Tribune, The Los Angeles Times, LA Weekly, Backstage, The Backlot, AfterEllen, as well as the media monitoring organization GLAAD.

=== Accolades ===
Year	Award	Category	Recipients and nominees	Result	Ref.
2012	Indie Soap Awards	Best Actor (Comedy)	Brad Bell	Nominated	
2012	Indie Soap Awards	Best Writing (Comedy)	Jane Espenson and Brad Bell	Nominated	
2012	Telly Awards	Online Video	Scriptacular Productions	Won	
2012	Webby Awards	Best Writing	Scriptacular Productions	Nominated	
2013	International Academy of Web Television	Best Comedy Web Series	Husbands	Nominated	
2013	International Academy of Web Television	Best Male Performance (Comedy)	Sean Hemeon	Nominated	
2013	International Academy of Web Television	Best Female Performance (Comedy)	Alessandra Torresani	Nominated	
2013	International Academy of Web Television	Best Writing (Comedy)	Brad Bell and Jane Espenson	Nominated	
2013	International Academy of Web Television	Best Directing (Comedy)	Jeff Greenstein	Nominated	
2013	Streamy Awards	Best Male Performance: Comedy	Brad Bell	Nominated	
2013	Streamy Awards	Best Female Performance: Comedy	Alessandra Torresani	Nominated	
2013	Streamy Awards	Best Guest Appearance	Joss Whedon	Nominated	
2013	Streamy Awards	Best Cinematography	Benjamin Kantor	Nominated	
2013	Streamy Awards	Series of the Year	Husbands	Nominated	
2013	Indie Soap Awards	Best Web Series (Comedy)	Husbands	Nominated	
2013	Indie Soap Awards	Best Actor (Comedy)	Brad Bell	Won	
2013	Indie Soap Awards	Best Actor (Comedy)	Sean Hemeon	Nominated	
2013	Indie Soap Awards	Best Supporting Actor (Comedy)	Joss Whedon	Nominated	
2013	Indie Soap Awards	Best Writing (Comedy)	Brad Bell and Jane Espenson	Won	
2013	Indie Soap Awards	Best Directing (Comedy)	Jeff Greenstein	Nominated	
2013	Indie Soap Awards	Best Ensemble (Comedy)	Husbands	Nominated	
2013	Indie Soap Awards	Best Guest Appearance (Comedy)	Jon Cryer	Nominated	
2013	Indie Soap Awards	Best Editing	Nathaniel Atcheson	Nominated	
2014	Writers Guild of America Awards	Short Form New Media – Original	Brad Bell and Jane Espenson for the episodes "I Do Over Part 1–2"	Nominated	
2014	International Academy of Web Television	Best Editing	Nathaniel Atcheson	Nominated	
2014	International Academy of Web Television	Best Comedy Series	Husbands	Won	
2014	International Academy of Web Television	Best Directing (Comedy)	Jeff Greenstein, Eli Gonda	Nominated	
2014	International Academy of Web Television	Best Female Performance in a Comedy	Amy Acker	Nominated	
2014	International Academy of Web Television	Best Male Performance in a Comedy	Brad Bell	Won	
2014	International Academy of Web Television	Best Male Performance in a Comedy	Sean Hemeon	Nominated	
2014	International Academy of Web Television	Best Writing (Comedy)	Brad Bell and Jane Espenson	Won	
2014	International Academy of Web Television	Best Ensemble Performance	Brad Bell, Sean Hemeon	Won	
2014	International Academy of Web Television	Best Supplemental Content	Husbands	Nominated	
2014	International Academy of Web Television	Best Returning Series	Husbands	Nominated	
2014	Indie Series Awards	Best Web Series - Comedy	Husbands	Nominated	
2014	Indie Series Awards	Best Directing - Comedy	Eli Gonda	Nominated	
2014	Indie Series Awards	Best Writing - Comedy	Brad Bell and Jane Espenson	Nominated	
2014	Indie Series Awards	Best Lead Actor - Comedy	Brad Bell	Won	
2014	Indie Series Awards	Best Guest Star - Comedy	Amy Acker	Won	
2014	Indie Series Awards	Best Editing	Nathaniel Atcheson	Nominated	
2014	Webby Awards	Best Writing	Ottoman Empire	Nominated	
2014	Streamy Awards	Writing	Brad Bell and Jane Espenson	Nominated	
