= Tee Franklin =

American comic book writer

Tee Franklin is a comic book writer who has worked for Image, Marvel and DC Comics. Her work includes Bingo Love (published by Image Comics), Harley Quinn: The Animated Series: The Eat. Bang! Kill. Tour and Harley Quinn: The Animated Series: Legion of Bats! (published by DC Comics), and Edge of Spider-Verse #4 (published by Marvel Comics). Franklin is an advocate for increased representation of diversity in comics.

== Personal life ==
Tee Franklin was born on February 11. She was introduced to comics by a family member who would regularly babysit her. She continued to read them until she got married and had kids. Franklin divorced in 2011 and returned to the comic book world, starting out with reviews of comics, and interviews. In 2014, she realized how hard it was to find a comic with someone who looked like her in it or on it, so she took it upon herself to start writing those stories. She regularly speaks out against the lack of representation in comics and has gained the respect of several well-known comic creators, who "peer pressured" her into creating comics. She is a domestic abuse survivor and has written her miniseries Jook Joint as a therapeutic release. Franklin has autism and attention deficit hyperactivity disorder, and was in a car accident in 2014 that left her permanently physically disabled. She has been using a mobility aid since, and regularly speaks out about accommodating at conventions. She currently resides in New Jersey. Franklin is pansexual, but prefers the label queer.

== Career ==
Tee Franklin marked her debut as a writer with her graphic novel Bingo Love. It was kickstarted in 2016, raised $57,000, and was published by Image Comics, selling out before it even hit the shelves. The book has been nominated for a GLAAD Media Awards for Outstanding Comic Book and has also won Prism Comics’s 2017 Queer Press Grant. Jook Joint was originally written in 2016 following a suicide attempt. Her therapist suggested doing something constructive, after which she began writing about her trauma.

=== DC Comics ===
Franklin is credited by DC Comics as the writer of 10 comics featuring Harley Quinn. These include six comics in the Harley Quinn: The Animated Series: The Eat. Bang! Kill. Tour series published between August 2021 and January 2022. Tis The Season To Be Freezin' was released in December 2021 and Harley Quinn: The Real Sidekicks of New Gotham Special #1 was released in August 2022. Two Harley Quinn: The Animated Series: Legion of Bats! comics were published in October and November 2022.

Franklin considers Harley Quinn to be an anti-hero and a symbol for domestic abuse survivors. She believes Quinn has ADHD. Franklin drew inspiration for Harley Quinn: The Animated Series: The Eat. Bang! Kill. Tour from the 1991 film Thelma and Louise.

Franklin has also stated that she wrote Poison Ivy as autistic, but "figured DC would be against" this being mentioned in the comics.

=== Marvel Comics ===
Tee Franklin is credited by Marvel Comics as a writer of Edge of Spider-Verse #4, which was published in September 2022. Edge of Spider-Verse #4 features Charlotte Webber, aka Sun-Spider, a disabled Spider with Ehlers–Danlos syndrome who uses crutches and a wheelchair as mobility aids. Sun-Spider also briefly appears in the 2023 movie Spider-Man: Across the Spider-Verse, where she is voiced by Danielle Perez.

== See also ==
- List of African-American firsts
