= Tania del Rio =

American cartoonist

- Born: November 16
- Area: Cartoonist

Tania del Rio (born November 16) is an American cartoonist working mainly in comic books. She is a graduate of the Minneapolis College of Art and Design with a BFA in animation.

== Career ==
In 2003, Tania's manga entry, Lovesketch, was selected to appear in TOKYOPOP's Rising Stars of Manga anthology, volume 2. She worked for Archie Comics as the writer and artist of Sabrina, the Teenage Witch, a monthly comic that was given a shōjo manga makeover from 2004 to 2009.

In Fall, 2006, Tania's company, SteelRiver Studio, published a book through HarperCollins Publishers entitled Mangaka America, a gallery and tutorial book featuring emerging North American manga artists.

In November 2015, together with Will Staehle, she published "Warren the 13th and The All-Seeing Eye", an illustrated novel, the first of a trilogy that eventually included "Warren the 13th and the Whispering Woods", and "Warren the 13th and the Thirteen-Year Curse".

== Bibliography ==
=== Archie Comics ===
- Archie #636
- Archie & Friends #98-104 (Josie and the Pussycats manga), 152
- Betty & Veronica Friends Double Digest #242
- Betty and Veronica Jumbo Comics Digest #304 (Smells Like Teen Spirits), 306 (Sunny with a Chance of Rescue), 323 (Candy Ransom)
- Betty and Veronica Friends Forever: Power-Ups (Riververse Rescue)
- Betty and Veronica Friends Forever: Beach Party (Medusa Gone Wild!)
- World of Archie Jumbo Comics Digest #116 (story one), 144 (Trick or Eat)
- World of Betty and Veronica Jumbo Comics Digest #5 (The Big Dill!), 15 (Driving Me Crazy!), 19 (Frightful Faceoff!)
- Archie Comics Annual Digest #263 (Unlucky Lake Date)
- Archie Jumbo Comics #352 (Movie Magic)

=== Archie Comics ===
- Sonic the Hedgehog (Archie) #172

==== Dark Horse Comics ====
- Husbands #5

==== Marvel Comics ====
- Marvel: Now What?!

=== Archie Comics ===
- Archie & Friends #153
- Sabrina the Teenage Witch (Vol. 2) #57-100
- Sonic the Hedgehog (Archie) #151, 160-161

==== Marvel Comics ====
- Spider-Man & Araña Special #1
