= Lawrence Lindell =

American cartoonist, speaker, and musician

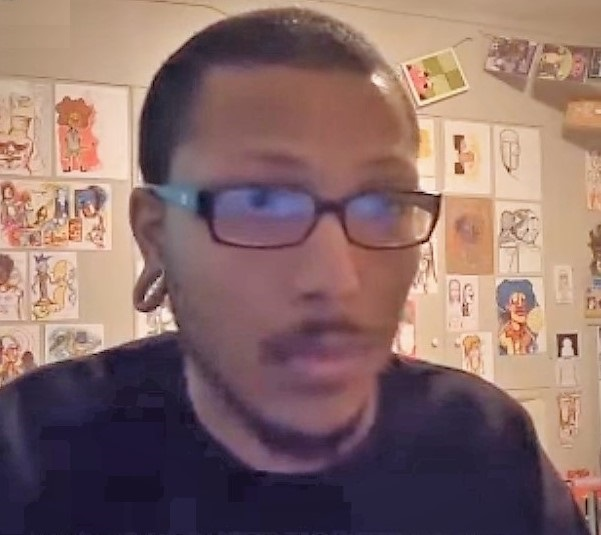
- Lindell at a panel at the Small Press Expo 2020
- Born: February 4, 1988 (age 38)
- Education: Otis College of Art and Design (BFA); California College of The Arts (MFA)
- Occupations: Cartoonist, author, musician, educator and artist
- Writing career
- Notable works: From Truth With Truth, Couldn’t Afford Therapy, So I Made This, From Black Boy With Love, The BAYlies, Blackward
- Website: lawrencelindell.com

Lawrence Lindell (born February 4, 1988) is an American cartoonist, speaker, and musician. He has written autobiographical comics including From Truth With Truth and Couldn’t Afford Therapy, So I Made This. His work covers mental health issues, blackness, and queerness. He lives in the Bay Area, California. Lindell is open about living with bipolar depression and PTSD; two of the main themes of his work. He has a middle-grade graphic novel called Buckle Up that was published in August 2024 with Random House Graphic. His 2023 graphic novel Blackward, with Drawn and Quarterly, was shortlisted for the 2024 Lambda Literary Award for Graphic Novel and nominated for the 2024 Eisner Awards for Best Publication for Teens.

== Early life and education ==
Lindell is from Compton, California and grew up in various cities in Los Angeles County. He received a Bachelor of Fine Arts degree from Otis College of Art and Design, where he majored in illustration and animation. He received his Master of Fine Arts in Comics from California College of the Arts in 2020.

== Career ==
In 2017, he produced the autobiographical comic Couldn’t Afford Therapy, So I Made This and From Black Boy With Love which gained media attention from outlets including Huffington Post, Afropunk, Atlanta Black Star, and NowThis.

In 2018 he published The Section, which is a web comic about blackness. The Section was later adapted into his 2023 graphic novel Blackward. He started the comics archive/collective The BAYlies.

In 2020 Lindell self published his graphic memoir "From Truth With Truth", that deals with how he navigated his mental health issues, parents divorce and healing. His Kickstarter campaign for The BAYlies magazine anthology (a comics magazine that features Bay Area based cartoonists of color and queer cartoonists) was successfully funded. Lindell and cartoonist Breena Nuñez started the small press Laneha House.

In 2021 Lindell's graphic memoir "From Truth With Truth" was nominated for The Dwayne McDuffie Award for Diversity in Comics and the Believer Book Award long list for Graphic Narrative. He signed on to publish his middle-grade graphic novel Buckle Up with Random House Graphic, which released in 2024.

In 2022 Lindell and Breena Nuñez started the Kinnard Awards with Laneha House. The award is named in honor of cartoonist Rupert Kinnard.

== Music, teaching, and talks ==
Lindell plays piano and performs live electronic sets. He has been releasing music since 2009, under various aliases and his own name. He started an independent label called Noise Met Sound in 2013, to release his music.

Lindell also teaches, leads zine workshops, hosts comic workshops and gives lectures.

In 2018 he was a special guest at Small Press Expo, where he was on the panel “Writing With Bipolar” alongside Ellen Forney, Keiler Roberts and moderated by Rob Clough.

In 2019, he was the guest of honor for San Francisco Zine Fest. He gave a lecture at Indiana Tech as part of their Tech Talk series. He was also a featured guest at Comic Arts Brooklyn 2019, where he was on the Decolonizing Comics Panel with fellow cartoonists Trinidad Escobar and Breena Nuñez, moderated by Minnie Phan.

Lindell has written comics for The New Yorker Razorcake and The San Francisco Examiner.

== Personal life ==
Lindell lives in California. He is married to fellow cartoonist Breena Nuñez. The two became engaged in 2018 at the East Bay Alternative Zine Fest, which is where they met in 2015 and married in 2020.

== Bibliography ==
- From Black Boy With Love, Self Published (2017).
- Couldn't Afford Therapy So I Made This, Self Published (2017).
- From Truth With Truth, Self Published (2020). ISBN 978-0-578-63103-5
- Still Couldn't Afford Therapy So I Made This, Again, Laneha House (2021). ISBN 978-1-7361135-1-6
- One with Breena Nuñez, Laneha House (2021). ISBN 978-1-7361135-2-3
- To Black Girl With Love, Laneha House (2021). ISBN 978-1-7361135-5-4
- The BAYlies Issue 1 as editor, Laneha House (2021) ISBN 978-1-7361135-3-0
- Brain Stuffed, Laneha House (2021). ISBN 978-1-7361135-8-5
- Laneha House No. 1 with Breena Nuñez, Laneha House (2021). ISBN 978-1-7361135-0-9
- Laneha House No. 2 with Breena Nuñez, Laneha House (2021). ISBN 978-1-7361135-6-1
- Laneha House No. 3 with Breena Nuñez, Laneha House (2021). ISBN 978-1-7361135-7-8
- Laneha House No. 4 with Breena Nuñez, Laneha House (2021). ISBN 978-1-7361135-4-7
- Laneha House No. 5 with Breena Nuñez, Laneha House (2022). ISBN 978-1-957172-00-2
- Laneha House No. 6 with Breena Nuñez, Laneha House (2022). ISBN 978-1-957172-05-7
- Comics on My Mind No. 1, Laneha House (2022). ISBN 978-1-957172-99-6
- Blackward, Drawn and Quarterly (2023). ISBN 978-1-770466-78-4
- Buckle Up, Random House Graphic (2024). ISBN 978-0-593479-78-0
- We All Got Something, Drawn and Quarterly (2025). ISBN 978-1-770467-73-6

== Exhibitions ==
- House of Black. A Black Comics and Zine Art Exhibition, Joint Exhibition with Breena Nuñez (2023).
- Resplendent: Identity & Visibility in Comics, Group Show (2022).
- A STORY LIKE MINE, Group Show (2022).
- Emerging Artist Showcase: Lawrence Lindell, Solo Art Exhibition (2021).
- The Fine Art of Radical Self-Publishing, Group Show (2020).
- Queer Comics Saves Lives, Solo Art Exhibition (2020).
- We are more: Stories by Queer Artists, Group Art Exhibition (2019).

== Film scores ==
Year	Title	Director	Notes / Accolades
2016	When Noise Met Sound: Apocalyptica	Raymond Metoyer	First film score Film released in 2016

== Discography ==
- A Nomad Story (2014)
- Eclectic Frequencies (2014)
- Magic Megaphone (2015)
- Cinema of Soul(2015)
- Lawrence Lindell (2015)
- Raw Imperfections (2016)
- Life of Color (2017)
- Afrospacetable (2019)

== Filmography ==
- No Straight Lines: The Rise Of Queer Comics (2021)

== Honors ==
2024

Excellence in Graphic Literature: Best in Young Adult Graphic Literature (Blackward)

Excellence in Graphic Literature: Book of the Year Finalists (Blackward)

CBC Teacher Favourites / CBC Librarian Favourites (Blackward)

CBC Young Adult Favourites (Blackward)

2023

Kirkus Starred Review (Blackward)

2021

The Believer Book Awards: Editors’ Long Lists- Graphic Narrative Finalist (From Truth With Truth)
