= Buckle Up Music Festival =

Music festival

- Genre: Country music
- Dates: Third Weekend of July
- Locations: BLUE ASH SUMMIT PARK 4335 Glendale-Milford Road Cincinnati, OH 45242
- Years active: 2014-2016
- Founders: Bill Donabedian
- Website: buckleupfestival.com

The Buckle Up Music Festival was a three-day country and roots music festival held in Cincinnati, Ohio, at Sawyer Point Park and Yeatman's Cove on the bank of the Ohio River. The festival began on July 18, 2014, and featured over 80 performances on six stages. It was founded by Bill Donabedian, co-founder of MidPoint Music Festival and former managing director of Fountain Square.

Headliners for the inaugural year included Willie Nelson, Alison Krauss & Union Station, Emmylou Harris, and Alabama.

Despite its inaugural 2014 event being a financial success, it took a hiatus in 2015 and its 2016 showing was canceled only ten days before it was scheduled to begin. While no official reason was given at the time beyond "unforeseen circumstances", Donabedian alleged in a 2023 interview that it was due to disagreements with the city over a since repealed law concerning taxing of live events. A lawsuit was originally filed in 2015, which was ultimately settled in Donabedian's favor with the city being ordered to pay him $56,000 in restitution

== Festival dates ==
- July 18–20, 2014
- August 5–6, 2016 (cancelled)

== See also ==
- List of country music festivals
