= Brad Bell (producer) =

American screenwriter and producer

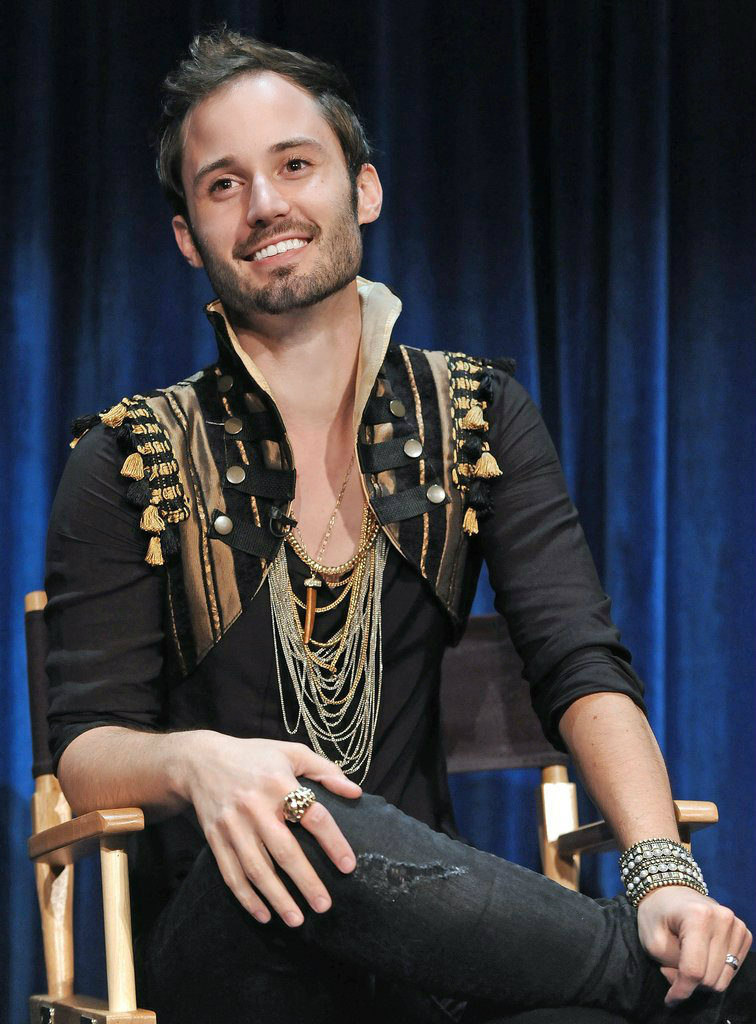
- Bell in 2012
- Born: Bradley C. Bell; October 4, 1985 (age 40); Dallas, Texas, United States
- Other name: Cheeks
- Occupations: Producer, writer, actor, musician
- Years active: 2006–present

Bradley C. Bell (born October 4, 1985) is an American television producer and screenwriter, actor, musician, and comic book author. He is best known as co-creator and showrunner of the acclaimed web series Husbands, in which he also stars. He has also released three electronic EPs, and penned the comic book series Husbands: The Comic, based on his web series. Brad's rise to stardom was built from the social media platform "Youtube", which is where he started to grow his fanbase. Brad, also nicknamed "Cheeks", currently works and consults for VH1's Pop Up Video.

== Early life and education ==
Brad Bell was born in Dallas, Texas. Early on, Bell identified as an artist, spending his childhood convinced that the road to success would start in Los Angeles. Upon moving to Hollywood, Bell studied film at Los Angeles City College and later became a graduate of The Second City Training Center.

== Career ==
=== Early work ===
In 2008, he started his own YouTube channel, on behalf of which Bell created the "sugar coated satirical persona" named 'Cheeks'. As Cheeks, Bell wrote and performed critical commentary on celebrities, pop culture and politics. A fanbase was rapidly growing and Bell's reputation began to take form. As a satirist, Bell follows a philosophy described by organizers of the Ig Nobel Prize, "first make people laugh, and then make them think".

One journalist writes of Bell's persona, "under all the glitter and glitz, Cheeks is an incisive, intelligent talent who couches his social criticism in showbiz flair, because he knows what works". Though Cheeks' signature style of exuberance led some to deride it as a stereotype, Bell counters, "[If] you're not going to watch me long enough to figure out that there's more to me than my fabulousness, you're of the exact same mentality as the people you're worried are going to judge you based on my behavior".

=== Husbands ===
Bell caught the attention of television writer Jane Espenson when she discovered his pointed dissection of Carrie Prejean's public response to a question of marriage equality, during the 2009 Miss USA pageant. Speaking to Out in August 2012, Espenson said, "I was curious – who was this person who had at his age accumulated writing skills that had taken me 20 years?" A friendship developed between them eventually resulting in creating the newlywed sitcom Husbands. The first season of Husbands was shot in August 2011, and premiered to critical praise, including The New Yorker's first ever review of an online series, in which Bell was hailed as "the standout, a confident flibbertigibbet who regards himself as a modern Blanche DuBois".

The "crackling cultural commentary" of Bell's early YouTube work echoed in Husbands, lauded by Time magazine as a "much more complex and interesting story about changing mores and the conflict between individuals and social causes than, say, the pilot of NBC's The New Normal".

Espenson–a frequent collaborator of Joss Whedon–noted, "Brad has the showrunner gene", and said that Bell's work as an executive producer on Husbands reminded her of the famed Avengers director, adding, "If there is a Joss Whedon among us, it's Brad Bell". Whedon himself has been a "fan of [Brad]", since Bell's performance in The Golden Guys, an adaptation of The Golden Girls with young men in the leads, hosted at Whedon's residence during a private party.

The series was expanded in the form of a six-issue digital comic book series called Husbands: The Comic, published by Dark Horse Comics. Bell's work on Husbands inspired Jane Espenson to include the Buffyverse's first gay male slayer in season nine of Buffy the Vampire Slayer.

Bell wrote an article in The Huffington Post about unoriginal aspects of storytelling, saying "Maybe instead of avoiding the cliché, we can somehow reinvent the wheel", to which he concludes, "Husbands, both as a sitcom and as a comic book, embraces clichés, stereotypes and tropes to make a point: Most old ideas are only as meaningless or as negative as their context. Few of these notions are intrinsically detrimental, as the judgements we attach to them exist only in our minds".

=== Television paradigm ===
Bell originated the concept that the word "television" is better suited for the Internet than traditional broadcast media, and was invited to speak at Google on August 17, 2012, to elaborate on his observation:

Television is a hybrid word, Greek and Latin. 'Tele' meaning far and then 'vision' meaning, well obviously, vision...So, when you think of NBC, the 'far vision' is L.A. to New York...On the other hand, you upload something to YouTube and within minutes... Tokyo.

In addition to this linguistic examination, Bell pointed out that television is defined as a telecommunication medium. He goes on to say, "As anyone who's ever been in a relationship knows, communication is a two-way street". Because communication requires both parties to interact with each other, Bell reasons that the Internet better fulfills the criteria for television than a broadcast platform. He sums this idea up by concluding, "the Internet is more television than television".

Bell elaborated more on the issue:

Oddly though, the standards by which people define television isn't the platform. They just think it is. For example, Orange Is the New Black is a television show, right? I would say yes. But, by platform specifications, it's a web series. Why? Because it's delivered via the Internet, either on your computer, tablet or set-top boxes and smart TVs. Cable and broadcast (which have actually both been the same platform for years, digital) is a different platform than the one delivering Netflix or YouTube. [...] The term web-series is irrelevant, because the platforms are irrelevant. It's all television now. It's just a matter of professional television versus amateur hour. The Internet is not "the future of television." Neither are the two slowly merging. That's already happened. It's only the perception of the public that lags behind.

=== Other work ===
Bell's work in music began in 2008, co-writing and performing the title track for horror short film Side Effect. This success was followed by the release of three EPs; The Boy From Venus (2008), Glambition (2009) and T.C.M.C. (2010), along with a collection of ringtones, 2009's Put a Ringtone on It. Bell has also worked as consulting producer for VH1's Pop-Up Video.

== Television credits ==
Series	Episode number	Title	Credit	Original air date
Husbands	1.1	"Waking Up in Vegas"	Writer (with Jane Espenson)	September 13, 2011
Husbands	1.2	"We Can't Be Married"	Writer (with Jane Espenson)	September 15, 2011
Husbands	1.3	"Being Britney!"	Writer (with Jane Espenson)	September 20, 2011
Husbands	1.4	"A Decent Proposal"	Writer (with Jane Espenson)	September 22, 2011
Husbands	1.5	"IDEHTW"	Writer (with Jane Espenson)	September 27, 2011
Husbands	1.6	"Haley, The Life Coach"	Writer (with Jane Espenson)	September 29, 2011
Husbands	1.7	"Normal People"	Writer (with Jane Espenson)	October 4, 2011
Husbands	1.8	"This Together Thing"	Writer (with Jane Espenson)	October 6, 2011
Husbands	1.9	"Instant Love"	Writer (with Jane Espenson)	October 11, 2011
Husbands	1.10	"Return of the Zebra"	Writer (with Jane Espenson)	October 13, 2011
Husbands	1.11	"Winky Face"	Writer (with Jane Espenson)	October 18, 2011
Husbands	2.1	"Appropriate Is Not the Word"	Writer (with Jane Espenson)	August 15, 2012
Husbands	2.2	"The Straightening"	Writer (with Jane Espenson)	August 29, 2012
Husbands	2.3	"A Better Movie of What We're Like"	Writer (with Jane Espenson)	September 12, 2012
Husbands	3.1	"I Do Over – Part 1"	Writer (with Jane Espenson)	August 15, 2013
Husbands	3.2	"I Do Over – Part 2"	Writer (with Jane Espenson)	August 22, 2013
Husbands	3.3	"I Do Over – Part 3"	Writer (with Jane Espenson)	August 29, 2013
Husbands	3.4	"I Dream of Cleaning – Part 1"	Writer (with Jane Espenson)	September 19, 2013
Husbands	3.5	"I Dream of Cleaning – Part 2"	Writer (with Jane Espenson)	September 26, 2013
Husbands	3.6	"I Dream of Cleaning – Part 3"	Writer (with Jane Espenson)	October 3, 2013

== Production credits ==
Year	Title	Credited as			Role	Notes
Year	Title	Producer	Writer	Actor	Role	Notes
2006	Why Can't I Be You?	No	No	Yes	Himself	Episode: "#1.6"
2008	Side Effect	Yes	No	No	—N/a	Associate producer
2009	Lushes	No	No	Yes	Basil	Short film
2010	Front Men	Yes	No	Yes	Cheeks	Executive producer
2011	Torchwood: Miracle Day	No	No	Yes	Nurse Chris	Episode: "The Categories of Life"
2011–2013	Husbands	Yes	Yes	Yes	Cheeks	Co-creator, 20 episodes as writer and executive producer
2012	Pop-Up Video	Yes	No	No	—N/a	Consulting producer
2014	Spring Cleaning	No	Yes	No	—N/a	Short film

== Accolades ==
Year	Award	Award category	Title of work	Result	Ref.
2012	Indie Soap Awards	Best Actor (Comedy)	Husbands	Nominated	
2012	Indie Soap Awards	Best Writing (Comedy)	Husbands (shared with Jane Espenson)	Nominated	
2012	Webby Awards	Best Writing	Husbands (shared with Jane Espenson)	Nominated	
2013	International Academy of Web Television	Best Writing (Comedy)	Husbands (shared with Jane Espenson)	Nominated	
2013	Streamy Awards	Best Male Performance: Comedy	Husbands	Nominated	
2013	Streamy Awards	Personality of the Year		Nominated	
2013	Indie Soap Awards	Best Actor (Comedy)	Husbands	Won	
2013	Indie Soap Awards	Best Writing (Comedy)	Husbands (shared with Jane Espenson)	Won	
2014	Writers Guild of America Awards	Short Form New Media – Original	Husbands episodes "I Do Over Part 1–2" (shared with Jane Espenson)	Nominated	
2014	International Academy of Web Television	Best Male Performance in a Comedy	Husbands	Won	
2014	International Academy of Web Television	Best Writing (Comedy)	Husbands (shared with Jane Espenson)	Won	
2014	International Academy of Web Television	Best Ensemble Performance	Husbands (shared with Sean Hemeon)	Won	
2014	Indie Series Awards	Best Writing – Comedy	Husbands (shared with Jane Espenson)	Nominated	
2014	Indie Series Awards	Best Lead Actor – Comedy	Husbands	Won	
2014	Streamy Awards	Writing	Husbands (shared with Jane Espenson)	Nominated	
