= Jane Espenson =

American television writer and producer (born 1964)

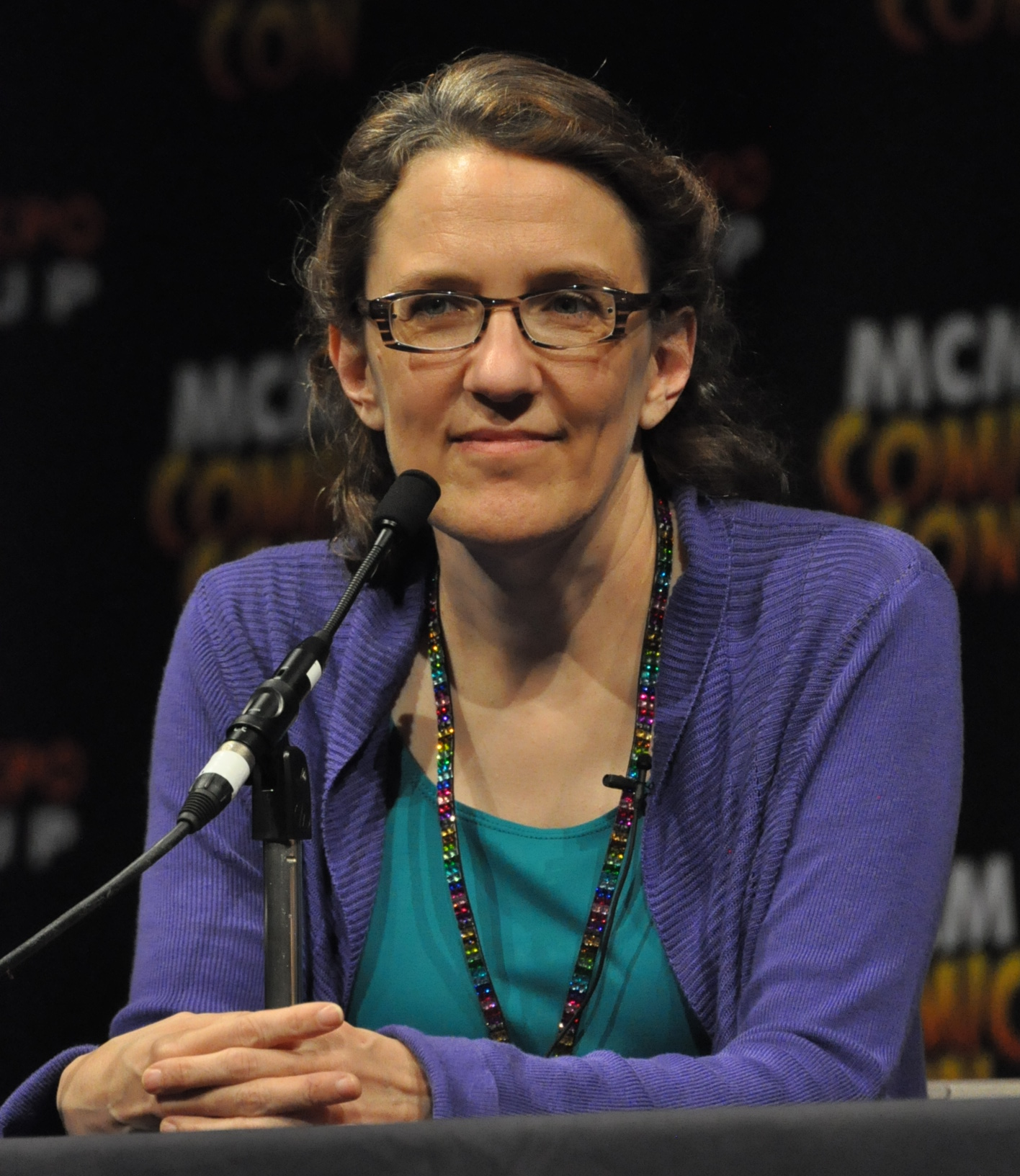
- Espenson in May 2013
- Born: July 14, 1964 (age 62); Ames, Iowa, U.S.
- Occupations: Television producer & writer
- Years active: 1994–present
- Website: http://www.janeespenson.com/

Jane Espenson (born July 14, 1964) is an American television writer and producer.

Espenson has worked on both situation comedies and serial dramas. She had a five-year stint as a writer and producer on Buffy the Vampire Slayer and shared a Hugo Award with Drew Goddard for her writing on the episode "Conversations with Dead People".

After her work on Buffy, she wrote and produced episodes of The O.C. and Gilmore Girls among other series. From 2006 to 2010, she worked on Battlestar Galactica and several projects related to it. Between 2009 and 2010, she served on Caprica, as co-executive and executive producer and co-showrunner. In 2010, she wrote an episode of HBO's Game of Thrones, eventually earning a Writers' Guild Award for her involvement with the show. In 2011 she joined the writing staff for the fourth season of the British television program Torchwood, which aired on BBC One in the United Kingdom and Starz in the United States during mid-2011.

From 2011 to 2018, Espenson worked as a consulting producer and co-executive producer on ABC's series Once Upon a Time, and also wrote and directed some of the show's supplementary DVD content and helped develop the show's spin-off series. She co-wrote and produced Husbands, an independent original web series, with co-creator Brad Bell. She and Bell were nominated for a Writers' Guild Award for their work on the series. Espenson also contributed writing to seasons 1 and 3 of the Marvel series Jessica Jones, and was an executive producer of the HBO series The Nevers.

She is a writer and executive producer on the Apple TV+ series Foundation.

She has written numerous comic books, edited multiple volumes of essays, and published several short stories.

== Early life ==
Espenson grew up in Ames, Iowa, and graduated from Ames High School. As a teenager, Espenson found out that M*A*S*H accepted spec scripts without requiring the writer to have industry representation. Though she was not an established writer, she attempted to write a script. She recalls, "It was a disaster. I never sent it. I didn't know the correct format. I didn't know the address of where to send it, and then I thought, they can't really hire me until I finish junior high anyway."

== Linguistics studies ==
Espenson studied linguistics as an undergraduate and graduate at University of California, Berkeley. She worked as a cognitive linguistics research assistant for George Lakoff, who acknowledged her work on the metaphorical understanding of event structure in English and credited her with recognizing the existence of the phenomenon of location-object duality in metaphors pairs. Lakoff also mentioned her year-long work on the "metaphorical structure of causation" in the acknowledgments section of Philosophy in the Flesh: The Embodied Mind and Its Challenge to Western Thought (1999, ISBN 0-465-05674-1).

While in graduate school, she submitted several spec scripts for Star Trek: The Next Generation as part of a script submission program open to amateur writers; Espenson has referred to the program as the "last open door of show business".

== Career ==
In 1992, Espenson won a spot in the Disney Writing Fellowship, which led to work on a number of sitcoms, including ABC's comedy Dinosaurs and Touchstone Television's Monty. This was followed by work on the sitcoms Me and the Boys and Something So Right. In 1997 she joined the writing staff of Ellen Degeneres's sitcom Ellen.

=== Buffy the Vampire Slayer ===
After years in sitcoms, Espenson decided to switch from comedic to dramatic writing and submitted her sample scripts to Buffy the Vampire Slayer.

In 1998, Espenson joined Mutant Enemy Productions as executive story editor for the third season of Buffy the Vampire Slayer. Over the rest of the run of the series, Espenson wrote or co-wrote twenty-three episodes, starting with "Band Candy" and ending with Buffy's penultimate episode, "End of Days". After her role as an executive story editor, she was promoted to co-producer in season four. In the fifth season she was promoted again to producer. She took up the role of supervising producer in the sixth season and was promoted once more to co-executive producer in the final season.

She wrote episodes both humorous (e.g. "Triangle" and "Intervention") and serious (such as "After Life"). Espenson and Drew Goddard co-wrote the seventh-season episode "Conversations with Dead People," for which they won the Hugo Award for Best Short Dramatic Presentation in 2003.

Espenson is credited as the writer or co-writer of the following Buffy episodes:

Episode number	Title	Credit	Original air date
3.06	"Band Candy"	Writer	November 10, 1998
3.11	"Gingerbread"	Teleplay (story by Espenson & Thania St. John)	January 12, 1999
3.18	"Earshot"	Writer	September 21, 1999
4.03	"The Harsh Light of Day"	Writer	October 19, 1999
4.08	"Pangs"	Writer	November 23, 1999
4.11	"Doomed"	Writer (with David Fury & Marti Noxon)	January 18, 2000
4.12	"A New Man"	Writer	January 25, 2000
4.17	"Superstar"	Writer	April 4, 2000
5.03	"The Replacement"	Writer	October 10, 2000
5.11	"Triangle"	Writer	January 9, 2001
5.12	"Checkpoint"	Writer (with Douglas Petrie)	January 23, 2001
5.15	"I Was Made to Love You"	Writer	February 20, 2001
5.18	"Intervention"	Writer	April 24, 2001
6.03	"After Life"	Writer	October 9, 2001
6.04	"Flooded"	Writer (with Douglas Petrie)	October 16, 2001
6.05	"Life Serial"	Writer (with David Fury)	October 23, 2001
6.12	"Doublemeat Palace"	Writer	January 29, 2002
7.03	"Same Time, Same Place"	Writer	October 8, 2002
7.07	"Conversations with Dead People"	Writer (with Drew Goddard)	November 12, 2002
7.08	"Sleeper"	Writer (with David Fury)	November 19, 2002
7.14	"First Date"	Writer	February 11, 2003
7.16	"Storyteller"	Writer	February 25, 2003
7.21	"End of Days"	Writer (with Douglas Petrie)	May 13, 2003

She also co-/wrote several comic book stories for Tales of the Slayers, Tales of the Vampires and Buffy the Vampire Slayer Season Eight, the one-shots Jonathan and Reunion and the limited series Haunted.

=== Battlestar Galactica and Caprica ===
Espenson joined the crew of Sci Fi's Battlestar Galactica (BSG) just after Battlestar Galactica: Razor, BSG's first television movie, was conceived. As one of BSG's co-executive producers, she worked on every fourth-season episode starting with "He That Believeth in Me"; she was also the writer of "Escape Velocity" and "The Hub" and co-wrote The Face of the Enemy webisodes. Prior to joining the show's staff she wrote one third-season episode and co-wrote another. In August 2008, the Los Angeles Times broke the news that Espenson was the writer behind BSG's second television movie, The Plan, news confirmed in her writer's blog. In January 2009 it was announced that she had joined the spin-off series Caprica as co-executive producer and would take on showrunner duties midway through the first season. Espenson later gave up showrunning duties to focus more on writing.

=== Torchwood ===
In August 2010 it was announced that Torchwood creator, lead writer and executive producer Russell T. Davies had hired Espenson to write for the show's fourth series, Torchwood: Miracle Day to be broadcast in 2011. She later confirmed that she would be writing episodes 3, 5, 7 and co-writing episode 8 (with Ryan Scott) and episode 10 (with Davies). Prior to her involvement with Torchwood, Espenson had said she was a fan of the show, particularly the third series, "Children of Earth." To tie in with the launch of Torchwood: Miracle Day, Espenson and Scott collaborated on the Starz-produced 2011 Torchwood webseries entitled Torchwood: Web of Lies, which stars American actress Eliza Dushku. Following the broadcast of each episode of "Miracle Day" on Starz, Espenson wrote a blog on AfterElton mixing her reaction to the episode with behind the scenes information on the devising process.

=== Husbands ===
In 2011 Espenson also co-wrote and produced her first independent web series with partner Brad Bell. Entitled Husbands, it revolved around the life of two newly married gay men. Espenson self-funded the first season. A Kickstarter campaign and the involvement of CW Seed allowed subsequent production. The show eventually comprised four "seasons" and concluded in 2014. The series premiered Tuesday September 13, 2011. The series also generated Husbands, a hardback comic-book collection of stories rendered in a variety of different drawing styles, from Dark Horse Comics (ISBN 9781616551308).

=== Once Upon a Time ===
In May 2011, Espenson was brought on to the ABC fantasy series Once Upon a Time, as a writer and consulting producer. She stayed with the show for its entire seven-year run, and became a co-executive producer on the project. She was also involved in creation and writing of the spin-off series Once Upon a Time in Wonderland.

=== Game of Thrones ===
In 2011, working as a freelancer, Espenson wrote episode 6 of season 1 of Game of Thrones, titled "A Golden Crown". It is notable as one of only four Game of Thrones episodes written by women.

=== Jessica Jones ===
In 2015, during the hiatus between seasons of Once Upon a Time, Espenson consulted on the series Jessica Jones, earning a "thanks to" in the credits. In 2019, she returned for a larger role on the staff, and wrote the eleventh episode of the third season "A.K.A. Hellcat".

=== The Nevers ===
In 2018, Espenson joined the HBO series The Nevers, as a writer and executive producer. The series premiered on April 11, 2021.

=== Foundation ===
Espenson consulted on the Apple TV+ series Foundation in season 1, joining the writing staff in season 2 with writing credits on half of the episodes.

=== Other ===
Espenson has written episodes for several other television shows, including episode 4.17 ("Accession") of Star Trek: Deep Space Nine, and one episode ("Shindig") of Firefly. She has worked on Angel, Tru Calling, The Inside, The Batman, Andy Barker, P.I., Jake in Progress and Dollhouse, and was the co-creator of Warehouse 13.

Espenson is the editor of the book Finding Serenity: Anti-Heroes, Lost Shepherds and Space Hookers in Joss Whedon's Firefly (BenBella Books, 2005, ISBN 1-933771-21-6), a collection of non-fiction essays on the television show Firefly. She edited the follow-up collection Serenity Found: More Unauthorized Essays on Joss Whedon's Firefly Universe (BenBella Books, 2007, ISBN 9781933771212) She is the editor of Inside Joss' Dollhouse: From Alpha to Rossum (BenBella Books, 2010, ISBN 9781935251989), a similar collection of essays about Dollhouse.

Espenson wrote the short story "What Holds Us Down", which appears in Still Flying from Titan Press, ISBN 1848565062. Her short story "Int. Wolf-Night" appears in Empower: Fight Like a Girl ISBN 9780692210116 She also has short stories which appear in the Tales of the Slayers book series. Her short story, "Nobel Prize Speech Draft of Paul Winterhoeven, With Personal Notes", was published in the September 2021 issue of Future Science Fiction Digest.

In 2016, Espenson served on the MoPOP (Museum of Pop Culture, Seattle) committee to select inductees into the Science Fiction and Fantasy Hall of Fame. She is featured as a video/voice commentator in the museum itself.

Espenson has written for three of the 101 Best Television Series as determined by the Writers Guild of America: Battlestar Galactica, Game of Thrones and Buffy the Vampire Slayer.

== Appearances in media ==
Espenson has appeared as an "expert witness" on the Judge John Hodgman podcast episodes "Science Friction" and "Vampirical Evidence." In 2012, Espenson was a guest on the interview series Cocktails with Stan, with hosts Stan Lee and Jenna Busch. She has also been a guest on The Sound of Young America, with Jesse Thorn. She has guested on the Gilmore Guys podcast and on the Slayerfest podcast, about Gilmore Girls and Buffy respectively.

She appears in the documentary interview series James Cameron's Story of Science Fiction and Showrunners.

== Production credits ==
Television
Year	Title	Credited as		Notes
Year	Title	Screenwriter	Producer	Notes
1994	Monty	Yes		Episode written: "The Principal's Interest"
1994	Dinosaurs	Yes		Episodes written: "Driving Miss Ethyl" "Variations on a Theme Park"
1995	Me and the Boys	Yes		Episode written: "The Age of Reason"
1996	Star Trek: Deep Space Nine	Yes		Episode written: "Accession"
1996	Nowhere Man	Yes		Episode written: "Zero Minus Ten"
1996–1997	Something So Right	Yes		Episodes written: "Something About Jack's Ex" "Something About Thanksgiving" "Something About a Silver Anniversary" "Something About Secrets & Rules"
1997–1998	Ellen	Yes		Episodes written: "Like a Virgin" "Womyn Fest"
1998–2003	Buffy the Vampire Slayer	Yes	Yes	23 episodes written, 88 episodes produced
1999–2000	Angel	Yes		Episodes written: "Rm w/a Vu" "Guise Will Be Guise"
2002	Firefly	Yes		Episode written: "Shindig"
2003	The O.C.	Yes		Episode written: "The Gamble"
2003–2004	Gilmore Girls	Yes	Yes	Episodes written: "Chicken or Beef?" "The Reigning Lorelai"; 22 episodes as co-executive producer
2005	Tru Calling	Yes	Yes	Episode written: "In the Dark"; 6 episodes as co-executive producer
2005	The Inside	Yes	Yes	Episodes written: "Skin and Bone" "Gem" "Aidan" "Everything Nice"; 13 episodes as co-executive producer
2005–2006	Jake in Progress	Yes	Yes	Episode written: "The Two Jakes"; 20 episodes as co-executive producer
2006–2009	Battlestar Galactica	Yes	Yes	Episodes written: "The Passage" "Dirty Hands" "Escape Velocity" "The Hub" "Deadlock"; 20 episodes as co-executive producer
2007	Andy Barker, P.I.	Yes	Yes	Episode written: "Fairway, My Lovely"; 3 episodes as consulting producer
2007	The Batman	Yes		Episodes written: "The Joining: Part 1" "The Joining: Part 2"
2007	Eureka	Yes		Episode written: "Family Reunion"
2007	Battlestar Galactica: Razor Flashbacks		Yes	7 episodes as co-executive producer
2007	Battlestar Galactica: Razor		Yes	TV movie
2008-2009	Battlestar Galactica: The Face of the Enemy	Yes	Yes	10 episodes as writer and executive producer
2009	Dollhouse	Yes	Yes	Episodes written: "Haunted" "Briar Rose"; 8 episodes as consulting producer
2009	Battlestar Galactica: The Plan	Yes	Yes	TV movie
2009	Warehouse 13	Yes		Creator; Episode written: "Pilot"
2010	Caprica	Yes	Yes	Episodes written: "Gravedancing" "Apotheosis"; 17 episodes produced
2011	Game of Thrones	Yes		Episode written: "A Golden Crown"
2011	Torchwood: Miracle Day	Yes	Yes	Episodes written: "Dead of Night" "The Categories of Life" "Immortal Sins" "End of the Road" "The Blood Line"; 10 episodes as co-executive producer
2011–2018	Once Upon a Time	Yes	Yes	31 episodes written 68 episodes as consulting producer
2013	Once Upon a Time in Wonderland	Yes	Yes	Episodes written: "Down the Rabbit Hole" "Bad Blood"
2019	Jessica Jones	Yes	Yes	Episode written: "A.K.A Hellcat"
2021	The Nevers	Yes	Yes	Episodes written: "Exposure" "True"; 6 episodes as executive producer
2021	Fantasy Island	Yes		Episodes written: "His and Hers" / "The Heartbreak Hotel"; 1 episode as teleplay writer
2021–2025	Foundation	Yes	Yes	Writer: 11 episodes (of which 1 episode as teleplay writer); Co-executive producer: 15 episodes Executive producer: 10 episodes
2026	Fallout	Yes		Episode written: "The Demon in the Snow"

Online media
Year	Title	Credited as		Notes
Year	Title	Screenwriter	Producer	Notes
2009	Battlestar Galactica: The Face of the Enemy	Yes		Webisodes
2011	Buffy the Vampire Slayer Season Eight	Yes		Motion comic
2011	Torchwood: Web of Lies	Yes		Episode written: "Missing Day: Part 1"
2011–2014	Husbands	Yes	Yes	Co-creator, 20 episodes as writer and executive producer

== Accolades ==
List of awards and award nominations
Year	Award	Award category	Title of work	Result
2003	Hugo Award	Best Dramatic Presentation, Short Form	"Conversations with Dead People" (Buffy the Vampire Slayer episode)	Won
2009	Streamy Awards	Best Writing for a Dramatic Web Series	Battlestar Galactica: The Face of the Enemy	Won
2009	Emmy Award	Short-format Live-action Entertainment Program (shared with Ronald D. Moore, David Eick, and Harvey Frand)	Battlestar Galactica: The Face of the Enemy	Nominated
2012	Writers Guild of America Award	Drama Series (shared with D. B. Weiss, George R. R. Martin, David Benioff and Bryan Cogman)	Game of Thrones	Nominated
2012	Writers Guild of America Award	New Series (shared with D. B. Weiss, Bryan Cogman, David Benioff and George R. R. Martin)	Game of Thrones	Nominated
2012	Indie Soap Awards	Best Writing (Comedy) (shared with Brad Bell)	Husbands	Nominated
2012	Hugo Award	Best Dramatic Presentation, Long Form (shared with David Benioff, D. B. Weiss, Bryan Cogman, George R. R. Martin, Tim Van Patten, Brian Kirk, Daniel Minahan and Alan Taylor)	Game of Thrones, Season One	Won
2013	International Academy of Web Television	Best Writing (Comedy) (shared with Brad Bell)	Husbands	Nominated
2013	Indie Soap Awards	Best Writing (Comedy) (shared with Brad Bell)	Husbands	Won
2014	Writers Guild of America Awards	Short Form New Media – Original (shared with Brad Bell)	Husbands episodes "I Do Over Part 1–2"	Nominated
2014	International Academy of Web Television	Best Writing (Comedy) (shared with Brad Bell)	Husbands	Won
2014	Indie Series Awards	Best Writing (Comedy) (shared with Brad Bell)	Husbands	Nominated
2014	Streamy Awards	Writing (shared with Brad Bell)	Husbands	Nominated
2014	Inkpot Award			Won
2015	Etheria Film Night	Inspiration Award		Won
