= Eisner Award for Best Writer =

American comic book industry award

- Awarded for: Best Writer for Comic Books
- Country: United States
- First award: 1988
- Most recent winner: Mariko Tamaki
- Website: www.comic-con.org/awards/eisner-awards-current-info

The Eisner Award for Best Writer is an award for "creative achievement" in American comic books.

== Winners and nominees ==
Year	Nominee	Titles	Ref.
1980s
1988	Alan Moore	Watchmen (DC)	
1988	Mike Baron	Nexus (First Comics)	
1988	Paul Chadwick	Concrete (Dark Horse)	
1988	Matt Wagner	Grendel (Comico)	
1989	Alan Moore	Batman: The Killing Joke (DC)	
1989	Mike Baron	Nexus (First Comics)	
1989	William Messner-Loebs	Jonny Quest (Comico)	
1989	Grant Morrison	Animal Man (DC)	
1989	Ann Nocenti	Daredevil (Marvel)	
1990s
1990	There was no Eisner Award ceremony, or awards distributed, in 1990, due to widespread balloting mix-ups.		
1991	Neil Gaiman	The Sandman (DC)	
1991	Steve Gerber		
1991	Gilbert Hernandez	Love and Rockets (Fantagraphics)	
1991	Scott McCloud	Zot! (Kitchen Sink)	
1991	Frank Miller		
1991	Alan Moore	Miracleman (Eclipse)	
1991	Grant Morrison		
1991	Dave Sim	Cerebus (Aardvark-Vanaheim)	
1991	James Vance		
1991	Kate Worley	Omaha the Cat Dancer (Kitchen Sink)	
1992	Neil Gaiman	The Sandman (DC), Books of Magic (DC), Miracleman (Eclipse)	
1992	Peter Bagge	Hate (Fantagraphics)	
1992	Sarah Byam	Billi 99 (Dark Horse)	
1992	Alan Moore	From Hell (Spiderbaby Grafix/Tundra), Lost Girls (Spiderbaby Grafix/Tundra)	
1992	Grant Morrison	Doom Patrol (DC)	
1992	Harvey Pekar	American Splendor (Tundra)	
1992	Dave Sim	Cerebus (Aardvark-Vanaheim)	
1993	Neil Gaiman	Miracleman (Eclipse), The Sandman (DC)	
1993	Peter Bagge	Hate (Fantagraphics)	
1993	Dennis Eichhorn	Real Stuff (Fantagraphics)	
1993	Garth Ennis	Hellblazer (DC)	
1993	Roberta Gregory	Naughty Bits (Fantagraphics)	
1993	Frank Miller	"Sin City," Dark Horse Presents (Dark Horse)	
1993	Alan Moore	"From Hell" and "Lost Girls," Taboo (Spiderbaby Grafix/Tundra)	
1993	Dave Sim	Cerebus (Aardvark-Vanaheim)	
1994	Neil Gaiman	The Sandman (DC/Vertigo), Death: The High Cost of Living (DC/Vertigo)	
1994	Peter David	The Incredible Hulk (Marvel), The Incredible Hulk: Future Imperfect (Marvel)	
1994	Garth Ennis	Hellblazer (DC/Vertigo)	
1994	Alan Moore	1963 (Image), Spawn #8 (Image), A Small Killing (VG Graphics/Dark Horse)	
1994	Dave Sim	Cerebus (Aardvark-Vanaheim), Spawn #10 (Image)	
1995	Alan Moore	From Hell (Kitchen Sink)	
1995	Dwayne McDuffie	Icon (Milestone)	
1995	Harvey Pekar	American Splendor: A Step Out of the Nest (Dark Horse), Our Cancer Year (with Joyce Brabner) (Four Walls Eight Windows)	
1995	James Robinson	Starman (DC)	
1995	Matt Wagner/Steven Seagle	Sandman Mystery Theatre (DC/Vertigo)	
1996	Alan Moore	From Hell (Kitchen Sink)	
1996	Kurt Busiek	Kurt Busiek's Astro City (Jukebox Productions/Image)	
1996	Garth Ennis	Preacher (DC/Vertigo), Goddess (DC/Vertigo)	
1996	Neil Gaiman	The Sandman (DC/Vertigo)	
1996	Grant Morrison	The Invisibles (DC/Vertigo)	
1997	Alan Moore	From Hell (Kitchen Sink), Supreme (Maximum Press)	
1997	Kurt Busiek	Kurt Busiek's Astro City (Jukebox Productions/Homage), Untold Tales of Spider-Man (Marvel)	
1997	Neil Gaiman	The Sandman (DC/Vertigo), Death: The Time of Your Life (DC/Vertigo)	
1997	John Ostrander	The Spectre (DC)	
1997	James Robinson	Starman (DC), Leave It to Chance (Homage)	
1997	Mark Waid	The Flash (DC), Impulse (DC), Kingdom Come (DC), Captain America (Marvel)	
1998	Garth Ennis	Hitman (DC), Preacher (DC/Vertigo), Unknown Soldier (DC/Vertigo), Bloody Mary: Lady Liberty (DC/Helix)	
1998	Kurt Busiek	Kurt Busiek's Astro City (Jukebox Productions/Homage), The Wizard's Tale (Jukebox Productions/Homage)	
1998	Scott McCloud	Superman Adventures (DC)	
1998	John Ostrander	The Spectre (DC), The Kents (DC), Tangent Comics: Nightwing (DC)	
1998	James Robinson	Starman (DC), The Shade (DC), Tangent Comics: Green Lantern (DC), Leave It to Chance (Homage)	
1999	Kurt Busiek	Kurt Busiek's Astro City (Homage/WildStorm/Image), The Avengers (Marvel)	
1999	Jeph Loeb	Superman for All Seasons (DC)	
1999	Greg Rucka	Whiteout (Oni Press)	
1999	Steven Seagle	"Drive By," Oni Double Feature (Oni Press), Sandman Mystery Theatre (DC/Vertigo)	
1999	Matt Wagner	Grendel: Black, White, and Red (Dark Horse)	
2000s
2000	Alan Moore	League of Extraordinary Gentlemen (ABC), Promethea (ABC), Tom Strong (ABC), Tomorrow Stories (ABC), Top Ten (ABC)	
2000	Ed Brubaker	Scene of the Crime (DC/Vertigo)	
2000	Warren Ellis	The Authority (DC/WildStorm), Planetary, (DC/WildStorm), Transmetropolitan (DC/Vertigo)	
2000	Mark Millar	Superman Adventures (DC)	
2000	Greg Rucka	Whiteout: Melt (Oni Press)	
2001	Alan Moore	League of Extraordinary Gentlemen (ABC), Promethea (ABC), Tom Strong (ABC), Tomorrow Stories (ABC), Top Ten (ABC)	
2001	Brian Michael Bendis	Powers (Image), Fortune and Glory (Oni Press), Ultimate Spider-Man (Marvel)	
2001	Mike Carey	Lucifer (DC/Vertigo)	
2001	Garth Ennis	Preacher (DC/Vertigo)	
2001	Mark Millar	The Authority (WildStorm), Ultimate X-Men (Marvel)	
2002	Brian Michael Bendis	Powers (Image), Alias (Marvel), Daredevil (Marvel), Ultimate Spider-Man (Marvel)	
2002	Brian Azzarello	100 Bullets (DC/Vertigo), Hellblazer (DC/Vertigo)	
2002	Grant Morrison	Fantastic Four: 1234 (Marvel), New X-Men (Marvel)	
2002	Greg Rucka	Queen & Country (Oni Press), Detective Comics (DC)	
2002	Mark Waid	Ruse (CrossGen)	
2003	Brian Michael Bendis	Powers (Image), Alias (Marvel), Daredevil (Marvel), Ultimate Spider-Man (Marvel)	
2003	Ed Brubaker	Catwoman (DC), Detective Comics (DC), Gotham Central (DC)	
2003	Bruce Jones	Incredible Hulk (Marvel)	
2003	Greg Rucka	Queen & Country (Oni Press), Gotham Central (DC), Wonder Woman: The Hiketeia (DC)	
2003	Bill Willingham	Fables (DC/Vertigo)	
2004	Alan Moore	League of Extraordinary Gentlemen (ABC), Promethea (ABC), Smax (ABC), Tom Strong (ABC), Tom Strong's Terrific Tales (ABC)	
2004	Brian Azzarello	100 Bullets (DC/Vertigo), Sgt. Rock: Between Hell and Hard Place (DC/Vertigo), Batman (DC)	
2004	Brian Michael Bendis	Alias (Marvel), Daredevil (Marvel), Ultimate Spider-Man (Marvel), Ultimate X-Men (Marvel), Powers (Image)	
2004	Ed Brubaker	Catwoman (DC), Detective Comics (DC), Gotham Central (DC), Sleeper (DC/WildStorm)	
2004	Warren Ellis	Orbiter (DC/Vertigo), Global Frequency, (DC/WildStorm), Red, (DC/WildStorm), Planetary, (DC/WildStorm), Planetary/Batman: Night on Earth, (DC/WildStorm)	
2004	Greg Rucka	Queen & Country (Oni Press), Gotham Central (DC), Wonder Woman (DC), Wolverine (Marvel)	
2005	Brian K. Vaughan	Y: The Last Man (DC/Vertigo), Ex Machina (DC/WildStorm), Runaways (Marvel)	
2005	Steve Niles	30 Days of Night: Return to Barrow (IDW), 30 Days of Night: Bloodsucker Tales (IDW), Aleister Arcane (IDW), Freaks of the Heartland (Dark Horse), Last Train to Deadsville (Dark Horse)	
2005	Greg Rucka	Queen & Country (Oni Press), Gotham Central (DC)	
2005	Joss Whedon	Astonishing X-Men (Marvel)	
2005	Bill Willingham	Fables (DC/Vertigo)	
2006	Alan Moore	Promethea (ABC), Top 10: The Forty-Niners (ABC)	
2006	Warren Ellis	Fell (Image), Down (Top Cow/Image), Desolation Jones (DC/WildStorm), Ocean (DC/WildStorm), Planetary, (DC/WildStorm)	
2006	Allan Heinberg	Young Avengers (Marvel)	
2006	Grant Morrison	Seven Soldiers (DC), All Star Superman (DC)	
2006	Brian K. Vaughan	Ex Machina (DC/WildStorm), Y: The Last Man (DC/Vertigo), Runaways (Marvel)	
2007	Ed Brubaker	Captain America (Marvel), Daredevil (Marvel), Criminal (Marvel/Icon)	
2007	Bob Burden	Gumby (Wildcard Ink)	
2007	Ian Edginton	Scarlet Traces: The Great Game (Dark Horse)	
2007	Grant Morrison	All Star Superman (DC), Batman (DC), 52 (DC), Seven Soldiers (DC)	
2007	Bill Willingham	Fables (DC/Vertigo), Jack of Fables (DC/Vertigo), Fables: 1001 Nights of Snowfall (DC/Vertigo)	
2008	Ed Brubaker	Captain America (Marvel), Criminal (Marvel/Icon), Daredevil (Marvel), The Immortal Iron Fist (Marvel)	
2008	James Sturm	Satchel Paige: Striking Out Jim Crow (Center for Cartoon Studies/Hyperion Books)	
2008	Brian K. Vaughan	Buffy the Vampire Slayer (Dark Horse), Ex Machina (DC/WildStorm), Y: The Last Man (DC/Vertigo)	
2008	Joss Whedon	Astonishing X-Men (Marvel), Buffy the Vampire Slayer (Dark Horse)	
2008	Brian Wood	DMZ (DC/Vertigo), Northlanders (DC/Vertigo), Local (Oni Press)	
2009	Bill Willingham	Fables (DC/Vertigo), House of Mystery (DC/Vertigo)	
2009	Joe Hill	Locke & Key (IDW)	
2009	J. Michael Straczynski	Thor (Marvel), The Twelve (Marvel)	
2009	Mariko Tamaki	Skim (Groundwood Books)	
2009	Matt Wagner	Zorro (Dynamite), Madame Xanadu (DC/Vertigo)	
2010s
2010	Ed Brubaker	Captain America (Marvel), Daredevil (Marvel), The Marvels Project (Marvel), Criminal (Marvel/Icon), Incognito (Marvel/Icon)	
2010	Geoff Johns	Adventure Comics (DC), Blackest Night (DC), The Flash: Rebirth (DC), Superman: Secret Origin (DC)	
2010	James Robinson	Justice League: Cry for Justice (DC)	
2010	Mark Waid	Irredeemable (Boom!), The Incredibles (Boom!)	
2010	Bill Willingham	Fables (DC/Vertigo)	
2011	Joe Hill	Locke & Key (IDW)	
2011	Ian Boothby	Comic Book Guy: The Comic Book (Bongo), Futurama Comics #47-50 (Bongo), Simpsons Comics #162, 168 (Bongo), Simpsons Super Spectacular #11-12 (Bongo)	
2011	John Layman	Chew (Image)	
2011	Jim McCann	Return of the Dapper Men (Archaia)	
2011	Nick Spencer	Morning Glories (Image), Shuddertown (Image), Forgetless (Image), Existence 3.0 (Image),	
2012	Mark Waid	Irredeemable (Boom!) Incorruptible (Boom!), Daredevil (Marvel)	
2012	Cullen Bunn	The Sixth Gun (Oni)	
2012	Mike Carey	The Unwritten (DC/Vertigo)	
2012	Jeff Jensen	Green River Killer: A True Detective Story (Dark Horse)	
2012	Jeff Lemire	Animal Man (DC), Flashpoint: Frankenstein and the Creatures of the Unknown (DC), Frankenstein: Agent of S.H.A.D.E. (DC), Sweet Tooth (DC/Vertigo)	
2013	Brian K. Vaughan	Saga (Image)	
2013	Ed Brubaker	Fatale (Image)	
2013	Matt Fraction	Hawkeye (Marvel), Casanova: Avaritia (Marvel/Icon)	
2013	Brandon Graham	Multiple Warheads (Image), Prophet (Image)	
2013	Jonathan Hickman	The Manhattan Projects (Image)	
2013	Frank M. Young	The Carter Family: Don't Forget This Song (Abrams ComicArts)	
2014	Brian K. Vaughan	Saga (Image)	
2014	Kelly Sue DeConnick	Pretty Deadly (Image), Captain Marvel (Marvel)	
2014	Matt Fraction	Sex Criminals (Image), Hawkeye (Marvel), Fantastic Four (Marvel), FF (Marvel)	
2014	Jonathan Hickman	East of West (Image), The Manhattan Projects (Image), Avengers (Marvel), Infinity (Marvel)	
2014	Eric Stephenson	Nowhere Men (Image)	
2015	Gene Luen Yang	Avatar: The Last Airbender (Dark Horse), The Shadow Hero (First Second)	
2015	Jason Aaron	Original Sin (Marvel), Thor (Marvel), Men of Wrath (Marvel/Icon), Southern Bastards (Image)	
2015	Kelly Sue DeConnick	Captain Marvel (Marvel), Pretty Deadly (Image)	
2015	Grant Morrison	The Multiversity (DC), Annihilator (Legendary Comics)	
2015	Brian K. Vaughan	Saga (Image), The Private Eye (Panel Syndicate)	
2015	G. Willow Wilson	Ms. Marvel (Marvel)	
2016	Jason Aaron	Southern Bastards (Image), Men of Wrath (Marvel/Icon), Doctor Strange (Marvel), Star Wars (Marvel), Thor (Marvel)	
2016	John Allison	Giant Days (Boom!)	
2016	Ed Brubaker	The Fade Out (Image), Velvet (Image), Criminal Special Edition (Image)	
2016	Marjorie Liu	Monstress (Image)	
2016	G. Willow Wilson	Ms. Marvel (Marvel)	
2017	Brian K. Vaughan	Paper Girls (Image), Saga (Image), We Stand On Guard (Image)	
2017	Ed Brubaker	Criminal 10th Anniversary Special (Image), Kill or Be Killed (Image), Velvet (Image)	
2017	Kurt Busiek	Astro City (DC/Vertigo)	
2017	Chelsea Cain	Mockingbird (Marvel)	
2017	Max Landis	Green Valley (Image/Skybound), Superman: American Alien (DC)	
2017	Jeff Lemire	Black Hammer (Dark Horse), Descender (Image), Plutona (Image), Bloodshot Reborn (Valiant)	
2018	Tom King (Note: There was a tie between Tom King and Marjorie Liu for best writer in 2018.)	Batman (DC), Batman Annual #2 (DC), Batman/Elmer Fudd Special #1 (DC), Mister Miracle (DC)	
2018	Marjorie Liu	Monstress (Image)	
2018	Matt Kindt	Grass Kings (Boom!), Ether (Dark Horse), Eternity (Valiant), X-O Manowar (Valiant)	
2018	Jeff Lemire	Black Hammer (Dark Horse), Descender (Image)	
2018	Mark Russell	The Flintstones (DC)	
2019	Tom King	Batman (DC), Mister Miracle (DC), Heroes in Crisis (DC), Swamp Thing Winter Special (DC)	
2019	Alex de Campi	Bad Girls (Gallery 13), Twisted Romance (Image)	
2019	Jeff Lemire	Black Hammer: Age of Doom (Dark Horse), Doctor Star & the Kingdom of Lost Tomorrows (Dark Horse), Quantum Age (Dark Horse), Descender (Image), Gideon Falls (Image), Royal City (Image)	
2019	Mark Russell	Exit, Stage Left!: The Snagglepuss Chronicles (DC), Green Lantern/Huckleberry Hound (DC), Lex Luthor/Porky Pig (DC), Lone Ranger (Dynamite)	
2019	Kelly Thompson	Nancy Drew (Dynamite), Hawkeye (Marvel), Jessica Jones (Marvel), Mr. & Mrs. X (Marvel), Rogue & Gambit (Marvel), Uncanny X-Men (Marvel), West Coast Avengers (Marvel)	
2019	Chip Zdarsky	Peter Parker: The Spectacular Spider-Man (Marvel), Marvel Two-in-One (Marvel)	
2020s
2020	Mariko Tamaki	Harley Quinn: Breaking Glass (DC), Laura Dean Keeps Breaking Up with Me (First Second/Macmillan), Archie (Archie)	
2020	Bobby Curnow	Ghost Tree (IDW)	
2020	MK Reed and Greg Means	Penny Nichols (Top Shelf)	
2020	Lewis Trondheim	Stay (Magnetic Press), Maggy Garrisson (SelfMadeHero)	
2020	G. Willow Wilson	Invisible Kingdom (Berger Books/Dark Horse), Ms. Marvel (Marvel)	
2020	Chip Zdarsky	The White Trees (Image), Daredevil (Marvel), Spider-Man: Life Story (Marvel), Afterlift (comiXology Originals)	
2021	James Tynion IV	Something Is Killing the Children (Boom!), Wynd (Boom!), Batman (DC), The Department of Truth (Image), Razorblades (Tiny Onion)	
2021	Ed Brubaker	Pulp (Image), Reckless (Image), Friday (Panel Syndicate)	
2021	Matt Fraction	Superman's Pal Jimmy Olsen (DC), Adventureman (Image), November vols. 2–3 (Image), Sex Criminals (Image)	
2021	Jonathan Hickman	Decorum (Image), Giant-Size X-Men (Marvel), X-Men (Marvel)	
2021	Jeff Lemire	Barbalien: Red Planet (Dark Horse), Black Hammer (Dark Horse), Colonel Weird: Cosmagog (Dark Horse), The Question: The Deaths of Vic Sage (DC), Family Tree (Image), Gideon Falls (Image)	
2021	Chip Zdarsky	Stillwater (Image/Skybound), Daredevil (Marvel), Fantastic Four/X-Men (Marvel)	
2022	James Tynion IV	House of Slaughter (Boom!), Something Is Killing the Children (Boom!), Wynd (Boom!), The Nice House on the Lake (DC), The Joker (DC), Batman (DC), DC Pride (DC), The Department of Truth (Image), Blue Book (Tiny Onion Studios), Razorblades (Tiny Onion Studios)	
2022	Ed Brubaker	Destroy All Monsters (Image), Friend of the Devil (Image)	
2022	Kelly Sue DeConnick	Wonder Woman Historia: The Amazons (DC)	
2022	Filipe Melo	Ballad for Sophie (Top Shelf)	
2022	Ram V	The Many Deaths of Laila Starr (Boom!), The Swamp Thing (DC), Carnage: Black, White & Blood (Marvel), Venom (Marvel)	
2023	James Tynion IV	House of Slaughter (Boom!), Something Is Killing the Children (Boom!), Wynd (Boom!), The Nice House on the Lake (DC), The Sandman Universe: Nightmare Country (DC), The Closet (Image)The Department of Truth (Image)	
2023	Grace Ellis	Flung Out Of Space (Abrams Comicsart)	
2023	Tom King	Batman: Killing Time (DC), Batman: One Bad Day (DC), Gotham City: Year One (DC), The Human Target (DC), Supergirl: The Woman of Tomorrow (DC), Love Everlasting (Image)	
2023	Mark Russell	Traveling To Mars (Ablaze), One-Star Squadron (DC), Superman: Space Age (DC), The Incal: Psychoverse (Humanoids)	
2023	Chip Zdarsky	Stillwater (Image Skybound), Daredevil (Marvel)	
2024	Mariko Tamaki	Roaming (Drawn & Quarterly)	
2024	Stephen Graham Jones	EarthDivers (IDW)	
2024	Tom Taylor	Nightwing, Titans (DC)	
2024	Kelly Thompson	Birds of Prey, Harley Quinn: Black White and Redder (DC), Black Cloak, The Cull (Image), It's Jeff, Captain Marvel (Marvel)	
2024	Mark Waid	Batman/Superman: World's Finest, Shazam!, World's Finest: Teen Titans (DC)	
2024	G. Willow Wilson	Poison Ivy (DC), Hunger and the Dusk (IDW)	
2025	Gene Luen Yang	Lunar New Year Love Story (First Second/Macmillan)	
2025	Tom King	The Decision (Archie), Animal Pound (BOOM!), Helen of Wyndhorn (Dark Horse), Jenny Sparks, The Penguin, Wonder Woman (DC)	
2025	Ram V	Rare Flavours (BOOM!), Dawnrunner (Dark Horse), The One Hand (Image), Universal Monsters: Creature from the Black Lagoon Lives! (Image Skybound)	
2025	Kelly Thompson	Absolute Wonder Woman, Birds of Prey (DC); Scarlett (Image Skybound); Venom War: It's Jeff #1 (Marvel)	
2025	James Tynion IV	Something Is Killing the Children, Wynd (BOOM!), Blue Book, The Oddly Pedestrian Life of Christopher Chaos (Dark Horse), Spectregraph (DSTLRY), The Department of Truth, The Deviant, WORLDTR33 (Image)	
2026	Mariko Tamaki	This Place Kills Me (Abrams Fanfare)	
2026	Deniz Camp	Absolute Martian Manhunter (DC), Assorted Crisis Events (Image), The Ultimates (Marvel)	
2026	Scott Snyder	Absolute Batman, Batman/Deadpool (DC); By a Thread: Book 2 (Comixology Originals), You Won't Feel a Thing (DSTLRY)	
2026	Kelly Thompson	Absolute Wonder Woman, Birds of Prey (DC), Jeff the Land Shark (Marvel)	
2026	James Tynion IV	Something Is Killing the Children, Wynd: The Power of the Blood (BOOM!), Let This One Be a Devil, Red Book (Dark Horse), The City Beneath Her Feet (DSTLRY); The Department of Truth, Exquisite Corpses, W0RLDTR33 (Image), Universal Monsters: The Invisible Man (Image Skybound)	
2026	Stephanie Williams	Street Sharks (IDW Publishing), Roots of Madness (Ignition Press), Temporal (Mad Cave Studios)	

== Multiple awards and nominations ==
The following individuals have won Best Writer one or more times:

Writer	Wins	Nominations
Alan Moore	9	13
Brian K. Vaughan	4	7
Neil Gaiman	4	6
Ed Brubaker	3	10
Mariko Tamaki	3	4
James Tynion IV	3	3
Brian Michael Bendis	2	4
Tom King	2	3
Garth Ennis	1	5
Kurt Busiek	1	5
Bill Willingham	1	5
Mark Waid	1	4
Joe Hill	1	2
Jason Aaron	1	2
Marjorie Liu	1	2
Gene Luen Yang	1	1

=== Most nominations without a win ===
Writer	Nominations
Grant Morrison	8
Greg Rucka	6
Jeff Lemire	5
Dave Sim	4
James Robinson	4
Chip Zdarsky	4
Matt Wagner	3
Warren Ellis	3
G. Willow Wilson	3
Matt Fraction	3
Jonathan Hickman	3
Kelly Thompson	3
Mike Baron	2
Scott McCloud	2
Frank Miller	2
Peter Bagge	2
Harvey Pekar	2
John Ostrander	2
Mark Millar	2
Mike Carey	2
Brian Azzarello	2
Joss Whedon	2
Kelly Sue DeConnick	2
Mark Russell	2

== See also ==
- Eisner Award for Best Publication for Early Readers
- Eisner Award for Best Academic/Scholarly Work
- Eisner Award for Best Cover Artist
- Eisner Award for Best Coloring
- Eisner Award for Best Lettering
