= Laura Dean =

Laura Dean may refer to:

- Laura Dean (choreographer), American dancer, choreographer and composer
- Laura Dean (actress), American film and television actress and voice actress
- Laura Dean, title character of Laura Dean Keeps Breaking Up with Me, American graphic novel
- Laura Dean, Marvel Comics character known as Pathway
