= The Deviant =

2023 horror comic book miniseries

- Cover art for The Deviant Vol. 2

Publication information
- Publisher: Image Comics
- Schedule: Monthly (irregular)
- Format: Limited series
- Genre: Christmas horror Crime
- Publication date: November 2023 – March 2025
- No. of issues: 9

Creative team
- Written by: James Tynion IV
- Artist: Joshua Hixson
- Letterer: Hassan Otsmane-Elhaou

Collected editions
- The Deviant Vol. 1: ISBN 978-1534356917
- The Deviant Vol. 2: ISBN 978-1534374270

The Deviant is a comic book limited series by writer James Tynion IV and artist Joshua Hixson. Lettering was done by Hassan Otsmane-Elahaou. It was published monthly by Image Comics from 2023 to 2025. The series received critical acclaim, receiving nominations for both Best Writer and Best Limited Series at the 2025 Eisner Awards. Horror News Network named it its series of the year.

The title of the series is a reference to the historical classification of homosexuality as sexual deviancy.

== Premise ==
In 1972, a serial killer dressed as Santa Claus kills several young men in Milwaukee. Years later, a comic book writer approaches the incarcerated accused killer with the goal of writing a story about their shared identities, only for a new copycat killer to emerge.

== Characters ==
- Michael, a comic book author with an interest in serial killers
- Derek, a nurse and Michael's boyfriend
- Randall Olsen, an elderly pedophile accused of being The Deviant Killer
- Paul, a homophobic retired police officer who initially discovered the bodies of the vicitms
- Agent Hall, an FBI investigator tasked with finding the copycat killer.

== Publication history ==
In August, 2023, Image Comics announced The Deviant as a nine issue "holiday horror story" miniseries set to launch in November of the same year. In the press release, Tynion described the series a response to "The Silence of the Lambs and Jeffrey Dahmer serving as [his] first real glimpses of [his] queer identity as a young closeted Midwestern boy."

Key inspirations for the series include the works of David Fincher and Thomas Harris.

The debut issue of The Deviant was published on November 15, 2023. The ninth and final issue was published on March 19, 2025.

== Reception ==
Robert Mammone writing for Grimdark Magazine gave the first issue a rating of 5/5, praising Tynion's writing and Hixson's artwork. He further compared the relationship of Randall and Michael to that of Clarice Starling and Hannibal Lecter from The Silence of the Lambs. ComicsBeat described the first issue as having the makings of a "perennial horror book".

== Collected Editions ==
| Title | Material collected | Pages | Released | ISBN |
|---|---|---|---|---|
| The Deviant Vol. 1 | The Deviant #1-4 | 152 | October 16, 2024 | 978-1534356917 |
| The Deviant Vol. 2 | The Deviant #5-9 | 144 | May 14, 2025 | 978-1534374270 |

A deluxe hardcover single-volume edition of the series is set to be released on November 4, 2026.
