= James Tynion IV =

American comic book writer

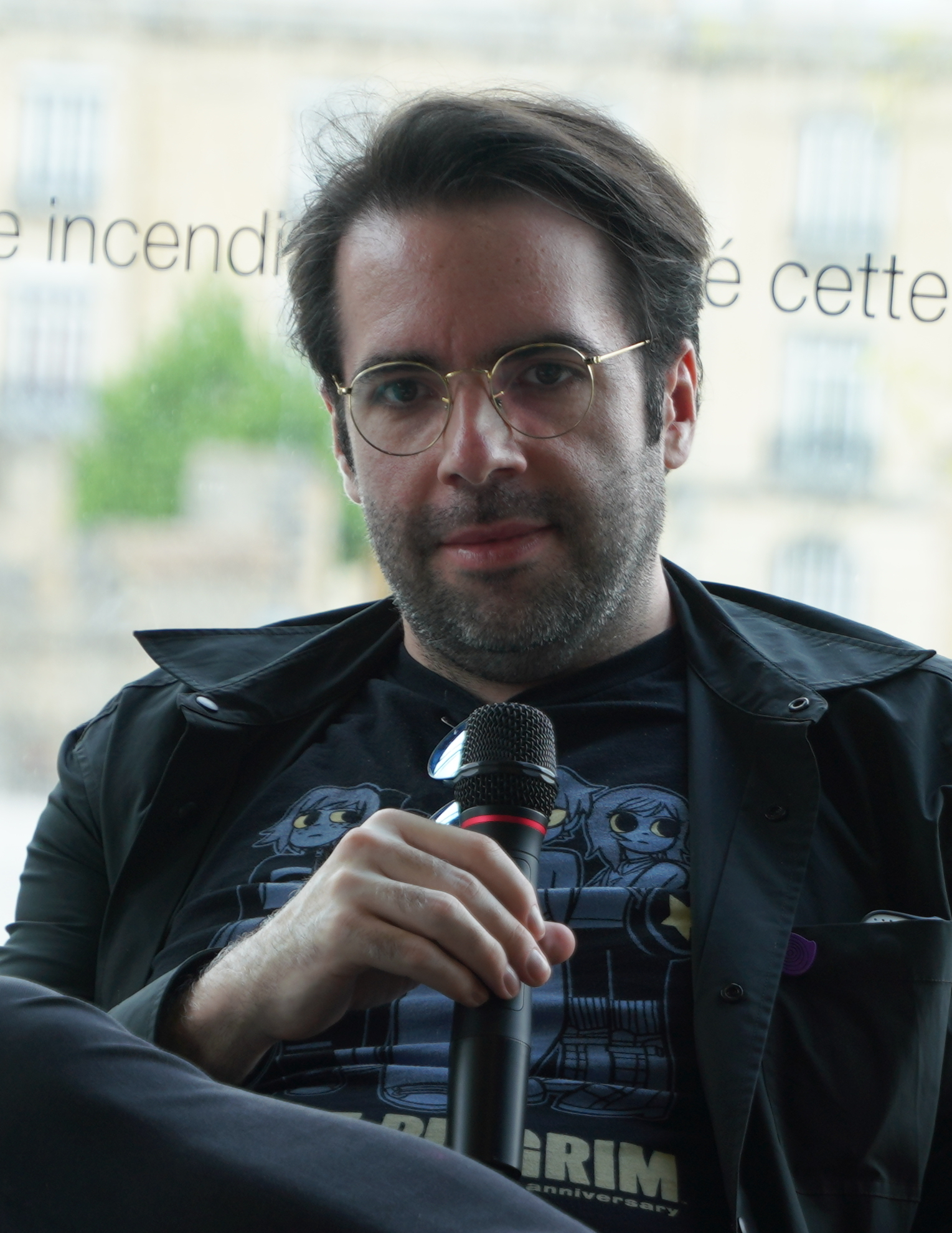
- Tynion in Le Mans, France, in April 2025
- Born: James T. Tynion IV; December 14, 1987 (age 38) New York, New York, U.S.
- Area: Writer
- Notable works: Something Is Killing The Children; The Department of Truth; Batman; The Nice House… The Woods; The Deviant

James T. Tynion IV (/ˈtaɪnən/; born December 14, 1987) is an American comic book writer. He is best known for his work at DC Comics including as the writer on Batman, the Batman/Teenage Mutant Ninja Turtles trilogy, and Justice League Dark volume 2.

He is also known for his creator-owned DC Black Label series The Nice House... and his independent series The Department of Truth, W0rldtr33, Something Is Killing the Children, Memetic, and The Woods.

In 2022, he won three Eisner Awards for his work. In all, he has won five Eisner Awards. He is also a ten-time nominee for the GLAAD Media Award for Outstanding Comic Book, the most nominations of any writer, winning once in 2016.

== Early life ==
James Tynion IV was born December 14, 1987, and grew up in Milwaukee, Wisconsin, where he attended Marquette University High School. While studying creative writing at Sarah Lawrence College, Tynion met and began studying under Scott Snyder, in the nascent years of his comic book writing career. Following school, he became an intern for DC Comics' Vertigo imprint, working under Editor Shelly Bond, among others.

== Career ==
After a brief stint in advertising, Tynion was asked by Scott Snyder to co-write the back-up features for the New 52 relaunch of Batman, beginning with the acclaimed "Night of the Owls" storyline. These features would lead to the launch of a spin-off comic book Talon, co-plotted with Snyder and written by Tynion. In 2013, Tynion released his first original comic series, The Eighth Seal, for Mark Waid's digital comic publisher Thrillbent. Tynion would go on to be one of the head writers of Batman Eternal, a weekly Batman comic series launched in 2014 that was designed to explore the full scope and cast of Gotham City. That same year, he released the GLAAD Media Award-nominated comic title Memetic with artist Eryk Donovan and Award-winning The Woods with Michael Dialynas at Boom Studios. Adaptations of both series are currently in development. In 2016, Tynion's partnership with Boom continued with the PRISM Award-winning comic title The Backstagers, as well as at DC via the first of three Batman/Teenage Mutant Ninja Turtles comic book crossovers with DC and IDW Publishing, the first ever meeting between the two franchises.

That same year, Tynion was announced as the writer of the biweekly Detective Comics for DC's Rebirth initiative. In 2018, Tynion launched an acclaimed revival of the comic Justice League Dark, which led into the Wonder Woman crossover storyline "The Witching Hour." The following year, he launched the Eisner-winning and Harvey-nominated comic book mini-series Something is Killing the Children, which was later upgraded to an ongoing title due to high demand. A Netflix series adaptation by Mike Flanagan and Trevor Macy is currently in development. In 2020, Tynion was announced as the writer of the main Batman comic title, where he would go on to co-create characters like Punchline, Ghost-Maker, Clownhunter, and Miracle Molly. That July, he premiered the self-published horror magazine Razorblades. and on September 30 that year, he launched the Eisner and Harvey-nominated The Department of Truth at Image, The film and television rights to The Department of Truth were purchased by Sister, the production banner co-founded by Elisabeth Murdoch, Stacey Snider, and Jane Featherstone, in February 2021.

In 2021, Tynion launched two Eisner Award-nominated comic titles–the first volume of the graphic novel series Wynd at Boom, and the Eisner-winning The Nice House on the Lake at DC Black Label.

2021 also marked Tynion's first Eisner Award for Best Writer. That same year, Tynion and Boom announced a spin-off comic to Something is Killing the Children titled House of Slaughter, co-written with Tate Brombal (and later with Sam Johns), which launched to record numbers. 2021 would also see Tynion leave his exclusive contract with DC and be offered a grant from Substack to launch a slate of original creator-owned comic titles directly on their platform, with the first being the ongoing comic Blue Book with artist Michael Avon Oeming.

In August 2021, Tynion was among a group of creators with whom fellow comics writer Nick Spencer formed a deal with the subscription-based newsletter platform Substack to publish creator-owned comics stories, essays, and instructional guides. Tynion indicated that he would end his tenure on the Batman books in order to concentrate his time on his Substack newsletter, which would include Blue Book, a nonfiction series illustrated by Michael Avon Oeming, and based on accounts of alien encounters and the supernatural, to premiere in February 2023. The series would be released in ten page chapters, twice a month, on Fridays. The first chapter would depict the 1961 Barney and Betty Hill incident, in which the Hills stated that they were abducted from the White Mountains in New Hampshire by aliens. In October 2023, it was announced that a second chapter, titled Blue Book: 1947, which focuses on new characters, was scheduled to be published in February 2024.

In February 2022, Tynion launched on Substack two ongoing comics series: The Oddly Pedestrian Life of Christopher Chaos, which is written by Tate Brombal, and based on an idea by Tynion; True Weird, and the limited comic series The Closet, which would later be re-published by Image Comics. That April, Tynion launched The Sandman Universe: Nightmare Country, a spin-off of the Vertigo comic book The Sandman. That November, it was reported that Tynion had partnered with Dark Horse Comics to release print versions of Tiny Onion's Substack books, as well as original stories.

Tynion contributed to the comic anthology The Devil's Cut, which was published by the publishing startup DSTLRY in 2023. He also began a new horror series for Image, entitled W0rldtr33, with artist Fernando Blanco, with publication beginning in April 2023.

On February 16, 2024, Tynion announced that he was creating a new production studio called Tiny Onion in collaboration with Lyrical Media who had invested seven figures in the studio. The purpose of the new studio as outlined by Tynion will be to aid in "the development, packaging, marketing and cross-platform promotion of new creator-owned work" as well as "be a springboard for new creator-owned IP to spread beyond comics into film, gaming and even animation."

In 2026, he signed a first-look deal with Blumhouse Atomic Partners to adapt comic properties into feature films and television projects.

== Personal life ==
James Tynion IV is openly gay.

== Bibliography ==
=== Boom Studios ===
- WYND Book Three: The Throne in the Sky graphic novel (with Michael Dialynas, 2023)
- WYND Book Two: The Secret of the Wings graphic novel (with Michael Dialynas, 2022)
- WYND Book One: The Flight of the Prince graphic novel (with Michael Dialynas, 2021)
- House of Slaughter #1–present (co-written by Tate Brombal, Sam Johns, with Werther Dell'Edera, Chris Shehan, Letizia Cadonici, 2021–present)
- Something Is Killing the Children #1–present (with Werther Dell'Edera, 2019–present)
- The Backstagers 2018 Halloween Intermission (with Rian Sygh, 2018)
- The Backstagers 2018 Valentine's Intermission (with Rian Sygh, 2018)
- Eugenic #1–3 (with Eryk Donovan, 2017)
- The Backstagers #1–8 (with Rian Sygh, 2016–2017)
- Cognetic #1–3 (with Eryk Donovan, 2015)
- UFOlogy #1–6 (co-written by Noah James Yuenkel, art by Matt Fox, 2015)
- The Woods #1–36 (with Michael Dialynas, 2014–2017)
- Memetic #1–3 (with Eryk Donovan, 2014)
- Bravest Warriors: Paralyzed Horse Special (with Erica Henderson, 2014)

=== DC Comics ===
- Batman vol. 2 #8–16, 18–25, 28, 35–39, 49, 52, Annual #1, 3–4 (2012–2016)
- Batman vol. 3 #85–117, Annual 2020, 2021 (2020–2021)
- Batman and Robin vol. 2 #23.2, 23.3 (2013)
- Batman and Robin Eternal #1–26 (2015–2016)
- Batman Black and White #1 (2020)
- Batman Eternal #1–52 (2014–2015)
- Batman: Fear State Alpha #1 (2021)
- Batman: Fear State Omega #1 (2021)
- Batman: The Joker War Zone #1 (2020)
- Batman: Lost #1 (2018)
- Batman: Pennyworth R.I.P. #1 (2020)
- Batman Secret Files #3 (2020)
- Batman Secret Files: The Gardener #1 (2021)
- Batman Secret Files: Miracle Molly #1 (2021)
- Batman Secret Files: Peacekeeper-01 #1 (2021)
- Batman/Teenage Mutant Ninja Turtles #1–6 (2016)
- Batman/Teenage Mutant Ninja Turtles II #1–6 (2018)
- Batman/Teenage Mutant Ninja Turtles III #1–6 (2019)
- The Batman Who Laughs #1 (2018)
- The Batman Who Laughs: The Grim Hunt #1 (2019)
- Batwoman vol. 3 #1–6 (2017)
- Batwoman: Rebirth #1 (2017)
- Constantine: The Hellblazer #1–13 (2015–2016)
- Cursed Comics Cavalcade #1 (2018)
- Dark Days: The Casting #1 (2017)
- Dark Days: The Forge #1 (2017)
- Dark Knights Rising: The Wild Hunt #1 (2018)
- Dark Nights: Death Metal Guidebook #1 (2020)
- Dark Nights: Death Metal - Legends of the Dark Knights #1 (2020)
- Dark Nights: Death Metal - Multiverse's End #1 (2020)
- Dark Nights: Death Metal - The Multiverse Who Laughs #1 (2021)
- Dark Nights: Death Metal - Rise of the New God #1 (2020)
- DC Nation vol. 2 #0 (2018)
- DC Pride 2021 #1 (2021)
- DC Rebirth Holiday Special #1 (2017)
- DC vs Vampires #1-12 (2021-2022)
- DC's Crimes of Passion #1 (2020)
- DC's Year of the Villain Special #1 (2019)
- Detective Comics #934–981, 1000, 1027, Annual #1 (2016–2020)
- Detective Comics vol. 2 #0, 12, 19 (2012)
- Gotham Academy #16 (2016)
- Green Lantern 80th Anniversary 100-Page Super Spectacular #1 (2020)
- The Immortal Men #1–6 (2018)
- Infinite Frontier #0 (2021)
- The Joker vol. 2 #1–15 (2021–2022), Annual 2021
- The Joker 80th Anniversary 100-Page Super Spectacular #1 (2020)
- Justice League vol. 4 #5, 8, 12–16, 18, 22, 25–35, Annual #1 (2018–2020)
- Justice League/Aquaman: The Drowned Earth #1
- Justice League Dark vol. 2 #1–23, Annual #1 (2018–2020)
- Justice League Dark/Wonder Woman: The Witching Hour #1 (2018)
- Justice League: No Justice #1–4 (2018)
- The Kamandi Challenge #4 (2017)
- Legend of the Swamp Thing Halloween Special #1 (2020)
- Mysteries of Love in Space #1 (2019)
- Punchline #1 (2021)
- Red Hood and the Outlaws #19–28, Annual #1 (2013–2014)
- Robin 80th Anniversary 100-Page Super Spectacular #1 (2020)
- Tales from the Dark Multiverse: Infinite Crisis #1 (2020)
- Talon #0–14 (2012–2014)
- The Sandman Universe: Nightmare Country #1–6 (2022)
- The Nice House #1–present (2021–present)
- Wonder Woman vol. 5 #56–57 (2018)
- Wonder Woman/Justice League Dark: The Witching Hour #1 (2018)
- Year of the Villain: Hell Arisen #1–4 (2020)

=== DSTLRY ===
- Spectregraph #1–4 (2024)
- The City Beneath Her Feet #1–present (2024–present)

=== IDW Publishing ===
- Love is Love ("Pride" short, with Lee Knox Ostertag, 2016)
- In The Dark: A Horror Anthology ("Why So Sad" short, with Eryk Donovan, 2014)

=== Image Comics ===
- The Closet #1–3 (with Gavin Fullerton, 2022)
- The Department of Truth #1–present (with Martin Simmonds, 2020–present)
- The Silver Coin #11 (with Michael Walsh, 2022)
- Image! #8 ("W0RLDTR33" with Fernando Blanco, 2022)
- Universal Monsters: Dracula #1–4 (with Martin Simmonds, 2023-2024)
- W0RLDTR33 #1–present (with Fernando Blanco, 2023–present)
- The Deviant #1–9 (with Joshua Hixson, 2024)
- Exquisite Corpses #1–present (with Michael Walsh, 2025–present)

=== Marvel Comics ===
- Death of Wolverine: Logan's Legacy #6 (with Andy Clarke, 2014)
- Amazing X-Men #13 (with Jorge Jimenez, 2014)

=== Thrillbent ===
- The Eighth Seal (with Jeremy Rock, 2013–2014)
- The House In The Wall (co-written by Noah J. Yuenkel, art by Eryk Donovan, 2014)

=== Tiny Onion Studios ===
- Blue Book #1–present (with Michael Avon Oeming, 2021–present; re-published by Dark Horse Comics)
- The Oddly Pedestrian Life of Christopher Chaos #1–present (co-written by Tate Brombal, with Isaac Goodhart, Miquel Muerto, Nick Robles, 2022–present; re-published by Dark Horse Comics)
- Razorblades: The Horror Magazine #1–5 (with Ricardo Lopez Ortiz, Andy Belanger, Martin Simmonds, Fernando Blanco, Josh Hixson, Liana Kangas, 2020–2021)
- True Weird ("Coney Island" with Klaus Janson, 2022)

== Awards and nominations ==
=== Wins ===
- 2023 Eisner Award for Best Writer for "House of Slaughter," "Something Is Killing the Children," "The Nice House on the Lake," "The Sandman Universe: Nightmare Country," "The Closet," "The Department of Truth"
- 2022 Eisner Award for Best New Series for "The Nice House on the Lake"
- 2022 Eisner Award for Best Continuing Series for "Something is Killing the Children"
- 2022 Eisner Award for Best Writer for "The Department of Truth", "The Nice House on the Lake", "Something is Killing the Children", "Wynd"
- 2022 Ringo Award for Best Writer
- 2022 Ringo Award for Best Series for "Something is Killing the Children"
- 2022 Ringo Award for Best Single Issue or Story for "Something is Killing the Children #20"
- 2021 Eisner Award for Best Writer for Something Is Killing the Children (Boom!), Wynd (Boom!), Batman (DC), The Department of Truth (Image), Razorblades (Tiny Onion)
- 2021 Ringo Award for Best Writer
- 2017 Diamond Gem Award for Licensed TP/HC of the Year for "Batman/TMNT Vol. 1"
- 2017 PRISM Award for Best Single Issue From A Mainstream Publisher for "The Backstagers #1"
- 2016 GLAAD Media Award for Outstanding Comic Book for "The Woods"

=== Nominations ===
- 2025 Eisner Award for Best Writer for "Something Is Killing the Children", "Wynd", and "The Oddly Pedestrian Life of Christopher Chaos"
- 2025 Eisner Award for Best Continuing Series for "The Department of Truth"
- 2025 Eisner Award for Best Limited Series for "The Deviant"
- 2025 GLAAD Media Award for Outstanding Comic Book for "The Nice House by the Sea"
- 2025 GLAAD Media Award for Outstanding Comic Book for "Spectregraph"
- 2023 GLAAD Media Award for Outstanding Comic Book for "The Nice House on the Lake"
- 2023 GLAAD Media Award for Outstanding Comic Book for "Wynd: The Throne in the Sky"
- 2022 Eisner Award for Best Continuing Series for "The Department of Truth"
- 2022 Eisner Award for Best Publication for Teens (Age 13-17) for "Wynd"
- 2022 GLAAD Media Award for Outstanding Comic Book for "Wynd"
- 2022 Harvey Award for Book of the Year for "The Department of Truth Vol 3: Free Country"
- 2022 Harvey Award for Book of the Year for "The Nice House on the Lake"
- 2021 Eisner Award for Best New Series for "The Department of Truth"
- 2021 Eisner Award for Best Continuing Series for "The Department of Truth"
- 2021 GLAAD Media Award for Outstanding Comic Book for "Wynd"
- 2021 Harvey Award for Book of the Year for "The Department of Truth"
- 2021 Ringo Award for Best Series for "The Department of Truth"
- 2020 Harvey Award for Book of the Year for "Something is Killing the Children, Vol. 1"
- 2020 Eisner Award for Best New Series for "Something is Killing the Children"
- 2020 Ringo Award for Best Series for "Something is Killing the Children"
- 2017 GLAAD Media Award for Outstanding Comic Book for "The Woods"
- 2017 GLAAD Media Award for Outstanding Comic Book for "The Backstagers"
- 2017 GLAAD Media Award for Outstanding Comic Book for "Batwoman"
- 2015 GLAAD Media Award for Outstanding Comic Book for "Memetic"

Preceded by Peter Tomasi	Detective Comics writer 2015–2016	Succeeded by Bryan Edward Hill
Preceded by Tom King	Batman writer 2020–2021	Succeeded by Joshua Williamson
