= The Woods (comic) =

Comic book by James Tynion IV and Michael Dialynas

- Cover of the first printing of issue #1, published in May 2014.

Publication information
- Publisher: Boom! Studios
- Schedule: Monthly/bimonthly (irregular)
- Format: Ongoing series
- Publication date: May 2014 – October 2017
- No. of issues: 36
- Main character(s): Isaac Andrews; Karen Jacobs; Calder McCready; Sanami Ota; Maria Ramirez; Adrian Roth; Benjamin Stone

Creative team
- Written by: James Tynion IV
- Artist(s): Michael Dialynas

Collected editions
- The Arrow: ISBN 978-160886-4546
- The Swarm: ISBN 978-160886-4959
- New London: ISBN 978-160886-7738
- Movie Night: ISBN 978-160886-8223
- The Horde: ISBN 978-160886-8575
- The Lost: ISBN 978-160886-9435
- The Black City: ISBN 978-160886-9893
- The Final War: ISBN 978-168415-0403
- The Way Home: ISBN 978-168415-1271

The Woods is a serialized graphic novel written by James Tynion IV, with art by Michael Dialynas. In the story, more than 500 students, faculty, and staff from a Midwestern preparatory school vanish from Earth, and reappear on the forested moon of a planet in another star system.

The Woods was published by Boom! Studios in 36 issues, from May 2014 to October 2017. Distributors bought every copy of the first issue the day it was made available for wholesale purchase; Boom Studios! issued a second printing with a slightly different cover design. The entire series was later anthologized in nine volumes, which Boom! Studios published from September 2014 to March 2018.

Honours for The Woods include "Best Graphic Novel for Young Adults" (YALSA, 2016) and the GLAAD Media Award for Outstanding Comic Book (2017).

== Plot ==
The story begins at a college-preparatory school in the suburbs of Milwaukee, Wisconsin, a city in the Midwestern United States. From there, 513 people—including 437 students, 52 teachers, and 24 staff—disappear on the date October 16, 2013. They reappear on a forest-covered moon in an uncharted part of the universe.

The story follows seven students in particular: Isaac Andrews, Karen Jacobs, Calder McCready, Sanami Ota, Maria Ramirez, Adrian Roth, and Benjamin Stone.

== Illustration ==
After James Tynion wrote The Woods, Boom Studios helped to find an artist to draw the comic. "We were looking at a bunch of people, but when I saw Michael [Dialynas]' character work, it made me see… the characters in my head, and they had come to life in a way that was wholly them, and in that moment, it was a no brainer," Tynion said. Among Dialynas' previous illustration credits are Amala's Blade (Dark Horse Comics, 2012), Trinkets: An Attic Full of Stories (Comicdom Press, 2011), and Swan Songs: Fleeting Feathers (Comicdom Press, 2010).

== Collected editions ==
The series was originally published in nine volumes that cover the three years the characters are on the forested moon.

Title	Material Collected	Format	Pages	Publication Date	ISBN
The Woods, Volume 1: The Arrow	The Woods #1-4	Trade Paperback	96	September 23, 2014	ISBN 9781608864546
The Woods, Volume 2: The Swarm	The Woods #5-8	Trade Paperback	112	May 12, 2015	ISBN 9781608864959
The Woods, Volume 3: New London	The Woods #9-12	Trade Paperback	112	January 19, 2016	ISBN 9781608867738
The Woods, Volume 4: Movie Night	The Woods #13-16	Trade Paperback	112	June 7, 2016	ISBN 9781608868223
The Woods, Volume 5: The Horde	The Woods #17-20	Trade Paperback	112	November 8, 2016	ISBN 9781608868575
The Woods, Volume 6: The Lost	The Woods #21-24	Trade Paperback	112	April 25, 2017	ISBN 9781608869435
The Woods, Volume 7: The Black City	The Woods #25-28	Trade Paperback	112	July 11, 2017	ISBN 9781608869893
The Woods, Volume 8: The Final War	The Woods #29-32	Trade Paperback	112	December 5, 2017	ISBN 9781684150403
The Woods, Volume 9: The Way Home	The Woods #33-36	Trade Paperback	112	March 20, 2018	ISBN 9781684151271

The nine volumes were also collected into three "Yearbook" editions.

Title	Material Collected	Format	Pages	Publication Date	ISBN
The Woods Yearbook Edition: Book One	The Woods, Volume #1-3	Trade Paperback	304	May 14, 2019	ISBN 9781684153640
The Woods Yearbook Edition: Book Two	The Woods, Volume #4-6	Trade Paperback	240	August 13, 2019	ISBN 9781684153923
The Woods Yearbook Edition: Book Three	The Woods, Volume #7-9	Trade Paperback	304	December 3, 2019	ISBN 9781684154685

== Reception ==
In 2016, the Young Adult Library Services Association named The Woods the "Best Graphic Novel for Young Adults" of the year. In 2017, GLAAD awarded Tynion the GLAAD Media Award for Outstanding Comic Book for his work on The Woods. The Woods was renominated in 2018; that year, it was one of three Tynion stories to be nominated.

== Television adaptation ==
In December 2016, US television channel Syfy was announced to have begun developing a series based on the comic, but the project stalled. The screen adaptation was written by Michael Armbruster, with episodes set to be produced and directed by Brad Peyton.
