= This One Summer =

2014 graphic novel by Mariko and Jilian Tamaki

- Author: Mariko Tamaki
- Illustrator: Jillian Tamaki
- Language: English
- Genre: Graphic Novel
- Published: 2014
- Publisher: First Second
- Publication place: United States
- Pages: 320
- ISBN: 9781626720947

This One Summer is a graphic novel written by Mariko Tamaki and illustrated by Jillian Tamaki published by First Second Books in 2014. It is a coming of age story about two teenage friends, Rose and Windy, during a summer in Awago, a small beach town. Rose and Windy discover themselves and their sexuality while battling family dynamics and mental disabilities.

Due to the content in the novel, This One Summer has also been censored and listed on the American Library Association's "Top Ten Most Challenged Books" list in 2016 and 2018 for the use of its sexual scenes and mature topics. The novel has also won numerous awards including a Caldecott Honor in 2015. In 2023, a film adaptation was released starring Rose Pou-Pellicer, Juliette Havelange, Marina Foïs, Gael García Bernal, Chiara Mastroianni and directed by Éric Lartigau.

== Background ==
The author of This One Summer, Mariko Tamaki, decided to begin her writing career when she was writing essays for Kiss Machine. While on tour for Kiss Machine, she met a woman making a short comic book series who inspired her to begin the novel, Skim. Skim was eventually selected by a young adult publisher and thus began Mariko's profession as a young adult novelist. Throughout each of her pieces of literature, author and feminist Mariko Tamaki finds equity and representation important for her works as seen in Skim and (You) Set Me on Fire. Both of these novels contain Asian protagonists, which she found important because "there are diverse experiences of race" and she wanted other young Asians to grow up with more novels to read about young Asian girls rather than just Obasan. Mariko's cousin and illustrator of This One Summer, Jillian Tamaki, has also worked on previous novels with her including Skim. Jillian Tamaki also understands the importance of diversity and setting a "positive example" of race and gender because it is "not [her] interest to do any of that pedantic stuff."

== Plot ==
Rose has been coming to a cottage in Awago every summer and meeting her summer friend, Windy, as long as she can remember. Rose is about eighteen months older than Windy and is the narrator of the story. This summer, they start to explore their interest in boys and pay attention to the emotional lives of adults around them. Most of the adults and teenagers in the village (and in their families) are a "rogues' gallery of sad and burnt-out would-be role models." This is emphasized as Rose also begins to realize her mother, Alice, is depressed following her infertility issues. Rose becomes more and more troubled as the summer wears on and yells at Alice one night, blaming her for constantly refusing to go to the beach and arguments with her husband, Evan (which led to him leaving for the city for several days). One of the people Rose and Windy meet at Awago includes Jenny, a teenager who has accidentally become pregnant. After Jenny has an argument with the father of her child—who has ignored her and the baby since it was discovered—she becomes drunk and Alice saves her from attempting to drown herself. The novel concludes when she and Windy's mother recount the main cause of Alice's marital and emotional troubles (and her refusal to go to the beach): her miscarriage in a lake last summer in Awago.

== Genre/Style ==
This One Summer is a graphic novel with dark purple and purple blue images surrounding the dialogue. In a Room Magazine interview with illustrator Jillian Tamaki and author Mariko Tamaki, the cousins describe their process of making a graphic novel by explaining, "She writes out the dialogue like how a play would be, and I do a sketch of the whole book." When asked about her choice of color, Jillian thought on a superficial level it looked cool but also seemed neutral while providing an emotional feeling in a different sensory reaction. Scholar Meryl Jaffe has praised the artwork in the novel and claims the art and story are perfectly juxtaposed to make the reader believe the characters are real while furthering the themes in the novel. Furthermore, Meryl Jaffe noted the illustrations of summer night skies and moonlight make breathtaking scenes while contrasted with less detailed characters. The illustrations in the novel also have the potential of having the reader feel the crunch of leaves and the heat of summer while viewing the illustrations.

== Analysis ==
Many reviews suggest that This One Summer inspires healthy conversations about growing up and sexuality. One such reviewer and scholar, Meryl Jaffe states it is a "powerful resource and jumping point for healthy, open, non-threatening discussion about powerfully challenging life issues." Author Mariko Tamaki believes the release of this novel allows for other young Asian Americans to grow up with other books to read including Asian protagonists. The novel indicates it is okay for one to be curious as a child while providing lessons of patience, self discovery, and compassion. Another reviewer claims educators and parents should aid the child reading the novel in order for them to grasp each theme and lesson. Corine Doiron, another scholar and reviewer, has stated this novel should be for high school audiences because they will identify with Rose and Windy while experiencing nostalgia when reading of their attempts to grow up.

== Reception ==
Jodi Chromey from Minnesota Reads called the art, which is done all in shades of blue, "gorgeous." The Horn Book Magazine stated that Jillian Tamaki's "rigorously composed, kinetic drawings teem with psychological nuance and action." Kirkus Reviews wrote that "Jillian and Mariko skillfully portray the emotional ups and downs of a girl on the cusp of adolescence." According to The New York Times, the book was a graphic novel for fans of coming-of-age stories with more complex themes and was a lovely book. Susan Burkman, an interviewer from the New York Times, stated the novel was a "moving, evocative book" and "if I worked at a bookstore, I'd be hand-selling it to customers." Reviewer Abigail Packard greatly enjoyed the novel and firmly stated, "This One Summer is a feat of graphic storytelling," and praised cousins Mariko and Jillian Tamaki in creating a phenomenal story. Another reviewer, Pamela Martinez, recommended This One Summer as her first graphic novel choice for children despite its sad storyline. However, some of the images and concepts in the novel have led to its subsequent censorship in education and libraries.

=== Censorship ===
This One Summer has been featured on the American Library Association's "Top Ten Most Challenged Books" list in 2018 as the 7th most challenged book and 1st in 2016 "for profanity, sexual references, and certain illustrations". According to the ALA, the reasoning for banning includes its use of LGBT characters, drug use, profanity, and sexuality explicit.

In 2016, libraries in Henning, Minnesota and Longwood, Florida removed This One Summer from their shelves after parents complained of the book's use of profanity and mature themes. After the incident in Florida in February, Mariko Tamaki said that the book is "listed as being for readers ranging 12–18," and "contains depictions of young people talking about, and dealing with, adult things." However, she stated that she thinks it is an important book for young people. The removals from libraries have been challenged by the National Coalition Against Censorship. The Comic Book Legal Defense Fund also challenged its removal in a K–12 library in Henning, Minnesota but restored the book in the library for students with parental permission in grades 10–12.

In response to the criticism, author Mariko Tamaki stated, '"[T]here are people who are uncomfortable with any discussion of sexuality, who see this as inappropriate, maybe, for any age of young reader," she said. "But really what expelling these books does is erase queer experiences, queer lives."' Another reviewer Meryl Jaffe identifies the issues regarding the profanity or sexuality within the novel but states they are appropriately developed and represent an accurate depiction of young teen life.

In 2022, This One Summer was listed among 52 books banned by the Alpine School District following the implementation of Utah law H.B. 374, "Sensitive Materials In Schools." Forty-two percent of removed books "feature LBGTQ+ characters and or themes." Many of the books were removed because they were considered to contain pornographic material according to the new law, which defines porn using the following criteria:

- "The average person" would find that the material, on the whole, "appeals to prurient interest in sex"
- The material "is patently offensive in the description or depiction of nudity, sexual conduct, sexual excitement, sadomasochistic abuse, or excretion"
- The material, on the whole, "does not have serious literary, artistic, political or scientific value."

== Awards ==
This One Summer won the 2015 Eisner Award for Best New Graphic Novel and the 2014 Ignatz Award for Outstanding Graphic Novel. It also won both a Printz Honor and a Caldecott Honor in 2015, making it the first graphic novel to be honored by a Caldecott committee and the second to receive the prestigious Printz Honor. Again in 2015, Tamaki also received the Lynd Ward Prize and became the first female to receive such an award from the Penn State Center for the Book. The illustrator of the novel, Jillian Tamaki, won the Governor General's Awards for both children's text and illustration and the novel was also nominated for the Eisner Award.
