= Rosemary Valero-O'Connell =

American illustrator and cartoonist

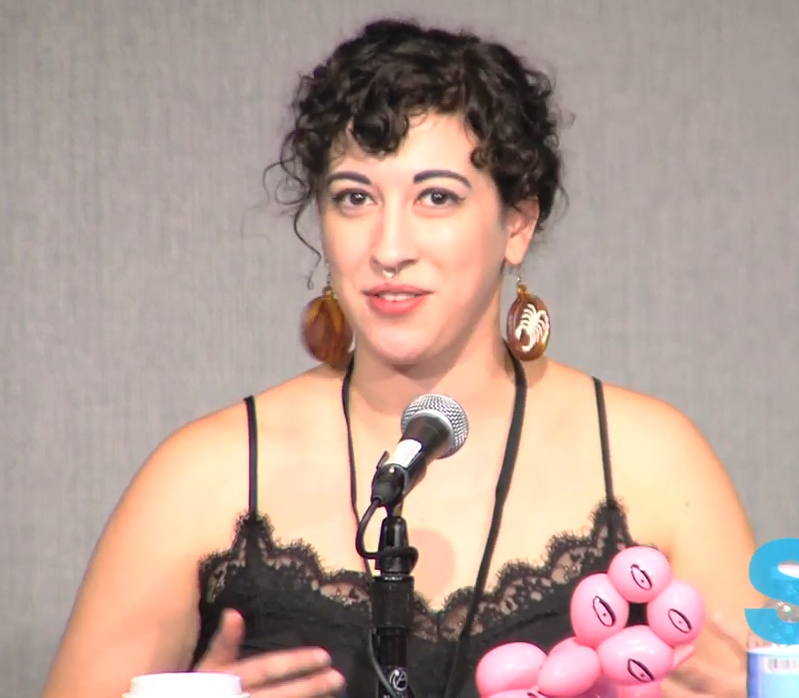
- Valero-O'Connell at Small Press Expo in 2019
- Born: October 28, 1994 (age 32)
- Education: Minneapolis College of Art and Design (BFA)
- Occupations: Illustrator, Cartoonist
- Writing career
- Language: English
- Period: 2010s
- Notable work: Laura Dean Keeps Breaking Up with Me

Rosemary Valero-O'Connell is an American illustrator and cartoonist. She is known for her work with DC Comics and BOOM! Studios.

== Early life ==
Rosemary Valero-O'Connell was born in Minneapolis, Minnesota and raised in Zaragoza, Spain. She graduated from the Minneapolis College of Art and Design with a BFA in Comic Art in 2016. Valero began a working relationship with First Second Comics after her editor purchased a copy of a 22-page minicomic she had written over a summer from the Museum of Comics and Cartoon Art's festival.

== Career ==
On June 15, 2015, the cover art was revealed for the first graphic novel edition of Steven Universe, which Valero-O'Connell illustrated. The comic was released in December of that same year under the title "Steven Universe: Too Cool for School".

In 2016, Valero worked with DC Comics and BOOM! Studios on a crossover comic issue of Gotham Academy and Lumberjanes as primary illustrator.

In 2016, it was announced that she had begun illustrating a graphic novel with Mariko Tamaki for First Second, Laura Dean Keeps Breaking Up with Me.

=== Laura Dean Keeps Breaking Up with Me ===
The cover of Laura Dean Keeps Breaking Up with Me was revealed September 24, 2018.

The graphic novel was released May 7, 2019.

== Bibliography ==
=== Graphic novels ===
- What is Left (2017)
- Laura Dean Keeps Breaking Up with Me (2019)
- Don't Go Without Me (2020)

=== Comic series ===
- Steven Universe ("Steven Universe: Too Cool for School")
- Gotham Academy /Lumberjanes crossover

=== Web comics ===
- If Only Once, If Only For A Little While

== Awards ==
In 2018, Valero-O'Connell was nominated for two Eisner Awards, Best Coloring and Best Single Issue / One-Shot, for her comic What is Left. In 2019 Laura Dean Keeps Breaking Up With Me won the Ignatz Award for Outstanding Graphic Novel as well as the Best Children's or Young Adult Book Award from the Harvey Awards. In 2020, Valero-O'Connell won an Eisner Award for Best Penciller/Inker for her work on Laura Dean Keeps Breaking Up With Me, which also won an Eisner Award in the Best Publication for Teens category. Valero-O'Connell won the 2020 Ignatz Award for Outstanding Artist.
