= Memetic (comic) =

Apocalyptic horror comic book series

- Cover to Memetic #1

Publication information
- Publisher: BOOM! Studios
- Genre: Apocalyptic; Horror
- Publication date: October 2014 – 2015
- No. of issues: 3

Creative team
- Written by: James Tynion IV
- Artist: Erik Donovan
- Colorist: Adam Guzowski

Collected editions
- Memetic: ISBN 978-1608867431

Memetic is a 2014 comic book miniseries that was created by James Tynion IV, with art by Eryk Donovan and coloring by Adam Guzowski. The series was published monthly by BOOM! Studios as three oversized issues, beginning in October 2014. In October 2015, BOOM! Studios released all three issues, along with extra features from the writer and artist, in trade paperback form.

== Background ==
Tynion IV came up with the idea for Memetic in 2012, when he was getting started in the comic book industry and wanted to create something along the lines of the horror genre. He describes Memetic as coming to him “fully formed,” and he further says that the pitch document from two years prior to the comic's publication looks very much the same as the final product.

Aaron and Marcus, the main protagonists, were created from the beginning of Memetic’s conception. Tynion wanted his protagonists to be “counter-points” to the world around them. He describes Aaron as like himself in college, and expresses that he thought it was important for Aaron to be a queer character.

== Plot ==
=== Issue One ===
The "Good Times Sloth"

At 7:04 am on "Day One", an image of a sloth against a colorful spiral background appears on the Internet and instantly becomes a viral sensation. Viewers of the image, which is dubbed "Good Times Sloth", claim that seeing it makes them feel amazing and tingle with happiness, and they have difficulty looking away.

Aaron Sumner, a queer college-age student who is colorblind and requires hearing aids, is trying to get a hold of his boyfriend Ryan after the two had an argument. His best friend Sarah attempts to share her excitement over the meme, but Aaron cannot feel the effects of the image due to his colorblindness. He repeatedly texts Ryan, begging him not to look at the meme.

Meanwhile, Marcus Shaw, a blind war veteran, becomes troubled by the sloth image when his friend Richie becomes obsessed with it. He contacts Barbara Xiang, an old friend and the author of an essay about "weaponized memetics", who isn't sure what to think of the situation, but notices that those who view the image feel compelled to spread it to others.

On the night of "Day One" it is discovered that twelve hours after exposure to the meme, one begins screaming and becomes violent. These so-called "screamers" bleed from their eyes and attempt to kill anyone around them who has not yet begun screaming. Aaron and Sarah's friend Martin becomes a screamer and kills their other friend Bastian. The two escape and barricade themselves in Aaron's room, but Sarah realizes she doesn't have much time left and runs to see her family. Elsewhere, Richie becomes a screamer and attempts to kill Marcus, but he fights back and survives the attack.

The issue ends with Ryan appearing at Aaron's door and telling him that he hasn't looked at the image yet.

=== Issue Two ===
On the morning of "Day Two", society begins to descend into chaos as armed police forces and screamers kill each other in the streets. Throughout the day, as more people begin screaming, the screams become louder and louder to everyone near them.

Barbara escorts Marcus to Washington D.C., to lead a small task force to Oregon to confront the creator and original poster of the image, who they believe might have a cure. The task force is made up of Marcus, Dr. Peter Klein, Captain Meredith Schroeder and Sgt. Casey Quinn. The team makes their way through an airplane hangar to find a plane to take to Oregon but they are ambushed by screamers. Casey is killed in the fighting while the remaining team members manage to secure a plane.

Aaron and Ryan decide to go to the college's medical center where Aaron is relieved to find a large stock of his medication. However, he also finds his parents, who have become screamers, locked behind a glass window by his doctor Crowne. Crowne has become delusional due to the meme's effects, and is distressed by Aaron's inability to feel the same euphoria. He attempts to capture Aaron so that he may be operated on to correct his colorblindness but Aaron breaks the window and frees his parents, who kill Crowne.

Fleeing the medical center, Aaron and Ryan take refuge in an abandoned apartment where they have sex. Afterward, Ryan reveals that he accidentally saw the meme that morning. Aaron begs Ryan not to leave him alone but Ryan is afraid of turning into a screamer like his brothers did and commits suicide by jumping from the apartment balcony.

In the airplane, Marcus, Peter and Meredith hear the screams of the screamers over their radio and experience a wave of euphoria. Peter realizes that the meme has already evolved and explains that the screams of the screamers are combining to reveal the "next shape" of the meme. By hearing the screams, Marcus and the others have experienced the effects of viewing the image and now only have twelve hours left to complete their mission.

=== Issue Three ===
On "Day Three", the screamers cease being violent. They accumulate all over the world in spaces with high volumes of other screamers, strip off their clothes and begin climbing each other to form incredibly tall grotesque human towers. After a little while, the people begin fusing together with nothing left but their screaming heads.

Aaron considers killing himself but he soon discovers a walkie-talkie with someone asking for help. A child on the other end asks him to come and save her, as she has been locked in a closet by her father with no food. Aaron ventures out to save to her. On the way there, Aaron discovers the towers and finds that he is immune to the effects of the screaming because of his hearing disability.

While searching for the child, he also comes into contact with Barbara Xiang on the walkie-talkie, who still has not seen the meme or heard the screams yet. Barbara has lost contact with Marcus and the others but is still trying to find a way to save humanity. Aaron finds the little girl, but discovers that she wants to join everyone else in the tower. He lets her go and finds that he is upset that he can't feel what everyone else is feeling.

Marcus, Peter and Meredith arrive in rural Oregon and find the creator of the meme. He is an artist who goes by the name of "The Maker" and is clearly insane. The Maker reveals to them that he was instructed by "the angels" to create the Good Times Sloth in order to trigger this apocalyptic event. The Maker kills himself and is revealed to have already destroyed his computers, leaving no possibility for a cure. Marcus and the others expect that they will become screamers at any moment. Meredith commits suicide while Peter is open to finding out what happens next. Marcus re-establishes communications with Barbara and says goodbye as he feels the transformation begin.

Barbara contacts Aaron, her final connection to the outside world and her last chance of finding a cure. Aaron, however, decides that he wants to feel what everyone else is feeling. He expresses sadness that his entire life, his colorblindness and hearing disability have left him unable to experience certain things that everyone else experiences, such as the color of the sky. Aaron begins to climb the tower while Barbara begs him not to. Abandoning the walkie-talkie, Aaron fuses with the tower, finally feeling the same euphoria as everyone else.

In the final moments of the comic, Barbara sees something entering the atmosphere on her computer screen. The last page shows "Day Four" beginning with a gigantic alien being descending on Earth from a hole in the sky.

== Film adaptation ==
In January 2020, it was reported that the comic book would be adapted into a film by Point Grey Pictures, in association with Boom! Studios and Lionsgate. Mattson Tomlin will write the screenplay for the film.

== Reception ==
Memetic received positive reviews. Benjamin Tilton from Slug Magazine, in his review for the trade paperback, says that days after reading the comic he is “still haunted by it.” He also complimented the artwork, calling it “fun and almost cartoon-like.” The Big Comics Page Team also applauded the originality of the concept and the artwork. Chase Magnett from ComicBook, in his review of the third issue, commended the twists in the final issue that “add[s] to both the joy and terror of the series.”

Memetic was nominated for the 2015 GLAAD Award for Outstanding Comic Book, but lost to Kurtis J. Wiebe's Rat Queens.
