= Vertigo (comics) =

Vertigo, in comics, may refer an imprint, or a character:

- Vertigo (DC Comics), an imprint of DC Comics
- Vertigo (Marvel Comics), two Marvel Comics characters
- Vertigo (Salem's Seven), another Marvel character
- Count Vertigo, a DC Comics supervillain

== See also ==
- Vertigo (disambiguation)
