= This Place Kills Me =

2025 graphic novel

- Date: August 19, 2025
- Page count: 272 pages
- Publisher: Abrams Fanfare

Creative team
- Writer: Mariko Tamaki
- Artist: Nicole Goux
- ISBN: 9781419768460

This Place Kills Me is a 2025 noir graphic novel written by Mariko Tamaki and illustrated by Nicole Goux. It follows outcast new student Abby Kita, who tries to solve the murder of a girl at her school while dealing with memories of her own dark past. It received positive reception and won two Eisner Awards in 2026.

== Plot ==
The book is set in the 1980s at the all-girls Wilberton Academy. At a party following a performance of Romeo and Juliet conducted by the Wilberton Theatre Society, Abby Kita, a new girl at the school, tries to find someone to talk to, but everyone brushes her off, including her roommate Claire. Outside the party, Abby meets Elizabeth Woodward, who played Juliet. The two talk briefly and Elizabeth drops her playbook, which has the initials E. W. on the cover, as she leaves, with Abby deciding to return it to her the next day. However, the following morning, Elizabeth is found dead outside the school, stabbed by her prop dagger. The police tell everyone to return to their rooms, but Abby instead to sneaks the scene of Elizabeth's death, where the police deem it a suicide. Later, while going back to class, she overhears Jessica, the play's director and Elizabeth's roommate, tell Principal Wilson that Elizabeth had a boyfriend. Abby browses Elizabeth's playbook and indeed finds a romantic note to Elizabeth, but the handwriting makes her suspect the author is a girl.

The next day at an assembly it is announced that Elizabeth had narcotics in her system. During the night, Abby hears wailing from the woods 5surrounding the school and discovers Katie, another Wilberton Theatre Society member, acting strangely. She collapses in Abby's arms, causing Abby to have a flashback to a party where a girl suffered from alcohol poisoning. An ambulance ends up taking Katie away. The morning after, Claire brings Abby to a pharmacy near the school. Claire suspects Elizabeth and Katie took valium, and flips through the pharmacy's checkbook to see if either of them bought any, though she doesn't find either name. Abby shows her Elizabeth's playbook and Claire finds a list in the playbook, which Abby assumed was a cast list, and reveals that cannot be the case as some of the girls no longer attend the school and Elizabeth's name is absent. Abby and Claire later go back into town and use a payphone to try to contact former students who were on the list. Principal Wilson notices them and drives them back to school due to the cold weather. In her car, Abby spots a handbag with the name Ewan Wilson, Principal Wilson's husband, written on it. Shortly afterwards, the two girls are called to Principal Wilson's office, where she admonishes them for harassing former students. In class, Claire changes seats in class from being next to Abby to next to Jessica, and Jessica slides her a note. Abby finds the crumpled note in their room later, and discovers that Jessica told Claire that Abby was 'sick' and that Claire should switch rooms to be with Jessica.

While later leaving the school library, a group of hooded people attack Abby, and she escapes with a black eye. After being confronted by Claire in their room, Abby reveals why she came to WIlberton; at her old school she was in a romantic relationship with a girl who struggled with drug use, with Abby trying to help her through it. After the girl became sick from alcohol poisoning at a party and had to be hospitalized, she lied to her parents that Abby had drugged her and tricked her into being lesbian. She refused all contact from Abby and Abby's parents eventually decided it would be best to change schools.

In class, a note is left on Abby's desk, telling her she already knows the time and place. She goes into the woods at night, where she is confronted by Jessica and the other members of the Wilberton Theatre Society. Abby reveals that is already figured out the truth behind Elizabeth's death; the E. W. on the playbook's cover didn't stand for Elizabeth Woodward, but Ewan Wilson, and the list was of students he had sex with. When Elizabeth discovered that Jessica had become Mr. Wilson's latest target, she threatened to report him. The other girls spiked Elizabeth's drink as a bid to make her too scared to report Mr. Wilson, but accidentally caused her to overdose. Realizing she would not survive, Jessica stabbed her with the dagger. Abby further concludes that the love note given to Elizabeth was written by Jessica, recognizing the handwriting from her note to Claire. Jessica tries to deny that she and Elizabeth were lovers, but ends up storming away crying. Lastly, Abby reveals that that morning she sent a letter posing as a concerned parent to the police, exposing Mr. Wilson's actions.

In the aftermath, the resulting scandal causes Wimbledon to be shut down, though Abby and Claire are uncertain if the closure will be permanent and if Mr. Wilson will face justice. As Abby and Claire prepare to leave, Claire apologizes for misjudging Abby, and the two promise to maintain their friendship.

== Reception ==
The book received starred reviews from Kirkus Reviews, School Library Journal, and Publishers Weekly. Publishers Weekly described the book as "twisty and captivating". Reviewers noted the color scheme, with use of contrasting gray and pink tones.

Sean Dillon of The Beat gave a positive review to the book, noting the use of noir and LGBTQ themes.

The Hub, a blog for the American Library Association, stated that "the story unfolds with tension and a cinematic flair", additionally praising Goux's art as "capturing both the haunting beauty of Wilberton and the creeping dread that something is very wrong beneath the surface"

=== Accolades ===
| Year | Award/Honor | Result | Ref. |
|---|---|---|---|
| 2026 | Eisner Award for Best Publication for Teens | Won | |
| 2026 | Eisner Award for Best Writer (for Mariko Tamaki) | Won | |
| 2026 | Harvey Award for Best Young Adult Book | Won | |
| 2026 | Great Graphic Novels for Teens | Included | |
| 2026 | Quick Picks For Reluctant Young Adult Readers | Included | |
| 2025 | School Library Journal Best Books of the Year | Included | |
| 2025 | Publishers Weekly Best Books of the Year - Young Adult | Included | |
