= Mariko Tamaki =

Canadian writer and artist (born 1975)

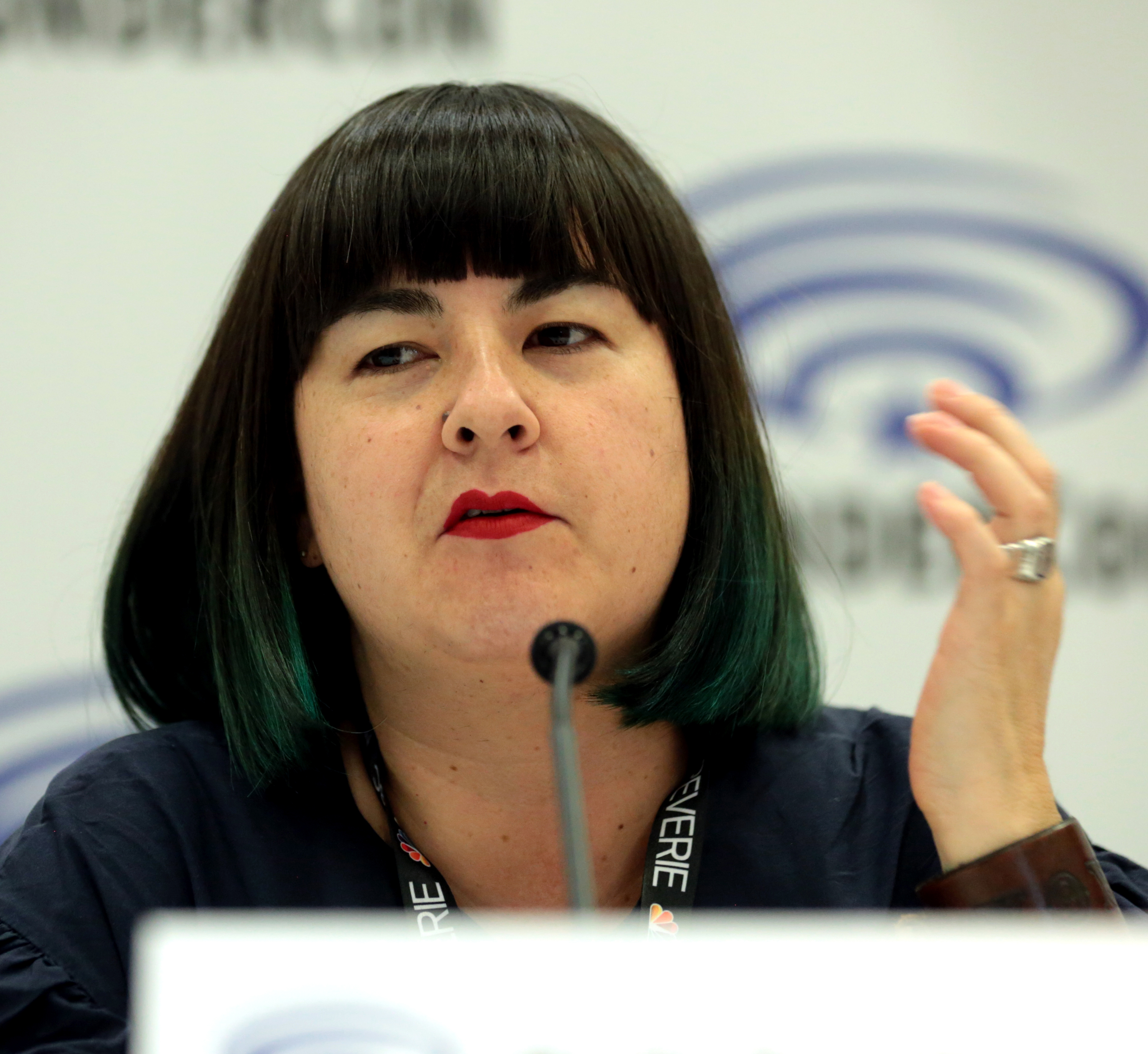
- Tamaki in 2018
- Born: 1975 (age 50–51); Toronto, Canada
- Occupations: Graphic novel writer, performance artist
- Writing career
- Period: 2000s–present
- Notable works: Skim, This One Summer
- Website: www.marikotamaki.com

Mariko Tamaki (born 1975) is a Canadian artist and writer. She is known for her graphic novels Laura Dean Keeps Breaking Up With Me, Skim, Emiko Superstar, and This One Summer. In 2016, she began writing for both Marvel and DC Comics. She has twice been named a runner-up for the Michael L. Printz Award.

== Early life ==
Mariko Tamaki was born in Toronto, Ontario, to a Jewish-Canadian mother and a Japanese Canadian father.

Tamaki attended Havergal College, an all girls' secondary school. She studied English literature at McGill University, graduating in 1994.

== Career ==
Tamaki has worked as a writer and performance artist in Toronto, including with Keith Cole's Cheap Queers and in the performance group Pretty Porky & Pissed Off with Joanne Huffa, Allyson Mitchell, Abi Slone, Tracy Tidgwell, and Zoe Whittall.

Tamaki published the novel Cover Me in 2000. Told in a series of flashbacks, it is about a depressed teenager dealing with self-harm and feeling like an outsider in school.

Skim, a collaboration with her cousin Jillian Tamaki, was published in 2008 by Groundwood Books. It is a graphic novel about a teenage girl who develops romantic feelings towards her female teacher; the secondary storyline is about the suicide of a classmate's ex-boyfriend who may have been gay. The text is about transitional life moments and "the conflicting need to belong and desire to resist." Tamaki says she did not set out to "make a statement about queerness and youth:" "I think Skim is more a statement about youth, and the variety of strange experiences that can encapsulate." According to one reviewer, "the expressionistic fluidity of the black and white illustrations serves the purpose of pages of prose;" there is little plot and spare dialogue. Tamaki writes that artists such as Hergé, Igort, and Vittorio Giardino, as well as Asian art, had an influence on her style, but her storytelling is rooted in American comics influences like Daniel Clowes, Chester Brown, and Will Eisner. Skim was originally developed as a short play for Nightwood Theatre.

Emiko Superstar, Tamaki's second graphic novel and first with illustrator Steve Rolston, is about a young woman who feels trapped in her suburban life. It was inspired by performance art and Girlspit, an open mic night event in Montreal. The protagonist is inspired to try performance art after visiting a similar space. As one review says, "this is a story about finding oneself, one's voice, and one's true character amidst the trappings of counter-culture fame."

Tamaki performed at experimental feminist performance art festival Edgy Women in Montreal in 2006 and 2010.

In 2014, she again collaborated with Jillian Tamaki on the graphic novel This One Summer, published by Groundwood Books.

In 2016, it was announced that Tamaki would be writing a new series called Hulk starring She-Hulk for Marvel Comics, as well as the mini-series Supergirl: Being Super for DC Comics.

In 2017, she began writing novel adaptations of the Lumberjanes comic series.

Tamaki's graphic novel collaboration with artist Rosemary Valero-O'Connell, Laura Dean Keeps Breaking Up with Me, is a queer coming-of-age story about a toxic relationship. It was released in May 2019 by First Second Books.

In November 2019, Tamaki wrote a four-part mini-series for Marvel called Spider-Man & Venom: Double Trouble.

Tamaki began writing for the Wonder Woman series with #759. Her run concluded with #769, and was collected in its entirety in a trade paperback titled Lords and Liars.

Tamaki's graphic novel I Am Not Starfire was released on 10 August 2021 as part of the young adult original graphic novel series from DC Comics. Yoshi Yoshitani provided art for the story, which centers Starfire's daughter Mandy Koriand'r, who plans on "moving to France to escape the family spotlight and not go to college" despite her mother's protestations.

In January 2021, as part of DC's Future State event, Tamaki and artist Dan Mora collaborated on Dark Detective, with colors by Jordie Bellaire. The series ran for four issues from January to February. In March, Tamaki, Mora, and Bellaire became the new creative team for Detective Comics, beginning with #1034. Tamaki is the first female lead writer of the title's publication history. Her run concluded with #1061.

In April 2026, Oni Press announced the release of a four part miniseries of Adventure Time comics, Adventure Time: Quadruple Feature, written by Tamaki and illustrated by Brenda Hickey. The series centres around cinema, with the first issue being released in July 2026.

== Awards ==
Skim won an Ignatz Award, a Joe Shuster Award, and a Doug Wright Award in 2009, and was a nominee for the Children's Literature category at the 2008 Governor General's Awards. Tamaki was also awarded an Honour of Distinction by the Dayne Ogilvie Prize, a literary award for LGBTQ writers in Canada, in 2012.

This One Summer won a 2014 Ignatz Award, a 2015 Eisner Award, a Caldecott Honor, and a 2016 Rudolph Dirks Award in the category Youth Drama / Coming of Age.

In 2019, Laura Dean Keeps Breaking Up with Me won the Ignatz Award for Outstanding Graphic Novel as well as the Best Children's or Young Adult Book Award from the Harvey Awards. Laura Dean Keeps Breaking Up with Me was also awarded the 2020 Walter Award in the Teen category, and received the Eisner Award for Best Publication for Teens. That same year, she also received the Eisner Award for Best Writer, for Laura Dean Keeps Breaking Up with Me, Harley Quinn: Breaking Glass, and Archie.

Her 2023 graphic novel Roaming, illustrated by Jillian Tamaki, was shortlisted for the 2024 Lambda Literary Award for LGBTQ+ Comics. Roaming won the 2024 Eisner Award for Best Graphic Album—New, with Tamaki winning the 2024 Eisner for Best Writer.

In 2024, Tamaki would be a recipient of the Inkpot Award at the annual San Diego Comic Con.

In 2026, she won the Eisner Award for Best Writer again for This Place Kills Me, which also won the Eisner Award for Best Publication for Teens. This Place Kills Me also won the Harvey Award for Best Young Adult Book in the same year.

== Works ==
- Cover Me (2000, ISBN 9780969806493)
- True Lies: The Book of Bad Advice (2002, ISBN 9780889614024)
- Fake ID (2005, ISBN 9780889614499)
- Skim, with Jillian Tamaki (2008, ISBN 9788861238282)
- Emiko Superstar, with Steve Rolston (2008, ISBN 9781401215361)
- (You) Set Me on Fire (2012, ISBN 9780143180937)
- This One Summer, with Jillian Tamaki (2014, ISBN 159643774X)
- Tomb Raider II (2016-2017)
- Saving Montgomery Sole (2016, ISBN 9781626722712)
- Supergirl: Being Super (2016-2017)
- X-23 (2018)
- Laura Dean Keeps Breaking Up with Me, illustrated by Rosemary Valero-O'Connell (2019, ISBN 9781250312846)
- Harley Quinn: Breaking Glass, illustrated by Steve Pugh (2019, ISBN 9781401283292)
- Spider-Man & Venom: Double Trouble (2020, ISBN 9781302920395)
- Wonder Woman, #759-769 (2020, ISBN 978-1779510228)
- Overwatch: Tracer – London Calling (2020)
- Thor & Loki: Double Trouble (2021)
- Dark Detective, #1-4, illustrated by Dan Mora (2021)
- I Am Not Starfire, illustrated by Yoshi Yoshitani (2021, ISBN 9781779501264)
- Detective Comics, #1034-1061 (2021-2022)
- Anne of Greenville (2022, ISBN 9781368078405)
- Roaming, with Jillian Tamaki (2023, ISBN 9781770464339)
- Zatanna: Bring Down The House, illustrated by Javier Rodríguez (2024)
- This Place Kills Me, illustrated by Nicole Goux (2025, ISBN 9781419768453)

Lumberjanes novels, all illustrated by Gus Allen

- Unicorn Power! (2017, ISBN 9781419727252)
- The Moon Is Up (2018, ISBN 9781419728686)
- The Good Egg (2018, ISBN 9781419740923)
- Ghost Cabin (2019, ISBN 9781419733611)
- The Lumberjanes BEASTiary (2020, ISBN 9781419736445)

She-Hulk

- Volume 1: Deconstructed, illustrated by Nico Leon and Dalibor Talajic (2017, ISBN 9781302905675)
- Volume 2: Let Them Eat Cake, illustrated by Georges Duarte, Bachan, Julian Lopez, and Francesco Gaston (2018, ISBN 9781302905682)
- Volume 3: Jen Walters Must Die, illustrated by Jahnoy Lindsay and Diego Olortegui (2018, ISBN 9781302905699)
