= Monthly =

Monthly usually refers to the scheduling of something every month. It may also refer to:

- The Monthly
- Monthly Magazine
- Monthly Review
- PQ Monthly
- Home Monthly
- Trader Monthly
- Overland Monthly
- Menstruation, sometimes known as "monthly"
