= The Department of Truth =

2020 mystery science fiction comic book series

Publication information
- Publisher: Image Comics
- Schedule: Monthly
- Format: Ongoing series
- Genre: Mystery, science fiction
- Publication date: September 30, 2020
- No. of issues: 34 (including issue #0)

Creative team
- Written by: James Tynion IV
- Artist: Martin Simmonds

The Department of Truth is a 2020 ongoing comic book series created by writer James Tynion IV and artist Martin Simmonds and published monthly by Image Comics. The series follows FBI special agent Cole Turner as he investigates the secrets behind conspiracy theories and becomes involved in the battle to decide reality for every person on Earth.

The series has received numerous accolades, including five Eisner Award nominations.

== Plot summary ==
FBI special agent Cole Turner is brought to a secret office hidden in the lower levels of the Library of Congress, where he is interviewed by an elderly Lee Harvey Oswald. Turner reveals that he infiltrated a conference of the Flat Earth society, whose members recruited him to board a private jet flying to an undisclosed location. En route, Turner met the mysterious Woman in Red and then witnessed the manifestation of the Flat Earth theory with his own eyes. Before they could reach the edge of the Earth, Agent Ruby, an operative of the Department of Truth, assassinated the plane's passengers and brought Turner back to Washington. After Turner completes his story, Oswald informs him he has been reassigned to the DOT.

Turner learns that the DOT's mission is to control conspiracy theories (sometimes by deadly means) before too many people believe them and cause the theories to become real.

During their investigations, Turner is faced with an incident from his childhood, where he experienced a recurring nightmare of a Star-Faced Man who threatened to eat him and all his loved ones. Turner was coerced into making false accusations against his elementary school teachers as part of the 1970s Satanic Panic. Turner and Ruby encounter other conspiracy theories which have gained momentum in the public consciousness, such as crisis actors in school shootings, men in black, moth men, and the legend of Bigfoot.

When two Washington Post reporters gain information about the DOT's operations, Oswald orders Turner to kill them and reveals the information was supplied by the DOT's rival organization call Black Hat.

Martin Barker, the leader of Black Hat, attempts to recruit Turner by revealing Star-Faced Man is still active and that Oswald has intentionally kept that information from him. Oswald introduces Turner to Hawk Harrison, another of the DOT's special agents, who has been involved in manipulating reality for the USA. Hawkins reveals he created the plan to link Turner's childhood nightmares to the Satanic Panic and coached young Turner's accusations in support of the DOT's larger operations.

Turner learns the DOT's origins trace back to beliefs recorded by Pope Sylvester II in 1000 A.D., which were later obtained by Adolf Hitler and his Nazi regime and almost changed the outcome of World War II. When the war ended in 1945, U.S. forces and Russian soldiers both took pieces of the information back to their home countries. President Truman convened a group of advisors to examine the information, including filmmaker Frank Capra. Capra was charged with generating international popularity for the American way of life, including faking the moon landing with aid from Stanley Kubrick under the orders of President Nixon.

Oswald reveals he was recruited in 1959 and sent undercover to Russia to learn the operations of the Soviet Union's DOT counterpart, the Ministry of Lies. After Oswald's apparent killing in 1963, he was secretly brought to the DOT's headquarters and charged with taking over operations. Assisted by young UFO theorist Doc Hynes, and later by a young Hawk Harrison, he learns that religious fanatics L. Ron Hubbard and Aleister Crowley performed a ritual to summon the Woman in Red, a psychic manifestation that can control reality and bring about the end of the world.

In an effort to influence Turner, Black Hat approaches Turner's husband Matt, who is also a reporter at the Washington Post. Harrison, revealing himself to be a double agent, shows him video of Turner killing the two journalists. When Matt considers writing the story, Oswald comes forward to reveal the whole truth of the DOT on record, including his role in the John F. Kennedy assassination.

== Development and publication history ==
Tynion was hesitant to launch a book at Image Comics due to the heavy financial and promotion investment of producing a creator-owned book under the Image system. However, he decided Image was the right home for a story containing such controversial material.

Tynion had been interested in conspiracy fiction for a long period. In summer 2017, he re-watched the JFK film directed by Oliver Stone, leading him to envision the structure of The Department of Truth's first issue.

Tynion decided that the "scratchy" art style which Bill Sienkiewicz and Dave Mckean produced in the 1980s and 1990s would be the right fit. He discovered Martin Simmonds's musician sketches on social media and pitched the idea of collaborating on the series, even though they had never met or worked together before. Originally planned for 15 issues (which Tynion could self-fund if sales were not strong), Simmonds agreed, but start on the project was delayed until Simmonds could complete his work on Punk is Dead and Dying is Easy for IDW.

Simmonds chose to approach the book's artwork with a "kinetic, expressive aesthetic" to "enhance the paranoid feeling". To accomplish the series' signature look, he moved away from a digital art process and focused on using traditional media, collage, and photography elements.

Turner's character was based in part on Tynion's own background, and his visual appearance was centered on the concept of a "nerdier version" of Robert Redford in Three Days of the Condor.

Issue #1 was released in September 2020, with orders exceeding 100,000 copies.

The Department of Truth Volume 1 was the best-selling graphic novel through Diamond Distributors in 2021.

In October 2024, Tynion released The Department of Truth: Wild Fictions, a collection of original "case files" connected to The Department of Truth's activities in the late 20th Century. In addition to reprinting the Bigfoot story from TDOT #10 and 11, the book contained text-based chapters with illustrations by Simmonds, James Stokoe, Bill Sienkiewicz, Yuko Shimuzu, and Erica Henderson.

== Reception ==
Forbes called the series "a wonderfully dizzy mixture of Men in Black, John Carpenter, Stephen King, The Matrix, and 1970s conspiracy thrillers". GamesRadar+ praised the "knockout" visual style of both Simmonds and letterer Aditya Bidikar, and Entertainment Weekly said Simmonds's art "captures the blurred lines between fantasy and reality in disturbing fashion". IGN stated the overall tone of the series "should appeal to anyone with a fondness for The X-Files". Conversely, Jamey Keeton's review of Volume 1 for The Comics Journal criticized the story for being "convoluted" and "confusing".

In 2021, New York Public Library named The Department of Truth one of its Best Books for Adults. Entertainment Weekly chose TDOT as one of the 10 Best Comics of 2021.

== Other media ==
The film and television rights to The Department of Truth were purchased by Sister, the production banner co-founded by Elisabeth Murdoch, Stacey Snider, and Jane Featherstone, in February 2021.

== Awards and nominations ==
The Department of Truth has been nominated for five Eisner Awards, including Best Continuing Series. Tynion won Eisners for Best Writer in 2021, 2022, and 2023 for his work on the series and other titles.

Award nominations for The Department of Truth
Year	Organization	Award	Result
2021	Eisner Awards	Best New Series	Nominated
2021	Eisner Awards	Best Continuing Series	Nominated
2021	Eisner Awards	Best Writer	Won
2021	Eisner Awards	Best Lettering	Nominated
2021	Harvey Awards	Book of the Year	Nominated
2022	Eisner Awards	Best Continuing Series	Nominated
2022	Eisner Awards	Best Writer	Won
2022	Harvey Awards	Book of the Year	Nominated
2023	Eisner Awards	Best Continuing Series	Nominated
2023	Eisner Awards	Best Writer	Won

== Collected Editions ==
Collected editions of The Department of Truth
Title	Material collected	Publication date	ISBN
TRADE PAPERBACKS
The Department of Truth – Volume One	The Department of Truth #1–5 "The End of the World"	March 2, 2021	978-1-5343-1833-5
The Department of Truth – Volume Two	The Department of Truth #8–13 "The City Upon a Hill"	November 2, 2021	978-1-5343-1921-9
The Department of Truth – Volume Three	The Department of Truth #6–7, 14–17 "Free Country"	May 3, 2022	978-1-5343-2119-9
The Department of Truth – Volume Four	The Department of Truth #18–22 "The Ministry of Lies"	December 20, 2022	978-1-5343-2341-4
The Department of Truth – Volume Five	The Department of Truth #23–27 "What Your Country Can Do For You"	February 11, 2025	978-1-5343-6949-8
The Department of Truth – Volume Six	The Department of Truth #28–33 "Twilight's Last Gleaming"	November 11, 2025	978-1-5343-3015-3
HARDCOVERS
The Department of Truth: Wild Fictions	The Department of Truth #10–11 Case files from The Department of Truth Field Office	October 8, 2024	978-1-5343-8853-6
DELUXE HARDCOVERS
The Department of Truth – The Complete Conspiracy Book 1	The Department of Truth #1–17	May 9, 2023	978-1-5343-9972-3
The Department of Truth – The Complete Conspiracy Book 2	The Department of Truth #18–33, #0	May 26, 2026	978-1-5343-3256-0
