= Laura Dean Keeps Breaking Up with Me =

Graphic novel

- Author: Mariko Tamaki
- Illustrator: Rosemary Valero-O'Connell
- Cover artist: Rosemary Valero-O'Connell
- Language: English
- Genre: Young adult novel; Lesbian teen fiction
- Published: May 7, 2019
- Publisher: First Second
- Publication place: United States (Note: Although described as a Canadian work due to being written by Canadian comics writer Mariko Tamaki, the novel was published by American publisher First Second Books.)
- Media type: Print (hardcover)
- Pages: 304
- Awards: Harvey Award (2019); Ignatz Award (2019); Eisner Award (2020)
- ISBN: 978-1-62672-259-0

Laura Dean Keeps Breaking Up with Me is a graphic novel written by Mariko Tamaki and illustrated by Rosemary Valero-O'Connell. It follows Frederica "Freddy" Riley throughout her struggles with her on-again, off-again relationship with the eponymous Laura Dean. The novel was first published by First Second Books on May 7, 2019. A young adult and lesbian teen novel, Laura Dean includes themes about teenage lesbian and queer sexuality.

Laura Dean received critical acclaim from book critics and media publications who lauded Tamaki's and Valero-O'Connell's work on the novel, as well as their dynamic. The novel's writing and narrative was critically praised, with many publications calling the dialogue authentic. Valero-O'Connell's artwork was also positively received, with reviews of Laura Dean praising her visual storytelling and use of color. The story also received praise for the diversity and relatability displayed by its characters. The novel went on to receive multiple industry awards and was included in various publications' year-end lists regarding the best comics and novels of 2019.

== Plot ==
Laura Dean Keeps Breaking Up with Me is set in Berkeley, California. It follows Frederica Riley, or Freddy—a 17-year-old lesbian of a mixed East Asian and white background—as she struggles in her relationship with her girlfriend, Laura Dean. Portrayed as a popular and aloof "cool girl", Laura continually breaks up with Freddy, only to start their romantic relationship up again whenever the former desires. While focusing on a way to prevent a further break up, Freddy inadvertently distances herself from her social circle, which includes Buddy, Eric, and her best friend Doodle, by repeatedly neglecting her friendships with them. Distressed about her relationship struggles, Freddy seeks out answers as to why Dean keeps breaking up with her. Freddy receives relationship advice from the Seek-Her, a local medium (Note: While the novel does not explicitly describe the Seek-Her outside of being an "advice-giver", media publications have referred to her as a fortune teller, medium, or mystic.) recommended to her by Doodle; from Vi, a potential crush of hers; and from Anna Vice, a relationship advice columnist.

After continuously and inadvertently distancing herself from her friends, Buddy strongly suggests to Freddy that she should "talk" to Doodle. Following this, Doodle admits to Freddy that she became pregnant after having sex with a married man, and that she intends to have an abortion. Freddy plans to go with Doodle to her abortion clinic appointment, and tells Laura that she won't be able to see her on her birthday. Freddy later receives a text from Laura concerning an emergency. As a result, Freddy visits Laura and is told that there is no emergency. Rather, Laura explains that for her birthday, she wanted to see Freddy, despite her earlier assurance that Freddy's absence would be alright. Freddy is taken aback, and as people begin showing up at Laura's home, Freddy leaves to go to Doodle's appointment. Following the appointment, Freddy consoles Doodle at the latter's home. Freddy then finally receives an email response from Anna Vice, who advises Freddy to ask herself what her love for Laura offers in regard to being a better person. Ultimately, Freddy visits Laura in the aftermath of her birthday party, where she breaks up with Laura. Surprised and angered by this, Laura lashes out and curses at Freddy while in tears. The novel ends with visuals of Freddy and Doodle dancing at their prom paired with a final email from Freddy to Anna Vice, where she expresses her choosing to be "things that are something other than the ex-girlfriend of Laura Dean."

== Development and publication ==
In April 2016, Mariko Tamaki and Rosemary Valero-O'Connell announced they were collaborating on Laura Dean Keeps Breaking Up with Me. It was the first collaboration between Tamaki and Valero-O'Connell. Valero-O'Connell told the Los Angeles Times that the previous December, First Second editor Calista Brill had sent her an email asking if she had interest in testing to be the artist for Tamaki's next book, to which she agreed. As a teenager, Valero-O'Connell was inspired by Tamaki's work to begin working on comics of her own.

When asked if there were any specific inspirations for Laura Dean, Tamaki stated that she "always liked the idea of an ex-ex-girlfriend story, about the girl that got away and then shows up a week later with a smile like nothing happened," and added that a lot of her relationships when she was younger "weren't fairy-tale girl-meets-girl, girl-finds-true-love-type things. They were a mess". She added that television series My So-Called Life and Freaks and Geeks, as well as John Hughes films, influenced the novel's development. In a 2019 online interview with the Canadian Broadcasting Corporation (CBC), Tamaki stated: "I didn't want [Laura Dean Keeps Breaking Up with Me] to just be a story where the goal is just to find love and love is achieved, then that is the end of the story. I wanted to look at love and relationships and then complicate them. When I was a younger person, especially a queer younger person, all I wanted were stories about relationships. All I wanted were love stories."

The cover for the book was revealed in September 2018. Although originally pegged for a 2018 release, First Second Books published the novel on May 7, 2019. Valero-O'Connell sold her artwork for the graphic novel as a fundraiser for Bernie Sanders's 2020 presidential campaign.

== Style and themes ==
A "queer coming-of-age story", many media outlets noted the queer themes present in the novel. Particularly, media publications noted the presence of a dynamic cast of LGBT characters, who were portrayed with a diversity in their races, sexualities, gender expressions, and body types. While Laura has been cited as having as "charismatic appeal" or being "enigmatic", the novel also depicts her as the catalyst for a bad and abusive romantic relationship involving two girls. Laura gaslights, emotionally manipulates, fetishizes, and cheats on Freddy throughout the novel, and as a result of Laura's behavior toward her, Freddy is kept from being involved in the lives of those she cares about. Aside from highlighting themes about queer romantic relationships, the theme of platonic friendship is also explored in the novel. In Laura Dean, subplots involving Freddy's friends help "address other issues faced by queer teens and sexually active young women."

Literary media publications have also noted the novel's setting in Berkeley, with the city portrayed as queer-friendly. Valero-O'Connell stated that she and Tamaki toured Berkeley and the San Francisco Bay Area in order to "look at architecture and look at locations and take stock of the world that these people live in," and she developed characters "to feel like people that [she] knew and like people that existed in [her] life, in the world and specifically in the Bay Area." Due to Valero-O'Connell's "California glow" portrayal of the novel's city setting, Quill & Quire likened the vibe of the novel to that of television drama The L Word. Of the novel's visual aesthetic, several publications noted the splash of pink accents to go along with the novel's otherwise black-and-white coloring. Valero-O'Connnell's art was also compared to the style often seen in manga works.

Tamaki stated that during their scouting of Berkeley, Valero-O'Connell "kept taking pictures of succulents." This translated to the novel's artwork, as the visually abundant plant life is another key motif in the novel. Brendan Kiely of The New York Times wrote that "the lush foliage and plant life bursting from the background, sometimes even overtaking the foreground, suggests that life is growing, even thriving, all around Freddy." Oliver Sava of The A.V. Club similarly wrote that the lush greenery adds "an element of natural beauty to the panels while evoking different emotional responses."

== Reception ==
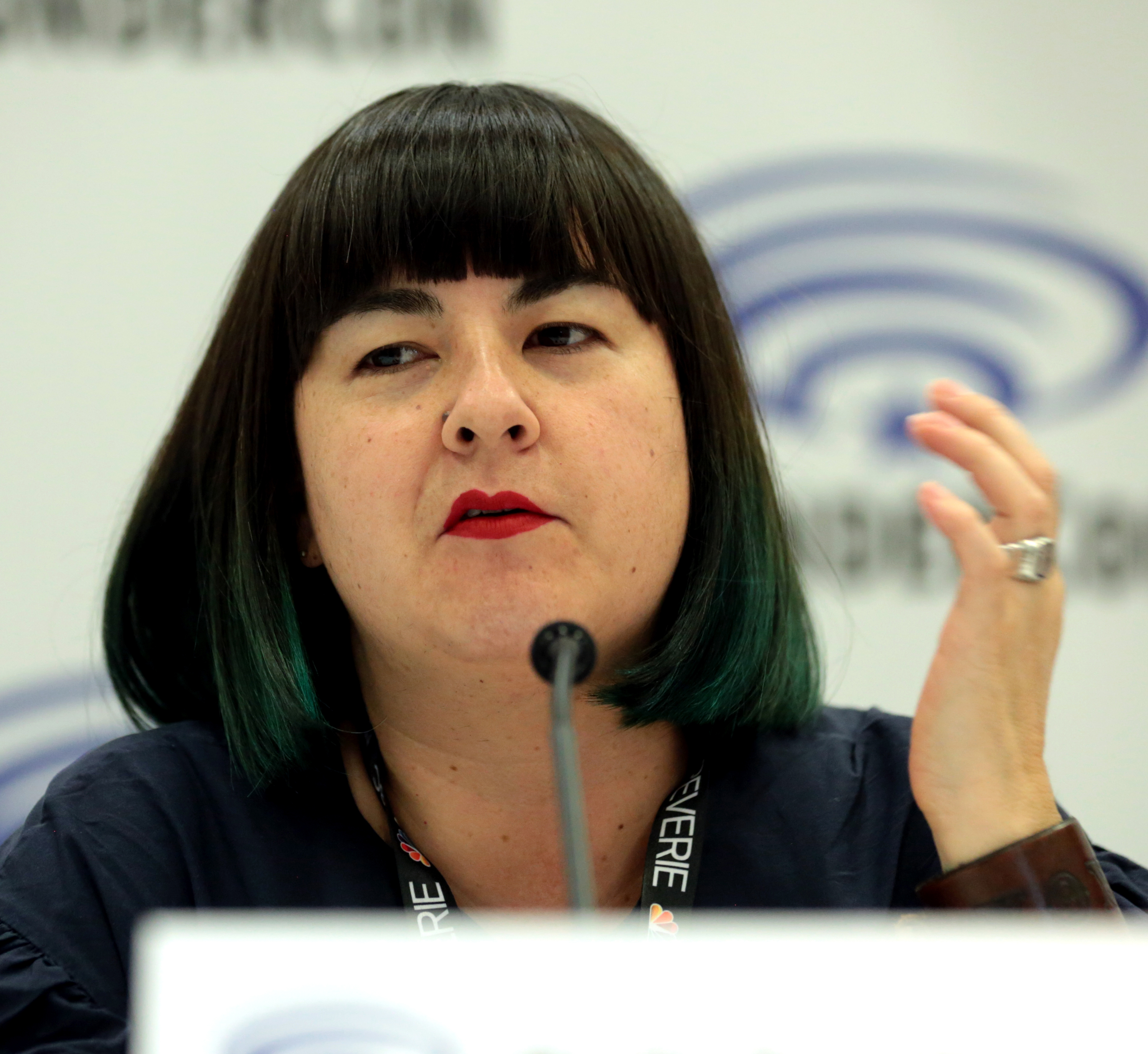
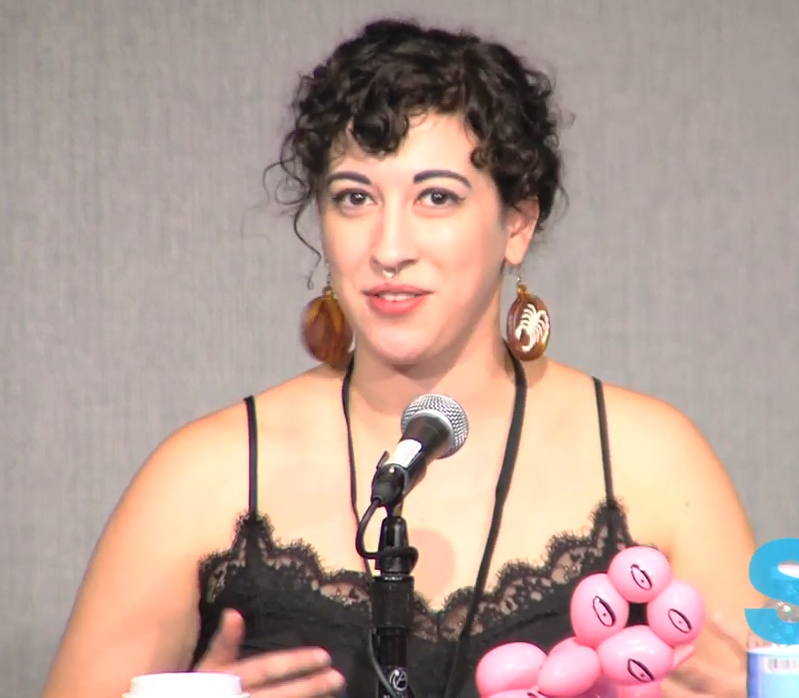
Tamaki (top) and Valero-O'Connell (bottom) received praise from critics for their work on the novel.

The novel received widespread critical acclaim. Tamaki's writing was praised, with various publications describing the novel's characters and dialogue as realistic and authentic. Valero O'Connell's artwork also received praise, with her coloring and use of space being noted by outlets.

The Toronto Star wrote "[Tamaki and Valero-O'Connell] showed that a story about a lovelorn queer teenage girl, published in a YA book, can be relatable to anyone who's ever had a bad relationship." Kiely wrote that "Tamaki and Valero-O'Connell slyly undercut the rocky romance, preventing it from veering into melodrama with endearing moments between the girls' other friends and flashes of humor," adding that the author–illustrator duo's "tenderhearted narrative sings with real, honest emotion that will resonate with anyone trying to figure out love." Quill & Quire also commended the two's collaboration, writing "Tamaki and Valero-O'Connell have developed a sophisticated storytelling dynamic, which involves sparse dialogue pushing the narrative forward while detailed illustrative attention to body language and facial expressions provides the emotion." Forbes writer Rob Salkowitz wrote that Laura Dean's inclusion of a "depoliticized and unfussy depiction of gender-fluid teen culture in the 2010s" makes the novel "a step forward in LGBTQ graphic literature."

Katie Bircher of The Horn Book Magazine praised the novel's writing, as she opined that "Freddy's insightful and painfully honest first-person narration [...] is balanced by dialogue full of witty banter and warm moments of friendship." Mallory Yu of NPR wrote that Tamaki's dialogue feels natural and is delivered by "infinitely relatable" characters. Also lauding the novel's dialogue, Quill & Quire wrote that it "feels more authentic than most YA teen-speak, with characters holding back, not risking too much, worried about saying the wrong thing. Valero-O'Connell matches the verbal starts and stops with a multi-panel style that acts as a form of visual editing." The A.V. Club's Sava also praised Tamaki's writing, stating that she "excels when she's writing stories about young women discovering their strength in times of crisis, and Laura Dean Keeps Breaking Up with Me falls right in her creative sweet spot." While positively receiving Laura Dean, Sava found issue with one element of the novel's storytelling, writing:

One puzzling element of Laura Dean is the hallucinated dialogue that Freddy hears, usually from her mutated stuffed animals but sometimes from environmental elements like a pin-up lady printed on a shower curtain [...] the dialogue conceit and its purpose in the emotional storytelling was confusing. The lines themselves are external verbalizations of the characters' feelings, but they aren't necessary when the artwork is so good at depicting these inner states.

Of the artwork, Sava wrote "the visual storytelling is precise and thoughtful, and it's evident that the artist has spent a lot of time designing spaces that feel lived in and characters who immediately exhibit specific personalities. Lush arrangements of greenery are a key visual motif, adding an element of natural beauty to the panels while evoking different emotional responses." Quill & Quire praised the coloring work in the novel's illustrations, writing "the pages are predominantly black, white, and grey except for splashes of the most beatific shade of peachy-pink, which perfectly accentuate the bittersweet quality of this story of high-school heartache and friendship," and added "this singular [color] becomes an anticipated comfort throughout the entire story." In their review of the novel, Kirkus Reviews similarly praised the usage of color in the novel, writing that "Valero-O'Connell's art is realistic and expressive, bringing the characters to life through dynamic grayscale illustrations featuring highlights of millennial pink."

=== Awards and honors ===
Laura Dean Keeps Breaking Up with Me won the 2019 Harvey Award for Best Children's or Young Adult Book. The novel was also nominated for the Harvey Award for Book of the Year. Additionally, at the 2019 Ignatz Awards ceremony, Laura Dean won three awards–the novel won for Outstanding Graphic Novel and Outstanding Story, and Valero-O'Connell's work on the novel garnered her the Outstanding Artist award. Laura Dean was thrice honored at the 2020 Eisner Awards, with Valero-O'Connell winning Best Penciller/Inker or Penciller/Inker Team, Tamaki winning Best Writer (for Laura Dean, along with her work on Archie and Harley Quinn: Breaking Glass), and the book winning Best Publication for Teens.

The novel received a Blue Ribbon honor from The Bulletin of the Center for Children's Books. In January 2020, Laura Dean was named as Printz Honor Book, with the American Library Association writing: "Through soft-hued illustrations and cinematic scope, this graphic novel captures the intoxication of teenage love and the search for identity."

=== Year-end lists ===
Laura Dean was included in the year-end top graphic novels lists curated by several publications, including NPR, The Washington Post, and the CBC's online service among others. Publications relating to pop culture media highlighted the novel, particularly those that cater to LGBT and feminist topics such as The Advocate and Bitch. The Mary Sue also included the book in its Book Club Picks in May 2019.

The A.V. Club placed the book within its list of the 20 best comics of 2019, writing: "Rosemary Valero-O'Connell draws characters who breathe. [The reader] can feel their nervous inhale when they're about to start a tense conversation, the exhale of a longing sigh. Winding word-balloon tails ride waves of air, informing the pacing of the loaded conversations in Mariko Tamaki's script." HuffPost India listed the novel at first in its list of the 10 best graphic novels of 2019, writing: "Mariko Tamaki and Rosemary Valero-O'Connell prove just how firmly they grasp the pulse of this demographic though, with a tale that delights and moves in equal measure." The CBC selected Laura Dean as its top Canadian comic of the year.

Year-end lists
Publication	List	Ref.
The A.V. Club	The 20 best comics of 2019	
The Advocate	The Best LGBTQ Graphic Novels of 2019	
Bitch	The Best Queer YA Novels of 2019	
CBC	The best books of 2019	
CBC	The best Canadian comics of 2019	
Forbes	The Best Graphic Novels Of 2019	
HuffPost India	The 10 Best Graphic Novels Of 2019	
NPR	NPR's Favorite Books of 2019	
Salon	5 must-read graphic novels you missed last year	
The Washington Post	The best graphic novels, memoirs and story collections of 2019	

== Film adaptation ==
In December 2023, Tommy Dorfman was announced to direct a feature-length adaptation of the novel, with Tamaki writing the screenplay. In July 2025, Ava Phillippe and Sam Morelos were cast in the lead roles.
