= Something Is Killing the Children =

Ongoing comic book series

- Cover to Something Is Killing the Children #1 by Werther Dell'Edera (art) & Giovanna Niro (colors)

Publication information
- Publisher: Boom! Studios
- Schedule: Monthly
- Format: Ongoing series
- Genre: Horror
- Publication date: September 4, 2019
- No. of issues: 51 (including issue #0)
- Main character: Erica Slaughter

Creative team
- Written by: James Tynion IV
- Artist: Werther Dell'Edera
- Letterer: AndWorld Design
- Colorists: Miquel Muerto; Giovanna Niro (covers only)
- Editors: Eric Harburn; Gwen Waller (assistant)

Something Is Killing the Children is a 2019 ongoing monthly comic book series created by writer James Tynion IV and artist Werther Dell'Edera and published monthly by Boom! Studios, beginning in September 2019. The series centers around Erica Slaughter, who hunts down monsters killing children, and the secret society to which she belongs.

== Plot summary ==
=== The Archer's Peak Saga ===
(Something Is Killing the Children #1–15)

In Archer's Peak, a small town in Wisconsin, children begin to vanish and turn up dead, their bodies mutilated in horrific ways. Erica Slaughter, a mysterious woman with pale blond hair, big green eyes, and a small stuffed octopus, arrives in town, seeking a monster adults can't see. Erica is part of the Order of St. George, and one of their black masks, solo hunters trained to locate and kill monsters, and gifted with the ability to see them into adulthood. She meets James, a young boy and the lone survivor of an attack that massacred his friends, and reveals to him the truth behind their deaths and the deaths of the other children in the town, reluctantly allowing him to help her kill the monster. Their mission is complicated by a local restaurant worker Tommy Mahoney, whose sister Sophie is among the missing children and presumed dead, who becomes suspicious of Erica and James and follows them to a monster den. There, he finds Sophie's body among the corpses of the other children, and inadvertently shoots James while trying to attack Erica, believing her to be responsible. Erica stabs him with special gold, allowing him to see monsters, and they are able to kill it in the den and rescue Bian, a small girl and the only survivor in the cave. Bian then reveals that the monster they killed was the mother and that it had five babies who will also need to feed.

While Erica is focused on saving the children, the Order of Saint George is far more interested in keeping their organization a secret, willing to kill the locals if need be, sending Erica's fellow black mask Aaron to the town to cover up her breaking of the Order's rules by allowing a civilian to see the monsters. Aaron initially attempts to kill Tommy, but is convinced by Erica to help defend Archer's peak, and he is ripped apart by the monster children. In response, the head of the Chicago Order, the Dragon, dispatches Cecilia, leader of the House of Slaughter's white masks, to the town to apprehend Erica. Tommy and the local sheriff, Joe, have the townspeople hide in the school gym from the monsters while Erica has James and Bian act as bait to draw them away. Erica is able to kill the monster children, and calls off Cecilia and the white masks, who are planning to kill the locals in order to keep their organization secret. Tommy falsely confesses to murdering the children, forcing Joe to arrest him but satisfying the Order, who leave the town with a sizeable anonymous donation to rebuild. Erica meets with the Dragon and insists that more people and children would have died if not for her actions. She refuses his offer to lead the black masks of the House of Slaughter and renounces the Order altogether, departing on a bus.

=== Me and My Monster ===
(Something Is Killing the Children #16–20)

In a flashback arc, a young Erica nearly succeeds in killing a powerful monster that killed her parents and best friend. She is aided by Jessica, a black mask hunter from the Order, who shows up and seals the monster inside her stuffed octopus toy, Octo. Seeing promise in her, Jessica goes against protocol and brings Erica with her, requesting that she is given the chance to join the Order's ranks. Gary, one of the azure masks, prepares an induction ritual, though everyone aside from Aaron believe that Erica will not be strong enough to survive the trial. In her mind, the monster trapped inside Octo tries to deceive Erica and consume her while she fruitlessly searches for a way to save her family. Remembering that they are already dead, Erica stands up to the monster, passes the trial, and is inducted into the House of Slaughter, the branch of the Order based in Chicago, Illinois.

=== The Tribulation Saga ===
(Something Is Killing the Children #21–35)

Since going rogue from the Order, Erica has travelled around the country hunting monsters and protecting children with the help of Gary, who has been secretly covering her tracks and feeding her information. She travels to Tribulation, New Mexico, and forms an uneasy alliance with Gabi, a young girl whose entire family were torn apart by a shapeshifting monster, and Riqui, the girlfriend of Gabi's sister. The House of Slaughter hire the ruthless and sadistic assassin Charlotte Cutter, a black mask from England, to kill Erica. Determining that she must be getting help, Charlotte kills Gary and tracks Erica to Tribulation, where she captures a local child and allows the monster to kill him, forcing it to change shape into a copy of Erica. Charlotte poses as an Interpol agent and has the sheriff, Carter Thomas, arrest Erica for the murders of Gabi's family before killing several policemen and forcing Erica to flee before the monster kills again.

The Dragon tells Cecilia that he doesn't have long to live and that she must make a move if she wants to take over the House of Slaughter. He explains that the Order is aware that Charlotte will one day make a mess too big for them to cover up, and suggests that they will be satisfied if Charlotte is killed and Erica is convinced to return to the fold. Cecilia travels to Tribulation and gives Erica a special poison that will kill the shapeshifter and will cause Charlotte to die in agony, as revenge for killing Gary. She also tells Erica that, if she were to provide enough evidence to suggest she has died, Cecilia will have no cause to continue pursuing her when she becomes the next Dragon. A deranged Charlotte strikes just as Gabi and Riqui draw the shapeshifter to them and, though Erica is able to kill Charlotte after a brutal fight, she has already used some of the poison to infect Gabi. In an act of bravery, Gabi allows the monster to bite her, and it immediately dies from the poison in her bloodstream. Cecilia uses the corpse of the monster, still in Erica's form, to convince the Order that she and Charlotte killed each other, and encourages Carter to pin Tribulations deaths on her as well. Grief-stricken, Riqui swears that she will kill Erica for allowing Gabi to die.

=== Road Stories ===
(Something Is Killing the Children #36-40)

An arc composed of a series of one-shot stories from Erica's time as a member of the Order:

- Erica and Aaron hunt a rare monster that was created from a puppy's fear.
- In Flat Rock, South Dakota, Erica kills a monster created by a little girl in a grocery store. She tells the employees that she was duty-bound to kill any "loose ends" to keep the Order a secret, but that Jessica trained her with empathy and that she will allow them all to live as long as they don't tell anyone what they saw.
- Two girls find an injured Erica in their treehouse and are told by Octo about the existence of monsters. He offers to teach them how to hunt them while Erica's wounds are tended to by their older sister. When Erica wakes up, she tells the girls she was drunk and passed out, and encourages them to forget that they ever encountered her. She calls Aaron and tells him there's no need to send anyone from the Order, and then berates Octo for his machinations.
- Erica visits a therapist and discusses the impact of Jessica's death from alcoholism, and her inability to regulate her emotions. The therapist tells her that strong emotions like sadness and anger are a tool used by the brain to help us to remember people.
- Erica is consoled by Aaron after a particularly challenging hunt which brings up old memories of Jessica and resulted in the accidental death of a young girl.

=== All Her Monsters ===
(Something Is Killing the Children #41–)

A flashback arc set during Erica's childhood as a new inductee working under Jessica. Aaron contacts Erica, demanding to know the status of their latest mission and telling her that he's receiving increasing pressure from Cecilia to provide an update. Erica has started covering for Jessica, who is overworked as the sole adult black mask in the House of Slaughter and descending further into alcoholism, and is killing monsters on her behalf. Cecilia sends them to Valmont Mountain House, a ski resort where she, Jessica, and their mentor Adelaide had a traumatic experience in their youth. The resort's owner, Mr. Wheeler, is reluctant to close the resort despite the deaths of several children. When a young girl, Bex, is the sole survivor of another attack bringing the total number of victims to nine, Jessica poses as a member of the FBI while Erica speaks with teenage staff members Max and Barney. Adelaide grants Aaron access to the files on the Valmont mission, while Cecilia and Gary travel to check up on Jessica. Erica and Jessica argue, with Jessica telling her that she's allowed her to remain on her apprenticeship despite having already made her first kill because she knows she is struggling to let go. Erica retorts that Jessica has been so drunk that she doesn't even know which monsters she's killed herself and which Erica had to kill for her. Octo uses Erica's fear over Jessica's death to draw out the monsters, which allows Erica and Jessica to fight them off together. A flashback to the previous mission to Valmont shows that young Cecilia killed a child to protect the Order, devastating Jessica and enraging Adelaide. When Cecilia and Gary arrive, Cecilia recruits Bex into the Order instead of killing her.

== Development and publication history ==
In June 2019, Boom! Studios announced SIKTC as a five-issue limited horror series (with artist Werther Dell'Edera) to debut that September.

Something Is Killing the Children #1 was released on September 4, 2019. The publisher upgraded the title from a limited series to an ongoing monthly book before issue #1 was in shops.

=== Spinoff titles ===
Something Is Killing the Children (SIKTC) spurred a franchise that Tynion and his readers call the "Slaughterverse". In May 2021, Boom Studios released the one-shot Enter the House of Slaughter as part of Free Comic Book Day, which was set during the first six issues of the main series and functioned as an introduction to the House of Slaughter series.

House of Slaughter launched in October 2021 and ran for thirty issues through February 2025. The series alternated between two storylines: one focusing on Jace Boucher, rogue black mask, and the other on a group of red, blue, and white masks within the House of Slaughter.

On December 28, 2022, the first of three oversized one-shots in the Books of Slaughter series was published. The series focused on Maxine Slaughter's shifting from a white mask to a black mask, including spending time at the House of Butcher in New Orleans and the House of Cutter in London. Book of Slaughter #1 was followed by Book of Butcher #1 on December 27, 2023, and Book of Cutter #1 on January 29, 2025.

In September 2024, a prequel to the Archer's Peak saga, Something Is Killing the Children #0, was released with a House of Cutter violet mask investigating Erica's monster hunting activities.

A one-shot titled A Monster Hunter Walks Into A Bar was released on October 8, 2025. Originally serialized across six issues of Hello Darkness, the one-shot collects the perspectives of different people who had encountered the victims of a monster Erica recently killed.

On May 6, 2026, the first issue of the four-part miniseries Fall of the House of Slaughter was released. The miniseries was previewed in the 2026 Comic Give Away Day one-shot Road to Slaughter and picks up with where Book of Cutter ended with a focus on machinations within the House of Slaughter and who will succeed the ailing old dragon as leader of the house.

A novel, Something Is Killing the Children: Hope Is a Knife, was released on October 13, 2026. Authored by Tynion and Kiersten White, the book focuses on Erica's hunt of a possible monster in Idaho.

=== Art book ===
In December 2024, Boom Studios published The Art of Something Is Killing the Children. The book explored the creation of the seven arcs spanning issues #1–35 with creators Tynion and Dell'Edera interviewing each other throughout. It also contains a selection of covers and some of Tyion's scripts. Editor Eric Harburn indicated in the art book's introduction that he wishes to do further volumes, a point which he later clarified and reiterated on BlueSky. A companion one-shot was also released compiling variant covers not included in the main book.

=== Crossover ===
In October 2025, a crossover with DC Comics' Black Label imprint was announced for 2026, entitled Swamp Thing Is Killing the Children. Set for release December 2, 2026, the 64-page one-shot is written by Tynion with Dell'Edera providing the art.

=== Webtoon ===
In September 2025, it was announced that the comic would be rereleased in the form of a vertical scrolling webcomic on Webtoon. The digital comic launched in April 2026.

== Awards and nominations ==
Something Is Killing the Children (SIKTC) was nominated for Best New Series at the 2020 Eisner Awards, and Tynion won Eisners for Best Writer in 2021, 2022, and 2023 for his work on the series and other titles. In 2022, SIKTC tied for the Eisner Award for Best Continuing Series with Bitter Root.

Award nominations for Something Is Killing the Children
Year	Organization	Award	Result	Reference
2020	Eisner Awards	Best New Series	Nominated	
2020	Harvey Awards	Book of the Year	Nominated	
2021	Eisner Awards	Best Writer	Won	
2022	Eisner Awards	Best Writer	Won	
2022	Eisner Awards	Best Continuing Series	Won	
2022	Bram Stoker Awards	Superior Achievement in a Graphic Novel	Nominated	
2022	Ringo Awards	Best Series	Won	
2022	Ringo Awards	Best Single Issue (#20)	Won	
2023	Eisner Awards	Best Writer	Won	
2025	Eisner Awards	Best Writer	Nominated	
2026	Dragon Awards	Comic Book/Graphic Novel	Won	

== Reception and sales ==
The first 20 issues of the comic book series sold over 2 million copies within the span of 2 years. In June 2020, the series was nominated for Best New Series at the 2020 Eisner Awards, which was Tynion's first nomination.

Critics have praised Tynion's writing and Dell'Edera's moody artwork, and trade collections began topping graphic-novel bestseller lists.

By mid-2024, Boom reported that all Something-related titles combined had sold over 4.5 million copies worldwide. Boom noted at San Diego Comic-Con 2023 that House of Slaughter #1 was 2022's top-selling comic and that SIKTC Volume 1 was the second best-selling trade of the year.

Reception and sales for issues of Something Is Killing the Children
Issue	Publication date	Comic Book Roundup rating	North American retailer sales (first month)
#1	September 4, 2019	9.3 by 19 professional critics	33,648
#2	October 16, 2019	8.8 by 13 professional critics	24,644
#3	November 20, 2019	8.5 by 9 professional critics	17,353
#4	December 11, 2019	8.8 by 7 professional critics	16,079
#5	January 29, 2020	8.4 by 9 professional critics	14,047
#6	March 18, 2020	8.5 by 6 professional critics	14,365
#7	June 10, 2020	8.9 by 6 professional critics	Data not yet available
#8	July 8, 2020	8.8 by 10 professional critics	Data not yet available
#9	August 12, 2020	9.0 by 7 professional critics	Data not yet available
#10	September 9, 2020	9.2 by 5 professional critics	20,000–25,000
#11	October 21, 2020	8.7 by 5 professional critics	39,000–47,000
#12	November 18, 2020	8.8 by 7 professional critics	Data not yet available
#13	December 23, 2020	9.1 by 3 professional critics	Data not yet available
#14	January 27, 2021	9.2 by 5 professional critics	Data not yet available
#15	February 24, 2021	8.8 by 7 professional critics	Data not yet available
#16	May 26, 2021	9.1 by 7 professional critics	Data not yet available
#17	June 23, 2021	9.2 by 5 professional critics	Data not yet available
#18	July 28, 2021	9.1 by 5 professional critics	Data not yet available
#19	August 25, 2021	9.2 by 4 professional critics	Data not yet available
#20	September 22, 2021	9.4 by 4 professional critics	57,097
#21	March 30, 2022	8.6 by 4 professional critics	124,002 (Note: The sale numbers are the sum of two different cover versions of the comic.)
#22	April 27, 2022	9.2 by 4 professional critics	63,473
#23	May 25, 2022	8.3 by 3 professional critics	Data not yet available
#24	June 22, 2022	8.3 by 5 professional critics	Data not yet available
#25	July 27, 2022	9.3 by 4 professional critics	Data not yet available
#26	November 16, 2022	7.8 by 4 professional critics	Data not yet available
#27	December 21, 2022	8.5 by 5 professional critics	Data not yet available
#28	January 11, 2023	9.1 by 5 professional critics	Data not yet available
#29	February 22, 2023	8.2 by 4 professional critics	Data not yet available
#30	March 29, 2023	8.7 by 5 professional critics	Data not yet available
#31	July 19, 2023	8.5 by 7 professional critics	Data not yet available
#32	August 16, 2023	8.9 by 5 professional critics	Data not yet available
#33	September 20, 2023	8.5 by 5 professional critics	Data not yet available
#34	October 25, 2023	9.8 by 3 professional critics	Data not yet available
#35	November 29, 2023	9.2 by 3 professional critics	Data not yet available
#36	April 24, 2024	9.1 by 6 professional critics	Data not yet available
#37	May 22, 2024	9.4 by 6 professional critics	Data not yet available
#38	June 26, 2024	7.9 by 4 professional critics	Data not yet available
#39	July 24, 2024	9.1 by 5 professional critics	Data not yet available
#40	August 28, 2024	9.8 by 5 professional critics	Data not yet available
#0	November 6, 2024	9.3 by 4 professional critics	Data not yet available
#41	April 30, 2025	9.7 by 3 professional critics	Data not yet available
#42	June 11, 2025	9.3 by 3 professional critics	Data not yet available
#43	August 6, 2025	9.5 by 2 professional critics	Data not yet available
#44	October 8, 2025	9.4 by 2 professional critics	Data not yet available
#46	April 8, 2026		Data not yet available
#47	May 13, 2026		Data not yet available
#48	June 17, 2026		Data not yet available
#49	July 22, 2026		Data not yet available
#50	October 7, 2026		Data not yet available

== Collected editions ==
Collected editions of Something Is Killing the Children
Title	Material collected	Publication date	ISBN
TRADE PAPERBACKS
Something Is Killing the Children – Volume One	Something Is Killing the Children #1–5 "The Angel of Archer's Peak"	June 25, 2020	ISBN 9781684155583
Something Is Killing the Children – Volume Two	Something Is Killing the Children #6–10 "The House of Slaughter"	December 1, 2020	ISBN 9781684156498
Something Is Killing the Children – Volume Three	Something Is Killing the Children #11–15 "A Game of Nowhere"	June 15, 2021	ISBN 9781684157075
Something Is Killing the Children – Volume Four	Something Is Killing the Children #16–20 "Me and My Monster"	January 11, 2022	ISBN 9781684158041
Something Is Killing the Children – Volume Five	Something Is Killing the Children #21–25 "The Road to Tribulation"	October 18, 2022	ISBN 9781684158539
Something Is Killing the Children – Volume Six	Something Is Killing the Children #26–30 "The Girl and the Hurricane"	June 14, 2023	ISBN 9781684159031
Something Is Killing the Children – Volume Seven	Something Is Killing the Children #31–35 "Showdown at the Easy Creek Corral"	February 14, 2024	ISBN 9781608861484
Something Is Killing the Children – Volume Eight	Something Is Killing the Children #36–40 "Road Stories"	October 30, 2024	ISBN 9781684156283
Something Is Killing the Children – Volume Nine	Something Is Killing the Children #41–45 "All Her Monsters—Part I"	February 17, 2026	ISBN 9798892153683
Something Is Killing the Children – Volume Ten	Something Is Killing the Children #46–50 "All Her Monsters—Part II"	Scheduled for December 15, 2026	ISBN 9798892159050
DELUXE HARDCOVERS
Something Is Killing the Children – Book One	Something Is Killing the Children #1–15; The Archer's Peak Saga	November 16, 2021	ISBN 9781684157648 (Standard); ISBN 9781684158706 (Slipcase)
Something Is Killing the Children – Book Two	Something Is Killing the Children #21–35; The Tribulation Saga	May 21, 2024	ISBN 9781608862184 (Standard); ISBN 9781608862191 (Slipcase)
OMNIBUSES
Something Is Killing the Children – Omnibus One	Something Is Killing the Children #1–20	September 16, 2025	ISBN 9798892155625
Something Is Killing the Children – Omnibus Two	Something Is Killing the Children #21–40	August 25, 2026	ISBN 9798892158763
ART BOOKS
The Art of Something Is Killing the Children	Behind-the-scenes material for Something Is Killing the Children #1–35	December 10, 2024	ISBN 9781608865963 (Standard); ISBN 9798892154482 (Slipcase); ISBN 9798892152525 (Kickstarter)
The Art of Something Is Killing the Children Companion	Curated collection of Something Is Killing the Children covers from 2019 to 2024.	December 4, 2024	UPC 84428401240901011
SPINOFF TRADE PAPERBACKS
House of Slaughter – Volume One	House of Slaughter #1–5; The Butcher's Mark	June 21, 2022	ISBN 9781684158164
House of Slaughter – Volume Two	House of Slaughter #6–10; Scarlet	January 3, 2023	ISBN 9781684158546
House of Slaughter – Volume Three	House of Slaughter #11–15; The Butcher's Return	September 12, 2023	ISBN 9781684159123
House of Slaughter – Volume Four	House of Slaughter #16–20; Alabaster	April 23, 2024	ISBN 9781608861903
House of Slaughter – Volume Five	House of Slaughter #21–25; The Butcher's War	November 19, 2024	ISBN 9781637969816
House of Slaughter – Volume Six	House of Slaughter #26–30; Azure	May 20, 2025	ISBN 9798892153591
Fall of the House of Slaughter	Fall of the House of Slaughter #1–4	Scheduled for October 27, 2026	ISBN 9798217384013
SPINOFF DELUXE HARDBACKS
House of Slaughter – Book One	House of Slaughter #1–5, 11-15, 21-25; The Butcher's Trilogy	August 5, 2025	ISBN 9798892153706 (Standard); ISBN 9798892153713 (Slipcase)
Books of Slaughter	Book of Slaughter #1, Book of Butcher #1, and Book of Cutter #1	February 10, 2026	ISBN 9798892156783
House of Slaughter – Book Two	House of Slaughter #6–10, 16-20, 26-30; The Colors Trilogy	July 21, 2026	ISBN 9798892158596
SPINOFF OMNIBUSES
House of Slaughter Omnibus	House of Slaughter #1–30	Scheduled for June 29, 2027	ISBN 9798217385522

== Adaptation ==
In 2021, Boom announced a television adaptation at Netflix as part of the studio's first-look deal. Trevor Macy and Mike Flanagan were announced as co-writers and executive producers for the pilot, but they later stepped back from the project, citing Netflix's desire to take the project in a different direction. By early 2023, Netflix brought on German showrunners Baran bo Odar and Jantje Friese (creators of Dark and 1899) to develop the series, with Boom executives Stephen Christy and Ross Richie producing and Tynion and Dell'Edera as co-executive producers. In mid-2024, the project moved into development and pre-production.

In October 2025, Blumhouse Productions acquired the rights after Netflix released the option in late 2024. Blumhouse is set to the adapt the series into both a live-action feature film and an adult animated television series, with Tynion spearheading development of the animated series. In October 2026, it was announced that Craig Zobel had been hired to direct the film.
