= Vertigo (disambiguation) =

Vertigo is a form of dizziness.

Vertigo may also refer to:

- Acrophobia, the fear of heights, often incorrectly called "vertigo"

== Arts and entertainment ==
=== Amusement parks and rides ===
- VertiGo (ride), a defunct amusement ride at Cedar Point and Knott's Berry Farm, US
- Vertigo, a ride at Oakwood Theme Park, Wales
- Vertigo, a looping plane ride at Tivoli, Denmark

=== Fictional entities ===
- Vertigo (Marvel Comics), two Marvel Comics villains with similar powers
- Count Vertigo, a DC Comics supervillain
- Vertigo, a character in Primal Rage

=== Film ===
- Vertigo (1917 film), French title Vertige, a French silent film
- Vertigo (1935 film), a French drama film directed by Paul Schiller
- Dizziness (film), Spanish title Vértigo, a 1946 Mexican film
- Vertigo (1947 film), a French drama film directed by Richard Pottier
- Vertigo (1951 film), Spanish title Vértigo, a Spanish drama film
- Vertigo (film), a 1958 film by Alfred Hitchcock
  - Vertigo (film score), its soundtrack
  - Vertigo effect, or Dolly zoom, a special effect in film, named after the movie

=== Publications ===
- Vertigo Comics, a DC Comics imprint
- Vertigo (Sebald novel), a 1990 novel by W. G. Sebald
- Vertigo (UTS), a student newspaper at the University of Technology, Sydney
- Vertigo (wordless novel), a 1937 wordless novel by Lynd Ward

=== Plays ===
- Vertigo, 1997 play by Sean O'Connor (producer) based on the same source as the Hitchcock film
- Vértigo, play by Gastón Suárez

=== Television ===
- Vértigo (TV series), a Mexican telenovela
- "Vertigo" (The Best Years episode), an episode of The Best Years
- "Vertigo" (Arrow), an episode of Arrow
- "Vertigo", an episode of Code Lyoko

=== Music ===
- Invertigo (2000–03), an Australian hard rock band named Vertigo (1996–99)
- Le Vertigo, a rondeau for harpsichord by Joseph-Nicolas-Pancrace Royer (1703-55)

==== Albums ====
- Vertigo (Jackie McLean album), 1980
- Vertigo (Boxcar album), 1990
- Vertigo (Jesse Cook album), 1998
- Vértigo (La Ley album), 1998 (La Ley's fifth album)
- Vertigo (Chris Potter album), 1998
- Vertigo (Groove Armada album), 1999
- Vertigo (Billie Myers album), 2000
- Vertigo (Jump, Little Children album), 2001
- Vértigo (Fey album), 2002
- Vertigo (John 5 album), 2004
- Vertigo (The Necks album), 2015
- Vertigo (Eden album), 2018
- Vértigo (Pablo Alborán album), 2020
- Vertigo (Zakk Sabbath album), 2020
- Vertigo (Griff album), 2024
- Vertigo (Wand album), 2024

==== Songs ====
- "Vertigo" (Sophie Ellis-Bextor song), 2025
- "Vertigo" (Olivia Lewis song), the Maltese entry to the Eurovision Song Contest 2007
- "Vertigo" (U2 song), a 2004 song by U2
  - Vertigo Tour, U2's international tour from 2005 to 2006
  - Vertigo 2005: Live from Chicago, a DVD of a U2 concert
- "Vertigo/Relight My Fire", 1979 disco song by Dan Hartman and Loleatta Holloway
- "Vertigo", by American Hi-Fi from the American Pie 2 soundtrack
- "Vertigo", by Jason Derulo featuring Jordin Sparks from Tattoos
- "Vertigo", by The Libertines from Up the Bracket
- "Vertigo", by Monster Magnet from Dopes to Infinity
- "Vertigo", by Planet Us
- "Vertigo", by Aztec Camera from the album Dreamland
- "Vertigo", by Sarah Slean from the album Day One
- "Vertigo", by Matthew Sweet from the album Earth
- "Vertigo (Do the Demolition)", by Duran Duran from the album Notorious
- "Vertigo", by FM Belfast
- "Vertigo", by Swedish rock band Eclipse from their 2017 album Monumentum
- "Vertigo", by Dutch electro-pop singer Thomas Azier from his 2018 album Stray
- "Vertigo", by American post-metal band Deafheaven from their 2013 album Sunbather
- "Vertigo", by Canadian pop-punk band Marianas Trench from their 2006 album Fix Me
- "Vertigo", by German singer-songwriter Alice Merton, from her 2021 album S.I.D.E.S.
- "Vertigo", by Beach Bunny from the album Tunnel Vision
- "Vertigo", by Korean boyband Drippin released in 2021

=== Other arts and entertainment ===
- Vertigo (dance company), an Israeli dance company
- Vertigo, a stunt performed by David Blaine
- Vertigo, a defunct nightclub on the University of Victoria campus
- Vertigo 42, a champagne bar in Tower 42 in London
- de_vertigo, a gaming map in the Valve game Counter-Strike: Global Offensive and Counter-Strike 1.6, situated on a 51-story skyscraper

== Organisations ==
- Vertigo Entertainment, an American film production company
- Vertigo Films, a British film production and film distribution company
- Vertigo Records, a UK-based record label

== Other uses ==
- Vertigo (gastropod), a genus of minute land snails
- Vertigo, the 5th century ascetic practice of standing on towers; See Stylite
- Vertigo, an automobile by Gillet
- Seedwings Europe Vertigo, an Austrian hang glider design of the mid-2000s
- Vertigo, a discontinued lollipop produced by Topps that consisted of one half chocolate, one half hard candy
- Vertiginous question, a philosophical question

== See also ==
- Cranfield Vertigo, 1980s British human-powered helicopter
- O Vertigo!, a 2014 album by Kate Miller-Heidke
