= Eisner Award for Best Black-and-White Series =

Comics award for "creative achievement"

- Awarded for: Best Black-and-White Series
- Country: United States
- First award: 1988
- Website: www.comic-con.org/awards/eisner-awards/

The Eisner Award for Best Black-and-White Series was an award for "creative achievement" in American comic books. It was given out in 1988, 1989, and 1991.

Series published in black and white were also eligible for the Eisner Award for Best Continuing Series and there was considerable overlap between the two categories. Titles nominated for both awards include Concrete, Love and Rockets, and Zot! (1988), Concrete, Love and Rockets, and "Omaha" the Cat Dancer (1989), and Cerebus, Eightball, and Zot! (1991).

== Winners and nominees ==
| Year | Title | Creators | Ref. |
|---|---|---|---|
1980s
| 1988 | Concrete (Dark Horse Comics) | Paul Chadwick | |
| 1988 | Cerebus (Aardvark-Vanaheim) | Dave Sim and Gerhard | |
| 1988 | Eddy Current (Mad Dog Graphics) | Ted McKeever | |
| 1988 | Love and Rockets (Fantagraphics) | Jaime Hernández and Gilbert Hernández | |
| 1988 | Zot! (Eclipse Comics) | Scott McCloud | |
| 1989 | Concrete (Dark Horse Comics) | Paul Chadwick | |
| 1989 | Kings in Disguise (Kitchen Sink Press) | James Vance and Dan Burr | |
| 1989 | Love and Rockets (Fantagraphics) | Jaime Hernández and Gilbert Hernández | |
| 1989 | "Omaha" the Cat Dancer (Kitchen Sink Press) | Reed Waller and Kate Worley | |
| 1989 | Xenozoic Tales (Kitchen Sink Press) | Mark Schultz | |
1990s
| 1990 | There was no Eisner Award ceremony, or awards distributed, in 1990, due to widespread balloting mix-ups. | | |
| 1991 | Xenozoic Tales (Kitchen Sink Press) | Mark Schultz | |
| 1991 | Cerebus (Aardvark-Vanaheim) | Dave Sim and Gerhard | |
| 1991 | Eightball (Fantagraphics) | Dan Clowes | |
| 1991 | Hate (Fantagraphics) | Peter Bagge | |
| 1991 | "Omaha" the Cat Dancer (Kitchen Sink Press) | Reed Waller and Kate Worley | |
| 1991 | Zot! (Eclipse Comics) | Scott McCloud | |
