= Giant Days =

Comic series created by John Allison

Publication information
- Publisher: Boom! Studios
- Schedule: Monthly
- Format: Limited series
- Genre: Varsity comedy
- Publication date: 2011 (webcomic); 2015–2019 (comic book)
- No. of issues: 54 +3 webcomics +4 specials

Creative team
- Created by: John Allison
- Written by: John Allison
- Artist(s): John Allison (webcomic, issue 48); Lissa Treiman (issues 1–6); Max Sarin (issues 7–37, 40–47, 49–54); Julia Madrigal (issues 38–39)
- Inker: Liz Fleming (issues 13–35)
- Letterer: Jim Campbell (Boom)
- Colorist: Whitney Cogar (Boom)

Giant Days is a comedic comic book written by John Allison, with art by Max Sarin and Lissa Treiman. The series follows three young British women – Esther de Groot, Susan Ptolemy and Daisy Wooton – who share a hall of residence at university. Originally created as a webcomic spin-off from his previous series Scary Go Round, and then self-published as a series of small press comics, Giant Days was subsequently picked up by Boom! Studios first as a six-issue miniseries and then as a monthly ongoing series. In 2016 Giant Days was nominated for two Eisner Awards and four Harvey Awards. In 2019, it won two Eisner awards, for Best Continuing Series and Best Humor Publication.

== Creation ==
=== Webcomic ===
Giant Days is part of the same universe as Allison's previous series Bobbins and Scary Go Round. When Scary Go Round came to an end in 2009, Allison followed it with the series Bad Machinery. However, Bad Machinery – a mystery series about school-aged sleuths – was a departure from Scary Go Round, which had focused on a group of twenty-somethings, and Allison worried that the new series might alienate his audience. In case Bad Machinery failed, Allison began planning a second series based on the character of Esther de Groot from Scary Go Round. Although Bad Machinery ultimately proved to be a success, he produced three short Giant Days stories between chapters of Bad Machinery. These were subsequently printed and sold by Allison.

=== Ongoing series ===
In 2013, Boom! Studios launched "Boom! Box", an imprint for experimental comics from established artists outside the comics industry. Allison, who was friends with Boom! editor Shannon Watters after catching her when she fell at a convention, saw Boom! Box as a good fit for continuing the Giant Days story and pitched it. The series was initially picked up as a six-issue limited series with pencilling by Disney animator Lissa Treiman (who had previously written a guest comic for Scary Go Round). This was Allison's first time writing a comic but not drawing it. Giant Days was a success, and after the final issue of the miniseries was picked up as an ongoing series, with Max Sarin replacing Treiman (although Treiman remained the cover artist until issue 24). Allison announced the end of the series at issue 55. Later this was clarified as ending at issue #54, with a special over-sized issue As Time Goes By wrapping up the series.

== Setting ==
Giant Days is set at the University of Sheffield and has a more realistic, less paranormal atmosphere than Allison's other comics, which take place in the fictional town of Tackleford. The series begins with Scary Go Round character Esther de Groot, a melodramatic goth, moving into her hall of residence and befriending her new neighbours: the cheerful homeschooled Daisy Wooton and the prickly but grounded Susan Ptolemy. The three webcomic storylines focus on Esther, as she is targeted by a gang of private school head girls, breaks up with her school boyfriend, and joins a black metal society. In the comic book series, Susan initially was the viewpoint character although the series remains an ensemble.

The series takes place over three years of university, with roughly every six issues corresponding to a single semester—the hardcover "Library Edition" releases of the series are titled based on the semesters, but their contents do not correspond exactly, as they collect the nine semesters across just seven volumes. Special issues are written to slot in at various points in the timeline. Allison stated that the definitive timeline was to "lend structure to it. Because you never see them at university really. They only attend a few classes in the course of 54 issues. In 1,200 pages or whatever, you never really see them doing any serious book learning. The series is about domesticity. In order to move them through the different phases of their domesticity, the dorms in the first year, co-living in the second year, them being split apart in the third year. It was a way to explore three different ways of a college friendship existing."

== Characters ==
=== Main ===
==== Esther de Groot ====
Esther is tall, slim, pale, and goth. She is an English Literature student who loves black metal. She is proficient in boxing and is often seen falling in and out of love with various young men. Her friends consider her to be a drama queen, but she is also a very loyal and protective friend.

==== Susan Ptolemy ====
Susan is shorter and more of a tomboy than the other women. She grew up in Northampton, smokes a lot and adopts a tough attitude but is secretly very sensitive. Though she is a medical student, Susan also has a reputation for being very careless and her roommates are constantly trying to get her to clean her filthy room and laptop. At the beginning of the series, she is secretly in love with her childhood friend McGraw, whom she later dates. She is very caring for her friends.

==== Daisy Wooton ====
Daisy is biracial and tall with curly/frizzy orangish hair and glasses, studying Archaeology. She is an orphan whose parents disappeared in a plane crash in the Bermuda Triangle while returning from a Doctors Without Borders mission in Haiti, after which she was raised and homeschooled by her British West Indian grandmother, to whom she struggles to come out as a lesbian, but eventually does. Daisy struggles with her sexuality and eventually finds a steady female partner. Her friends see her as an innocent, wide-eyed optimist. She is very sweet and always tries to see the best in people, but has a violent side (especially when drunk).

=== Secondary ===
==== Graham McGraw ====
A fellow student and childhood friend/enemy of Susan's from Northampton who eventually dates her. He is very serious, mature, and an excellent handyman who often helps the girls do odd jobs around their apartment when they move off-campus.

==== Ed Gemmell ====
A fellow student who harbours an unrequited crush on Esther. He is also a friend and roommate of McGraw's.

== Reception ==
Giant Days was well received, with reviewers especially positive about its depiction of women. Oliver Sava of The A.V. Club noted that "College-aged women are a demographic woefully underserved in the world of monthly comics, so when a new title caters to this group, it immediately stands out" and that "Women make up a large portion of Disney fandom, and hiring a Disney animator for Giant Days gives the book a visual sensibility that will appeal to those fans while presenting a story they don’t get to see in the Disney house style." Janelle Asselin writing for ComicsAlliance praised its depiction of online shaming while Comic Bastards singled out the depth of the characters, in particular the sympathetic treatment of Daisy's homeschooling and the nuance of her coming-out arc. David Nieves, reviewing the first issue for Comics Beat, described Treiman's art as having the "emotional grandiose [sic] of Scott Pilgrim" and the writing as having "the feminine voice of HBO’s GIRLS", both with a newspaper comic strip influence, but noted that "a slice of life story needs a little more emotional stakes".

=== Awards ===
- 2016 Eisner Awards: Nominated for Best Limited Series
- 2016 Eisner Awards: Nominated for Best Writer/Artist (John Allison)
- 2016 Harvey Awards: Nominated for Best New Series
- 2016 Harvey Awards: Nominated for Most Promising New Talent (Lissa Treiman)
- 2016 Harvey Awards: Nominated for Best Original Graphic Publication for Younger Readers
- 2016 Harvey Awards: Nominated for Best Continuing or Limited Series
- 2018 Eisner Awards: Nominated for Best Continuing Series
- 2019 Eisner Awards: Best Continuing Series
- 2019 Eisner Awards: Best Humor Publication
- 2019 Eisner Awards: Nominated for Best Lettering

== Issues ==
Issue	Publication date	Pencils	Inks	Cover	Year	Semester
Webcomics
Self-published #1	2011	John Allison (including colors)			First	Autumn
Self-published #2	2013	John Allison (including colors)			First	Autumn
Self-published #3	2013	John Allison (including colors)			First	Autumn
Boom! Box
#1	18 March 2015	Lissa Treiman			First	Autumn
#2	5 April 2015	Lissa Treiman			First	Autumn
#3	13 May 2015	Lissa Treiman			First	Autumn
#4	17 June 2015	Lissa Treiman			First	Autumn
#5	15 July 2015	Lissa Treiman			First	Autumn
2016 Holiday Special	26 October 2016	"What Would Have Happened If Esther, Daisy, and Susan Hadn't Become Friends (And It Was Christmas)?"; Lissa Treiman; Set in October to match month of publication.		Lissa Treiman	First	Autumn
2016 Holiday Special	26 October 2016	"How the Fishman Despoiled Christmas"; Caanan Grall; Colors: Jeremy Lawson		Lissa Treiman	First	Christmas
#6	19 August 2015	Lissa Treiman			First	Christmas
#7	21 October 2015	Max Sarin		Lissa Treiman	First	Winter
#8	18 November 2015	Max Sarin		Lissa Treiman	First	Winter
#9	9 December 2015	Max Sarin		Lissa Treiman	First	Winter
BOOM! Box Mix Tape 2015	16 December 2015	"Fridge Raider"; John Allison		N/A	First	Unconfirmed
#10	6 January 2016	Max Sarin		Lissa Treiman	First	Winter
#11	3 February 2016	Max Sarin		Lissa Treiman	First	Winter
#12	2 March 2016	Max Sarin		Lissa Treiman	First	Winter
#13	6 April 2016	Max Sarin	Liz Fleming	Lissa Treiman	First	Easter
#14	4 May 2016	Max Sarin	Liz Fleming	Lissa Treiman	First	Spring
#15	1 June 2016	Max Sarin	Liz Fleming	Lissa Treiman	First	Spring
#16	6 July 2016	Max Sarin	Liz Fleming	Lissa Treiman	First	Spring
#17	3 August 2016	Max Sarin	Liz Fleming	Lissa Treiman	First	Spring
#18	7 September 2016	Max Sarin	Liz Fleming	Lissa Treiman	First	Spring
#19	5 October 2016	Max Sarin	Liz Fleming	Lissa Treiman	First	Summer
#20	2 November 2016	Max Sarin	Liz Fleming	Lissa Treiman	Second	Autumn
Self-published #4	7 February 2022	"Snooker Could Be Better"; John Allison; Originally pitched as a Giant Days/Batman crossover in 2016. Later given a special limited run in October 2023.			Second	Autumn
BOOM! Box Mix Tape 2016	7 December 2016	"Music Is Important"; John Allison		N/A	Second	Autumn
#21	7 December 2016	Max Sarin	Liz Fleming	Lissa Treiman	Second	Autumn
#22	4 January 2017	Max Sarin	Liz Fleming	Lissa Treiman	Second	Autumn
#23	1 February 2017	Max Sarin	Liz Fleming	Lissa Treiman	Second	Autumn
#24	1 March 2017	Max Sarin	Liz Fleming	Lissa Treiman	Second	Autumn
2017 Holiday Special	22 November 2017	"Love? Ack, Shelly!"; Jenn St-Onge; Colors: Sarah Stern			Second	Autumn
#25	5 April 2017	Max Sarin	Liz Fleming	Max Sarin	Second	Christmas
#26	3 May 2017	Max Sarin	Liz Fleming	Max Sarin	Second	Winter
#27	7 June 2017	Max Sarin	Liz Fleming	Max Sarin	Second	Winter
#28	5 July 2017	Max Sarin	Liz Fleming	Max Sarin	Second	Winter
#29	2 August 2017	Max Sarin	Liz Fleming	Max Sarin	Second	Winter
#30	6 September 2017	Max Sarin	Liz Fleming	Max Sarin	Second	Winter
#31	4 October 2017	Max Sarin	Liz Fleming	Max Sarin	Second	Spring
#32	1 November 2017	Max Sarin	Liz Fleming	Max Sarin	Second	Spring
#33	6 December 2017	Max Sarin	Liz Fleming	Max Sarin	Second	Spring
#34	3 January 2018	Max Sarin	Liz Fleming	Max Sarin	Second	Spring
#35	7 February 2018	Max Sarin	Liz Fleming	Max Sarin	Second	Spring
#36	7 March 2018	Max Sarin			Second	Spring
#37	4 April 2018	Max Sarin			Second	Summer
#38	2 May 2018	Julia Madrigal		Max Sarin	Third	Autumn
#39	6 June 2018	Julia Madrigal		Max Sarin	Third	Autumn
#40	4 July 2018	Max Sarin			Third	Autumn
#41	1 August 2018	Max Sarin			Third	Autumn
#42	5 September 2018	Max Sarin			Third	Autumn
#43	3 October 2018	Max Sarin			Third	Autumn
2018 Holiday Special	5 December 2018	"Where Women Glow and Men Plunder"; John Allison			Third	Christmas
#44	7 November 2018	Max Sarin			Third	Winter
#45	12 December 2018	Max Sarin			Third	Winter
#46	2 January 2019	Max Sarin			Third	Winter
#47	6 February 2019	Max Sarin			Third	Winter
#48	6 March 2019	John Allison		Max Sarin	Third	Winter
#49	3 April 2019	Max Sarin			Third	Easter
#50	1 May 2019	Max Sarin			Third	Spring
#51	5 June 2019	Max Sarin			Third	Spring
#52	3 July 2019	Max Sarin			Third	Spring
#53	7 August 2019	Max Sarin			Third	Spring
#54	4 September 2019	Max Sarin			Third	Summer
As Time; Goes By	30 October 2019	Max Sarin			Epilogue	

== Collected editions ==
The series has so far been assembled into the collections listed below:

=== Trade paperbacks ===
Title	Material collected	Publication date	ISBN
Giant Days – Volume One	Giant Days #1–4	18 November 2015	9781608867899
Giant Days – Volume Two	Giant Days #5–8	30 March 2016	9781608868049
Giant Days – Volume Three	Giant Days #9–12	28 September 2016	9781608868513
Giant Days – Volume Four	Giant Days #13–16	1 March 2017	9781608869381
Giant Days – Volume Five	Giant Days #17–20	7 June 2017	9781608869824
Giant Days – Volume Six	Giant Days #21–24	11 October 2017	9781684150281
Giant Days – Volume Seven	Giant Days #25–28	14 March 2018	9781684151318
Giant Days: Extra Credit – Volume One	Giant Days: 2016 Holiday Special; Giant Days: 2017 Holiday Special; "Fridge Raider" (BOOM! Box Mix Tape 2015 short story); "Music Is Important" (BOOM! Box Mix Tape 2016 short story); Destroy History (webcomic strips)	13 June 2018	9781684152223
Giant Days – Volume Eight	Giant Days #29–32	15 August 2018	9781684152070
Giant Days: Early Registration	Giant Days #1–3 (webcomic)	December, 2018	9781684152650
Giant Days – Volume Nine	Giant Days #33–36	6 February 2019	9781684153107
Giant Days – Volume Ten	Giant Days #37–40	12 June 2019	9781684153718
Giant Days – Volume Eleven	Giant Days #41–44; Giant Days: 2018 Holiday Special	25 September 2019	9781684154371
Giant Days – Volume Twelve	Giant Days #45–48	29 January 2020	9781684154845
Giant Days – Volume Thirteen	Giant Days #49–52	3 June 2020	9781684155422
Giant Days – Volume Fourteen	Giant Days #53–54; Giant Days: As Time Goes By	14 October 2020	9781684156054

=== Hardcovers ===
Title	Material collected	Publication date	ISBN
Giant Days: Library Edition - Volume 1 ("Fall Semester, First Year")	Giant Days #1–8; Giant Days #1 (webcomic); "Fridge Raider" (BOOM! Box Mix Tape 2015 short story)	5 September 2023	9781684159598
Giant Days: Library Edition - Volume 2 ("Winter Semester, First Year")	Giant Days #9–16; Giant Days #2 (webcomic); "Music Is Important" (BOOM! Box Mix Tape 2016 short story)	19 September 2023	9781684159604
Giant Days: Library Edition - Volume 3 ("Spring Semester, First Year")	Giant Days #17–24; Giant Days #3 (webcomic)	17 October 2023	9781684159611
Giant Days: Library Edition - Volume 4 ("Fall Semester, Second Year")	Giant Days #25–32; "What Would Have Happened If Esther, Daisy, and Susan Hadn't Become Friends (And It Was Christmas)?"; "How the Fishman Despoiled Christmas"	7 November 2023	9781684159628
Giant Days: Library Edition - Volume 5 ("Spring Semester, Second Year")	Giant Days #33–40; "Love? Ack, Shelly!"	12 December 2023	9781684159635
Giant Days: Library Edition - Volume 6 ("Fall Semester, Third Year")	Giant Days #41–48; "Where Women Glow and Men Plunder"	9 January 2024	9781684159642
Giant Days: Library Edition - Volume 7 ("Spring Semester, Third Year")	Giant Days #49–54; Giant Days: As Time Goes By; "Destroy History"	13 February 2024	9781684159659

== Prose novel ==
A prose novel based on the series, also titled Giant Days, and written by Non Pratt, was released in 2018.
