= Eisner Award for Best Continuing Series =

Comics award for "creative achievement"

- Awarded for: Best Continuing Series
- Country: United States
- First award: 1988
- Most recent winner: Absolute Batman, by Scott Snyder, Nick Dragotta, and others
- Website: www.comic-con.org/awards/eisner-awards/

The Eisner Award for Best Continuing Series is an award for "creative achievement" in American comic books. It has been given out every year since 1988.

A title must have had at least two issues published in the previous year to eligible for the award.

== Winners and nominees ==
| Year | Title | Creators | Ref. |
|---|---|---|---|
1990s
| 1988 | Concrete (Dark Horse Comics) | Paul Chadwick | |
| 1988 | Grendel (Comico) | Matt Wagner, Arnold Pander, Jacob Pander, and Jay Geldof | |
| 1988 | Love and Rockets (Fantagraphics) | Jaime Hernandez and Gilbert Hernandez | |
| 1988 | Zot! (Eclipse Comics) | Scott McCloud | |
| 1989 | Concrete (Dark Horse Comics) | Paul Chadwick | |
| 1989 | Love and Rockets (Fantagraphics) | Jaime Hernandez and Gilbert Hernandez | |
| 1989 | Nexus (First Comics) | Mike Baron, Steve Rude and various artists | |
| 1989 | "Omaha" the Cat Dancer (Kitchen Sink Press) | Reed Waller and Kate Worley | |
| 1989 | The Question (DC Comics) | Dennis O'Neil, Denys Cowan, and Rick Magyar | |
1990s
| 1990 | There was no Eisner Award ceremony, or awards distributed, in 1990, due to widespread balloting mix-ups. | | |
| 1991 | The Sandman (DC Comics) | Neil Gaiman and various artists | |
| 1991 | Cerebus the Aardvark (Aardvark-Vanaheim) | Dave Sim, Gerhard | |
| 1991 | Eightball (Fantagraphics) | Dan Clowes | |
| 1991 | Miracleman (Eclipse Comics) | Alan Moore and various artists | |
| 1991 | Yummy Fur (Vortex Comics) | Chester Brown | |
| 1991 | Zot! (Eclipse Comics) | Scott McCloud | |
| 1992 | The Sandman (DC Comics) | Neil Gaiman and various artists | |
| 1992 | Cerebus the Aardvark (Aardvark-Vanaheim) | Dave Sim, Gerhard | |
| 1992 | Doom Patrol (DC Comics) | Grant Morrison, Richard Case and various artists | |
| 1992 | Flaming Carrot (Renegade Press) | Bob Burden | |
| 1992 | Groo the Wanderer (Marvel Comics/Epic Comics) | Mark Evanier and Sergio Aragonés | |
| 1992 | Miracleman (Eclipse Comics) | Neil Gaiman, Mark Buckingham, and Sam Parsons | |
| 1992 | The Incredible Hulk (Marvel Comics) | Peter David and Dale Keown | |
| 1992 | Love and Rockets (Fantagraphics) | Jaime Hernandez and Gilbert Hernandez | |
| 1992 | Yummy Fur (Drawn & Quarterly) | Chester Brown | |
| 1993 | The Sandman (DC Comics) | Neil Gaiman and various artists | |
| 1993 | Cerebus the Aardvark (Aardvark-Vanaheim) | Dave Sim, Gerhard | |
| 1993 | Hate (Fantagraphics) | Peter Bagge | |
| 1993 | Hellblazer (DC Comics) | Garth Ennis and various artists | |
| 1993 | Love and Rockets (Fantagraphics) | Gilbert Hernandez and Jaime Hernandez | |
| 1993 | Real Stuff (Fantagraphics) | Dennis Eichhorn and others | |
| 1993 | Shade, the Changing Man (DC Comics) | Peter Milligan and various artists | |
| 1994 | Bone (Cartoon Books) | Jeff Smith | |
| 1994 | Cerebus the Aardvark (Aardvark-Vanaheim) | Dave Sim and Gerhard | |
| 1994 | Hellblazer (DC Comics/Vertigo Comics) | Garth Ennis and Steve Dillon | |
| 1994 | The Sandman (DC Comics/Vertigo Comics) | Neil Gaiman | |
| 1994 | Shade, the Changing Man (DC Comics/Vertigo Comics) | Peter Milligan and Chris Bachalo | |
| 1995 | Bone (Cartoon Books) | Jeff Smith | |
| 1995 | The Books of Magic (DC Comics/Vertigo Comics) | John Ney Rieber, Gary Amaro, and Peter Gross | |
| 1995 | Icon (Milestone) | Dwayne McDuffie and M. D. Bright | |
| 1995 | Starman (DC Comics) | James Robinson and Tony Harris | |
| 1995 | Strangers in Paradise (Abstract Studio) | Terry Moore | |
| 1995 | Uncle Scrooge (Gladstone Publishing) | Don Rosa and others | |
| 1996 | Acme Novelty Library (Fantagraphics) | Chris Ware | |
| 1996 | Astro City (Jukebox Productions/Image Comics) | Kurt Busiek and Brent Anderson | |
| 1996 | Preacher (DC Comics/Vertigo Comics) | Garth Ennis and Steve Dillon | |
| 1996 | Strangers in Paradise (Abstract Studio) | Terry Moore | |
| 1996 | Stray Bullets (El Capitan Books) | David Lapham | |
| 1997 | Astro City (Jukebox Productions/Homage Comics) | Kurt Busiek, Brent Anderson, and Will Blyberg | |
| 1997 | Akiko (Sirius Entertainment) | Mark Crilley | |
| 1997 | Kane (Dancing Elephant Press) | Paul Grist | |
| 1997 | Starman (DC Comics) | James Robinson, Tony Harris, and Wade Von Grawbadger | |
| 1997 | Strangehaven (Abiogenesis Press) | Gary Spencer Millidge | |
| 1997 | Strangers in Paradise (Abstract Studio/Homage Comics) | Terry Moore | |
| 1998 | Astro City (Jukebox Productions/Homage Comics) | Kurt Busiek, Brent Anderson, and Will Blyberg | |
| 1998 | Acme Novelty Library (Fantagraphics) | Chris Ware | |
| 1998 | Akiko (Sirius Entertainment) | Mark Crilley | |
| 1998 | Bone (Cartoon Books) | Jeff Smith | |
| 1998 | Leave It to Chance (Homage Comics) | James Robinson and Paul Smith | |
| 1998 | Preacher (DC Comics/Vertigo Comics) | Garth Ennis and Steve Dillon | |
| 1999 | Preacher (DC Comics/Vertigo Comics) | Garth Ennis and Steve Dillon | |
| 1999 | Avengers (Marvel Comics) | Kurt Busiek, George Pérez, and Al Vey | |
| 1999 | Kurt Busiek's Astro City (Homage Comics/WildStorm/Image Comics) | Kurt Busiek, Brent Anderson, and Will Blyberg | |
| 1999 | Sandman Mystery Theatre (DC Comics/Vertigo Comics) | Steven T. Seagle and Guy Davis | |
| 1999 | Transmetropolitan (DC Comics/Vertigo Comics) | Warren Ellis, Darick Robertson, and Rodney Ramos | |
2000s
| 2000 | Acme Novelty Library (Fantagraphics) | Chris Ware | |
| 2000 | Planetary (DC Comics/WildStorm) | Warren Ellis and John Cassaday | |
| 2000 | Preacher (DC Comics/Vertigo Comics) | Garth Ennis and Steve Dillon | |
| 2000 | Promethea (America's Best Comics) | Alan Moore, J. H. Williams III, and Mick Gray | |
| 2000 | Top 10 (America's Best Comics) | Alan Moore, Gene Ha, and Zander Cannon | |
| 2000 | Transmetropolitan (DC Comics/Vertigo Comics) | Warren Ellis, Darick Robertson, and Rodney Ramos | |
| 2001 | Top 10 (America's Best Comics) | Alan Moore, Gene Ha, and Zander Cannon | |
| 2001 | Age of Bronze (Image Comics) | Eric Shanower | |
| 2001 | Berlin (Drawn & Quarterly) | Jason Lutes | |
| 2001 | Eagle: The Making of an Asian-American President (Viz Media) | Kaiji Kawaguchi | |
| 2001 | Promethea (America's Best Comics) | Alan Moore, J. H. Williams III, and Mick Gray | |
| 2002 | 100 Bullets (DC Comics/Vertigo Comics) | Brian Azzarello and Eduardo Risso | |
| 2002 | Finder (Lightspeed Press) | Carla Speed McNeil | |
| 2002 | Planetary (DC Comics/WildStorm) | Warren Ellis and John Cassaday | |
| 2002 | Queen & Country (Oni Press) | Greg Rucka and Steve Rolston | |
| 2002 | Ruse (CrossGen) | Mark Waid, Butch Guice, and Mike Perkins | |
| 2003 | Daredevil (Marvel Comics) | Brian Michael Bendis and Alex Maleev | |
| 2003 | Age of Bronze (Image Comics) | Eric Shanower | |
| 2003 | Fables (DC Comics/Vertigo Comics) | Bill Willingham, Lan Medina, Mark Buckingham, and Steve Leialoha | |
| 2003 | Louis Riel (Drawn & Quarterly) | Chester Brown | |
| 2003 | Strangers in Paradise (Abstract Studio) | Terry Moore | |
| 2003 | True Story, Swear to God (Clib's Boy Comics) | Tom Beland | |
| 2004 | 100 Bullets (DC Comics/Vertigo Comics) | Brian Azzarello and Eduardo Risso | |
| 2004 | Alias (Marvel Comics) | Brian Michael Bendis and Michael Gaydos | |
| 2004 | Daredevil (Marvel Comics) | Brian Michael Bendis, Alex Maleev, and David W. Mack | |
| 2004 | The Goon (Dark Horse Comics) | Eric Powell | |
| 2004 | Gotham Central (DC Comics) | Ed Brubaker, Greg Rucka, Michael Lark, Brian Hurtt, and Stefano Gaudiano | |
| 2004 | Queen & Country (Oni Press) | Greg Rucka, Jason Alexander, Carla Speed McNeil, and Mike Hawthorne | |
| 2005 | The Goon (Dark Horse Comics) | Eric Powell | |
| 2005 | Astonishing X-Men (Marvel Comics) | Joss Whedon and John Cassaday | |
| 2005 | Ex Machina (WildStorm/DC Comics) | Brian K. Vaughan, Tony Harris, and Tom Fesiter | |
| 2005 | Stray Bullets (El Capitan Books) | David Lapham | |
| 2005 | Y: The Last Man (Vertigo Comics/DC Comics) | Brian K. Vaughan, Pia Guerra, and José Marzan Jr. | |
| 2006 | Astonishing X-Men (Marvel Comics) | Joss Whedon and John Cassaday | |
| 2006 | Age of Bronze (Image Comics) | Eric Shanower | |
| 2006 | Ex Machina (WildStorm/DC Comics) | Brian K. Vaughan, Tony Harris, and Tom Feister | |
| 2006 | Fell (Image Comics) | Warren Ellis and Ben Templesmith | |
| 2006 | Rocketo (Speakeasy Comics) | Frank Espinosa | |
| 2006 | True Story, Swear to God (Clib's Boy Comics) | Tom Beland | |
| 2007 | All-Star Superman (DC Comics) | Grant Morrison and Frank Quitely | |
| 2007 | Captain America (Marvel Comics) | Ed Brubaker and Steve Epting | |
| 2007 | Daredevil (Marvel Comics) | Ed Brubaker, Michael Lark, and Stefano Gaudiano | |
| 2007 | Monster (Viz Media) | Naoki Urasawa | |
| 2007 | The Walking Dead (Image Comics) | Robert Kirkman and Charlie Adlard | |
| 2007 | Young Avengers (Marvel Comics) | Allan Heinberg, Jim Cheung, and various inkers | |
| 2008 | Y: The Last Man (Vertigo Comics/DC Comics) | Brian K. Vaughan, Pia Guerra, and Jose Marzan, Jr. | |
| 2008 | The Boys (Dynamite Entertainment) | Garth Ennis and Darick Robertson | |
| 2008 | Buffy the Vampire Slayer Season Eight (Dark Horse Comics) | Joss Whedon, Brian K. Vaughan, Georges Jeanty, and Andy Owens | |
| 2008 | Monster (Viz Media) | Naoki Urasawa | |
| 2008 | The Spirit (DC Comics) | Darwyn Cooke | |
| 2009 | All-Star Superman (DC Comics) | Grant Morrison and Frank Quitely | |
| 2009 | Fables (Vertigo Comics/DC Comics) | Bill Willingham, Mark Buckingham, Steve Leialoha, Niko Henrichon, Andrew Pepoy, and Peter Gross | |
| 2009 | Monster (Viz Media) | Naoki Urasawa | |
| 2009 | Thor (Marvel Comics) | J. Michael Straczynski, Olivier Coipel, Mark Morales, and various | |
| 2009 | Usagi Yojimbo (Dark Horse Comics) | Stan Sakai | |
2010s
| 2010 | The Walking Dead (Image Comics) | Robert Kirkman and Charlie Adlard | |
| 2010 | Fables (Vertigo Comics/DC Comics) | Bill Willingham, Mark Buckingham, Steve Leialoha, Andrew Pepoy et al. | |
| 2010 | Irredeemable (Boom! Studios) | Mark Waid and Peter Krause | |
| 2010 | 20th Century Boys (Viz Media) | Naoki Urasawa | |
| 2010 | The Unwritten (Vertigo Comics/DC Comics) | Mike Carey and Peter Gross | |
| 2011 | Chew (Image Comics) | John Layman and Rob Guillory | |
| 2011 | Echo (Abstract Studio) | Terry Moore | |
| 2011 | Locke & Key (IDW Publishing) | Joe Hill and Gabriel Rodriguez | |
| 2011 | Morning Glories (Shadowline/Image Comics) | Nick Spencer and Joe Eisma | |
| 2011 | 20th Century Boys (Viz Media) | Naoki Urasawa | |
| 2011 | Scalped (Vertigo Comics/DC Comics) | Jason Aaron and R. M. Guéra | |
| 2012 | Daredevil (Marvel Comics) | Mark Waid, Marcos Martín, Paolo Rivera, and Joe Rivera | |
| 2012 | 20th Century Boys (Viz Media) | Naoki Urasawa | |
| 2012 | Rachel Rising (Abstract Studio) | Terry Moore | |
| 2012 | Ultimate Comics: Spider-Man (Marvel Comics) | Brian Michael Bendis and Sara Pichelli | |
| 2012 | Usagi Yojimbo (Dark Horse Comics) | Stan Sakai | |
| 2013 | Saga (Image Comics) | Brian K. Vaughan and Fiona Staples | |
| 2013 | Fatale (Image Comics) | Ed Brubaker and Sean Phillips | |
| 2013 | Hawkeye (Marvel Comics) | Matt Fraction and David Aja | |
| 2013 | The Manhattan Projects (Image Comics) | Jonathan Hickman and Nick Pitarra | |
| 2013 | Prophet (Image Comics) | Brandon Graham and Simon Roy | |
| 2014 | Saga (Image Comics) | Brian K. Vaughan and Fiona Staples | |
| 2014 | East of West (Image Comics) | Jonathan Hickman and Nick Dragotta | |
| 2014 | Hawkeye (Marvel Comics) | Matt Fraction and David Aja | |
| 2014 | Nowhere Men (Image Comics) | Eric Stephenson and Nate Bellegarde | |
| 2014 | Sex Criminals (Image Comics) | Matt Fraction and Chip Zdarsky | |
| 2015 | Saga (Image Comics) | Brian K. Vaughan and Fiona Staples | |
| 2015 | Astro City (Vertigo Comics) | Kurt Busiek and Brent Anderson | |
| 2015 | Bandette (MonkeyBrain Books) | Paul Tobin and Colleen Coover | |
| 2015 | Hawkeye (Marvel Comics) | Matt Fraction and David Aja | |
| 2015 | Southern Bastards (Image Comics) | Jason Aaron and Jason Latour | |
| 2015 | The Walking Dead (Image Comics/Skybound Entertainment) | Robert Kirkman, Charlie Adlard, and Stefano Gaudiano | |
| 2016 | Southern Bastards (Image Comics) | Jason Aaron and Jason Latour | |
| 2016 | Bandette (MonkeyBrain Books) | Paul Tobin and Colleen Coover | |
| 2016 | Giant Days (Boom! Studios) | John Allison, Lissa Treiman, and Max Sarin | |
| 2016 | Invincible (Image Comics/Skybound Entertainment) | Robert Kirkman, Ryan Ottley, and Cliff Rathburn | |
| 2016 | Silver Surfer (Marvel Comics) | Dan Slott and Mike Allred | |
| 2017 | Saga (Image Comics) | Brian K. Vaughan and Fiona Staples | |
| 2017 | Astro City (Vertigo Comics/DC Comics) | Kurt Busiek and Brent Anderson | |
| 2017 | Kill or Be Killed (Image Comics) | Ed Brubaker and Sean Phillips | |
| 2017 | The Mighty Thor (Marvel Comics) | Jason Aaron and Russell Dauterman | |
| 2017 | Paper Girls (Image Comics) | Brian K. Vaughan and Cliff Chiang | |
| 2018 | Monstress (Image Comics) | Marjorie Liu and Sana Takeda | |
| 2018 | Black Hammer (Dark Horse Comics) | Jeff Lemire, Dean Ormston, and David Rubín | |
| 2018 | Giant Days (Boom! Studios) | John Allison, Max Sarin, and Liz Fleming | |
| 2018 | Hawkeye (Marvel Comics) | Kelly Thompson, Leonardo Romero, and Mike Walsh | |
| 2018 | The Wicked + The Divine (Image Comics) | Kieron Gillen and Jamie McKelvie | |
| 2019 | Giant Days (Boom! Studios) | John Allison, Max Sarin, and Julia Madrigal | |
| 2019 | Batman (DC Comics) | Tom King et al. | |
| 2019 | Black Hammer: Age of Doom (Dark Horse Comics) | Jeff Lemire, Dean Ormston, and Rich Tommaso | |
| 2019 | Gasolina (Skybound Entertainment/Image Comics) | Sean Mackiewicz and Niko Walter | |
| 2019 | The Immortal Hulk (Marvel Comics) | Al Ewing, Joe Bennett, and Ruy José | |
| 2019 | Runaways (Marvel Comics) | Rainbow Rowell and Kris Anka | |
2020s
| 2020 | Bitter Root (Image Comics) | David F. Walker, Chuck Brown, and Sanford Greene | |
| 2020 | Criminal (Image Comics) | Ed Brubaker and Sean Phillips | |
| 2020 | Crowded (Image Comics) | Christopher Sebela, Ro Stein, and Ted Brandt | |
| 2020 | Daredevil (Marvel Comics) | Chip Zdarsky and Marco Checchetto | |
| 2020 | The Dreaming (DC Comics) | Simon Spurrier, Bilquis Evely et al. | |
| 2020 | The Immortal Hulk (Marvel Comics) | Al Ewing, Joe Bennett, and Ruy José et al. | |
| 2021 | Usagi Yojimbo (IDW Publishing) | Stan Sakai | |
| 2021 | Bitter Root (Image Comics) | David F. Walker, Chuck Brown, and Sanford Greene | |
| 2021 | Daredevil (Marvel Comics) | Chip Zdarsky and Marco Checchetto | |
| 2021 | The Department of Truth (Image Comics) | James Tynion IV and Martin Simmonds | |
| 2021 | Gideon Falls (Image Comics) | Jeff Lemire and Andrea Sorrentino | |
| 2021 | Stillwater (Image Comics/Skybound Entertainment) | Chip Zdarsky and Ramón K. Pérez | |
| 2022 | Bitter Root (Image Comics) (Note: There was a tie between Bitter Root and Something is Killing the Children for Best Continuing Series in 2022.) | David F. Walker, Chuck Brown, and Sanford Greene | |
| 2022 | Something is Killing the Children (Boom! Studios) | James Tynion IV and Werther Dell'Edera | |
| 2022 | The Department of Truth (Image Comics) | James Tynion IV and Martin Simmonds | |
| 2022 | The Immortal Hulk (Marvel Comics) | Al Ewing, Joe Bennett, et al. | |
| 2022 | Nightwing (DC Comics) | Tom Taylor and Bruno Redondo | |
| 2023 | Nightwing (DC Comics) | Tom Taylor and Bruno Redondo | |
| 2023 | Daredevil (Marvel Comics) | Chip Zdarsky, Marco Checchetto, and Rafael de Latorre | |
| 2023 | The Department of Truth (Image Comics) | James Tynion IV and Martin Simmonds | |
| 2023 | Killadelphia (Image Comics) | Rodney Barnes and Jason Shawn Alexander | |
| 2023 | The Nice House on the Lake (DC Comics) | James Tynion IV and Alvaro Martinez Bueno | |
| 2023 | She-Hulk (Marvel Comics) | Rainbow Rowell, Rogê Antônio, Luca Maresca, and Takeshi Miyazawa | |
| 2024 | Transformers (Image Comics/Skybound Entertainment) | Daniel Warren Johnson | |
| 2024 | Birds of Prey (DC Comics) | Kelly Thompson and Leonardo Basto Romero | |
| 2024 | Nightwing (DC Comics) | Tom Taylor and Bruno Redondo | |
| 2024 | Shazam! (DC Comics) | Mark Waid and Dan Mora | |
| 2024 | Wonder Woman (DC Comics) | Tom King and Daniel Sampere | |
| 2025 | Santos Sisters (Floating World) | Greg & Fake, Graham Smith, Dave Landsberger, and Marc Koprinarov | |
| 2025 | Ultimate Spider-Man (Marvel Comics) | Jonathan Hickman and Marco Checchetto | |
| 2025 | Wonder Woman (DC Comics) | Tom King and Daniel Sampere | |
| 2025 | Fantastic Four (Marvel Comics) | Ryan North, Carlos Gomez and Ivan Fiorelli | |
| 2025 | The Department of Truth (Image Comics) | James Tynion IV and Martin Simmonds | |
| 2025 | Detective Comics (DC Comics) | Ram V, Tom Taylor, Riccardo Federici, Stefano Raffaele, Javier Fernandez, Christian Duce, March, and Mikel Janín | |
| 2026 | Absolute Batman (DC Comics) | Scott Snyder, Nick Dragotta | |
| 2026 | Absolute Wonder Woman (DC Comics) | Kelly Thompson, Hayden Sherman, Mattia De lulis | |
| 2026 | The Department of Truth (Image Comics) | James Tynion IV, Martin Simmonds | |
| 2026 | FML (Dark Horse) | Kelly Sue DeConnick, David Lopez | |
| 2026 | The Power Fantasy (Image Comics) | Kieron Gillen, Caspar Wijngaard | |
| 2026 | Storm (Marvel) | Murewa Ayodele, Lucas Werneck | |
