= Scary Go Round =

2002 webcomic by John Allison

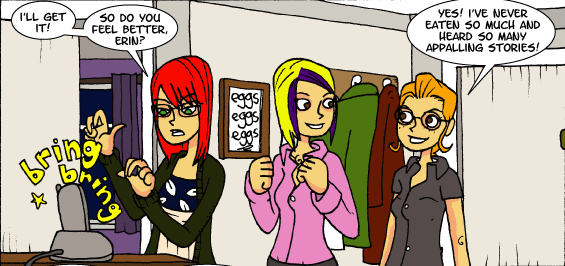
- Panel from 2006 featuring (from left to right) Shelley, Amy and Erin
- Author: John Allison
- Website: scarygoround.com
- Current status/schedule: Ended
- Launch date: 4 June 2002
- End date: 11 September 2009
- Genre(s): Paranormal, comedy
- Preceded by: Bobbins
- Followed by: Bad Machinery

Scary Go Round is a webcomic by John Allison. Running from 2002 to 2009, it is set in the fictional North Yorkshire town of Tackleford and follows university students battling fantasy and science fiction threats to the town. The comic was a successor to Allison's first comic, Bobbins, and was followed by Bad Machinery, all of which take place in the same general setting.

The comic received praise from multiple British newspapers, and it won the Web Cartoonists' Choice Award for best comic in 2005.

== History ==
Scary Go Round began in 2002. It followed on from Allison's first webcomic, Bobbins, and features many of the same characters. According to Allison, Scary Go Round was originally intended to run at the same time as Bobbins, but Allison said that he ended Bobbins for several reasons: to leave Keenspot, to focus on Scary Go Round, and because Scary Go Round was a "clean slate" to write compared to Bobbins which he called "a big mess". By contrast, Scary Go Round was intended from the start to be a work that could be printed in book form.

Scary Go Round first appeared on Modern Tales, but Allison said that joining the service was "a straight out mistake" and by 2003 had moved Scary Go Round off Modern Tales and onto its own website. In an interview in 2004, Allison said that Scary Go Round made up the majority of his income; and in a later interview he said it was "his living".

Scary Go Round was created in vector graphics program Adobe Illustrator, as opposed to earlier comics by Allison which he drew by hand on paper.

Scary Go Round ended in 2009. Allison said that he felt his work was becoming uninspired: "I had a lot of characters that I didn't care about, and I was making whole runs of strips about characters that people didn't really like... Seven and a half years is a long time and I had lost perspective and direction. I was also losing readers for the last year and it was evident that changes had to be made." Scary Go Round was succeeded in the same year by Bad Machinery, another webcomic in the same setting focusing on younger characters. Bad Machinery was initially published on the scarygoround.com site.

Allison has also used the term "Scary Go Round" to refer generally to his works that are connected to the same setting. As of 2021, the scarygoround.com site no longer hosts the Scary Go Round comics; instead the main page links to the various comics produced by Allison as well as to a site where PDFs of Scary Go Round can be purchased.

== Premise ==
The characters in Scary Go Round are a group of students at Tackleford University. The city of Tackleford, a fictional town in North Yorkshire, constantly finds itself under attack by superhero-comic-style threats such as samurai, werewolves, giant robots, dimensional doorways, Bible-thumping witches, shy zombies and polite biker gangs.

The comic initially followed the lives of the barmaids Tessa Davies and Rachel Dukakis-Monteforte, but soon changed focus to another set of characters entirely, including Amy Chilton and Shelley Winters.

=== Characters ===
Adults

- Shelley Winters: Daft and whimsical, Shelley is the unofficial protagonist of Scary Go Round. She is ranked No. 4 in the country for being disaster-prone, even dying on more than one occasion, and has a deep love for jam. Over the course of the strip she has held many jobs, ranging from mayor's assistant to newspaper reporter to a waitress. The final SGR strip shows her leaving for London and a job with the Ministry of History.
- Amy Chilton: Tattooed, pink-haired friend of Shelley and daughter of journalism professor Len Pickering. Amy began the strip as a spoiled art student but has since become the most level-headed and successful of the main adult characters. She continues in Bad Machinery as Amy Beckwith-Chilton, married to Ryan Beckwith.
- Ryan Beckwith: Aimless, good-natured friend of Amy and Shelley, given to buffoonish musings and Americanisms. He continues in Bad Machinery, married to Amy Chilton.
- Tim Jones: This suave genius inventor was for many years the anchor of the cast: older brother figure to Shelley and Ryan, crush object of Amy, mentor to The Boy, and mayor of the town. He was exiled to Wales in 2006 and didn't appear again during the comic's run.
- Riley Beckwith: Ryan's sister and Tim's wife, Riley's low opinion of the main cast led her to concoct a successful scheme to remove herself and Tim from the other characters' orbit. She's a dedicated believer in aliens.
- Tessa and Rachel: These two barmaids were the original protagonists of Scary Go Round, but as the current cast came to dominate the proceedings, they first became villains and then were dispensed with (in Rachel's case, via immolation).
- Gibbous Moon: A recurring character, a marine biologist and short-term love interest for Ryan, first introduced interning on an evil island, repenting after leaving with Shelley. Written out when revealed to be running an underground smuggling ring, and sent to jail.

Teenagers

- Eustace Boyce, aka "The Boy": Nebbishy former assistant to one-time major character Tim Jones, The Boy and his girlfriend Dark Esther (see below) serve as protagonists of the story arcs that focus on the teenage cast. Lost his virginity to Esther de Groot in a caravan in Wales.
- Esther de Groot, aka "Dark Esther": Adolescent goth. Lost her virginity to The Boy in a caravan in Wales, before they became a couple which would last until the end of the series. Esther would go on to be one of the principal characters in Allison's later series Giant Days, centred around her time at university.
- Erin Winters: Shelley's intelligent, sensible, serious sister. Erin was put under a spell by villain Bob Crowley that led her to follow him into a bleak hell dimension from which the creator of Scary Go Round asserted she will never return. Returns in Bad Machinery as a newspaper journalist.

== Print collections ==
- Looks Brains and Everything – The first Scary Go Round collection : strips from 27 August 2002 to 28 February 2003
- Blame The Sky – The second Scary Go Round collection : strips from 4 March 2003 to 27 March 2004
- Skellington – The 3rd Scary Go Round collection : strips from 9 May 2004 to 11 March 2005
- The Retribution Index – The 4th Scary Go Round collection : strips from 14 March 2005 to 17 February 2006
- Great Aches – The 5th Scary Go Round collection : strips from 27 February 2006 to 22 December 2006
- Ahoy Hoy! – The 6th Scary Go Round collection : strips from 1 January 2007 to 2 November 2007
- Peloton – The 7th Scary Go Round collection : strips from 5 November 2007 to 5 September 2008
- Recklessly Yours – The 8th and Final Scary Go Round collection : strips from 8 September 2008 to 11 September 2009

== Reception ==
Writing for The Sunday Times in 2006, Danny O'Brien called Scary Go Round one of the "coolest strips online", describing it as "postmodern British Horror" which was "subtle and stylishly drawn, with a bold cartoon edge". O'Brien said that the comic "reek[s] of cool Britannia" and that the dialogue "ma[de] a pleasant change from the nonstop Americana of most comics".

Also in 2006, James Eagle wrote for the British newspaper Morning Star that Scary Go Round was "brilliant", "bonkers", and "the best British strip that I've yet found".

Writing for Wizard magazine in 2006, Brian Warmoth said that Scary Go Round "stitches a world of frightfully bizarre and at times even Lovecraftian happenings together with a brilliantly quirky cast indicative of his understatedly British sense of humor."

Michael Whitney reviewed Scary Go Round in 2004 for the blog The Webcomics Examiner. Whitney said that compared to vector art used in Bobbins, "The paper dolls loosened up. The figures were squashed and stretched to make them feel more natural." Whitney said that Scary Go Round "decoupled" the Bobbins characters from gag humor, relationship obsession and reality: "They meander into stories full of zombies, witches and inter-dimensional doorways." Whitney added that despite the horror elements of the setting, "the characters take their circumstances too well to let us feel that they're facing a genuine threat in a horror story sense... The tone is too silly for genuinely dire consequences, which may be why Allison fielded some angry response when he killed off a popular character, Shelley, early in the strip." (Shelley would return to life in a later storyline.)

=== Awards ===
Scary Go Round won the Web Cartoonists' Choice Award for Outstanding Comic in 2005. It also won Outstanding Original Digital Art in 2003 and jointly won Outstanding Art in 2004 (tied with Mac Hall), and was nominated for a further 18 awards over the WCCA's history.
