= Bobbins (webcomic) =

Webcomic written by John Allison

- First two panels of Bobbins, featuring Richard and Shelley
- Author: John Allison
- Website: bobbins.keenspot.com
- Current status/schedule: Monday to Friday, archived
- Launch date: 21 September 1998
- End date: 3 June 2002
- Publisher: Keenspot
- Genre: Comedy
- Followed by: Scary Go Round

Bobbins is a webcomic written by John Allison. It ran from 21 September 1998 to 3 June 2002, but shifted into reruns with commentary on 17 May 2002. It has made occasional returns in John Allison's website in between his other comics since 2013. Webcomics portal Keenspot kept the Bobbins archive freely accessible online, but the archives eventually moved to Allison's own site.

Bobbins is set in the fictional West Yorkshire town of Tackleford, England and focused on the lives of the staff of the fictional City Limit magazine. The webcomic was nominated for a few awards, and Bobbins discontinuation in 2002 was followed by the start of Scary Go Round, which shares most of Bobbins' cast.

== History ==
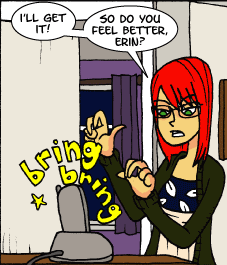
Bobbins characters such as Shelley Winters were also the major characters of Scary Go Round.

John Allison had started drawing the characters in 1994 and experimented with them in various paper-comics until mid-1998 when he submitted a sample pack of 25 strips titled Bobbins — northwestern English slang for "crap" - to King Features Syndicate and Universal Features. They later rejected the submissions. By September 1998 John was hand-drawing five strips per week and scanning them for presenting on the web, up until mid-2000 when he changed to computer drawing with Adobe Illustrator.

In 2001, Allison started producing Bobbins with vector art, resulting in a more stiff, but visually clean look. Bobbins evolved a lot throughout its run, starting out as following longer storylines and becoming more of a day-to-day strip later on.

Allison stopped Bobbins in 2002, so he could focus on his new webcomic, titled Scary Go Round (SGR). Most of the main characters followed him, and SGR, although originally intended to be a spin-off focusing on the minor characters Tessa Davies and Rachel Dukakis-Monteforte, eventually ended up with roughly the same cast as the end of Bobbins, though a number of new characters were introduced later.

In 2013, new installments of Bobbins began to appear on Fridays, interleaved with the Bad Machinery strip (which publishes Monday through Thursday). The new episodes were apparently taking place around 1998, "retconned" into the early Bobbins run, and prominently featured Amy, whose older version was important to the Bad Machinery storyline in progress which involved time travel and alternate realities. More new Bobbins comics have been published since, including a run beginning in December in between storylines of Bad Machinery. Some are "Bobbins NOW" strips, featuring the present-day versions of Bobbins characters.

== Reception ==
Michael Whitney of The Webcomics Examiner said that, though Bobbins's suffered from Allison's lack of experience at the time, the early strips were well drawn regardless. Whitney stated that Allison incorporated his flaws into a consistent and satisfying style. Allison himself has said that Bobbins was "pretty rough and variable in quality," but that he "learned [his] craft" drawing it. As for the story, Stephen Gerding described Bobbins as similar to Friends, or Coupling with an office atmosphere. Allison noted his later episodes got very bizarre and this, beginning in 2002, led to the supernatural tone of Scary Go Round. Whitney stated that, as the plot turned to the bizarre, "the center was losing hold."

In 2002, Bobbins was nominated for the Web Cartoonists' Choice Awards categories Best Use of Color, Best Site Design and Best Female Character (Shelley Winters). In June the same year, Bobbins was Runner-up best online comic strip in the UK National Comic Awards.
