= John Allison (comics) =

British artist and webcomic writer

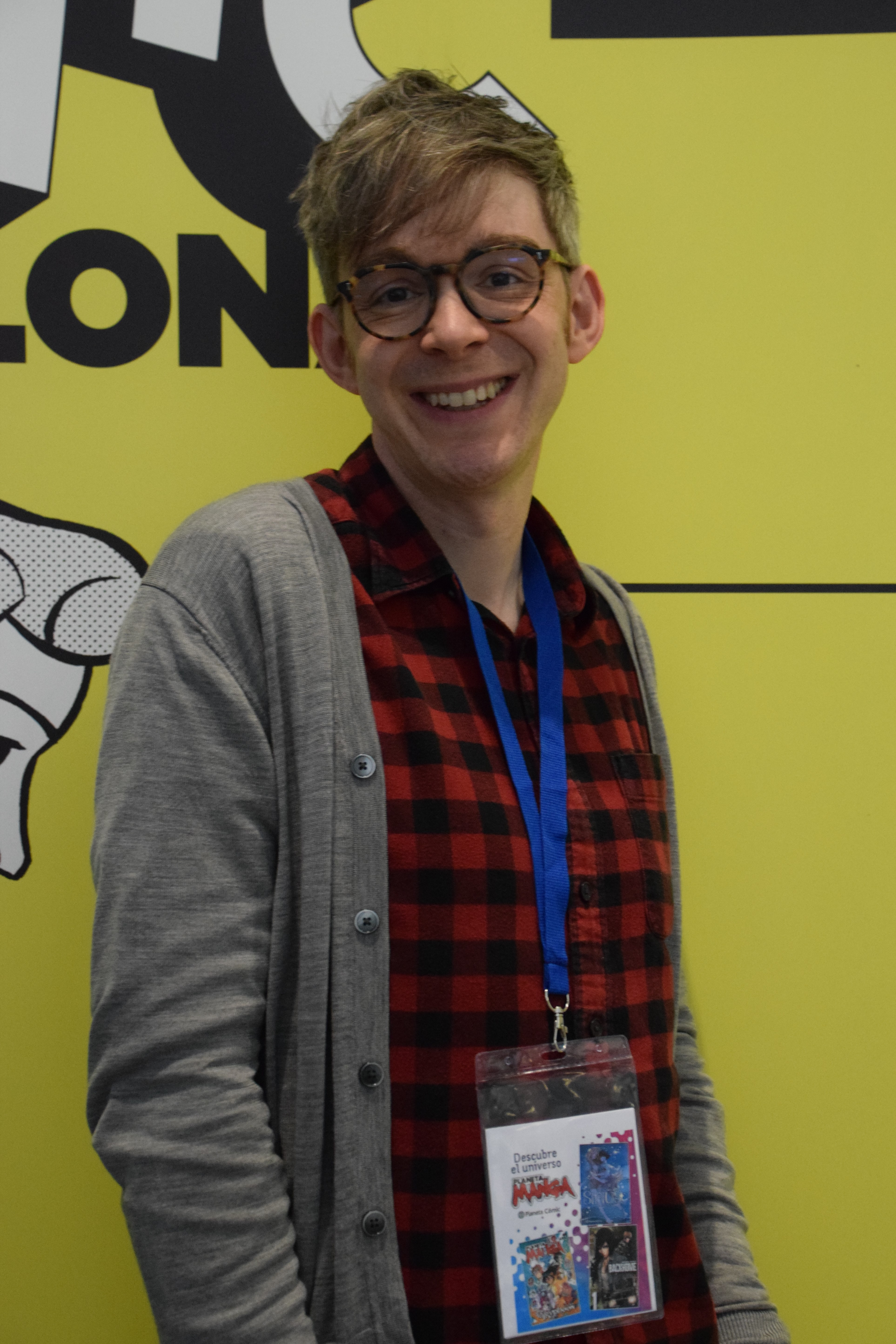
- John Allison at the Barcelona Comic Fair (2022)
- Born: John Allison; 1976 (age 49–50)
- Known for: Webcomics
- Notable work: Bobbins, Scary Go Round, Bad Machinery, Giant Days

John Allison (born 1976) is a comic writer and artist. He has been producing comics since 1998 and his work has won multiple Eisner Awards.

== Biography ==
Allison started creating webcomics in 1998 with Bobbins, a series which ran on Keenspot. He ended Bobbins in 2002, later saying that he had fallen out of love with the rough and ready nature of 'Bobbins', and at the same time started a new comic, Scary Go Round. Then, in 2009, he ended Scary Go Round and started Bad Machinery. In an interview, Allison said that he ended Scary Go Round because "the work I was doing was becoming somewhat uninspired. I had a lot of characters that I didn't care about, and I was making whole runs of strips about characters that people didn't really like... I had lost perspective and direction. I was also losing readers for the last year and it was evident that changes had to be made."

Allison described Scary Go Round as "a comic that I've been making since 2002. It started off as a comic about barmaids Tessa and Rachel, then it became more about Shelley Winters and her bizarre escapades. In recent times it is kind of a split between the Shelley Show and Tackleford Grammar School. It's always evolving." Bad Machinery focuses on several of those grammar school children, now teenage detectives.

In 2013, Allison pitched a spin-off from Scary Go Round, Giant Days, to Boom! Box, a newly formed imprint of Boom! Studios for established artists outside the comics industry. The series follows three young women—Esther de Groot, Susan Ptolemy and Daisy Wooton—who share a hall of residence at the University of Sheffield. The series began as a six-issue limited run, and was then picked up as an ongoing series. In 2016, Giant Days was nominated for two Eisner Awards and three Harvey Awards, with a fourth Harvey nomination for Lissa Treiman's work on the comic. In 2019, it won two Eisner Awards, for Best Continuing Series and Best Humor Publication. It concluded later that year with a special over-sized issue.

The success of Giant Days led to further work with independent presses. Allison went on to write the series By Night for Boom! Studios, and both wrote and illustrated Steeple for Dark Horse Comics.

In 2024, Allison published a Conan the Barbarian webcomic on his website. Despite the character being public domain in the UK, he received a cease-and-desist from Conan Properties International, the holders of the Conan IP rights in the United States. This caused Allison to cease publication of the webcomic, saying that he did not "have the time or the energy to contest this."

Allison currently resides in Leeds.

== Works ==
- Bobbins (1998–2002, 2013–2017)
- Scary Go Round (2002–2009)
- Bad Machinery (2009–2017)
- Destroy History (2009-2020)
- Giant Days (2011, 2015–2019)
- By Night (2018–19)
- Steeple (2019–2024)
- Wicked Things (2020)
- The Great British Bump-Off (2023-2025)
- Solver (2021-present)
- Destroy History: NEMS (2020-present)
- Savage Sword of Susan (2025)

== Awards ==
Year	Nominated work	Category	Result	Notes
2002	Bobbins	UK National Comics Awards: Best Online Strip	Nominated	
2002	Bobbins	Web Cartoonists' Choice Awards in three categories: * Best Use of Color * Best Site Design * Best Female Character	Nominated	
2003	Scary Go Round	Web Cartoonists' Choice Awards: Outstanding Original Digital Art	Won	
2003	Scary Go Round	Web Cartoonists' Choice Awards in three other categories: * Outstanding Art * Outstanding Environment Design * Outstanding Use of Color	Nominated	
2004	Scary Go Round	Web Cartoonists' Choice Awards: Outstanding Art	Won	Joint winner with Mac Hall
2004	Scary Go Round	Web Cartoonists' Choice Awards in six other categories: * Outstanding Comic * Outstanding Writing * Outstanding Environment Design * Outstanding Character (Writing) * Outstanding Comedic Comic * Outstanding Story Concept	Nominated	
2005	Scary Go Round	Web Cartoonists' Choice Awards: Outstanding Comic	Won	
2005	Scary Go Round	Web Cartoonists' Choice Awards in three other categories: * Outstanding Art * Outstanding Environment Design * Outstanding Layout	Nominated	
2006	Scary Go Round	Web Cartoonists' Choice Awards: Outstanding Comic	Nominated	
2007	Scary Go Round	Web Cartoonists' Choice Awards in three categories: * Outstanding Comic * Outstanding Character Writing * Outstanding Writer	Nominated	
2008	Scary Go Round	Web Cartoonists' Choice Awards: Outstanding Character Rendering	Nominated	
2016	Giant Days	Eisner Award: Best Continuing Series	Nominated	Allison wrote for Giant Days. The nomination was for John Allison, Max Sarin, and Julia Madrigal.
2016	Giant Days	Eisner Award: Best Writer	Nominated	
2017	Bad Machinery, Vol. 5: The Case of the Fire Inside	Eisner Award: Best Publication for teens (ages 13–17)	Nominated	
2018	Giant Days	Eisner Award: Best Continuing Series	Nominated	Allison wrote for Giant Days. The nomination was for John Allison, Max Sarin, and Julia Madrigal.
2018	Giant Days	Eisner Award: Best Humor Publication	Nominated	Allison wrote for Giant Days. The nomination was for John Allison, Max Sarin, and Julia Madrigal.
2019	Giant Days	Eisner Award: Best Continuing Series	Won	Allison wrote for Giant Days. The nomination was for John Allison, Max Sarin, and Julia Madrigal.
2019	Giant Days	Eisner Award: Best Humor Publication	Won	Allison wrote for Giant Days. The nomination was for John Allison, Max Sarin, and Julia Madrigal.
