= Reed Waller =

American comic book artist (1949–2026)

- Reed Waller in 2007
- Born: August 3, 1949 New Richland, Minnesota, U.S.
- Died: November 17, 2026 (aged 77)
- Areas: Cartoonist, Penciller
- Notable works: Omaha the Cat Dancer
- Collaborators: Kate Worley

Reed Waller (August 3, 1949 – November 17, 2026) was an American comic book artist and musician. He is best known for creating and illustrating the sexually explicit comic book series Omaha the Cat Dancer, with writer Kate Worley, which was nominated for several Eisner Awards. He was also influential in developing furry fandom.

== Life and career ==
Reed Waller was born in New Richland, Minnesota.

Waller and Ken Fletcher began Vootie, an amateur press association for fans of funny animal comics, in 1976.

In 1978, Waller began writing and drawing Omaha the Cat Dancer, as a series of strips in Vootie. The strips featured anthropomorphic animals such as the title character, and reflected contemporary controversy about strip clubs, and – responding to requests for more sex in furry comics – included sexually explicit scenes. The series was spotlighted as the sole feature in an issue of Kitchen Sink's anthology series Bizarre Sex in 1981.

Waller made a living playing rock and folk guitar for four years. He met Kate Worley and they began playing music together, then moved in together after their respective marriages ended. After launching Omaha as a separate ongoing comic book series in 1984, Waller suffered writer's block. Worley offered suggestions, and he invited her to fully take over as the series' writer, in part to ensure that a story focused on women and feminism had a female perspective.

Waller and Worley faced recurring censorship challenges publishing the series. In 1986, a comics store manager was charged with distributing "obscene" material including Omaha, leading to the founding of the Comic Book Legal Defense Fund. In 1988, Diamond Comics Distributors temporarily refused to distribute the series to stores, and in 1989 a comics bindery refused to put together a collection. Copies were seized in New Zealand, and reviewed in 1990 by its Indecent Publications Tribunal, which ruled that since the series depicted sexuality in the context of ongoing emotional relationships between the characters in a mature and realistic way, it was not indecent.

The series was critically acclaimed, and was nominated for Eisners for Best Continuing Series, Best Black-and-White Series, and Best Writer/Artist in 1989; and Best Black and White Series and (for Worley) Best Writer in 1991.

In 1988, Waller came out as bisexual in the letters column of Omaha. Worley and Waller were both injured in a car accident, and suspended production of the series; this was greatly extended when they had an acrimonious parting, which made their attempts at working together difficult. In 1991, Waller was diagnosed with colon cancer, with other creators publishing two Images of Omaha comics to raise money to pay his medical bills. For about ten years, Waller stopped drawing.

In 2002, he and Worley reached a deal with Fantagraphics to reprint Omaha, with them producing an additional 100 pages to finish the series. However, she was then diagnosed with cancer, and died in June 2004. Waller collaborated with comics writer James Vance – whom Worley had married following their breakup – to complete the Omaha series, based on notes left by Worley. The title was picked up by NBM Publishing, and resumed publication in November 2005. Waller retired from drawing when he finished the final chapter of the series in October 2012, and it was published the following year.

He received a Lifetime Achievement Good Furry Award in 2023.

Reed Waller died on November 17, 2026, at the age of 77.
