= Astro City =

Comic book series

- Cover art to Astro City (Vol. 2) #1 by Alex Ross.

Publication information
- Publisher: Image Comics (1995–1996, 2022–present); Homage Comics (1996–2004); WildStorm (2004–2010); Vertigo Comics (2013–2018)
- Format: Ongoing series
- Genre: Superhero
- Publication date: (Vol. 1); August 1995 – January 1996; (Vol. 2); September 1996 – August 2000; Local Heroes; April 2003 – February 2004; The Dark Age and the specials; June 2004 – August 2010; (Vol. 3); August 2013 – August 2018; (Vol. 4); March 2022 – present

Creative team
- Created by: Kurt Busiek; Brent Anderson; Alex Ross
- Written by: Kurt Busiek
- Artists: Brent Anderson; Alex Ross; Will Blyberg
- Editors: Kurt Busiek; Ann Huntington-Busiek; John Layman

Collected editions
- Metrobook One: ISBN 1-5343-2204-3
- Metrobook Two: ISBN 1-5343-2317-1
- Metrobook Three: ISBN 1-5343-2462-3
- Metrobook Four: ISBN 1-5343-9971-2
- Metrobook Five: ISBN 1-5343-9709-4
- Metrobook Six: ISBN 1-5343-5038-1

Astro City, also known as Kurt Busiek's Astro City, is an American superhero anthology comic book series centered on a fictional American city of that name. Created and written by Kurt Busiek, the series is mostly illustrated by Brent Anderson, with character designs and painted covers by Alex Ross. Its stories focus primarily on everyday life in a superhero comic universe, rather than on superheroic adventures and battles.

The first volume was published from 1995 to 1996 by Image Comics. In 1996, a second volume was launched under the Homage Comics imprint of Image partner studio WildStorm, which was then acquired by DC Comics, where the series later transitioned to the WildStorm Signature Series imprint and continued until 2010. During this period it switched from a regular ongoing series to a sequence of periodic mini-series and special issues. A third ongoing volume was launched under DC's Vertigo imprint in 2013 and concluded in 2018. Counting all series, mini-series and special issues, over 100 issues have been published.

== Themes ==
The series portrays different perspectives on what everyday life might be like in a superhero-comic universe, with stories focusing on a variety of different superhero characters and ordinary people. It has been described as representing Busiek's effort to move away from the Dark Age of Comic Books toward more optimistic stories, functioning as a "thesis statement" of how superhero comics work. The series examines the archetypes of older superhero comics, functioning as "a vehicle to comment on [topics] buried in the subtext of old comics".

Many of the superheroes in Astro City bear similarities to famous characters from Marvel Comics or DC Comics. For instance, the feminist superhero Winged Victory is reminiscent of Wonder Woman, and the superhero team First Family resemble the Fantastic Four.

== Characters ==
Some of the more prominent personalities of Astro City are listed below:

=== Heroes ===
- Samaritan (Asa Martin - an anagram of "samaritan") is an extremely powerful hero. A time-traveler, he appeared in this era in 1985, active as a hero since 1986 and is a current member of Honor Guard. He is sometimes referred to as "Big Red". Samaritan is the first hero in the series to receive an origin story.
- The Confessor (Jeremiah Parrish) is a mysterious vigilante detective, apparently active from the 1950s to the mid-1990s. His history is a blur of myths and assumptions, as dark as his crime fighting methods. In the Confession arc from the second volume of the series, even his new sidekick struggles to know more about his mentor.
- Crackerjack is an egocentric, reckless crime-fighter, with amazing agility and a staff weapon, active since 1991.
- The Hanged Man is a ghostly figure who protects Shadow Hill, appearing as a floating apparition with a burlap sack over his head and a noose around his neck. He is active in Astro City since the 19th century and is rumored to have existed since at least the Middle Ages.
- M.P.H. a.k.a. The Acceleration Ace (Michael Hendrie) is a super-speedster and member of Honor Guard. Besides his membership duties with Honor Guard, he operates in his home city of Detroit.
- Jack-in-the-Box (Zachary Johnson) is a clown-themed vigilante with no known powers but agility and an arsenal of clown and toy-inspired weaponry.
- Silver Agent (Alan Jay Craig) is an armored vigilante who suffers a tragic fate, hinted at for years. He is active from 1956 through the early 1970s, and via time travel, sporadically throughout thousands of years into the future. He is a founding member of Honor Guard.
- Winged Victory (Lauren Freed) is a feminist Greco-Roman themed superhero, controversial due to her habit of saving women before men regardless of the situation.
- Beautie is a sophisticated android modeled on a popular doll.

=== Villains ===
- Bridwell is an Enelsian spy who gathers intelligence on Earth's heroes; he is enamored of humanity's better instincts, but ultimately disgusted by its baser ones.
- The Conquistador (Esteban Rodrigo Suarez Hidalgo) is a mysterious armored villain who hired villains from Kiefer Square as part of an elaborate and mysterious scheme. Formerly he has been the hero El Hombre.
- The Deacon (Deke MacManus) is a soft-spoken lord of "ordinary" organized crime in Astro City, who cultivates the persona of a devout but merciless clergyman.
- Infidel is a slave who became an immortal mystic during the Middle Ages and traveled through time to become a tyrant in the 36th century. Infidel became the archenemy of Samaritan after Samaritan's origin changed history, erasing Infidel's future empire, and Samaritan thwarted Infidel's attempts restore it. He is essentially a mad scientist who uses alchemy and magic to warp reality.
- The Junkman (Hiram Potterstone) is an aged villain seeking vengeance on society for age discrimination. He recycles and enhances his weaponry from discarded trash.
- The Mock Turtle (Martin Chefwick) is a generally docile and polite man who grew up obsessed with fantasies, especially Alice in Wonderland. He eventually became a costumed criminal, employing a weaponized armor themed after the Alice character from which he drew his name.

=== Groups ===
- The Astro City Irregulars is a group of outcast heroes founded in the early to mid-1970s, but disbanded by the 2010s, at which time the second Goldenglove was hoping to get it going again.
- The Crossbreed is a group of religious themed heroes, consisting of Noah, Daniel, Peter, Mary, David, and Joshua. The group is stigmatized by society and derogatorily referred to "Jesus freaks".
- E.A.G.L.E. (Extranormal Activities Garrison for Law Enforcement) is a government agency charged with dealing with super-powered and other extraordinary threats to public safety.
- The Enelsians is a matriarchal alien race that invaded Earth, with Astro City as their focal point.
- The First Family is a family of interdimensional explorers and superheroes consisting of brothers Augustus and Julius Furst, Augustus' adopted children Nick and Natalie, Natalie's dinosaur-like husband Rex, and their daughter Astra.
- Honor Guard is the most prestigious superhero group. Founded in 1959, members came and went over the years. For much of its history it maintained seven active members; more recently, the group has expanded considerably. The roster as of 2017 consists of Samaritan (leader), Assemblyman, Beautie, Cleopatra, the Gentleman, Hummingbird, the Living Nightmare, M.P.H., N-Forcer (latest successor of the original), Winged Victory and Wolfspider, with American Chibi on detached duty.
- Pyramid is a criminal organization with an ancient Egyptian motif, led by the Sekhmet Stone, a living mystical artifact from the past.

=== Civilians ===
- Looney Leo is a cartoon lion brought to life in 1946. He was briefly the Gentleman's sidekick, then a media star. When his fame faded, he was homeless for a while before becoming a pawn in a super-villain's plot. Afterwards, he was a recluse before becoming host of a nostalgic nightclub bearing his name in the entertainment district.
- Steeljack (Carl "Carlie" Donewicz) is a former super-villain and member of the villain group the Terrifying Three. He is a resident of Kiefer Square who attempts to reform after serving his time. He became active as a villain from about 1970 to 1978, then in prison from 1978 to 1998. He is later tapped by former associates to investigate the string of "Black Mask" murders and later still became a licensed private investigator.
- Charles Raymond Williams and Royal James Williams are brothers whose parents were killed in 1959 during a superhero battle. They grew up following very different paths with Charles becoming a police officer and Royal a petty criminal. They are the focus of The Dark Age four-book maxiseries.

== Collected editions ==
The series has been collected into a number of trade paperbacks:

- Astro City Volume 1: Life in the Big City (ISBN 1-56389-551-X, collects Astro City vol. 1 #1–6)
- Astro City Volume 2: Confession (ISBN 1-56389-550-1, collects Astro City vol. 2 #1/2, 4–9)
- Astro City Volume 3: Family Album (ISBN 1-56389-552-8, collects Astro City vol. 2 #1–3, 10–13)
- Astro City Volume 4: Tarnished Angel (ISBN 1-56389-663-X, collects Astro City vol. 2 #14–20)
- Astro City Volume 5: Local Heroes (ISBN 1401202845, collects Astro City vol. 2 #21–22, Astro City: Local Heroes #1–5, Astro City Special: Supersonic, "Since the Fire")
- Astro City Volume 6: The Dark Age Book One: Brothers and Other Strangers (ISBN 9781401220778, collects Astro City: The Dark Age vol. 1 #1–4, vol. 2 #1–4)
- Astro City Volume 7: The Dark Age Book Two: Brothers in Arms (ISBN 1401228437, collects Astro City: The Dark Age vol. 3 #1–4, vol. 4 #1–4)
- Astro City Volume 8: Shining Stars (ISBN 978-1401229849, collects Astro City: Samaritan Special, Astro City: Astra #1–2, Astro City: Silver Agent #1–2 and Astro City: Beautie #1)
- Astro City Volume 9: Through Open Doors (ISBN 978-1401247522, collects Astro City vol. 3 #1–6)
- Astro City Volume 10: Victory (ISBN 978-1401250577, collects Astro City vol. 3 #7–10, Astro City Visitor's Guide #1)
- Astro City Volume 11: Private Lives (ISBN 978-1401254599, collects Astro City vol. 3 #11–16)
- Astro City Volume 12: Lovers Quarrel (ISBN 978-1401258252, collects Astro City vol. 3 #18–21, 23–24)
- Astro City Volume 13: Honor Guard (ISBN 978-1401263874, collects Astro City vol. 3 #17, 22, 25, 27–28, 31)
- Astro City Volume 14: Reflections (ISBN 978-1401274924, collects Astro City vol. 3 #26, 29–30, 32–34)
- Astro City Volume 15: Ordinary Heroes (ISBN 978-1401274931, collects Astro City vol. 3 #35–36, 39–40, 42, 44)
- Astro City Volume 16: Broken Melody (ISBN 978-1401281496, collects Astro City vol. 3 #37–38, 41, 43, 45–46)
- Astro City Volume 17: Aftermaths (ISBN 978-1401289447, collects Astro City vol. 3 #47–52)

Beginning in 2022, Image Comics began collecting Astro City in a series of thick trade collections, dubbed "Metrobooks":

- Astro City Metrobook, Vol. 1 (ISBN 978-1534322042, collects Astro City vol. 1 #1–6 and vol. 2 #1/2, 1–12)
- Astro City Metrobook, Vol. 2 (ISBN 978-1534323179, collects Astro City vol. 2 #13–22, Astro City: Local Heroes #1–5; Astro City Special #1; Astro City: A Visitor's Guide; and portions of 9-11: The World's Finest Comic Book Writers & Artists Tell Stories to Remember #2)
- Astro City Metrobook, Vol. 3 (ISBN 978-1534323179, collects Astro City: The Dark Age vol. 1 #1–4; Astro City: The Dark Age vol. 2 #1–4; Astro City: The Dark Age vol. 3 #1–4; Astro City: The Dark Age vol. 4 #1–4; Astro City: Silver Agent #1–2; and portions of Astro City/Arrowsmith: The Flip Book)
- Astro City Metrobook, Vol. 4 (ISBN 978-1534399716, collects Astro City: Samaritan #1, Astro City: Beautie #1, Astro City: Astra #1–2 and Astro City vol. 3 #1–10, 17 & 22–24)
- Astro City Metrobook, Vol. 5 (ISBN 978-1534397095, collects Astro City vol. 3 #11–16, 18-21 & 25–34)
- Astro City Metrobook, Vol. 6 (ISBN 978-1534350380, collects Astro City vol. 3 #35-52)

In 2023 Image Comics also announced a series of oversized hardcover collections of Astro City, dubbed "Opus Editions", the first of which is yet to be released.

- Astro City: The Opus Edition, Book One (ISBN 978-1534399341, collects Kurt Busiek's Astro City vol. 1 #1–6 and vol. 2 #1/2, 1–22; Kurt Busiek's Astro City 3D Special #1; Astro City: Local Heroes #1–5; Astro City Special #1; Astro City: A Visitor's Guide; and portions of 9-11: The World's Finest Comic Book Writers & Artists Tell Stories to Remember #2)

== Awards ==
Astro City and its creators have won a number of Eisner Awards and Harvey Awards, the American comic industry's equivalent of science fiction's Hugo Awards, as well as several Comics Buyer's Guide Fan Awards.

Astro City won both the Eisner and Harvey Awards for Best New Series for 1996, the Eisner for Best Continuing Series for 1997 and 1998, the Harvey for Best Continuing or Limited Series for 1998, and was a top votegetter for the Comics Buyer's Guide Fan Award for Favorite Limited Series for 1997. The earliest collection Astro City: Life in the Big City, won the Harvey Award for Best Graphic Album of Previously Published Work for 1997 and the Comics Buyer's Guide Fan Award for Favorite Reprint Graphic Novel/Album for 1997. Astro City: Confession was a top votegetter for the Comics Buyer's Guide Fan Award for Favorite Reprint Graphic Album of 1998 and 1999. Astro City: Family Album was a top votegetter for the Comics Buyer's Guide Fan Award for Favorite Reprint Graphic Album of 1999.

Particular stories or storylines have also come in for honors. Astro City #1 won the 1996 Harvey for Best Single Issue or Story, while #4, "Safeguards", took the Eisner for Best Single Issue/Single Story for the same year. The 1997 and 1998 Eisners went to vol. 2, #1, "Welcome to Astro City", and vol. 2, #10, "Show 'Em All", respectively, and the 1998 Eisner for Best Serialized Story went to vol. 2, #4–9's "Confession" storyline.

"Welcome to the Big City" in Volume 2 #1 was a top vote-getter for the Comics Buyer's Guide Fan Award for Favorite Comic-Book Story for 1997. The story "The Nearness of You" from the #1/2 issue received votes for the same award that year, as did the "Everyday Life" story which ran in Volume 2 issues #2 and 3. The story "Confession" from Volume 2 issues #5–9 won the Comics Buyer's Guide Fan Award for Favorite Story for 1998. "Show 'Em All" from issue #10 was a top votegetter for the Comics Buyer's Guide Fan Award for Favorite Story for 1998.

Kurt Busiek was honored with 1998's Harvey and 1999's Eisner for Best Writer, in both instances for bodies of work including Astro City. Alex Ross took both awards for Best Cover Artist in 1996, 1997, and 1998, in all instances but one for Astro City or bodies of work including it (the exception was the 1997 Harvey, awarded for Kingdom Come #1). He also took 1999's Harvey and 2000's Eisner for Best Cover Artist, again for bodies of work including Astro City.

== Other media ==
=== Film ===
In 2003, Ben Barenholtz, Jonathan Alpers and Busiek hoped to develop an Astro City film, with Barenholtz as producer and Alpers as lead scripter, but the plans did not take off, whereupon Barenholtz subsequently took the project to Working Title Films. In July 2010, Working Title acquired the rights to make a live-action feature film adaptation of Astro City. Busiek was to write a script treatment, and also to executive-produce, along with Barenholtz and Alpers. In May 2013, Kurt Busiek said that Working Title's option had lapsed but he was in negotiation with another party.

=== Television ===
In March 2018, FremantleMedia North America was interested to produce a live-action Astro City TV series with a pilot episode written by Busiek and Rick Alexander. Later, in the afterword of the That Was Then... one-shot, Busiek noted that it was still in development with a different company.
