= Shockwave Radio Theater =

Shockwave Radio Theater was broadcast for 28 years on Fresh Air Radio, the community radio station KFAI, 90.3FM Minneapolis, 106.7FM St. Paul from 1979 to 2007. Much of Shockwave Radio is archived on archive.org. Podcasts of some shows are available.

The name of the program was Shockwave. To distinguish the broadcasts from the Macromedia software (which came much later), it is often referred to as Shockwave Radio. To expand further and to emphasize original productions, the full name of the program was used: Shockwave Radio Theater.

Shockwave Radio Theater specialized in science fiction humor, but diverged into science fact, strange music of any genre and just general weirdness. Baron Dave declared that "Politics is a subset of science fiction humor." The program occasionally interviewed politicians including then-Governor Jesse Ventura and the station's Congressman Keith Ellison. Political commentary on a progressive slant was common. Quite often the show would share time with Jerry Stearns' Sound Affects: A Radio Playground to present hour-long science fiction radio theater programs.

== Origins ==
In the summer of 1979, three broadcasters on a new station wanted a program to showcase science fiction music. They named it after John Brunner's novel Shockwave Rider. Everett Forte, Chris Dronen and Charles E. Hamilton III volunteered on Fresh Air Radio. Within a few weeks, Charles had left for greener pastures. Everett and Chris went to a local science fiction convention and asked if anyone wanted to help. The next show, September 19, 1979, five science fiction fans showed up at the station and were interviewed by Chris. This is the date used for anniversary.

Dave Romm (later known as Baron Dave) was one of the people on the first show, and was later the main producer and host of the program. Many people contributed their talents as writers/performers over the years, and many more have been interviewed or have been part of a Shockwave program in some way. Everyone associated with the program, either as a broadcaster or a listener, is known as a Shockwave Rider.

The show went off the air in 2007 due to a reshuffling of KFAI's schedule. Romm recorded some podcasts during the summer of 2008 on his site.

== An incomplete history of Shockwave live stage shows ==
Shockwave performed a live radio program at Minicon from 1981–1999. The first Live Stage Show was at Not-Anokon I in 1980, the most recent was at MarsCon in 2004. Opening Ceremonies/Middle Ceremonies/Closing Ceremonoies at LACon III in 1996 was written by Baron Dave but was not technically a Shockwave Radio Theater Production.

== Notable Shockwave riders ==
Included here are notable people who wrote for or performed in productions.

1. Kara Dalkey
2. Emma Bull
3. Kate Worley
4. Steven Brust
5. John M. Ford
6. Jane Yolen
7. Allen Varney
8. David Ossman
9. Phil Proctor
10. Barry B. Longyear
