= "Omaha" the Cat Dancer =

Erotic comic strip/book by Reed Waller and Kate Worley

- Omaha the Cat Dancer No. 1, featuring the principal characters, Charles Tabey Jr. aka Chuck Katt and Omaha.
- Author(s): Reed Waller and Kate Worley
- Launch date: 1978
- Alternate name: The Adventures of Omaha
- Publisher(s): Kitchen Sink, SteelDragon, Fantagraphics, NBM
- Genre(s): Erotic, funny animal, soap opera

"Omaha" the Cat Dancer is an erotic comic strip and later comic book created by artist Reed Waller and writer Kate Worley. Set in fictional Mipple City, Minnesota (derived from "MPLS", the old postal abbreviation for Minneapolis) in a universe populated by anthropomorphic animal characters, the strip is a soap opera focusing on Omaha, a feline exotic dancer, and her lover, Chuck, the son of a business tycoon.

The strip debuted in the funny animal magazine Vootie, and it was subsequently published in a number of underground comix in the late 1970s and early 1980s. "Omaha" the Cat Dancer became the subject of the eponymous comic book series published from 1984 to 1993 by Kitchen Sink Press; it was relaunched by Fantagraphics Books through 1995. The final chapters of the strip's storyline were published in Sizzle magazine, beginning in 2006.

"Omaha" the Cat Dancer was the first of several comic books published in the early 1980s which integrated explicit sex into their storylines, rather than using sex for shock value. The comic was the subject of a number of obscenity controversies, and it was nominated for multiple Eisner Awards in 1989 and 1991.

== Publication history ==
In 1976, Reed Waller founded Vootie, a fanzine intended to promote funny animal comics. He began developing the concept for "Omaha" the Cat Dancer after one of the magazine's contributors said that there was not enough sex in the genre. Inspired by Robert Crumb's Fritz the Cat, Waller began looking for a theme for his new comic. He visited local strip clubs in St. Paul with his sketchbook, and read newspaper articles about attempts to shut the bars down. Another contributor to the magazine, Jim Schumeister, proposed a comic called Charlie's Bimbos, in which "a bevy of strippers champion liberty in the face of Puritan oppression". This proposal sparked the idea for Omaha.

The character debuted in The Adventures of Omaha, which was published in Vootie in 1978. The first chapter of "Omaha" the Cat Dancer was published by Kitchen Sink Press in Bizarre Sex No. 9 in 1981. A five-page untitled story appeared in Bizarre Sex No. 10 in 1982, as a followup to the first chapter. In 1983, a one-page parody strip starring Omaha, titled "Hotsizz Twonkies" (a parody ad of HostessTwinkies), was published in E-Man No. 5 by First Comics. Another five-page untitled story, identified as "Shelly and Omaha" in The Collected Omaha Volume 1, appeared in Dope Comix #5; it was reprinted in Bizarre Sex Series No. 5. In 1991, the Omaha story "A Strip in Time" appeared in Munden's Bar Annual No. 2, published by First Comics.

In 1984, SteelDragon Press published the first issue of "Omaha" the Cat Dancer, which featured the second chapter of the story. Waller then was unable to continue with the story. The third chapter was completed with help from Kate Worley, who continued to write the series thereafter.

The Omaha series began more regular publication in 1986 through by Kitchen Sink Press, which published 20 issues through June 1994. However, in August 1988, Worley was injured in a car accident; the series' frequency slowed as a result of her recovery process. In November 1991, Waller was diagnosed with colon cancer; two issues of Images of "Omaha" were published in 1992 to pay for Waller's medical expenses, featuring art and writing by several major comic creators. In 1995, Waller and Worley ceased production of the series. In 2002, Waller and Worley agreed to complete the story; Worley was diagnosed with lung cancer, and began chemotherapy and radiation treatments in that year. On June 6, 2004, Worley died before completing the story; her husband, James Vance, began to edit and complete the final chapters.

The series lasted 20 issues before being cancelled in 1993. Fantagraphics Books later relaunched the series, but it only lasted four issues, the last published in 1995. In 1994, Rob, a supporting character from the series, appeared in Gay Comix No. 22. The final chapters of the story were serialized in Sizzle, beginning in 2006.

From 1987 until 1998, Kitchen Sink, and later Fantagraphics, published six volumes of the Omaha strips under the title The Collected "Omaha" the Cat Dancer. From 2005 to 2013, NBM Publishing imprint Amerotica published eight volumes of strips under the title The Complete Omaha the Cat Dancer.

== Fictional background and characters ==
"Omaha" the Cat Dancer takes place in the fictional Mipple City, Minnesota. The comic's universe is populated by anthropomorphic animal characters. The story began as a satire of local blue laws, before evolving into a comic book soap opera.

=== Characters ===
- Susan "Susie" Jensen (though very few of the other characters know her real name) a.k.a. Omaha, an anthropomorphic feline stripper. After a while, she gets a pet ferret named Squeak. She was previously married years before meeting Charles Jr., but a divorce was later amicably arranged with her separated husband.
- Charles Tabey Jr. a.k.a. Chuck Katt, lover to Omaha; he turns out to be the heir to Charles Tabey Sr.
- Charles Tabey Sr., a powerful yet mentally ill business tycoon.
- Shelly Hine, a bisexual exotic dancer and Omaha's best friend. She was caught in the line of fire and gunned down by a man named Andre DeRoc and is now in a wheelchair. Shelly was Charles Tabey Sr.'s lover and confidante. In the very early comics that appeared in Vootie magazine, she and Omaha were lovers.
- Joanne Follett, a prostitute.
- Kurt Huddle, Shelly's nurse and later lover. Initially, the personal assistant and valet to Tabey Sr.
- Rob Shaw, a gay photographer.
- Maria Elandos Tabey, Chuck Tabey's mother, whom he has not seen for years. She was blackmailed into leaving by Calvin Bonner over her gay brother. She also bears a very striking resemblance to Omaha.
- Senator Calvin Bonner, a state senator and business tycoon. A vocal public morality crusader and a complete hypocrite since he is one of Joanne's regular, and more abusive, customers. He gets murdered by an unknown assassin during a session set up by Joanne to compromise him by having Rob Shaw take incriminating photos of him.
- George, owner of the Kitty Korner Klub, Omaha and Shelly worked at.
- Ceecee and Angie, two strippers who work at Mr. Pip's Nite Club.

== Plot summary ==
Susan (Susie) Jensen is an aspiring model from the Midwest and new in the town of Mipple City, Minnesota. The story starts out as Susie uses her modeling to begin working at the strip club "Kitty Korner Klub" with her newfound friend Shelly Hine, where she now goes by the stage name of "Omaha". Omaha starts to become well known after she is featured for the first time in Pet Magazine, an adult entertainment magazine, as the centerfold "Kitten of the Month".

After working as a locally popular dancer, she and Shelly meet Chuck Katt, an artist who begins to fall in love with Omaha and whom she considers "normal". After a new blue law is passed, "all strip clubs are to be closed down", Omaha and Shelly are put out of work. Shelly soon finds a hidden sub-basement at a restaurant that is owned by a man named Charles Tabey, a powerful, yet mentally ill business tycoon, with Shelly as his lover in secret. With Omaha out of work, Chuck Katt starts working for his former boss, Andre DeRoc, a media mogul in the town and the arch-rival of Charles Tabey.

== Timeline and social impact ==
"Omaha" the Cat Dancer was the first of several comic books in the early 1980s which integrated sex into their storylines, rather than using sexual explicitness for shock value. In 1988, Friendly Frank's, a comic book store in suburban Chicago, was fined $750 for selling "obscene" material, including "Omaha" the Cat Dancer; as a result of the obscenity controversy, the Comic Book Legal Defense Fund was formed. In 1990, issues of "Omaha" the Cat Dancer were seized by New Zealand authorities; the country's Obscene Publications Tribunal declared that the series was not indecent. In the same year, police in Toronto seized issues of the comic, claiming that it depicted bestiality.

Martin A. Stever reviewed Omaha, The Cat Dancer for Space Gamer/Fantasy Gamer No. 83. Stever commented that "the plot is so rich that it would be a disservice to attempt to sum it up in the small space available here. It is better said that it is a story that does not pull punches and in its essence rings more true to the values of our time than anything short of Tom Wolfe".

In Graphic Novels: A Bibliographic Guide to Book-Length Comics, D. Aviva Rothschild praised the series, finding the plot as strong, and the characters as three-dimensional and appealing. Entertainment Weekly writer Alex Heard panned the comic, writing that "the story moves very slowly [...] one can readily agree with the disgruntled fan who wrote, 'My God! Where did you dredge up those horrid characters?'"

In 1992, Kitchen Sink published two volumes of Images of "Omaha" as a benefit to pay for the treatment of Waller's bowel cancer. The volumes featured contributions by major comic book artists, such as Dave Sim, Alan Moore and Frank Miller. Trina Robbins, James Vance and Neil Gaiman have provided introductions to collected editions of the series. "Omaha" the Cat Dancer was nominated for Eisner Awards for Best Continuing Series, Best Black-and-White Series, and Best Writer/Artist in 1989; and Best Black and White Series and Best Writer in 1991.
