= Concrete (comics) =

Comic book series created and written by Paul Chadwick

Publication information
- Publisher: Dark Horse Comics
- Format: Limited series
- Genre: see below
- Publication date: 1986
- No. of issues: TBA

Creative team
- Written by: Paul Chadwick
- Artist: Paul Chadwick

Concrete is a comic book series created and written by Paul Chadwick and published by Dark Horse Comics.

The character's first appearance is Dark Horse Presents #1 (July 1986). The eponymous central character is a normal man whose brain was transplanted into a large, stone body by aliens, and who lives an extraordinary life on Earth following his escape.

The Concrete series focuses on realism. Apart from the aliens (which appear only in original series issue #3, in Concrete's recounting of his origin) and Concrete's own high-tech, artificial, stone body (which includes a host of attendant abilities), there are no supernatural or science fiction elements to any stories.

The hero tries to use his body for noble endeavors, such as helping out on a family farm. Later, Concrete climbs Mount Everest, becomes involved with a group of hardline environmental militants, and reluctantly agrees to become the spokesperson of a campaign to voluntarily reduce the Earth's population.

Concrete's sexuality is addressed in the series. An artist at heart, he collects paintings of female nudes. He is embarrassed at his lack of sexual organs; this is often the subject of hurtful jokes thrown his way.

Real-world physics apply to Concrete. Examples include Concrete breaking objects by sitting on them, or Concrete being shot forward from a braking car, due to the momentum of his large body. He is constantly breaking telephones and doorknobs, and must hire an assistant, Larry Munro, because his hands are too clumsy to handle a pen.

The series makes frequent use of thought balloons, showing characters' interior thoughts and feelings.

In addition to the comic, Paul Chadwick has drawn Concrete in many paintings. Most show the character wandering in nature, perhaps looking at a flower or some other natural curiosity.

== Character history ==
The series focuses on the life of Concrete, formerly Ron Lithgow, whose brain was involuntarily transplanted by aliens into a hulking artificial body which is made up of a substance that closely resembles concrete. As part of the back-story, he eventually escaped and made contact with the US Senator he worked for as a speechwriter. After a prolonged period of scientific tests and examinations, he was allowed to live on his own with the cover story that he was a cyborg constructed by the government.

In his new body, Concrete decides to use his tremendous strength, endurance and vision for a series of adventures he never thought of in his previous sedate life. Hiring a personal assistant writer and accompanied by a scientist who is assigned to monitor his body, Concrete has a wide variety of adventures.

== Awards and recognition ==
The series won the Eisner Awards for Best Continuing Series for 1988 and 1989, Best Black-and-White Series for 1988 and 1989, and Best New Series for 1988, and their Best Writer/Artist Award for Paul Chadwick for 1989. It received the Harvey Award for Best New Series in 1988, and won Chadwick their Award For Cartoonist (Writer/Artist) for 1989.

== Collections ==
- Concrete: Land and Sea, 1989, reprints "A Stone Among Stones" and "The Transatlantic Swim" with several pages of new art and story.
- Concrete: A New Life, 1989, reprints "Mountain With a Steel Heart" and "In the Glare of the Lights" with several pages of new art.
- Concrete: Odd Jobs, 1990, reprints the original issues #5 and #6, plus one new story set immediately after the events in #6, "What Needs to be Done".
- The Complete Concrete (TPB of the original 1987 ten-issue series)
- Concrete: Complete Short Stories 1986-1989
  - "Lifestyles of the Rich and Famous" from Dark Horse Presents #1, July 1986
  - "Under the Desert Stars" from Dark Horse Presents #2, September 1986
  - "The Four-Wheeled Sleeping Pill" from Dark Horse Presents #3, November 1986
  - "The Gray Embrace" from Dark Horse Presents #4, January 1987
  - "Burning Brightly Brightly" from Dark Horse Presents #5, February 1987
  - "Little Pushes" from Dark Horse Presents #6, April 1987
  - "Water God" from Dark Horse Presents #8, July 1987
  - "Straight in the Eye" from Dark Horse Presents #10, September 1987
  - "Next Best" from Dark Horse Presents #12, November 1987
  - "Now Is Now" from Dark Horse Presents #14, January 1988
  - "A Sky of Heads: With a Whimper" from Dark Horse Presents #16, March 1988
  - "A Sky of Heads: Quality Time" from Dark Horse Presents #18, May 1988
  - "Fitful Sleep" from Dark Horse Presents #20, July 1988
  - "Watching A Sunset" from Dark Horse Presents #20, July 1988
  - "Goodwill Ambassador" from Dark Horse Presents #22, September 1988
  - "Stay Tuned For Pearl Harbor" from Dark Horse Presents #28, March 1989
  - "Visible Breath" from Dark Horse Presents #32, August 1989
- Concrete: Complete Short Stories 1990-1995
  - "Fire at Twilight" from Dark Horse Presents #38, April 1990
  - "Like Disneyland, Only Toxic" & "A Billion Conscious Acts" from Concrete Celebrates Earth Day, April 1990
  - "What Needs to be Done" from Concrete: Odd Jobs, July 1990
  - "Objects of Value" from Dark Horse Presents Fifth Anniversary Special, April 1991
  - "American Christmas" from Within Our Reach, December 1991
  - "Byrdland's Secret" from Dark Horse Presents #66, September 1992
  - "King of the Early Evening" in black-and-white (the original was in color) from Concrete Eclectica #1, April 1993
  - "I Strive For Realism", in black-and-white (the original was in color) from Concrete Eclectica #2, May 1993
  - "Steel Rain" from San Diego Comic Con Comics #2, August 1993
  - "Enough World" from Dark Horse Presents #87, September 1994
  - "The Artistic Impulse" from Dark Horse Presents #100 [3], August 1995
- Concrete: Fragile Creatures (TPB of the 1991 four-issue limited series, in black-and-white (the earlier version was in color), plus "Fire at Twilight".
- Concrete: Killer Smile (TPB of the 1994 four-issue limited series)
- Concrete: Think Like A Mountain (TPB of the 1996 six-issue limited series)
- Concrete: Strange Armor (TPB of the 1997 five-issue limited series)
- Concrete: Three Uneasy Pieces (one-shot) collects the Concrete stories from Dark Horse Presents v.2 #1–#3, January 2012

Digest-Size TPBs

- Concrete: Volume One – Depths collects:
  - Concrete #1-5
  - "Lifestyles of the Rich and Famous", "Water God", and "Straight in the Eye" from Collected Stories 1986-1989
  - "Orange Glow" from Dark Horse Presents Annual 1999, August 1999
  - "Sympathy From A Devil" from Dark Horse Presents #150, January 2000
- Concrete: Volume Two – Heights collects:
  - Concrete #6-10
  - "Now Is Now" and "Goodwill Ambassador" from Collected Stories 1986-1989
  - "What Needs to be Done" from Collected Stories 1990-1995
  - "The Damp Descent" from Concrete Color Special #1, here in black-and-white, February 1989
- Concrete: Volume Three – Fragile Creature collects:
  - 1991 four-issue limited series
  - "The Gray Embrace", "Burning Brightly Brightly", "Little Pushes", and "Next Best" from Collected Stories 1986-1989
  - "Fire at Twilight", "Byrdland's Secret", and "The Artistic Impulse" from Collected Stories 1990-1995
- Concrete: Volume Four – Killer Smile collects:
  - 1994 four-issue limited series
  - "Under the Desert Stars", "The Four-Wheeled Sleeping Pill", and "Visible Breath" from Collected Stories 1986-1989
  - "Enough World", "King of the Early Evening", and "American Christmas" from Collected Stories 1990-1995
  - "The Lyle Committee", "The Ugly Boy", and "Jack O'Fingers" all from Concrete Eclectica #1, April 1993
  - "The Dictator's Dream" and "The Maiden of Crete" from Concrete Eclectica #2, May 1993
  - "Coming Soon: Emptiness", "Life Bomb", and "Frozen" from the Killer Smile series
  - "The Cave", "The Bore", "Earth's Birthday", "The Wish" and "The Arm" from the Think Like a Mountain series
  - "Family Night" from Dark Horse Maverick 2000, July 2000
- Concrete: Volume Five – Think Like a Mountain collects:
  - 1996 six-issue limited series
  - "A Sky of Heads: With a Whimper" and "Stay Tuned For Pearl Harbor" from Collected Stories 1986-1989
  - "Like Disneyland, Only Toxic", "A Billion Conscious Acts", and "Steel Rain" from Collected Stories 1990-1995
  - "Objects of Value" from Dark Horse Presents Fifth Anniversary Special, April 1991
  - "Riotus Life (Lost in Amazonis)" from Dark Horse Extra #1-4, June 1998
- Concrete: Volume Six – Strange Armor collects
  - 1997 five-issue limited series
  - "A Sky of Heads: Quality Time", "Fitful Sleep", and "Watching A Sunset" from Collected Stories 1986-1989
  - "I Strive For Realism" from Collected Stories 1990-1995
  - "A Sky of Heads" from Concrete Eclectica #2, May 1993
  - "World Beneath the Skin" from Dark Horse Decade #4, October 1996
  - "Running" and "On Van Gogh's 'The Bedroom'" previously unpublished
- Concrete: Volume Seven – The Human Dilemma collects
  - 2006 six-issue limited series
  - "Winter" one-page story
  - "Discovery" one-page story

== Variants ==
- Fragile Creatures, full color version, 1994
- Killer Smile, full color version, 1995
- Think Like a Mountain, full color version, 1997
- Strange Armor, full color version, 1998
- Concrete: Eclectica #1, color comic, April 1993, has color versions of "King of the Early Evening", "100 Horrors" #1, #2, and #3, and a nine-page art portfolio.
- Concrete: Eclectica #2, color comic, has color versions of "I Strive for Realism", "Soon, we'll all float in A Sky of Heads", "100 Horrors" #4, and a five-page art portfolio.
- Concrete Hero Special, April 1995, reprinted "Moving a Big Rock" with 2 alternate pages not published elsewhere. This was an eight-page story produced to promote the then upcoming "Think Like a Mountain" mini-series. Six pages of this story are actually straight from Think Like a Mountain #4, and appear both in the original issue and the collected editions. However, the first and last page of the story were redone for the Hero Special so the story would make sense in the context of eight pages. Much of the dialogue is the same as what appears in the original comics and collected editions, so there really isn't much difference between the two alternate pages that appear in the Hero Special and what appears in Think Like a Mountain #4 and the subsequent collected editions.

== In other media ==
A film based on the character was in pre-production during the early 1990s, with a script written by Larry Wilson and Paul Chadwick. The film was cancelled.
