= Zot! =

Comic book by Scott McCloud

- #11 was the first black & white issue of Zot!, effectively a reboot of the series written to stand independently from the first ten issues in color.

Publication information
- Publisher: Eclipse Comics
- Format: Ongoing series
- Genre: Superhero, Science Fiction, Romance, Drama
- Publication date: 1984–1990
- No. of issues: 36

Creative team
- Written by: Scott McCloud
- Artist: Scott McCloud

Collected editions
- Zot!: The Complete Black and White Collection: 1987–1991: ISBN 978-0-06-153727-1

Zot! is a comic book created by Scott McCloud in 1984 and published by Eclipse Comics until 1990 as a lighthearted alternative to the darker and more violent comics that dominated the industry during that period. There were a total of 36 issues, with the first ten in color and the remainder in black and white.

== Creation ==
McCloud credited Astro Boy creator Osamu Tezuka as a major influence on the book, making it one of the first manga-inspired American comic books. He also cited The Adventures of Tintin and Uncle Scrooge as inspirations.

== Publication history ==
Despite critical acclaim, Zot! was initially cancelled after 10 issues due to low sales in July 1985. However, McCloud and Eclipse came up with the idea of switching from color to black-and-white, and the comic was then able to run profitably from January 1987 to July 1991 before McCloud ended the series after a total of 36 issues. Issues #19-20 shipped together, and due to McCloud's honeymoon featured Chuck Austen inking the artist's pencils.

Eclipse planned to print the color issues as trade paperbacks to support the revived series, but the original color negatives were destroyed when their Guerneville, California headquarters flooded in 1986. Instead Eclipse funded new color separations by Dennis McFarling. The Original Zot! Book One (ISBN 0-91303-504-1) was released in August 1989 which collected issues 1–4 and included an introduction by McCloud. The Original Zot! Book Two followed in June 1990, containing issues 5-8.

Although the comic has been out of print, following the collapse of Eclipse it was collected by Kitchen Sink Press in Book One (ISBN 0-87816-427-8), which collected issues 1–10 and included an introduction by Kurt Busiek; Book 2 (ISBN 0-87816-428-6), which collected issues 11–15 and 17–18; and Book 3 (ISBN 0-87816-429-4) which collected issues 16 and 21–27. Book 4, collecting the "real world arc" of issues 28–36, was a casualty of Kitchen Sink's turmoil.

In 2000, ten years after the last print issue appeared, McCloud brought the series back in webcomic format under the title Zot! Online. He published the 440-panel story arc "Hearts And Minds" at Comic Book Resources. McCloud used an infinite canvas style for Zot! Online, using trails to instruct the reader what the reading order of the panels are.

In July 2008, HarperCollins published the complete black-and-white issues of the series (11–18 and 21–36) in a single volume. The collection also featured previously unpublished material and commentary by McCloud. The "Getting to 99" story from issues 19 and 20 was not included in its published form; instead, the volume contained only McCloud's breakdowns, as the finished artwork had been drawn by Chuck Austen. In addition, HarperCollins published a limited, signed collector's edition of this collection in November 2008.

== Plot summary ==
=== Issues 1–10: "Key to the Door" ===
Jenny Weaver, a normal lonely girl recently relocated to a new town, stumbles across Zot, a superhero from an alternate world who is chasing a troop of robots in pursuit of a key that will open a door hanging out in space. Jenny returns with Zot and her brother Butch to his world. They retrieve the key and take it to the authorities, but it is stolen again. Eventually their pursuit leads them to Sirius IV, a drab theocratic planet, home of the key. While there they uncover a plot to use the key, and the subsequent door opening, as an excuse to lead a holy war against Earth. To foil the plot Zot and Jenny take themselves through the door where they converse with the spirit of Sirius IV. Once out again they lead the revolt against the acting leader of planet who is tricked into goading his subjects on live television. Zot defeats the tyrant, but refuses to lead the planet, stating that they must learn to look after themselves.

=== Issues 11–27 ===
The next sequence features a series of super villains, each of which Zot must defeat in turn.

- Ignatius Rumboult Bellows was his planet's foremost scientist, pioneering the Industrial Revolution, but all his work is made obsolete when more sophisticated worlds share their technology. Bellows responds by determining that he will wipe out the technocrats of Earth.
- Zybox was a huge supercomputer, channelling most of North and South America's communication. When his creator is let go by the government, Zybox escapes to our world, plotting to kill everyone simultaneously and steal a soul for himself in an attempt to fully understand the human condition.
- A cult of de-evolutionaries who believe that coming down from the trees was a bad idea turn the lead cast into monkeys, before Zot manages to save the day.
- Dekko, a villain previously seen in the Key arc, engineers his release from a mental institution and turns up to Zot's birthday party. He is apparently determined to destroy the universe and recreate it with his own sense of order, but instead ends up delving further into his own psychosis.
- Getting to 99 is the only story not drawn by McCloud and features Zot flying deep into the bowels of an underground city (to the 99th floor) just in time to prevent it from being accidentally blown up.
- The Blotch was a gangster with a purple splotch for a head, who appears to be made entirely of some form of viscous liquid. When he becomes upset he loses control of his physical form and "melts down" into a large puddle.
- 9-Jack-9 (J9AC9K), who also featured in the Key to the Door arc, was an electronically transmitted assassin hired to finish off the president and his family of a distant planet. Zot tracks him down to his base, and during the ensuing battle Jack accidentally electrocutes his human operator, Sir John Shears. However, Jack, the programme, survives independently.
- Following a poll in which Zot! readers could vote for a character to be hit by a pie in the face, a special New Year's party is held in which all the villains and friends of Zot turn up, with said pie making many forays into the air, until finally hitting one of the assembled cast. At the end of this story Zot is stranded on Earth.

=== Issues 28–36 ===
These stories are usually referred to as the "Earth stories" as they feature Zot being stranded on Jenny's Earth. They are more character driven than the earlier stories and focus on Jenny's band of misfit friends. The final culmination of the arc is a cliff hanger in which the whole ensemble leaves to go to Zot's world, though not permanently. The arc also contained an entire Eisner Award nominated issue with Zot and Jenny talking about sex, and an issue dealing with Jenny's friend Terry being a lesbian.

=== Issues 10½ and 14½ ===
Matt Feazell usually drew a non-canonical stick figure back-up strip to Zot! in which the characters from the main story were featured in absurd or surreal situations, as well as having crossovers with Feazell's work and other Eclipse books. For two issues Feazell was allowed to take the helm and produced these stories, set in "dimension 10½", with McCloud providing a one-page back-up to issue 14 1/2.

== Themes ==
Throughout Zot!'s run the principal theme is the contrast between Zot's utopian world and Jenny's flawed version. The two lead characters find each other's worlds fascinating: Jenny desiring the tranquility of the parallel world and Zot embracing the challenges of Earth. Later on, teenage sexuality, bigotry, homosexuality and a sense of not belonging are all explored in a sensitive way, displaying Zot (and by association his world) as socially liberal.

== Characters ==
=== Heroes ===
- Zot (Zachary T. Paleozogt) – a blond haired, blue eyed teenage hero from an alternate Earth who flies via gravity boots and fights villains with a ten-shooter laser gun and boundless optimism.
- Jenny Weaver – a sensitive teenage girl from our world and the reader's point-of-view character throughout the series.
- Butch – Jenny's older brother, a typical blustering bully who, after a mishap in the first issue of the series, is transformed into a talking chimpanzee whenever he is on Zot's world.
- Uncle Max – Zot's uncle, an eccentric inventor, artist and surrogate parent whose gadgets help Zot fight crime.
- Peabody – Zot's robot butler/guardian.
- Woody – Jenny's nerdy but sweet "boyfriend" and close friend for the majority of the series
- Terry – Jenny's best friend
- Ronnie – a comic book obsessed writer
- Brandy – Ronnie's girlfriend, a thin bubbly, slightly ditzy, girl with an alcoholic mother
- George – a lazy genius determined to get straight D's only
- Spike (Bob) – a violent and rude comic book nerd
- Elizabeth – Spike's extremely quiet and fairly odd sister

=== Villains ===
Zot and his friends faced a number of enemies, including:

- Bellows – The main villain of the second arc and the only one of two villains (the other being Zybox) who was not introduced in the colour arc. Bellows is a psychopathic, megalomaniacal, and socially awkward inventor whose planet used to be dependent on his inventions before they were replaced by creations by another inventor. Bellows lost his mind and traveled to Zot’s planet, where they clashed before Bellows mysteriously traveled to Earth alongside Zot, where he was defeated. He reappears in the “Ring in the New” arc as The Blotch’s friend.
- 9-Jack-9 – assassin for hire who can travel through any electrical signal. Originally the astral projection of a man named Sir John Sheers, he was killed by Zot. Upon his death his astral form remained and is now a being of pure energy, even more dangerous than before.
- Dekko (Arthur Dekker) – Max's friend turned madman who slowly replaced his cancer-ridden body with robotic parts.
- The Devoes – a cult of humans who believe that coming out of the trees was a bad idea, hence the name de-evolutionaries. Use de-evolutionary guns to "revert" humans back into monkeys. They are generally unintelligent, and rarely have any chain of command (with the exception of Butch in the colour run), and wear football outfits.
- Zybox – a supercomputer hoping to acquire a soul.
- The Blotch – a gangster/businessman with a warped face trying to stay out of jail. When he feels any important emotional reaction, he may turn into a mass of strange liquid. In “Ring in the New” it is revealed that he can shape-shift when he turns into a cycloptic being.

== Zot's Earth ==
Using a portal created by Uncle Max, a link is created from contemporary Earth to the alternate reality of Zot. It is a retro-futuristic technological utopia, reminiscent of imagery from Golden Age SF, flying cars, robots and interplanetary travel are common and nearly all of its inhabitants benefit from peace, prosperity and a marked lack of conventional social ills. There also seem to be subtle differences in the essential nature of the two Earths, as on Zot's world events naturally favor the "good guys" in any conflict. Still, there are several commonalities between Zot's world and the "real" Earth, such as the careers of several popular musicians.

On Zot's utopian Earth, the year is permanently 1965. The inhabitants of Zot's world are unable to notice this, although Jenny and her friends from their Earth realize it. The true nature of Zot's world is never truly explained in the comic, and is left as a loose end, but it is hinted that Zot's world is a copy of the real one.

== Reception ==
Chester Brown was among those to praise the series. Several Amazing Heroes reviewers were also highly positive about Zot!, including Andy Mangels, Edd Vick, T.M. Maple, and Eddie Sacks.

== Awards ==
- 1985 Jack Kirby Award for Best New Series
- 1985 Russ Manning Most Promising Newcomer Award

=== Nominations ===
- 1988 Harvey Award for Best Cartoonist
- 1988 Eisner Award for Best Single Issue for Zot! #14
- 1988 Eisner Award for Best Continuing Series
- 1988 Eisner Award for Best Black-and-White Series
- 1988 Eisner Award for Best Writer/Artist
- 1991 Harvey Award for Best Writer for
- 1991 Harvey Award for Best Single Issue or Story for Zot! #33
- 1991 Eisner Award for Best Story or Single Issue for Zot! #33
- 1991 Eisner Award for Best Continuing Series
- 1991 Eisner Award for Best Black-and-White Series
- 1991 Eisner Award for Best Writer
- 1992 Harvey Award for Best Single Issue or Story for Zot! #35
