= Bad Machinery =

Webcomic set in England, by John Allison

- Author: John Allison
- Website: scarygoround.com
- Current status/schedule: Concluded
- Launch date: 21 September 2009
- Genre(s): Mystery, Comedy
- Preceded by: Scary Go Round 2002-06-04 to 2009-09-14

Bad Machinery is a webcomic written and drawn by John Allison and set in the fictional town of Tackleford, West Yorkshire, England. Bad Machinery started on 21 September 2009 loosely based on characters and situations from John Allison's previous webcomic, Scary Go Round. New full colour paneled pages appeared four times a week.

The story of Bad Machinery picks up three years after the end of Scary Go Round and involves two groups of schoolchildren that investigate mysteries.

== History ==
After the announcement of the end of Scary Go Round, John Allison answered readers' questions about the "new comic" in his blog, posted on 2009-09-13. He gave several hints as to the content of the new comic, indicating a preference to move away from writing about the lives of twenty-somethings, and the dispensing of many characters from Scary Go Round. In another post, the title of the new comic was revealed to be Bad Machinery, and each story (with the exception of the preamble) would be 100 pages long. The comic is named after a song by indie band Let's Active.

On 21 September 2009, after a one-week hiatus following the end of Scary Go Round, Bad Machinery was launched on the same web site that had previously hosted Scary Go Round, titled Scary Go Round Presents Bad Machinery.

As of 2021, ten collections of Bad Machinery storylines have been published by Oni Press in full-colour paperback, beginning with The Case of the Team Spirit, in March 2013.

== Content ==
In Bad Machinery, two groups of child investigators attend the fictional Griswalds Grammar School in Keane End, Tackleford. The groups interact and compete to solve the mysteries, keeping a tally on a wall. They are not always aware that they are both working on the same mystery or dilemma, as they start with different leads. Bad Machinery is primarily a comedy with elements of action and mystery.

== Publications ==
- Allison, John (2 April 2013). Bad Machinery Volume 1: The Case of the Team Spirit. Oni Press. ISBN 978-1620100844.
- Allison, John (25 March 2014). Bad Machinery Volume 2: The Case of the Good Boy. Oni Press. ISBN 978-1620101148.
- Allison, John (23 December 2014). Bad Machinery Volume 3: The Case of the Simple Soul. Oni Press. ISBN 978-1620101933.
- Allison, John (3 November 2015). Bad Machinery Volume 4: The Case of the Lonely One. Oni Press. ISBN 978-1620102121.
- Allison, John (20 April 2016). Bad Machinery Volume 5: The Case of the Fire Inside. Oni Press. ISBN 978-1620102978.
- Allison, John (29 November 2016). Bad Machinery Volume 6: The Case of the Unwelcome Visitor. Oni Press. ISBN 978-1620103517.
- Allison, John (30 May 2017). Bad Machinery Volume 7: The Case of the Forked Road. Oni Press. ISBN 978-1620103906.
- Allison, John (31 July 2019). Bad Machinery Volume 8: The Case of the Modern Men. Oni Press. ISBN 978-1620104378.
- Allison, John (8 January 2020). Bad Machinery Volume 9: The Case of the Missing Piece. Oni Press. ISBN 978-1620106686.
- Allison, John (26 January 2021). Bad Machinery Volume 10: The Case of the Severed Alliance. Oni Press. ISBN 978-1620108475.

== Reception ==
Describing Bad Machinery as her favorite webcomic of 2011, Lauren Davis of ComicsAlliance praised Bad Machinery for its absurd scenarios, and both she and Hannah Shannon of Bleeding Cool praised the webcomic's humorous dialogues. Shannon stated that the "eye candy art" of Bad Machinery is her favorite part of the webcomic, pointing out that the large page lay-out of the books presents all the details well.

Staff of The A.V. Club noted that Bad Machinery had difficulty finding its footing when it first started. Allison's attempt to differentiate Bad Machinery from Scary Go Round despite the overlap in cast resulted in a "bone dry" execution. As Allison got a feel for his new, younger cast, "the stories became looser and richer." The A.V. Club praised Allison's work as consistently reaching the "sweet spot of character-driven comedy," where humour arises naturally through the characters' dialogue.

In February 2016, Young Adult Library Services Association listed Volume 4 of Bad Machinery in its annual "Great Graphic Novels For Teens" list. Lore Sjöberg of Wired listed the webcomic among their best new webcomics of 2010 and Publishers Weekly listed Bad Machinery's first volume, The Case of the Team Spirit, among its best children's books of 2013.
