= Paul Chadwick =

American comic book creator (born 1957)

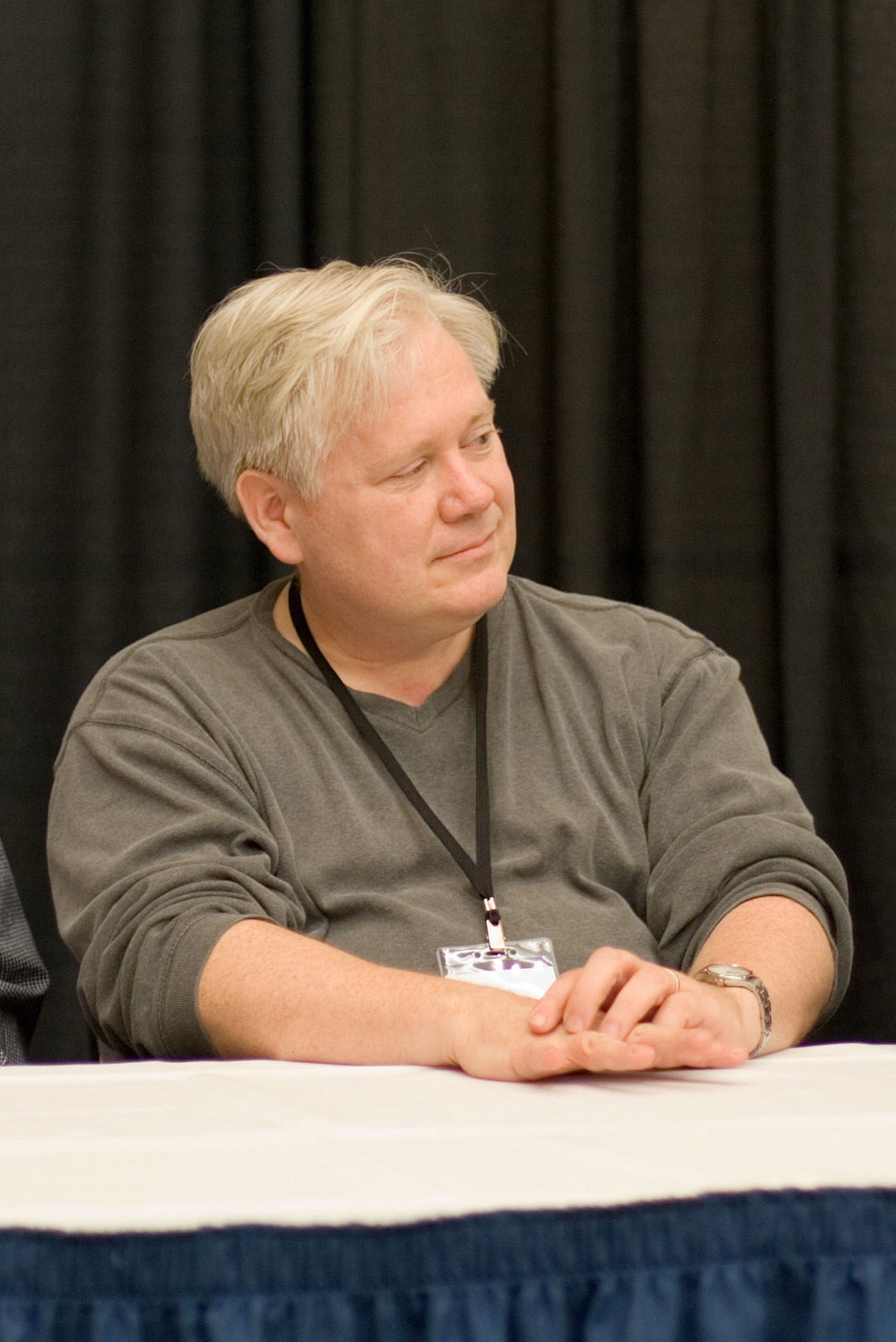
- Chadwick at the 2006 Stumptown Comics Fest
- Born: September 3, 1957 (age 69) Seattle, Washington, U.S.
- Areas: Writer, Penciller, Artist
- Awards: Inkpot Award (1994)

Paul Halsey Chadwick (born 1957) is an American comic book creator best known for his critically-acclaimed series Concrete, a realistic science fiction epic about a normal man trapped in a stone body.

== Biography ==
Born in Seattle, Chadwick grew up in its suburb Medina, where his father, Stephen F. Chadwick, was the city attorney. As a teenager, he participated in Apa-5, the amateur press alliance of comics fans, and in 1979 graduated from the Art Center College of Design, where he had majored in illustration.

Chadwick began his career creating storyboards for Disney, Warner Brothers, Lucasfilm and other film studios, contributing to such films as Pee Wee's Big Adventure, Strange Brew, The Big Easy, Ewoks: The Battle for Endor, Lies and Miracle Mile.

He drew the final issues of the comic book Dazzler, published in 1985 by Marvel Comics, before creating Concrete, first published by Dark Horse Comics in Dark Horse Presents #1 (July 1986). He wrote Gifts of the Night for DC Comics' Vertigo imprint, with art by John Bolton.

After working on several Matrix comics, Chadwick was asked by the Wachowskis to write the MMORPG The Matrix Online. He outlined the general story direction and offshoots of events in the game.

In May 2015, Chadwick announced he is working on a new Concrete series entitled Stars over Sand. In November 2017, he reported he was still at work on the story, describing it as Concrete being "hit by lightning and rendered amnesiac. He discovers the world anew, and, somewhat paranoid, becomes a danger to his loved ones and others."

Concrete: Stars Over Sand was released in June 2026.

== Awards ==
Chadwick won the Eisner Award for Best Writer/Artist (Team or Individual) for 1989, the Eisner Award for Best Writer/Artist in 2005, and won the Harvey Awards for Best Cartoonist (Writer/Artist) in both 1988 and 1989.

== Bibliography ==
=== DC Comics ===
- Gifts of the Night #1-4 (1998–99)
- Harlan Ellison's 7 Against Chaos graphic novel (2013)
- Y: The Last Man #16-17 (2004)

=== Dark Horse Comics ===
- Concrete #1-10 (1987–88)
- Concrete Color Special (1989)
- Concrete: Fragile Creature #1-4 (1991)
- Concrete: Killer Smile #1-4 (1994)
- Concrete: Think Like a Mountain #1-6 (1996)
- Concrete: Strange Armor #1-5 (1997–98)
- Concrete: The Human Dilemma #1-6 (2004–05)
- Concrete: Three Uneasy Pieces (one-shot) (2012)
- Star Wars: Empire #9-12, 15 (2003)
- Star Wars: A Valentine Story one-shot (2003)
- The World Below #1-4 (1999)
- The World Below: Deeper and Stranger #1-4 (1999-2000)
- Concrete: Stars Over Sand

=== Marvel Comics ===
- Dazzler #38-42 (1985–86)
- Deadpool #46-48 (2000)
- Doctor Strange: The Flight of Bones #3-4 (replaced original artist Tony Harris) (1999)

Preceded by M. D. Bright	Dazzler artist 1984-1985	Succeeded by None
