= Kate Worley =

American comic book writer (1958–2004)

- Born: March 16, 1958 Belleville, Illinois, U.S.
- Died: June 6, 2004 (aged 46)
- Area: Writer
- Notable works: Omaha the Cat Dancer
- Collaborators: Reed Waller

Kathleen Louise Worley (March 16, 1958 – June 6, 2004) was an American comic book writer. She is best known for her work on Omaha the Cat Dancer, a sexually explicit anthropomorphic animal comic book series about a female stripper, begun and illustrated by Reed Waller. Worley was also a musician, and a writer and performer for the science fiction comedy radio program Shockwave Radio Theater. She died in June 2004 of lung cancer.

== Biography ==
Worley was born in Belleville, Illinois on March 16, 1958. After moving to Minneapolis, Minnesota in the 1970s, she became one of the early contributors the Shockwave Radio Theater there.

While in the process of divorcing from her husband, she and cartoonist and musician Reed Waller began a romantic and professional relationship. Moving in together, they wrote songs and performed, both as a duet and with local bands, as well as being popular figures at Minicon and other science fiction conventions.

In the mid 1980s, Waller and Worley began collaborating on Omaha the Cat Dancer, which had originated as a strip by Waller in the local fanzine Vootie, before evolving into a nationally distributed comic book series published by Kitchen Sink Press. Four pages into issue #2, Waller suffered writer's block, and Worley offered "a few tentative suggestions about directions for the storyline, new characters, anything she could think of that might help...." At his invitation, she became the series' writer, enhancing its characterization and themes. In 1988, Waller identified them both as bisexual in the letters column of the series.

Omaha went on hiatus when Worley and Waller were both injured in a car accident; this hiatus was greatly extended when they had an acrimonious parting, which made their attempts at working together difficult. During this time, Worley wrote comics for various publishers, including Mulkon Empire for Tekno Comix, The Real Adventures of Jonny Quest for Dark Horse, Roger Rabbit for Disney, and a "Year One" annual issue of Wonder Woman. She married comic book writer Jim Vance, with whom she moved to Tulsa, Oklahoma, and had a son and daughter.

In 2002, she and Waller reached a deal with Fantagraphics to reprint Omaha, with an additional 100 pages. However, she was diagnosed with cancer, and she died June 6, 2004. Vance and Waller would later complete the Omaha series together, based on notes left by Worley.
