= Web Cartoonists' Choice Awards =

Webcomic peer award from 2001 to 2008

- Banner for the WCCA
- First award: 2001
- Final award: 2008
- Website: http://ccawards.com/

The Web Cartoonists' Choice Awards (WCCA) were annual awards in which established webcartoonists nominated and selected outstanding webcomics. The awards were held between 2001 and 2008, were mentioned in a New York Times column on webcomics in 2005, and have been mentioned as a tool for librarians.

== History ==
The WCCA represent a form of peer recognition, with voting rights granted only to creators working on online webcomics. Winners of awards receive an individualized web banner for their site, although MegaCon announced in 2007 that a live presentation would be made for the first time. In 2003, 2005 and 2006 the awards were presented in an online ceremony depicted in comic strip form and involving a number of creators.

The WCCA were started by Scott Maddix and Mark Mekkes in 2000, with the first awards made in 2001. Mekkes noted his motivation as being to "create a webcomic award process that would do the most to help the webcomic community and encourage creators to strive toward greatness." Mekkes set up a committee to run the awards, initially known as the Cartoonists' Choice Awards, assuming the position of chairman, a role he was still holding in 2007. A press release on The Dreamland Chronicles' nomination described the committee as "an independent organization dedicated to the promotion and recognition of online comics and their creators."

Other problems have included the award ceremony being delayed due to "technical difficulties". In 2006 it was not ready until five days after the winners had been announced.

== Eric Monster Millikin romance comics controversy ==
In 2006, voters chose Eric Millikin's horror/romance comic Eric Monster Millikin (then called Fetus-X) as one of the top five finalists for the "Outstanding Romance Comic" award; however, it was disqualified by the awards' executive committee. The WCCA committee wrote that "Foetus-X's [sic] nomination for "Outstanding Romance Comic" does not comply with the Outstanding Romance Comic category's genre criteria" of "addressing issues of love and romance in their stories, settings and characters." Fetus-X was disqualified despite the awards committee's position that "We never want to limit the voters choices in any way. ... It's been very important that we not 'water down' these awards by controlling the results ..."

This move was roundly criticized, with Comixtalk publisher Xaviar Xerexes saying "throwing out the Fetus X nomination a few years ago was a mistake, the WCCAs by definition are supposed to be based on votes and there should not have been any kind of 'veto' like the executive committee enacted." Websnark blogger Eric Burns complained that "if you're going to ask Webcartoonists to nominate who they think is the best in given categories, and then you drop their nominations because you don't agree with them ... then what exactly's the point?"

In 2007, Millikin's comic was again nominated for "Outstanding Romantic Comic," but was not disqualified by the executive committee. In 2008, the executive committee went to the lengths of removing the romance comics award and all other genre award categories in an attempt to avoid further controversy.
