= 1988 in comics =

Notable events of 1988 in comics.

== Events and publications ==
=== January ===
- January 16: The first episode of David Sutherland's gag comic Totally Gross Germs is published in The Beano.

=== February ===
- February 1:
  - The first episode of Bud Grace's Piranha Club appears in print. The series will run until 2018.
  - The first episode of Rick Detorie's newspaper comic One Big Happy is published.
- February 12: Belgian comic artist François Craenhals is knighted in the Order of the Belgian Crown.
- February 19:
  - The Dutch comics magazine Eppo Wordt Vervolgd changed its name to Sjors en Sjimmie Weekblad, based on the popularity of their signature series Sjors en Sjimmie. It continued until 1994, after which it was renamed as Sjosji.
  - In the first issue, Hanco Kolk and Peter de Wit's photo comic Mannetje en Mannetje makes its debut.

=== March ===
- March 14:
  - Time features cover and interior art for Superman's 50th anniversary by John Byrne and Jerry Ordway.
  - Batman: The Killing Joke by Alan Moore and Brian Bolland, is published by DC Comics.

=== April ===
- April 7: Morris receives a medal from the World Health Organization for making Lucky Luke a non-smoker after so many decades.
- April 10: FoxTrot by Bill Amend is launched by Universal Press Syndicate.
- April 17: The final episode of Kevin McCormick's Arnold is published.
- April 23:
  - The Journal of Luke Kirby series begins in 2000 AD #571 (IPC Media).
  - Action Comics #599 features the first Bonus Book, a free insert showcasing the work of new comics creators.
  - Teen Titans Spotlight is canceled by DC Comics with issue #21.
  - Sfida al Pantanal by Guido Nolitta and Stefano and Domenico Di Vitto (Bonelli; Mister No series).

=== May ===
- May 12: Two criminals try to kidnap Peanuts cartoonist Charles M. Schulz's wife, but are scared away in their attempt.
- May 24:
  - Action Comics, with issue #601, became a weekly anthology title. (This format lasted until issue #642, March 14, 1989.)
  - Action Comics #600: Golden anniversary issue featuring Superman and Wonder Woman in "Different Worlds," by John Byrne and George Pérez.
  - The Amazing Spider-Man #300: "Venom," by David Michelinie and Todd McFarlane.
  - Green Lantern Corps is canceled by DC with issue #224.
- May 28: Belgian comic artist Marc Sleen is declared an honorary citizen of Sint-Niklaas.

=== June ===
- The Evolutionary War crossover event takes place in Marvel Comics.
- La vittima senza nome by Claudio Nizzi and Gustavo Trigo, first album of the Nick Raider series (Bonelli)
- Tex il grande by Claudio Nizzi and Guido Buzzelli (Bonelli) ; first of Tex Willer's special albums (also called "Giant Tex " or "Texone") of large format and often made by artists outside the publishing house.

=== July ===
- July 1–3: The first annual Harvey Awards are organized and presented at the Chicago Comicon.
- Tales of the Teen Titans is canceled by DC with issue #91.
- Incubi by Tiziano Sclavi and Gallieno Ferri (Bonelli), the longest story of Zagor ever made; it is set in a parallel universe and shows the death of the hero himself.

=== August ===
- August 14: In the Italian Disney comics magazine Topolino Little Gum makes his debut in the story Paperinik e l’incredibile Little Gum by Giulio Chierchini.
- August 26: Belgian comics character Jommeke receives his first statue. It is revealed in front of the library of Beveren, but is destroyed by vandals a few years later.

=== October ===
- October 3:
  - The first episode of Ray Billingsley's Curtis is published.
  - The first episode of Bill Holbrook's newspaper comic Safe Havens is published.
- October 5: The first episode of Raoul Cauvin and Malik's gag comic Cupidon are published in Spirou.
- October 16:
  - The final episode of Lee Holley's comic strip Ponytail is published.
  - "Inferno", company-wide Marvel Comics crossover debuted, involving the mutant titles The Uncanny X-Men, X-Factor, The New Mutants, and Excalibur, as well as the X-Terminators limited series and various other Marvel titles.

=== November ===
- November 4-5-6: During the Stripdagen in The Hague Toon van Driel wins the Stripschapprijs. Wilbert Plijnaar, Jan van Die and Robert van der Kroft win the Jaarprijs voor Bijzondere Verdiensten (nowadays the P. Hans Frankfurtherprijs).
- Creator's Bill of Rights signed in Northampton, Massachusetts, by Steve Bissette, Craig Farley, Gerhard, Mark Martin, Larry Marder, Michael Zulli, Ken Mitchroney, Scott McCloud, Dave Sim, Rick Veitch, Peter Laird, Kevin Eastman, and the artists of Mirage Studios.
- Black Orchid #1 (of 3), the first American comic written by Neil Gaiman, published by DC Comics.
- Star Trek is canceled by DC Comics with issue #56.
- The Draft, a New Universe one-shot, is published by Marvel Comics.
- Concrete vol. 1 is canceled by Dark Horse with issue #10.

=== December ===
- December 11: In the Italian Disney comics magazine Topolino, Arizona Goof and his rival Kranz made their debut in The Lost Temple, by Bruno Sarda and Maria Luisa Uggetti.
- December 27:
  - The gag comic Schanulleke, a spin-off of Suske en Wiske, is launched in Okki by Willy Vandersteen, written by Patty Klein and drawn by Eric De Rop.
- Aristocratic Xtraterrestrial Time-Traveling Thieves is cancelled by Comics Interview with issue #12.
- Mazinger by Go Nagai is published by First Comics.
- New Teen Titans vol. 2 changes its name to The New Titans with issue #50.
- Silver Surfer #1 (of 2), an out-of-continuity mini-series by Stan Lee and Moebius, are published by Marvel.
- The Warlord is canceled by DC Comics with issue #133.
- "Semper Fi" #1 is published by Marvel Comics.

=== Specific date unknown ===
- The final episode of Peter Pontiac's punk comic Gaga is printed.
- Gary Panter releases the graphic novel Jimbo: Adventures in Paradise.
- Brought to Light, a political anthology of two nonfiction stories, is published by Eclipse Comics. Both are based on material from lawsuits filed by the Christic Institute against the U.S. Government. The two stories are "Shadowplay: The Secret Team," by Alan Moore and Bill Sienkiewicz; and "Flashpoint: The LA Penca Bombing," documented by Martha Honey and Tony Avirgan and adapted by Joyce Brabner and Tom Yeates.
- Someplace Strange a graphic novel written by Ann Nocenti, with artwork by John Bolton, is published by the Marvel Comics imprint Epic Comics.
- Marvel Graphic Novel #34: Cloak and Dagger: Predator and Prey, by Bill Mantlo and Larry Stroman is published by Marvel.

== Deaths ==
=== January ===
- January 4: Henfil, Brazilian comics artist (Zeferino, Bode Orellana, Os Fradins, Orelhão, Urubu, Pó de Arroz, Bacalhau, Ubaldo, Paranóico, Graúna), dies at age 43 from AIDS.
- January 30: Homer Brightman, American animation screenwriter and comics writer (original scriptwriter of Al Taliaferro's Donald Duck comic strip), dies at age 86.

=== February ===
- February 11: Lino Landolfi, Italian comics artist (Procopio), dies at age 62.
- February 25: Dori Seda, American underground comics artist (Lonely Nights Comics: Stories To Read When the Couple Next Door Is Fucking Too Loud), dies of respiratory failure at age 37.
- February 4: Frank Giacoia, American comics artist (worked on The Amazing Spider-Man, Captain America), dies at age 63.
- February 13: Ron Embleton, British comics artist (Wulf the Briton, Oh, Wicked Wanda) dies of a heart attack at age 57.

=== March ===
- March 2:
  - Enrodi István, Hungarian designer and comics artist, dies at age 67.
  - Leslie Turner, American comics artist (continued Wash Tubbs, which eventually became Captain Easy), dies at age 88.
- March 6: Jack Binder, American comics artist (Daredevil), dies at age 86.
- March 8: Jan Kraan, Dutch illustrator, animator and comics artist, dies at age 87.
- March 26: Rit-Ola, Swedish comics artist (Biffen och Bananen), dies at age 82.
- March 31: Georges Lévis (Jean Sidobre), French comics artist, dies at age 63.

=== April ===
- April 3: Milton Caniff, American comics artist (Terry and the Pirates, Dickie Dare, Steve Canyon, Male Call), dies at age 81 from lung cancer.
- April 8: Clem Gretter, American comics artist (Sue to Lou, assisted Harry "A" Chesler and Ripley's Believe It or Not), dies at age 83.
- April 9: Benoît Jaminon (Marée Basse), Belgian comic artist, dies at age 29 in a house fire.
- April 10: Gene Fawcette, American comics artist (worked on Our New Age), dies at age 68.
- April 16: Siauw Tik Kwie, Indonesian comics artist (Sie Djin Koei, Kang Lam Hiap Soe), dies at age 74.

=== May ===
- May 17: Al Wiseman, American comics artist (assisted on Dennis the Menace comic books, Belvedere), dies at age 69.

=== June ===
- June 6: Willi Kohlhoff, German illustrator and comics artist (comics based on Robinson Crusoe), dies at age 82.
- June 7: Octave Joly, Belgian comics writer (Les Belles Histoires de l'Oncle Paul), dies at age 78.
- June 16: Andrea Pazienza, Italian comics artist (Massimo Zanardi), dies at age 32 from a heroin overdose.
- June 25: Evert Werkman, Dutch journalist, poet, columnist and comics writer (Kapitein Rob, Frank, de Vliegende Hollander), dies at age 73.

=== July ===
- Specific date unknown: Julius Stafford Baker II, British comics artist (continued Tiger Tim), dies at age 84.

=== August ===
- August 7: Wilfred Jackson, American animator (Walt Disney Company), dies at age 82.

=== September ===
- September 6: Roger Bussemey, French comics artist (Moky et Poupy), dies at age 67.
- September 11: Roger Hargreaves, British illustrator and comics writer/artist (Mr. Men, Little Miss), dies at age 53 from a stroke.
- September 12: Mars Ravelo, Filipino comics artist (Darna, Dyesebel, Captain Barbell, Lastikman, Bondying, Varga, Wanted: Perfect Mother, Hiwaga, Maruja, Mariposa, Roberta, Rita, Buhay Pilipino, Jack and Jill, Flash Bomba, Tiny Tony, and Dragonna), dies at age 71.
- September 14: Frits Kloezeman, Dutch illustrator and comics artist (made comics based on Judge Dee and Rick de Kikker, worked for Marten Toonder Studios), dies at age 64.
- September 25: Barrie Phillip Nichol, American novelist, poet and comics artist (Scraptures, Grease Ball Comics), dies at age 43.
- September 27: Paul Reinman, American comics artist and inker for Jack Kirby, dies at age 78.
- September 28: Charles Addams, American cartoonist and comics artist (The Addams Family), dies from a heart attack at age 76.

=== October ===
- October 25: Eric Larson, American animator (Walt Disney Company), dies at age 83.

=== November ===
- November 7: Bill Hoest, American comics artist (The Lockhorns), dies at age 62 from cancer.

=== December ===
- December 3: Jean David, French illustrator, cartoonist and comics artist (Les Amours de Barbara Smith), dies at age 82 or 83.
- December 11: Frank S. Pepper, British comics writer (Roy of the Rovers, Captain Condor, Jet-Ace Logan), dies at age 78.
- December 12: Tarpé Mills, American comics artist (Miss Fury), dies at age 73.
- December 17: Alberto Solsona (Agar-agar, Arturito King, Cartulino), dies at age 41.
- December 19: Robert Bernstein aka R. Berns, American comics writer, playwright and concert impresario (DC Comics, EC Comics), dies from heart failure at age 69.
- December 26: Herluf Bidstrup, Danish comics artist and cartoonist, dies at age 76.

=== Specific date unknown ===
- Leo Bothas, German illustrator (made Nazi propaganda comics during World War II), dies at 84 or 85.
- Dan Gormley, American comics artist (comics for Dell Publishing, Disney comics, worked on Nancy), dies at age 69 or 70.

== Exhibitions and shows ==
- June 27–August 10: Galería Esquina de la Libertad (San Francisco) — "Spain: a View from the Bottom: Posters, Comic Strips, Caricatures and More."
- November 25, 1988 – March 4, 1989: Cartoon Art Museum (San Francisco) — "The Face Behind the Laugh: Cartoonists' Self-Caricatures from the Collections of Mark J. Cohen"

== Conventions ==
- January 29–31: Angoulême International Comics Festival (Angoulême, France) — 15th annual festival
- April 23–24: Wonderful World of Comics Convention (Oakland Convention Center, Oakland, California) — 2nd iteration of what eventually becomes known as WonderCon
- Summer: Dragon Con (Piedmont Plaza Hotel, Atlanta, Georgia) — 1,700 attendees
- Summer: FantaCon (Albany, New York) — horror/comics show returns after a four-year hiatus
- June: Heroes Convention (Charlotte, North Carolina)
- June 16–19: International Superman Expo (Cleveland Convention Center, Cleveland, Ohio) — commemorating Superman's 50th anniversary; official guests include Curt Swan, Jerry Ordway, George Pérez, Marv Wolfman, and Julius Schwartz
- June 24–26: Atlanta Fantasy Fair XIII (Atlanta Hilton and Towers, Atlanta, Georgia) — guest of honor: Stan Lee; official guests include Mark Gruenwald, Archie Goodwin, Steven Grant, Bob Burden, Kevin Maguire, Julius Schwartz, and Chris Claremont
- June 24–26: Comix Fair '88 (Ramada Hotel Southwest, Houston, Texas) — guests include Sergio Aragonés, Kim DeMulder, Mike Leeke, and William Messner-Loebs
- June 25–26: Creation Con I (Penta Hotel, New York City)
- July 1–3: Chicago Comicon (Ramada O'Hare, Rosemont, Illinois) — c. 5,000 attendees; special guests: Max Allan Collins and Dick Locher; other guests: Bernie Wrightson, Michael Kaluta, Dave Stevens, and Chris Claremont
- July 1–3: Dallas Fantasy Fair I (Sheraton Park Central, Dallas, Texas) — guests include Harvey Kurtzman, Burne Hogarth, and Gil Kane
- July 22–24: Memphis Fantasy Convention V (Garden Plaza Hotel, Memphis, Tennessee) — guests include Michael Kaluta, Joe Staton, and John Ostrander
- August 4–7: San Diego Comic-Con (Convention and Performing Arts Center and Omni Hotel, San Diego, California) — 8,000 attendees; official guests: Art Adams, Robert Asprin, Jules Feiffer, Ray Feist, David Gerrold, Matt Groening, George R.R. Martin, Matt Wagner
- October 7–9: Dragon*Con (Piermont Plaza Hotel, Atlanta, Georgia) — guests include Alan Dean Foster, Fred Saberhagen, Margaret Weis, Tracy Hickman, Gary Gygax, and Larry Elmore
- September 24: UKCAK88 (The Institute of Education, London, England) — presentation of the Eagle Awards
- November 25–27: Creation Con II (Penta Hotel, New York City)
- November 25–27: Dallas Fantasy Fair II (Marriott Park Central, Dallas, Texas)

== Awards ==
=== Eisner Awards ===
Presented in 1989 for comics published in 1988:

- Best Single Issue/Single Story: Kings in Disguise #1, by James Vance and Dan Burr (Kitchen Sink Press)
- Best Black-and-White Series: Concrete, by Paul Chadwick (Dark Horse Comics)
- Best Continuing Series: Concrete, by Paul Chadwick (Dark Horse)
- Best Finite Series/Limited Series: The Silver Surfer: Parable, by Stan Lee and Jean "Moebius" Giraud (Marvel Comics)
- Best New Series: Kings in Disguise, by James Vance and Dan Burr (Kitchen Sink)
- Best Graphic Album: Batman: The Killing Joke, by Alan Moore and Brian Bolland (DC Comics)
- Best Writer: Alan Moore, Batman: The Killing Joke (DC)
- Best Writer/Artist: Paul Chadwick, Concrete (Dark Horse)
- Best Artist/Penciller/Inker or Penciller/Inker Team: Brian Bolland, Batman: The Killing Joke (DC)
- Best Art Team: Alan Davis and Paul Neary, Excalibur (Marvel)
- Bob Clampett Humanitarian Award: Phil Yeh
- Will Eisner Award Hall of Fame: Harvey Kurtzman

== First issues by title ==
=== DC Comics ===
Animal Man

Release: September Writer: Grant Morrison. Artists: Chas Truog and Doug Hazlewood.

Checkmate

Release: April Writer: Paul Kupperberg. Artists: Steve Erwin and Al Vey.

C.O.P.S.

Release: August Writer: Doug Moench. Artists: Pat Broderick and Pablo Marcos.

Hellblazer

Release: January Writer: Jamie Delano. Artist: John Ridgway.

Starman

Release: October Writer: Roger Stern. Artists: Tom Lyle and Bob Smith.

Wanderers

Release: June. Writer: Doug Moench. Artists: Dave Hoover and Robert Campanella.

==== Limited series ====
Batman: The Cult (4 issues)

Release: August Writer: Jim Starlin. Artist: Bernie Wrightson.

Black Orchid (3 issues)

Release: November Writer: Neil Gaiman. Artist: Dave McKean.

Cosmic Odyssey (4 issues)

Release: December Writer: Jim Starlin. Artist: Mike Mignola.

Crimson Avenger (4 issues)

Release: June Writers: Roy and Dann Thomas. Artist: Greg Brooks.

Millennium (8 weekly issues)

Release: January Writer: Steve Englehart. Artists: Joe Staton and Ian Gibson.

Power Girl (4 issues)

Release: June. Writer: Paul Kupperberg. Artists: Rick Hoberg and Arne Starr.

The Prisoner: Shattered Visage (4 issues)

Release. Writer/Artist: Dean Motter.

Unknown Soldier (12 issues)

Release: Winter. Writer: James Owsley. Artist: Phil Gascoine.

The Weird (4 issues)

Release: July. Writer: Jim Starlin. Artist: Bernie Wrightson.

=== Kodansha ===
Natsuko no Sake

Release: on Weekly Morning. Author: Akira Oze.

=== Marvel ===
Count Duckula

Release: November from Star Comics. Writer: Michael Gallager. Artist: Warren Kremer.

Death's Head

Release: December from Marvel UK. Writer: Simon Furman. Artists: Bryan Hitch and Mark Farmer.

Doctor Strange, Sorcerer Supreme

Release: November Writer: Peter Gillis. Artists: Richard Case and Randy Emberlin.

Dragon's Claws

Release: June from Marvel UK. Writer: Simon Furman. Artist: Geoff Senior.

Excalibur

Release: October Writer: Chris Claremont. Artist: Alan Davis.

Marvel Comics Presents

Release: September Editors: Terry Kavanagh and Michael Higgins.

The Punisher War Journal

Release: November Writer/Penciller: Carl Potts. Inker: Jim Lee.

Wolverine

Release: November Writer: Chris Claremont. Artists: John Buscema and Al Williamson.

==== Limited series ====
Nick Fury vs. S.H.I.E.L.D. (6 issues)

Release: June. Writer: Bob Harras. Artists: Paul Neary and Kim DeMulder.

Stray Toasters (4 issues)

Release: by Epic Comics. Writer/Artist: Bill Sienkiewicz.

X-Terminators (4 issues)

Release: October Writer: Louise Simonson. Artist: Jon Bogdanove.

=== Independent titles ===
==== Ongoing series ====
- AARGH (Mad Love)
- The Adventures of Tintin: Breaking Free (Attack International, April)
- Aquablue (Delcourt, April )
- Brought to Light (Eclipse Comics)
- Captain Power and the Soldiers of the Future (Continuity Comics, August)
- Crisis (Fleetway, September )
- Deadline (Deadline Publications Ltd., October)
- Dinosaurs for Hire (Eternity Comics, March)
- Faust: Love of the Damned (Northstar Publishing, December). Writer: David Quinn. Artist: Tim Vigil.
- The Forever War (Dupuis)
- Fright Night (Now Comics, October)
- Maze Agency (Comico Comics, December)
- The Real Ghostbusters (Now Comics, August)
- Shaloman (Mark 1 Comics)
- Taboo (Spiderbaby Grafix, Fall)
- Terminator (Now Comics, September)
- The Tick (New England Comics, June)
- The True North (Comic Legends Legal Defense Fund, August)

==== Limited series ====
- Aliens (6 issues)

Release: May by Dark Horse Comics. Writer: Mark Verheiden. Artist: Mark A. Nelson.

- Black Kiss (12 issues)

Release: June by Vortex Comics. Writer/Artist: Howard Chaykin.

- Crossroads (First Comics, July, 5 issues)
- Godzilla (Dark Horse Comics, May, 6 issues) — American adaptation of the manga adaptation of the Japanese film Gojira 1984
- Kings in Disguise (Kitchen Sink Press, March, 6 issues)

== Initial appearance by character name ==
=== DC Comics ===
- Black Orchid in Black Orchid #01 (November)
- Deacon Blackfire in Batman: The Cult #01 (August)
- Phantasm in New Teen Titans Annual #03
- G'nort in Justice League International #10 (February)
- Gloss in Millennium #02 (January)
- Godiva in The New Teen Titans Annual #03
- Grandmaster in Millennium #01 (January)
- KGBeast in Batman #417 (March)
- L-Ron in Justice League International #14 (June)
- Legs in Detective Comics #587 (June)
- Major Force in Captain Atom #12 (February)
- Ratcatcher in Detective Comics #585 (April)
- Shrapnel in Doom Patrol #07 (April)
- Cornelius Stirk in Detective Comics #592 (November)
- Supergirl (Matrix) in Superman #16 (April)
- Ventriloquist in Detective Comics #583 (February)
- The Weird in The Weird #01 (July)
- Jewelee in Secret Origins #28 (July)
- Ice in Justice League International #12 (April)
- V in V for Vendetta #01 (September)
- Dawn Granger in Hawk and Dove #01 (October)
- William Payton in Starman #01 (October)
- Papa Midnite in Hellblazer #01 (January)
- Eddie Lawton in Deadshot #02 (December)
- Reactron in Doom Patrol #10 (July)
- Queen Bee in Justice League International #16 (August)
- Zed in Hellblazer #04 (April)
- Dorothy Spinner in Doom Patrol #14 (November)
- Punch in Secret Origins #28 (July)
- Jet in Millennium #02 (January)

=== Marvel Comics ===
- Robbie Baldwin in The Amazing Spider-Man Annual #22
- Bullet in Daredevil #250 (January )
- Marlo Chandler in The Incredible Hulk #347 (September )
- Firepower in Iron Man #230 (May)
- Gosamyr in New Mutants #66 (August )
- Jessan Hoan in Uncanny X-Men #229 (May)
- Lobo Brothers in Spectacular Spider-Man #143 (October )
- Al MacKenzie in Nick Fury vs. S.H.I.E.L.D. #3 (August )
- Taki Matsuya in X-Terminators #1 (October )
- N'astirh in X-Factor #32 (October )
- Kate Neville in Nick Fury vs. S.H.I.E.L.D. #3 (August )
- Alexander Pierce in Nick Fury vs. S.H.I.E.L.D. #3 (August )
- Puff Adder in Captain America #337 (January )
- Tarantula in Web of Spider-Man #35 (February )
- Tombstone in Web of Spider-Man #36 (March )
- Typhoid Mary in Daredevil #254 (May)
- Viper in Nick Fury vs. S.H.I.E.L.D. #3 (August )
- X-Terminators in X-Terminators #1 (October )

=== Independent titles ===
- Luke Kirby in 2000 AD #571 (IPC Media, April 23)
- Piccolo in Weekly Shōnen Jump #167 (Shueisha, April 4)
- Rat King in Tales of the Teenage Mutant Ninja Turtles #4 (Mirage Studios, February )
- Shaloman in Shaloman #1 (Mark 1 Comics)
- Son Gohan in Dragon Ball chapter #196 (Shueisha)
- Tick in The Tick #1 (New England Comics, June)
- Vegeta in Weekly Shōnen Jump #204 (Shueisha, December 19)
