= Vs. System =

System used for collectible card games

- VS System cardback design
- Designers: Matt Hyra, Mike Hummel, Edward Fear, Danny Mandel
- Publishers: Upper Deck
- Publication: April 2004; 22 years ago
- Players: 2 ^{1}
- Setup time: < 5 minutes
- Playing time: < 30 minutes
- Skills: Card playing Simple math Deck optimization Planning; Deception
- ^{1} Some casual rules allow more players.

Vs. System (short for Versus System), also written as VS System and abbreviated as VS, is a collectible card game designed by Upper Deck Entertainment (UDE). In the game, players build and play a deck of Vs. System cards in an attempt to win a game against their opponent. It was first published in 2004 and is set in the superhero genre. The game was discontinued by UDE in January 2009.

UDE announced at the 2014 Gen Con Indianapolis that they would be letting convention-goers playtest a subset of Marvel Origins reprinted as "Vs. System Living Card Game". UDE then relaunched Vs. System at the 2015 Gen Con Indianapolis in its updated 2PCG format, switching from the traditional, partially-randomized card distribution model of most CCGs to a non-random, fixed-distribution model.

== Superheroic setting ==
The sets of the Vs. System are based on the superheroic settings of Marvel and DC Comics, with the exception of a smaller set called the Hellboy Essential Collection. For the most part, expansion sets alternated release between Marvel-based sets and DC Comics-based sets with new sets every three to six months. All sets are interchangeable and compatible with each other and share the same card back. This allows players to mix characters fighting against or with each other.

Card art, characters, and gameplay concepts are inspired by their comic book appearances with the designers using what they describe as "top-down design", meaning they make every attempt to develop a character's card mechanics in keeping with how the character is represented in comic books. Artists who have contributed card art include Alex Ross, John Van Fleet, Alex Garner, Jim Lee, Rachel Dodson, and Bill Sienkiewicz.

== Gameplay ==
The Vs. System attempts to emulate superhero battles. Each player starts the game with 50 "endurance points". If a player has zero or negative endurance at the end of the Recovery Phase, they are knocked out of the game. The Vs. System Comprehensive Rules has an in-depth explanation of every aspect of the game and is official for use in tournament judging.

=== Types of cards ===
There are four types of cards in the Vs. System, with color-coded frames: Character (usually red, but black for "concealed" characters), Equipment (gray), Location (green), and Plot Twist (blue). All four types of cards share a common layout.

=== Phases of gameplay ===
- Draw Phase: Each player simultaneously draws two cards from their deck.
- Build Phase: Starting with the player holding the initiative, and going clockwise, each player completes the following steps:
  - Resource Step: They may place one card face down into the resource row.
  - Recruit Step: They may spend resource points to recruit characters and/or equipment. Resource points are determined at the beginning of the Recruit step by how many cards a player has in their resource row.
  - Formation Step: They may rearrange their characters between their front and support rows. They may also transfer "Transferable" equipment during this step.

After the player with the initiative completes their steps within the Build Phase, each other player completes theirs in turn. Once each player finishes, the Build Phase ends and the Combat Phase begins.

- Combat Phase: Starting with the player holding the initiative, each player has an "Attack Step" where they may declare attacks with the characters they control against their opponent's characters, or directly against an opposing player if they don't control any non-stunned visible characters. The player with the initiative attacks with all legal attackers, or until they wish to pass. This Attack Step is repeated for each player, going clockwise, from the player with the initiative. Once each person has completed their Attack Step, the Combat Phase ends and the Recovery Phase begins.
- Recovery Phase: At the end of the Recovery Phase, during the "wrap-up" portion, each player compares endurance totals, and all players with 0 or less endurance lose the game. If this would leave no players still in the game, the player with the highest endurance total wins the game. Then all players may simultaneously recover one stunned character, KO all remaining stunned characters, and ready all objects (characters, locations, equipment) they control. Once these steps are performed, the initiative passes clockwise to the next player, the Recovery Phase ends, and the next turn commences with the Draw Phase.

=== Variant rules ===
- Grand Melee: A regular game of Vs. System for any number of players, last man standing wins.
- Team Alliance: A 2-on-2 game of Vs. System, teammates sit across from each other. The game plays just like grand melee, but teammates share an endurance total of 100 and cannot attack each other. The game is played until only one team is left.
- Two-Headed Mutant: A 2-on-2 game of Vs. System, teammates sit next to each other across from their opponents. Each team begins the game with 100 endurance. This game variant can be played with any number of people on either team, as long as the teams are even numbered. 50 endurance is added onto the total endurance score for each person on a team. Therefore, a Three-Headed Mutant would see a game with 150 endurance.
- Ideal Draw: A regular game of Vs. System with the only difference being during the Draw Phase, instead of drawing top two cards from their decks, players search for two cards and put those in their hands.

== Card sets ==
All cards are marked in the lower left with an expansion code or set code: a three-letter code identifying the set in which the card was published. The first letter of the set code indicates the setting (D for DC Comics and M for Marvel Comics), except for the Essential Collection set, which starts with the letter E.

Most Vs. System cards are released in expansion sets, of which there were a total of 18. The first 14 expansion sets all had either 165 or 220 cards, but starting with Marvel Legends, which had 273 cards, the size of expansion sets grew larger, peaking at 330 cards of the Marvel Universe set. Marvel Legends also debuted a card face layout redesign.

The game was also periodically supplemented by the release of starter deck sets, of which there were a total of 6. The starter deck sets each contained two playable 40 card mini-decks. They pitted two teams against each other, typically a "hero" team versus a "villain" team. The first three (X-Men vs. the Brotherhood, Spider-Man vs. Doc Ock, and Batman vs. the Joker) drew all their cards from other expansion sets. However, the last three (Batman, Fantastic Four, and X-Men) contained new cards not in expansions sets. Each of the last three starter sets also were published to coincide with an associated film also released that year (Batman Begins, Fantastic Four, and X-Men: The Last Stand, respectively). UDE had originally planned to release a seventh starter set, for Superman (to coincide with the 2006 Superman Returns movie), but that set was utlimately cancelled and never released.

Additionally, UDE planned an Essential Collections line geared toward introducing characters from outside the Marvel and DC Universes. However, only one such set was ever released, the Hellboy Essential Collection. It contained two pre-constructed 60-card decks, a comprehensive rule book, and a number of other extras. Like the starter decks, the Hellboy Essential Collection is tournament-legal.

UDE also planned a Giant-Size line. However, the only set ever published in the line was The Coming of Galactus, a set geared toward multiplayer play in which multiple players would be pitted against a single powerful player taking on the role of Galactus. All cards in the set were legal for tournament play, with the exception of an oversized Galactus card and "Planet" cards.

Finally, there were exclusive sets, consisting of promotional cards associated with a particular expansion set released through venues such as conventions and tournaments. The exclusives sets are listed here rather than in the table below. The five exclusive sets (with set codes in parentheses) were:

- Associated with Marvel Legends: Age of Apocalypse (MAA) and Marvel Exclusives (MEX)
- Associated with DC Legends: DC Exclusives (DCX)
- Associated with Marvel Universe: Marvel Equipment (MEQ) and Marvel Ultimates (MUL)

The following table lists all non-exclusive sets in chronological order of release:

Release order (expansion sets only)	Set name	Set code	Setting	Set type	Date	Featured teams	Teams introduced	Size (number of cards)	New mechanics and notable features
1	Marvel Origins	MOR	Marvel Comics	Expansion set	April 2004	X-Men; Brotherhood; Doom; Fantastic Four; Sentinels	X-Men; Brotherhood; Doom; Fantastic Four; Sentinels; Skrull; Negative Zone	220	First set
N/A	X-Men vs. the Brotherhood Starter Deck	MOR (same as for Marvel Origins)	Marvel Comics	Starter set	April 2004	X-Men; Brotherhood	None	80 total, all reprints	All cards are drawn from the Marvel Origins expansion set
N/A	Spider-Man vs. Doc Ock Starter Deck	MSM (same as for Web of Spider-Man)	Marvel Comics	Starter set	June 2004	Spider-Friends; Sinister Syndicate	Spider-Friends; Sinister Syndicate	80 total, all reprints	All cards are drawn from the Web of Spider-Man expansion set, released a few months later
2	DC Origins	DOR	DC Comics	Expansion set	July 2004	Gotham Knights; Arkham Inmates; League of Assassins; Teen Titans	Gotham Knights; Arkham Inmates; League of Assassins; Teen Titans; Fearsome Five; Deathstroke	165	Boost; Loyalty; Transferable
N/A	Batman vs. the Joker Starter Set	DOR (same as for DC Origins)	DC Comics	Starter set	July 2004	Gotham Knights; Arkham Inmates	None	80 total, all reprints	All cards are drawn from the DC Origins expansion set
3	Web of Spider-Man	MSM	Marvel Comics	Expansion set	September 2004	Spider-Friends; Sinister Syndicate	Spider-Friends; Sinister Syndicate	165	Evasion
4	Superman, Man of Steel	DSM	DC Comics	Expansion set	November 2004	Team Superman; New Gods; Revenge Squad; Darkseid's Elite	Team Superman; New Gods; Revenge Squad; Darkseid's Elite	165	Cosmic; Invulnerability
5	Marvel Knights	MMK	Marvel Comics	Expansion set	February 2005	Marvel Knights; Crime Lords; Underworld; X-Statix	Marvel Knights; Crime Lords; Underworld; X-Statix	220	Concealed; Dual-Loyalty; Hidden area First reprint: Marvel Team-Up
6	Green Lantern Corps	DGL	DC Comics	Expansion set	May 2005	Green Lantern; Emerald Enemies; Anti-Matter; Manhunters	Green Lantern; Emerald Enemies; Anti-Matter; Manhunters	220	Concealed-Optional; Willpower; Non-character cards ("Construct")
N/A	Batman Starter Deck	DBM	DC Comics	Starter set	June 2005	Gotham Knights; League of Assassins	None	80 total, 28 non-reprint	Some cards are drawn from the DC Origins expansion set; others are new Released to coincide with Batman Begins, the 2005 Batman film
N/A	Fantastic Four Starter Deck	MFF	Marvel Comics	Starter set	June 2005	Fantastic Four; Doom	None	80 total, 28 non-reprint	Some cards are drawn from the Marvel Origins set; others are new released to coincide with Fantastic Four, the 2005 Fantastic Four film
7	The Avengers	MAV	Marvel Comics	Expansion set	August 2005	Avengers; Masters of Evil; Kang Council; Thunderbolts; Squadron Supreme	Avengers; Masters of Evil; Kang Council; Thunderbolts; Squadron Supreme	220	Leader; Reservist; Non-character cards ("Team-Up")
8	Justice League of America	DJL	DC Comics	Expansion set	November 2005	Justice League of America; Justice League International; Injustice Gang; Secret Society	Justice League of America; Justice League International; Injustice Gang; Rann; Secret Society	220	Ally; Dual team affiliations
9	X-Men	MXM	Marvel Comics	Expansion set	February 2006	X-Men; Brotherhood; Morlocks; Hellfire Club	Morlocks; Hellfire Club	220	Mutant Traits (Physical, Mental, and Energy)
N/A	X-Men Starter Deck	MXS	Marvel Comics	Starter set	February 2006	X-Men; Brotherhood	None	80 total, 32 non-reprint	Some cards are drawn from The X-Men expansion set; others are new released to coincide with X-Men: The Last Stand, the 2006 X-Men film
10	Infinite Crisis	DCR	DC Comics	Expansion set	April 2006	JSA; Shadowpact; Villains United; Checkmate	JSA; Shadowpact; Villains United; Checkmate; Secret Six; Crisis	220	Vengeance; Backup; Loyalty-Reveal; Identity concept expanded Non-character cards ("Magic") "Champion" characters
11	Heralds of Galactus	MHG	Marvel Comics	Expansion set	September 2006	Heralds of Galactus; Inhumans; Kree; Doom; Skrull	Heralds of Galactus; Inhumans; Kree; Infinity Watch	220	Press; Terraform; Cosmic-Surge
12	Legion of Super-Heroes	DLS	DC Comics	Expansion set	December 2006	Legionnaires; Future Foes; Teen Titans; Darkseid's Elite	Legionnaires; Future Foes	220	Substitute; Alternate use of Cosmic
13	Marvel Team-Up	MTU	Marvel Comics	Expansion set	February 2007	Spider-Friends; Sinister Syndicate; Underworld; Marvel Defenders; Wild Pack	Marvel Defenders; Wild Pack	220	Dual Loyalty; Alternate use of Boost; Paying attack or defense
N/A	Hellboy Essential Collection	EHB	Hellboy	Essential Collection	February 2007	B.P.R.D. Thule Society	B.P.R.D. Thule Society	55	First and only set not set in Marvel or DC Universe
14	World's Finest	DWF	DC Comics	Expansion set	July 2007	Team Superman; Gotham Knights; Revenge Squad; Arkham Inmates; Outsiders; Birds of Prey	Outsiders; Birds of Prey	220	Insanity
15	Marvel Legends	MVL	Marvel Comics	Expansion set	August 2007	X-Men; Brotherhood; Marvel Knights; Fantastic Four; Doom; Shi'ar	Shi'ar	273	New card layout Concealed and Concealed-Optional changed from keywords to symbols team symbols added "Legendary Character" concept Minor rule changes and clarifications Vast number of game mechanics temporarily abandoned to make the game easier for newer players
N/A	The Coming of Galactus	MCG	Marvel Comics	Giant-Size set	November 2007	Heralds of Galactus	None	42	For multiplayer play, pitting multiple players against a single player taking on the role of Galactus
16	DC Comics Legends	DCL	DC Comics	Expansion set	December 2007	JLA; Teen Titans; Injustice Gang; Secret Society; League of Assassins; Doom Patrol	Doom Patrol	273	Return of Reservist; Return of Concealed-Optional characters Return of dual affiliations Secret Society and Villains United teams combined into one team
17	Marvel Universe	MUN	Marvel Comics	Expansion set	June 2008	Avengers; Thunderbolts; S.H.I.E.L.D. Crime lords Warbound; Negative Zone; Alpha Flight; Infinity Watch	S.H.I.E.L.D. Warbound; Alpha Flight; Asgardians; Atlantis; Invaders; Nextwave; Phalanx; United Front; Nova Corps; Weapon X	330	Rally; Return of Boost (including Boost on non-character cards); Return of Leader; Return of Terraform; Return of Substitute; Return of Evasion; Return of Cosmic; Return of Invulnerability
18	Marvel Evolution	MEV	Marvel Comics	Expansion set	November 2008	X-Factor; Exiles; X-Force; Marauders; Weapon X	X-Factor; Exiles; X-Force; Marauders; Starjammers; Runaways; Purifiers	275	Shift; Energize; Hunter

== Organized Play ==
In tournament play, there are three common formats:

- Modern Age format draws a card pool from the last two released sets from both brands (i.e., the last two Marvel sets and the last two DC Comics sets).
- Silver Age format draws a card pool from the last four released sets from both brands (i.e, the last four released sets from Marvel Comics and the last four released sets from DC Comics).
- Golden Age format draws from a card pool of all legally playable cards.

Upper Deck Entertainment planned the year-round professional $1 million Organized Play Pro Circuit prior to the release of the game.

=== Notable players in UDE Organized Play ===
The following is a listing of players who have won more than one 10K event or have won a Pro Circuit event.

- William Hodack, 2004 Origins $10K Champion, June 26, 2004
- Marshall James, 2004 Philadelphia $10k Champion, July 10, 2004
- Jeremy Tucker, 2004 $10K Champion, Wizard World Chicago
- Brian Kibler, first-ever Pro Circuit Champion, Gen Con Indy, August 22, 2004
- Robert Leander, $10K Wizard World Texas Champion, November 6, 2004, $10K New Jersey Champion, January 15, 2005; first Vs. System player to win multiple $10K events
- Ryan Jones, Pro Circuit Los Angeles Champion, December 3, 2004
- Hans Joachim Höh (Hans served a 3-year ban for cheating in the top 8 of a Pro Circuit), $10K Hannover Champion, February 5, 2005, $10K Bologna Champion, February 20, 2005, $10K Bremen Champion, December 3, 2005
- Dean Sohlne, $10K London Champion, March 21, 2005, $10K Amsterdam Champion, April 9, 2005.
- Michael Jacob, $10K Chicago Champion, April 2, 2005, $10K Toronto Champion, August 27, 2005, $10K Orlando Champion, October 15, 2005
- Ian Vincent, Pro Circuit San Francisco Champion
- Trey Kelly, Pro Circuit New York Champion
- Anthony Calabrese, Pro Circuit Indianapolis 2006 Champion
- Adam Horvath, Pro Circuit Amsterdam Champion, April 7, 2005
- Adam Bernstein, Pro Circuit New York Champion, May 26, 2005
- Adam Prosak, $10K San Diego Champion, July 15, 2005, $10K Atlanta Champion, September 4, 2005 Pro Circuit Los Angeles November 17, 2006
- Kakarot Turker, $10K Sydney Champion, December 1, 2006, 6 consecutive 10K top 8s
- Darryn Ying, $10K Melbourne Champion, October 20, 2006,
- Vidianto Wijaya, Pro Circuit Atlanta Champion, March 24, 2006; as of August 13, 2006, has a record five Pro Circuit top eight finishes and has won over $100,000
- Dennis Davino, Creator of the Turn 8 Nega Bomb, 2006
- Kyle Dembinski, Pro Circuit Sydney 2007 winner
- John Hammond, $10K Indy 2007 Champion - Bring Your Own Set format
- Brian Eugenio, 1st Vs. Worlds Champion 2008
- Robert Rietze, Gen Con Indy 2008 1st Place
- Alexander Antonias, Brisbane and Adelaide 10k champion

=== Banned list ===
As with most TCGs, the ever-increasing card pool leads to more and more combinations and possibilities. While this is generally considered to be a positive factor, sometimes these combinations bring a degeneracy that is unhealthy for tournament play and the long term health of the game. When this occurs, organized play intervenes and the offending cards are usually banned. The first card to be banned was "Overload" banned because of its synergy with various attackpumps. Used in tandem, players were able to stun their opponent's board at minimal cost. UDE later released a fixed—playable but unremarkable—version of the card called System Failure, released in MAV.

Unlike most CCGs which have banned lists unique to various formats, UDE has chosen to have one universal all-encompassing banned list.

== Video game ==
A video game based on the Vs. System was released on February 27, 2007 for the PC, PSP and Nintendo DS. It was developed by Vicious Cycle Software and published by Konami. The game has been named as the Marvel Trading Card game and only includes cards from Marvel Origins and Marvel-based expansions up to the Avengers set.

== Awards ==
In 2004, Vs. System won the Gamers' Choice Award and was also nominated for Best Collectible Card Game or Expansion both from Origins Awards. In 2005 it received the Game of the Year award from InQuest Gamer.

== Reviews ==
- Pyramid
