= Marvel Trading Card Game =

2007 video game

- Developers: Vicious Cycle Software (PC/PSP); 1st Playable Productions, Engine Software (DS)
- Publisher: Konami
- Designer: Dave Ellis
- Engine: Vicious Engine
- Platforms: Nintendo DS, Windows, PlayStation Portable
- Release: PSP: NA: February 27, 2007; EU: June 8, 2007; AU: July 6, 2007; DS: NA: May 22, 2007; EU: July 25, 2007; AU: August 3, 2007; Windows: EU: June 8, 2007; NA: July 3, 2007
- Genre: Collectible card game
- Modes: Single-player, multiplayer

Marvel Trading Card Game is a video game for the Nintendo DS, Windows, and PlayStation Portable. It was developed by Vicious Cycle Software and 1st Playable Productions and published by Konami. The game is based on Upper Deck Entertainment's Marvel Comics-based collectible card game, and was released across all three platforms in several regions in 2007.

Marvel Trading Card Game is a virtual card game in which the player chooses to be either a superhero or supervillain in single-player mode. Multiplayer modes are also available. The game follows the rules laid out in Upper Deck's VS System, used in card games across several franchises including Marvel, DC Comics, and Hellboy.

The game received mixed reviews from critics. It was considered faithful to the physical version, but reviewers commented that it was not accessible to players who were not already fans of collectible card games. The handheld versions were criticized for presenting a visual format inappropriate for small screens.

== Gameplay ==
Marvel Trading Card Game is a collectible card game with similarities to other card games, like Magic: The Gathering. The game was designed to portray the VS System rules exactly the same as the physical version, created by baseball card manufacturer Upper Deck Entertainment. Players start each match with a premade deck of cards, from which they draw a number of cards to form a hand. Cards in the hand can be subsequently put into play, and each card represents a character or ability that is played against similar cards possessed by the opponent.

A screenshot from the PSP version of the game, displaying the playing field of a match.

Matches are formatted into segmented turns during which players can act. Each turn a player draws two cards to add to their hand, and cards in a hand can be put onto the playing field. The playing field is made of up individual rows where cards can be placed; there are six rows for each player. Cards are played by spending "resource points" which act as a form of energy. The more powerful a card is, the more resource points are required to play it. Resource points are gained by specifically assigning any card in the hand to a resource row, and only one card can be made into a resource each turn. More powerful cards, such as Magneto, require a higher available pool of resources and so can only be played in later turns in a match. Once put into play from the player's hand, a card can be used to provide a benefit to the player or to attack the opponent. Types of cards include characters, such as Onslaught and Namor; each character has an attack and defense rating that represents how much damage they can inflict and sustain. Other cards include locations and equipment, which can be used to boost the statistics and abilities of characters, and "plot twists" which encompass a wide range of effects, such as forcing an opponent to forfeit some of the cards in their hand. Each player has a life bar that is depleted with each successful attack by an opponent, and a player loses the match when their life bar is empty.

Whenever a card in play is activated or otherwise used, such as resources, it is referred to as "tapped" and is generally unavailable for further use until the next turn. Unlike Magic, however, characters can attack and defend in the same turn, unless they are "stunned" in combat. Damage is calculated by adding the difference between an attacking character's attack and the defending character's defense, plus the resource cost of the card. Any damage not absorbed by a defending character is applied to the player's life total. The location of a card on the playing field can affect its statistics; in order to attack, characters further away from the opponent must possess a projectile weapon or the ability to fly, for instance. Adjacent characters with a matching team affiliation within the Marvel universe can also reinforce one another's attack and defense, such as the Spider Friends and X-Men. Cards activating an ability can be countered by the opponent, and these abilities and counters combine to form a "chain" that dictates the order in which their effects are applied.

=== Single-player ===
Marvel Trading Card Game's single-player mode allows the player to choose one of two different campaigns; one for heroes and one for villains. Both campaigns are based around the Sentinels. Each campaign contains six chapters, with each chapter represented by a series of card matches. The chapters are different for heroes and villains with the exception of the final chapter. Some matches have additional requirements for victory beyond reducing an opponent's health to zero. Completing missions awards the player booster packs and virtual money that can be used to purchase additional cards in the in-game card shop.

=== Multiplayer ===
Each version of the game offers multiplayer support. The PC version allows players to play over the internet or a local area network. Players can trade cards among one another and participate in matches and tournaments, some of which were sponsored by Konami. PSP owners can play Marvel Trading Card Game with the console's local wireless "ad-hoc" mode or online against other PSP and PC players. The DS version can be used for both local- and internet-based two-player games, but is incompatible for tournament use. Cards earned in the single-player campaign cannot be used in multiplayer games, but they were available for purchase with actual money in an online store until Konami suspended the service.

== Development ==
In August 2005, video game publisher Konami acquired an exclusive license to make games based on Upper Deck's Marvel collectible card game. Konami had published previous titles based on card games, such as the Yu-Gi-Oh! series. Marvel Trading Card Game was formally announced at the Electronic Entertainment Expo (E3) video game convention in May 2006. Konami explained that the game would use Upper Deck's "VS System" rules and would be available for the DS, PSP, and PC consoles. It was to have both single-player and multiplayer modes for all three systems, and the PC and PSP versions would be cross-compatible. Konami promised that it would host online tournaments, complete with prizes. The PSP and PC versions were developed by Vicious Cycle Software, and the DS version was outsourced to New York-based designer 1st Playable Productions.

From the beginning of development, Vicious Cycle wanted players on all three consoles to be able to play against each other online. This option was ultimately not implemented for the DS. Lead designer Dave Ellis said "...development time and platform limitations didn't permit our DS developers to pursue that option, so the DS version was ultimately limited to Wi-Fi and online play with other DS players." The PSP and PC versions allow players to use the same matchmaking system, and the game's code is linked so that if one platform is patched, the other must be as well. Players with a PC can download and use the online component of the game for free.

A cutscene from the single-player campaign, depicting the X-Men Storm and Cyclops.

The plot in the single-player mode of Marvel Trading Card Game was composed by Marvel writer John Layman, and the cutscenes were drawn by comic artists like Keron Grant and Pat Olliffe. Early in the development process, the design team had considered portraying the player's avatar as a character within the game's story, but this idea was eventually discarded, and the game does not explain the player's role. The plot, which revolves around the group of robotic enemies of the X-Men known as Sentinels, was created because in real life, competitive play in the Marvel card game community was focused on Sentinel decks around the time of Marvel Trading Card Game's development. Around 300 separate decks were created by the design team for the single-player mode, and AI opponents use a more challenging deck if they are played against more than once.

The game contains over 1,100 cards, and includes cards from select expansion sets in the physical version, like the Avengers and the Fantastic Four. PC and PSP owners can download the X-Men expansion set online for free. Over four hundred characters are represented, with over a hundred as specific entries in the story mode. Artwork for cards was provided by artists such as Alex Garner and Adam Kubert. Whenever a player completes a chapter in the story mode, they are awarded a five-card booster pack. The game includes a deck editor that allows players to create and modify decks as they see fit.

Marvel Trading Card Game was released for the PSP on February 27, 2007 in North America, June 8 in Europe, and July 6 in Australia. The DS version was released on May 22 in North America, July 25 in Europe, and on August 3 in Australia. The PC version was released on June 8 in Europe and July 3 in North America, and included a limited edition.

=== Online community ===
Online matchmaking and the card store were opened in tandem with the PSP version's North American release. PC players used the same services when their version was released. The matchmaking service, the website, store, and other online features were maintained by Agora Games, a gaming company that specializes in online communities. Konami offered players sanctioned tournaments and downloadable card packs. On March 12, 2008, Konami announced that it was closing down the website's forums and the online store. Matchmaking and online play would continue to be available to the public, but all cards would be made available for free to all accounts.

As we pass our one year anniversary, Konami has decided to transition the site to a free service. All cards in all accounts will be made available, and we will continue the service as long as there is a strong desire for it from the community.

— Charles Murakami, Konami Digital Entertainment, Inc.

== Reception ==
Reception

Aggregate score
Aggregator	Score		
Aggregator	DS	PC	PSP
Metacritic	61/100		63/100

Review scores
Publication	Score		
Publication	DS	PC	PSP
GameSpot	6.5/10	6.5/10	6.5/10
GamesRadar+	6/10		6/10
GameZone	5.3/10		6.7/10
IGN	6.7/10		6.8/10
X-Play	2/5		3/5

Reception of Marvel Trading Card Game across all three platforms was mixed. The game was compared to other collectible card games such as Pokémon, Magic, and Munchkin. Reviewers were pleased with the game's representation of the VS System rules, but felt that it was less accessible to players who weren't familiar with the physical version. Several reviews referred to the gameplay as addictive; IGN''s Hilary Goldstein said "I have to admit, I am somewhat addicted to the Marvel Trading Card Game. It's not a great game by any measure, but it does an excellent job of tapping into the collector's mentality of comic-book fans."

The game's difficulty, especially the complexity of the VS System ruleset, was described as a potential barrier for gamers. PALGN said "Even though there are a handful of in-game tutorials, they aren't entirely utilised efficiently as they're basically just a big slab of text making the game less friendly towards a wider audience." GamesRadar''s Eric Bratcher said "If you aren't familiar with the source, get ready for a very steep learning curve." One X-Play reviewer commented that the game's tutorial "might go down in history as the worst in-game tutorial ever created," and another said that gamers who would be most interested in the video game would already be avid players of the physical version.

Overall, while Marvel Trading Card Game for the Nintendo DS does a reasonable job of recreating the real life game, the experience is slightly hampered by a cramped layout.

— Joseph Rositano, PALGN

On the handheld versions, many reviewers complained that Marvel Trading Card Game's layout made it difficult to play, as there wasn't enough room on the small screens for the playing field of a match. IGN referred to the presentation and visuals as "abysmal". GameSpot described the game's portrayal of plot twist chains as "an alien tax return". The text on individual cards on the PSP version was considered difficult to read, but the DS format of holding the console sideways to play was praised.

Reviewers praised the gameplay options available to players, although GameZone described the story mode as "bland" and IGN called it "too long for its own good". Multiplayer gameplay was well received. GameSpot called the multiplayer "surprisingly solid" and Pocket Gamer described the choice of online modes as "a raft of pleasing multiplayer options." IGN said of the PSP version "Though MTCG's single-player is fairly deep and enjoyable, the focus is on multiplayer ... It's only through the infrastructure online mode that you can access the aspects of MTCG that make it worth the $30 purchase."
