= Daredevil: End of Days =

Comic book miniseries

- Artwork for the cover of Daredevil: End of Days #1; Art by Alex Maleev

Publication information
- Publisher: Marvel Comics
- Schedule: Monthly
- Format: Limited series
- Genre: Superhero
- Publication date: October 2012 – June 2013
- No. of issues: 8
- Main character: Daredevil

Creative team
- Written by: Brian Michael Bendis; David W. Mack
- Artists: Klaus Janson; Alex Maleev

Daredevil: End of Days is an American comic book miniseries featuring the Marvel Comics character Daredevil, written by Brian Michael Bendis and David W. Mack, drawn by Klaus Janson, inked by Bill Sienkiewicz and with covers by Alex Maleev. Mack, Sienkiewicz and Maleev also contribute occasional interiors and splash pages throughout the series. It concerns the death of Daredevil, not unlike previous "Marvel: The End" miniseries, which told the final stories of other Marvel Comics characters.

== Publication history ==
According to Bendis, "It goes a little further than most of The End stories. And we make it canon. This is in continuity; not too dissimilar to how Dark Knight Returns became continuity through sheer force of will. So we put it out there and everybody jumped."

The series finds the future as a violent and dark underworld. According to Bendis, the first two issues (out of an originally planned six) will be double-sized. Nearly all of Daredevil's rogues gallery, his surviving past loves, and various other Marvel heroes will make appearances.

Bendis mentioned in an interview, 'The project that never ends,' implying work is still being done on the project. In addition, at Comicpalooza 2011 in Houston, TX, David Mack also affirmed that work was still being done on the series.

Following in June 2011, in a press release that announced Daredevil would be joining the New Avengers, Marvel also announced that the long-awaited Daredevil: End of Days series would see print in Fall 2011.

On July 9, 2012, Marvel announced in a press release that the first issue of the series would ship in October 2012.

The premier issue sold 40,911 copies with sales dropping to 26,239 by the final issue.

== Plot ==
In a final battle with Bullseye, Daredevil's last word before his death was "Mapone". Ben Urich, covering the story for the soon-to-be-defunct Daily Bugle, sets out to unravel Matt Murdock's one remaining secret: Mapone. It is revealed that, several years before his death, Matt Murdock's role as Daredevil took a considerably darker turn for the worse. Wilson Fisk, the former Kingpin of Crime, returned to New York City from exile in another country after brokering a deal with the federal government. Daredevil approached Fisk at a restaurant and demanded he leave immediately, saying that while he made a deal with the government, he made no such deal with him. When Fisk refuses, a violent fight ensues in which Murdock gains the upper hand and kills Fisk, telling onlookers that he had exhausted all other options in dealing with him.

Urich begins his investigation by attempting to track down one of Murdock's former lovers, the spy turned Avenger Natasha Romanova, better known as the Black Widow. He begins by asking at a bar that Natasha once fought in, and while the bartender is of no help to him, he receives a written message telling him to go around back. He does so and is greeted by none other than superspy Nick Fury who tells him that Natasha has been dead for several years. Urich asks Fury if he knows what "Mapone" means, but he claims that he doesn't. Urich presses Fury for more information, but Fury quickly vanishes without a trace.

Next, Urich is assigned to cover Murdock's funeral, but instead of doing so, he decides to tail a car leaving the funeral. The car stops at a children's soccer game, where the driver is revealed to be Murdock's former lover Elektra Natchios, an ex-assassin now trying to live a normal, stable life with her son (of whom Murdock is the father). He asks her if she knows what "Mapone" means, but she also claims to have no idea. She threatens to kill Urich if he ever goes after her again.

Urich meets with Mary Walker-Stamos, a former enemy of Daredevil better known as Typhoid Mary; she is currently a successful television actress in control of her mental state. She says that she does not know what "Mapone" means and that she wants Urich to leave her alone. She also has twin sons who are strongly implied to be Murdock's. Urich next contacts another of Murdock's former lovers, Maya Lopez, the former superhero known as Echo who is now a college professor. She too claims not to know the significance of Murdock's last words.

Urich is next alerted of Bullseye's death and visits the crime scene; Bullseye wrote the word "Mapone" in his own blood on the wall. While it initially appears that Bullseye was murdered, Urich quickly deduces that the death was actually a suicide as Bullseye caused the bullet he fired to ricochet around the room before hitting him in the head.

Urich next visits Frank Castle, the notorious vigilante better known as the Punisher who is currently incarcerated at Ryker's Island Maximum Security Prison. He asks Castle if he knows what "Mapone" means, and he replies that it meant that Murdock had dirt on Bullseye; what it means specifically, Castle refuses to say. The Punisher uses this opportunity to escape custody.

Urich visits the supervillain Bushwacker, currently in critical condition at the hospital. Before he can get anything out of him, however, the supervillain Bullet comes barging in intending to kill Bushwacker; in his rampage, he throws Urich out the window. Before Urich can fall to his death, a figure dressed as Daredevil rescues him before returning to kill Bullet.

Urich awakens in the hospital with his adopted son Tim Lange at his side. It is here revealed that years ago, Tim was the son of a criminal whom Daredevil was trying to apprehend; the man brutally beat Daredevil as Tim tearfully begged him to stop. To save Daredevil, Tim was forced to electrocute his father to death, after which Murdock comforted him and brought him to Urich, knowing that he would be a good father to him. Urich tells his son that what Murdock did for them is a true example of what a hero does.

Urich next meets with Leland Owlsley, a former enemy of Daredevil known as the Owl who has now returned to his previous position as a stock investor. Owlsley is far from reformed, however, as he is shown to possess the mask Murdock was wearing when he died in a glass box as a trophy; he threatens to kill Urich if he comes back. Urich is next contacted by another of Murdock's former enemies, Zebediah Killgrave, better known as the Purple Man. Walking into the meeting, however, Urich sees that the Purple Man has recently been shot dead by the Punisher who quickly departs. It is also revealed that the Punisher killed Owlsley earlier that same day (most likely moments after his meeting with Urich).

Urich next visits the Church of the Hand in search of answers, but he quickly becomes a target once he mentions "Mapone". He is targeted by the Hand's ninjas before being rescued by the new Daredevil, who seems to be apprehensive of taking part in such a major fight. He receives aid in the form of the Punisher, who eliminates a large number of the Hand alongside "Daredevil" before once again vanishing. "Daredevil" goes over to relieve Urich, but it is shown that he was killed by stray Hand arrows. "Daredevil" unmasks, revealing himself to be Urich's son Tim.

It is revealed that at some point Murdock began training Tim to be his successor, teaching him how to fight as well as instilling in him the values he learned from various figures over the years. Murdock told him that the spirit of his own mentor, Stick, has been reincarnated into the world and will come to serve as Tim's mentor in time. After Urich's funeral, Tim takes out his frustrations in his private gym before being visited by the Punisher who explains that "Mapone" was a source of guilt for Murdock. Tim asks Castle if perhaps he is the reincarnation of Stick meant to serve as his mentor, but he has no idea what Tim is talking about. Before leaving, he warns Tim not to go down the wrong path or else he will kill him.

Tim next settles down for a drink at a bar, joined by Peter Parker, whom he previously met at his father's funeral. Parker leaves abruptly (his Spider-Sense had gone off) and Tim is given a written message to go around back where he is met by Nick Fury. Fury expresses his sympathies over Urich's death and offers Tim a file detailing what or who "Mapone" is. Tim rejects him, tossing the file into a nearby fire and returns to the bar.

Back at the bar, a young, red-haired woman is accused of hustling the men she has been beating at games of pool; the accusations quickly turn violent with Tim interfering. While Tim holds his own, the woman is shown to have beaten most of the men down before taking off her glasses, revealing herself to be blind; she claims that her mother told her that her blindness was the only thing her father ever gave her. She introduces herself to Tim as Mapone Romanova, the daughter of Matt Murdock and Natasha Romanova. The story ends with Mapone telling Tim that most people simply call her "Stick".
