= Kings in Disguise =

1998 comic book limited series

- Cover of Kings in Disguise #1 (Mar. 1988). Art by Steve Rude.

Publication information
- Publisher: Kitchen Sink Press
- Genre: fiction
- Publication date: March–August 1988
- No. of issues: 6
- Main character(s): Freddie Bloch; Sam (the "King of Spain")

Creative team
- Created by: Jim Vance
- Written by: Jim Vance
- Artist: Dan Burr

Collected editions
- Kings in Disguise: ISBN 0-393-32848-1

Kings in Disguise is a six-issue comic book limited series, published in 1988 by Kitchen Sink Press. It was created by writer Jim Vance and artist Dan Burr. Kings in Disguise is a multiple Harvey and Eisner awards winner, and is considered one of the hundred best comic book stories of all time. It has been hailed by Alan Moore, Will Eisner, Harvey Kurtzman and Art Spiegelman.

Set during the Great Depression, the story follows 13-year-old Freddie Bloch, a Jewish boy from the fictional town of Marian, California. When his father and brother are taken from him, Freddie takes to the rails as a hobo. He soon meets Sammy ("the King of Spain"), a sickly older hobo who takes Freddie under his wing. Together, they travel through scarred-riddled America, searching for Freddie's father. Among other places, their travels take them through Detroit during a period of labor revolt.

== Publication history ==
Kings in Disguise started out as James Vance's idea for a play called On the Ropes. One of the central characters of On the Ropes was an 18-year-old communist activist named Freddie Bloch, whose background stated that he participated in the Ford Plant Strike of 1936.

James Vance was friends with several people at Kitchen Sink Press, who suggested adapting the play as a graphic novel. Rather than adapt the play directly, Vance countered with an offer to produce a six issue mini-series Kings In Disguise that was a prequel to On the Ropes. He worked with Dan Burr to create the six-issue limited series published by Kitchen Sink from 1988 to 1989.

Though not a big seller, Kings In Disguise proved popular within the indie comic scene and James Vance was asked by Dark Horse Comics to produce further stories involving the characters from the mini-series. Dark Horse Presents #42 featured an interlude story that takes place between issues #2 and #3 of the mini-series.

Kings in Disguise was issued in trade paperback by Kitchen Sink in 1990 with the Dark Horse Presents interlude inserted into the original story. It was re-issued by W. W. Norton with an introduction by Alan Moore in 2006. It was translated into Italian in 1991 by Granata Press, and again in 2006 by Saldapress. The French publisher Vertige Graphic released a French edition in 2003.

The sequel On the Ropes was published in 2013. On the Ropes has been positively reviewed by, among others, the Los Angeles Times, Publishers Weekly.

== Plot ==
Freddie Bloch is a young 13-year-old boy in 1933 California, whose life falls apart when his single father abandons the family and his older brother is arrested for robbing a local store to provide for the two. Believing his father may have gone to Detroit to get work in the auto industry, Freddie becomes a hobo but quickly becomes aware of the dangerous life of traveling the rails when a group of hobos try to rob and sexually assault him. Freddie is saved by another hobo named Sam, who states he is the "King of Spain" traveling in disguise in the United States. Sam and Freddie become friends, traveling their way to Michigan to locate Freddie's father.

When they reach Flint, Michigan, the Ford plant has been shut down, and striking workers and local communist organizers begin protesting the plant closure. Freddie and Sam befriend a local minister, who provides food and shelter to the homeless in Flint. However, the minister withholds food and resources (such as a place to sleep in his church) from those who refuse to attend the religious services as Freddie and Sam discover that the minister is suffering from a crisis in faith due to the rise of "godless communism" among the out-of-work homeless auto workers. They also befriend the leaders of the local communist cell, a married couple named John and Marie, who are organizing the local auto workers' protests but who remain naïve in their belief that Ford won't use violence against the protesters. When a major protest goes sideways due to the police using violence against the protesters, Sam is mortally wounded as Freddie becomes distracted and separated from him when he falsely believes he has spotted his father in the crowd. They are rescued by a rather nasty, cruel homeless man named "Snake" and his traveling companion, a young girl who has a crush on Freddie. As Snake and the local minister help Sam recover from his injuries, Snake reveals to Sam that he too used to be a preacher until he lost his faith. However, with help from the young girl he rescued from a cruel pimp, he has started to regain some of his faith in God as he convinces Sam that Freddie deserves better than the hobo life. Sam, once recovered, learns that Freddie wishes to stay in Flint and help John and Marie in their communist activities. Freddie also reveals to Sam that his father was an abusive drunkard and that during their time traveling together, Freddie now comes to consider Sam to be his "true father." Sam ultimately leaves Flint, with Freddie's narration stating that he never saw his friend again.

== Awards ==
- 1989 Eisner Award Best Single Issue/Story — Kings in Disguise #1
- 1989 Eisner Award Best New Series
- 1989 Harvey Award Best New Series

== Sources consulted ==
=== References ===
- Vance, James (2006). Kings in Disguise. Dan Burr, ill. New York: W.W. Norton. ISBN 0-393-32848-1. OCLC 62697235.
