= Batman: The Cult =

1988 DC Comics miniseries

- Cover of Batman: The Cult #1, art by Bernie Wrightson.

Publication information
- Publisher: DC Comics
- Format: Miniseries
- Genre: Superhero
- Publication date: August - November 1988
- No. of issues: 4
- Main character(s): Batman; Deacon Blackfire; Robin; Jim Gordon

Creative team
- Written by: Jim Starlin
- Artist: Bernie Wrightson
- Letterer: John Costanza
- Colorist: Bill Wray
- Editor(s): Denny O'Neil; Dan Raspler

Collected editions
- Batman: The Cult: ISBN 0-930289-85-4

Batman: The Cult is an American four-issue comic book miniseries. It was published by the comic book publishing company DC Comics in their Prestige Format and released in 1988. It was written by Jim Starlin, illustrated by Bernie Wrightson, colored by Bill Wray and edited by Denny O'Neil.

== Plot ==
The story follows the machinations of Deacon Blackfire and his cult of homeless followers, who have kidnapped Batman before the events of this story. Following a lengthy period of captivity and torture, Batman succumbs to brainwashing and undergoes hallucinations of killing people. Deacon Blackfire, worshipped by his forces as an immortal saint, intends to gain the public favor by having his homeless individuals kill criminals to stop corruption as the will of God. Batman is eventually freed from the cult but takes a long time to recover from his treatment at their hands. While going back to Blackfire's hideout in the sewers, Batman realizes he has gained followers due to using drugs and psychological manipulation. Batman is found by the second Robin, Jason Todd. Meanwhile, Gotham City politicians are assassinated by Blackfire's cult. While attempting to escape, Batman and Robin are attacked by Blackfire's men. Batman is paralyzed with fear, but overcomes it to save Robin. An attempt on Commissioner Gordon's life is made by Blackfire, leaving him hospitalized. Beyond Gotham, the authorities try to protect the city, then the National Guard is called in, then the military, and finally martial law is declared. After being taken back to Wayne Manor by Alfred, Bruce trains and heals from his trauma by remembering that he became Batman to not only avenge his parents' deaths, but to overcome his fears. Batman launches an attack on the cult alongside Robin and confronts Blackfire in combat, brutally beating him to the point where the preacher begs for mercy in front of his spectating followers. The homeless turn on Blackfire for this display of cowardice and kill him. The cult disbands and order soon returns to Gotham, with Batman burning the totem that Blackfire used to hypnotize his followers.

== Collected editions ==
The miniseries was later collected in 1991 as a trade paperback graphic novel (ISBN 0-930289-85-4). This collected volume went to four printings. A new edition (the fifth printing) was released in November 2009. A deluxe edition was also released in October 2024.

== Reception ==
Hilary Goldstein of IGN called the miniseries "one of the best Batman stories ever told", praising its dark tone and storytelling. Goldstein also regarded the miniseries as one of Jason Todd's best portrayals.

Kyle Lemmon of Under the Radar described the storyline as "one of the most underappreciated Batman stories" and commended the miniseries's darker and more realistic storytelling with "nary a shred of civility".

Charles Prefore of Screen Rant lauded the miniseries' artwork, dark tone, and depiction of cults, writing, "this is possibly one of the greatest Batman stories of all time and deserves to remember as such".

== In other media ==
- Along with The Dark Knight Returns, "Batman: Knightfall", and "Batman: No Man's Land", Batman: The Cult miniseries served as an influence for Christopher Nolan's 2012 film The Dark Knight Rises. Instead of Deacon Blackfire, Bane and the League of Shadows come to Gotham and use the sewers as a hideout, with the same agenda of destroying the city for its corruption. They begin by hiring homeless people to do various work in furnishing a section of the sewer and Batman's experiences in "the pit" is similar to what he experiences in Blackfire's lair in the sewer. After being captured by Bane's men, Bruce Wayne spends the next few months inside the underground prison and begins hearing legends of Bane's early life from other inmates, and the scene where Bruce hallucinates Ra's al Ghul's return is similar to Blackfire's confrontation with Batman during his imprisonment. In both scenes, Ra's al Ghul and Blackfire express their disappointments in Bruce/Batman for failing to save Gotham. Due to Batman's absence, Bane takes control of Gotham by destroying the bridges and using debris to barricade the tunnels to trap the citizens inside and, similar to Blackfire's actions, Bane encourages the citizens to overthrow the wealthy, leading to violence in the streets.
- Deacon Blackfire and his cult make their debut in adapted media in Batman: Arkham Knight, voiced by Marc Worden. Blackfire is the villain behind the "Lamb to the Slaughter" side quest. He tries to sacrifice Jack Ryder for investigating Blackfire's cult. Batman fights the cultists to get to Ryder. After the cultists are defeated, Batman disables the electrical generators powering the sacrificial cage, defeats Blackfire, and frees Ryder.
