= World's Finest =

World's Finest may refer to:

== Comics ==
- World's Finest Comics, an American comic book series 1941–1986
  - World's Finest Team, a superhero team
- Worlds' Finest, a reimagining of the classic title, launched in 2012
- World's Finest (film), a short film
- "World's Finest" (Superman: The Animated Series), an episode of the TV series
- "Worlds Finest", an episode of the TV series Supergirl

== Other uses ==
- World's Finest Chocolate, an American chocolate company
