= Deacon Blackfire =

- Deacon Blackfire as depicted in Batman: The Cult #1. Art by Bernie Wrightson.

Publication information
- Publisher: DC Comics
- First appearance: Batman: The Cult #1 (August 1988)
- Created by: Jim Starlin (writer); Bernie Wrightson (artist)

In-story information
- Full name: Deacon Joseph Alexander Blackfire
- Species: Human
- Place of origin: Earth
- Team affiliations: The Underworlders; Black Lantern Corps
- Notable aliases: Shaman Blackfire, the Holy One
- Abilities: Charlatan skilled in manipulation and mind control; Extended lifespan; Magic

Deacon Joseph Blackfire is a supervillain appearing in American comic books published by DC Comics. Blackfire is stated as being over 134 years old, and is often portrayed as a power-crazed charismatic con artist and cult leader skilled in manipulation and brainwashing. Blackfire claimed to be a Native American shaman who was entombed alive after being found guilty of killing a tribal chief and committing heresy.

== Publication history ==
He first appeared in Batman: The Cult #1 (1988) and was created by Jim Starlin and Bernie Wrightson.

== Fictional character biography ==
Deacon Joseph Blackfire is the main antagonist in the four-issue miniseries Batman: The Cult, where he is introduced as a con man and cult leader who may be over 100 years old. He forms an army in the sewers beneath Gotham City, largely composed of the homeless. Blackfire orchestrates a violent war on crime, which escalates into him taking over Gotham. Blackfire captures and brainwashes Batman into joining his cult before Batman breaks free of his conditioning. Batman confronts Blackfire and beats him in front of his army. Blackfire's army turns on him and rips him to shreds.

In the Blackest Night event, Blackfire's corpse is reanimated by a black power ring and recruited to the Black Lantern Corps.

In The New 52 reboot, Deacon Blackfire is an evangelist who is the center of the occult power permeating Arkham Asylum, with Duela Dent as his enforcer. When Batwing and Jim Corrigan uncover the secret of the asylum, both are captured by Blackfire and his demonic army. Batman is able to break the pipe that he is chained to, and in a reversal of their confrontation in Batman: The Cult, orders Blackfire to kill him to prove himself in front of his followers. Blackfire refuses multiple times, and his disillusioned army turns on him and beats him to death.

Between his death and the time of Batman Eternal, Blackfire has taken over the body of Maxie Zeus, in attempt to regain entry into the mortal world. He attempts to remove the Spectre from his host, Jim Corrigan, to gain his power, only for the Spectre to overpower Blackfire and remove him from Zeus' body. Blackfire returns in DC Rebirth, where he attempts to possess his only remaining blood relative as a means of resurrection. However, he is defeated by Batman and forced to return to Hell.

== Powers and abilities ==
Deacon Blackfire has an extended lifespan and - allegedly - mind-control abilities.

== In other media ==
Deacon Blackfire appears in Batman: Arkham Knight, voiced by Marc Worden.
