= James Vance (comics) =

American comic book writer, author and playwright (1953 – 2017)

- Born: April 2, 1953 Muskogee, Oklahoma, U.S.
- Died: June 5, 2017 (aged 64) Tulsa, Oklahoma, U.S.
- Area: Writer
- Notable works: Kings in Disguise; On the Ropes
- Collaborators: Dan Burr
- Awards: Harvey Award, 1989; Eisner Award, 1989

James Vance (April 2, 1953 – June 5, 2017) was an American comic book writer, author and playwright, best known for his work from Kitchen Sink Press and in particular the lauded Kings in Disguise.

== Biography ==
Vance's introduction into comics writing came in 1988, with his Kitchen Sink-published limited series, Kings in Disguise, later collected by W. W. Norton, with an introduction by Alan Moore, who calls it:

"One of the most moving and compelling human stories to emerge out of the graphic story medium."

This work, with art by Dan Burr, earned both a Harvey Award and an Eisner Award (both 1989) for best new series, as well as another Eisner Award for Best Single Issue (also 1989). It also made the list of the one hundred best graphic novels of all time.

In 2013, Vance and Burr published On the Ropes, the sequel to Kings in Disguise. On the Ropes was positively reviewed by, among others, the Los Angeles Times, Publishers Weekly.

Vance wrote Neil Gaiman's Mr. Hero the Newmatic Man for Tekno Comix in the mid-1990s, and was co-editor of Alan Moore and Melinda Gebbie's Lost Girls as originally serialised by Kitchen Sink Press. He contributed comic scripts for The Crow, Aliens and Predator.

Vance was married to cartoonist Kate Worley for the last ten years of her life before she succumbed to cancer in 2004. After Worley's death, Vance edited and completed (with artist Reed Waller) the final chapters of her Omaha the Cat Dancer strip, which were serialized in Sizzle magazine. He died on June 5, 2017, from cancer.

== Bibliography ==
Comics work includes:

- Kings in Disguise (Kitchen Sink Press, 1988) — with artist Dan Burr
- Mr. Hero the Newmatic Man (Tekno Comix, 1995)
- Batman: Legends of the Dark Knight: Idols #80–82 (DC Comics, 1996) — with artists Dougie Braithwaite and Sean Hardy
- Aliens: Survival (Dark Horse, 1998)
- Predator: Homeworld (Dark Horse, 1999)
- Omaha the Cat Dancer in Sizzle #28–30, 32, 34–35, 38–40, 42–44, 46–49, 51, 53, 55, 56 (Eurotica, NBM Publishing, 2005–2012) — with artist Reed Waller
- On the Ropes (W. W. Norton, 2013) — with artist Dan Burr

== Awards and nominations ==
In addition to his 1989 Eisner and Harvey Awards wins (with Dan Burr), Vance was also a 1990 Eisner-nominee with Burr for Kings in Disguise, and a 1991-nominee as best writer.
