= Shaloman =

Jewish superhero

Publication information
- Publisher: Mark 1 Comics
- First appearance: Shaloman #1 (1988)
- Created by: Al Wiesner

In-story information
- Alter ego: None (inanimate rock)
- Abilities: invulnerability, super strength, hearing, senses, and "Sensor Vision"

Shaloman is a Jewish superhero with powers similar to Superman. Known as "The Man of Stone," "Defender of the Downtrodden," and the "Kosher Crusader," Shaloman was created by Al Wiesner.

== Publication history ==
Shaloman was created by Wiesner in 1985 because he believed there were few Jewish heroes serving as positive role models. Wiesner drew inspiration from the creation of Superman by Jerry Siegel and Joseph Shuster, both of whom were Jewish. Although Wiesner was an admirer of Siegel and Shuster's work on Superman, he commented that the ethnicity of the character was rarely brought up and that many fans assumed Superman was a WASP. The last Shaloman comic was printed in 2012.

== Fictional history ==
Three wise men used magic to give a rock (shaped like a Shin after being struck by lightning) the power to become Shaloman and stop the evils of the world. They named him "Shaloman," because shalom means "peace" in Hebrew.

== Powers ==
Shaloman is normally an inanimate rock, until someone cries out the words of help "Oy vey!" These words transform the rock into a muscular, curly-haired man.

In human form, Shaloman has superhuman strength, an unspecified degree of invulnerability and does not need to breathe. He can fly and is so fast he can create vortices. He has super hearing (he is able to distinguish different sounds even if he is above the atmosphere of the Earth) and "sensor vision" (a kind of telescopic vision). In one story he has telepathy. In Shaloman Vol.1, #3, a substance called "She-nite" can weaken him.
