= Bill Sienkiewicz =

American comic book artist (born 1958)

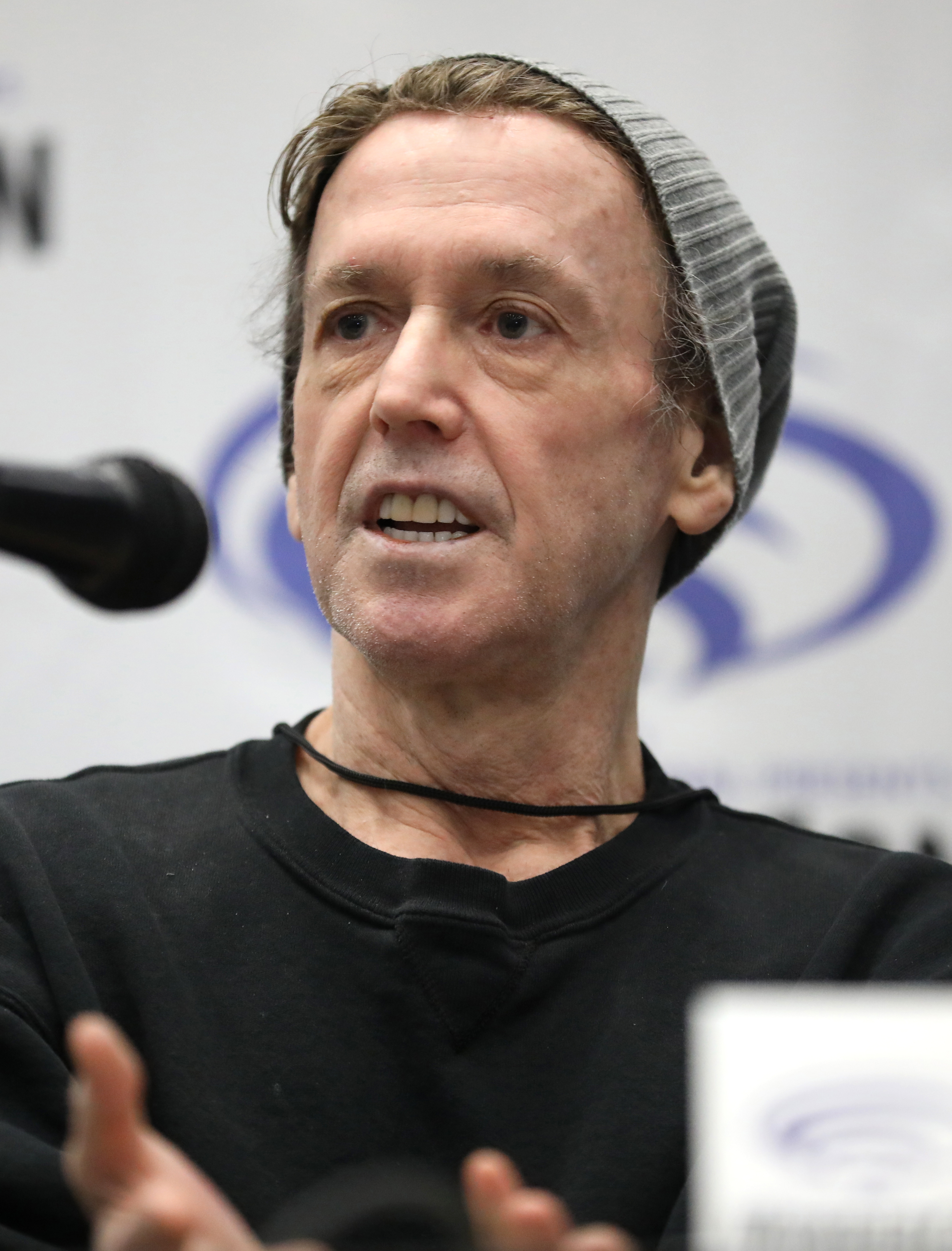
- Bill Sienkiewicz speaking at the 2024 WonderCon
- Born: Boleslav William Felix Robert Sienkiewicz; May 3, 1958 (age 68) Blakely, Pennsylvania, U.S.
- Areas: Writer, Penciller, Inker
- Notable works: Elektra: Assassin; Moon Knight; The New Mutants; Stray Toasters
- Awards: Full list

Boleslav William Felix Robert Sienkiewicz (/sɪnˈkɛvɪtʃ/ sin-KEV-itch or /sɪŋˈkɛvɪtʃ/ sing-KEV-itch; Polish: [ɕɛnˈkʲɛvit͡ʂ]; born May 3, 1958) is an American artist known for his work in comic books—particularly for Marvel Comics' The New Mutants, Moon Knight, and Elektra: Assassin. He is the co-creator of the character David Haller / Legion, the basis for the FX television series Legion.

Sienkiewicz's work in the 1980s was considered revolutionary in mainstream US comics due to his highly stylized art that verged on abstraction and made use of oil painting, photorealism, collage, mimeograph, and other forms generally uncommon in comic books.

== Early life ==
Sienkiewicz was born May 3, 1958, in Blakely, Pennsylvania. When he was five years old, he moved with his family to the Hainesville section of Sandyston Township, New Jersey, where he attended elementary and secondary school. Sienkiewicz began drawing "when [he] was about four or five", and continued doing and learning about art throughout his childhood. His early comic book influences include artist Curt Swan Superman comics, and artist Jack Kirby's Fantastic Four.

Sienkiewicz received his classical art education at the Newark School of Fine and Industrial Art in Newark, New Jersey.

After art school, he showed a portfolio of his work to DC Comics' art director Vince Colletta, which led to his entering the comics field at age 19. The artist recalled in 1985, "They didn't have any work for me, but that didn't bother me. I just figured that if comics didn't work out I'd have done advertising or illustration. Vinnie called [renowned comics and advertising artist] Neal Adams, who put me in touch with [Marvel Comics editor-in-chief] Jim Shooter. Soon after that I was drawing Moon Knight, in The Hulk [black-and-white comics] magazine". His early art style was heavily influenced by Neal Adams.

He is a descendant of the Polish writer Henryk Sienkiewicz.

== Career ==
=== Comics ===
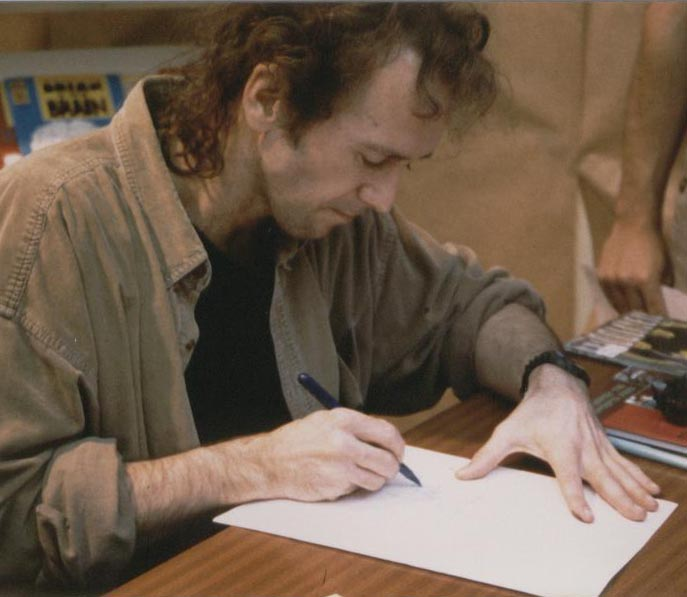
Sienkiewicz, during a 1997 appearance in Gijón, Spain

Sienkiewicz continued as the artist of the Moon Knight color comics series, starting with the first issue (November 1980). His eclectic art style helped shed the early perception of Moon Knight as a mere Batman clone. Four years later, after a stint as artist on Fantastic Four, he became the artist on Marvel's The Uncanny X-Men spin-off The New Mutants, beginning with issue No. 18 (August 1984), producing cover paintings and character designs. From this period on, Sienkiewicz's art evolved into a much more expressionistic style, and he began experimenting with paint, collage, and mixed media. He illustrated The New Mutants from 1984 to 1985.

Sienkiewicz produced covers for a range of Marvel titles, including Rom, Dazzler, The Mighty Thor, Return of the Jedi and The Transformers, and drew the comic adaptation of Dune.

Sienkiewicz's own first writing credit was for the painted story "Slow Dancer" in Epic Illustrated in 1986. Sienkiewicz both wrote and illustrated the 1988 miniseries Stray Toasters, an idiosyncratic work published by Epic Comics about a criminal psychologist investigating a series of murders. His first major interior work for DC Comics was contributing to Batman #400 (October 1986).

He illustrated the 1986-87 eight-issue Elektra: Assassin limited series and the Daredevil: Love and War graphic novel which were both written by Frank Miller.

After this, he collaborated with writer Andy Helfer on the first six issues of DC Comics' The Shadow series.

In 1988, he contributed to the Brought to Light graphic novel with writer Alan Moore. In 1990, Sienkiewicz and Moore published the first two issues of the uncompleted series Big Numbers. Sienkiewicz painted the Classics Illustrated adaptation of the novel Moby-Dick.

Sienkiewicz was the subject of a 2008 full-length documentary/interview produced by Woodcrest Productions, The Creator Chronicles: Bill Sienkiewicz.

In 2007, Sienkiewicz penciled 30 Days of Night: Beyond Barrow. In 2008, Sienkiewicz illustrated a story for The Nightmare Factory - Volume 2 graphic novel. That same year, he inked the Reign in Hell limited series for DC. Between 2010 and 2012, he inked several issues of Neal Adams' Batman: Odyssey project for DC Comics.

In October 2012, Sienkiewicz teamed with fellow artists Klaus Janson and David W. Mack on the eight-issue Marvel mini-series Daredevil: End of Days. Regarding the contrast in art styles, Sienkiewicz related that it was deliberate, in order to "give a very definite break from the "everyday reality" that Klaus' art is meant to portray, as well as the impression of a flashback."

In June 2014, Sienkiewicz was the guest of honor at ceremony for the 2014 Inkwell Awards at HeroesCon in Charlotte, North Carolina.

In April 2022, Sienkiewicz was reported among the more than three dozen comics creators who contributed to Operation USA's benefit anthology book, Comics for Ukraine: Sunflower Seeds, a project spearheaded by IDW Publishing Special Projects Editor Scott Dunbier, whose profits would be donated to relief efforts for Ukrainian refugees resulting from the February 2022 Russian invasion of Ukraine. Sienkiewicz would provide one of the covers to the softcover edition of the book.

=== Other work ===
In addition to his work in comics, Sienkiewicz has also worked in numerous other media, especially in the music and trading card industries. His artwork has been published in magazines including Entertainment Weekly and Spin. In 1998, he collaborated with writer Martin I. Green to produce the children's book Santa, My Life & Times.

In 1989, Sienkiewicz painted the art for the Friendly Dictators card set published by Eclipse Comics which portrayed various foreign leaders such as Mobutu Sese Seko, Ferdinand Marcos, and Anastasio Somoza Debayle. This card set was followed by Coup d'etat: The Assassination of John F. Kennedy (1990), a 36-card set including his meticulously detailed and stylized imagery of Kennedy, Lee Harvey Oswald, and Marilyn Monroe.

Sienkiewicz has illustrated cards for the Magic: The Gathering collectible card game. In 2004, Sienkiewicz contributed to card art for VS System, a collectible card game published by Upper Deck Entertainment. In 1995, he illustrated Voodoo Child: The Illustrated Legend of Jimi Hendrix the biography of Jimi Hendrix by Martin I. Green. In 1996, he provided the artwork for the Bruce Cockburn album The Charity of Night. Additional Sienkiewicz album covers include RZA's Bobby Digital in Stereo (1998), EPMD's Business as Usual (1990), and Kid Cudi's Man on the Moon: The End of Day (2009). Also in 2006, Sienkiewicz teamed with Neal Adams to create art for former Pink Floyd bassist Roger Waters.

Sienkiewicz has worked on character design for animation. His work on the television series Where on Earth Is Carmen Sandiego? received two Emmy Award nominations in 1995 and 1996. In 2006, Sienkiewicz designed the layout and art for The Venture Bros. season one DVD set; he later designed the cover art for the season three DVD and Blu-ray sets.

== Awards ==
- 1981: Eagle Award for Best New Artist
- 1981: Inkpot Award
- 1982: Eagle Award for Best Artist
- 1983: Eagle Award for Best Artist
- 1986: Yellow Kid Award, Lucca, Italy, for "bridging the gap between American and European artistic sensibilities"
- 1986: Gran Guinigi Award, Lucca, Italy
- 1987: Eagle Award for Favourite Artist (penciller)
- 1987: Kirby Award for Best Artist (for Elektra: Assassin)
- 1988: March of Dimes Award, for charity work
- 1989: Haxtur Award for Best Cover (for Question #10)
- 1991: Alpe d'Huez Award, Grenoble, France
- 1992: Adamson Award, for Daredevil, and graphic experiments
- 2004: Eisner Award for Best Anthology (for contributions to The Sandman: Endless Nights)
- 2014: Inkwell Awards Guest of Honor, 2014 Awards Ceremony
- 2019: Eisner Award for Best Archival Collection/Project—Comic Books for Bill Sienkiewicz's Mutants and Moon Knights… And Assassins... Artifact Edition

== Personal life ==
In October 1979 Sienkiewicz married Francis Ann "Franki" Dawson, who worked at Marvel as the administrative assistant for editor-in-chief Jim Shooter and later was Marvel's Administrative Manager of International Licensing. They divorced in 1983.

== Bibliography ==
Sienkiewicz's front and back covers for Stray Toasters #3

=== Interior art ===
==== DC Comics ====
- Action Comics #800 (2003)
- Astro City: A Visitor's Guide (pin-up) (2004)
- The Adventures of Superman #595 (2001)
- Aquaman vol. 4 #52 (inker, over Jim Aparo) (1999)
- Batman #400, 533–534 (inker, over Jim Aparo), 568 (inker, over Dan Jurgens) (1986, 1996)
- Batman 80-Page Giant #3 (2000)
- Batman 80-Page Giant 2011 #1 (inker, over Cristina Coronas) (2011)
- Batman: Arkham Asylum - Tales of Madness (1998) (inks over Dave Taylor)
- Batman and Robin: The Official Comic Adaptation #1 (inker, over Rodolfo Damaggio) (1997)
- Batman Black and White #3 (1996)
- The Batman Chronicles #1 (inker, over Lee Weeks), 3 (inker, over Brian Stelfreeze), 10, 12 (inker, over Rick Burchett), 15 (inker, over Joe Staton), 17 (inker, over Graham Nolan) (1995–1999)
- Batman: Dark Knight Dynasty GN (inker, over Scott McDaniel) (1998)
- Batman: Death of Innocents #1 (inker, over Joe Staton) (1996)
- Batman: GCPD #1–4 (inker, over Jim Aparo) (1996)
- Batman: Gotham Knights #33 (inker, over Mike Collins) (2002)
- Batman: Huntress & Spoiler #1 (inker, over Eduardo Barreto) (1998)
- Batman: Odyssey #6 (inker, over Neal Adams) (2011)
- Batman: Odyssey vol. 2 #1–5 (inker, over Neal Adams) (2011–2012)
- Batman: Shadow of the Bat #88 (inker, over Dan Jurgens), 93 (inker, over Paul Ryan) (1999–2000)
- Batman Villains Secret Files and Origins #1 (inker, over Jim Balent) (1998)
- Bat-Thing #1 (inker, over Rodolfo Damaggio) (1997)
- Before Watchmen: Nite Owl #3–4 (inker, over Andy Kubert) (2012–2013)
- Birds of Prey #22 (inker, over Jackson Guice) (2000)
- Bizarro #1 (one page only) (2015)
- Black Lightning/Hong Kong Phooey Special (inker, over Denys Cowan) (2018)
- Black Racer and Shilo Norman Special (inker, over Denys Cowan) (2017)
- Convergence Detective Comics #1–2 (inker, over Denys Cowan) (2015)
- Dark Nights: Death Metal Infinite Hour Exxxtreme (inker, over Denys Cowan) (2020)
- DC 1st: Batgirl/The Joker #1 (2002)
- DCU Holiday Bash #3 (inker, over Joe Staton) (1999)
- DC Universe: Legacies #9 (2011)
- Deathstroke vol. 4 #11, Annual #1 (inker, over Denys Cowan) (2017, 2018)
- Detective Comics #708–710 (inker, over Graham Nolan), 735 (inker, over Dan Jurgens), 1027 (inker, over Emanuela Lupacchino) (1997–2020)
- Endless Gallery (pin-up) (1995)
- Fanboy #3 (1999)
- Flinch #2 (1999)
- Gemini Blood #7 (inker, over Tommy Lee Edwards) (1997)
- Green Arrow vol. 2 #109 (inker, over Jim Aparo) (1996)
- Green Arrow vol. 5 #25 (inker, over Denys Cowan) (2014)
- Green Arrow/Black Canary #22–29 (inker, over Mike Norton) (2009–2010)
- Green Lantern: The Last Will and Testament of Hal Jordan graphic novel (inker, over Brent Anderson) (2002)
- Heroes Against Hunger (back cover) (1986)
- Joker's Asylum: Mad Hatter (inker, over Keith Giffen) (2010)
- JSA 80-Page Giant 2010 #1 (inker, over Mike Norton) (2010)
- Nightwing/Huntress #1–4 (inker, over Greg Land) (1998)
- The Question #37 (inker, over Denys Cowan) (2010)
- The Question: The Deaths of Vic Sage #1-4 (inker, over Denys Cowan) (2020)
- Red Circle: The Hangman #1 (inker, over Tom Derenick) (2009)
- Red Circle: The Shield #1 (inker, over Tom Derenick) (2009)
- Reign in Hell #1–8 (inker, over Tom Derenick) (2008–2009)
- Rogues Gallery #1 (pin-up) (1996)
- Sandman: Endless Nights GN (2003)
- Secret Origins vol. 3 #4 (inker, over Denys Cowan) (2014)
- The Shadow vol. 3 #1–6 (1987–1988)
- Speed Force #1 (inker, over Jim Aparo) (1997)
- The Spirit vol. 2 #1 (2010)
- Starman #81 (inker, over Fernando Dagnino) (2010)
- Steel #48 (inker, over Denys Cowan) (1998)
- Superman #400 (pin-up) (1984)
- Superman vol. 2 #173 (2002)
- Superman: Day of Doom #1–4 (inker, over Dan Jurgens) (2003)
- Stormwatch #11 (inker, over C. P. Smith) (2003)
- Transmetropolitan: Filth of the City (2001)
- Vertigo Quarterly CMYK #3 (2014)
- Web #1–10 (inker, over Tom Derenick) (2009–2010)
- World's Finest: Our Worlds at War #1 (2001)

==== Marvel Comics ====
- Alias #7 (two pages), 8 (three pages) (2001)
- The Avengers Annual #16 (inker, over John Romita Jr.) (1987)
- Bizarre Adventures #31 (1982)
- Black Widow vol. 3 #1–6 (2004–2005)
- Black Widow: The Things They Say About Her... #1–6 (2005–2006)
- Blade: Vampire Hunter #3 (inker, over Bart Sears) (2000)
- Captain America: Red, White & Blue (one story only) (2002)
- Daredevil: End of Days #1–8 (inker, over Klaus Janson) (2012–2013)
- Daredevil: Love and War GN (1986)
- Elektra: Assassin #1–8 (1986–1987)
- Epic Illustrated #34 ("Slow Dancer") (1986)
- Excalibur #27 (inker, over Barry Windsor-Smith) (1990)
- Fantastic Four #219, 222–231 (1980–1981)
- Galactus The Devourer #1–6 (inker, over Jon J Muth and John Buscema) (1999–2000)
- Gambit #3–4 (inker, over Klaus Janson) (1997)
- Generation X Annual '95 #1 (inker, over multiple artists) (1995)
- Heroes for Hope starring the X-Men #1 (inker, over Frank Miller) (1985)
- The Hulk! #13–15, 17–18, 20 (Moon Knight backup stories) (1979–1980)
- Marvel Fanfare #38 (inker, over Judith Hunt), 42 (inker, over Bob Hall) (1988–1989)
- Marvel Preview #18, 21 (1979–1980)
- Marvel Saga #8 (1986)
- Marvel Super Special #36 (comics adaptation of Dune (1985))
- Moon Knight #1, 3, 9–15, 22–26, 28–30 (penciller and inker); 2, 4–8, 17–20 (penciller only); 33 (inker, over Kevin Nowlan); 200 (penciller and inker) (1980–1983 and 2016)
- The New Mutants #18–31 (penciller and inker); 35–37 (inker, over Mary Wilshire); 38 (inker, over Rick Leonardi) (1984–1986)
- New X-Men #127, 131 (inker, over John Paul Leon) (2002)
- Return of the Jedi #1–4 first page and pinups (1983)
- The Spectacular Spider-Man #220–229 (inker, over Sal Buscema) (1995)
- Spider-Girl #0 (inker, over Ron Frenz) (2006)
- Spider-Man 2099 #40, 42 (inker, over Andrew Wildman) (1996)
- Stray Toasters #1–4 (1989)
- The Tomb of Dracula #6 (1980)
- Ultimate Marvel Team-Up #6–8 (2001)
- The Uncanny X-Men #159 (penciller); 288 (inker, over Andy Kubert), 314 (inker, over Lee Weeks), Annual #6 (1982–1994)
- Wolverine: Inner Fury #1 (1993)
- Wolverine vol. 2 #10–16 (inker, over John Buscema), 123–124 (inker, over Denys Cowan) (1989–1998)
- X-Man #9 (inker, over Lee Weeks) (1995)
- X-Men Unlimited #43 (2003)

=== Cover work ===
==== DC Comics ====
- All-Flash #1 (variant cover)
- Batman #596
- Batman & The Joker: The Deadly Duo #6 (variant cover)
- Batman/Catwoman Special (variant cover)
- Batman/Scarface: A Psychodrama
- Batman: Cacophony #1 (variant cover)
- Batman: City of Madness #3 (variant cover)
- Batman: Gotham by Gaslight: A League for Justice #1 (variant cover)
- Batman: Kings of Fear #1 (variant cover)
- Batman: Legends of the Dark Knight #123
- Batman: One Dark Knight #3 (variant cover)
- Batman: Reptilian #1 (variant cover)
- Batman: Shadow of the Bat #91
- Batman: The Return of Bruce Wayne #6 (variant cover)
- Batman: The Widening Gyre #1-6
- Blackest Night: Batman #1-3 (variant cover)
- Detective Comics #741, 772–773, 775
- Elvira's House of Mystery #7
- JLA #59
- Legion of Super-Heroes vol. 3 #38
- The Question #1–19 #21–23, Annual #1
- The Riddler: Year One #1-6
- Star Trek: The Next Generation #1–6
- Star Trek: The Next Generation graphic novel collecting six issue mini series with variant cover
- Teen Titans Spotlight #10

==== Marvel Comics ====
- ALF Annual #2
- Amazing High Adventure #1
- Beauty and the Beast #1–4
- Black Panther #14
- The Brotherhood #1–3
- Clive Barker's Hellraiser #10
- Comet Man #1–6
- Daredevil #197, 204, 207, 236, 338
- The Dark Phoenix Saga trade paperback
- Dazzler #8–9, 15–16, 18, 27–35, 42
- The Defenders #123
- Doom 2099 #35
- Elektra vol 2. #23–27
- Elektra: The Hand #1–5
- Excalibur #83
- The Further Adventures of Indiana Jones #26
- Fury #1–6
- Ghost Rider #58
- The Incredible Hulk #295–297, 301, 312
- The Iron Manual trade paperback
- King Conan #11
- Kull the Conqueror #2
- Marc Spector: Moon Knight #26–31, 34
- Marvel Graphic Novel #8 ("Super Boxers"); #12 ("Dazzler: The Movie")
- The Marvel Masterpieces Collection 2 #3
- Marvel Spotlight vol. 2 #6
- Maximum Carnage trade paperback cover
- The New Defenders #125, 131, 135
- The New Mutants #18–31, 37, 39
- Nick Fury vs. S.H.I.E.L.D. #2
- The Official Marvel Index To The X-Men vol. 2 #3
- The Power of Iron Man trade paperback
- The Punisher vol. 2 #93
- The Punisher Holiday Special #2
- Rom #46–47, 52–54, 68, 71, Annual 2–3
- Savage Sword of Conan #102, 116
- Spider-Girl Annual '99
- Spider-Woman #16
- Starriors #1–4
- Star Wars #92, 101
- Thor #332–333
- Thor vol. 2 #75
- The Transformers #1
- The Uncanny X-Men #195, 252
- What If...? #43–47
- Wonder Man #1
- X-Calibre #3
- X-Men: God Loves, Man Kills Only the 1994 trade paperback edition
- X-Men Unlimited #3

=== Other publishers ===
- 30 Days of Night: Beyond Barrow (three-issue mini-series, covers and full interior art)
- The Amazing Adventures of the Escapist #2, by Dark Horse Comics
- Big Numbers #1–2 (Covers and full interior art and several pages of #3 which was unpublished and the series discontinued)
- Bitter Root #2 – by Image Comics (B cover only)
- Brought to Light graphic novel (cover and interior art)
- Cerebus the Aardvark: Cerebus Jam #1 (cover only)
- Classics Illustrated #4 – Moby-Dick (Berkley Publishing)
- John Wick #1 (cover only)
- Judge Dredd #12–22 – Titan Books collected edition (covers only)
- Judge Dredd and the Angel Gang – Collected edition graphic novel (cover only)
- Judge Dredd: City of the Damned – Collected edition graphic novel (cover only)
- Judge Dredd: Innocents Abroad – Collected edition graphic novel (cover only — this is a cropped version of the cover of the Titan books Judge Dredd #14)
- Judge Dredd: Oz Books One to Three – Titan Books collected edition (covers only — all three covers interlink to form larger image)
- Judge Dredd: The Complete Oz – Collected edition graphic novel (cover only — the cover features a mix of covers #2 & 3 from the single reprint books)
- "Leaf" #2 by NAB (cover only)
- Lone Wolf and Cub #14–20 – US reprint books by First Publishing (covers only)
- M3 #2, Hound Comics (cover only)
- Oni Double Feature #4–5 ("A River in Egypt" part one and two)
- The Nightmare Factory — Volume 2 graphic novel, Fox Atomic Comics
- The Shadow/Batman #1 (cover only)
- Shaft #1–6 (covers only)
- Total Eclipse #1–5 (covers only)
- The Matrix graphic novel (Interior art on story section)
- Twelve Devils Dancing TPB, Action Lab Danger Zone (cover only)
- Vampirella Quarterly Spring 2007 (cover only)
- Wonder Woman '77 Meets Bionic Woman #4 (cover only)

=== Other work ===
- 1990 — Bill Sienkiewicz Sketchbook (Fantagraphics)
- 1995 — Voodoo Child: The Illustrated Legend of Jimi Hendrix (illustrated storybook with CD, cover and full interior art)
- 1998 — Santa, My Life & Times (illustrated storybook, cover and full interior art)
- 2003 — Bill Sienkiewicz: Precursor (Art Book, Hermes Press)
- Vampire: The Masquerade Revised Guide to Camarilla & Sabbat covers

==== Media ====
- The Venture Bros. Seasons 1 and 3, Warner Home Video
- Bruce Cockburn's album The Charity of Night
- RZA's album Bobby Digital in Stereo
- EPMD's album Business as Usual
- Entertainment Weekly, various covers
- Spin, various covers
- Resident Evil, cover artwork for the American and European release of the PlayStation version
- Roger Waters' album, Leaving Beirut
- Sold Out: A Threevening with Kevin Smith
- Kid Cudi's album, Man on the Moon: The End of Day

==== Trading cards ====
- VS System, various sets
- Big Budget Circus (Eclipse Enterprises)
- Friendly Dictators (Eclipse Enterprises)
- Coup D'Etat (Eclipse Enterprises)
- Rock Bottom Awards (Eclipse Enterprises)
- Marvel Masterpieces, Series 2 and Series 3, assorted cards
- 1994 Fleer Ultra X-Men, assorted cards

Preceded by John Byrne	Fantastic Four artist 1980–1981	Succeeded by John Byrne
Preceded by n/a	Moon Knight artist 1980–1983	Succeeded by Kevin Nowlan
Preceded by Sal Buscema	New Mutants artist 1984–1985	Succeeded by Steve Leialoha
Preceded by Howard Chaykin	The Shadow artist 1987–1988	Succeeded by Kyle Baker
Preceded by Scott Hanna	The Spectacular Spider-Man inker 1995	Succeeded by Al Milgrom
