= Stray Toasters =

1988 Marvel Comics miniseries

- The front and back covers of Bill Sienkiewicz' Stray Toasters model three (number 3). This shows the diversity of Sienkiewicz' work: the front cover is a fine-art oil painting portrait of one of the novel's characters, the back shows his more anarchic comicbook style.

Publication information
- Publisher: Epic Comics
- Format: Miniseries
- Publication date: 1988
- No. of issues: 4

Creative team
- Created by: Bill Sienkiewicz
- Written by: Bill Sienkiewicz
- Artist(s): Bill Sienkiewicz

Stray Toasters is a four-issue comic book miniseries created, written and illustrated by Bill Sienkiewicz and published by Marvel Comics's imprint Epic Comics in 1988. Although it was critically acclaimed, it never reached widespread circulation like Sienkiewicz's later works.

The story revolves around criminal psychologist Egon Rustemagik and his investigation of a serial killer who seems to be targeting women.

== Characters ==
- Phil - the Devil, whose narrative is indicated by red boxes and postcards to his family: wife Emily, sons Timmy and Brad.
- Todd - a boy, possibly autistic.
- Deborah Dissler - the first victim, she called Todd her son.
- Abigail "Abby" Nolan - a psychiatric counselor.
- Dr. Egon Rustemagik - a criminal psychologist.
- Mona
- Harvard Chalky - Assistant District Attorney.
- Dr. Montana Violet - a crazed cyanotic scientist who is slowly degenerating, is fed by birds, is mechanically bound to a "throne", and tends to use quotations.
- Dahlia
