= Dan Burr =

American comic book

- Born: Danny E. Burr; November 14, 1951 (age 75)
- Area: Artist
- Notable works: Kings in Disguise; Economix; On the Ropes
- Collaborators: James Vance; Michael Goodwin
- Awards: Eisner Award, 1988; Harvey Award, 1989

Dan E. Burr (born November 14, 1951) is an American comic book artist best known for his collaborations with writer James Vance on Kings in Disguise and On the Ropes, both set during the Great Depression. He is known for the meticulous research that goes into his artwork.

Burr started out in commercial illustration before turning to comics in the mid-1980s. Most of Burr's early work in the field was done for small press publishers like Kitchen Sink Press, Eclipse Comics, and Dark Horse Comics.

In 1988, Burr and writer James Vance created the six-issue limited series Kings in Disguise for Kitchen Sink. The series was a multiple Harvey and Eisner awards winner, and is now considered one of the hundred best comic book stories of all time. It has been hailed by Alan Moore, Will Eisner, Harvey Kurtzman, and Art Spiegelman.

In addition to Kings in Disguise, Burr worked on Death Rattle, Grateful Dead Comix, the Crow series, and various trading cards for Kitchen Sink.

In the 1990s, Burr worked for publishers like Paradox Press (on The Big Book Of series) and Mojo Press.

In 2012, Burr collaborated with writer Michael Goodwin on Economix: How our Economy Works (And Doesn't Work) In Words and Pictures, published by Abrams Books. Economix was a New York Times bestseller, and received praise from, among others, Wired, Publishers Weekly, and Mother Jones.

In 2013, 24 years after Kings in Disguise, W. W. Norton released its sequel, On the Ropes, also done by the team of Vance and Burr. On the Ropes was positively reviewed by, among others, the Los Angeles Times, Publishers Weekly, and writer Alan Moore.

In addition to his work in comics, Burr also does editorial illustration, caricatures, portraiture, and art for children's books. (He is not to be confused with American children's book illustrator Dan Burr, born in 1960.)

Burr lives in Milwaukee, Wisconsin, with his wife and art partner Debbie Freiberg.

== Awards ==
- 1988 Eisner Award Best Single Issue/Story — Kings in Disguise #1
- 1988 Eisner Award Best New Series
- 1989 Harvey Award Best New Series

== Bibliography ==
- Kings in Disguise (Kitchen Sink Press, 1990; reissued by W. W. Norton, 2006) — with writer James Vance
- Economix: How our Economy Works (And Doesn't Work) In Words and Pictures (Abrams Books, 2012) — with writer Michael Goodwin
- On the Ropes (W. W. Norton, 2013) — with writer James Vance
- Presidential Misadventures: Poems That Poke Fun at the Man in Charge (Roaring Brook Press, 2015) — with writer Bob Raczka.
